= Kill Me Baby =

Japanese manga and anime series

- Cover of the first manga volume, featuring Sonya carrying Yasuna Oribe

キルミーベイベー (Kiru Mī Beibē)
- Genre: Comedy, slice of life
- Manga
- Written by: Kaduho
- Published by: Houbunsha
- Magazine: Manga Time Kirara Carat
- Original run: July 2008 – present
- Volumes: 16
- Anime television series
- Directed by: Yoshiki Yamakawa
- Written by: Hideki Shirane
- Music by: EXPO
- Studio: J.C.Staff
- Licensed by: NA: Sentai Filmworks; UK: MVM Films
- Original network: TBS
- English network: SEA: Animax Asia
- Original run: January 5, 2012 – March 29, 2012
- Episodes: 13
- Original video animation
- Directed by: Yoshiki Yamakawa
- Written by: Hideki Shirane
- Music by: EXPO
- Studio: J.C.Staff
- Released: October 16, 2013
- Runtime: 30 minutes
- icon

Kill Me Baby (キルミーベイベー, Kiru Mī Beibē) is a Japanese four-panel gag comedy manga series written and illustrated by Kaduho which began serialization in Houbunsha's Manga Time Kirara Carat from July 2008. It follows the school lives of a high school girl Yasuna Oribe and her friends Sonya, an assassin, and Agiri Goshiki, a ninja. An anime television series adaptation animated by J.C.Staff aired in Japan between January 5 and March 29, 2012, with an OVA episode released on October 16, 2013.

== Characters ==
Yasuna Oribe (折部 やすな, Oribe Yasuna)
Voiced by: Chinatsu Akasaki (Japanese); Hilary Haag (English)
A normal high school girl and self proclaimed friend of Sonya, who is often friendly to Sonya despite how dangerous she is. She tends to take on the brunt of Sonya's attacks whenever she takes her by surprise or goes overboard with her pranks. She is quite simple minded and is not afraid of Sonya at all, despite the fact that she is an assassin.
Sonya (ソーニャ, Sōnya)
Voiced by: Mutsumi Tamura (Japanese); Luci Christian (English)
A foreign trained assassin with blonde twintails attending a regular high school. As she constantly takes on assassin work she is constantly alert and often attacks Yasuna to punishment. She takes her by surprise or tries to play jokes on her. Despite her tough composure, she is scared of various things such as cockroaches, ghosts, and dogs (even domestic dogs). She has also been shown to care a little for Yasuna.
Agiri Goshiki (呉織 あぎり, Goshiki Agiri)
Voiced by: Ai Takabe (anime), Minami Shinoda (Kirara Fantasia) (Japanese); Rozie Curtis (English)
A laid back ninja from the same organization as Sonya. She transferred to Sonya's school for some assignments and stays at a former ninja club room without permission. She often perplexes Sonya and Yasuna with dubious 'ninjutsus'. She is shown to be calm and have long purplish hair.
Unused Character (没キャラ, Botsu-kyara)
Voiced by: Rie Kugimiya (Japanese); Brittney Karbowski (English)
A redheaded, green-eyed, nameless character who was supposed to be part of the main cast, but was dropped as Yasuna had supposedly taken on all her personality traits. She has since vowed revenge against Yasuna and Sonya.

== Media ==
=== Manga ===
Kill Me Baby began its serialization in the July 2008 issue of Manga Time Kirara Carat manga magazine after a prototype of the strip was published in an earlier issue of the magazine. Houbunsha published the first compilation volume on January 27, 2009, with sixteenth volumes published.

=== Anime ===
An anime adaptation by J.C.Staff aired on TBS between January 5, 2012, and March 29, 2012. The opening theme is "Kill Me no Baby!" (キルミーのベイベー！, Kiru Mī no Beibē) by Mutsumi Tamura and Chinatsu Akasaki while the ending theme is "Futari no Kimochi no Honto no Himitsu" (ふたりのきもちのほんとのひみつ, The True Secrets of the Pair's Feelings) by Tamura and Akasaki. These theme songs and all of background music are composed by EXPO, a synthpop group consisting Kimitaka Matsumae and Suguru Yamaguchi. The series has been licensed in North America by Sentai Filmworks. A CD Album, Kill Me Baby Super, was released on October 16, 2013, and includes an original video animation.

==== Episode list ====
No.	Title	Original release date
1	"Sneaking Dog, Blossoming Cherry"; Transliteration: "Inu o Shinobi te Sakura Saku" (Japanese: いぬをしのびてさくらさく)	January 5, 2012
Yasuna Oribe gets a lot of injuries from classmate and hired assassin, Sonya. When a dog wanders into the classroom, the two think of a way to get rid of it. Later, Yasuna meets a self-proclaimed ninja named Agiri Goshiki who tries to sell her some 'ninjitsus'.
2	"Nunchaku Skills Bear Balloons"; Transliteration: "Waza Nunchaku de Kuma Fuusen" (Japanese: わざぬんちゃくでくまふうせん)	January 12, 2012
Yasuna tries and fails to learn to use nunchuks before she and Sonya encounter an escaped bear. The next day, a little girl gets Sonya and Yasuna to play with her.
3	"Cursed Psychic Rain Wrestling"; Transliteration: "Esupa Noroeba Ame Sumō" (Japanese: えすぱのろえばあめすもう)	January 19, 2012
Yasuna tries her hand at psychic powers and voodoo curses, before finding some activities to do on a rainy day. Later, a red haired girl who was rejected from the main cast tries to take revenge on Yasuna and Sonya, but keeps missing them.
4	"Ice Cream Scream Watermelon"; Transliteration: "Aisuru Suika Yoga Shikaku" (Japanese: あいするすいかよがしかく)	January 26, 2012
On a hot summer's day, Yasuna and Sonya buy some ice cream, where Yasuna becomes obsessed with finding a winning stick. The next day, they head to the beach to try and break open a watermelon. Later, Sonya is targeted by another assassin, who is eventually stopped by Agiri. On another day, more assassins disguised as Yasuna target Sonya, which becomes more confusing when the real Yasuna shows up and plays along.
5	"Buggy Festival Sea Dolls"; Transliteration: "Mushi o Matsuri te Umi Ningyō" (Japanese: むしをまつりてうみにんぎょう)	February 2, 2012
Yasuna's attempt to get Sonya interested in bug catching goes awry when she attracts a lot of bees. Later, Yasuna and Sonya go to a festival and try out all the stalls. While at the beach, Yasuna and Sonya deal with a loose dog and get stranded at sea. Later, Yasuna practises a puppet routine, which just annoys Sonya.
6	"Navel Mechanism Paper Toll Ice"; Transliteration: "Heso Karakuri de Teru Gōri" (Japanese: へそからくりでてるごおり)	February 9, 2012
As summer ends, Yasuna gets a craving for shaved ice and asks Agiri for help. Later, Yasuna and Sonya go to Agiri's house, filled with hidden mechanisms, before later having to deal with a stormy day.
7	"Culture Beanbag Jousting Duel"; Transliteration: "Bunka Otedama de Kibasen" (Japanese: ぶんかおてだまできばせん)	February 16, 2012
As Yasuna tries to come up with a project for the upcoming culture festival, Sonya demonstrates how long she is able to hold her breath. At a sports festival, the girls debate who should be on top in a tower battle. Later, Yasuna becomes irritated when Sonya trumps her at juggling. Afterwards, both Yasuna and Sonya become engaged in a battle against a mosquito.
8	"Sticking, Strumming, Stabbing"; Transliteration: "Hamari Kanaderi Tsukisasari" (Japanese: はまりかなでりつきささり)	February 23, 2012
While trying to play a prank on Sonya, Yasuna gets a bin stuck on her head. Later, Yasuna has Sonya try out various musical instruments before roping her into a game of darts.
9	"Fishing Hammer's Spawn Branch Forgotten"; Transliteration: "Tsuri Tsuchinoko shi Wasure Eda" (Japanese: つりつちのこしわすれえだ)	March 1, 2012
When both Yasuna and Sonya end up misplacing some things, they help each other search them. While searching for the legendary tsuchinoko, Yasuna and Sonya end up encountering an enemy assassin, Yasuna competes with Sonya to see who can catch the most fish, Yasuna luckily gets saved by a flower vase and decides to test her luck.
10	"Santa Icicle Snow Mantra"; Transliteration: "Santa Tsurara te Yukidarumu" (Japanese: さんたつららてゆきだるむ)	March 8, 2012
As snow falls on the schoolyard, Yasuna enjoys the snow, unlike Sonya. The next day, Yasuna catches a cold but goes to school anyway, much to Sonya's annoyance. Later, Yasuna pretends to be a remote controlled toy before having a paper airplane contest with Sonya. A week before Christmas, the girls have a Christmas party where Agiri tries to incorporate Halloween.
11	"Bath Kite Rice Cake New Year's First Dream"; Transliteration: "Furo Tako Mochi te Hatsuyume shi" (Japanese: ふろたこもちてはつゆめし)	March 15, 2012
As Yasuna has various New Year's dreams, she attempts to get Sonya interested in making mochi. After attempting to fly some kites, Yasuna and Sonya go to a public bath together. Yasuna was punch in the face in a Boxing Match.
12	"Drowsy Chocolate Injury Compress"; Transliteration: "Choko ga Nemuke te Kega Shippu" (Japanese: ちょこがねむけて けがしっぷ)	March 22, 2012
Yasuna becomes interested in bandages and decides to stick some on herself, believing she'll be protected from future wounds. Later, Sonya tries to catch up on some rest after so much work, but Yasuna misreads the situation and keeps getting in her way. Later on, Yasuna tries to convince Sonya to give up being an assassin.
13	"Make the Kill Me and Make Me Your Baby"; Transliteration: "Kiru ga Mī shite Beibe suru" (Japanese: きるがみーしてべいべする)	March 29, 2012
Yasuna and Sonya get in a fix when Yasuna brings in some handcuffs. Not knowing when Sonya's birthday is, Yasuna and Agiri hold a party for her anyway. Later, Yasuna tries to stop Sonya, believing she is meeting up with a target, and winds up in a pit. Sonya stops after Yasuna admits that she gets worried about Sonya when she is on assignments.
OVA	"Buddha Statues, Injuries and Fake Halloween"; Transliteration: "Butsuzō Kegatte Nise Harowīn" (Japanese: ぶつぞうけがってにせはろうぃーん)	October 16, 2013
Yasuna allegedly breaks an alarm clock and tries to hide it from Sonya when she believes it to be hers. Later, Yasuna attempts to break some concrete tiles she brought instead of her lunch. Afterwards, Yasuna and Sonya are asked by Agiri to clean up her storage shed, before later encountering a fake Agiri themselves.

=== Video game ===
Characters from the series appear alongside other Manga Time Kirara characters in the 2017 mobile RPG, Kirara Fantasia.

== Reception ==
Theron Martin of Anime News Network found some of the humor repetitious and the mediocre animation as the series' faults but said that it was balanced out with material that did garner laughs and a workmanlike dub, calling it "a series probably best-enjoyed one or two episodes at a time; trying to marathon it can be a brain-melting experience and is so not recommended. Keep it to smaller doses, though, and it delivers often enough to make a reliable comedy diversion." Aiden Foote, writing for THEM Anime Reviews, also found the animation middling but praised the slapstick humor and its delivery by both Yasuna and Sonya, concluding that "Overall, almost from nothing, Kill Me Baby! seems to have itself a sweet little niche in the congested four-panel market. What it lacks in a large cast, it makes up for by diligently bringing the characters it does use to life."

== Music in the anime ==
1. (Opening Theme) "Kill Me no Baby! (キルミーのベイベー!)" by Yasuna and Sonya (Chinatsu Akasaki & Mutsumi Tamura)
2. (Ending Theme) "Futari no Kimochi no Honto no Himitsu (ふたりのきもちのほんとのひみつ)" by Yasuna and Sonya (Chinatsu Akasaki & Mutsumi Tamura)
3. Kill Me Baby Character Song Agiri Akichi to Noraneko
4. Kill Me Baby Character Song Yasuna Kyou Mo Futari De
5. Kill Me Baby Character Song Sonya Yakisoba Pan
6. Kaerimichi - EXPO (Kill Me Baby)
