= Gokigenyō, Ikkyoku Ika ga? =

Japanese manga series

- First tankōbon volume cover

ごきげんよう、一局いかが?
- Genre: Sports (mahjong)
- Manga
- Written by: Tsukasa Unohana
- Published by: Houbunsha
- Imprint: Manga Time KR Comics
- Magazine: Manga Time Kirara Carat
- Original run: June 28, 2022 – present
- Volumes: 5
- Anime television series
- Directed by: Kaori
- Written by: Kazuyuki Fudeyasu
- Studio: Felix Film

Gokigenyō, Ikkyoku Ika ga? (Japanese: ごきげんよう、一局いかが?; lit. 'Good Day to You, How About a Game?') is a Japanese four-panel manga series written and illustrated by Tsukasa Unohana. It began serialization in Houbunsha's Manga Time Kirara Carat magazine in June 2022, and has been compiled into five volumes as of June 2026. An anime television series adaptation produced by Felix Film has been announced.

== Plot ==
Sae Kitaoji, a student at the all-girls Ōtori Academy, feels out of place in school, having been unable to make friends due to missing her first week of school due to illness. She spends her days playing a mahjong game on her phone, but is embarrassed about others finding about her hobby. One day, Chise Kannami, the most popular girl in class, discovers her playing mahjong and becomes curious about her. Quickly becoming interested in mahjong, Chise decides to take up the hobby herself, befriending Sae in the process.

== Characters ==
Sae Kitaoji (北王子 冴, Kitaōji Sae)
A first-year student at Ōtori Academy, who regularly plays a mahjong game on her phone. Because of a bout of influenza during her first week of school, she was unable to make friends until Chise befriends her. She was recently introduced to mahjong by her brother, and she still lacks experience in it. She keeps her hobby secret from others as she feels that mahjong does not meet the expectations of students at a prestigious all-girls school.
Chise Kannami (神南 千星, Kannami Chise)
The most popular girl in class, who befriends Sae after seeing her play mahjong on her phone. She quickly becomes interested in mahjong and starts meeting with Sae every day.
Nonoha Saionji (西園寺 乃々花, Saionji Nonoha)
Sae and Chise's classmate, who became interested in their relationship. She joins their mahjong group after observing the two. She is very dedicated to her interests, even making her in-game avatar detailed.
Sumire Shoji (東海林 純礼, Shōji Sumire)
Nonoha's childhood friend, who became jealous of Sae and Chise after they become close to Nonoha. After challenging the two to a game of mahjong, she joins their group as well. Unlike the others, she had some experience playing mahjong due to her family.

== Development ==
The idea for the series came to Tsukasa Unohana when she noticed that, while there were several manga about mahjong, most of them were not beginner-friendly, leading her to want to create a series that would be accessible to newcomers. The characters getting to know the game was influenced by the desire to allow readers to follow along their journey in learning how to play. She wanted to write a story set in an all-girls school, but felt that focusing too much on that aspect would lead to less focus on the mahjong aspect, so she wanted to balance the two.

== Media ==
=== Manga ===
The series is written and illustrated by Tsukasa Unohana, who previously serialized the manga series Anima Yell! in Houbunsha's Manga Time Kirara Carat magazine. It began serialization in Manga Time Kirara Carat on June 28, 2022. The first tankōbon volume was released on April 27, 2023; five volumes have been released as of June 26, 2026.

| No. | Release date | ISBN |
|---|---|---|
| 1 | April 27, 2023 | 978-4-8322-7458-7 |
| 2 | February 27, 2024 | 978-4-8322-9527-8 |
| 3 | November 27, 2024 | 978-4-8322-9588-9 |
| 4 | September 27, 2025 | 978-4-8322-9666-4 |
| 5 | June 26, 2026 | 978-4-8322-9729-6 |

=== Anime ===
An anime television series adaptation was announced on June 26, 2026. The series will be produced by Felix Film and directed by Kaori, with Kazuyuki Fudeyasu handling series composition and Mai Ōtsuka designing the characters.

== See also ==
- Anima Yell!, another manga series by the same author
- Pon no Michi, an original anime series with a manga adaptation by the same author
