= Natsumi Kawaida =

Japanese voice actress (born 1996)

- 川井田 夏海
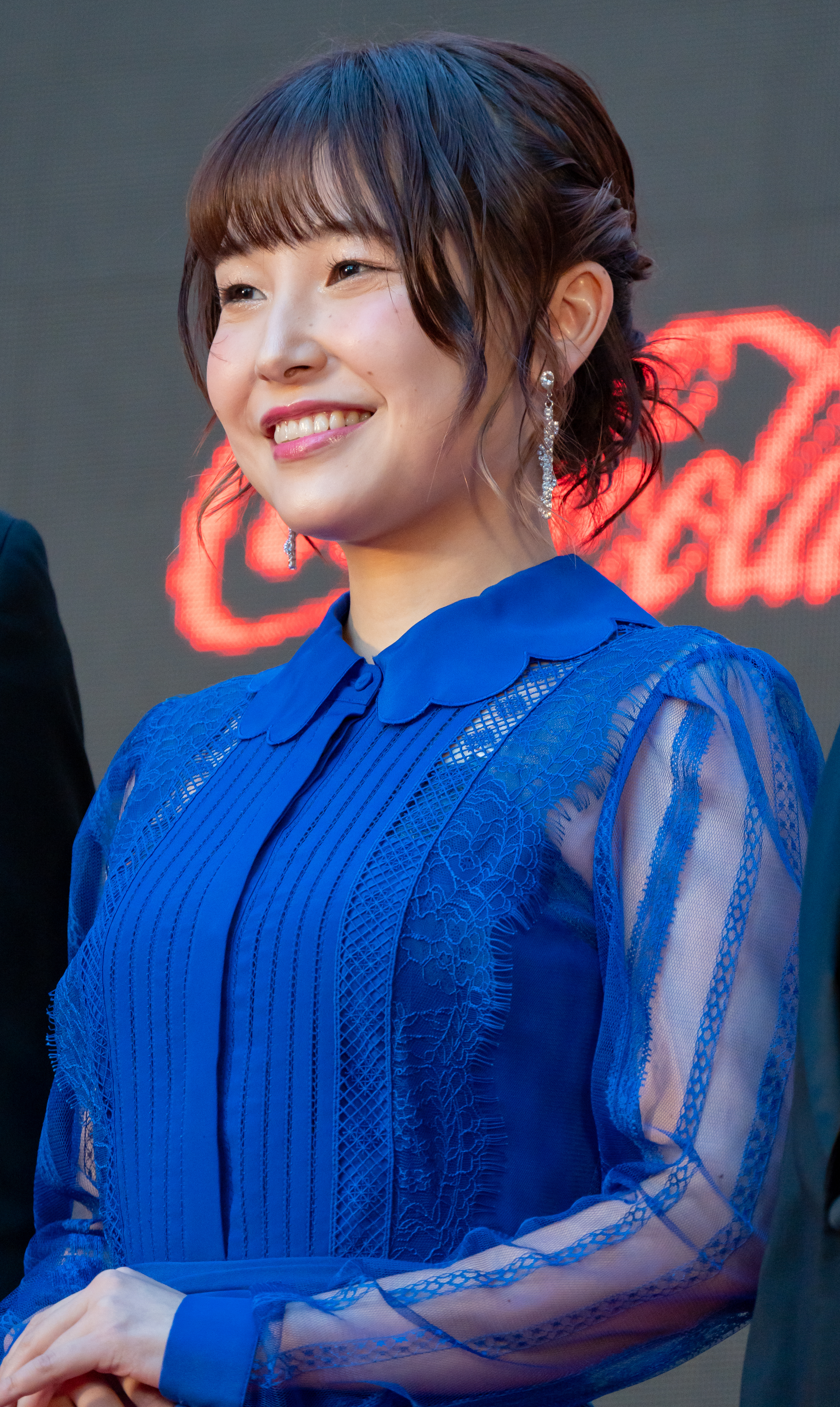
- Kawaida at the 36th Tokyo International Film Festival in October 2023
- Born: February 18, 1996 (age 30); Aichi Prefecture, Japan
- Occupation: Voice actress
- Years active: 2017–present
- Agent: Intention
- Notable work: Diary of Our Days at the Breakwater as Natsumi Hodaka; Higehiro as Asami Yūki; Mao as Nanoka Kiba; Though I Am an Inept Villainess as Shu Keigetsu

Natsumi Kawaida (川井田 夏海, Kawaida Natsumi; born February 18, 1996) is a Japanese voice actress who is affiliated with Intention. She began her voice acting activities in 2017, and in 2020 she played her first main role as Natsumi Hodaka in the anime television series Diary of Our Days at the Breakwater. She is also known for her role as Asami Yūki in Higehiro, Nanoka Kiba in Mao, Akine Atagawa in The Ramparts of Ice and Shu Keigetsu in Though I Am an Inept Villainess.

== Career ==
Kawaida was born in Aichi Prefecture on February 18, 1996. In 2009, she participated in a production of the musical Annie sponsored by Marumiya Corporation. In 2014, she participated in a voice acting audition sponsored by the International Voice Actor Development Association, where she received an Excellence Award. After attending a workshop held by the voice acting agency Intention, she made her voice acting debut in the anime television series Kirakira Pretty Cure a la Mode in 2017, and later became affiliated with Intention. In 2020, she voiced Natsumi Hodaka in the anime television series Diary of Our Days at the Breakwater, also performing the series' opening and ending themes together with her fellow cast members. In 2021, she voiced Asami Yūki in Higehiro. In 2022, she voiced Rufuria in RPG Real Estate, and Dokudami in In the Heart of Kunoichi Tsubaki.

== Filmography ==
=== Anime ===
| Year | Title | Role |
|---|---|---|
| 2017 | Kirakira Pretty Cure a la Mode | Female student (episode 12) |
| 2017 | Infini-T Force | Girl (episode 12) |
| 2018 | Hug! Pretty Cure | Mogumogu |
| 2018 | Persona 5: The Animation | Female announcer (episode 12) |
| 2018 | Cells at Work! | Immature thymus cell 4 (episode 9) |
| 2019 | The Magnificent Kotobuki | Cindi |
| 2019 | Wasteful Days of High School Girls | Uzumaki (episodes 1, 5) |
| 2019 | Ahiru no Sora | Sachi Funakoshi |
| 2019 | Granblue Fantasy: The Animation | Maid (episode 3) |
| 2020 | The Case Files of Jeweler Richard | Boy (episode 1) |
| 2020 | If My Favorite Pop Idol Made It to the Budokan, I Would Die | Stylish girl (episode 2) |
| 2020 | Asteroid in Love | JAXA guide (episode 4), Student (episode 7) |
| 2020 | Diary of Our Days at the Breakwater | Natsumi Hodaka |
| 2020 | Gleipnir | Female student |
| 2020 | Love Live! Nijigasaki High School Idol Club | Asaki |
| 2021 | Fena: Pirate Princess | Yukimaru Sanada (young) |
| 2021 | Jujutsu Kaisen | Noritoshi Kamo (young) |
| 2021 | Hori-san to Miyamura-kun | Schoolgirl (episode 6) |
| 2021 | Laid-Back Camp | Hiroto Ichinomiya (episode 8) |
| 2021 | Higehiro | Asami Yūki |
| 2021 | Mars Red | You (episodes 8–11) |
| 2022 | RPG Real Estate | Rufuria |
| 2022 | In the Heart of Kunoichi Tsubaki | Dokudami |
| 2022 | JoJo's Bizarre Adventure: Stone Ocean | The Seven Young Goats |
| 2023 | Mobile Suit Gundam: The Witch from Mercury | Seethia |
| 2023 | Frieren | young Sein |
| 2024 | The Demon Prince of Momochi House | Himari Momochi |
| 2025 | I Left My A-Rank Party to Help My Former Students Reach the Dungeon Depths! | Silk, Selfie-chan |
| 2026 | The Ramparts of Ice | Akine Atagawa |
| 2026 | Mao | Nanoka Kiba |
| 2026 | Sparks of Tomorrow | Kate Okura |
| 2026 | Though I Am an Inept Villainess | Shu Keigetsu |
| 2026 | Thunder 3 | Tsubame |

=== Anime films ===
| Year | Title | Role |
|---|---|---|
| 2023 | The Concierge at Hokkyoku Department Store | Akino |

=== Dubbing ===
==== Live-action ====
- All of Us Are Dead, Park Hee-su (Lee Chae-eun)
- Are You There God? It's Me, Margaret., Nancy Wheeler (Elle Graham)
- Peter Rabbit 2: The Runaway, Sara Nakamoto (Chika Yasumura)
- Shazam! (2021 THE CINEMA edition), Eugene Choi (Ian Chen), Billy (David Kohlsmith)
- Space Jam: A New Legacy, Xosha James (Harper Leigh Alexander)
- Strays, Bella (Greta Lee)
- West Side Story, Meche (Jamila Velazquez)

==== Animation ====
- The Boss Baby: Family Business, 'No' Girl
- My Little Pony: A New Generation, Izzy Moonbow
- South Park, Butters Stotch (Season 8 onwards)
