= A-Channel (disambiguation) =

A-Channel was a Canadian television system that operated in Manitoba and Alberta from 1997 to 2005.

A-Channel may also refer to:

- CTV2, known as A-Channel from 2005 to 2008, a Canadian television system
- A Channel (manga), is a Japanese four-panel comic strip by bb Kuroda

== See also ==
- A-type potassium channel; see Voltage-gated potassium channel
