= Tsuma ga Kanpeki sugiru no de, Chotto Midashite Ii desu ka? =

Japanese manga series

- First tankōbon volume cover

妻が完璧すぎるので、ちょっと乱していいですか？
- Genre: Romantic comedy
- Manga
- Written by: Ruiki Akiba
- Published by: Houbunsha
- Imprint: FUZ Comics
- Magazine: Comic Fuz
- Original run: November 11, 2021 – present
- Volumes: 7

Tsuma ga Kanpeki sugiru no de, Chotto Midashite Ii desu ka? (妻が完璧すぎるので、ちょっと乱していいですか？) is a Japanese manga series written and illustrated by Ruiki Akiba. It began serialization in Houbunsha's Comic Fuz service in November 2021, and has been compiled into seven tankōbon volumes as of October 2026.

== Publication ==
The series is written and illustrated by Ruiki Akiba. It began serialization on Houbunsha's Comic Fuz online service on November 11, 2021. The first volume was released on November 1, 2022. The series has been compiled into seven tankōbon volumes as of October 2026. Voiced comic videos have been posted on the official Comic Fuz YouTube account.

No.	Release date	ISBN
1	November 1, 2022	978-4-8322-3951-7
2	April 1, 2023	978-4-8322-3984-5
3	December 25, 2023	978-4-8322-0352-5
4	September 2, 2024	978-4-8322-0430-0
5	April 28, 2025	978-4-8322-0502-4
6	December 26, 2025	978-4-8322-0577-2
7	October 1, 2026	978-4-8322-0656-4
