= Manga Time Kirara =

Japanese manga magazine

- Cover of the June 2007 issue
- Categories: Seinen manga
- Frequency: Monthly
- Circulation: 80,000 (2019)
- First issue: Special edition of Manga Time in May 2002; December 2003 (released in November 2003)
- Company: Houbunsha
- Country: Japan
- Language: Japanese
- Website: Manga Time Kirara Web

Manga Time Kirara (まんがタイムきらら, Manga Taimu Kirara) is a Japanese magazine published by Houbunsha serializing mainly four-panel seinen manga. Issued on the 9th of each month, it was first published as a special edition of Houbunsha magazine Manga Time on May 17, 2002. The first independent issue was released on November 9, 2003. Characters from the magazine appear in crossover gacha game Kirara Fantasia.

== Manga serialized ==
=== Ongoing ===
Manga	First issue	Author
Cherry Blossom! (チェリーブロッサム！, Cherī Burossamu!)	January 2006	Shinta Sakayama
Chevalier (しゅばりえーる, Shubariēru)	January 2014	Daise
Futari de Hitorigurashi (ふたりでひとりぐらし、)	April 2015	zara
Gita × Man (ギタ×マン！)	November 2013	Ripo Day
God and the Quintet (神様とクインテット, Kami-sama to Kuintetto)	July 2014	Oshioshio
Hakoiri Drops (箱入りドロップス)	April 2011	Yū Tsurusaki
Himekami Diary (ひめかみ＊ダイアリィ)	June 2014	Mottsun*
Hoshikuzu Telepath (星屑テレパス)	June 2019	Rasuko Ookuma
Ichijyoma Mankitsu Gurashi! (一畳間まんきつ暮らし!)	January 2019	Kumako Hisama
K-On! Shuffle (けいおん！Shuffle)	July 2018	Kakifly
Koharu Biyori. (こはる日和。)	November 2014	Neko Ume
Komyushō Idol Reika-chan (コミュ障アイドルれいかちゃん)	October 2014	Mario Hanasaki
Olive! Believe, "Olive"? (オリーブ！Believe,"Olive"?)	July 2014	Furō Fuzuki
Place to Place (あっちこっち, Atchi Kotchi)	January 2006	Ishiki
Ranking Girl (ランキンガール, Rankin Gāru)	January 2014	Okamoto
Sakuranbocchi (サクランボッチ)	January 2014	Nayuta Yūri
Santa Claus Off! (サンタクロース・オフ！, Santa Kurōsu Ofu!)	February 2003	Kanari Abe
Satsuki Complex (さつきコンプレックス, Satsuki Konpurekkusu)	January 2011	Sugar
Sengen Tantei Reiko no Hanninroku (千眼探偵レイコの犯人録)	January 2015	Furai
Shimekiri Gohan (〆切ごはん)	September 2013	Aki Konishi
Slow Start (スロウスタート, Surou Sutāto)	July 2013	Yuiko Tokumi
Sparkling ★ Study ~Absolute Pass Declaration~ (神様とクインテット, Kirakira ★ Study ~Zettai Gōkaku Sengen~)	June 2015	Tsubomi Hanabana
Taishō Roman Kissatan – Rakuwen Otome S (大正ロマン喫茶譚 ラクヱンオトメS)	September 2014	Dan Kanda
Tonari de. (となりで。)	March 2015	Mizu Kisaragi
Varubaito! (ヴぁるばいと！)	January 2014	Ama
Yuyushiki (ゆゆ式, Yuyushiki)	May 2008	Komata Mikami

=== Finished ===
Manga	First Issue	Final Issue	Author
Akumasama e Rupu ☆ (悪魔様へるぷ☆)	July 2003	May 2006	Sesuna Mikabe
Ane Chikku Sensation (あねちっくセンセーション, Ane Chikku Sensēshon)	February 2005	June 2008	Yashiyo Yoshiya
Dōjin Work (ドージンワーク, Dōjin Wāku)	April 2006	October 2008	Hiroyuki
Fu-Step (ふーすてっぷ)	August 2006	May 2008	Sesuna Mikabe
Fuon Connect! (ふおんコネクト！, Fuon Konekuto!)	March 2006	April 2008	zara
High Risk Miracle (ハイリスクみらくる, Hai Risuku Mirakuru)	July 2002	October 2004	Yashiyo Yoshiya
K-On! (けいおん！, Keion!)	June 2007	September 2012	Kakifly
Sister Equation (影ムチャ姫, Kage Mucha Hime)	July 2002	May 2007	Nantoka
Kamisama no Iutōri! (かみさまのいうとおり！)	December 2003	February 2013	Aki Konishi
Karuki Sensen (カルキ戦線)	July 2002	February 2006	Toraichirō Ōta
Love Me Do (らぶみーどぅ, Rabu Mī Du)	July 2002	February 2006	Lulu Shinjō
Maomao (マオマオ)	July 2002	July 2006	Naphthalene Mizushima
Neko Kissa (ねこきっさ)	October 2002	June 2011	Nemigi Toto
Onmitsu ☆ Shōjo (隠密☆少女)	July 2002	February 2005	Ryōji Sekine
Pocket Journey (ぽけっとジャーニー)	July 2002	February 2005	Oyano Ōta
Shoulder-a-Coffin Kuro (棺担ぎのクロ。～懐中旅話～, Hitsugi Katsugi no Kuro. ~Kaichū Tabi no Wa~)	January 2005	June 2018	Satoko Kiyuzuki
Sister Equation (姉妹の方程式, Shimai no Hōteishiki)	May 2003	January 2007	Chiki Nonohara
Super Maid Chirumi-san (スーパーメイドちるみさん)	July 2002	March 2007	Tōko Shiwasu
Tenchō no Watanabe-san (てんちょおのワタナベさん)	July 2002	October 2005	Monta Tokita
Tennen Aluminium! (天然あるみにゅーむ！)	December 2007	March 2008	Komusō
Tenshi no Matsuei (てんしの末裔)	October 2002	January 2006	Jun Fujishima
Three Leaves, Three Colors (三者三葉, Sansha San'yō)	February 2003	January 2019	Cherry Arai
Torikoro (トリコロ)	October 2002	May 2004	Hairan
With Liz (うぃずりず, Wizurizu)	March 2006	February 2011	Yoshimi Sato
Year 1 Class 777 (1年777組, Ichi-Nen Nanana-Gumi)	October 2002	June 2008	Kazuki Shū
Kōtsugō Semi-Friend (好都合セミフレンド)	June 2023	September 2026	Minori Chigusa

== Anime adaptations ==
- Dōjin Work – Summer 2007
- K-On! – Spring 2009
- K-On!! – Spring 2010
- Place to Place – Spring 2012
- Yuyushiki – Spring 2013
- Three Leaves, Three Colors – Spring 2016
- Slow Start – Winter 2018
- Hoshikuzu Telepath – Fall 2023
- Ichijōma Mankitsu Gurashi! – Spring 2026

== Game adaptations ==
- K-On! Ho-kago Live!! – September 10, 2010
- Kirara Fantasia – December 11, 2017

== Kirara Fantasia ==
- Kirara Fantasia
- Volume 1 tankōbon cover, featuring (L-R): Miyako, Sae, Nori, Yuno, Kirara, Match, Lamp, Cocoa, Yasuna and Hana.

きららファンタジア (Kirara Fantajia)
- Genre: Action, fantasy, isekai, comedy
- Manga
- Written by: Kirara Fantasia Production Committee
- Illustrated by: Satoru Kōnosu
- Published by: Houbunsha
- Magazine: Comic FUZ
- Original run: October 8, 2019 – present
- Volumes: 4

Kirara Fantasia (きららファンタジア, Kirara Fantajia) is a free-to-play fantasy role-playing game developed by Drecom and Meteorise and published by Aniplex. The game is a crossover with characters from all Manga Time Kirara magazines. The game was released in Japan for iOS and Android devices in Japan on December 11, 2017.

The game's service ended on February 28, 2023; however, an offline mode is available for players who have created game data before that time.

=== Series represented ===
In the play, each work is treated as the Scriptures (聖典, Seiten) written by the goddess Sola, and the characters are called Cliemates (クリエメイト, Kuriemeito). Cliemates are summoned with the correct magic "Call" (コール, Kōru) used by Kirara or the wrong magic "Order" (オーダー, Ōdā) used by the enemy.

- Bocchi the Rock!
- Is the Order a Rabbit?
- Slow Start
- A Channel
- School-Live!
- Kiniro Mosaic
- New Game!
- Asteroid in Love
- Hidamari Sketch
- Magic of Stella
- Urara Meirocho
- Kill Me Baby
- Sakura Trick
- Blend S
- Dream Eater Merry
- Laid-Back Camp
- Hanayamata
- Comic Girls
- Anne Happy
- K-On!
- Harukana Receive
- Anima Yell!
- Three Leaves, Three Colors
- GA Geijutsuka Art Design Class
- Shoulder-a-Coffin Kuro
- The Demon Girl Next Door
- Harumination
- Gourmet Girl Graffiti
- Tamayomi
- Place to Place
- Dropout Idol Fruit Tart
- Power of Smile.
- Koharu Biyori.
- Slow Loop
- Yuyushiki
- RPG Real Estate

=== Collaborations ===
- Sanrio characters
- Manga Time
  - Ooya-san wa Shishunki!
  - Love Lab
  - Komori-san Can't Decline

=== Manga ===
On October 8, 2019, Houbunsha began publishing a manga adaptation of the series by Satoru Kōnosu in their online website and smartphone app Comic FUZ, with six tankōbon volumes released as of December, 2023.

No.	Release date	ISBN
1	April 3, 2020	978-4-8322-3728-5
2	June 1, 2021	978-4-8322-3831-2
3	November 1, 2021	978-4-8322-3868-8
4	September 1, 2022	978-4-8322-3940-1
5	April 2023	978-4-8322-3982-1
6	December 2023	978-4-8322-0345-7

=== Art book ===
Kirara Fantasia Illustrations was released as of December 2020.

No.	Release date	ISBN
1	December 11, 2020	978-4-8322-7235-4
2	January 12, 2021	978-4-8322-7243-9
3	December 12, 2022	978-4-8322-7426-6
4	January 26, 2023	978-4-8322-7434-1

== See also ==
- Manga Time Kirara Carat
- Manga Time Kirara Max
- Manga Time Kirara Forward
