= Blend S =

Japanese manga series

- Cover of the first manga volume, featuring Maika Sakuranomiya

ブレンド・S (Burendo Esu)
- Genre: Comedy, slice of life
- Manga
- Written by: Miyuki Nakayama
- Published by: Houbunsha
- English publisher: NA: Sol Press (former); Yen Press
- Magazine: Manga Time Kirara Carat
- Original run: October 2013 – June 2022
- Volumes: 8
- Anime television series
- Directed by: Ryōji Masuyama
- Produced by: Shōki Niwa; Hiroyuki Kobayashi; Noriko Kosukegawa; Yasuhira Tsuchikura; Taiki Onoue; Nobutaka Sakurai; Kishō Tsurita
- Written by: Gō Zappa
- Music by: Tomoki Kikuya
- Studio: A-1 Pictures
- Licensed by: NA: Aniplex of America; SEA: Medialink
- Original network: Tokyo MX, GYT, GTV, BS11, Kansai TV, TVA, AT-X
- English network: SEA: Animax Asia
- Original run: October 8, 2017 – December 24, 2017
- Episodes: 12
- icon

Blend S (ブレンド・S, Burendo Esu) is a Japanese four-panel comic strip manga written and illustrated by Miyuki Nakayama in Houbunsha's Manga Time Kirara Carat magazine from 2013 to 2022 and collected into eight volumes. A 12-episode anime television series adaptation produced by A-1 Pictures aired from October to December 2017.

== Plot ==
High school girl Maika Sakuranomiya has trouble finding a part-time job because of how scary she looks when smiling. However, she is scouted one day by an Italian man who is also the manager of Stile (/ˈstiːleɪ/ STEE-lay), a café where its waitresses are given unique traits such as tsundere and younger sister. Maika is given a sadistic trait because of her looks and has to adopt a dominant and cruel persona when servicing customers, particularly masochistic ones.

== Characters ==
Maika Sakuranomiya (桜ノ宮 苺香, Sakuranomiya Maika)
Voiced by: Azumi Waki
Maika is a 16-year-old girl who has a positive and cheerful personality, and unintentionally gains a sadistic look in her eyes whenever she smiles. This look catches the attention of Dino, who scouts her to be the "sadistic girl" waitress at Café Stile. Despite being told that the customers like being treated badly, her worrying about how she is treating customers gets the better of her, causing her to snap into an apologetic personality as soon as they have left. She comes from a very traditional family and works part-time, so she could study abroad using her own money. Her love of other countries also makes her develop an admiration towards Colonel Sanders (whom she refers to as the "old man from the chicken place") and Santa Claus. She adores Dino because of his blond hair, but is oblivious to his crush on her.
Kaho Hinata (日向 夏帆, Hinata Kaho)
Voiced by: Akari Kitō
Kaho is a 17-year-old waitress at Stile who acts as the tsundere. Although she plays a tsunderish role, Kaho's real personality is that of a carefree and energetic person, but she retains somewhat of a tsundere dynamic with Kōyō. She has trouble keeping up her persona when customers are discussing video games, feeling the need to join in. She is currently the most popular waitress at Stile. It is hinted that she has feelings for Kōyō due to the comedic situations she gets into with him.
Mafuyu Hoshikawa (星川 麻冬, Hoshikawa Mafuyu)
Voiced by: Anzu Haruno
Mafuyu is another waitress at Stile who is actually a 20-year-old college student, but she plays the younger sister character because of her petite figure. Her real personality is mature and rarely shows emotions, but she easily gets excited whenever her favorite series, Aikatsu! (Magical Frill in the anime), is involved. She has a younger brother who is taller than her, and she has always wanted a younger sister, although she will not include Kaho because of her body figure. Although she plays a younger sister character, she has a degree of contempt towards lolicons, and once turned down a customer who asked her out because she believed he was only interested in her because of her young appearance.
Miu Amano (天野 美雨, Amano Miu)
Voiced by: Atsumi Tanezaki
Miu is a waitress who fulfills the older sister trait. She usually wears glasses, although she wears contacts when at work at the café. She is 22 years old, and usually behaves elegantly; however, she is also a dōjinshi artist in a group called "Hanazono Folder" that draws adult comics, and on occasion muses about scenarios for her dōjinshi with rather creepy details. After accidentally leaving one of her works at the café when she visited as a customer, Dino scouted her, and she agreed to get inspiration for her dōjinshi. One of her hobbies is observing people, particularly the relationship between Dino and Maika; she even uses them as models in her dōjinshi, despite Dino's strong objection.
Hideri Kanzaki (神崎 ひでり, Kanzaki Hideri)
Voiced by: Sora Tokui
Hideri is a 16-year-old "waitress" who fulfills the idol trait. Hideri is actually a boy who dresses as a girl and aspires to become an idol. He works at Stile to gain fans; giving proof to his parents that he is talented, or else he has to inherit his family's farm. While he acts like a "cute" girl all the time, he can unintentionally become manly. Although friendly and energetic, he is also incredibly vain and believes himself to be incredibly cute, often bragging about how much his alleged fanbase admires him. He is also very picky over clothes, preferring to wear cute and Gothic outfits instead of funny and sexy clothes, much to Miu's annoyance. He occasionally attempts to help Dino get closer to Maika; however, Dino usually ends up messing up the opportunity in one way or another.
Dino (ディーノ, Dīno)
Voiced by: Tomoaki Maeno
Dino is a 26-year-old Italian manager of Stile and works in the kitchen. He loves anime girls and figurines, and often stays up late to watch late night anime. His nose bleeds whenever he gets excited. Due to his attraction for Japanese girls, particularly black-haired ones, he develops an open crush on Maika, although Maika herself is oblivious to this fact. He lives on the second floor above Stile and took in a dog named Owner (オーナー) per Maika's request. Due to his eccentric personality, he is often accused by the other employees of being perverted, and on one occasion even gets arrested due to describing his attraction to Maika in public.
Kōyō Akizuki (秋月 紅葉, Akizuki Kōyō)
Voiced by: Tatsuhisa Suzuki
Kōyō is the 21-year-old chef at Stile who loves yuri and always wants to see female customers being friendly to each other to fire his imagination. Working at the same station as Dino, he has to work harder because the latter often slacks off. Like Kaho, he is also a gamer and later becomes more conscious of her. He often gets flustered whenever he inadvertently sees Kaho's breasts, and later develops somewhat of a tsundere dynamic with her.
Aika Sakuranomiya (桜ノ宮 愛香, Sakuranomiya Aika)
Voiced by: Rei Matsuzaki
Aika is Maika's older sister who dresses in a yamato nadeshiko manner. She often worries about Maika because of her scary eyes. Like her sister, Aika is a natural sadistic character. She mistakes Dino as Maika's boyfriend.
Kōichi Sakuranomiya (桜ノ宮 香一, Sakuranomiya Kōichi)
Voiced by: Shinki Satō
Kōichi is Aika and Maika's older brother who is recognizable from his black hair with bangs parted in the middle. Like his sisters, he is a natural sadistic character. He is worried about Maika who has few friends because of her scary eyes. Like Aika, he mistakes Dino as Maika's boyfriend.

== Media ==
=== Manga ===
Blend S is a four-panel comic strip manga written and illustrated by Miyuki Nakayama. It made its first appearance in Houbunsha's Manga Time Kirara Carat magazine with the October 2013 issue, and began serialization in the magazine with the March 2014 issue. The last chapter was published in the June issue on April 28, 2022. Eight tankōbon volumes of the manga have been released from January 27, 2015, to May 26, 2022. The manga was licensed in North America by Sol Press before it went out of business and left the translation unfinished with only one volume published. At Anime Expo 2024, Yen Press announced that they licensed the series for English publication.

No.	Original release date	Original ISBN	English release date	English ISBN
1	January 27, 2015	978-4-8322-4520-4	December 23, 2020 (SP, digital); December 17, 2024 (YP)	979-8-8554-0606-1
2	February 27, 2016	978-4-8322-4667-6	April 29, 2025	979-8-8554-0608-5
3	January 27, 2017	978-4-8322-4798-7	September 2, 2025	979-8-8554-0610-8
4	October 27, 2017	978-4-8322-4885-4	March 24, 2026	979-8-8554-0612-2
5	January 25, 2019	978-4-8322-7062-6	January 26, 2027	979-8-8554-0614-6
6	March 27, 2020	978-4-8322-7179-1	—	—
7	March 26, 2021	978-4-8322-7264-4	—	—
8	May 26, 2022	978-4-8322-7368-9	—	—

=== Anime ===
An anime television series adaptation, directed by Ryōji Masuyama and produced by A-1 Pictures, premiered on October 8, 2017. Gō Zappa supervised the series' scripts and Yōsuke Okuda designed the characters. Go Zappa wrote the screenplay, and Tomoki Kikuya composed the music. Aniplex of America licensed the anime for release in North America. The opening theme "Bon Appétit♡S" (ぼなぺてぃーと♡S, Bonapetīto♡Esu) and ending theme "Detarame na Minus to Plus ni Okeru Blend Kō" (デタラメなマイナスとプラスにおけるブレンド考, Detarame na Mainasu to Purasu ni Okeru Burendo Kō) are performed by Maika Sakuranomiya (Azumi Waki), Kaho Hinata (Akari Kitō), and Mafuyu Hoshikawa (Anzu Haruno) under the unit name Blend A (pronounced Blend Ace).

In November 2017, the opening theme of the series became a viral meme on Twitter and YouTube, which consists of adding an additional word to the opening part of the song: "Smile, Sweet, Sister, Sadistic, Surprise, Service...", followed by that word, which may refer to pop culture or another popular meme, regardless of whether it starts with the letter S or not, instead of "We are Stile!!". In November 2026, the opening theme was used for a United States Navy recruitment video.

No.	Title (Note: All English titles are taken from Crunchyroll.)	Original release date
1	"First-Time Super Sadist" "Hajimete no Do Esu" (Japanese: はじめてのドS)	October 8, 2017
Maika Sakuranomiya wants to gain a part time job so she can earn enough money to study abroad, but she is constantly getting rejected for placements due to the menacing look she often gains in her eyes whenever she smiles. One day she happens upon Café Stile, a coffee shop where the Italian manager, Dino, becomes infatuated with her menacing look and wants her to be the "sadistic" waitress for the café. Maika successfully, yet partly through her own clumsiness, serves a pair of masochistic customers under this persona, and decides to take the position. She also meets and befriends Kaho Hinata, the tsundere waitress, and Mafuyu Hoshikawa, the younger sister waitress, spending the evening at the arcade with them, after learning that the former is obsessed with video games. The next day, Maika kisses Dino as she thought that it was a greeting, only for Dino to nosebleed.
2	"Sweets Without Honor" "Jingi Naki Suītsu" (Japanese: 仁義なきスイーツ)	October 15, 2017
Maika attempts to practice being a sadist, and decides to try smiling while serving the customers. However, her smile just comes across sadistic anyway. Meanwhile, Maika attempts to talk to an English speaking customer, Akizuki tests the idea of female customers by having Maika and Kaho feed each other dessert, and Mafuyu fights with Dino over a magical girl figurine won by Kaho. The Stile staff hold their seasonal tradition of deciding on a new menu item via a competition between two teams. Maika unintentionally uses salt, vinegar, and Tabasco sauce in her and Mafuyu's parfait, although the dessert becomes popular due to the customers considering it a sadism dessert made by Maika. Having won the competition, Maika says her prize is having had fun with her friends, whereas Mafuyu makes Maika dress up in a magical girl outfit she won as her own prize.
3	"After the Date, Rated R" "Dēto Nochi Jūhachi-kin" (Japanese: デートのち18禁)	October 22, 2017
Maika reveals to Dino how her obsession with foreign cultures began after seeing a foreign visitor of her father's, and how it affected her childhood. Afterwards Dino goes on a date with Maika, although Maika invites Akizuki and Kaho along thinking it's an outing for the Stile staff. Dino tries to buy Maika a present, at the two's advisement, which results in Dino and Maika buying each other matching gifts. Later, a hentai dōjinshi about a schoolgirl in bondage that a customer left behind causes problems for the Stile staff. They attempt to locate the owner by discreetly asking their customers about it, eventually putting up a notice about a lost "self-published book". The owner responds to the notice, and to everyone's surprise, is revealed to be a young woman.
4	"The New Girl is a Big Sister" "Kōhai wa Onee-san (Kenzen)" (Japanese: 後輩はおねえさん（健全）)	October 29, 2017
The author of the dōjinshi, Miu Amano, is hired as the café's "big sister" archetype. She mistakes Maika and Dino for a couple, and begins using them as a basis for her dōjinshi, although she learns from Kaho that Dino's feelings are currently one-sided. Feedback from customers reveals that they want Maika to be more sadistic, so the others attempt to "train" her, via sadistic anime, dark and violent video games, etc. This results in Maika's persona and attire turning full dominatrix; however, she is relieved when she is told to tone it back again when serving most customers, limiting this extreme style to only those few who would want it. Post-credits, Maika unintentionally "water tortures" a customer while trying to provide swift refill service.
5	"Cold After the Rain" "Ame Nochi Kaze" (Japanese: 雨のちカゼ)	November 5, 2017
It's ponytail day, so the café staff have all formed their hair into ponytails. Maika has problems with static electricity due to her hair being so thin, so Dino gives her a foreign treatment for her hair. Later, a rainstorm prompts Dino to walk Maika to the train station. Meanwhile Kaho and Akizuki both stay late due to being adsorbed in a mobile game, and are accidentally locked in the break room by Dino. The following day Dino is distraught because Maika has a bad cold from the rain, so him, Kaho, and Mafuyu decide to pay her a visit. During the visit they meet Maika's older brother and sister, Kōichi and Aika, who are surprised to find that Maika has friends. They mistake Dino for Maika's boyfriend, with their "interrogation" of him for information ends up incurring Maika's wrath.
6	"By The Waterfront Et Cetera (For Adults)" "Mizube ni Matsuwaru Etosetora (Seijin-zumi)" (Japanese: 水辺にまつわるエトセトラ（成人済）)	November 12, 2017
Maika, Dino, and Mafuyu are at the riverbank for a barbecue, while Kaho, Miu, and Kouyou, who rather would have stayed indoors, were forced to come along. Maika brings along a big tuna for the barbecue, Dino slices and grills it so that everyone can enjoy eating it. As the sun sets and the café staff return home, Dino notices that Maika wanted to go to the beach one day. The next day, Maika and Dino go shopping to buy a swimsuit for her. The following day, the café staff are all at the beach. Kouyou becomes awkward because of Kaho's revealing bikini. Later, while going to buy shaved ice, Maika cuts herself on her foot and Dino treats her foot with a bandage. As the sun sets, Dino asks Maika if she had an enjoyable time, to which she responds yes.
7	"Busy with Bananas and Strawberries" "Banana ni Ichigo de, Isogashii" (Japanese: バナナにイチゴで、いそがしい)	November 19, 2017
Before they open the café, Kaho arrives and she is all tanned. Maika, on the other hand, only has a sunburn on her face. Then, Dino produces an idea. The next day, it is jungle day, and everything in Café Stile is revamped accordingly. Maika is embarrassed as she got the customers lost in the jungle. Mafuyu wears a monkey costume. Maika and Kouyou watch the way Miu is feeding the customer with a banana. Later, Kouyou gets irritated when he is getting lost as well, and ends up touching Kaho's breast by accident. The following day, Dino is shocked that the café is all out of strawberries, so he and Maika go to the supermarket. Unfortunately, the strawberries are sold out, so they go to other supermarkets, but to no avail. Meanwhile, Kaho, Mafuyu, and Miu suggest the customers to order the banana crepes and orange tart to buy some time. Elsewhere, Maika finally finds the last pack of strawberries, only to meet a little girl who starts crying due to Maika's glare. Fortunately, the little girl and her mother, charmed by Dino, let them have the strawberries. On their way back, Maika feels bad about the way she glared at the little girl and thinks about quitting her job, but Dino comforts her and tells her that he and the customers like her and her gaze, but he gets too enthusiastic and is arrested by a cop who thinks he was pestering her. Later that night, the café staff suggest that they should hire another staff member. The next day, a certain person is going for a job application at Café Stile.
8	"An Idol Character, Too" "Aidoru Zokusei mo, Tsuitemasu" (Japanese: アイドル属性も、ついてます)	November 26, 2017
Hideri Kanzaki is hired as the café's "idol" archetype, though Maika had to lend Hideri her waitress clothes since Dino does not have that one clothes just for Hideri. At first, the café staff thought Hideri is a girl, but then they were surprised that Hideri is actually a boy. Hideri explained to them that his dream is to become a cute idol despite his gender. The next day, Hideri learned about Dino's feelings for Maika, so he suggested Dino to compliment Maika, though it ended badly. During closing time, Dino finally confessed his feelings for Maika, though it was not what Hideri and Kouyou had in mind. The following day, Miu met up with Hideri, and then they went to a mall in order to buy a uniform for him, though they couldn't find what was Hideri looking for. As the sun sets, Miu suggested that Hideri should ask Mafuyu if she has any outfits that she doesn't need. The next day, Mafuyu makes Hideri dress up in a magical girl outfit, though he doesn't want to wear it during work. Then, Mafuyu and Miu makes him wear a kindergarten uniform, much to Hideri's dismay. Post-credits, it's school day, so Miu is wearing a caretaker outfit while the rest are wearing the kindergarten uniforms, including Hideri, this happens to be a nightmare Hideri was having; as shown when he wakes up.
9	"Owner Inauguration, Sister Attack" "Ōnā Shūnin, Shisutā Shūrai" (Japanese: オーナー就任、シスター襲来)	December 3, 2017
Maika brings a big stray dog she found to Café Stile. Unfortunately, she cannot keep the dog at home because her siblings hate dogs. Maika looks for someone to adopt it but does not find any takers. Eventually, Dino is pressed into taking care of the dog named "Owner", whose menacing eyes resemble Maika's, at least until a willing owner can be found. However, Dino regretted his decision because he was forced to walk the dog in the morning. Meanwhile, Maika decides to bake sweets for Dino to show her appreciation. Later, Maika's older sister Aika comes to visit her at work. Aika was impressed when she saw her sister doing a decent job at serving the customers with her sadism. But Aika threatens Dino with a spear, thinking that he made Maika cry. However, Maika told her that he was only cheering her up, so Aika apologized for jumping to conclusions. As Aika returns home, Maika's brother Kōichi was hiding while crying about not being invited to Cafe Stile. Then, the cafe staff notices that Dino has gained weight, which turns out it was Maika who gave him too many sweets. The next day, to lose weight, Dino was once again forced to walk the dog, Owner.
10	"I'll Teach You" "Oshiete Ageru" (Japanese: おしえて、あ・げ・る)	December 10, 2017
A customer of Café Stile confesses his affection to Mafuyu. However, not only is there a considerable height difference between them, but the gap between the character she plays for the customers and her true self is so wide that Mafuyu goes immediately into rejection mode. Mafuyu's little brother, on the other hand, worries that his sister will never have a boyfriend. Meanwhile, when Kaho's string of failing marks at school has prompted her mother to ban all video games unless she can get an average score or higher on a big makeup test, Mafuyu agrees to supervise Kaho's study sessions. The next day, Kaho spent all night studying and she could not get enough sleep. Mafuyu then gives Kaho a makeover to cover her baggy eyes. But all of a sudden, Mafuyu also gave Kouyou a makeover after falling for Hideri's trick. The next day, Kaho finally passed her makeup test with a higher score. Mafuyu was proud of Kaho for passing the test, though she told her that the next time they go to a different cafe, Kaho must study hard for her to not fail the test again. Post-credits, Kaho was drinking a black coffee while telling Maika that it was a flavor from "a big sister".
11	"Good at Tsundere, Bad at Cornering" "Tsundere Jōzu, Kabe Don wa Heta" (Japanese: ツンデレ上手、壁ドンは下手)	December 17, 2017
On their day off, Dino goes to the park with Maika and the dog, Owner. The time he spends with Maika is like a dream, while Owner falls in love with another dog. Meanwhile, at Café Stile, Kaho is extremely depressed after accidentally deleting all the data from her favorite video game. Akizuki makes things worse with his usual lack of delicacy, but then tries to console Kaho. He then makes a strawberry parfait to cheer her up, only to find out that Kaho feels all better when a customer gives her a plushy to cheer her up. Kaho then realized that he made that parfait for her so she will look forward to eat it next time. Later, Dino wanted to confess his feelings for Maika by cornering her, but it was not what Hideri was hoping for. Dino then tries cornering Maika again during work, but she angrily tells him to move away, causing him to be depressed. Post-credits, Maika feels bad for being mad at him, so she corners him while apologizing to him, thus making Dino feel better.
12	"I Love You!" "Daisuki desu!" (Japanese: 大好きですっ!)	December 24, 2017
The members of Café Stile go on a ski trip. Dino is determined to confess his feelings to Maika, but rapid developments ensue when Maika, just out of the bath, interrupts him. Is Maika going to beat Dino to the punch and confess her love for him? The next day, Kaho, Miu and Mafuyu hear Maika make an unexpected, shocking confession! But then they soon realize that Maika only had a dream where Dino confessed his love for her. When Maika confessed her love for Dino with her sadistic look, Dino was unaware and apologized for his actions. Later, on Christmas Eve, the cafe staff were enjoying a leftover cake. Dino told the staff the day that Kaho and Akizuki were the first two people to be hired at Cafe Stile, which turns out that they were nervous at first, much to their anger. He then told them the day that Mafuyu was hired, though he only dragged her all the way to the cafe the minute she activated her alarm in case of strangers like Dino. Finally, when Maika remembered that Dino finally confessed his love for her, she finally confessed her love for not only Dino, but the entire staff as well. Post-credits, Maika welcomed the viewer with her sadistic look. Then, Maika and Dino met again, and this time they went together.

=== Video game ===
Characters from the series appear alongside other Manga Time Kirara characters in the mobile RPG, Kirara Fantasia in 2018.

== See also ==
- Shota Oni – Another manga by the same author
- Spirits & Cat Ears – Another manga by the same author
