= Pleasuredome =

Pleasuredome or Pleasure Dome may refer to:

- A stately palace built by Khan in "Kubla Khan", a poem by Samuel Taylor Coleridge
- Pleasuredome (night club), a nightclub owned by Audrey Joseph
- Pleasure Dome (railcar), a car on the Super Chief passenger train, named for the Coleridge poem
- The Quiet Zone/The Pleasure Dome, 1977 album by Van der Graaf Generator
- Pleasure Dome, a 2000 yaoi manga by Minami Megumi
- "Pleasure Dome", a song by Van Halen from the 1991 album For Unlawful Carnal Knowledge
- Mr. Khan's Pleasure Dome - fictional location in The Day of the Locust
