= Anima Yell! =

Japanese manga and anime series

- Cover of Anima Yell! volume 1 by Houbunsha featuring Kohane Hatoya

アニマエール！ (Anima Ēru!)
- Genre: Sports (Cheerleading)
- Manga
- Written by: Tsukasa Unohana
- Published by: Houbunsha
- Magazine: Manga Time Kirara Carat
- Original run: February 2016 – August 2020
- Volumes: 5
- Anime television series
- Directed by: Masako Sato
- Produced by: Takashi Yoshizawa; Hiroki Kuboki
- Written by: Fumihiko Shimo
- Music by: manzo; Hiroaki Tsutsumi
- Studio: Doga Kobo
- Licensed by: Crunchyroll: SEA: Medialink
- Original network: AT-X, Tokyo MX, BS11
- Original run: October 7, 2018 – December 23, 2018
- Episodes: 12

Anima Yell! (Japanese: アニマエール！, Hepburn: Anima Ēru!) is a Japanese four-panel manga series by Tsukasa Unohana. It was serialized in Houbunsha's seinen manga magazine Manga Time Kirara Carat from its April 2016 to October 2020 issues and has been collected in five tankōbon volumes. An anime television series adaptation by Doga Kobo aired from October 7 to December 23, 2018.

== Plot ==
The story focuses on Kohane Hatoya, a girl who is constantly helping others. Taking an interest in cheerleading, Kohane decides to start up her own Cheer Club upon entering her freshman year at Kaminoki High School, recruiting her best friend Uki Sawatari and veteran cheerleader Hizume Arima.

== Characters ==
Kohane Hatoya (鳩谷 こはね, Hatoya Kohane)
Voiced by: Yuka Ozaki
A peppy girl who constantly comes to the help whenever someone is in trouble, often getting hurt in the process. She takes a strong interest in cheerleading, despite having a fear of heights from her childhood.
Hizume Arima (有馬 ひづめ, Arima Hizume)
Voiced by: Yuina Yamada
A veteran cheerleader who was thrown out of her old cheer squad for being too good. She is convinced by Kohane to take up cheerleading again, but often worries about ending up alone again.
Uki Sawatari (猿渡 宇希, Sawatari Uki)
Voiced by: Mikako Izawa
Kohane's childhood friend who is often worried about her safety when she tries to help people. Pleased to find she has found something to do for herself, Uki supports Kohane's interest and joins her Cheer Club.
Kotetsu Tatejima (舘島 虎徹, Tatejima Kotetsu)
Voiced by: Tomori Kusunoki
Kohane's classmate, who often lacks confidence and is embarrassed about her strong sounding name.
Kana Ushiku (牛久 花和, Ushiku Kana)
Voiced by: Haruka Shiraishi
A twin-tailed girl who keeps an eye on the Cheer Club from a long distance.
Ms. Inukai (犬養先生, Inukai-sensei)
Voiced by: Eriko Matsui
Kohane's homeroom teacher.
Kon Akitsune (秋常 紺, Akitsune Kon)
Voiced by: Hiyori Kono
Kohane's classmate and Kotetsu's best friend. Kon is a lesbian who is able to successfully confess to her crush thanks to the Cheer Club's help.
Basketball-senpai (バスケ先輩, Basuke-senpai)
Voiced by: Yurina Furukawa
The captain of the Basketball Club who has a boyish appearance. Her real name is Shiona Kujirai (鯨井 汐凪, Kujirai Shiona).
Home Economics Club President (家庭科部部長, Ieniwaka-bu Buchō)
Voiced by: Nao Natsuno
Akane Sawatari (猿渡 暁音, Sawatari Akane)
Voiced by: Aimi Tanaka
Suzuko Nekoya (根古屋 鈴子, Nekoya Suzuko)
Voiced by: Risae Matsuda
Tamako Nekoya (根古屋 珠子, Nekoya Tamako)
Voiced by: Satsumi Matsuda

== Media ==
=== Manga ===
Anima Yell! began as a four-panel manga series written and illustrated by Tsukasa Unohana, which was serialized in Houbunsha's seinen manga magazine Manga Time Kirara Carat from February 2016 to August 2020. The series' chapters have been compiled into five tankōbon volumes published by Houbunsha as of September 25, 2020.

No.	Release date	ISBN
1	February 27, 2017	978-4-8322-4807-6
2	January 27, 2018	978-4-8322-4914-1
3	September 27, 2018	978-4-8322-4978-3
4	July 25, 2019	978-4-8322-7110-4
5	September 25, 2020	978-4-8322-7214-9

=== Anime ===
An anime television series adaptation produced by Doga Kobo aired from October 7 to December 23, 2018, on AT-X, Tokyo MX, and BS11. The anime is directed by Masako Sato, with scripts penned by Fumihiko Shimo and character designs handled by Manamu Amasaki. The opening theme is "Jump Up↑Yell!! (ジャンプアップ↑エール!!, Jump Appu↑ Eiru!!), and the ending theme is "One for All", both performed by Yuka Ozaki, Yuina Yamada, Mikako Izawa, Tomori Kusunoki, and Haruka Shiraishi. Crunchyroll streamed the series. The series ran for 12 episodes.

No.	Title (Note: All English episode titles are taken from Crunchyroll.)	Original release date
1	"My First Time Cheerleading" "Hajimete no Chia" (Japanese: はじめてのチア)	October 7, 2018
Becoming obsessed with cheerleading on first sight, Kohane Hatoya is downhearted upon discovering her new school, Kaminoki High, doesn't have a cheerleading club. Recognising student Hizume Arima as one of the cheerleaders she saw, Kohane decides to form her own Cheer Club, but finds that Hizume is unwilling to become a member. As Kohane unsuccessfully tries to recruit Hizume, who lashes out at her after she inadvertently touches on something traumatic, her friend Uki Sawatari hears that Hizume was forced out of her old cheerleading team for being too good. Wanting to prove that she is taking cheerleading serious, Kohane trains herself to overcome her fear of heights, convincing Hizume to join her Cheer Club.
2	"Cute Yet Cool" "Kawaii kedo Kakkoi" (Japanese: かわいいけどかっこいい)	October 14, 2018
Hizume begins training Kotone to build her physical prowess, giving her her old practise uniform. Feeling Kotone will improve better with motivation, Hizume follows Uki's advice and teaches them how to make pom poms. As Kotone tries to convince Uki to join the cheerleading club, Hizume shows her a cheer routine, convincing her to join.
3	"The Cheer Association, Cheering For Love!" "Chia Dōkō-kai, Koi no Ōen" (Japanese: チア同好会、恋の応援)	October 21, 2018
With club activities on hold, Hizume and Uki try to help Kohane study for exams, though soon worry that she is too focused on studying. Having recruited three members, the girls are approved as an association and given the old AV room to practise in. Afterwards, the gang help classmate Kon Akitsune confess to her private tutor, remaining dedicated to helping her after learning that her crush is a woman, leading to a successful confession.
4	"Let's Cheer Up!"	October 28, 2018
The captain of the basketball club asks the Cheer Association to cheer for them during a match. Noticing Kon's friend Kotetsu Tatejima showing interest in the association, the girls ask her to join on a trial basis, but find she is too lacking in confidence to accept. With pre-made uniforms proving too expensive, the girls make their own uniforms in time for the basketball match, with Kohane making pom poms for everyone in the crowd. As Kaminoki win the match thanks to everyone's cheering, Kotetsu, becoming awed by the girls' performance, decides to join the Cheer Association.
5	"Arm Motions With a Smile" "Egao de Āmu Mōshon" (Japanese: 笑顔でアームモーション)	November 4, 2018
The girls hold a welcoming party for Kotetsu before starting her off with some warmup stretches and arm motions. Later, the girls are asked to help the home economics club decide on a menu for a cooking contest. Upon learning that the basketball club asked the home ec club to thank them on their behalf, the girls decide to give their thanks in return with a cheer.
6	"Super Exciting Double Base Thigh Stand" "Dokidoki Daburu Bēsu Sai Sutando" (Japanese: どきどきダブルベースサイスタンド)	November 11, 2018
When the girls are asked to perform for the opening ceremony for a local festival, they decide to implement a Double Base Thigh Stand into their routine with Kohane at the top. On the day of the festival, Kotetsu gets nervous, but manages to regain her courage during the performance, which proves to be a success.
7	"The One on Top is Scared of Heights" "Toppu wa Kōsho Kyōfu-shō" (Japanese: トップは高所恐怖症)	November 18, 2018
While Kotetsu worries about her weight, Kohane explains how she came to have her fear of heights. Later, as the girls go to a cheer shop for cheerleading supplies, Hizume asks the other for advice on how to get along with her classmates. After Hizume manages to overcome this situation with Kohane's help, the others are confronted by Kana Ushiku, who claims that Hizume is too good for the Cheer Association.
8	"Senpai and Me" "Senpai to Atashi" (Japanese: せんぱいとあたし)	November 25, 2018
While remaining curious about Kana, who was part of Hizume's old cheer squad, the girls are asked to cheer again for the basketball team and try to come up with their own choreography. A few days later, Kana calls Uki to the roof to ask why Hizume joined the Cheer Association only to slip on a puddle, leading Uki to sprain her ankle protecting her. With Uki unable to perform as a result, Kana takes her place on the team on the day of the basketball match. Noticing how much fun Hizume is having while also realising for herself how much fun cheerleading can be, Kana decides to join the Cheer Association.
9	"The Captain is Chosen! Five-Person Cheer Squad" "Buchō Kettei! Gonin no Chia" (Japanese: 部長決定!五人のチア)	December 2, 2018
With enough members to upgrade the Cheer Association into an official club, the girls assign Kohane as president and get homeroom teacher Inukai to be their advisor. The club is then requested to cheer for a soccer team that includes Uki's younger brother Akane, who doesn't have the fondest impression of cheerleaders. On the day of the match, as Akane sits on the bench, Uki and the others encourage him to cheer along with them, which leads him to get chosen to play during the second half.
10	"Socks and Summer Training Camp" "Kutsushita to Natsu Gasshuku" (Japanese: くつ下と夏合宿)	December 9, 2018
The Cheer Club is requested to watch over the manga club as they try to finish a manuscript by the next day. With a cheerleading tournament coming up, the girls go on a training camp at the beach, where Hizume has trouble getting close with Kana.
11	"Exciting Shoulder Straddle" "Harahara Shorudā Sutoradoru" (Japanese: はらはらショルダーストラドル)	December 16, 2018
Seeking to help Kohane get over her fear of heights, the girls practise how to do a shoulder straddle, managing to perform it successfully during an event the next day. Later, as the girls pick out their cheer outfits for the tournament, they run into the Suzuko and Tamako Nekoya from Hizume's old team.
12	"One for All, All for One"	December 23, 2018
The day of the cheerleading tournament arrives, with Hizume managing to patch things up with her former teammates. As the girls go to perform, Kohane feels the pressure of living up to the other teams, but the others show their support, encouraging her to be her usual self. Despite not making it into the preliminaries, the team are praised for having fun with their performance.

=== Video game ===
Characters from the series appear alongside other Manga Time Kirara characters in the 2018 mobile RPG, Kirara Fantasia.

== Music ==
Opening Theme

- Jump Up↑Yell!! by Kaminoki High School Cheerleading Club (Yuka Ozaki)

Insert Song

- CRAZY GONNA CRAZY by YURiKA (Episode 11)
- One Day by MB Padfield (Episode 12)

== Reception ==
Anime News Network had five editors review the first episode of the anime: Nick Creamer found the humor "too mild and one-note" to illicit any laughter and the characterization of Kohane and Arima feeling "underwritten" but gave credit to the aesthetic work of both the backgrounds and facial expressions, and the jokes having effective sound design to emphasize them; Theron Martin was mixed about Kohane's overall character, saying she can be grating at times and misinterpret things heard but admired her for having tons of enthusiasm and heart to be proactive in conquering her fears and being a motivational voice towards Arima's low self-worth as a cheerleader; James Beckett was critical of Kohane's obnoxious persistence to make friends with Arima and start a cheerleading club but felt that character quirk will be fixed in later episodes to deliver on both its slice-of-life and sports content with decent cheerleading animation and cutesy antics, saying it will be "perfectly acceptable candy-coated fluff" for its target audience; Paul Jensen agreed with Beckett's sentiments towards Kohane's overly upbeat personality being an annoyance and criticized the repetitious and over-explanation of its characters throughout the episode. The fifth reviewer, Rebecca Silverman, also echoed what both Beckett and Jensen said about Kohane but was optimistic that she'll grow up into a more tolerable character as the series continues, concluding that "In the meantime, this feels like a slightly more exciting Cute Girls Doing Cute Things show than we normally get; in fact, it may be a full-out sports show, although I'm inclined to think it'll land somewhere in the middle. The animation for the dancing looks smooth and the characters are all distinct and distinctly cute, so if you can handle Kohane's constant barrage, this episode makes it look like Anima Yell! could be very appealing."

== See also ==
- Gokigenyō, Ikkyoku Ika ga?, another manga series by the same author
- Pon no Michi, an original anime series with a manga adaptation by the same author
