= Gokicha =

2009 4-panel manga series by Rui Tamachi

- Cover of first manga volume published by Houbunsha

ごきチャ
- Genre: Comedy
- Manga
- Written by: Rui Tamachi
- Published by: Houbunsha
- Magazine: Manga Time Kirara Carat
- Original run: January 28, 2011 – June 28, 2016
- Volumes: 5
- Original net animation

Gokicha!! Cockroach Girls
- Studio: MooGoo; Wao World
- Released: September 14, 2012

Gokicha (Japanese: ごきチャ; lit. "Cockroach Girls") is a 4-panel manga series created by Rui Tamachi revolving around anthropomorphised cockroaches. The manga originally existed as self-published doujin works, first released at Comiket in 2009, before beginning serialization in Houbunsha's Manga Time Kirara Carat magazine from March 2011 to August 2016. An anime adaptation by Movic began releasing on Nico Nico Douga in 2012.

== Characters ==
Gokicha (ごきチャ)
Voiced by: Mamiko Noto
An anthropomorphised cockroach girl who wishes to become friends with humans, but is often treated with the appropriate response.
Chaba (ちゃば)
Voiced by: Rie Kugimiya
Another cockroach girl who is a bit more tomboyish in personality.
Part Time Girl (アルバイトの女性, Arubaito no Josei)
A girl working a part time job who appears in the Houbunsha serialization.
Part Time Boy (アルバイトの男性, Arubaito no Dansei)
A boy who is the Part Time Girl's underclassman.
Chocolate (ショコラ, Shokora)
The cute cat that plays with Gokicha.

== Media ==
=== Manga ===
Gokicha originally existed as a doujin work self-published by Rui Tamachi. The first volume, Gokicha!!, was released at Comiket 77 in December 2009, while the second volume, Gokicha!!!, was released at Comiket 78 in August 2010. The manga then began serialization in the September 2011 issue of Houbunsha's Manga Time Kirara Carat magazine released on July 28, 2011. The first tankoubon volume was released on July 26, 2012, the fourth on August 27, 2015. The fifth and final volume was released on August 10, 2016.

=== Anime ===
An anime adaptation titled Gokicha!! Cockroach Girls has been produced by Movic and began streaming on Nico Nico Douga from September 14, 2012. The opening theme is "Gokkyun! Days" (ごっきゅん!デイズ, Gokkyun! Deizu) by Saki while the ending theme is "Beginning" (はじまる, Hajimaru) by Saki.
