= Asteroid in Love =

Japanese manga series

- Cover of the first tankōbon volume, featuring Mira Konohata (top) and Ao Manaka (bottom).

恋する小惑星 (Koisuru Asuteroido)
- Genre: Slice of life
- Manga
- Written by: Quro
- Published by: Houbunsha
- Magazine: Manga Time Kirara Carat
- Original run: January 28, 2017 – June 28, 2024
- Volumes: 6
- Anime television series
- Directed by: Daisuke Hiramaki
- Written by: Yuka Yamada
- Music by: Takurō Iga
- Studio: Doga Kobo
- Licensed by: Crunchyroll (streaming); AUS: Madman Entertainment; SA/SEA: Muse Communication
- Original network: AT-X, Tokyo MX, SUN, KBS, TVA, BS11
- Original run: January 3, 2020 – March 27, 2020
- Episodes: 12
- icon

Asteroid in Love (恋する小惑星(アステロイド), Koisuru Asuteroido) is a Japanese four-panel manga series by Quro, serialized in Houbunsha's seinen manga magazine Manga Time Kirara Carat from January 2017 to June 2024. It has been collected in six tankōbon volumes. An anime television series adaptation by Doga Kobo aired from January to March 2020.

== Plot ==
During her childhood, a girl named Mira Konohata befriends Ao Manaka, who she believes is a boy, and makes a promise with Ao to discover an asteroid. Upon entering high school, Mira joins the earth sciences club, a merger of the school's astronomy and geology clubs, and reunites with Ao, who she discovers is actually a girl. Alongside their fellow club members, Mira and Ao take part in various astronomical and geological activities in the hopes of one day discovering an asteroid.

== Characters ==
Mira Konohata (木ノ幡 みら, Konohata Mira)
rusty-red hair, gradient blue-to-yellow eyes
Voiced by: Tomoyo Takayanagi (Japanese); Lindsay Seidel (English)
The main protagonist of the story, who joins the earth sciences club in her first year and becomes vice-president in her second year. She took an interest in astronomy after meeting Ao as a child and is determined to discover an asteroid with her.
Ao Manaka (真中 あお, Manaka Ao)
blue-violet hair, cyan eyes
Voiced by: Megumi Yamaguchi (Japanese); Morgan Berry (English)
An astronomy fanatic who was initially mistaken by Mira to be a boy when she was a child. She becomes the club's treasurer in her second year, when she also moves in with Mira to fulfill her dream of finding an asteroid with her while her parents are away.
Mai Inose (猪瀬 舞, Inose Mai)
blond-yellow hair, grass green eyes
Voiced by: Maria Sashide (Japanese); Bryn Apprill (English)
Earth sciences club member and former member of the geology club, nicknamed "Ino-senpai", who becomes the new club president after Mari steps down. She has a crush on Ibe.
Mikage Sakurai (桜井 美景, Sakurai Mikage)
red hair, red eyes
Voiced by: Nao Tōyama (Japanese); Terri Doty (English)
Vice-president of the earth sciences club before graduation and former president of the geology club, nicknamed "Sakura".
Mari Morino (森野 真理, Morino Mari)
gray hair, brown eyes
Voiced by: Sumire Uesaka (Japanese); Natalie Rose (English)
President of the earth sciences club before graduation and former president of the astronomy club, nicknamed "Monroe-senpai". She aspires to become an astronaut.
Moe Suzuya (鈴矢 萌, Suzuya Moe)
dark violet hair
Voiced by: Reina Ueda (Japanese); Madeleine Morris (English)
Mira's childhood friend, known as Suzu for short. She is particularly fond of girls and has a crush on Misa. Her family owns a bakery.
Yuki Endō (遠藤 幸, Endō Yuki)
brown hair, brown eyes
Voiced by: Lynn (Japanese); Megan Shipman (English)
Advisor for the earth sciences club.
Yuu Nanami (七海 悠, Nanami Yuu)
green hair, blue eyes
Voiced by: Sumire Morohoshi (Japanese); Kristen McGuire (English)
A girl who joins the club in Mira's second year, nicknamed "Nana". She wishes to pursue meteorology to help others after seeing her aunt suffer from flood damage.
Chikage Sakurai (桜井 千景, Sakurai Chikage)
red hair, red eyes
Voiced by: Konomi Kohara (Japanese); Apphia Yu (English)
Mikage's younger sister, nicknamed Chika, who joins the club after Mikage graduates. She shares her sister's enthusiasm for geology.
Misa Konohata (木ノ幡 みさ, Konohata Misa)
purple hair, gradient violet-to-yellow eyes
Voiced by: Mai Fuchigami (Japanese); Dani Chambers (English)
Mira's older sister who is student council president until she graduates.
Megu Suzuya (鈴矢 芽, Suzuya Megu)
blue hair, blue eyes
Voiced by: Natsu Yorita (Japanese); Corey Pettit (English)
Suzu's younger sister.
Sayuri Ibe (伊部 小百合, Ibe Sayuri)
green hair, brown eyes
Voiced by: Aoi Koga (Japanese); Sarah Wiedenheft (English)
President of the newspaper club and Mai's friend, who prefers to be called "Eve".
Ayano Usami (宇佐美 綾乃, Usami Ayano)
brown hair, red eyes
Voiced by: Megumi Nakajima (Japanese); Dawn M. Bennett (English)
Newspaper club member and Ao's classmate.

== Media ==
=== Manga ===
Written and illustrated by Quro, Asteroid in Love was serialized in Houbunsha's Manga Time Kirara Carat magazine from January 28, 2017, to June 28, 2024. Its chapters have been collected into six tankōbon volumes.

No.	Release date	ISBN
1	March 27, 2018	978-4-8322-4936-3
2	May 27, 2019	978-4-8322-7095-4
3	February 27, 2020	978-4-8322-7167-8
4	May 27, 2021	978-4-8322-7277-4
5	January 26, 2023	978-4-8322-7433-4
6	August 27, 2024	978-4-8322-9568-1

=== Anime ===
An anime television series adaptation was announced in the April issue of Manga Time Kirara Carat on February 28, 2019. The series was animated by Doga Kobo and directed by Daisuke Hiramaki, with Yuka Yamada handling series composition, and Jun Yamazaki designing the characters. Takurō Iga composed the series' music. It aired from January 3 to March 27, 2020, on AT-X, Tokyo MX, SUN, KBS, TVA, and BS11. Nao Tōyama performed the series' opening theme song "Aruiteikō!" (歩いていこう！; "Let's Walk There!"), while Minori Suzuki performed the series' ending theme song "Yozora" (夜空; "Night Sky"). It ran for 12 episodes. Crunchyroll simulcasted the series with English subtitles, while Funimation began streaming an English dub on March 6, 2020.

No.	Title (Note: All English titles are taken from Crunchyroll.)	Original release date
1	"Their Promise"; Transliteration: "Futari no Yakusoku" (Japanese: 二人の約束)	January 3, 2020
A long time ago, Mira Konohata befriends a boy and makes a promise to discover an asteroid together. Upon entering high school, Mira discovers that the astronomy club has been merged with the geology club to form the earth sciences club. Upon checking the club out and meeting its members, Mira reunites with the boy she met back, Ao Manaka, who is revealed to be a girl. As Mira and Ao struggle to talk to each other in the same way they used to, Ao gets some advice from Mira's friend Moe "Suzu" Suzuya, helping them to have a discussion about Mercury later that night. With the club needing activities to increase their budget, Mai Inose suggests that they produce a newsletter that covers both astronomy and geology.
2	"The Riverside Milky Way"; Transliteration: "Kawara no Amanogawa" (Japanese: 河原の天の川)	January 10, 2020
The club goes to a riverside barbeque to collect various types of rock before looking at planets through a telescope, managing to catch a glimpse at a shooting star. Later, as Mira struggles to think of an article for the newsletter, a suggestion from Ao gives her the idea to turn her article into a manga. After a successful first issue, the girls go to a hot spring spa to celebrate.
3	"Memories Are Treasures"; Transliteration: "Omoide wa Takaramono" (Japanese: 思い出はたからもの)	January 17, 2020
Ao comes over to Mira's house to study for a make-up test, where she is introduced to Mira's sister, Misa, after which Mira and Ao work part-time at Suzu's bakery, where they are helped out by Suzu's younger sister Megu. Later, Mira and Ao come across fellow club member Mai Inose as she and Suzu partake in her hobby of following maps. Inose draws up a treasure map for Mira, Ao, and Suzu to follow, taking them through some of the school's landmarks.
4	"Exciting! Summer Camp!"; Transliteration: "Wakuwaku! Natsu Gasshuku!" (Japanese: わくわく！ 夏合宿!)	January 24, 2020
For the Earth Science club's summer camp, club advisor Yuki Endō takes everyone to her grandmother's place, within spitting distance of several geological and astronomical highlights. The girls first visit the geological museum, where Mira brings what she believes to be a fossil she found during the barbeque to be appraised. She learns that what she found, despite initially appearing to just be a dendrite, does contain a few tiny elements that make it a genuine fossil. The next day, the gang tour the JAXA Space Center, where Mira and Ao try to find clues on how to discover an asteroid, after which they look at some stars and learn about a contest that they just missed the deadline for. For the final day, the girls take Mai to a map museum, where Yuki reflects on her past fascination with space.
5	"Everyone's Summer Break"; Transliteration: "Sorezore no Natsuyasumi" (Japanese: それぞれの夏休み)	January 31, 2020
The girls go to the beach together, where Suzu gets jealous of Ao being so close to Mira and challenges her to a contest to determine who is her best friend. The next day, Mira goes to a mineral show with club vice-president Mikage Sakurai, who has worries about what kind of goal she should have for the future. Later, the girls meet the newspaper club's Sayuri Ibe and Ayano Usami, who end up helping them decide to do an earth science café for the culture festival.
6	"Hoshizaki Festival!"; Transliteration: "Hoshizaki-sai!" (Japanese: 星咲祭!)	February 7, 2020
Thanks to help provided by the newspaper club, Mikage and Mai manage to bore a core sample from the school grounds for the culture festival. Meanwhile, Mira and Ao work on props with club president Mari Morino, learning how she got her interest in astronomy from her grandmother. On the day of the culture festival, the earth science club's café proves to be a decent hint with the customers. After the festival ends, Mari and Mikage announced that they are stepping down as president and vice-president, declaring Mai as the next club president.
6.5	"Sparkle's Special Issue"; Transliteration: "KiraKira Tokubetsu-gō" (Japanese: KiraKira特別号)	February 14, 2020
Recap episode.
7	"The Starry Sky is a Time Machine"; Transliteration: "Hoshizora wa Taimu Mashin" (Japanese: 星空はタイムマシン)	February 21, 2020
The earth sciences club is tasked with helping out at a children's stargazing event, the club's first task with Mai as president. As Suzu and Megu help the others get the kids under control, one girl named Haruka seems disinterested until Ao tells her about how the stars represent the history of the universe. The next day, Ao comes down with a cold, so Mira and Mai come over to visit her. Later, as Mari and Mikage are focused on their exams, Mai decides to take initiative and apply for a competition.
8	"Winter Diamond"; Transliteration: "Fuyu no Daiyamondo" (Japanese: 冬のダイヤモンド)	February 28, 2020
Mai tries out for the Earth Science Olympiad where she befriends another examinee named Saeki, feeling happy despite failing the test. Later, the club hold a Christmas party, where Mari and Mikage give the others a photo album of their time together. During a shrine visit on New Year's Day, Ao reveals that she is scheduled to move away with her father in March due to his work. As the club try to come up with ideas on how Ao and Mira can continue their dream, Misa, who is moving out of her room when she graduates, proposes that Ao try to convince her parents to let her live with Mira.
9	"True Feelings"; Transliteration: "Hontō no Kimochi" (Japanese: 本当の気持ち)	March 6, 2020
With the support of their friends, Ao and Mira successfully convince their parents to let them live together. Later, Mikage asks Suzu to help her make Valentine's chocolates for everyone in the club, encouraging her to give her own chocolates to Misa. On graduation day, the club members give Mikage and Mari some graduation gifts, with the latter later realizing how much she actually enjoyed the club. As Ao moves into the Konohata household over spring break, she argues with Mira after she goes through her luggage, but they quickly make up with each other.
10	"Rain With Occasional Fortune Telling"; Transliteration: "Ame Tokidoki Uranai" (Japanese: 雨ときどき占い)	March 13, 2020
As a new school year begins, the earth sciences club immediately gets two new members, Yuu Nanami and Mikage's younger sister Chikage, the former of which wishes to pursue meteorology. The club plans to hold another barbecue for the new members, although the day is hampered by rain. Yuu reveals that she wants to study meteorology to help others after her aunt suffered from flood damage. When the rain stops, however, Yuu manages to calm down at the sight of a rainbow. Later, Mira manages to get into the Shining Star Challenge contest that they missed last year, but Ao fails, leaving Mira to go to Okinawa alone. When she and Yuki arrive there, however, they discover that Ao has followed after them.
11	"Shining Star Challenge!"; Transliteration: "Kiraboshi Charenji!" (Japanese: きら星チャレンジ!)	March 20, 2020
Yuki manages to convince the event organizer to let Ao observe while Mira makes friends with fellow participants Asuka Tomori and Shiho Makita. Back home, Mikage and Mari chaperone the remaining club members on another summer camp to the JAXA center. As cloudy weather puts a damper on the group's observation of asteroids, they hear about Yuki's time taking part in the Shining Star Challenge, where she was influenced by another participant, Mishima. The next day, the weather clears up, strengthening Mira and Ao's determination to find an asteroid.
12	"Connected Cosmos"; Transliteration: "Tsunagaru Uchū" (Japanese: つながる宇宙)	March 27, 2020
While watching the stars, Mira and Ao discuss what dreams they'll pursue when they've achieve their current one. In the second round of asteroid photography, Ao spots something moving which ultimately turns out to be a known asteroid. Despite this, Mira and Ao still feel they have gained a lot from the experience and become more motivated to achieve their goals. Upon returning home, the two share their experiences with the other club members and spend the evening stargazing together.

=== Video game ===
Characters from the series appear alongside other Manga Time Kirara characters in the 2020 mobile RPG, Kirara Fantasia.

== Reception ==
Faye Hopper of Anime News Network noted that the show has "fundamental cuteness" but criticized it for not having enough to sustain all the episodes. She further stated that Ao and Mira are "in the same position" at the end of the series as they were at the beginning, describing the connections between Ao and Mira as shallow. She specifically noted that the viewers "never understand how much Ao and Mira matter to each other," saying it never digs deep into the relationships between characters.

== Impact ==
The amateur asteroid search project COIAS (a backronym for "Come On! Impacting ASteroids") is named after the manga Koisuru Asteroid (abbreviated KoiAs). Its first numbered discovery, 697402 Ao, is named after the character Ao Manaka. Other COIAS discoveries have been named Quro after the manga artist and Hoshizaki after the school where the manga is set.
