= Only Serious About You =

Japanese manga series

それなりに真剣なんです。 (Sorenari ni Shinken nandesu.)
- Genre: Yaoi
- Manga
- Written by: Kai Asou
- Published by: Houbunsha
- English publisher: Digital Manga Publishing
- Published: 29 May 2010
- Volumes: 2

Only Serious About You (それなりに真剣なんです。, Sorenari ni Shinken nandesu.) is a yaoi manga series by Kai Asou.

== Reception ==
The manga received a positive review by Rebecca Silverman in Anime News Network.
