= Yuka Ozaki =

Japanese voice actress

- 尾崎 由香
- Born: 15 May 1993 (age 33); Tokyo, Japan
- Occupations: Actress; voice actress; singer
- Years active: 2015–present
- Agent: Ken-On
- Height: 150 cm (4 ft 11 in)

Yuka Ozaki (尾崎 由香, Ozaki Yuka; born 15 May 1993) is a Japanese actress and singer. She is currently affiliated with Ken-On.

== Biography ==
Ozaki was born in Tokyo. She was photographed to appear in brochures before the age of one.

Ozaki became a child actress in the third grade of elementary school both on the stage and in television On April 21, 2015, she transferred to Hibiki, together with Rimi Nishimoto.

Ozaki's first work as a voice actress was an announcement on the music video of "broadcasting department" at the "Milky Holmes Fall Sports Festival" held on 19 September 2015, and in 2016 she made her anime debut as the main character Ado Sukinanoka in the Luck & Logic corner anime Watashitachi, Luck-Logi-bu! Since then she has appeared in numerous stores including Luck & Logic related store events and beginner workshops.

Ozaka formed AyaYuka with voice actress Ayasa Itō, which is in charge of programs on the Ibaraki Prefecture's official video site IbaKira TV.

In July 2016, she reached the semifinals of Kodansha's Miss iD She was later ranked third by Cheerz, and ranked tenth in Ar-Sha.com, and she will advance to the finals.

In 2017, Ozaki gained her first regular work in a thirty-minute anime as Serval, the leading role in the anime television series Kemono Friends.

On June 1, 2019, she transferred from Hibiki to Ken-On.

On May 14, 2021, it was announced Ozaki tested positive for COVID-19 but has shown no symptoms.

On July 29, 2024, Ozaki announced her marriage to a person with whom she had been in a relationship with.

== Personal life ==
- She is nicknamed Ozapure (おざぴゅあ, Ozapyua) by Sora Tokui.
- Ozaki says that she is curious to express herself with one word.
- She likes ice cream, but dislikes birds.
- Ozaki's special skills is making sweets and being able to eat any spicy food, and her hobbies are watching films, photography, and mountain climbing.
- Her favorite artists are CNBLUE and μ's (the fictional idol band from Love Live!.
- Ozaki thinks that she would not lose to others, and likes staring and Tsutaya.

== Filmography ==
Bold denotes main character.

=== Anime television ===
Year	Title	Role	Ref
2016	Future Card Buddyfight	Child, female student	
2016	Watashitachi, Luck-Logi-bu!	**Ado Sukinanoka**, Selenium Researcher 013	
2017	Watashitachi, Luck-Logi-bu! 2	**Ado Sukinanoka**, Selenium Researcher 013	
2017	Kemono Friends	**Serval**, Common Dolphin	
2017	BanG Dream!	Asuka Toyama	
2017	King's Game The Animation	Aya Matsuoka, herself	
2018	Anima Yell!	**Kohane Hatoya**	
2018	Shonen Ashibe GO! GO! Goma-chan Season 3	Mumei, Ruriko, Photo-chan	
2018	BanG Dream! Girls Band Party! ☆ Pico	Asuka Toyama	
2019	BanG Dream! 2nd Season	Asuka Toyama	
2019	Kemono Friends 2	**Serval**, Common Dolphin	
2019	Bermuda Triangle Colorful Pastrale	Irina	
2019	Shonen Ashibe GO! GO! Goma-chan Season 4	Makoto, Girl, Photo-chan	
2020	Magia Record	Ren Izusu (Ep.2)	
2020	BanG Dream! 3rd Season	Asuka Toyama	
2020	BanG Dream! Girls Band Party! ☆ Pico ~Ohmori~	Asuka Toyama	
2020	Rebirth for you	**Ikumi Okazaki**	
2021	Sonny Boy	Kossetsu	
2022	Black Summoner	Leonhardt Gown, Elf Child	
2023	Otaku Elf	**Koito Koganei**	
2023	BanG Dream! It's MyGO!!!!!	Asuka Toyama	
2023	Ayaka: A Story of Bonds and Wounds	Fire Dragon	
2023	Bōkensha ni Naritai to Miyako ni Deteitta Musume ga S-rank ni Natteta	Anonymus	
2024	Rinkai!	Sora Iwakitaira	
2025	Momentary Lily	Nerine	
2025	The Daily Life of a Middle-aged Online Shopper in Another world	Receptionist	

=== Video games ===
Year	Title	Role
	Trickster –Shōkan Samurai ni naritai–	Lotte
	Megami meguri	Amateras
	Shōjo Kageki Revue Starlight -Re LIVE-	Michiru Otori
2017	Magia Record: Puella Magi Madoka Magica Side Story	Ren Isuzu
2019	Da Capo 4	Chiyoko Hinohara
2019	Dragon Quest XI S : Echoes of an Elusive Age - Definitive Edition	Healijah
2025	Puella Magi Madoka Magica: Magia Exedra	Ren Isuzu

=== TV programs ===
Year	Title	Network	Notes
2016	Monthly Bushiroad	Tokyo MX	Ozapyua Tenkeyohō Corner
2017	Music Station	TV Asahi	As part of Dōbutsu Biscuits × PPP

=== Internet TV ===
Year	Title	Network	Notes	Ref.
	Suiroji!	Niconico Live Broadcast	Wednesdays; main MC	
	Getsuroji!	Niconico Live Broadcast	Mondays; main MC	
2016	AyaYuka no Pekopeko Ibaraki	InbaKira	(Note: Ibaraki Prefecture's official internet video site)	

=== Radio ===
Bold denotes that the program is still being broadcast. ※Internet webcasts.

Year	Title	Network
2016	**Megami meguri no Radio meguri**	HiBiKi Radio Station
2016	**Kemono Friends Radio!!**	HiBiKi Radio Station

=== Narration ===
Year	Title	Network	Location	Notes
2015	Live Milky Holmes Aki no Dai Undōkai		Makuhari Messe Event Hall	PV, in-place announcement
2015	Project TCG Sekaiichi e no Chōsen! –Luck & Logic–		MXTV	
2016	Gekkan Bushiroad TV		MXTV	Monthly Bushi News Corner, As Yuka of AyaYuka
2017	Oshaberi Ojisan to Okoreru Onna		TV Tokyo	Narration

=== Music CD ===
Date	Title	As	Song	Tie-up
2016
21 Dec	Megami Meguri	Tsukumo (Ayasa Itō), Amateras Omikami (Ozaki), Ameno Usume (Mikoi Sasaki), Sotoorihime (Sae Otsuka), Kukuhime (Ayaka Imamura), Konohana Sakuyahime (Aina Suzuki), Toyota Mahime (Reina Ueda), Ishikolidme (Asuka Ōgame), Amenosagome (Haruka Chisuga)	"Fi Fi High Tension!"	Video game Megami Meguri related song
2017
8 Feb	Megami Meguri character song Koko kara no Start / I'm Sunshine Girl	Amateras Omikami (Ozaki)	"I'm Sunshine Girl"	Video game Megami Meguri related song
8 Feb	Yōkoso Japari Park e	Dōbutsu Biscuits (Note: Raccoon (Saki Ono), Serval (Ozaki), Fennec (Kana Motomiya)) × PPP (Note: Rockhopper penguin (Aina Aiba), Humboldt penguin (Ikuko Chikuta), Royal penguin (Mikoi Sasaki), Emperor penguin (Ruka Nemoto), Gentoo penguin (Kyōka Tamura))	"Yōkoso Japari Park e"	anime television series Kemono Friends opening theme
		2019		
27 Feb	Platinum Forte	Yukishiro Akira (Nomoto Hotaru), Otori Michiru (Ozaki Yuka), Liu Meifan (Takeuchi Yume), Tsuruhime Yachiyo (Kudou Haruka), Yumeoji Shiori (Toono Hikaru)	"Platinum Forte", "Discovery! (Siegfeld Music Institute Vers.)"	Shōjo Kageki Revue Starlight -Re LIVE- insert song. Siegfeld Music Institute 1st single.

=== Other contents ===
Title
Miss iD 2017 finalist
