= Mao (manga) =

Japanese manga series by Rumiko Takahashi

- First tankōbon volume cover, featuring the titular character
- Genre: Dark fantasy; Mystery; Supernatural
- Manga
- Written by: Rumiko Takahashi
- Published by: Shogakukan
- English publisher: NA: Viz Media
- Imprint: Shōnen Sunday Comics
- Magazine: Weekly Shōnen Sunday
- Original run: May 8, 2019 – present
- Volumes: 31
- Anime television series
- Directed by: Teruo Satō
- Written by: Yūko Kakihara
- Music by: Shū Kanematsu
- Studio: Sunrise
- Licensed by: NA/AU/NZ: Viz Media; SA/SEA: Medialink
- Original network: NHK General TV
- Original run: April 4, 2026 – September 26, 2026
- Episodes: 26
- icon

Mao (stylized in all caps) is a Japanese manga series written and illustrated by Rumiko Takahashi. It has been serialized in Shogakukan's Weekly Shōnen Sunday magazine since May 2019, with its chapters collected in 31 tankōbon volumes as of October 2026. In North America, the series is licensed for English release by Viz Media. An anime television series adaptation produced by Sunrise aired on NHK General TV from April to September 2026.

== Plot ==
Eight years ago, Nanoka Kiba was saved from the wreckage of a fatal accident at Gogyo Shopping Center. Drawn to the abandoned passage of storefronts on her walk home from school in present day, she becomes inexplicably transported to Japan's Taisho era where she meets the mysterious Mao, a fellow traveler whose arrival at a ghost-inhabited village is simultaneous with hers. Together, they investigate the bizarre events that begin to occur around them, and Nanoka soon pieces together her broken memories of the accident and how she and Mao may have something more sinister in common.

== Characters ==
=== Main characters ===
Mao (摩緒)
Voiced by: Yuki Kaji (PV, anime) (Japanese); Howard Wang (English)
The wielder of a deadly longsword, Hagunsei (破軍星), Mao is a man cursed in many ways. Known as an onmyoji, he searches for the whereabouts of the byoki, a powerful kodoku created from a terrifying ritual. He is also able to lend some of his blood to Nanoka as they share byoki blood. Mao sees himself as sort of a guardian to Nanoka. He is one of the Goko clan manor disciples from 900 years ago and lives as a doctor in the Taisho era.
Nanoka Kiba (黄葉 菜花, Kiba Nanoka)
Voiced by: Natsumi Kawaida (anime) (Japanese); Anjali Kunapaneni (English)
A plucky third-year middle school student. She died when she was eight years old, but miraculously still lives on. Now fifteen, she uses an abandoned shopping district passage to travel to the Taisho era and investigate mysterious killings, cults, and disappearances with Mao. Like Mao, she is also cursed by the byoki and can therefore wield the Hagunsei and lend some of her blood to Mao. She currently wields the Akanemaru (地血丸), a sword that sucks blood from its wielder. She eventually develops a crush on Mao.
Otoya (乙弥)
Voiced by: Momoka Terasawa (Japanese); Jackie Lastra (English)
A shikigami with the appearance of a young boy who works as Mao's assistant. He has a very rational personality and carries Mao's tools for him. He is also in charge of maintaining the kodoku jar that Mao uses to heal.
Byoki (猫鬼, Byōki)
Voiced by: Takashi Matsuyama (Japanese); Patrick Seitz (English)
A demon with similar appearance to the cat once known as Haimaru (灰丸), who cursed Mao and Nanoka to be its unwilling vessels. Allying itself neither with Mao or the new Goko clan, Byoki has its own mysterious goals.

=== Heian Era Goko Clan ===
Master (師匠, Shishō)
Voiced by: Masaki Terasoma (Japanese); Cory Yee (English)
The head of the Goko clan (御降家, Gokō-ke) in the Heian period and the father of Sana and Yurako. After Mao became his favorite disciple, he chose to name him as the successor to the clan. In secret, he ordered five other disciples to kill Mao to become the true successor, aiming to draw out the strongest of them. He was killed when the clan fell, supposedly by Mao himself.
Hyakka (百火)
Voiced by: Hiro Shimono (PV, anime) (Japanese); Edward M. Mendoza (English)
A fire element user who was on friendly terms with Mao when they lived at the Goko clan Manor in the Heian period. He is technically Mao's superior, having joined the Goko clan ten days before. He was the only person who was summoned to the Five-Sided Shrine that spoke up against killing Mao. However, he was led to believe that Mao had killed Sana when the clan fell and had distrusted him since. He spent much of his time as an immortal working as a carnival performer and ramen cook.
Kamon (華紋)
Voiced by: Toshiyuki Toyonaga (PV, anime) (Japanese); Brian Timothy Anderson (English)
A wood element user who occasionally joins forces with Mao when it is convenient for him. He was a member of the Goko clan in the Heian period, where he created the Seeds of Haku. Having become immortal, in the Taisho period he is known as Kuchinawa (朽縄). He wishes to investigate the fate of his late lover Masago. He has a shikigami named Beniko (紅子) who serves as his assistant.
Masago (真砂)
Voiced by: Emiri Suyama (Japanese); Cristina Vee (English)
A kind and powerful water element user who was a disciple of the Goko clan in the Heian era. Disliking violence, she often felt conflicted about her position in the clan. She was secretly Kamon's lover, but died while trying to run away from the Goko clan. Her body was captured and preserved by Shiranui, who continues to absorb her power.
Shiranui (不知火)
Voiced by: Kazuyuki Okitsu (Japanese); Landon McDonald (English)
A water element user from the Goko clan with an obsessive interest in Mao. He suffered great amounts of abuse from the clan's master due to being less skilled than his peers, coming to resent them. After becoming immortal when the Goko clan fell he continuously attacked the surviving members throughout the centuries. He runs the new Goko clan in the Taisho era with Hakubi and Yurako, where he continues to carry out assassinations for clients.
Hakubi (白眉)
Voiced by: Takuya Satō
A cunning metal element user and disciple of the Goko clan Manor. He previously fought in the Russo-Japanese War under the name Captain Shirasu (白洲), where he had an encounter with Hyakka. He holds a grudge against Hyakka for slicing off his arm and burning his face. He has an old alliance with Yurako, and they plan to resurrect the Goko clan together.
Daigo (大五)
Voiced by: Katsuyuki Konishi
An orphan and older brother figure to Mao. After leaving the orphanage where they were both raised, he recommends Mao to join the Goko clan as he did. During his time at the manor, he grew to be one of the best earth element users. He was in love with Sana and planned to escape the Goko clan with her but was killed during the succession war.
Natsuno (夏野)
Voiced by: Rie Kugimiya
A laid-back earth element user and former disciple of the Goko clan who previously worked with Daigo. At one time terminally ill, she made a pact with a clay golem that saved her life and made her immortal in exchange for finding a collection of dismembered body parts. After proving her loyalty to Mao in the Taisho era, she occasionally helps him while also training Nanoka to use earth energy with Akanemaru. The last body part she needs to find is a right hand.
Sana (紗那)
Voiced by: Risa Shimizu (Japanese); Xanthe Huynh (English)
The daughter of the Goko clan Master, Sana was betrothed to Mao when he was named the successor. She was secretly in love with Daigo, and planned on escaping the manor together before he was killed. She had a pet cat named Haimaru (灰丸), who would later turn into Byoki. She was killed when the Goko clan fell, with the survivors believing she was murdered by Mao. A woman in the Taisho era named Yurako shares her appearance.
Yurako (幽羅子)
Voiced by: Reina Ueda (Japanese); Anairis Quiñones (English)
She is originally believed to be Sana in the Taisho era, appearing identical to her. Yurako eventually reveals to Nanoka that she is Sana's twin sister. Unlike Sana who lived in the Goko Clan manor, Yurako was confined to a cave and forced to become a vessel for the curses that were directed at the clan, her body becoming filled with ayakashi. Becoming extremely bitter of her sister, she falls in love with Mao when he showed her kindness after escaping. After becoming immortal, she currently works with Shiranui and Hakubi in order to revive the Goko clan.

=== Taisho Era Goko Clan ===
Soma Kagami (加神 双馬, Kagami Sōma)
Voiced by: Tasuku Kaito
Soma comes from a family that has passed down a sacred scroll for generations, which gives the eldest son the power to control a powerful beast. Soma obtains the beast after his older brother Ichima (一馬) is killed by it. He is taken in and mentored by Hakubi, who uses the beast's ability to perform assassinations for the new Goko clan. He has two younger brothers named Mitsuma (三馬) and Shizuma (四津馬).
Kagari Hosho (宝生 かがり, Hōshō Kagari)
Voiced by: Shino Shimoji
Kagari is a high school girl from the Taisho era who is able to cast metal curses through needles. Her family runs a business casting curse commissions and is in possession of a Goko clan artifact known as the puppet needle. Hakubi tracks down the puppet needle and recruits her into the new Goko clan, where she carries out curses for him in order to gain his approval. She is jealous of her older sister Ayame, who is more skilled than her.
Renji (蓮次)
Renji, known by the alias Okuribi no Renji (送り火の蓮次), is an assassin from the Taisho era who is able to control lethal fireflies with his yueqin (月琴). Abused by his parents who routinely adopted children and then sold them to human traffickers. He was only shown kindness by his sister Tsuyu, who died protecting him. In vengeance, he burnt down his parents home and began assassinating the people who had trafficked his siblings. Because of his past, he sympathizes with prostitutes and often visits them in order to give money. He works under Shiranui to carry out assassinations for the new Goko clan.
Mei Mitazono (御手園 芽生, Mitazono Mei)
Mei works as a doctor for the new Goko clan and tends to Shiranui's Garden of Longevity (延命の庭). She is skilled in wood magic and is able to heal people with the Seeds of Haku, though they will eventually consume the host with vines. Born to a foreign father and a Japanese mother, Mei's hometown was polluted when a group of yakuza built a factory downstream. Her father was killed after attempting to stand up to them, with Mei escaping but suffering grave injuries. Shiranui saved her by implanting a Seed of Haku, and as such she feels indebted to him. She chooses to spend the remainder of her life serving the Goko clan and getting revenge on her father's murderers.
Sasuga (流石)
Sasuga is a young boy who is able to manipulate water with his conch shell. He uses his powers to cause droughts in villages, then offering his services to summon rain for a price. Supposedly a distant descendant of a Goko clan member, he joins forces with Shiranui after meeting Mei.

=== Other characters ===
Funa Uozumi (魚住 フナ, Uozumi Funa)
Voiced by: Motoko Kumai (Japanese); Dorah Fine (English)
A shikigami sent by Mao to look after Nanoka in the modern era. She creates the "disgusting" shakes that suppress Nanoka's byoki energy.
Shiraha (白羽)
Voiced by: Ryuho Nagaoka (Japanese); Paul Castro Jr. (English)
A classmate of Nanoka in the modern era. He is skilled at researching on Wikipedia and other databases, helping Nanoka learn more about the history that she visits. He harbors an unrequited crush on her.
Tenko (貂子)
Voiced by: Yoko Hikasa (Japanese); Risa Mei (English)
A friend of Mao's who works at the cafe Milk Hall. Through a network of connections, she is able to provide him with the latest gossip and news of mysterious incidents in the Taisho period. She is secretly an ayakashi.
Ayame Hosho (宝生 綾女, Hōshō Ayame)
Kagari's older sister who is more skilled at curses than her. Ayame would receive more curse commissions for the family business, leading Kagari to become extremely jealous of her. After being blinded in her left eye by one of Kagari's needles, she gains the ability to sense the path a person will take.

== Media ==
=== Manga ===
Written and illustrated by Rumiko Takahashi, Mao was announced in Shogakukan's Weekly Shōnen Sunday in December 2018. The manga started serialization in Weekly Shōnen Sunday on May 8, 2019. Shogakukan has collected the manga chapters into individual tankōbon volumes. The first volume was published on September 18, 2019. As of October 16, 2026, 31 volumes have been released.

In February 2021, Viz Media announced that it had licensed the manga for an English release in North America, and the first volume was published on September 14, 2021. On May 9, 2023, Viz Media launched their Viz Manga digital manga service, with the series' chapters receiving simultaneous English publication in North America as they are released in Japan.

=== Anime ===
In July 2025, it was announced that the manga would be receiving an anime television series adaptation produced by Sunrise. The series was directed by Teruo Satō, with series composition by Yūko Kakihara, character designs and chief animation direction by Yoshihito Hishinuma, and music composed by Shū Kanematsu. The series aired from April 4 to September 26, 2026, on NHK General TV. The first opening theme song is "Heartloud", performed by Kis-My-Ft2, while the first ending theme song is "Juai" (呪愛; lit. 'Cursed Love'), performed by True. The second opening theme song is "Bokura ga Uwagaki suru Sekai" (僕らが上書きする世界; lit. 'The World We Overwrite'), performed by 20th Century, while the second ending theme song is "Tayutau" (揺蕩う; lit. 'Swaying'), performed by Reina Ueda.

Viz Media licensed the series and is streaming it on Hulu in the United States, and Disney+ in Canada, Australia, New Zealand, and Latin America. An English dub produced by Bang Zoom! Studios premiered with the first cours on August 24, 2026. The dub's second cours is set to premiere in November of the same year. Medialink licensed the series in South and Southeast Asia.

==== Episodes ====
No.	Title	Directed by (Note: Production staff information is taken from the ending credits of each episode.)	Written by	Storyboarded by	Animation directed by	Original release date
1	"Nanoka and Mao"; Transliteration: "Nanoka to Mao" (Japanese: 菜花と摩緒)	Teruo Satō	Yūko Kakihara	Teruo Satō	Shinichi Wada, Kumi Ishii & Kazuhisa Kosuge	April 4, 2026
2	"Spider Lady"; Transliteration: "Kumo Onna" (Japanese: 蜘蛛女)	Yohei Shindo	Mitsutaka Hirota	Teruo Satō	Hirotoshi Takaya & Atsuo Tobe	April 11, 2026
3	"The Accursed"; Transliteration: "Norowareshi Mono" (Japanese: 呪われし者)	Mitsuhiro Yoneda & Kenichi Domon	Hiroko Kanasugi	Teruo Satō	Miyuki Katayama, Hiromi Maezawa & Yumenosuke Tokuda	April 18, 2026
4	"The Shorinkyo Incident"; Transliteration: "Shōrinkyō Jiken" (Japanese: 鐘臨教事件)	Madoka Yaguchi	Yūko Kakihara	Teruo Satō	Eriko Ito, Natsuki Egami, Sakurako Sagano, Takuro Sakurai, Yūki Nagata, Hirokazu Hisayuki & Yōsuke Murata	April 25, 2026
5	"The Keystone"; Transliteration: "Kanameishi" (Japanese: 要石)	Hitoshi Okabe	Mitsutaka Hirota	Atsuo Tobe	Manabu Katayama	May 2, 2026
6	"Memories of That Day"; Transliteration: "Ano Hi no Kioku" (Japanese: あの日の記憶)	Yohei Shindo	Hiroko Kanasugi	Teruo Satō	Kazuhisa Kosuge, Shinichi Wada, Hiromi Okazaki, Miyuki Katayama & Kumi Ishii	May 9, 2026
7	"The New Vessel"; Transliteration: "Atarashii Utsuwa" (Japanese: 新しい器)	Kōsuke Shimotori	Hiroko Kanasugi	Kazutaka Muraki	Hiroki Kishi, Aoi Hamahira, Yuka Hayashi, Falco Suzuki, Kazuhisa Kosuge & Hiromi Maezawa	May 16, 2026
8	"Hyakka" (Japanese: 百火)	Ryōtarō Aoba	Mitsutaka Hirota	Hiromitsu Kanazawa	Ryōtarō Aoba, Mari Umezawa, Shinichi Wada, Kazuhisa Kosuge, Kumi Ishii & Hiromi Maezawa	May 23, 2026
9	"Kamon" (Japanese: 華紋)	Mitsuhiro Yoneda	Yūko Kakihara	Mitsuhiro Yoneda	Miyuki Katayama, Hiromi Maezawa, Hideyuki Usutani & Kumi Ishii	May 30, 2026
10	"Taizanfukun" (Japanese: 泰山府君)	Yohei Shindo	Hiroko Kanasugi	Yoshiyuki Kaneko	N/A	June 6, 2026
11	"Blood Bond"; Transliteration: "Chi no Majiwari" (Japanese: 血の交わり)	Takashi Mamezuka	Mitsutaka Hirota	Teruo Satō	Hirotoshi Takaya	June 13, 2026
12	"Water Sorcerer"; Transliteration: "Mizu no Jutsusha" (Japanese: 水の術者)	Kōsuke Shimotori	Hiroko Kanasugi	Sakura Kawai	Miyuki Katayama, Hideyuki Usutani & Hiromi Maezawa	June 20, 2026
13	"Byoki" (Japanese: 猫鬼)	Ryōsuke Tanaka	Yūko Kakihara	Sakura Kawai	Hiroki Kishi, Maho Toyoshima, Falco Suzuki, Yuka Hayashi, Jun'ichirō; Saitō, Yūki Iwai, Han Lu Feng, Shinichi Wada & Lu Laforte	June 27, 2026
14	"The Iron Mask"; Transliteration: "Tekkamen" (Japanese: 鉄仮面)	Satoshi Toba	Mitsutaka Hirota	Teruo Satō	Manabu Katayama, Naoko Yamamoto, Shūji Sakamoto & Shinichi Wada	July 4, 2026
15	"Shiranui" (Japanese: 不知火)	Mitsuhiro Yoneda & Kenichi Domon	Hiroko Kanasugi	Mitsuhiro Yoneda	Hideyuki Usutani, Hiromi Maezawa, Kumi Ishii & Hiromi Okazaki	July 18, 2026
16	"Hakubi" (Japanese: 白眉)	Katsuya Yamamoto	Yūko Kakihara	Hiromitsu Kanazawa	Atsuo Tobe & Hirotoshi Takaya	July 19, 2026
17	"Maogui" (Japanese: マオグイ)	Marie Tagashira	Hiroko Kanasugi	Marie Tagashira	Jun Shibata, Yasuhiro Ueno, Naoko Yamamoto, Manabu Katayama & Kaoru Maehara	July 25, 2026
18	"Natsuno" (Japanese: 夏野)	Satoshi Toba	Mitsutaka Hirota	Sakura Kawai	Rin Riku, Hideyuki Usutani, Hiromi Maezawa & Hiromi Okazaki	August 1, 2026
19	"The Undersea Shrine"; Transliteration: "Kaitei no Yashiro" (Japanese: 海底の社)	Mitsuhiro Yoneda	Yūko Kakihara	Naoya Andō	Kazuhisa Kosuge, Shinichi Wada & Kumi Ishii	August 8, 2026
20	"Sana's Heart"; Transliteration: "Sana no Shinzō" (Japanese: 紗那の心臓)	Yūji Kumazawa	Yūko Kakihara	Hiromitsu Kanazawa	Hirotoshi Takaya, Hiromi Maezawa, Miyuki Katayama, Tsutomu Ōno & Hideyuki Usutani	August 15, 2026
21	"Soma" (Japanese: 双馬)	Kenichi Domon & Mitsuhiro Yoneda	Mitsutaka Hirota	Ka-Hee Im	Rin Riku, Shinichi Wada, Jun Shibata, Yasuhiro Ueno, Yurika Sako, Naoko Yamamoto, Kazuhisa Kosuge, Miki Takihara, Asuka Watanabe & Min-Ho Jang	August 22, 2026
22	"Risk My Life"; Transliteration: "Sutemi" (Japanese: 捨て身)	Teruo Satō	Mitsutaka Hirota	Sakura Kawai	Atsuo Tobe, Manabu Katayama, Hiromi Maezawa & Naoko Yamamoto	August 29, 2026
23	"The Sleepwalking Patient"; Transliteration: "Yoru-Aruku Kanja" (Japanese: 夜歩く患者)	Katsuya Yamamoto	Hiroko Kanasugi	Sakura Kawai	Rin Riku, Kumi Ishii, Hiyori Tsunesada, Kumiko Shishido, Hideyuki Usutani, Kazuhisa Kosuge & Kenichi Takase	September 5, 2026
24	"Traveling Performers"; Transliteration: "Murashibai no Ichiza" (Japanese: 村芝居の一座)	Mitsuhiro Yoneda & Kenichi Domon	Hiroko Kanasugi	Mitsuhiro Yoneda	Hideyuki Usutani, Kazuhisa Kosuge, Yurika Sako, Shūji Maruyama, Jun Shibata, Yasuhiro Ueno, Naoko Yamamoto, Shinichi Wada, Kumiko Shishido & Kenichi Takase	September 12, 2026
25	"Ghouls and Rakshasas"; Transliteration: "Yūki to Rasetsu" (Japanese: 幽鬼と羅刹)	Yūji Kumazawa	Yūko Kakihara	Sakura Kawai	Rin Riku, Shinichi Wada, Hideyuki Usutani, Ryūichi Baba, Kumi Ishii, Asuka Watanabe, Jun Shibata, Yasuhiro Ueno, Naoko Yamamoto, Hiromi Maezawa, Kazuhisa Kosuge, Yurika Sako, Manabu Katayama & Kumiko Shishido	September 19, 2026
26	"Yurako's World"; Transliteration: "Yurako no Sekai" (Japanese: 幽羅子の世界)	Teruo Satō	Yūko Kakihara	Sakura Kawai	Manabu Katayama, Kumi Ishii, Shinichi Wada, Yasuhiro Ueno, Rin Riku, Jun Shibata, Rina Muramatsu, Kazuhisa Kosuge, Hideyuki Usutani & Ryūichi Baba	September 26, 2026

=== Other media ===
A two-part interview between Takahashi and Satoru Noda, author of Golden Kamuy, was published in Weekly Shōnen Sunday and Shueisha's Weekly Young Jump to celebrate the then upcoming first volume of Mao and the new volume of Golden Kamuy in September 2019. A promotional video for the fifth volume release, narrated by Inuyasha's character Sesshomaru (Ken Narita), was posted in August 2020. A promotional video for the sixth volume release, narrated by Inuyasha's characters Inuyasha (Kappei Yamaguchi) and Kagome (Satsuki Yukino), was posted in October 2020. On July 7, 2021, the series reached 100 chapters and a promotional video, featuring Yuki Kaji as Mao (who previously expressed his interest to participate in an eventual anime adaptation of the series), Hiro Shimono as Hyakka and Toshiyuki Toyonaga as Kamon, was posted.

== Reception ==
By July 2021, the manga had 1 million copies in circulation. In December 2019, Brutus magazine listed Mao on their "Most Dangerous Manga" list, which included works with the most "stimulating" and thought-provoking themes. The School Library Journal listed the first volume of Mao as one of the top 10 manga of 2021.

In her review of the first volume, Rebecca Silverman of Anime News Network gave it a grade of B−. Silverman found the series's historical setting and its worldbuilding elements interesting and also praised Takahashi's artwork. However, she criticized the series for its reused story elements and character designs, noting similarities to Takahashi's previous works such as Inuyasha and Rin-ne. Also reviewing the first volume, Nick Smith of ICv2 described Mao as "closest to Inuyasha in style" and, while stating that the series offered nothing new or innovative, praised its story and artwork, adding that it could become another classic series if the story developed further from its starting point.

In 2026, the anime series was nominated at the 6th Astra TV Awards in the Best Anime Series category.
