= RPG Real Estate =

Japanese manga series and its adaptation

- Cover of RPG Real Estate volume 1 by Houbunsha, featuring Kotone Kazairo

RPG不動産 (Āru Pī Jī Fudōsan)
- Genre: Fantasy
- Manga
- Written by: Chiyo Kenmotsu
- Published by: Houbunsha
- Magazine: Manga Time Kirara Carat
- Original run: July 27, 2018 – October 27, 2023
- Volumes: 6
- Anime television series
- Directed by: Tomoaki Koshida
- Written by: Yoshiko Nakamura
- Music by: Makoto Miyazaki
- Studio: Doga Kobo
- Licensed by: Crunchyroll
- Original network: AT-X, Tokyo MX, TVA, KBS, Sun TV, BS NTV
- Original run: April 6, 2022 – June 22, 2022
- Episodes: 12
- icon

RPG Real Estate (RPG不動産, Āru Pī Jī Fudōsan) is a Japanese four-panel manga series by Chiyo Kenmotsu. It was serialized in Houbunsha's seinen manga magazine Manga Time Kirara Carat from July 2018 to October 2023. It has been collected in six tankōbon volumes. An anime television series adaptation produced by Doga Kobo aired from April to June 2022.

== Plot ==
The story begins 15 years after the demon king was defeated. The world has become peaceful. Kotone, who graduated from school and became a magician, inquired the kingdom-affiliated RPG Real Estate in order to find a new home. In reality, RPG Real Estate was Kotone's place of employment, and together with Fa, a demi-human, the priest Rufuria, and the soldier Rakira, they help support the searches of new homes for the customers with various circumstances.

== Characters ==
Kotone Kazairo (風色 琴音, Kazairo Kotone)
Voiced by: Honoka Inoue
The series protagonist, she is a girl with long pink twin-tailed hair. She takes up a job at the titular RPG Real Estate.
Fa (ファー, Fā)
Voiced by: Hina Kino
One of the workers are RPG Real Estate, she has light blue hair and a dragon tail. She is actually a dragon herself and can transform into one.
Rufuria (ルフリア)
Voiced by: Natsumi Kawaida
Rakira (ラキラ)
Voiced by: Manaka Iwami
One of the workers are RPG Real Estate, she has long black twin-tailed hair. When she was young she was often mistaken for a boy due to her short hair, leading to her growing it out as she got older.
Satona (サトナ)
Voiced by: Yoko Hikasa
Seira (セーラ, Sēra)
Voiced by: Minami Takahashi
Mona (モナ)
Voiced by: Honoka Kuroki

== Media ==
=== Manga ===
Written and illustrated by Chiyo Kenmotsu, RPG Real Estate began serialization in Houbunsha's seinen manga magazine Manga Time Kirara Carat on July 27, 2018. The series ended serialization on October 27, 2023.

No.	Release date	ISBN
1	April 25, 2019	978-4-8322-7090-9
2	March 27, 2020	978-4-8322-7180-7
3	April 27, 2021	978-4-8322-7270-5
4	April 27, 2022	978-4-8322-7361-0
5	February 27, 2023	978-4-8322-7420-4
6	November 27, 2023	978-4-8322-9503-2

=== Anime ===
An anime television series adaptation was announced on February 26, 2021. The series is animated by Doga Kobo and directed by Tomoaki Koshida, with screenplays by Yoshiko Nakamura, character designs by Motohiro Taniguchi, and music composed by Makoto Miyazaki. It aired from April 6 to June 22, 2022, on AT-X and other networks. The opening theme song is "Make Up Life!" by Honoka Inoue, Hina Kino, Natsumi Kawaida, and Manaka Iwami, while the ending theme song is "Awesome!" by Maneki Kecak. Crunchyroll has licensed the series.

==== Episodes ====
No.	Title (Note: All English titles are taken from Crunchyroll.)	Directed by	Written by	Storyboarded by	Original release date
1	"Welcome to RPG Real Estate! Room-Searching for the First Time!"; Transliteration: "Āru Pī Jī Fudōsan e Yōkoso! Hajimete no Oheya Sagashi desu!" (Japanese: RPG不動産へようこそ! はじめてのお部屋探しです!)	Tomoaki Koshida	Yoshiko Nakamura	Tomoaki Koshida	April 6, 2022
2	"Troublesome Property! First Business Trip to the Dark Lord's Castle"; Transliteration: "Okomari Bukken! Maōjō ni Hatsu Shutchō desu!" (Japanese: お困り物件! 魔王城に初出張です!)	Matsuo Asami	Yoshiko Nakamura	Masayoshi Nishida	April 13, 2022
3	"For Real! Dragon, Ghost, Overwhelming Magic!?"; Transliteration: "Detan desu......! Doragon to Obake to Sugoi Maryoku!?" (Japanese: 出たんです……! ドラゴンとお化けとすごい魔力!?)	Yūji Nakata	Tomoaki Koshida	Kōji Hōri	April 20, 2022
4	"Always Together! A Property Packed with Pets, Dreams, and Friendship!"; Transliteration: "Zutto Issho! Petto to Yume to Yūjō no, Gyutto Tsumatta Oheya desu!" (Japanese: ずっと一緒! ぺットと夢と友情の、ぎゅっとつまったお部屋です!)	Sekijū Sekino	Yoshiko Nakamura	Sekijū Sekino	April 27, 2022
5	"Summer! We Found a Great House for Wearing Swimsuits!"; Transliteration: "Samā! Mizugi ga Niau Sugoi Yoi Ouchi, Mitsukemashita!" (Japanese: サマー! 水着が似合うすごい良いお家、見つけました!)	Hodaka Kuramoto	Tomoaki Koshida	Hiroaki Yoshikawa; Masayoshi Nishida	May 4, 2022
6	"A Melody for the Grim Reaper!? We're All Friends! Let's Get Along!"; Transliteration: "Shinigami ni Sasageru Merodi!? Tomodachi Damon! Minna Nakayoku desu!" (Japanese: 死神に捧げるメロディ!? 友達だもん! みんな仲良くです!)	Matsuo Asami	Michihiro Tsuchiya	Kōji Hōri	May 11, 2022
7	"Doors, Doors, Doors! Open the Door to Summer Vacation!"; Transliteration: "Doa Doa Doa! Tobira o Aketara, Fā♡ Natsuyasumi e Gō desu!" (Japanese: ドアドアドア! 扉を開けたら、ふぁー♡ 夏休みへGOです!)	Takashi Takeuchi	Yoshiko Nakamura	Shōgo Arai	May 18, 2022
8	"Wha!? Finding a Dream Home through Fortune Telling!?"; Transliteration: "Hoe!? Uranai de Unmei no Heya, Mitsukarimasu ka!?" (Japanese: ほえ!? 占いで運命の部屋、見つかりますか!?)	Hideki Tonokatsu	Michihiro Tsuchiya	Kenji Setō	May 25, 2022
9	"Nyan! One More Deal Until We Meet Our Goal! Let's Make Our Wishes Come True at the Millennium Star Festival!"; Transliteration: "Nya~n! Mokuhyō Tassei made Ato Ikken! Sennen Hoshi Matsuri de Negai Kanae Tamae!" (Japanese: にゃ〜ん! 目標達成まであと一軒! 千年星祭りで願い叶えたまえ!)	Hodaka Kuramoto	Michihiro Tsuchiya	Kōji Hōri	June 1, 2022
10	"Woes of Longevity! I Need a Sturdy House That I Can Live in for a Long Time!"; Transliteration: "Chōju no Onayami! Tonikaku Jōbu de Nagaku Sumeru Ie, Kibō!" (Japanese: 長寿のお悩み! とにかく丈夫で長く住める家、希望!)	Tōru Hamazaki	Yoshiko Nakamura	Masayoshi Nishida	June 8, 2022
11	"Fa, Let's Go Home Together"; Transliteration: "Fā, Issho ni Kaerō" (Japanese: ファー、一緒に帰ろう)	Tatsuya Nokimori	Yoshiko Nakamura	Kōji Hōri (Note: Credited in the episode from the broadcast, but not on the website episode.); Masayoshi Nishida (Note: Credited in the episode from the website, but not on the broadcast episode.)	June 15, 2022
12	"Thanks, Everyone! RPG Real Estate's New Journey Begins!"; Transliteration: "Minna Arigatō! Āru Pī Jī Fudōsan, Aratanaru Tabidachi desu!" (Japanese: みんなありがとう! RPG不動産、新たなる旅立ちです!)	Tomoaki Koshida	Yoshiko Nakamura	Tomoaki Koshida	June 22, 2022
