= A Channel (manga) =

Japanese manga series

- The cover of the first manga volume, featuring one of the main characters, Tōru

Aチャンネル (Ē Channeru)
- Genre: Comedy, slice of life
- Manga
- Written by: bb Kuroda
- Published by: Houbunsha
- Magazine: Manga Time Kirara Carat
- Original run: December 2008 – January 2021
- Volumes: 11
- Anime television series
- Directed by: Manabu Ono
- Produced by: Tetsuya Endō; Atsuhiro Iwakami; Hiroyuki Kobayashi; Hiro Maruyama
- Written by: Tatsuhiko Urahata
- Music by: MONACA: Satoru Kōsaki
- Studio: Studio Gokumi
- Licensed by: NA: Sentai Filmworks (expired); SEA: Medialink
- Original network: TBS, MBS, CBC, Animax, Anime Network
- Original run: April 8, 2011 – June 24, 2011
- Episodes: 12
- Manga

A Channel ~days in junior high school~
- Written by: bb Kuroda
- Published by: Houbunsha
- Magazine: Manga Time Kirara Carino
- Original run: January 27, 2012 – June 26, 2013
- Original video animation

A Channel + smile
- Directed by: Manabu Ono
- Produced by: Tetsuya Endō; Hiroyuki Kobayashi; Shin'ichirō Kashiwada; Toshihiro Maeda
- Written by: Tatsuhiko Urahata
- Music by: MONACA: Satoru Kōsaki
- Studio: Studio Gokumi
- Licensed by: SEA: Medialink
- Released: March 21, 2012 – September 27, 2017
- Runtime: 24 minutes each
- Episodes: 3

A Channel (Aチャンネル, Ē Channeru), is a Japanese four-panel comic strip by bb Kuroda. It was serialized from 2008 to 2021 in the seinen manga magazine Manga Time Kirara Carat, published by Houbunsha. A prequel manga series, also by Kuroda, launched in Manga Time Kirara Carino from January 2012. An anime adaptation by Studio Gokumi aired in Japan between April 8, 2011, and June 24, 2011. An original video animation, A Channel +smile, was released on March 21, 2012.

== Plot ==
Adolescent girls Tooru Ichii and Run Momoki have been best friends since childhood. After passing her entrance exams, Tooru manages to enroll in the high school that Run is attending. Tooru decides to tell Run the news, only to come at a bad time and find her and her new classmate Yuko Nishi involved in an embarrassing situation, which makes things a bit awkward but funny on their first day of school, as Tooru begins fending off others who might show interest in Run while Yuko and another friend, Nagi Tennoji, start dealing with Run's own penchant for drama. As Run, Nagi and Yuuko begin their sophomore year while Tooru begins her freshman year, their high school life filled with drama, humor and adventure begins.

== Characters ==
=== Main characters ===
Tōru Ichii (一井 透 (トオル), Ichii Tōru)
Voiced by: Aoi Yūki
A short first year student who often has overly long sleeves. Due to her short and skinny stature, she often has trouble finding clothes that fit her. She has been friends with Run since kindergarten, often getting lonely when separated from her and threatening anyone who tries to make a move on her. She disliked Yūko at first, since her first impression of her was seeing her in a compromising situation with Run, and since then constantly teases her at every opportunity. She has a pet cat named Tansan (炭酸; named after fizzy drinks). Tooru is very fond of sweets, which her friends bribe her with.
Run Momoki (百木 るん, Momoki Run)
Voiced by: Kaori Fukuhara
A blonde second year student with a parakeet like hairstyle and Tōru's best friend. She is incredibly ditsy to the point that her friends often have to stop her from hurting herself in the process. She is very forgetful, even forgetting to wear her panties and bring her school stuff. Despite her qualities, she is very caring for Tooru and will try to help her when she's somewhat troubled.
Nagisa "Nagi" Tennōji (天王寺 渚 (ナギ), Tennōji Nagisa)
Voiced by: Yumi Uchiyama
She is a second year student and Run's classmate who sports pig-tails and glasses. She is often called by Run, Yūko, and Tōru by her nickname, Nagi. She is pretty intelligent and often makes quip remarks to her friends. She is sometimes conscious about her weight and hates extreme temperatures. She looks completely different when she lets her hair down and removes her glasses.
Yūko Nishi (西 由宇子 (ユー子), Nishi Yūko)
Voiced by: Minako Kotobuki
A long haired second year student and Run's classmate. She is something of a scaredy-cat who often finds herself at the mercy of Tōru's teasing, usually because she is envious of her tall and well endowed figure. She speaks with a prominent Kansai accent.

=== Other characters ===
Yutaka Imai (今井 豊 (ユタカ), Imai Yutaka)
Voiced by: Ai Matayoshi
A first year student and Tōru's classmate. She is a fan of Tōru and constantly tries to get friendly with her, much to Tōru's despair. She is very talkative and always takes the chance to get close to Tooru, but is always stopped by Miho.
Miho Noyama (野山 美歩 (ミホ), Noyama Miho)
Voiced by: Momoko Saitō
A first year student and Yutaka's friend and classmate, who Yutaka affectionally calls Mipo-rin. She is also a fan of Tōru, though not quite to the extremes of Yutaka, and constantly tries to keep Yutaka from bothering Tōru too much. She works part-time as a maid in a cafe.
Kimiko Kitō (鬼頭 紀美子, Kitō Kimiko)
Voiced by: Minori Chihara
Tōru's homeroom teacher, who is obsessed with poetry. She is often quite motivated in the mornings, much to the dismay of the students, and doesn't get along too well with Satō.
Taki Kamate (鎌手 多季, Kamate Taki)
Voiced by: Miyuki Sawashiro
Run, Yūko and Nagi's homeroom teacher, who has a rather laid back attitude. She is often seen teaching sports classes.
Sachiyo Satō (佐藤 幸世, Satō Sachiyo)
Voiced by: Daisuke Ono
The school's health teacher, who is actually rather weak himself. He appears to have a crush on Run and has an infatuation with her forehead.
Keiko (ケイ子)
Voiced by: Yuka Iguchi
Yūko's younger sister who is quite dedicated to her sister.

== Books and publications ==
=== Manga ===
The manga by bb Kuroda began serialization in Manga Time Kirara Carat from October 28, 2008. Eleven tankōbon volumes have been released as of November 25, 2020. An anthology comic featuring guest authors was released on June 27, 2011. A prequel manga series, A Channel ~days in junior high school~ began serialization in Manga Time Kirara Carino magazine from January 27, 2012.

No.	Release date	ISBN
1	November 26, 2009	978-4-8322-7876-9
2	March 26, 2011	978-4-8322-4007-0
3	March 27, 2012	978-4-8322-4127-5
4	February 27, 2013	978-4-8322-4265-4
5	February 27, 2014	978-4-8322-4408-5
6	March 27, 2015	978-4-8322-4544-0
7	March 26, 2016	978-4-8322-4677-5
8	March 27, 2017	978-4-8322-4816-8
9	May 26, 2018	978-4-8322-4948-6
10	October 25, 2019	978-4-8322-7128-9
11	November 25, 2020	978-4-8322-7236-1

=== Art book ===
No.	Title	Release date	ISBN
1	Beautiful Box	March 27, 2017	ISBN 978-4-8322-4821-2
2	Baby Blue	January 27, 2021	ISBN 978-4-8322-7247-7

=== Comics anthology ===
No.	Release date	ISBN
1	June 27, 2011	ISBN 978-4-8322-4043-8

=== Official Guide Book ===
No.	Title	Release date	ISBN
1	A Channel.zip: "A Channel" Visual Fan Book	July 27, 2011	ISBN 978-4-8322-4050-6
2	A Channel TV Anime Official Guide Book -colorful days collection-	August 27, 2011	ISBN 978-4-8322-4060-5

== Anime ==
An anime adaptation produced by Studio Gokumi aired in Japan between April 8, 2011, and June 24, 2011. The series began release on Blu-ray Disc and DVD from May 25, 2011, with each volume containing two short +A Channel mini-episodes. Sentai Filmworks released the series on DVD in North America on February 28, 2012, with a Blu-ray release followed on January 27, 2015. An OVA, titled A Channel + smile, was released on March 21, 2012. Another OVA episode was included with a Blu-ray Disc Box released on September 27, 2017. Sentai Filmworks's license for A Channel expired on April 30, 2019.

=== Music ===
Opening Theme

- "Morning Arch" by Marina Kawano (TV)
- "Balloon Theatre" (バルーンシアター, Barūn Shiatā) by Marina Kawano (OVA)

Ending Theme

- "Humming Girl" (ハミングガール, Hamingu Gāru) by Aoi Yūki, Kaori Fukuhara, Minako Kotobuki and Yumi Uchiyama (TV)
- "Smile Equation" (スマイル方程式, Sumairu Hōteishiki) by Aoi Yūki, Kaori Fukuhara, Minako Kotobuki and Yumi Uchiyama (OVA)

Insert Songs

- "Chemistry of a Spring Breeze" (はるかぜの化学, Harukaze No Kagaku) by Kaori Fukuhara, Aoi Yūki, Minako Kotobuki and Yumi Uchiyama (ep. 1; ep. 12)
- "Start" by Kaori Fukuhara, Aoi Yūki, Minako Kotobuki and Yumi Uchiyama (ep. 2)
- "I Want to Hold You Tight" (ぎゅっとして欲しいんだ, Gyutto Shite Hoshiinda) by Aoi Yūki (ep. 3)
- "Summer Dream Syndrome" by Kaori Fukuhara (ep. 4)
- "Mermaid Sisters" by Minako Kotobuki (ep. 5)
- "Let's Explore!" (たんけんのススメ, Tanken No Susume) by Yumi Uchiyama (ep. 6)
- "Summer Breeze" by Minako Kotobuki (ep. 7)
- "Tea's Melodical Beauty Bang Bang" (オチャメロディカルビューティーバンバン, Ocha Merodikaru Byūtī Ban Ban) by Kaori Fukuhara (ep. 7)
- "One Night's Love, One Night's Dream" (恋一夜夢一夜, Koi Ichiya, Yume Ichiya) by Yumi Uchiyama (ep. 7)
- "Friends" (ともだち, Tomodachi) by Kaori Fukuhara and Aoi Yūki (ep. 7)
- "Your Hand" (君の手, Kimi no Te) by Daisuke Ono (ep. 7)
- "We Don't Have Wings" (翼はないけど, Tsubasa wa Nai Kedo) by Kaori Fukuhara and Aoi Yūki (ep. 8)
- "Sweets Time" (オカシナ時間, Okashi na Jikan) by Kaori Fukuhara, Aoi Yūki, Minako Kotobuki and Yumi Uchiyama (ep. 9)
- "Happy Snow" by Kaori Fukuhara, Aoi Yūki, Minako Kotobuki and Yumi Uchiyama (ep. 10)
- "Surely, Always, More" (きっと ずっと もっと, Kitto Zutto Motto) by Aoi Yūki (ep. 11)
- "Unidentified Flying Girl" (未確認飛行ガール, Mikakuninhikō Gāru) by Minako Kotobuki and Yumi Uchiyama (ep. 12)
- "A Special Place" (大切な場所, Taisetsu na Basho) by Aoi Yūki, Ai Matayoshi and Momoko Saitō (OVA ep. 1)
- "Happy New Days" by Aoi Yūki, Kaori Fukuhara, Minako Kotobuki and Yumi Uchiyama (OVA ep. 2)

== Appearances in other media ==
Characters from the series appear alongside other Manga Time Kirara characters in the 2017 mobile RPG, Kirara Fantasia.
