= Manga Time Kirara Carat =

Japanese manga magazine

- Cover of the December 2006 issue, featuring Yuno
- Categories: Seinen
- Frequency: Monthly
- Circulation: 80,000 (2019)
- First issue: Special issue of Manga Time Kirara in January 2003; November 2005 (released in September 2005)
- Company: Houbunsha
- Country: Japan
- Language: Japanese
- Website: Official website

Manga Time Kirara Carat (まんがタイムきららキャラット, Manga Taimu Kirara Kyaratto) is a Japanese seinen manga magazine published by Houbunsha and mainly consisting of four-panel comic strips. It is released on the 28th of each month. The first issue was released on January 18, 2003, as a special edition of Manga Time Kirara. The first independent issue was released on September 28, 2005.

== List of serialized titles ==
- A Channel (Aチャンネル)
- The Airs
- Anima Yell! (アニマエール！)
- Bad Girl (ばっどがーる) (ongoing)
- Blend S (ブレンド・S)
- Dōjin Work (ドージンワーク)
- Exorcist to Kubiwa no Akuma (エクソシストと首輪の悪魔)
- Fujoko to Yuriko (ふじょ子とユリ子)
- GA Geijutsuka Art Design Class (GA 芸術科アートデザインクラス)
- Gokicha (ごきチャ)
- Gokigenyō, Ikkyoku Ika ga? (ごきげんよう、一局いかが?)
- H・R
- Hanafuri Yado no Yadokari Otome (花降り宿のやどかり乙女)
- Harumaki!
- Harumination (はるみねーしょん)
- Hidamari Sketch (ひだまりスケッチ) (ongoing)
- Himekurasu
- Ichiroo!
- Idol × Idol Story!
- K-On!
- Kagura Mai Mai! (ongoing)
- Kamisama no Iutoori!
- Kill Me Baby (キルミーベイベー) (ongoing)
- Koisuru Asteroid (恋する小惑星) (ongoing)
- Kotonaru Jigen no Kanrinin-san (異なる次元の管理人さん) (ongoing)
- Kuu Kuu Boku Boku
- Machikado Mazoku (まちカドまぞく) (ongoing)
- Mayuka no Darling!
- Mono (ongoing)
- Nekojima Nyandafull (ネコじまにゃんだフル)
- New Game! (ニューゲーム)
- Niko ga Santa (ニコがサンタ)
- Ochikobore Fruit Tart (おちこぼれフルーツタルト)
- OK Fantasista!
- Okonomide! (おこのみで!)
- Puella Magi Kazumi Magica
- Pura Misurando
- RPG Fudōsan
- Seigi no Hanamichi (正義ノ花道) (ongoing)
- Senpai ga Oyobi desu! (先パイがお呼びです!) (ongoing)
- S.S. Astro (ongoing)
- Swap⇔Swap
- Takuaka!
- Tamago Nama
- Tsumugu Otome to Taishou no Tsuki

== List of anime adaptations ==
- Hidamari Sketch – Winter 2007
- Dōjin Work – Summer 2007
- Hidamari Sketch × 365 – Summer 2008
- K-On! – Spring 2009
- GA Geijutsuka Art Design Class – Summer 2009
- Hidamari Sketch × Hoshimittsu – Winter 2010
- K-On!! – Spring 2010
- A Channel – Spring 2011
- Kill Me Baby – Winter 2012
- Hidamari Sketch × Honeycomb – Fall 2012
- Gokicha (ONA) (Note: Streamed on Nico Nico Douga from September 14, 2012.) – 2012
- New Game! – Summer 2016
- New Game!! – Summer 2017
- Blend S – Fall 2017
- Anima Yell! – Fall 2018
- Machikado Mazoku – Summer 2019
- Koisuru Asteroid – Winter 2020
- Ochikobore Fruit Tart – Fall 2020
- Machikado Mazoku 2 – Spring 2022
- RPG Fudōsan – Spring 2022
- Mono – Spring 2025
- Bad Girl – Summer 2025
- Gokigenyō, Ikkyoku Ika ga? – TBA

== List of game adaptations ==
- Hidamari Sketch Dokodemo Sugoroku × 365 – February 12, 2009
- GA: Geijutsuka Art Design Class -Slapstick Wonderland- – July 29, 2010
- New Game!: The Challenge Stage – January 26, 2017
- Kirara Fantasia – December 11, 2017

== See also ==
- Manga Time Kirara
- Manga Time Kirara Max
- Manga Time Kirara Forward
