= Pleasure Dome =

Japanese manga

歓楽宮 (Kanrakukyuu)
- Genre: Yaoi
- Manga
- Written by: Minami Megumi
- Published by: Houbunsha
- English publisher: NA: Kitty Media
- Imprint: Hanaoto Comics
- Published: October 2000

Pleasure Dome (歓楽宮, Kanrakukyuu) is a 2000 yaoi manga by Minami Megumi. It was originally published by Houbunsha, and was licensed in English by Kitty Media on 14 February 2007.

== Reception ==
Leia Weathington, writing for the appendix to Manga: The Complete Guide, described the manga as "unapologetically raw and dramatic", cautioning that it was only for the "seasoned" BL fan. Patricia Beard felt some of the stories attempted to be more than simply gratuitous. Casey Brienza enjoyed the exotic settings of Pleasure Dome, but was disappointed at the brevity of the stories.
