= Houbunsha =

Japanese publishing company

Houbunsha Co., Ltd.
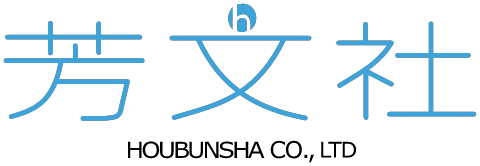

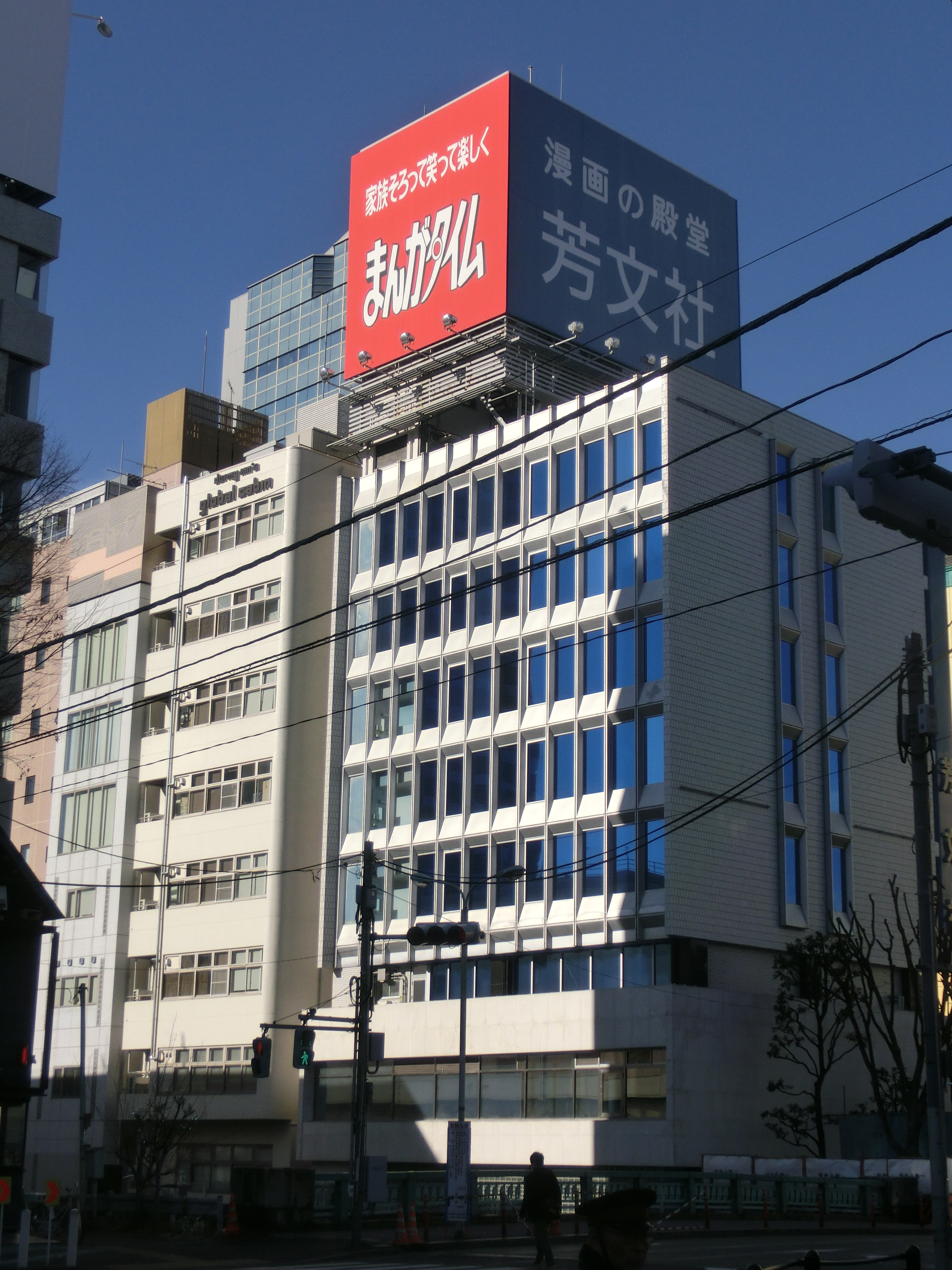
- Headquarters in Bunkyō, Tokyo
- Native name: 株式会社芳文社
- Romanized name: Kabushiki-gaisha Hōbunsha
- Type: Private
- Industry: Publishing
- Founded: July 10, 1950; 76 years ago
- Headquarters: Koraku, Bunkyō, Tokyo, Japan
- Products: Books; Magazines; Manga
- Number of employees: 60 (2018)
- Website: houbunsha.co.jp

Houbunsha Co., Ltd (株式会社 芳文社, KK Hōbunsha) is a Japanese publishing company founded on July 10, 1950. It is based in Bunkyo-ku, Tokyo.

== History of Houbunsha ==
In 1946, the founder, Yoshichika Koso, proclaimed the vision of establishing Shobunkan to provide entertainment through publishing to children who were losing hope amidst the chaos of post-war, encouraging them and nurturing individuals worthy of entrusting Japan's future reconstruction. The launching of "Yakyū shōnen" became immensely popular. However, in the autumn of 1949, a publishing panic known as the "Mountain of Returns" occurred, and Shobunkan, unable to withstand this turmoil, transferred its debts and assets, establishing the new company, Houbunsha, on July 10, 1950.

Although once hailed as the king of boys' magazines, "Yakyū shōnen" continued to decline due to the increasing influence of mass media such as sports newspapers and television. Overcoming seven years of hardship until around the mid-1957, thanks to the success of Japan's first manga weekly magazine, Weekly Manga TIMES made a remarkable comeback.

Considering whether a weekly magazine which was then small-scale could be published, they decided to launch Japan's first manga-focused weekly magazine. The success of Weekly Manga TIMES was groundbreaking, paving the way for the subsequent weekly magazine boom.

With the backdrop of the television boom, the society has entered an era of visual transformation. With the conviction that the age of "visual story magazines" would come, they launched Japan's first youth dramatic manga magazine, Comic Magazine focusing on thrilling, suspenseful, humanistic, and erotic stories. This sparked a major dramatic manga boom as similar magazines flooded the market. In 1969, overcoming numerous challenges, the company established its long-awaited new headquarters in Korakuen, Bunkyo-ku.

In 1971, Yoshichika Koso, who became the chairman of the board of directors, poured even more passion into publishing management. The culmination of his efforts was seen in 1974 when Weekly Manga TIMES recorded its highest circulation of 974,000 copies, proving the effectiveness of creative innovation. Subsequently, they maintained a high circulation of 600,000 to 700,000 copies in regular issues, establishing the golden age of Houbunsha.

In 1980, with the development of new projects following the success of Weekly Manga TIMES becoming urgent, Yoshichika Koso, noticing the popularity of Masashi Ueda's four-panel manga Nonki-kun serialized in Manga Punch, instructed the development of a magazine centered around gag manga. In 1981, anticipating the reader demand for a manga magazine focused on laughter, they launched Japan's first family four-panel manga magazine, Manga Time, initiating a four-panel manga boom.

As manga diversified further and integrated into readers' daily lives, the market expanded to a scale of trillion of yen, including anime, character goods, and game software, growing into a mass production industry literally. Amidst the expansion of comic culture, readers' needs became even more segmented, giving birth to new manga magazines, one of which was the ladies' comics magazine. In 1986, the company launched LOVING. Subsequently, in 1994, they ventured into the field of aesthetic comics with Kanon.

With the widespread of personal computers and mobile phones, traditional reading styles underwent significant changes, leading to a continued decline in overall sales in the publishing industry. In response, in 2003, targeting the purchasing power of the so-called "otaku" demographic, they launched the Manga Time Kirara, a moe-themed four-panel manga magazine. They later released sister magazines such as Manga Time Kirara Max, Manga Time Kirara Carat, and story-driven Manga Time Kirara Forward. Moe culture became phenomenal, firmly establishing itself as part of Japanese culture.

Starting from 2006, they began by providing content for mobile phone distribution channels experimentally, and from 2007, they formally started offering content. Taking these trends into account, especially the accelerating digitization of the publishing industry, they established the cross-media business division in 2007, aiming to flexibly respond to organizational changes and expand into overseas markets, integrating new cultures and media to continue creating content beloved by many readers.

With the establishment of the brand image of the Manga Time Kirara group of moe-themed four-panel manga magazines, it became a treasure trove of popular works such as K-ON! and other content and characters.

== Magazines published by Houbunsha ==
- Weekly Manga Times
- Hana Oto
- Comic Fuz
- kyapi! (digital magazine)

=== Manga Time magazines ===
- Manga Time
- Manga Time Original
- Manga Home

=== Manga Time Kirara magazines ===
- Manga Time Kirara
- Manga Time Kirara Carat
- Manga Time Kirara Max
- Manga Time Kirara Forward

=== Discontinued magazines ===
- Tsubomi (2009–2012)
- Manga Time Jumbo (1985–2018)
- Manga Time Lovely (1994–2011)
- Manga Time Family (1984–2018)
- Manga Time Kirara Miracle! (2011–2017)
- Manga Time Special (1989–2019)
- Manga Time Dash!
- Manga Time Pop (2002–2003)
- Manga Time Kitsch! (1994-discontinued)
- Manga Time Kirara Magica - A dedicated Puella Magi Madoka Magica magazine (irregular publication)

=== Manga ===
- Only Serious About You (2010)
- Pleasure Dome (2000)
