= List of minor planets: 697001–698000 =

The following is a partial list of minor planets, running from minor-planet number 697001 through 698000, inclusive. The primary data for this and other partial lists is based on JPL's "Small-Body Orbital Elements" and data available from the Minor Planet Center. Critical list information is also provided by the MPC, unless otherwise specified from Lowell Observatory. A detailed description of the table's columns and additional sources are given on the main page including a complete list of every page in this series, and a statistical break-up on the dynamical classification of minor planets.

Also see the summary list of all named bodies in numerical and alphabetical order, and the corresponding naming citations for the number range of this particular list. New namings may only be added to this list after official publication, as the preannouncement of names is condemned by the Working Group for Small Bodies Nomenclature of the International Astronomical Union.

Near-Earth obj.	MBA (inner)	MBA (outer)	Centaur
Mars-crosser	MBA (middle)	Jupiter trojan	Trans-Neptunian obj.
Unclassified

== 697001–697100 ==
Designation			Discovery			Properties		Ref
Permanent	Provisional	Named after	Date	Site	Discoverer(s)	Category	Diam.	Ref
697001	2016 UG_{18}	—	October 20, 2016	Mount Lemmon	Mount Lemmon Survey	EOS	1.5 km	MPC · JPL
697002	2016 UQ_{19}	—	October 10, 2007	Kitt Peak	Spacewatch	·	1.4 km	MPC · JPL
697003	2016 UV_{19}	—	April 23, 2011	Kitt Peak	Spacewatch	·	1.4 km	MPC · JPL
697004	2016 UL_{22}	—	August 31, 2005	Palomar	NEAT	·	1.0 km	MPC · JPL
697005	2016 UP_{22}	—	May 13, 2015	Mount Lemmon	Mount Lemmon Survey	·	1.1 km	MPC · JPL
697006	2016 UM_{24}	—	October 2, 2016	Mount Lemmon	Mount Lemmon Survey	·	1.6 km	MPC · JPL
697007	2016 UO_{24}	—	September 27, 2016	Haleakala	Pan-STARRS 1	·	2.4 km	MPC · JPL
697008	2016 UH_{25}	—	March 29, 2014	Mount Lemmon	Mount Lemmon Survey	·	1.9 km	MPC · JPL
697009	2016 UB_{27}	—	October 2, 2016	Mount Lemmon	Mount Lemmon Survey	·	2.3 km	MPC · JPL
697010	2016 UQ_{32}	—	October 23, 2016	Mount Lemmon	Mount Lemmon Survey	EOS	1.2 km	MPC · JPL
697011	2016 UU_{32}	—	October 2, 2016	Mount Lemmon	Mount Lemmon Survey	·	1.4 km	MPC · JPL
697012	2016 UB_{34}	—	October 6, 2012	Haleakala	Pan-STARRS 1	·	810 m	MPC · JPL
697013	2016 UD_{34}	—	September 30, 2003	Kitt Peak	Spacewatch	JUN	910 m	MPC · JPL
697014	2016 UT_{34}	—	June 17, 2015	Haleakala	Pan-STARRS 1	·	2.4 km	MPC · JPL
697015	2016 UO_{35}	—	November 9, 2007	Kitt Peak	Spacewatch	HOF	2.0 km	MPC · JPL
697016	2016 UR_{35}	—	December 29, 2008	Kitt Peak	Spacewatch	EUN	1.1 km	MPC · JPL
697017	2016 UU_{37}	—	January 17, 2013	Haleakala	Pan-STARRS 1	·	1.8 km	MPC · JPL
697018	2016 UR_{42}	—	August 30, 2016	Mount Lemmon	Mount Lemmon Survey	·	2.2 km	MPC · JPL
697019	2016 UR_{45}	—	August 29, 2006	Kitt Peak	Spacewatch	BRA	1.1 km	MPC · JPL
697020	2016 UJ_{51}	—	October 25, 2016	Haleakala	Pan-STARRS 1	EUP	2.6 km	MPC · JPL
697021	2016 UF_{52}	—	September 5, 2002	Socorro	LINEAR	·	1.4 km	MPC · JPL
697022	2016 UX_{53}	—	September 19, 2006	Kitt Peak	Spacewatch	KOR	1.2 km	MPC · JPL
697023	2016 UD_{54}	—	April 2, 2009	Mount Lemmon	Mount Lemmon Survey	·	1.7 km	MPC · JPL
697024	2016 UJ_{56}	—	December 10, 2009	Mount Lemmon	Mount Lemmon Survey	V	590 m	MPC · JPL
697025	2016 UM_{56}	—	October 26, 2016	Haleakala	Pan-STARRS 1	EOS	1.4 km	MPC · JPL
697026	2016 UV_{57}	—	April 19, 2012	Mount Lemmon	Mount Lemmon Survey	·	760 m	MPC · JPL
697027	2016 UQ_{60}	—	March 19, 2009	Mount Lemmon	Mount Lemmon Survey	·	1.7 km	MPC · JPL
697028	2016 UD_{61}	—	May 12, 2007	Kitt Peak	Spacewatch	(5)	990 m	MPC · JPL
697029	2016 UE_{65}	—	February 1, 2009	Kitt Peak	Spacewatch	·	1.7 km	MPC · JPL
697030	2016 UQ_{69}	—	July 19, 2015	Haleakala	Pan-STARRS 1	KOR	1.0 km	MPC · JPL
697031	2016 UO_{73}	—	October 11, 2016	Mount Lemmon	Mount Lemmon Survey	·	1.6 km	MPC · JPL
697032	2016 UB_{74}	—	September 27, 2006	Mount Lemmon	Mount Lemmon Survey	·	1.5 km	MPC · JPL
697033	2016 UM_{79}	—	May 21, 2011	Mount Lemmon	Mount Lemmon Survey	·	970 m	MPC · JPL
697034	2016 UT_{79}	—	October 7, 2016	Mount Lemmon	Mount Lemmon Survey	MRX	910 m	MPC · JPL
697035	2016 UB_{81}	—	October 25, 2016	Haleakala	Pan-STARRS 1	·	2.2 km	MPC · JPL
697036	2016 UR_{81}	—	May 26, 2015	Haleakala	Pan-STARRS 1	·	1.7 km	MPC · JPL
697037	2016 UX_{82}	—	September 26, 2011	Haleakala	Pan-STARRS 1	KOR	930 m	MPC · JPL
697038	2016 UH_{84}	—	September 25, 2006	Kitt Peak	Spacewatch	KOR	1.1 km	MPC · JPL
697039	2016 UP_{84}	—	January 10, 2013	Haleakala	Pan-STARRS 1	KOR	970 m	MPC · JPL
697040	2016 UT_{84}	—	September 26, 2011	Mount Lemmon	Mount Lemmon Survey	·	1.4 km	MPC · JPL
697041	2016 UU_{85}	—	September 30, 2005	Mount Lemmon	Mount Lemmon Survey	·	2.3 km	MPC · JPL
697042	2016 UP_{86}	—	September 30, 2016	Haleakala	Pan-STARRS 1	·	1.9 km	MPC · JPL
697043	2016 UD_{87}	—	October 20, 2016	Mount Lemmon	Mount Lemmon Survey	KOR	1.1 km	MPC · JPL
697044	2016 UT_{87}	—	August 27, 2006	Kitt Peak	Spacewatch	KOR	1.1 km	MPC · JPL
697045	2016 UG_{89}	—	October 24, 2011	Haleakala	Pan-STARRS 1	·	1.4 km	MPC · JPL
697046	2016 UE_{93}	—	October 26, 2011	Haleakala	Pan-STARRS 1	·	1.7 km	MPC · JPL
697047	2016 UC_{98}	—	September 23, 2011	Mount Lemmon	Mount Lemmon Survey	·	1.3 km	MPC · JPL
697048	2016 UE_{98}	—	April 7, 2005	Mount Lemmon	Mount Lemmon Survey	·	1.4 km	MPC · JPL
697049	2016 UK_{98}	—	September 20, 2011	Mount Lemmon	Mount Lemmon Survey	·	1.4 km	MPC · JPL
697050	2016 UX_{98}	—	September 23, 2011	Haleakala	Pan-STARRS 1	KOR	1.1 km	MPC · JPL
697051	2016 UO_{99}	—	October 26, 2016	Haleakala	Pan-STARRS 1	·	1.3 km	MPC · JPL
697052	2016 UP_{102}	—	September 30, 2016	Haleakala	Pan-STARRS 1	·	1.4 km	MPC · JPL
697053	2016 UV_{103}	—	May 7, 2014	Haleakala	Pan-STARRS 1	EOS	1.3 km	MPC · JPL
697054	2016 UC_{104}	—	October 1, 2005	Mount Lemmon	Mount Lemmon Survey	THM	1.6 km	MPC · JPL
697055	2016 UX_{105}	—	August 27, 2011	Haleakala	Pan-STARRS 1	·	1.5 km	MPC · JPL
697056	2016 UH_{112}	—	October 26, 2016	Haleakala	Pan-STARRS 1	KOR	900 m	MPC · JPL
697057	2016 UT_{112}	—	July 27, 2011	Haleakala	Pan-STARRS 1	·	1.1 km	MPC · JPL
697058	2016 UK_{115}	—	October 27, 2016	Mount Lemmon	Mount Lemmon Survey	·	1.7 km	MPC · JPL
697059	2016 UZ_{123}	—	September 23, 2012	Mayhill-ISON	L. Elenin	·	1.2 km	MPC · JPL
697060	2016 US_{125}	—	May 15, 2015	Haleakala	Pan-STARRS 1	·	1.5 km	MPC · JPL
697061	2016 UU_{125}	—	October 19, 2011	Kitt Peak	Spacewatch	KOR	1.3 km	MPC · JPL
697062	2016 UZ_{127}	—	May 20, 2015	Haleakala	Pan-STARRS 1	·	1.0 km	MPC · JPL
697063	2016 UG_{131}	—	January 20, 2009	Mount Lemmon	Mount Lemmon Survey	MRX	790 m	MPC · JPL
697064	2016 UY_{131}	—	April 23, 2014	Cerro Tololo	DECam	KOR	920 m	MPC · JPL
697065	2016 UA_{132}	—	April 5, 2008	Kitt Peak	Spacewatch	·	1.9 km	MPC · JPL
697066	2016 UJ_{133}	—	October 26, 2011	Haleakala	Pan-STARRS 1	·	1.7 km	MPC · JPL
697067	2016 UP_{134}	—	October 24, 2005	Kitt Peak	Spacewatch	·	2.1 km	MPC · JPL
697068	2016 UK_{138}	—	March 8, 2008	Mount Lemmon	Mount Lemmon Survey	·	1.5 km	MPC · JPL
697069	2016 UG_{139}	—	June 26, 2015	Haleakala	Pan-STARRS 1	·	2.5 km	MPC · JPL
697070	2016 UF_{141}	—	October 9, 2016	Haleakala	Pan-STARRS 1	·	2.7 km	MPC · JPL
697071	2016 UL_{142}	—	October 30, 2011	Ka-Dar	Gerke, V.	EUP	2.9 km	MPC · JPL
697072	2016 UJ_{144}	—	April 11, 2005	Mount Lemmon	Mount Lemmon Survey	HOF	2.2 km	MPC · JPL
697073	2016 UL_{144}	—	July 28, 2011	Haleakala	Pan-STARRS 1	MRX	910 m	MPC · JPL
697074	2016 UF_{146}	—	September 17, 1995	Kitt Peak	Spacewatch	·	1.2 km	MPC · JPL
697075	2016 UR_{156}	—	October 26, 2016	Haleakala	Pan-STARRS 1	·	1.3 km	MPC · JPL
697076	2016 UJ_{192}	—	May 21, 2014	Haleakala	Pan-STARRS 1	·	1.2 km	MPC · JPL
697077	2016 UJ_{193}	—	June 15, 2015	Mount Lemmon	Mount Lemmon Survey	·	990 m	MPC · JPL
697078	2016 UB_{203}	—	April 23, 2014	Cerro Tololo	DECam	KOR	800 m	MPC · JPL
697079	2016 UE_{207}	—	July 19, 2015	Haleakala	Pan-STARRS 1	KOR	830 m	MPC · JPL
697080	2016 UQ_{246}	—	October 20, 2016	Mount Lemmon	Mount Lemmon Survey	·	1.5 km	MPC · JPL
697081	2016 UJ_{247}	—	October 20, 2016	Mount Lemmon	Mount Lemmon Survey	·	1.8 km	MPC · JPL
697082	2016 UQ_{247}	—	October 20, 2016	Mount Lemmon	Mount Lemmon Survey	·	1.6 km	MPC · JPL
697083	2016 UZ_{247}	—	October 28, 2016	Haleakala	Pan-STARRS 1	·	3.1 km	MPC · JPL
697084	2016 UB_{248}	—	October 21, 2016	Mount Lemmon	Mount Lemmon Survey	·	700 m	MPC · JPL
697085	2016 UU_{248}	—	October 30, 2016	Catalina	CSS	·	2.2 km	MPC · JPL
697086	2016 UB_{249}	—	October 26, 2016	Haleakala	Pan-STARRS 1	·	540 m	MPC · JPL
697087	2016 UM_{249}	—	October 27, 2016	Mount Lemmon	Mount Lemmon Survey	·	1.5 km	MPC · JPL
697088	2016 UB_{251}	—	October 19, 2016	Haleakala	Pan-STARRS 1	AGN	820 m	MPC · JPL
697089	2016 UO_{251}	—	October 1, 2016	Mount Lemmon	Mount Lemmon Survey	·	1.4 km	MPC · JPL
697090	2016 UX_{251}	—	October 28, 2016	Haleakala	Pan-STARRS 1	·	2.2 km	MPC · JPL
697091	2016 UB_{252}	—	October 25, 2016	Haleakala	Pan-STARRS 1	TIR	2.1 km	MPC · JPL
697092	2016 UA_{256}	—	October 31, 2016	Mount Lemmon	Mount Lemmon Survey	·	1.6 km	MPC · JPL
697093	2016 UF_{261}	—	October 28, 2016	Haleakala	Pan-STARRS 1	·	2.5 km	MPC · JPL
697094	2016 UY_{266}	—	October 19, 2016	Haleakala	Pan-STARRS 1	AGN	870 m	MPC · JPL
697095	2016 UN_{268}	—	February 26, 2014	Haleakala	Pan-STARRS 1	·	1.5 km	MPC · JPL
697096	2016 UZ_{268}	—	October 23, 2016	Mount Lemmon	Mount Lemmon Survey	·	2.1 km	MPC · JPL
697097	2016 UG_{270}	—	October 27, 2016	Mount Lemmon	Mount Lemmon Survey	·	1.8 km	MPC · JPL
697098	2016 UZ_{271}	—	October 30, 2016	Mount Lemmon	Mount Lemmon Survey	·	2.5 km	MPC · JPL
697099	2016 UV_{275}	—	October 28, 2016	Haleakala	Pan-STARRS 1	EOS	1.4 km	MPC · JPL
697100	2016 UY_{275}	—	October 28, 2016	Haleakala	Pan-STARRS 1	EOS	1.2 km	MPC · JPL

== 697101–697200 ==
back to top

Designation			Discovery			Properties		Ref
Permanent	Provisional	Named after	Date	Site	Discoverer(s)	Category	Diam.	Ref
697101	2016 UA_{276}	—	October 21, 2016	Mount Lemmon	Mount Lemmon Survey	EOS	1.3 km	MPC · JPL
697102	2016 UG_{276}	—	October 19, 2016	Mount Lemmon	Mount Lemmon Survey	·	1.9 km	MPC · JPL
697103	2016 UW_{277}	—	October 21, 2016	Mount Lemmon	Mount Lemmon Survey	·	1.3 km	MPC · JPL
697104	2016 UD_{278}	—	October 28, 2016	Haleakala	Pan-STARRS 1	·	2.6 km	MPC · JPL
697105	2016 UX_{278}	—	October 27, 2016	Mount Lemmon	Mount Lemmon Survey	·	1.7 km	MPC · JPL
697106	2016 UT_{279}	—	October 29, 2016	Mount Lemmon	Mount Lemmon Survey	·	2.3 km	MPC · JPL
697107	2016 UO_{285}	—	October 21, 2016	Mount Lemmon	Mount Lemmon Survey	·	2.2 km	MPC · JPL
697108	2016 UE_{290}	—	October 27, 2016	Mount Lemmon	Mount Lemmon Survey	·	2.2 km	MPC · JPL
697109	2016 VA_{7}	—	March 29, 2006	Kitt Peak	Spacewatch	·	1.3 km	MPC · JPL
697110	2016 VL_{10}	—	October 13, 2016	Haleakala	Pan-STARRS 1	·	1.8 km	MPC · JPL
697111	2016 VW_{10}	—	October 21, 2011	Haleakala	Pan-STARRS 1	·	1.6 km	MPC · JPL
697112	2016 VM_{11}	—	September 29, 2011	Kitt Peak	Spacewatch	KOR	1.1 km	MPC · JPL
697113	2016 VQ_{11}	—	October 21, 2011	Mount Lemmon	Mount Lemmon Survey	EOS	1.5 km	MPC · JPL
697114	2016 VE_{12}	—	June 16, 2015	Haleakala	Pan-STARRS 1	EOS	1.6 km	MPC · JPL
697115	2016 VS_{12}	—	August 10, 2015	Haleakala	Pan-STARRS 1	KOR	990 m	MPC · JPL
697116	2016 VW_{12}	—	September 30, 2005	Mount Lemmon	Mount Lemmon Survey	·	1.6 km	MPC · JPL
697117	2016 VH_{13}	—	August 30, 2011	Haleakala	Pan-STARRS 1	·	1.6 km	MPC · JPL
697118	2016 VY_{13}	—	March 13, 2005	Kitt Peak	Spacewatch	·	1.5 km	MPC · JPL
697119	2016 VH_{17}	—	May 7, 2014	Haleakala	Pan-STARRS 1	EOS	1.5 km	MPC · JPL
697120	2016 VQ_{19}	—	November 15, 2015	Haleakala	Pan-STARRS 1	·	2.5 km	MPC · JPL
697121	2016 VZ_{21}	—	October 12, 2016	Mount Lemmon	Mount Lemmon Survey	·	3.1 km	MPC · JPL
697122	2016 VW_{27}	—	November 5, 2016	Mount Lemmon	Mount Lemmon Survey	·	1.5 km	MPC · JPL
697123	2016 VT_{28}	—	November 6, 2016	Mount Lemmon	Mount Lemmon Survey	·	2.0 km	MPC · JPL
697124	2016 VM_{29}	—	November 6, 2016	Mount Lemmon	Mount Lemmon Survey	·	2.8 km	MPC · JPL
697125	2016 VR_{29}	—	November 11, 2016	Mount Lemmon	Mount Lemmon Survey	·	1.3 km	MPC · JPL
697126	2016 VV_{29}	—	November 11, 2016	Mount Lemmon	Mount Lemmon Survey	T_{j} (2.98)	2.7 km	MPC · JPL
697127	2016 VB_{30}	—	November 10, 2016	Mount Lemmon	Mount Lemmon Survey	·	2.0 km	MPC · JPL
697128	2016 VE_{31}	—	November 4, 2016	Haleakala	Pan-STARRS 1	·	1.7 km	MPC · JPL
697129	2016 VL_{31}	—	November 10, 2016	Haleakala	Pan-STARRS 1	·	2.1 km	MPC · JPL
697130	2016 VT_{31}	—	November 4, 2016	Haleakala	Pan-STARRS 1	EOS	1.5 km	MPC · JPL
697131	2016 VW_{32}	—	November 4, 2016	Haleakala	Pan-STARRS 1	·	1.8 km	MPC · JPL
697132	2016 VC_{34}	—	November 5, 2016	Haleakala	Pan-STARRS 1	·	1.7 km	MPC · JPL
697133	2016 VX_{34}	—	December 3, 2015	Haleakala	Pan-STARRS 1	·	2.7 km	MPC · JPL
697134	2016 VE_{36}	—	November 4, 2016	Haleakala	Pan-STARRS 1	·	1.9 km	MPC · JPL
697135	2016 VZ_{45}	—	November 3, 2016	Haleakala	Pan-STARRS 1	TIR	1.8 km	MPC · JPL
697136	2016 VD_{49}	—	November 10, 2016	Haleakala	Pan-STARRS 1	·	2.2 km	MPC · JPL
697137	2016 VG_{49}	—	November 6, 2016	Mount Lemmon	Mount Lemmon Survey	·	1.9 km	MPC · JPL
697138	2016 VP_{52}	—	November 5, 2016	Mount Lemmon	Mount Lemmon Survey	EOS	1.3 km	MPC · JPL
697139	2016 VF_{53}	—	November 10, 2016	Haleakala	Pan-STARRS 1	·	2.7 km	MPC · JPL
697140	2016 VG_{55}	—	November 4, 2016	Haleakala	Pan-STARRS 1	·	1.4 km	MPC · JPL
697141	2016 VP_{55}	—	May 20, 2014	Haleakala	Pan-STARRS 1	·	1.5 km	MPC · JPL
697142	2016 VC_{56}	—	November 7, 2016	Haleakala	Pan-STARRS 1	·	2.4 km	MPC · JPL
697143	2016 VE_{56}	—	November 7, 2016	Kitt Peak	Spacewatch	·	1.5 km	MPC · JPL
697144	2016 VC_{57}	—	November 6, 2016	Haleakala	Pan-STARRS 1	KOR	960 m	MPC · JPL
697145	2016 VT_{57}	—	November 10, 2016	Haleakala	Pan-STARRS 1	·	2.2 km	MPC · JPL
697146	2016 VY_{57}	—	November 8, 2016	Haleakala	Pan-STARRS 1	·	2.1 km	MPC · JPL
697147	2016 VK_{59}	—	November 5, 2016	Haleakala	Pan-STARRS 1	·	2.6 km	MPC · JPL
697148	2016 VH_{63}	—	November 4, 2016	Haleakala	Pan-STARRS 1	ARM	2.5 km	MPC · JPL
697149	2016 VP_{63}	—	November 5, 2016	Mount Lemmon	Mount Lemmon Survey	·	2.2 km	MPC · JPL
697150	2016 VW_{66}	—	November 3, 2016	Haleakala	Pan-STARRS 1	·	2.3 km	MPC · JPL
697151	2016 WA_{5}	—	October 25, 2016	Haleakala	Pan-STARRS 1	EOS	1.5 km	MPC · JPL
697152	2016 WZ_{5}	—	November 19, 2003	Kitt Peak	Spacewatch	·	1.2 km	MPC · JPL
697153	2016 WS_{6}	—	November 10, 2016	Haleakala	Pan-STARRS 1	T_{j} (2.99)	4.0 km	MPC · JPL
697154	2016 WP_{10}	—	October 12, 2005	Kitt Peak	Spacewatch	THM	1.9 km	MPC · JPL
697155	2016 WU_{15}	—	January 8, 2007	Mount Lemmon	Mount Lemmon Survey	·	1.3 km	MPC · JPL
697156	2016 WF_{17}	—	October 26, 2016	Haleakala	Pan-STARRS 1	·	2.2 km	MPC · JPL
697157	2016 WM_{20}	—	October 25, 2005	Kitt Peak	Spacewatch	·	2.2 km	MPC · JPL
697158	2016 WN_{20}	—	November 4, 2016	Haleakala	Pan-STARRS 1	·	1.4 km	MPC · JPL
697159	2016 WJ_{21}	—	May 12, 2013	Haleakala	Pan-STARRS 1	·	2.4 km	MPC · JPL
697160	2016 WM_{21}	—	December 23, 2012	Haleakala	Pan-STARRS 1	·	1.4 km	MPC · JPL
697161	2016 WG_{24}	—	October 12, 2016	Mount Lemmon	Mount Lemmon Survey	BRA	1.2 km	MPC · JPL
697162	2016 WK_{25}	—	December 27, 2006	Mount Lemmon	Mount Lemmon Survey	·	2.6 km	MPC · JPL
697163	2016 WU_{27}	—	September 12, 2016	Mount Lemmon	Mount Lemmon Survey	·	2.0 km	MPC · JPL
697164	2016 WB_{32}	—	November 24, 2016	Mount Lemmon	Mount Lemmon Survey	·	1.9 km	MPC · JPL
697165	2016 WC_{32}	—	November 24, 2016	Mount Lemmon	Mount Lemmon Survey	EOS	1.4 km	MPC · JPL
697166	2016 WR_{32}	—	November 18, 2016	Mount Lemmon	Mount Lemmon Survey	·	2.2 km	MPC · JPL
697167	2016 WE_{34}	—	August 8, 2015	Haleakala	Pan-STARRS 2	·	2.1 km	MPC · JPL
697168	2016 WL_{35}	—	November 10, 2016	Kitt Peak	Spacewatch	EOS	1.5 km	MPC · JPL
697169	2016 WC_{38}	—	October 23, 2016	Mount Lemmon	Mount Lemmon Survey	·	1.6 km	MPC · JPL
697170	2016 WG_{41}	—	May 3, 2014	Mount Lemmon	Mount Lemmon Survey	·	2.6 km	MPC · JPL
697171	2016 WY_{43}	—	May 7, 2014	Haleakala	Pan-STARRS 1	·	2.2 km	MPC · JPL
697172	2016 WL_{45}	—	June 17, 2015	Haleakala	Pan-STARRS 1	EOS	1.9 km	MPC · JPL
697173	2016 WO_{46}	—	November 4, 2016	Haleakala	Pan-STARRS 1	·	2.0 km	MPC · JPL
697174	2016 WJ_{48}	—	October 26, 2016	Haleakala	Pan-STARRS 1	EOS	1.5 km	MPC · JPL
697175	2016 WT_{50}	—	November 4, 2005	Kitt Peak	Spacewatch	LIX	2.5 km	MPC · JPL
697176	2016 WH_{58}	—	October 31, 2005	Kitt Peak	Spacewatch	EUP	3.5 km	MPC · JPL
697177	2016 WR_{60}	—	November 11, 2016	Mount Lemmon	Mount Lemmon Survey	EOS	1.4 km	MPC · JPL
697178	2016 WE_{61}	—	November 28, 2016	Haleakala	Pan-STARRS 1	·	2.1 km	MPC · JPL
697179	2016 WR_{62}	—	November 19, 2016	Mount Lemmon	Mount Lemmon Survey	JUN	660 m	MPC · JPL
697180	2016 WS_{62}	—	November 23, 2016	Mount Lemmon	Mount Lemmon Survey	BRA	1.4 km	MPC · JPL
697181	2016 WW_{63}	—	November 20, 2016	Mount Lemmon	Mount Lemmon Survey	EOS	1.6 km	MPC · JPL
697182	2016 WT_{69}	—	November 25, 2016	Mount Lemmon	Mount Lemmon Survey	·	1.7 km	MPC · JPL
697183	2016 WJ_{72}	—	November 28, 2016	Haleakala	Pan-STARRS 1	·	2.1 km	MPC · JPL
697184	2016 WL_{75}	—	October 29, 2016	Mount Lemmon	Mount Lemmon Survey	VER	2.3 km	MPC · JPL
697185	2016 WU_{76}	—	November 18, 2016	Mount Lemmon	Mount Lemmon Survey	·	1.9 km	MPC · JPL
697186	2016 WA_{78}	—	November 25, 2016	Mount Lemmon	Mount Lemmon Survey	·	2.1 km	MPC · JPL
697187	2016 WB_{78}	—	November 19, 2016	Mount Lemmon	Mount Lemmon Survey	·	2.3 km	MPC · JPL
697188	2016 WB_{80}	—	November 24, 2016	Haleakala	Pan-STARRS 1	·	2.6 km	MPC · JPL
697189	2016 WL_{81}	—	November 2, 2010	Mount Lemmon	Mount Lemmon Survey	·	2.3 km	MPC · JPL
697190	2016 WA_{83}	—	November 25, 2016	Mount Lemmon	Mount Lemmon Survey	EOS	1.1 km	MPC · JPL
697191	2016 WB_{85}	—	November 28, 2016	Haleakala	Pan-STARRS 1	·	2.7 km	MPC · JPL
697192	2016 WC_{85}	—	November 20, 2016	Mount Lemmon	Mount Lemmon Survey	·	2.1 km	MPC · JPL
697193	2016 XS	—	November 6, 2005	Mount Lemmon	Mount Lemmon Survey	·	2.4 km	MPC · JPL
697194	2016 XE_{3}	—	October 17, 2010	Mount Lemmon	Mount Lemmon Survey	·	2.5 km	MPC · JPL
697195	2016 XB_{6}	—	August 31, 2005	Kitt Peak	Spacewatch	·	1.1 km	MPC · JPL
697196	2016 XF_{9}	—	December 4, 2016	Mount Lemmon	Mount Lemmon Survey	·	1.8 km	MPC · JPL
697197	2016 XZ_{9}	—	August 29, 2005	Kitt Peak	Spacewatch	·	1.7 km	MPC · JPL
697198	2016 XA_{11}	—	December 6, 2011	Haleakala	Pan-STARRS 1	·	2.0 km	MPC · JPL
697199	2016 XN_{11}	—	December 4, 2016	Mount Lemmon	Mount Lemmon Survey	·	1.6 km	MPC · JPL
697200	2016 XT_{11}	—	October 18, 2006	Kitt Peak	Spacewatch	·	610 m	MPC · JPL

== 697201–697300 ==
back to top

Designation			Discovery			Properties		Ref
Permanent	Provisional	Named after	Date	Site	Discoverer(s)	Category	Diam.	Ref
697201	2016 XD_{12}	—	December 4, 2016	Kitt Peak	Spacewatch	·	2.4 km	MPC · JPL
697202	2016 XQ_{12}	—	February 20, 2009	Mount Lemmon	Mount Lemmon Survey	·	1.7 km	MPC · JPL
697203	2016 XY_{14}	—	November 30, 2005	Mount Lemmon	Mount Lemmon Survey	·	1.9 km	MPC · JPL
697204	2016 XY_{16}	—	September 14, 2007	Mount Lemmon	Mount Lemmon Survey	·	1.2 km	MPC · JPL
697205	2016 XW_{24}	—	October 9, 2010	Mount Lemmon	Mount Lemmon Survey	EOS	2.0 km	MPC · JPL
697206	2016 XF_{25}	—	December 4, 2016	Mount Lemmon	Mount Lemmon Survey	LIX	2.7 km	MPC · JPL
697207	2016 XR_{26}	—	December 4, 2016	Mount Lemmon	Mount Lemmon Survey	·	2.2 km	MPC · JPL
697208	2016 XJ_{32}	—	December 1, 2016	Mount Lemmon	Mount Lemmon Survey	·	2.7 km	MPC · JPL
697209	2016 XE_{33}	—	December 8, 2016	Mount Lemmon	Mount Lemmon Survey	·	2.7 km	MPC · JPL
697210	2016 XG_{33}	—	December 1, 2016	Mount Lemmon	Mount Lemmon Survey	EOS	1.3 km	MPC · JPL
697211	2016 XN_{34}	—	July 27, 2015	Haleakala	Pan-STARRS 1	·	2.6 km	MPC · JPL
697212	2016 XW_{35}	—	December 5, 2016	Mount Lemmon	Mount Lemmon Survey	EOS	1.4 km	MPC · JPL
697213	2016 XY_{35}	—	December 9, 2016	Mount Lemmon	Mount Lemmon Survey	·	2.3 km	MPC · JPL
697214	2016 XD_{36}	—	December 4, 2016	Mount Lemmon	Mount Lemmon Survey	·	1.2 km	MPC · JPL
697215	2016 XA_{37}	—	December 1, 2016	Mount Lemmon	Mount Lemmon Survey	·	2.4 km	MPC · JPL
697216	2016 YG_{2}	—	November 2, 2010	Mount Lemmon	Mount Lemmon Survey	·	2.6 km	MPC · JPL
697217	2016 YN_{2}	—	April 24, 1998	Mauna Kea	Veillet, C.	EOS	1.6 km	MPC · JPL
697218	2016 YW_{8}	—	November 28, 2006	Mount Lemmon	Mount Lemmon Survey	·	1.6 km	MPC · JPL
697219	2016 YA_{9}	—	December 1, 2016	Mount Lemmon	Mount Lemmon Survey	·	1.5 km	MPC · JPL
697220	2016 YQ_{11}	—	January 23, 2006	Catalina	CSS	THB	2.8 km	MPC · JPL
697221	2016 YW_{12}	—	March 29, 2012	Haleakala	Pan-STARRS 1	THB	2.6 km	MPC · JPL
697222	2016 YJ_{17}	—	December 23, 2016	Haleakala	Pan-STARRS 1	·	2.4 km	MPC · JPL
697223	2016 YZ_{17}	—	December 23, 2016	Haleakala	Pan-STARRS 1	·	2.6 km	MPC · JPL
697224	2016 YW_{18}	—	December 27, 2016	Mount Lemmon	Mount Lemmon Survey	·	2.4 km	MPC · JPL
697225	2016 YH_{20}	—	December 24, 2016	Mount Lemmon	Mount Lemmon Survey	·	4.2 km	MPC · JPL
697226	2016 YW_{20}	—	December 24, 2016	Haleakala	Pan-STARRS 1	·	2.4 km	MPC · JPL
697227	2016 YX_{20}	—	December 23, 2016	Haleakala	Pan-STARRS 1	·	2.2 km	MPC · JPL
697228	2016 YC_{21}	—	December 27, 2016	Mount Lemmon	Mount Lemmon Survey	·	460 m	MPC · JPL
697229	2016 YH_{21}	—	December 23, 2016	Haleakala	Pan-STARRS 1	ELF	2.6 km	MPC · JPL
697230	2016 YL_{27}	—	June 17, 2013	Cerro Tololo	DECam	·	2.5 km	MPC · JPL
697231	2016 YC_{28}	—	December 23, 2016	Haleakala	Pan-STARRS 1	·	2.5 km	MPC · JPL
697232	2016 YE_{30}	—	December 22, 2016	Haleakala	Pan-STARRS 1	·	2.3 km	MPC · JPL
697233	2016 YX_{30}	—	December 27, 2016	Mount Lemmon	Mount Lemmon Survey	·	2.3 km	MPC · JPL
697234	2016 YZ_{30}	—	December 23, 2016	Haleakala	Pan-STARRS 1	·	2.4 km	MPC · JPL
697235	2016 YF_{34}	—	December 29, 2016	Oukaïmeden	C. Rinner	T_{j} (2.99) · (895)	3.3 km	MPC · JPL
697236	2017 AE_{1}	—	September 12, 2015	Haleakala	Pan-STARRS 1	·	2.7 km	MPC · JPL
697237	2017 AH_{1}	—	September 12, 2015	Haleakala	Pan-STARRS 1	·	2.1 km	MPC · JPL
697238	2017 AM_{2}	—	October 8, 2015	Haleakala	Pan-STARRS 1	·	2.3 km	MPC · JPL
697239	2017 AP_{2}	—	November 7, 2015	Mount Lemmon	Mount Lemmon Survey	EOS	1.5 km	MPC · JPL
697240	2017 AQ_{2}	—	June 29, 2014	Mount Lemmon	Mount Lemmon Survey	·	2.8 km	MPC · JPL
697241	2017 AU_{6}	—	April 8, 2003	Kitt Peak	Spacewatch	·	1.7 km	MPC · JPL
697242	2017 AK_{9}	—	July 24, 2015	Haleakala	Pan-STARRS 1	·	2.3 km	MPC · JPL
697243	2017 AH_{10}	—	January 3, 2017	Haleakala	Pan-STARRS 1	·	3.3 km	MPC · JPL
697244	2017 AG_{12}	—	March 24, 2006	Mount Lemmon	Mount Lemmon Survey	NYS	1.1 km	MPC · JPL
697245	2017 AG_{14}	—	November 2, 2010	Mount Lemmon	Mount Lemmon Survey	·	1.8 km	MPC · JPL
697246	2017 AK_{14}	—	October 9, 2015	XuYi	PMO NEO Survey Program	EOS	1.7 km	MPC · JPL
697247	2017 AH_{16}	—	December 4, 2010	Mount Lemmon	Mount Lemmon Survey	·	2.4 km	MPC · JPL
697248	2017 AL_{16}	—	August 21, 2015	Haleakala	Pan-STARRS 1	EOS	1.7 km	MPC · JPL
697249	2017 AY_{16}	—	August 28, 2014	Haleakala	Pan-STARRS 1	ELF	2.6 km	MPC · JPL
697250	2017 AD_{17}	—	December 11, 2009	Mount Lemmon	Mount Lemmon Survey	·	860 m	MPC · JPL
697251	2017 AY_{17}	—	April 19, 2013	Haleakala	Pan-STARRS 1	EOS	1.6 km	MPC · JPL
697252	2017 AW_{19}	—	November 8, 2016	Haleakala	Pan-STARRS 1	·	2.7 km	MPC · JPL
697253	2017 AT_{21}	—	February 12, 2008	Kitt Peak	Spacewatch	·	1.7 km	MPC · JPL
697254	2017 AF_{24}	—	July 4, 2014	Haleakala	Pan-STARRS 1	EUP	3.2 km	MPC · JPL
697255	2017 AD_{34}	—	January 3, 2017	Haleakala	Pan-STARRS 1	·	2.1 km	MPC · JPL
697256	2017 AF_{35}	—	January 3, 2017	Haleakala	Pan-STARRS 1	L5	6.0 km	MPC · JPL
697257	2017 AQ_{35}	—	January 5, 2017	Mount Lemmon	Mount Lemmon Survey	·	2.7 km	MPC · JPL
697258	2017 AV_{35}	—	January 5, 2017	Mount Lemmon	Mount Lemmon Survey	·	3.1 km	MPC · JPL
697259	2017 AW_{35}	—	January 7, 2017	Mount Lemmon	Mount Lemmon Survey	·	2.6 km	MPC · JPL
697260	2017 AY_{36}	—	January 7, 2017	Mount Lemmon	Mount Lemmon Survey	·	2.2 km	MPC · JPL
697261	2017 AC_{37}	—	January 3, 2017	Haleakala	Pan-STARRS 1	·	2.4 km	MPC · JPL
697262	2017 AS_{42}	—	January 2, 2017	Haleakala	Pan-STARRS 1	T_{j} (2.99)	2.6 km	MPC · JPL
697263	2017 AB_{46}	—	October 24, 2005	Mauna Kea	A. Boattini	URS	2.6 km	MPC · JPL
697264	2017 AK_{46}	—	January 3, 2017	Haleakala	Pan-STARRS 1	VER	2.0 km	MPC · JPL
697265	2017 AR_{46}	—	January 2, 2017	Haleakala	Pan-STARRS 1	·	590 m	MPC · JPL
697266	2017 AZ_{47}	—	January 2, 2017	Haleakala	Pan-STARRS 1	·	2.3 km	MPC · JPL
697267	2017 AO_{49}	—	January 4, 2017	Haleakala	Pan-STARRS 1	·	2.6 km	MPC · JPL
697268	2017 AW_{49}	—	January 5, 2017	Mount Lemmon	Mount Lemmon Survey	·	2.3 km	MPC · JPL
697269	2017 AQ_{51}	—	January 3, 2017	Haleakala	Pan-STARRS 1	·	2.4 km	MPC · JPL
697270	2017 AR_{52}	—	January 7, 2017	Mount Lemmon	Mount Lemmon Survey	·	2.3 km	MPC · JPL
697271	2017 BH_{2}	—	January 20, 2008	Kitt Peak	Spacewatch	·	1.5 km	MPC · JPL
697272	2017 BN_{4}	—	August 21, 2015	Haleakala	Pan-STARRS 1	·	1.7 km	MPC · JPL
697273	2017 BC_{5}	—	January 24, 2007	Kitt Peak	Spacewatch	·	550 m	MPC · JPL
697274	2017 BD_{7}	—	October 2, 2015	Haleakala	Pan-STARRS 1	T_{j} (2.98) · EUP	3.4 km	MPC · JPL
697275	2017 BJ_{13}	—	October 17, 2010	Mount Lemmon	Mount Lemmon Survey	·	1.9 km	MPC · JPL
697276	2017 BF_{15}	—	March 20, 2001	Kitt Peak	Spacewatch	THM	2.3 km	MPC · JPL
697277	2017 BJ_{16}	—	January 19, 2012	Haleakala	Pan-STARRS 1	·	2.4 km	MPC · JPL
697278	2017 BA_{17}	—	February 26, 2012	Haleakala	Pan-STARRS 1	·	2.5 km	MPC · JPL
697279	2017 BM_{17}	—	September 30, 2005	Mauna Kea	A. Boattini	·	3.6 km	MPC · JPL
697280	2017 BM_{18}	—	January 26, 2017	Mount Lemmon	Mount Lemmon Survey	·	480 m	MPC · JPL
697281	2017 BR_{20}	—	January 26, 2006	Mount Lemmon	Mount Lemmon Survey	·	2.1 km	MPC · JPL
697282	2017 BZ_{20}	—	January 26, 2017	Mount Lemmon	Mount Lemmon Survey	·	1.8 km	MPC · JPL
697283	2017 BA_{22}	—	January 30, 2006	Kitt Peak	Spacewatch	HYG	2.0 km	MPC · JPL
697284	2017 BQ_{23}	—	January 13, 2008	Kitt Peak	Spacewatch	NEM	1.7 km	MPC · JPL
697285	2017 BX_{23}	—	June 20, 2014	Haleakala	Pan-STARRS 1	·	2.5 km	MPC · JPL
697286	2017 BP_{26}	—	November 20, 2006	Kitt Peak	Spacewatch	·	1.4 km	MPC · JPL
697287	2017 BH_{27}	—	January 7, 2006	Kitt Peak	Spacewatch	·	2.3 km	MPC · JPL
697288	2017 BS_{33}	—	June 27, 2014	Haleakala	Pan-STARRS 1	·	3.0 km	MPC · JPL
697289	2017 BD_{34}	—	August 28, 2014	Haleakala	Pan-STARRS 1	(1118)	2.7 km	MPC · JPL
697290	2017 BB_{35}	—	November 16, 2006	Mount Lemmon	Mount Lemmon Survey	(13314)	1.6 km	MPC · JPL
697291	2017 BZ_{35}	—	November 30, 2010	Mount Lemmon	Mount Lemmon Survey	·	2.5 km	MPC · JPL
697292	2017 BO_{38}	—	September 17, 2009	Kitt Peak	Spacewatch	·	410 m	MPC · JPL
697293	2017 BA_{39}	—	January 26, 2007	Kitt Peak	Spacewatch	·	1.5 km	MPC · JPL
697294	2017 BH_{40}	—	July 30, 2014	Haleakala	Pan-STARRS 1	·	2.7 km	MPC · JPL
697295	2017 BR_{40}	—	March 15, 2004	Kitt Peak	Spacewatch	NEM	1.9 km	MPC · JPL
697296	2017 BU_{40}	—	February 28, 2014	Haleakala	Pan-STARRS 1	NYS	1.4 km	MPC · JPL
697297	2017 BA_{41}	—	July 28, 2005	Palomar	NEAT	·	580 m	MPC · JPL
697298	2017 BA_{42}	—	November 3, 2000	Kitt Peak	Spacewatch	·	850 m	MPC · JPL
697299	2017 BH_{42}	—	July 7, 2005	Mauna Kea	Veillet, C.	AGN	1.0 km	MPC · JPL
697300	2017 BM_{42}	—	September 11, 2004	Kitt Peak	Spacewatch	·	2.2 km	MPC · JPL

== 697301–697400 ==
back to top

Designation			Discovery			Properties		Ref
Permanent	Provisional	Named after	Date	Site	Discoverer(s)	Category	Diam.	Ref
697301	2017 BK_{44}	—	October 12, 2015	Haleakala	Pan-STARRS 1	·	580 m	MPC · JPL
697302	2017 BP_{45}	—	February 4, 2006	Catalina	CSS	·	3.1 km	MPC · JPL
697303	2017 BY_{45}	—	December 1, 2005	Kitt Peak	Spacewatch	·	2.3 km	MPC · JPL
697304	2017 BC_{46}	—	July 29, 2014	Haleakala	Pan-STARRS 1	EOS	1.6 km	MPC · JPL
697305	2017 BP_{46}	—	October 18, 2011	Mount Lemmon	Mount Lemmon Survey	·	1.6 km	MPC · JPL
697306	2017 BW_{47}	—	November 2, 2007	Kitt Peak	Spacewatch	·	1.4 km	MPC · JPL
697307	2017 BL_{48}	—	July 25, 2014	Haleakala	Pan-STARRS 1	·	2.2 km	MPC · JPL
697308	2017 BL_{49}	—	February 13, 2008	Kitt Peak	Spacewatch	AGN	1.1 km	MPC · JPL
697309	2017 BB_{51}	—	December 27, 2011	Mount Lemmon	Mount Lemmon Survey	KOR	1.1 km	MPC · JPL
697310	2017 BL_{53}	—	August 22, 2014	Haleakala	Pan-STARRS 1	VER	2.4 km	MPC · JPL
697311	2017 BS_{54}	—	September 28, 2009	Mount Lemmon	Mount Lemmon Survey	·	640 m	MPC · JPL
697312	2017 BZ_{55}	—	October 18, 2003	Kitt Peak	Spacewatch	(5)	1.1 km	MPC · JPL
697313	2017 BO_{57}	—	January 9, 2006	Kitt Peak	Spacewatch	EOS	1.9 km	MPC · JPL
697314	2017 BE_{58}	—	April 19, 2013	Haleakala	Pan-STARRS 1	·	2.4 km	MPC · JPL
697315	2017 BM_{58}	—	September 1, 2013	Mount Lemmon	Mount Lemmon Survey	3:2	4.8 km	MPC · JPL
697316	2017 BS_{61}	—	March 9, 2007	Kitt Peak	Spacewatch	·	2.1 km	MPC · JPL
697317	2017 BS_{65}	—	December 5, 1999	Kitt Peak	Spacewatch	EOS	1.7 km	MPC · JPL
697318	2017 BB_{66}	—	December 10, 2004	Kitt Peak	Spacewatch	VER	2.5 km	MPC · JPL
697319	2017 BT_{67}	—	June 30, 2014	Haleakala	Pan-STARRS 1	·	2.3 km	MPC · JPL
697320	2017 BM_{68}	—	March 4, 2013	Haleakala	Pan-STARRS 1	WIT	940 m	MPC · JPL
697321	2017 BR_{69}	—	October 13, 2015	Haleakala	Pan-STARRS 1	·	1.9 km	MPC · JPL
697322	2017 BQ_{71}	—	September 23, 2015	Haleakala	Pan-STARRS 1	EOS	1.4 km	MPC · JPL
697323	2017 BQ_{72}	—	February 6, 2013	Kitt Peak	Spacewatch	·	1.5 km	MPC · JPL
697324	2017 BP_{75}	—	May 15, 2013	Haleakala	Pan-STARRS 1	·	2.5 km	MPC · JPL
697325	2017 BT_{75}	—	January 20, 2017	Bergisch Gladbach	W. Bickel	·	2.0 km	MPC · JPL
697326	2017 BY_{75}	—	May 3, 2008	Kitt Peak	Spacewatch	·	2.2 km	MPC · JPL
697327	2017 BF_{77}	—	June 24, 2014	Haleakala	Pan-STARRS 1	VER	2.5 km	MPC · JPL
697328	2017 BW_{77}	—	January 27, 2017	Haleakala	Pan-STARRS 1	BAP	500 m	MPC · JPL
697329	2017 BG_{79}	—	March 25, 2007	Mount Lemmon	Mount Lemmon Survey	·	2.6 km	MPC · JPL
697330	2017 BD_{80}	—	November 7, 2005	Mauna Kea	A. Boattini	·	3.0 km	MPC · JPL
697331	2017 BL_{84}	—	August 22, 2004	Kitt Peak	Spacewatch	EMA	3.0 km	MPC · JPL
697332	2017 BB_{97}	—	July 29, 2014	Haleakala	Pan-STARRS 1	ELF	2.8 km	MPC · JPL
697333	2017 BF_{97}	—	July 19, 2015	Haleakala	Pan-STARRS 1	·	1.9 km	MPC · JPL
697334	2017 BC_{98}	—	March 25, 2012	Mount Lemmon	Mount Lemmon Survey	·	2.4 km	MPC · JPL
697335	2017 BU_{99}	—	January 8, 2017	Mount Lemmon	Mount Lemmon Survey	·	1.9 km	MPC · JPL
697336	2017 BK_{100}	—	March 13, 2012	Mount Lemmon	Mount Lemmon Survey	THM	1.8 km	MPC · JPL
697337	2017 BP_{100}	—	March 8, 2008	Mount Lemmon	Mount Lemmon Survey	·	1.6 km	MPC · JPL
697338	2017 BM_{101}	—	March 15, 2012	Mount Lemmon	Mount Lemmon Survey	·	1.9 km	MPC · JPL
697339	2017 BA_{102}	—	March 2, 2011	Mount Lemmon	Mount Lemmon Survey	·	2.5 km	MPC · JPL
697340	2017 BN_{102}	—	November 4, 2010	Mount Lemmon	Mount Lemmon Survey	·	2.1 km	MPC · JPL
697341	2017 BK_{106}	—	October 22, 2006	Catalina	CSS	·	1.9 km	MPC · JPL
697342	2017 BM_{106}	—	November 29, 2005	Mount Lemmon	Mount Lemmon Survey	·	2.5 km	MPC · JPL
697343	2017 BY_{106}	—	October 15, 2007	Mount Lemmon	Mount Lemmon Survey	EUN	1.1 km	MPC · JPL
697344	2017 BC_{107}	—	October 10, 2015	Haleakala	Pan-STARRS 1	·	1.8 km	MPC · JPL
697345	2017 BV_{107}	—	September 17, 2009	Mount Lemmon	Mount Lemmon Survey	·	2.8 km	MPC · JPL
697346	2017 BS_{108}	—	December 23, 2016	Haleakala	Pan-STARRS 1	·	1.9 km	MPC · JPL
697347	2017 BT_{114}	—	March 26, 2007	Mount Lemmon	Mount Lemmon Survey	·	1.9 km	MPC · JPL
697348	2017 BX_{114}	—	October 9, 2005	Kitt Peak	Spacewatch	·	1.5 km	MPC · JPL
697349	2017 BB_{115}	—	January 26, 2017	Haleakala	Pan-STARRS 1	·	2.2 km	MPC · JPL
697350	2017 BN_{116}	—	April 18, 2012	Mount Lemmon	Mount Lemmon Survey	·	2.4 km	MPC · JPL
697351	2017 BE_{118}	—	January 14, 2011	Mount Lemmon	Mount Lemmon Survey	·	3.3 km	MPC · JPL
697352	2017 BU_{118}	—	December 17, 2007	Mount Lemmon	Mount Lemmon Survey	·	1.5 km	MPC · JPL
697353	2017 BV_{118}	—	February 9, 2011	Mount Lemmon	Mount Lemmon Survey	(1118)	2.6 km	MPC · JPL
697354	2017 BX_{118}	—	July 13, 2013	Haleakala	Pan-STARRS 1	·	2.7 km	MPC · JPL
697355	2017 BA_{119}	—	February 17, 2013	Kitt Peak	Spacewatch	·	1.2 km	MPC · JPL
697356	2017 BP_{119}	—	May 12, 2007	Mount Lemmon	Mount Lemmon Survey	·	2.9 km	MPC · JPL
697357	2017 BB_{121}	—	February 28, 2012	Haleakala	Pan-STARRS 1	ELF	2.8 km	MPC · JPL
697358	2017 BO_{121}	—	February 28, 2014	Haleakala	Pan-STARRS 1	·	430 m	MPC · JPL
697359	2017 BD_{125}	—	January 28, 2017	Haleakala	Pan-STARRS 1	LUT	3.3 km	MPC · JPL
697360	2017 BV_{126}	—	August 15, 2009	Kitt Peak	Spacewatch	·	2.4 km	MPC · JPL
697361	2017 BC_{127}	—	March 15, 2012	Mount Lemmon	Mount Lemmon Survey	·	3.1 km	MPC · JPL
697362	2017 BQ_{128}	—	September 1, 2011	Bergisch Gladbach	W. Bickel	·	1.0 km	MPC · JPL
697363	2017 BJ_{129}	—	January 4, 2017	Haleakala	Pan-STARRS 1	·	2.6 km	MPC · JPL
697364	2017 BW_{130}	—	March 23, 2006	Mount Lemmon	Mount Lemmon Survey	·	2.4 km	MPC · JPL
697365	2017 BK_{133}	—	October 7, 2005	Mauna Kea	A. Boattini	EOS	1.7 km	MPC · JPL
697366	2017 BA_{134}	—	July 29, 2014	Haleakala	Pan-STARRS 1	·	1.7 km	MPC · JPL
697367	2017 BL_{134}	—	October 9, 2015	Haleakala	Pan-STARRS 1	·	2.1 km	MPC · JPL
697368	2017 BP_{134}	—	April 5, 2014	Haleakala	Pan-STARRS 1	V	390 m	MPC · JPL
697369	2017 BX_{134}	—	March 24, 2014	Haleakala	Pan-STARRS 1	·	540 m	MPC · JPL
697370	2017 BG_{135}	—	October 16, 2009	Mount Lemmon	Mount Lemmon Survey	·	2.1 km	MPC · JPL
697371	2017 BH_{135}	—	January 31, 2006	Kitt Peak	Spacewatch	EOS	1.7 km	MPC · JPL
697372	2017 BU_{136}	—	January 16, 2011	Mount Lemmon	Mount Lemmon Survey	·	2.5 km	MPC · JPL
697373	2017 BB_{137}	—	August 3, 2014	Haleakala	Pan-STARRS 1	·	1.8 km	MPC · JPL
697374	2017 BF_{137}	—	January 8, 2011	Mount Lemmon	Mount Lemmon Survey	·	2.7 km	MPC · JPL
697375	2017 BR_{137}	—	October 9, 2007	Mount Lemmon	Mount Lemmon Survey	·	1.1 km	MPC · JPL
697376	2017 BF_{138}	—	April 13, 2012	Haleakala	Pan-STARRS 1	·	2.1 km	MPC · JPL
697377	2017 BN_{138}	—	February 24, 2006	Kitt Peak	Spacewatch	·	2.5 km	MPC · JPL
697378	2017 BK_{140}	—	January 19, 2012	Haleakala	Pan-STARRS 1	·	1.5 km	MPC · JPL
697379	2017 BC_{141}	—	February 5, 2011	Haleakala	Pan-STARRS 1	·	3.2 km	MPC · JPL
697380	2017 BO_{147}	—	January 28, 2017	Haleakala	Pan-STARRS 1	T_{j} (2.98) · EUP	2.5 km	MPC · JPL
697381	2017 BR_{152}	—	January 29, 2017	Haleakala	Pan-STARRS 1	·	2.8 km	MPC · JPL
697382	2017 BF_{155}	—	January 27, 2017	Haleakala	Pan-STARRS 1	·	540 m	MPC · JPL
697383	2017 BO_{155}	—	January 28, 2017	Haleakala	Pan-STARRS 1	·	440 m	MPC · JPL
697384	2017 BN_{160}	—	January 29, 2017	Kitt Peak	Spacewatch	·	1.6 km	MPC · JPL
697385	2017 BW_{160}	—	January 26, 2017	Mount Lemmon	Mount Lemmon Survey	·	2.0 km	MPC · JPL
697386	2017 BH_{163}	—	January 27, 2017	Haleakala	Pan-STARRS 1	·	2.4 km	MPC · JPL
697387	2017 BM_{163}	—	August 31, 2014	Haleakala	Pan-STARRS 1	VER	2.0 km	MPC · JPL
697388	2017 BU_{164}	—	January 4, 2017	Haleakala	Pan-STARRS 1	EUP	2.3 km	MPC · JPL
697389	2017 BD_{165}	—	January 26, 2017	Mount Lemmon	Mount Lemmon Survey	·	2.3 km	MPC · JPL
697390	2017 BJ_{166}	—	January 31, 2017	Haleakala	Pan-STARRS 1	·	500 m	MPC · JPL
697391	2017 BD_{167}	—	January 30, 2017	Mount Lemmon	Mount Lemmon Survey	·	3.1 km	MPC · JPL
697392	2017 BK_{168}	—	January 29, 2017	Haleakala	Pan-STARRS 1	BRA	950 m	MPC · JPL
697393	2017 BW_{178}	—	January 29, 2017	Haleakala	Pan-STARRS 1	·	2.5 km	MPC · JPL
697394	2017 BX_{180}	—	January 31, 2017	Haleakala	Pan-STARRS 1	·	550 m	MPC · JPL
697395	2017 BG_{182}	—	January 3, 2017	Haleakala	Pan-STARRS 1	·	2.2 km	MPC · JPL
697396	2017 BR_{185}	—	January 31, 2006	Kitt Peak	Spacewatch	THM	1.8 km	MPC · JPL
697397	2017 BM_{189}	—	January 16, 2017	Haleakala	Pan-STARRS 1	·	450 m	MPC · JPL
697398	2017 BH_{211}	—	January 30, 2017	Haleakala	Pan-STARRS 1	·	570 m	MPC · JPL
697399	2017 BS_{211}	—	January 27, 2017	Haleakala	Pan-STARRS 1	·	1.4 km	MPC · JPL
697400	2017 BU_{211}	—	January 26, 2017	Haleakala	Pan-STARRS 1	·	590 m	MPC · JPL

== 697401–697500 ==
back to top

Designation			Discovery			Properties		Ref
Permanent	Provisional	Named after	Date	Site	Discoverer(s)	Category	Diam.	Ref
697401	2017 BU_{212}	—	March 10, 2007	Kitt Peak	Spacewatch	·	500 m	MPC · JPL
697402 Ao	2017 BX_{232}	Ao	January 23, 2017	Mauna Kea	Mauna Kea	·	2.1 km	MPC · JPL
697403	2017 CN_{3}	—	February 4, 2006	Mount Lemmon	Mount Lemmon Survey	·	2.0 km	MPC · JPL
697404	2017 CW_{5}	—	September 18, 2009	Kitt Peak	Spacewatch	·	2.5 km	MPC · JPL
697405	2017 CY_{5}	—	January 10, 2011	Mount Lemmon	Mount Lemmon Survey	·	3.2 km	MPC · JPL
697406	2017 CG_{9}	—	February 25, 2006	Kitt Peak	Spacewatch	·	3.0 km	MPC · JPL
697407	2017 CP_{9}	—	January 27, 2017	Haleakala	Pan-STARRS 1	·	500 m	MPC · JPL
697408	2017 CT_{11}	—	April 25, 2007	Mount Lemmon	Mount Lemmon Survey	·	3.4 km	MPC · JPL
697409	2017 CD_{16}	—	March 7, 2014	Mount Lemmon	Mount Lemmon Survey	·	1.3 km	MPC · JPL
697410	2017 CM_{16}	—	October 25, 2005	Kitt Peak	Spacewatch	KOR	1.3 km	MPC · JPL
697411	2017 CN_{16}	—	February 26, 2012	Kitt Peak	Spacewatch	HYG	2.6 km	MPC · JPL
697412	2017 CU_{18}	—	July 25, 2014	Haleakala	Pan-STARRS 1	VER	2.2 km	MPC · JPL
697413	2017 CZ_{19}	—	October 11, 2012	Haleakala	Pan-STARRS 1	·	500 m	MPC · JPL
697414	2017 CQ_{20}	—	July 25, 2014	Haleakala	Pan-STARRS 1	·	2.0 km	MPC · JPL
697415	2017 CH_{22}	—	January 28, 2017	Haleakala	Pan-STARRS 1	·	500 m	MPC · JPL
697416	2017 CS_{23}	—	September 7, 2008	Mount Lemmon	Mount Lemmon Survey	THM	2.0 km	MPC · JPL
697417	2017 CC_{24}	—	October 27, 2005	Kitt Peak	Spacewatch	KOR	1.3 km	MPC · JPL
697418	2017 CU_{24}	—	March 24, 2014	Haleakala	Pan-STARRS 1	·	530 m	MPC · JPL
697419	2017 CY_{25}	—	August 28, 2006	Kitt Peak	Spacewatch	·	810 m	MPC · JPL
697420	2017 CB_{27}	—	August 3, 2014	Haleakala	Pan-STARRS 1	·	2.4 km	MPC · JPL
697421	2017 CH_{27}	—	February 28, 2008	Mount Lemmon	Mount Lemmon Survey	·	1.6 km	MPC · JPL
697422	2017 CP_{28}	—	November 17, 2006	Mount Lemmon	Mount Lemmon Survey	AGN	1.0 km	MPC · JPL
697423	2017 CA_{29}	—	May 23, 2014	Haleakala	Pan-STARRS 1	·	550 m	MPC · JPL
697424	2017 CF_{31}	—	November 11, 2009	Kitt Peak	Spacewatch	·	630 m	MPC · JPL
697425	2017 CH_{33}	—	March 24, 2014	Haleakala	Pan-STARRS 1	·	530 m	MPC · JPL
697426	2017 CT_{33}	—	July 1, 2014	Haleakala	Pan-STARRS 1	·	2.8 km	MPC · JPL
697427	2017 CF_{34}	—	May 7, 2014	Haleakala	Pan-STARRS 1	·	530 m	MPC · JPL
697428	2017 CP_{34}	—	November 28, 2005	Mount Lemmon	Mount Lemmon Survey	·	2.1 km	MPC · JPL
697429	2017 CR_{34}	—	September 19, 2003	Kitt Peak	Spacewatch	·	2.5 km	MPC · JPL
697430	2017 CG_{38}	—	February 2, 2017	Haleakala	Pan-STARRS 1	·	550 m	MPC · JPL
697431	2017 CX_{41}	—	February 1, 2017	Mount Lemmon	Mount Lemmon Survey	·	1.4 km	MPC · JPL
697432	2017 CP_{46}	—	February 4, 2017	Haleakala	Pan-STARRS 1	EOS	1.6 km	MPC · JPL
697433	2017 CY_{48}	—	February 3, 2017	Haleakala	Pan-STARRS 1	·	520 m	MPC · JPL
697434	2017 DV	—	February 23, 2007	Kitt Peak	Spacewatch	·	720 m	MPC · JPL
697435	2017 DD_{1}	—	January 27, 2017	Haleakala	Pan-STARRS 1	·	1.3 km	MPC · JPL
697436	2017 DR_{2}	—	January 27, 2007	Kitt Peak	Spacewatch	·	590 m	MPC · JPL
697437	2017 DU_{3}	—	October 10, 2015	Haleakala	Pan-STARRS 1	·	3.1 km	MPC · JPL
697438	2017 DY_{4}	—	August 26, 2001	Kitt Peak	Spacewatch	·	1.5 km	MPC · JPL
697439	2017 DG_{5}	—	September 20, 2001	Kitt Peak	Spacewatch	HOF	2.4 km	MPC · JPL
697440	2017 DK_{5}	—	August 27, 2009	Kitt Peak	Spacewatch	·	1.9 km	MPC · JPL
697441	2017 DN_{6}	—	May 28, 2014	Haleakala	Pan-STARRS 1	·	520 m	MPC · JPL
697442	2017 DU_{7}	—	November 11, 2009	Mount Lemmon	Mount Lemmon Survey	URS	2.4 km	MPC · JPL
697443	2017 DY_{10}	—	October 8, 2015	Haleakala	Pan-STARRS 1	·	2.4 km	MPC · JPL
697444	2017 DD_{11}	—	December 30, 2005	Mount Lemmon	Mount Lemmon Survey	·	2.1 km	MPC · JPL
697445	2017 DN_{13}	—	November 9, 2007	Mount Lemmon	Mount Lemmon Survey	·	2.0 km	MPC · JPL
697446	2017 DS_{16}	—	December 24, 2005	Kitt Peak	Spacewatch	·	2.3 km	MPC · JPL
697447	2017 DZ_{16}	—	November 12, 2010	Mount Lemmon	Mount Lemmon Survey	·	2.1 km	MPC · JPL
697448	2017 DX_{17}	—	October 9, 2012	Haleakala	Pan-STARRS 1	·	450 m	MPC · JPL
697449	2017 DQ_{18}	—	July 28, 2009	Catalina	CSS	·	2.1 km	MPC · JPL
697450	2017 DQ_{19}	—	March 9, 2007	Mount Lemmon	Mount Lemmon Survey	·	590 m	MPC · JPL
697451	2017 DG_{20}	—	July 31, 2014	Haleakala	Pan-STARRS 1	·	2.5 km	MPC · JPL
697452	2017 DN_{20}	—	October 17, 2010	Mount Lemmon	Mount Lemmon Survey	KOR	1.1 km	MPC · JPL
697453	2017 DF_{21}	—	April 30, 2006	Kitt Peak	Spacewatch	NYS	1.1 km	MPC · JPL
697454	2017 DL_{21}	—	February 6, 2007	Mount Lemmon	Mount Lemmon Survey	·	580 m	MPC · JPL
697455	2017 DN_{24}	—	March 12, 2013	Kitt Peak	Spacewatch	·	1.2 km	MPC · JPL
697456	2017 DV_{24}	—	September 23, 2009	Kitt Peak	Spacewatch	·	2.5 km	MPC · JPL
697457	2017 DZ_{24}	—	December 6, 2012	Mount Lemmon	Mount Lemmon Survey	·	1.4 km	MPC · JPL
697458	2017 DY_{26}	—	October 9, 2008	Mount Lemmon	Mount Lemmon Survey	·	2.8 km	MPC · JPL
697459	2017 DD_{27}	—	February 18, 2017	Haleakala	Pan-STARRS 1	·	610 m	MPC · JPL
697460	2017 DW_{27}	—	January 2, 2017	Haleakala	Pan-STARRS 1	·	540 m	MPC · JPL
697461	2017 DJ_{28}	—	November 8, 2007	Kitt Peak	Spacewatch	·	1.3 km	MPC · JPL
697462	2017 DW_{28}	—	April 18, 2007	Mount Lemmon	Mount Lemmon Survey	·	1.8 km	MPC · JPL
697463	2017 DA_{29}	—	September 28, 2009	Mount Lemmon	Mount Lemmon Survey	EOS	1.5 km	MPC · JPL
697464	2017 DL_{30}	—	July 31, 2014	Haleakala	Pan-STARRS 1	·	2.8 km	MPC · JPL
697465	2017 DC_{32}	—	August 22, 2014	Haleakala	Pan-STARRS 1	EOS	1.8 km	MPC · JPL
697466	2017 DD_{32}	—	March 1, 2008	Kitt Peak	Spacewatch	·	1.8 km	MPC · JPL
697467	2017 DO_{33}	—	March 3, 2000	Kitt Peak	Spacewatch	·	2.2 km	MPC · JPL
697468	2017 DS_{33}	—	March 14, 2012	Mount Lemmon	Mount Lemmon Survey	EOS	1.6 km	MPC · JPL
697469	2017 DU_{38}	—	May 5, 2014	Haleakala	Pan-STARRS 1	·	600 m	MPC · JPL
697470	2017 DG_{40}	—	September 15, 2009	Kitt Peak	Spacewatch	EOS	1.7 km	MPC · JPL
697471	2017 DK_{40}	—	January 25, 2006	Kitt Peak	Spacewatch	·	2.2 km	MPC · JPL
697472	2017 DC_{42}	—	April 1, 2011	Kitt Peak	Spacewatch	·	680 m	MPC · JPL
697473	2017 DK_{45}	—	December 21, 2006	Kitt Peak	Spacewatch	HOF	2.6 km	MPC · JPL
697474	2017 DQ_{48}	—	February 8, 2011	Mount Lemmon	Mount Lemmon Survey	·	2.9 km	MPC · JPL
697475	2017 DC_{49}	—	January 10, 2008	Mount Lemmon	Mount Lemmon Survey	·	1.5 km	MPC · JPL
697476	2017 DH_{49}	—	March 29, 2012	Haleakala	Pan-STARRS 1	·	2.4 km	MPC · JPL
697477	2017 DR_{52}	—	January 10, 2008	Mount Lemmon	Mount Lemmon Survey	·	1.8 km	MPC · JPL
697478	2017 DG_{53}	—	July 25, 2011	Haleakala	Pan-STARRS 1	·	660 m	MPC · JPL
697479	2017 DM_{53}	—	February 9, 2010	Mount Lemmon	Mount Lemmon Survey	·	530 m	MPC · JPL
697480	2017 DF_{54}	—	July 28, 2014	Haleakala	Pan-STARRS 1	LIX	2.6 km	MPC · JPL
697481	2017 DT_{55}	—	September 28, 2009	Kitt Peak	Spacewatch	·	2.8 km	MPC · JPL
697482	2017 DA_{56}	—	June 5, 2014	Haleakala	Pan-STARRS 1	MAR	970 m	MPC · JPL
697483	2017 DD_{58}	—	August 23, 2014	Haleakala	Pan-STARRS 1	EOS	1.6 km	MPC · JPL
697484	2017 DN_{59}	—	January 8, 2011	Mount Lemmon	Mount Lemmon Survey	·	2.1 km	MPC · JPL
697485	2017 DZ_{59}	—	April 30, 2014	Haleakala	Pan-STARRS 1	·	680 m	MPC · JPL
697486	2017 DG_{62}	—	August 28, 2014	Haleakala	Pan-STARRS 1	·	3.4 km	MPC · JPL
697487	2017 DM_{63}	—	August 26, 2012	Haleakala	Pan-STARRS 1	·	550 m	MPC · JPL
697488	2017 DM_{64}	—	September 21, 2009	Mount Lemmon	Mount Lemmon Survey	·	2.3 km	MPC · JPL
697489	2017 DR_{65}	—	October 9, 2010	Mount Lemmon	Mount Lemmon Survey	KOR	1.1 km	MPC · JPL
697490	2017 DC_{67}	—	January 29, 2011	Mount Lemmon	Mount Lemmon Survey	·	2.6 km	MPC · JPL
697491	2017 DO_{68}	—	January 2, 2009	Kitt Peak	Spacewatch	·	1.3 km	MPC · JPL
697492	2017 DX_{69}	—	March 16, 2012	Mount Lemmon	Mount Lemmon Survey	·	2.0 km	MPC · JPL
697493	2017 DD_{73}	—	January 27, 2007	Kitt Peak	Spacewatch	·	600 m	MPC · JPL
697494	2017 DA_{75}	—	October 19, 2008	Kitt Peak	Spacewatch	(2076)	600 m	MPC · JPL
697495	2017 DU_{75}	—	September 26, 2006	Kitt Peak	Spacewatch	·	1.5 km	MPC · JPL
697496	2017 DC_{76}	—	June 29, 2014	Mount Lemmon	Mount Lemmon Survey	·	510 m	MPC · JPL
697497	2017 DU_{77}	—	February 23, 2003	Anderson Mesa	LONEOS	·	2.0 km	MPC · JPL
697498	2017 DF_{80}	—	December 17, 2006	7300	W. K. Y. Yeung	·	500 m	MPC · JPL
697499	2017 DL_{80}	—	December 19, 2003	Kitt Peak	Spacewatch	·	1.3 km	MPC · JPL
697500	2017 DK_{83}	—	June 29, 2014	Mount Lemmon	Mount Lemmon Survey	·	830 m	MPC · JPL

== 697501–697600 ==
back to top

Designation			Discovery			Properties		Ref
Permanent	Provisional	Named after	Date	Site	Discoverer(s)	Category	Diam.	Ref
697501	2017 DR_{84}	—	December 31, 2007	Mount Lemmon	Mount Lemmon Survey	·	1.4 km	MPC · JPL
697502	2017 DS_{86}	—	September 29, 2010	Mount Lemmon	Mount Lemmon Survey	HOF	2.0 km	MPC · JPL
697503	2017 DQ_{87}	—	January 21, 2013	Haleakala	Pan-STARRS 1	·	1.9 km	MPC · JPL
697504	2017 DT_{87}	—	March 24, 2006	Kitt Peak	Spacewatch	·	3.0 km	MPC · JPL
697505	2017 DP_{88}	—	October 4, 2006	Mount Lemmon	Mount Lemmon Survey	·	1.7 km	MPC · JPL
697506	2017 DK_{89}	—	March 23, 2006	Siding Spring	SSS	·	3.2 km	MPC · JPL
697507	2017 DX_{90}	—	November 7, 2012	Haleakala	Pan-STARRS 1	·	640 m	MPC · JPL
697508	2017 DZ_{92}	—	January 26, 2017	Haleakala	Pan-STARRS 1	EOS	1.6 km	MPC · JPL
697509	2017 DB_{93}	—	August 18, 2014	Haleakala	Pan-STARRS 1	EOS	1.5 km	MPC · JPL
697510	2017 DJ_{93}	—	June 21, 2010	Mount Lemmon	Mount Lemmon Survey	·	1.5 km	MPC · JPL
697511	2017 DZ_{93}	—	September 27, 2003	Kitt Peak	Spacewatch	·	2.6 km	MPC · JPL
697512	2017 DL_{95}	—	February 13, 2008	Kitt Peak	Spacewatch	·	1.8 km	MPC · JPL
697513	2017 DD_{96}	—	April 8, 2006	Kitt Peak	Spacewatch	·	2.7 km	MPC · JPL
697514	2017 DD_{97}	—	October 18, 2012	Haleakala	Pan-STARRS 1	·	630 m	MPC · JPL
697515	2017 DF_{97}	—	April 26, 2007	Kitt Peak	Spacewatch	·	540 m	MPC · JPL
697516	2017 DW_{97}	—	December 27, 2009	Kitt Peak	Spacewatch	·	560 m	MPC · JPL
697517	2017 DO_{99}	—	November 3, 2010	Kitt Peak	Spacewatch	·	1.9 km	MPC · JPL
697518	2017 DJ_{101}	—	October 2, 2008	Kitt Peak	Spacewatch	·	2.9 km	MPC · JPL
697519	2017 DP_{101}	—	June 15, 2007	Kitt Peak	Spacewatch	·	820 m	MPC · JPL
697520	2017 DU_{101}	—	April 30, 2014	Haleakala	Pan-STARRS 1	·	530 m	MPC · JPL
697521	2017 DN_{102}	—	October 2, 2003	Kitt Peak	Spacewatch	·	2.9 km	MPC · JPL
697522	2017 DV_{109}	—	March 13, 2012	Mount Lemmon	Mount Lemmon Survey	·	2.0 km	MPC · JPL
697523	2017 DA_{111}	—	March 14, 2004	Kitt Peak	Spacewatch	·	620 m	MPC · JPL
697524	2017 DB_{111}	—	November 20, 2009	Mount Lemmon	Mount Lemmon Survey	·	540 m	MPC · JPL
697525	2017 DW_{112}	—	April 2, 2014	Mount Lemmon	Mount Lemmon Survey	·	550 m	MPC · JPL
697526	2017 DW_{114}	—	November 8, 2009	Mount Lemmon	Mount Lemmon Survey	·	590 m	MPC · JPL
697527	2017 DB_{119}	—	January 18, 2009	Kitt Peak	Spacewatch	·	1.1 km	MPC · JPL
697528	2017 DJ_{119}	—	May 27, 2014	Mount Lemmon	Mount Lemmon Survey	·	600 m	MPC · JPL
697529	2017 DV_{120}	—	October 11, 2005	Kitt Peak	Spacewatch	·	1.6 km	MPC · JPL
697530	2017 DT_{121}	—	January 19, 2012	Haleakala	Pan-STARRS 1	·	2.0 km	MPC · JPL
697531	2017 DL_{122}	—	July 29, 2014	ESA OGS	ESA OGS	HOF	2.2 km	MPC · JPL
697532	2017 DP_{122}	—	December 24, 2006	Kitt Peak	Spacewatch	·	1.8 km	MPC · JPL
697533	2017 DE_{124}	—	February 22, 2017	Haleakala	Pan-STARRS 1	·	460 m	MPC · JPL
697534	2017 DR_{130}	—	February 21, 2017	Haleakala	Pan-STARRS 1	·	610 m	MPC · JPL
697535	2017 DW_{130}	—	February 21, 2017	Haleakala	Pan-STARRS 1	·	520 m	MPC · JPL
697536	2017 DP_{131}	—	February 25, 2017	Haleakala	Pan-STARRS 1	·	850 m	MPC · JPL
697537	2017 DH_{132}	—	February 21, 2017	Haleakala	Pan-STARRS 1	·	2.8 km	MPC · JPL
697538	2017 DT_{132}	—	February 18, 2017	Haleakala	Pan-STARRS 1	·	2.9 km	MPC · JPL
697539	2017 DK_{133}	—	February 21, 2017	Haleakala	Pan-STARRS 1	·	430 m	MPC · JPL
697540	2017 DR_{139}	—	February 21, 2017	Haleakala	Pan-STARRS 1	·	520 m	MPC · JPL
697541	2017 DS_{143}	—	February 24, 2017	Haleakala	Pan-STARRS 1	·	530 m	MPC · JPL
697542	2017 DL_{144}	—	May 7, 2014	Haleakala	Pan-STARRS 1	·	670 m	MPC · JPL
697543	2017 DN_{151}	—	February 21, 2017	Haleakala	Pan-STARRS 1	·	650 m	MPC · JPL
697544	2017 DL_{159}	—	January 31, 2017	Mount Lemmon	Mount Lemmon Survey	·	490 m	MPC · JPL
697545	2017 DH_{164}	—	February 9, 2022	Haleakala	Pan-STARRS 2	·	1.3 km	MPC · JPL
697546	2017 EX_{4}	—	September 17, 2006	Kitt Peak	Spacewatch	·	1.8 km	MPC · JPL
697547	2017 ER_{6}	—	June 16, 2010	Mount Lemmon	Mount Lemmon Survey	·	1.1 km	MPC · JPL
697548	2017 ES_{6}	—	October 18, 2012	Haleakala	Pan-STARRS 1	·	590 m	MPC · JPL
697549	2017 EE_{7}	—	February 8, 2008	Kitt Peak	Spacewatch	·	1.9 km	MPC · JPL
697550	2017 EY_{8}	—	October 5, 2012	Mount Lemmon	Mount Lemmon Survey	·	590 m	MPC · JPL
697551	2017 EG_{9}	—	October 22, 2012	Haleakala	Pan-STARRS 1	·	650 m	MPC · JPL
697552	2017 EC_{10}	—	March 2, 2017	Mount Lemmon	Mount Lemmon Survey	PHO	760 m	MPC · JPL
697553	2017 EO_{12}	—	September 1, 2005	Kitt Peak	Spacewatch	·	1.8 km	MPC · JPL
697554	2017 EP_{12}	—	October 16, 2003	Kitt Peak	Spacewatch	(5)	900 m	MPC · JPL
697555	2017 EO_{15}	—	December 5, 2010	Mount Lemmon	Mount Lemmon Survey	·	2.5 km	MPC · JPL
697556	2017 EW_{15}	—	April 29, 2012	Kitt Peak	Spacewatch	·	2.7 km	MPC · JPL
697557	2017 ET_{17}	—	February 2, 2006	Mount Lemmon	Mount Lemmon Survey	·	2.0 km	MPC · JPL
697558	2017 ED_{18}	—	January 14, 2011	Kitt Peak	Spacewatch	·	2.5 km	MPC · JPL
697559	2017 EV_{23}	—	April 20, 2012	Kitt Peak	Spacewatch	·	2.2 km	MPC · JPL
697560	2017 EW_{23}	—	April 6, 2008	Kitt Peak	Spacewatch	·	1.7 km	MPC · JPL
697561	2017 EO_{24}	—	September 6, 2008	Mount Lemmon	Mount Lemmon Survey	·	1.9 km	MPC · JPL
697562	2017 EY_{27}	—	October 24, 2008	Kitt Peak	Spacewatch	·	540 m	MPC · JPL
697563	2017 EP_{30}	—	March 5, 2017	Haleakala	Pan-STARRS 1	·	870 m	MPC · JPL
697564	2017 EE_{31}	—	March 4, 2017	Haleakala	Pan-STARRS 1	·	570 m	MPC · JPL
697565	2017 EM_{31}	—	March 7, 2017	Haleakala	Pan-STARRS 1	·	1.7 km	MPC · JPL
697566	2017 EN_{33}	—	March 4, 2017	Haleakala	Pan-STARRS 1	·	730 m	MPC · JPL
697567	2017 EF_{42}	—	March 4, 2017	Haleakala	Pan-STARRS 1	·	940 m	MPC · JPL
697568	2017 FG_{4}	—	January 2, 2017	Haleakala	Pan-STARRS 1	·	640 m	MPC · JPL
697569	2017 FY_{5}	—	August 31, 2014	Haleakala	Pan-STARRS 1	·	2.3 km	MPC · JPL
697570	2017 FG_{7}	—	May 8, 2008	Kitt Peak	Spacewatch	·	1.5 km	MPC · JPL
697571	2017 FJ_{7}	—	January 27, 2007	Mount Lemmon	Mount Lemmon Survey	(16286)	1.8 km	MPC · JPL
697572	2017 FK_{7}	—	April 18, 2007	Mount Lemmon	Mount Lemmon Survey	·	670 m	MPC · JPL
697573	2017 FD_{8}	—	January 23, 2006	Kitt Peak	Spacewatch	·	1.8 km	MPC · JPL
697574	2017 FS_{8}	—	July 31, 2014	Haleakala	Pan-STARRS 1	·	2.2 km	MPC · JPL
697575	2017 FU_{8}	—	April 27, 2008	Mount Lemmon	Mount Lemmon Survey	PAD	1.6 km	MPC · JPL
697576	2017 FC_{9}	—	March 19, 2007	Mount Lemmon	Mount Lemmon Survey	TEL	1.3 km	MPC · JPL
697577	2017 FR_{10}	—	December 4, 2015	Mount Lemmon	Mount Lemmon Survey	·	1.6 km	MPC · JPL
697578	2017 FG_{11}	—	January 26, 2011	Mount Lemmon	Mount Lemmon Survey	·	2.5 km	MPC · JPL
697579	2017 FD_{14}	—	April 30, 2012	Kitt Peak	Spacewatch	THM	1.9 km	MPC · JPL
697580	2017 FH_{14}	—	November 17, 2008	Kitt Peak	Spacewatch	·	680 m	MPC · JPL
697581	2017 FV_{14}	—	July 25, 2014	Haleakala	Pan-STARRS 1	·	1.4 km	MPC · JPL
697582	2017 FE_{16}	—	September 18, 2003	Kitt Peak	Spacewatch	·	2.6 km	MPC · JPL
697583	2017 FE_{17}	—	March 18, 2017	Haleakala	Pan-STARRS 1	·	400 m	MPC · JPL
697584	2017 FG_{20}	—	December 8, 2015	Mount Lemmon	Mount Lemmon Survey	·	1.6 km	MPC · JPL
697585	2017 FM_{20}	—	March 4, 2017	Haleakala	Pan-STARRS 1	·	1.9 km	MPC · JPL
697586	2017 FQ_{20}	—	May 15, 2007	Mount Lemmon	Mount Lemmon Survey	·	2.6 km	MPC · JPL
697587	2017 FR_{22}	—	February 13, 2010	Mount Lemmon	Mount Lemmon Survey	·	510 m	MPC · JPL
697588	2017 FE_{23}	—	June 5, 2014	Haleakala	Pan-STARRS 1	·	570 m	MPC · JPL
697589	2017 FP_{25}	—	November 11, 2009	Kitt Peak	Spacewatch	EOS	1.9 km	MPC · JPL
697590	2017 FP_{27}	—	May 21, 2014	Haleakala	Pan-STARRS 1	·	550 m	MPC · JPL
697591	2017 FJ_{28}	—	May 24, 2001	Apache Point	SDSS Collaboration	EOS	1.9 km	MPC · JPL
697592	2017 FK_{28}	—	November 17, 2006	Mount Lemmon	Mount Lemmon Survey	·	1.7 km	MPC · JPL
697593	2017 FW_{29}	—	March 18, 2017	Kitt Peak	Spacewatch	·	420 m	MPC · JPL
697594	2017 FY_{29}	—	September 18, 2010	Mount Lemmon	Mount Lemmon Survey	·	1.7 km	MPC · JPL
697595	2017 FC_{30}	—	April 4, 1995	Kitt Peak	Spacewatch	·	2.4 km	MPC · JPL
697596	2017 FF_{31}	—	February 25, 2006	Kitt Peak	Spacewatch	·	2.6 km	MPC · JPL
697597	2017 FM_{31}	—	February 17, 2010	Kitt Peak	Spacewatch	·	550 m	MPC · JPL
697598	2017 FJ_{32}	—	January 27, 2006	Kitt Peak	Spacewatch	NYS	790 m	MPC · JPL
697599	2017 FG_{34}	—	January 8, 2010	Kitt Peak	Spacewatch	·	530 m	MPC · JPL
697600	2017 FA_{35}	—	October 20, 2014	Mount Lemmon	Mount Lemmon Survey	·	2.4 km	MPC · JPL

== 697601–697700 ==
back to top

Designation			Discovery			Properties		Ref
Permanent	Provisional	Named after	Date	Site	Discoverer(s)	Category	Diam.	Ref
697601	2017 FM_{35}	—	January 8, 2010	Kitt Peak	Spacewatch	·	560 m	MPC · JPL
697602	2017 FP_{36}	—	May 9, 2014	Haleakala	Pan-STARRS 1	·	1.8 km	MPC · JPL
697603	2017 FR_{36}	—	March 28, 2012	Kitt Peak	Spacewatch	VER	2.2 km	MPC · JPL
697604	2017 FW_{37}	—	May 30, 2011	Haleakala	Pan-STARRS 1	·	650 m	MPC · JPL
697605	2017 FU_{38}	—	January 27, 2011	Kitt Peak	Spacewatch	·	2.5 km	MPC · JPL
697606	2017 FC_{41}	—	March 16, 2004	Kitt Peak	Spacewatch	·	1.4 km	MPC · JPL
697607	2017 FS_{42}	—	April 20, 2006	Kitt Peak	Spacewatch	·	3.0 km	MPC · JPL
697608	2017 FW_{42}	—	September 28, 2009	Mount Lemmon	Mount Lemmon Survey	EMA	2.9 km	MPC · JPL
697609	2017 FR_{43}	—	December 25, 2009	Kitt Peak	Spacewatch	·	750 m	MPC · JPL
697610	2017 FS_{43}	—	June 21, 2014	Haleakala	Pan-STARRS 1	·	620 m	MPC · JPL
697611	2017 FY_{43}	—	September 19, 2009	Mount Lemmon	Mount Lemmon Survey	·	3.0 km	MPC · JPL
697612	2017 FP_{45}	—	July 2, 2008	Kitt Peak	Spacewatch	·	2.5 km	MPC · JPL
697613	2017 FA_{46}	—	August 20, 2014	Haleakala	Pan-STARRS 1	·	2.2 km	MPC · JPL
697614	2017 FW_{46}	—	March 31, 2008	Mount Lemmon	Mount Lemmon Survey	AGN	860 m	MPC · JPL
697615	2017 FF_{47}	—	January 14, 2011	Mount Lemmon	Mount Lemmon Survey	·	1.8 km	MPC · JPL
697616	2017 FU_{47}	—	January 29, 2014	Catalina	CSS	H	500 m	MPC · JPL
697617	2017 FZ_{47}	—	September 30, 2009	Mount Lemmon	Mount Lemmon Survey	EOS	1.6 km	MPC · JPL
697618	2017 FT_{48}	—	September 23, 2008	Mount Lemmon	Mount Lemmon Survey	·	2.6 km	MPC · JPL
697619	2017 FV_{49}	—	January 8, 2010	Mount Lemmon	Mount Lemmon Survey	·	560 m	MPC · JPL
697620	2017 FX_{49}	—	January 28, 2011	Mount Lemmon	Mount Lemmon Survey	·	2.2 km	MPC · JPL
697621	2017 FZ_{49}	—	October 22, 2005	Catalina	CSS	·	760 m	MPC · JPL
697622	2017 FB_{50}	—	January 30, 2011	Mount Lemmon	Mount Lemmon Survey	·	1.8 km	MPC · JPL
697623	2017 FC_{54}	—	January 30, 2017	Haleakala	Pan-STARRS 1	EUN	1.1 km	MPC · JPL
697624	2017 FU_{55}	—	April 26, 2007	Mount Lemmon	Mount Lemmon Survey	·	2.3 km	MPC · JPL
697625	2017 FM_{56}	—	January 25, 2011	Mount Lemmon	Mount Lemmon Survey	EOS	1.8 km	MPC · JPL
697626	2017 FC_{59}	—	June 18, 2013	Haleakala	Pan-STARRS 1	·	2.1 km	MPC · JPL
697627	2017 FJ_{59}	—	December 3, 2015	Mount Lemmon	Mount Lemmon Survey	·	2.1 km	MPC · JPL
697628	2017 FR_{62}	—	January 24, 2011	Mount Lemmon	Mount Lemmon Survey	EOS	2.0 km	MPC · JPL
697629	2017 FY_{65}	—	February 20, 2012	Haleakala	Pan-STARRS 1	·	2.7 km	MPC · JPL
697630	2017 FS_{66}	—	February 5, 2011	Mount Lemmon	Mount Lemmon Survey	VER	2.6 km	MPC · JPL
697631	2017 FT_{67}	—	January 27, 2012	Mount Lemmon	Mount Lemmon Survey	·	1.9 km	MPC · JPL
697632	2017 FD_{68}	—	October 1, 2014	Haleakala	Pan-STARRS 1	·	2.0 km	MPC · JPL
697633	2017 FL_{69}	—	August 20, 2014	Haleakala	Pan-STARRS 1	EOS	1.9 km	MPC · JPL
697634	2017 FB_{70}	—	November 19, 2007	Mount Lemmon	Mount Lemmon Survey	(5)	1.2 km	MPC · JPL
697635	2017 FM_{70}	—	December 17, 2009	Kitt Peak	Spacewatch	·	620 m	MPC · JPL
697636	2017 FO_{71}	—	December 13, 2006	Mount Lemmon	Mount Lemmon Survey	·	1.9 km	MPC · JPL
697637	2017 FF_{72}	—	January 12, 2011	Kitt Peak	Spacewatch	·	2.8 km	MPC · JPL
697638	2017 FV_{72}	—	December 31, 2007	Mount Lemmon	Mount Lemmon Survey	·	1.2 km	MPC · JPL
697639	2017 FB_{73}	—	October 6, 2008	Mount Lemmon	Mount Lemmon Survey	·	2.7 km	MPC · JPL
697640	2017 FC_{73}	—	January 22, 2006	Mount Lemmon	Mount Lemmon Survey	EOS	1.4 km	MPC · JPL
697641	2017 FT_{75}	—	December 9, 2015	Haleakala	Pan-STARRS 1	·	1.4 km	MPC · JPL
697642	2017 FJ_{77}	—	March 1, 2011	Mount Lemmon	Mount Lemmon Survey	·	3.1 km	MPC · JPL
697643	2017 FB_{78}	—	October 19, 2012	Mount Lemmon	Mount Lemmon Survey	·	630 m	MPC · JPL
697644	2017 FC_{78}	—	March 2, 2006	Kitt Peak	Spacewatch	·	2.4 km	MPC · JPL
697645	2017 FH_{78}	—	April 20, 2007	Mount Lemmon	Mount Lemmon Survey	·	1.6 km	MPC · JPL
697646	2017 FF_{79}	—	October 26, 2009	Mount Lemmon	Mount Lemmon Survey	·	2.6 km	MPC · JPL
697647	2017 FE_{82}	—	February 25, 2011	Kitt Peak	Spacewatch	·	2.9 km	MPC · JPL
697648	2017 FW_{82}	—	January 22, 2006	Mount Lemmon	Mount Lemmon Survey	·	680 m	MPC · JPL
697649	2017 FJ_{83}	—	December 10, 2006	Kitt Peak	Spacewatch	·	1.7 km	MPC · JPL
697650	2017 FK_{83}	—	April 9, 2003	Palomar	NEAT	·	720 m	MPC · JPL
697651	2017 FS_{83}	—	September 16, 2009	Mount Lemmon	Mount Lemmon Survey	·	2.5 km	MPC · JPL
697652	2017 FT_{83}	—	December 4, 2005	Mount Lemmon	Mount Lemmon Survey	·	650 m	MPC · JPL
697653	2017 FV_{83}	—	January 13, 2011	Mount Lemmon	Mount Lemmon Survey	·	2.1 km	MPC · JPL
697654	2017 FH_{87}	—	April 11, 2011	Mount Lemmon	Mount Lemmon Survey	·	3.2 km	MPC · JPL
697655	2017 FL_{87}	—	February 22, 2017	Mount Lemmon	Mount Lemmon Survey	·	650 m	MPC · JPL
697656	2017 FV_{91}	—	March 16, 2013	Kitt Peak	Spacewatch	·	1.3 km	MPC · JPL
697657	2017 FZ_{91}	—	January 23, 2006	Kitt Peak	Spacewatch	·	2.5 km	MPC · JPL
697658	2017 FG_{92}	—	November 27, 2006	Mount Lemmon	Mount Lemmon Survey	·	1.9 km	MPC · JPL
697659	2017 FA_{93}	—	August 20, 2014	Haleakala	Pan-STARRS 1	·	3.0 km	MPC · JPL
697660	2017 FD_{93}	—	August 9, 2002	Cerro Tololo	Deep Ecliptic Survey	EOS	1.5 km	MPC · JPL
697661	2017 FG_{93}	—	March 23, 2012	Mount Lemmon	Mount Lemmon Survey	·	3.0 km	MPC · JPL
697662	2017 FV_{93}	—	November 7, 2010	Mount Lemmon	Mount Lemmon Survey	EOS	1.8 km	MPC · JPL
697663	2017 FB_{94}	—	November 11, 2004	Kitt Peak	Spacewatch	·	1.8 km	MPC · JPL
697664	2017 FJ_{94}	—	November 17, 2009	Mount Lemmon	Mount Lemmon Survey	·	3.5 km	MPC · JPL
697665	2017 FR_{94}	—	January 10, 2013	Haleakala	Pan-STARRS 1	·	700 m	MPC · JPL
697666	2017 FK_{95}	—	April 1, 2008	Mount Lemmon	Mount Lemmon Survey	·	2.3 km	MPC · JPL
697667	2017 FW_{95}	—	May 18, 2009	Mount Lemmon	Mount Lemmon Survey	·	910 m	MPC · JPL
697668	2017 FS_{96}	—	September 4, 2008	Kitt Peak	Spacewatch	·	760 m	MPC · JPL
697669	2017 FD_{98}	—	July 30, 2014	Kitt Peak	Spacewatch	·	3.7 km	MPC · JPL
697670	2017 FG_{103}	—	September 24, 2008	Kitt Peak	Spacewatch	·	750 m	MPC · JPL
697671	2017 FT_{104}	—	October 30, 2005	Mount Lemmon	Mount Lemmon Survey	·	1.8 km	MPC · JPL
697672	2017 FZ_{104}	—	February 27, 2012	Haleakala	Pan-STARRS 1	BRA	1.6 km	MPC · JPL
697673	2017 FM_{105}	—	September 2, 2011	Haleakala	Pan-STARRS 1	·	670 m	MPC · JPL
697674	2017 FB_{107}	—	December 9, 2006	Kitt Peak	Spacewatch	·	2.1 km	MPC · JPL
697675	2017 FJ_{107}	—	March 7, 2017	Mount Lemmon	Mount Lemmon Survey	·	1.6 km	MPC · JPL
697676	2017 FH_{109}	—	July 4, 2014	Haleakala	Pan-STARRS 1	·	480 m	MPC · JPL
697677	2017 FO_{109}	—	November 9, 2004	Mauna Kea	Veillet, C.	·	1.6 km	MPC · JPL
697678	2017 FL_{110}	—	September 5, 2008	Kitt Peak	Spacewatch	·	2.3 km	MPC · JPL
697679	2017 FS_{110}	—	January 26, 2017	Haleakala	Pan-STARRS 1	·	580 m	MPC · JPL
697680	2017 FW_{110}	—	March 19, 2017	Haleakala	Pan-STARRS 1	·	480 m	MPC · JPL
697681	2017 FJ_{114}	—	October 1, 2005	Mount Lemmon	Mount Lemmon Survey	·	470 m	MPC · JPL
697682	2017 FP_{114}	—	January 30, 2006	Kitt Peak	Spacewatch	·	1.6 km	MPC · JPL
697683	2017 FA_{115}	—	March 19, 2017	Haleakala	Pan-STARRS 1	·	540 m	MPC · JPL
697684	2017 FM_{116}	—	September 20, 2008	Mount Lemmon	Mount Lemmon Survey	·	2.2 km	MPC · JPL
697685	2017 FO_{117}	—	September 19, 2014	Haleakala	Pan-STARRS 1	·	2.7 km	MPC · JPL
697686	2017 FW_{118}	—	March 19, 2017	Haleakala	Pan-STARRS 1	·	490 m	MPC · JPL
697687	2017 FO_{119}	—	December 22, 2003	Kitt Peak	Spacewatch	·	2.9 km	MPC · JPL
697688	2017 FA_{123}	—	July 28, 2014	Haleakala	Pan-STARRS 1	·	510 m	MPC · JPL
697689	2017 FC_{123}	—	January 30, 2017	Haleakala	Pan-STARRS 1	·	550 m	MPC · JPL
697690	2017 FL_{123}	—	March 5, 2011	Mount Lemmon	Mount Lemmon Survey	·	2.0 km	MPC · JPL
697691	2017 FF_{124}	—	October 22, 2008	Kitt Peak	Spacewatch	·	3.1 km	MPC · JPL
697692	2017 FK_{124}	—	December 2, 2005	Mauna Kea	A. Boattini	THM	1.9 km	MPC · JPL
697693	2017 FV_{124}	—	March 21, 2017	Haleakala	Pan-STARRS 1	·	470 m	MPC · JPL
697694	2017 FA_{125}	—	March 6, 2011	Mount Lemmon	Mount Lemmon Survey	·	2.7 km	MPC · JPL
697695	2017 FC_{130}	—	April 9, 2010	Mount Lemmon	Mount Lemmon Survey	·	740 m	MPC · JPL
697696	2017 FT_{130}	—	October 9, 2015	Haleakala	Pan-STARRS 1	·	510 m	MPC · JPL
697697	2017 FC_{132}	—	February 27, 2006	Kitt Peak	Spacewatch	·	3.0 km	MPC · JPL
697698	2017 FS_{132}	—	March 26, 2017	Mount Lemmon	Mount Lemmon Survey	·	510 m	MPC · JPL
697699	2017 FM_{133}	—	February 22, 2007	Kitt Peak	Spacewatch	·	1.7 km	MPC · JPL
697700	2017 FS_{133}	—	October 1, 2014	Haleakala	Pan-STARRS 1	·	2.1 km	MPC · JPL

== 697701–697800 ==
back to top

Designation			Discovery			Properties		Ref
Permanent	Provisional	Named after	Date	Site	Discoverer(s)	Category	Diam.	Ref
697701	2017 FN_{135}	—	March 18, 2017	Mount Lemmon	Mount Lemmon Survey	·	670 m	MPC · JPL
697702	2017 FO_{136}	—	March 26, 2017	Mount Lemmon	Mount Lemmon Survey	(194)	840 m	MPC · JPL
697703	2017 FK_{137}	—	March 13, 2012	Mount Lemmon	Mount Lemmon Survey	KOR	1.0 km	MPC · JPL
697704	2017 FP_{137}	—	March 19, 2017	Haleakala	Pan-STARRS 1	·	710 m	MPC · JPL
697705	2017 FS_{137}	—	March 26, 2017	Mount Lemmon	Mount Lemmon Survey	·	790 m	MPC · JPL
697706	2017 FT_{137}	—	April 15, 2012	Haleakala	Pan-STARRS 1	EOS	1.6 km	MPC · JPL
697707	2017 FO_{138}	—	October 10, 2005	Kitt Peak	Spacewatch	·	1.6 km	MPC · JPL
697708	2017 FE_{139}	—	August 23, 2014	Haleakala	Pan-STARRS 1	PAD	1.7 km	MPC · JPL
697709	2017 FK_{140}	—	September 28, 2008	Mount Lemmon	Mount Lemmon Survey	·	2.3 km	MPC · JPL
697710	2017 FA_{141}	—	April 20, 2012	Mount Lemmon	Mount Lemmon Survey	·	1.4 km	MPC · JPL
697711	2017 FB_{141}	—	March 26, 2017	Mount Lemmon	Mount Lemmon Survey	NEM	1.5 km	MPC · JPL
697712	2017 FT_{142}	—	April 21, 2012	Mount Lemmon	Mount Lemmon Survey	·	3.0 km	MPC · JPL
697713	2017 FU_{142}	—	February 8, 2011	Mount Lemmon	Mount Lemmon Survey	·	2.2 km	MPC · JPL
697714	2017 FV_{147}	—	September 6, 2008	Kitt Peak	Spacewatch	·	2.8 km	MPC · JPL
697715	2017 FY_{147}	—	February 25, 2006	Mount Lemmon	Mount Lemmon Survey	VER	2.4 km	MPC · JPL
697716	2017 FL_{150}	—	March 21, 2017	Haleakala	Pan-STARRS 1	(2076)	490 m	MPC · JPL
697717	2017 FQ_{152}	—	October 9, 2008	Mount Lemmon	Mount Lemmon Survey	V	460 m	MPC · JPL
697718	2017 FV_{152}	—	October 14, 2014	Mount Lemmon	Mount Lemmon Survey	·	2.5 km	MPC · JPL
697719	2017 FX_{152}	—	March 4, 2013	Haleakala	Pan-STARRS 1	·	1.1 km	MPC · JPL
697720	2017 FU_{153}	—	January 14, 2011	Mount Lemmon	Mount Lemmon Survey	·	2.3 km	MPC · JPL
697721	2017 FE_{154}	—	March 7, 2017	Mount Lemmon	Mount Lemmon Survey	·	650 m	MPC · JPL
697722	2017 FJ_{155}	—	September 28, 2008	Mount Lemmon	Mount Lemmon Survey	·	2.8 km	MPC · JPL
697723	2017 FN_{156}	—	July 29, 2008	Kitt Peak	Spacewatch	EOS	1.6 km	MPC · JPL
697724	2017 FS_{156}	—	July 5, 2003	Kitt Peak	Spacewatch	EOS	1.8 km	MPC · JPL
697725	2017 FQ_{159}	—	September 11, 2004	Kitt Peak	Spacewatch	KOR	1.2 km	MPC · JPL
697726	2017 FW_{159}	—	December 25, 2005	Kitt Peak	Spacewatch	EOS	1.8 km	MPC · JPL
697727	2017 FM_{160}	—	July 27, 2001	Palomar	NEAT	·	3.3 km	MPC · JPL
697728	2017 FL_{161}	—	March 15, 2012	Kitt Peak	Spacewatch	·	1.7 km	MPC · JPL
697729	2017 FV_{161}	—	December 11, 2004	Kitt Peak	Spacewatch	·	2.9 km	MPC · JPL
697730	2017 FW_{163}	—	March 19, 2017	Haleakala	Pan-STARRS 1	·	460 m	MPC · JPL
697731	2017 FB_{165}	—	March 18, 2017	Mount Lemmon	Mount Lemmon Survey	·	1.0 km	MPC · JPL
697732	2017 FL_{168}	—	August 27, 2014	Haleakala	Pan-STARRS 1	·	2.2 km	MPC · JPL
697733	2017 FG_{171}	—	February 3, 2011	Piszkés-tető	K. Sárneczky, Z. Kuli	·	2.1 km	MPC · JPL
697734	2017 FO_{173}	—	March 19, 2017	Haleakala	Pan-STARRS 1	·	750 m	MPC · JPL
697735	2017 FR_{174}	—	March 22, 2017	Haleakala	Pan-STARRS 1	·	550 m	MPC · JPL
697736	2017 FU_{174}	—	March 20, 2017	Haleakala	Pan-STARRS 1	VER	2.1 km	MPC · JPL
697737	2017 FZ_{174}	—	March 19, 2017	Haleakala	Pan-STARRS 1	·	720 m	MPC · JPL
697738	2017 FG_{175}	—	March 20, 2017	Haleakala	Pan-STARRS 1	·	520 m	MPC · JPL
697739	2017 FZ_{177}	—	March 20, 2017	Kitt Peak	Spacewatch	·	2.7 km	MPC · JPL
697740	2017 FB_{178}	—	July 27, 2014	Haleakala	Pan-STARRS 1	CLA	1.3 km	MPC · JPL
697741	2017 FD_{178}	—	March 20, 2017	Haleakala	Pan-STARRS 1	·	410 m	MPC · JPL
697742	2017 FD_{181}	—	March 20, 2017	Haleakala	Pan-STARRS 1	·	690 m	MPC · JPL
697743	2017 FA_{182}	—	March 19, 2017	Haleakala	Pan-STARRS 1	VER	1.8 km	MPC · JPL
697744	2017 FE_{192}	—	March 31, 2017	Cerro Paranal	Altmann, M., Prusti, T.	·	580 m	MPC · JPL
697745	2017 FX_{194}	—	March 19, 2017	Mount Lemmon	Mount Lemmon Survey	·	590 m	MPC · JPL
697746	2017 FT_{198}	—	March 20, 2017	Haleakala	Pan-STARRS 1	·	2.3 km	MPC · JPL
697747	2017 FY_{209}	—	May 6, 2014	Haleakala	Pan-STARRS 1	·	560 m	MPC · JPL
697748	2017 FL_{215}	—	March 21, 2017	Haleakala	Pan-STARRS 1	·	520 m	MPC · JPL
697749	2017 GG_{1}	—	June 24, 2014	Haleakala	Pan-STARRS 1	·	1.0 km	MPC · JPL
697750	2017 GZ_{1}	—	January 19, 2012	Haleakala	Pan-STARRS 1	·	1.5 km	MPC · JPL
697751	2017 GS_{3}	—	September 28, 2008	Mount Lemmon	Mount Lemmon Survey	·	2.2 km	MPC · JPL
697752	2017 GF_{9}	—	May 6, 2006	Mount Lemmon	Mount Lemmon Survey	·	3.0 km	MPC · JPL
697753	2017 GO_{13}	—	April 2, 2017	Haleakala	Pan-STARRS 1	·	590 m	MPC · JPL
697754	2017 GV_{15}	—	April 3, 2017	Haleakala	Pan-STARRS 1	HOF	1.8 km	MPC · JPL
697755	2017 GW_{16}	—	April 3, 2017	Haleakala	Pan-STARRS 1	·	540 m	MPC · JPL
697756	2017 GL_{18}	—	March 5, 2017	Haleakala	Pan-STARRS 1	V	470 m	MPC · JPL
697757	2017 GW_{18}	—	April 2, 2017	Haleakala	Pan-STARRS 1	·	780 m	MPC · JPL
697758	2017 GW_{22}	—	April 1, 2017	Haleakala	Pan-STARRS 1	·	600 m	MPC · JPL
697759	2017 GY_{23}	—	April 3, 2017	Haleakala	Pan-STARRS 1	·	500 m	MPC · JPL
697760	2017 GS_{31}	—	December 3, 2005	Mauna Kea	A. Boattini	V	460 m	MPC · JPL
697761	2017 HY_{2}	—	January 16, 2013	Haleakala	Pan-STARRS 1	·	1 km	MPC · JPL
697762	2017 HZ_{2}	—	November 17, 2014	Haleakala	Pan-STARRS 1	·	3.0 km	MPC · JPL
697763	2017 HR_{6}	—	January 27, 2011	Kitt Peak	Spacewatch	·	2.7 km	MPC · JPL
697764	2017 HY_{7}	—	September 19, 2014	Haleakala	Pan-STARRS 1	·	1.3 km	MPC · JPL
697765	2017 HP_{9}	—	November 24, 2009	Mount Lemmon	Mount Lemmon Survey	·	2.1 km	MPC · JPL
697766	2017 HJ_{11}	—	November 8, 2015	Mount Lemmon	Mount Lemmon Survey	·	540 m	MPC · JPL
697767	2017 HF_{12}	—	October 6, 2008	Mount Lemmon	Mount Lemmon Survey	·	2.3 km	MPC · JPL
697768	2017 HX_{13}	—	February 24, 2012	Kitt Peak	Spacewatch	·	1.9 km	MPC · JPL
697769	2017 HJ_{15}	—	September 10, 2007	Mount Lemmon	Mount Lemmon Survey	·	2.2 km	MPC · JPL
697770	2017 HK_{16}	—	September 15, 2007	Mount Lemmon	Mount Lemmon Survey	·	740 m	MPC · JPL
697771	2017 HP_{16}	—	July 30, 2014	Kitt Peak	Spacewatch	·	560 m	MPC · JPL
697772	2017 HB_{17}	—	April 21, 2006	Kitt Peak	Spacewatch	·	2.8 km	MPC · JPL
697773	2017 HK_{19}	—	June 23, 2014	Mount Lemmon	Mount Lemmon Survey	·	650 m	MPC · JPL
697774	2017 HO_{20}	—	February 10, 2016	Haleakala	Pan-STARRS 1	·	2.1 km	MPC · JPL
697775	2017 HP_{27}	—	March 5, 2006	Kitt Peak	Spacewatch	·	2.3 km	MPC · JPL
697776	2017 HX_{27}	—	August 3, 2014	Haleakala	Pan-STARRS 1	·	770 m	MPC · JPL
697777	2017 HP_{29}	—	December 16, 2015	Mount Lemmon	Mount Lemmon Survey	·	860 m	MPC · JPL
697778	2017 HH_{32}	—	April 17, 2013	Haleakala	Pan-STARRS 1	·	1.0 km	MPC · JPL
697779	2017 HR_{32}	—	November 1, 2008	Mount Lemmon	Mount Lemmon Survey	NYS	790 m	MPC · JPL
697780	2017 HA_{33}	—	September 4, 2007	Catalina	CSS	·	3.6 km	MPC · JPL
697781	2017 HH_{36}	—	March 2, 2011	Mount Lemmon	Mount Lemmon Survey	·	2.1 km	MPC · JPL
697782	2017 HV_{37}	—	April 26, 2017	Haleakala	Pan-STARRS 1	·	860 m	MPC · JPL
697783	2017 HR_{39}	—	April 26, 2017	Haleakala	Pan-STARRS 1	V	450 m	MPC · JPL
697784	2017 HF_{43}	—	August 11, 2001	Palomar	NEAT	·	3.4 km	MPC · JPL
697785	2017 HH_{43}	—	February 9, 2017	Haleakala	Pan-STARRS 1	·	690 m	MPC · JPL
697786	2017 HK_{43}	—	September 21, 2009	Mount Lemmon	Mount Lemmon Survey	·	2.6 km	MPC · JPL
697787	2017 HN_{44}	—	April 7, 2006	Kitt Peak	Spacewatch	NYS	920 m	MPC · JPL
697788	2017 HB_{45}	—	February 9, 2007	Kitt Peak	Spacewatch	·	560 m	MPC · JPL
697789	2017 HS_{45}	—	March 2, 2013	Mount Lemmon	Mount Lemmon Survey	·	710 m	MPC · JPL
697790	2017 HH_{50}	—	January 6, 2010	Mount Lemmon	Mount Lemmon Survey	·	2.2 km	MPC · JPL
697791	2017 HK_{50}	—	May 6, 2006	Mount Lemmon	Mount Lemmon Survey	THB	2.4 km	MPC · JPL
697792	2017 HL_{50}	—	March 4, 2005	Mount Lemmon	Mount Lemmon Survey	LIX	3.5 km	MPC · JPL
697793	2017 HM_{50}	—	May 24, 2001	Apache Point	SDSS Collaboration	EOS	1.6 km	MPC · JPL
697794	2017 HW_{61}	—	March 1, 2011	Mayhill-ISON	L. Elenin	·	2.7 km	MPC · JPL
697795	2017 HC_{62}	—	October 6, 2008	Mount Lemmon	Mount Lemmon Survey	EOS	1.9 km	MPC · JPL
697796	2017 HD_{62}	—	January 7, 2016	Haleakala	Pan-STARRS 1	·	2.1 km	MPC · JPL
697797	2017 HZ_{62}	—	October 9, 2008	Catalina	CSS	·	2.3 km	MPC · JPL
697798	2017 HX_{64}	—	April 19, 2017	Mount Lemmon	Mount Lemmon Survey	·	770 m	MPC · JPL
697799	2017 HF_{68}	—	April 27, 2017	Haleakala	Pan-STARRS 1	·	840 m	MPC · JPL
697800	2017 HW_{68}	—	April 27, 2017	Haleakala	Pan-STARRS 1	·	480 m	MPC · JPL

== 697801–697900 ==
back to top

Designation			Discovery			Properties		Ref
Permanent	Provisional	Named after	Date	Site	Discoverer(s)	Category	Diam.	Ref
697801	2017 HZ_{76}	—	April 26, 2017	Haleakala	Pan-STARRS 1	PAD	1.2 km	MPC · JPL
697802	2017 HP_{81}	—	April 26, 2017	Haleakala	Pan-STARRS 1	V	390 m	MPC · JPL
697803	2017 HS_{81}	—	April 26, 2017	Haleakala	Pan-STARRS 1	·	720 m	MPC · JPL
697804	2017 HB_{94}	—	December 21, 2008	Catalina	CSS	·	920 m	MPC · JPL
697805	2017 HE_{99}	—	April 27, 2017	Haleakala	Pan-STARRS 1	·	830 m	MPC · JPL
697806	2017 JQ	—	March 18, 2010	Kitt Peak	Spacewatch	·	500 m	MPC · JPL
697807	2017 JT	—	August 30, 2014	Mount Lemmon	Mount Lemmon Survey	·	3.0 km	MPC · JPL
697808	2017 JY	—	January 16, 2013	Mount Lemmon	Mount Lemmon Survey	·	780 m	MPC · JPL
697809	2017 JA_{3}	—	April 1, 2017	Haleakala	Pan-STARRS 1	·	380 m	MPC · JPL
697810	2017 JU_{3}	—	April 13, 2008	Kitt Peak	Spacewatch	·	1.5 km	MPC · JPL
697811	2017 JJ_{6}	—	December 4, 2007	Mount Lemmon	Mount Lemmon Survey	·	3.3 km	MPC · JPL
697812	2017 JK_{9}	—	May 2, 2017	Mount Lemmon	Mount Lemmon Survey	MAS	510 m	MPC · JPL
697813	2017 JX_{9}	—	May 4, 2017	Haleakala	Pan-STARRS 1	NYS	740 m	MPC · JPL
697814	2017 JR_{10}	—	May 4, 2017	Haleakala	Pan-STARRS 1	NYS	850 m	MPC · JPL
697815	2017 JG_{12}	—	January 28, 2011	Kitt Peak	Spacewatch	EOS	1.3 km	MPC · JPL
697816	2017 JW_{12}	—	April 18, 2013	Kitt Peak	Spacewatch	·	1.3 km	MPC · JPL
697817	2017 KV_{1}	—	December 10, 2004	Kitt Peak	Spacewatch	·	2.7 km	MPC · JPL
697818	2017 KR_{6}	—	June 30, 2008	Kitt Peak	Spacewatch	·	2.2 km	MPC · JPL
697819	2017 KA_{11}	—	March 5, 2011	Catalina	CSS	·	3.0 km	MPC · JPL
697820	2017 KZ_{12}	—	November 2, 2002	La Palma	A. Fitzsimmons	·	2.5 km	MPC · JPL
697821	2017 KB_{14}	—	January 10, 2008	Mount Lemmon	Mount Lemmon Survey	3:2	4.1 km	MPC · JPL
697822	2017 KH_{14}	—	November 2, 2007	Kitt Peak	Spacewatch	·	4.1 km	MPC · JPL
697823	2017 KZ_{15}	—	April 2, 2011	Kitt Peak	Spacewatch	·	3.0 km	MPC · JPL
697824	2017 KB_{16}	—	January 2, 2016	Haleakala	Pan-STARRS 1	ADE	1.9 km	MPC · JPL
697825	2017 KV_{20}	—	August 27, 2014	Haleakala	Pan-STARRS 1	NYS	860 m	MPC · JPL
697826	2017 KG_{21}	—	March 5, 2006	Kitt Peak	Spacewatch	·	2.6 km	MPC · JPL
697827	2017 KC_{25}	—	January 13, 2015	Haleakala	Pan-STARRS 1	·	3.1 km	MPC · JPL
697828	2017 KB_{26}	—	April 2, 2016	Mount Lemmon	Mount Lemmon Survey	VER	2.4 km	MPC · JPL
697829	2017 KY_{27}	—	March 12, 2011	Mount Lemmon	Mount Lemmon Survey	·	2.4 km	MPC · JPL
697830	2017 KZ_{29}	—	April 25, 2006	Kitt Peak	Spacewatch	·	650 m	MPC · JPL
697831	2017 KS_{33}	—	September 23, 2008	Kitt Peak	Spacewatch	EOS	1.6 km	MPC · JPL
697832	2017 KA_{37}	—	January 18, 2015	Haleakala	Pan-STARRS 1	·	2.4 km	MPC · JPL
697833	2017 KN_{37}	—	September 18, 2014	Haleakala	Pan-STARRS 1	·	900 m	MPC · JPL
697834	2017 KZ_{38}	—	May 19, 2017	Haleakala	Pan-STARRS 1	·	950 m	MPC · JPL
697835	2017 KS_{39}	—	May 19, 2017	Haleakala	Pan-STARRS 1	·	810 m	MPC · JPL
697836	2017 KB_{40}	—	May 24, 2017	Haleakala	Pan-STARRS 1	·	1.1 km	MPC · JPL
697837	2017 KT_{43}	—	May 19, 2017	Haleakala	Pan-STARRS 1	·	550 m	MPC · JPL
697838	2017 KP_{44}	—	September 26, 2003	Apache Point	SDSS	·	770 m	MPC · JPL
697839	2017 LN_{3}	—	March 28, 2016	Cerro Tololo	DECam	·	750 m	MPC · JPL
697840	2017 MK_{4}	—	July 4, 2010	Mount Lemmon	Mount Lemmon Survey	·	880 m	MPC · JPL
697841	2017 MV_{15}	—	June 23, 2017	Haleakala	Pan-STARRS 1	·	2.6 km	MPC · JPL
697842	2017 MH_{16}	—	June 25, 2017	Haleakala	Pan-STARRS 1	·	930 m	MPC · JPL
697843	2017 ML_{16}	—	June 21, 2017	Haleakala	Pan-STARRS 1	·	1.3 km	MPC · JPL
697844	2017 MO_{22}	—	June 20, 2017	Haleakala	Pan-STARRS 1	·	820 m	MPC · JPL
697845	2017 MB_{23}	—	June 21, 2017	Haleakala	Pan-STARRS 1	·	890 m	MPC · JPL
697846	2017 NE_{2}	—	April 17, 2009	Mount Lemmon	Mount Lemmon Survey	NYS	930 m	MPC · JPL
697847	2017 NZ_{2}	—	November 12, 2010	Mount Lemmon	Mount Lemmon Survey	·	1.0 km	MPC · JPL
697848	2017 NV_{7}	—	July 5, 2017	Haleakala	Pan-STARRS 1	·	810 m	MPC · JPL
697849	2017 NB_{8}	—	July 4, 2017	Haleakala	Pan-STARRS 1	·	880 m	MPC · JPL
697850	2017 NL_{19}	—	July 4, 2017	Haleakala	Pan-STARRS 1	V	510 m	MPC · JPL
697851	2017 NW_{19}	—	September 27, 2006	Kitt Peak	Spacewatch	·	840 m	MPC · JPL
697852	2017 OK_{3}	—	May 24, 2006	Mount Lemmon	Mount Lemmon Survey	·	890 m	MPC · JPL
697853	2017 OY_{3}	—	July 15, 2013	Haleakala	Pan-STARRS 1	·	990 m	MPC · JPL
697854	2017 OD_{4}	—	August 8, 2002	Palomar	NEAT	·	860 m	MPC · JPL
697855	2017 OC_{16}	—	June 24, 2017	Haleakala	Pan-STARRS 1	·	1.3 km	MPC · JPL
697856	2017 OH_{20}	—	September 17, 2004	Kitt Peak	Spacewatch	·	730 m	MPC · JPL
697857	2017 OS_{21}	—	May 27, 2017	Haleakala	Pan-STARRS 1	·	1.3 km	MPC · JPL
697858	2017 OA_{23}	—	December 10, 2010	Kitt Peak	Spacewatch	·	890 m	MPC · JPL
697859	2017 OV_{24}	—	August 10, 2013	Mount Lemmon	Mount Lemmon Survey	·	940 m	MPC · JPL
697860	2017 OC_{34}	—	August 15, 2013	Haleakala	Pan-STARRS 1	·	1.4 km	MPC · JPL
697861	2017 OW_{35}	—	November 13, 2012	Mount Lemmon	Mount Lemmon Survey	LIX	2.6 km	MPC · JPL
697862	2017 OJ_{39}	—	January 28, 2016	Haleakala	Pan-STARRS 1	H	450 m	MPC · JPL
697863	2017 OF_{40}	—	July 27, 2017	Haleakala	Pan-STARRS 1	·	2.2 km	MPC · JPL
697864	2017 OJ_{45}	—	August 2, 2013	Haleakala	Pan-STARRS 1	PHO	590 m	MPC · JPL
697865	2017 OJ_{50}	—	July 29, 2017	Haleakala	Pan-STARRS 1	·	1 km	MPC · JPL
697866	2017 OD_{52}	—	September 5, 2008	Kitt Peak	Spacewatch	·	1.3 km	MPC · JPL
697867	2017 OB_{53}	—	March 17, 2012	Charleston	R. Holmes	·	860 m	MPC · JPL
697868	2017 OE_{54}	—	February 25, 2006	Mount Lemmon	Mount Lemmon Survey	(2076)	690 m	MPC · JPL
697869	2017 OJ_{54}	—	December 4, 2007	Kitt Peak	Spacewatch	NYS	860 m	MPC · JPL
697870	2017 OP_{55}	—	September 29, 2005	Mount Lemmon	Mount Lemmon Survey	·	760 m	MPC · JPL
697871	2017 OZ_{56}	—	July 19, 2007	Mount Lemmon	Mount Lemmon Survey	KOR	1.2 km	MPC · JPL
697872	2017 OC_{87}	—	July 30, 2017	Haleakala	Pan-STARRS 1	·	1.3 km	MPC · JPL
697873	2017 OE_{87}	—	July 26, 2017	Haleakala	Pan-STARRS 1	·	1.3 km	MPC · JPL
697874	2017 OE_{90}	—	July 30, 2017	Haleakala	Pan-STARRS 1	V	550 m	MPC · JPL
697875	2017 OM_{90}	—	July 24, 2017	Haleakala	Pan-STARRS 1	·	800 m	MPC · JPL
697876	2017 OB_{91}	—	July 30, 2017	Haleakala	Pan-STARRS 1	MAS	500 m	MPC · JPL
697877	2017 OG_{91}	—	July 24, 2017	Haleakala	Pan-STARRS 1	MAS	500 m	MPC · JPL
697878	2017 OD_{92}	—	July 26, 2017	Haleakala	Pan-STARRS 1	·	960 m	MPC · JPL
697879	2017 OA_{93}	—	July 25, 2017	Haleakala	Pan-STARRS 1	·	1.2 km	MPC · JPL
697880	2017 OP_{93}	—	May 3, 2016	Cerro Tololo	DECam	·	790 m	MPC · JPL
697881	2017 OD_{94}	—	July 30, 2017	Haleakala	Pan-STARRS 1	NYS	860 m	MPC · JPL
697882	2017 OP_{95}	—	June 25, 2017	Haleakala	Pan-STARRS 1	·	1.5 km	MPC · JPL
697883	2017 OU_{95}	—	July 30, 2017	Haleakala	Pan-STARRS 1	·	1.3 km	MPC · JPL
697884	2017 OF_{96}	—	July 29, 2017	Haleakala	Pan-STARRS 1	·	770 m	MPC · JPL
697885	2017 OD_{102}	—	July 25, 2017	Haleakala	Pan-STARRS 1	CLA	1.1 km	MPC · JPL
697886	2017 OQ_{104}	—	July 25, 2017	Haleakala	Pan-STARRS 1	·	770 m	MPC · JPL
697887	2017 OJ_{116}	—	October 26, 2005	Kitt Peak	Spacewatch	·	1.1 km	MPC · JPL
697888	2017 OA_{121}	—	July 27, 2017	Haleakala	Pan-STARRS 1	HNS	910 m	MPC · JPL
697889	2017 OS_{129}	—	July 25, 2017	Haleakala	Pan-STARRS 1	·	920 m	MPC · JPL
697890	2017 OJ_{132}	—	July 24, 2017	Haleakala	Pan-STARRS 1	·	860 m	MPC · JPL
697891	2017 OC_{133}	—	July 25, 2017	Haleakala	Pan-STARRS 1	·	1.2 km	MPC · JPL
697892	2017 OG_{135}	—	January 23, 2015	Haleakala	Pan-STARRS 1	·	1.4 km	MPC · JPL
697893	2017 OW_{138}	—	July 30, 2017	Haleakala	Pan-STARRS 1	NYS	840 m	MPC · JPL
697894	2017 OT_{155}	—	October 23, 2009	Mount Lemmon	Mount Lemmon Survey	·	1.0 km	MPC · JPL
697895	2017 OX_{187}	—	September 12, 2013	Mount Lemmon	Mount Lemmon Survey	·	1.0 km	MPC · JPL
697896	2017 PW	—	July 12, 2013	Haleakala	Pan-STARRS 1	·	870 m	MPC · JPL
697897	2017 PP_{3}	—	February 17, 2007	Kitt Peak	Spacewatch	·	880 m	MPC · JPL
697898	2017 PU_{3}	—	July 1, 2013	Haleakala	Pan-STARRS 1	·	870 m	MPC · JPL
697899	2017 PE_{9}	—	February 10, 2016	Haleakala	Pan-STARRS 1	·	940 m	MPC · JPL
697900	2017 PT_{10}	—	April 23, 2009	Mount Lemmon	Mount Lemmon Survey	MAS	690 m	MPC · JPL

== 697901–698000 ==
back to top

Designation			Discovery			Properties		Ref
Permanent	Provisional	Named after	Date	Site	Discoverer(s)	Category	Diam.	Ref
697901	2017 PA_{11}	—	January 25, 2015	Haleakala	Pan-STARRS 1	·	990 m	MPC · JPL
697902	2017 PN_{30}	—	July 26, 2017	Haleakala	Pan-STARRS 1	·	1.4 km	MPC · JPL
697903	2017 PP_{38}	—	April 1, 2016	Haleakala	Pan-STARRS 1	·	1.0 km	MPC · JPL
697904	2017 PO_{42}	—	August 4, 2017	Haleakala	Pan-STARRS 1	EUN	960 m	MPC · JPL
697905	2017 PC_{43}	—	March 23, 2015	Kitt Peak	Wasserman, L. H., M. W. Buie	·	1.3 km	MPC · JPL
697906	2017 PL_{46}	—	August 1, 2017	Haleakala	Pan-STARRS 1	·	1.6 km	MPC · JPL
697907	2017 PY_{51}	—	August 4, 2017	Haleakala	Pan-STARRS 1	·	810 m	MPC · JPL
697908	2017 PE_{54}	—	August 4, 2017	Haleakala	Pan-STARRS 1	·	1.2 km	MPC · JPL
697909	2017 PB_{57}	—	August 1, 2017	Haleakala	Pan-STARRS 1	·	1.3 km	MPC · JPL
697910	2017 PG_{65}	—	January 23, 2015	Haleakala	Pan-STARRS 1	·	1.4 km	MPC · JPL
697911	2017 PV_{87}	—	January 30, 2011	Mount Lemmon	Mount Lemmon Survey	·	780 m	MPC · JPL
697912	2017 QH	—	February 27, 2006	Mount Lemmon	Mount Lemmon Survey	H	420 m	MPC · JPL
697913	2017 QY_{3}	—	May 13, 2005	Kitt Peak	Spacewatch	·	1.0 km	MPC · JPL
697914	2017 QB_{8}	—	January 13, 2015	Haleakala	Pan-STARRS 1	·	840 m	MPC · JPL
697915	2017 QW_{19}	—	March 19, 2009	Kitt Peak	Spacewatch	·	1.1 km	MPC · JPL
697916	2017 QS_{20}	—	August 12, 2013	Haleakala	Pan-STARRS 1	·	710 m	MPC · JPL
697917	2017 QV_{21}	—	March 27, 2008	Mount Lemmon	Mount Lemmon Survey	·	950 m	MPC · JPL
697918	2017 QY_{23}	—	September 16, 1998	Kitt Peak	Spacewatch	·	1.1 km	MPC · JPL
697919	2017 QU_{30}	—	October 26, 2005	Kitt Peak	Spacewatch	KON	1.5 km	MPC · JPL
697920	2017 QM_{36}	—	July 5, 2017	Haleakala	Pan-STARRS 1	MAS	610 m	MPC · JPL
697921	2017 QF_{39}	—	February 8, 2016	Mount Lemmon	Mount Lemmon Survey	·	850 m	MPC · JPL
697922	2017 QR_{41}	—	February 8, 2002	Kitt Peak	Spacewatch	EUN	1.2 km	MPC · JPL
697923	2017 QX_{44}	—	January 8, 2016	Haleakala	Pan-STARRS 1	·	770 m	MPC · JPL
697924	2017 QZ_{44}	—	August 17, 2017	Haleakala	Pan-STARRS 1	·	1.0 km	MPC · JPL
697925	2017 QO_{53}	—	September 19, 1998	Apache Point	SDSS Collaboration	KOR	1.1 km	MPC · JPL
697926	2017 QR_{90}	—	August 17, 2017	Haleakala	Pan-STARRS 1	(5)	810 m	MPC · JPL
697927	2017 QD_{93}	—	March 21, 1999	Apache Point	SDSS Collaboration	KON	1.7 km	MPC · JPL
697928	2017 QE_{94}	—	August 18, 2017	Haleakala	Pan-STARRS 1	·	720 m	MPC · JPL
697929	2017 QO_{94}	—	August 16, 2017	Haleakala	Pan-STARRS 1	·	1.5 km	MPC · JPL
697930	2017 QD_{95}	—	August 18, 2017	Haleakala	Pan-STARRS 1	·	830 m	MPC · JPL
697931	2017 QD_{98}	—	August 31, 2017	Haleakala	Pan-STARRS 1	·	1.3 km	MPC · JPL
697932	2017 QH_{98}	—	August 31, 2017	Haleakala	Pan-STARRS 1	·	890 m	MPC · JPL
697933	2017 QJ_{99}	—	August 1, 2017	Haleakala	Pan-STARRS 1	·	880 m	MPC · JPL
697934	2017 QM_{101}	—	August 24, 2017	Haleakala	Pan-STARRS 1	·	840 m	MPC · JPL
697935	2017 QE_{109}	—	August 31, 2017	Haleakala	Pan-STARRS 1	MAR	650 m	MPC · JPL
697936	2017 QV_{118}	—	August 23, 2017	XuYi	PMO NEO Survey Program	·	1.0 km	MPC · JPL
697937	2017 QY_{120}	—	February 5, 2011	Haleakala	Pan-STARRS 1	·	800 m	MPC · JPL
697938	2017 QH_{124}	—	March 29, 2016	Cerro Tololo	DECam	·	780 m	MPC · JPL
697939	2017 QD_{125}	—	August 16, 2017	Haleakala	Pan-STARRS 1	HNS	740 m	MPC · JPL
697940	2017 QG_{126}	—	August 16, 2017	Haleakala	Pan-STARRS 1	·	1.2 km	MPC · JPL
697941	2017 QS_{127}	—	August 24, 2017	Haleakala	Pan-STARRS 1	MAR	820 m	MPC · JPL
697942	2017 QV_{131}	—	February 5, 2011	Catalina	CSS	·	1.3 km	MPC · JPL
697943	2017 QM_{132}	—	August 31, 2017	Haleakala	Pan-STARRS 1	·	850 m	MPC · JPL
697944	2017 QV_{161}	—	August 19, 2017	Haleakala	Pan-STARRS 1	EUN	760 m	MPC · JPL
697945	2017 QE_{164}	—	August 17, 2017	Haleakala	Pan-STARRS 1	·	920 m	MPC · JPL
697946	2017 QB_{170}	—	September 4, 2013	Mount Lemmon	Mount Lemmon Survey	·	1.1 km	MPC · JPL
697947	2017 QC_{170}	—	August 24, 2017	Haleakala	Pan-STARRS 1	·	1.2 km	MPC · JPL
697948	2017 RZ_{1}	—	January 11, 2016	Haleakala	Pan-STARRS 1	H	410 m	MPC · JPL
697949	2017 RL_{4}	—	July 14, 2013	Haleakala	Pan-STARRS 1	·	1.1 km	MPC · JPL
697950	2017 RW_{13}	—	February 5, 2011	Haleakala	Pan-STARRS 1	·	920 m	MPC · JPL
697951	2017 RT_{16}	—	November 20, 2009	Kitt Peak	Spacewatch	·	1.6 km	MPC · JPL
697952	2017 RD_{19}	—	April 3, 2016	Haleakala	Pan-STARRS 1	·	790 m	MPC · JPL
697953	2017 RL_{22}	—	September 13, 2013	Mount Lemmon	Mount Lemmon Survey	MAR	880 m	MPC · JPL
697954	2017 RL_{23}	—	July 31, 2013	Mayhill-ISON	L. Elenin	·	900 m	MPC · JPL
697955	2017 RQ_{27}	—	October 27, 2005	Kitt Peak	Spacewatch	·	950 m	MPC · JPL
697956	2017 RR_{32}	—	October 3, 2013	Mount Lemmon	Mount Lemmon Survey	·	1.0 km	MPC · JPL
697957	2017 RL_{40}	—	February 14, 2007	Mauna Kea	P. A. Wiegert	·	730 m	MPC · JPL
697958	2017 RP_{41}	—	February 23, 2007	Kitt Peak	Spacewatch	MAR	730 m	MPC · JPL
697959	2017 RO_{50}	—	July 13, 2013	Haleakala	Pan-STARRS 1	NYS	690 m	MPC · JPL
697960	2017 RB_{55}	—	February 16, 2015	Haleakala	Pan-STARRS 1	·	1.2 km	MPC · JPL
697961	2017 RY_{55}	—	July 1, 2013	Haleakala	Pan-STARRS 1	MAS	460 m	MPC · JPL
697962	2017 RH_{56}	—	October 12, 2013	Kitt Peak	Spacewatch	·	1.2 km	MPC · JPL
697963	2017 RY_{57}	—	August 20, 2017	Haleakala	Pan-STARRS 1	NYS	870 m	MPC · JPL
697964	2017 RX_{59}	—	September 21, 2009	Mount Lemmon	Mount Lemmon Survey	·	1.0 km	MPC · JPL
697965	2017 RT_{63}	—	March 10, 2016	Haleakala	Pan-STARRS 1	·	770 m	MPC · JPL
697966	2017 RE_{69}	—	January 23, 2015	Haleakala	Pan-STARRS 1	HNS	740 m	MPC · JPL
697967	2017 RD_{75}	—	January 28, 2015	Haleakala	Pan-STARRS 1	·	1.1 km	MPC · JPL
697968	2017 RW_{77}	—	December 27, 2014	Mount Lemmon	Mount Lemmon Survey	EUN	800 m	MPC · JPL
697969	2017 RU_{82}	—	April 8, 2003	Kitt Peak	Spacewatch	·	500 m	MPC · JPL
697970	2017 RL_{83}	—	July 22, 2006	Mount Lemmon	Mount Lemmon Survey	MAS	750 m	MPC · JPL
697971	2017 RK_{85}	—	January 11, 2008	Kitt Peak	Spacewatch	·	800 m	MPC · JPL
697972	2017 RZ_{87}	—	September 13, 2002	Palomar	NEAT	·	1.2 km	MPC · JPL
697973	2017 RK_{88}	—	April 1, 2016	Haleakala	Pan-STARRS 1	NYS	990 m	MPC · JPL
697974	2017 RS_{90}	—	October 29, 2005	Mount Lemmon	Mount Lemmon Survey	·	810 m	MPC · JPL
697975	2017 RP_{94}	—	September 15, 2017	Haleakala	Pan-STARRS 1	·	1.2 km	MPC · JPL
697976	2017 RQ_{95}	—	October 8, 2013	Kitt Peak	Spacewatch	·	1.1 km	MPC · JPL
697977	2017 RW_{95}	—	September 15, 2017	Haleakala	Pan-STARRS 1	·	1.2 km	MPC · JPL
697978	2017 RQ_{97}	—	May 29, 2008	Kitt Peak	Spacewatch	·	710 m	MPC · JPL
697979	2017 RT_{99}	—	November 20, 2006	Kitt Peak	Spacewatch	MAS	450 m	MPC · JPL
697980	2017 RV_{99}	—	December 3, 2013	Haleakala	Pan-STARRS 1	·	1.3 km	MPC · JPL
697981	2017 RM_{101}	—	August 31, 2017	Haleakala	Pan-STARRS 1	·	1.2 km	MPC · JPL
697982	2017 RK_{117}	—	September 1, 2017	Haleakala	Pan-STARRS 1	HNS	980 m	MPC · JPL
697983	2017 RE_{120}	—	September 2, 2017	Haleakala	Pan-STARRS 1	·	1.1 km	MPC · JPL
697984	2017 RK_{120}	—	September 14, 2017	Haleakala	Pan-STARRS 1	·	1.2 km	MPC · JPL
697985	2017 RR_{120}	—	September 15, 2017	Haleakala	Pan-STARRS 1	·	1.2 km	MPC · JPL
697986	2017 RT_{120}	—	February 9, 2016	Haleakala	Pan-STARRS 1	H	460 m	MPC · JPL
697987	2017 RV_{120}	—	September 14, 2017	Haleakala	Pan-STARRS 1	·	1.1 km	MPC · JPL
697988	2017 RD_{121}	—	September 14, 2017	Haleakala	Pan-STARRS 1	·	1.5 km	MPC · JPL
697989	2017 RP_{121}	—	September 3, 2017	Mount Lemmon	Mount Lemmon Survey	·	970 m	MPC · JPL
697990	2017 RS_{121}	—	September 14, 2017	Haleakala	Pan-STARRS 1	·	1.1 km	MPC · JPL
697991	2017 RX_{121}	—	September 14, 2017	Haleakala	Pan-STARRS 1	·	1.1 km	MPC · JPL
697992	2017 RF_{122}	—	September 1, 2017	Haleakala	Pan-STARRS 1	·	1.2 km	MPC · JPL
697993	2017 RT_{123}	—	September 1, 2017	Haleakala	Pan-STARRS 1	·	1.1 km	MPC · JPL
697994	2017 RU_{124}	—	September 14, 2017	Haleakala	Pan-STARRS 1	·	920 m	MPC · JPL
697995	2017 RF_{136}	—	September 2, 2017	Haleakala	Pan-STARRS 1	MAR	900 m	MPC · JPL
697996	2017 RX_{144}	—	September 1, 2017	Haleakala	Pan-STARRS 1	·	1.5 km	MPC · JPL
697997	2017 RB_{156}	—	September 12, 2017	Haleakala	Pan-STARRS 1	·	1.1 km	MPC · JPL
697998	2017 RA_{171}	—	September 15, 2017	Haleakala	Pan-STARRS 1	·	1.3 km	MPC · JPL
697999	2017 SM	—	January 18, 2012	Kitt Peak	Spacewatch	·	490 m	MPC · JPL
698000	2017 SJ_{1}	—	August 31, 2017	Haleakala	Pan-STARRS 1	·	1.3 km	MPC · JPL

back to top

== Meaning of names ==
As minor planet discoveries are confirmed, they are given a permanent number by the IAU's Minor Planet Center (MPC), and the discoverers can then submit names for them, following the IAU's naming conventions. The list below concerns those minor planets in the specified number-range that have received names, and explains the meanings of those names.

Official naming citations of newly named small Solar System bodies are approved and published in a bulletin by IAU's Working Group for Small Bodies Nomenclature (WGSBN). Before May 2021, citations were published in MPC's Minor Planet Circulars for many decades. Recent citations can also be found on the JPL Small-Body Database (SBDB). Until his death in 2016, German astronomer Lutz D. Schmadel compiled these citations into the Dictionary of Minor Planet Names (DMP) and regularly updated the collection.

Based on Paul Herget's The Names of the Minor Planets, Schmadel also researched the unclear origin of numerous asteroids, most of which had been named prior to World War II. This article incorporates text from this source, which is in the public domain: SBDB New namings may only be added to this list below after official publication as the preannouncement of names is condemned. The WGSBN publishes a comprehensive guideline for the naming rules of non-cometary small Solar System bodies.

Named minor planet	Provisional	This minor planet was named for...	Ref · Catalog
697402 Ao	2017 BX_{232}	Ao Manaka is a character in the comic/animation Asteroid in Love created by Japanese manga artist Quro.	IAU · 697402
