= 697402 Ao =

Main-belt asteroid

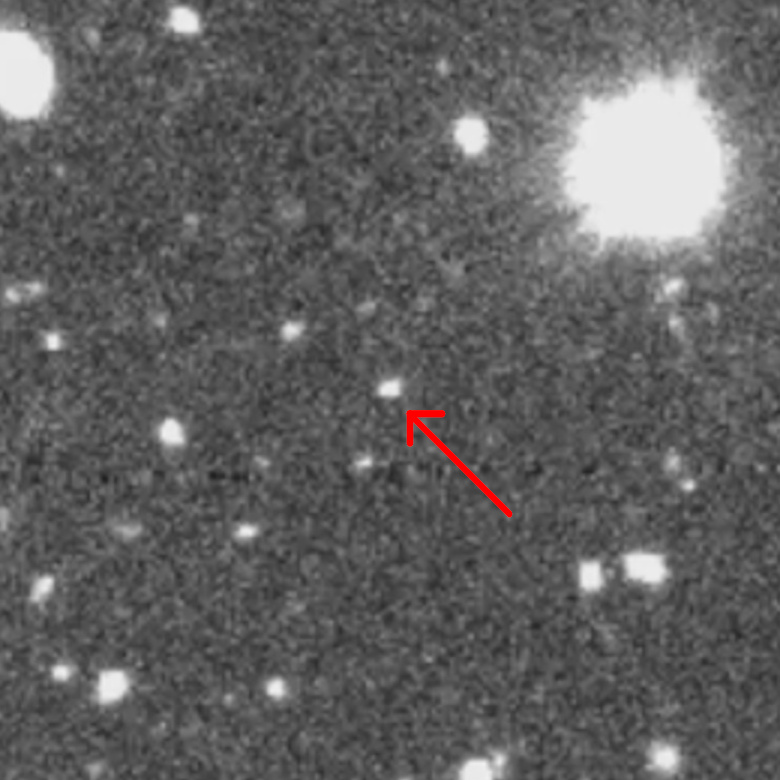

Discovery
- Discovered by: COIAS
- Discovery site: Maunakea
- Discovery date: 23 January 2017

Designations
- Named after: Ao Manaka (comic/animation character アオ Ao)
- Alternative designations: 2017 BX_{232}
- Minor planet category: main-belt

Orbital characteristics
- Epoch 31 March 2024 (JD 2460400.5)
- Uncertainty parameter 0
- Observation arc: 6654 days
- Aphelion: 3.518 AU
- Perihelion: 2.940 AU
- Semi-major axis: 3.229 AU
- Eccentricity: 0.0895423
- Orbital period (sidereal): 5.8 yr
- Mean anomaly: 327.27995°
- Mean motion: 0° 10^{m} 11.416^{s} / day
- Inclination: 8.94156°
- Longitude of ascending node: 190.52888°
- Argument of perihelion: 78.85772°

Physical characteristics
- Absolute magnitude (H): 17.09

697402 Ao (provisional designation 2017 BX_{232}) is an asteroid located in the outer main belt. It was discovered on 23 January 2017, by the citizen science project Come On! Impacting ASteroids (COIAS) using archival data from the Subaru Telescope, which was first reported to the Minor Planet Center in February 2024.

== Orbit ==
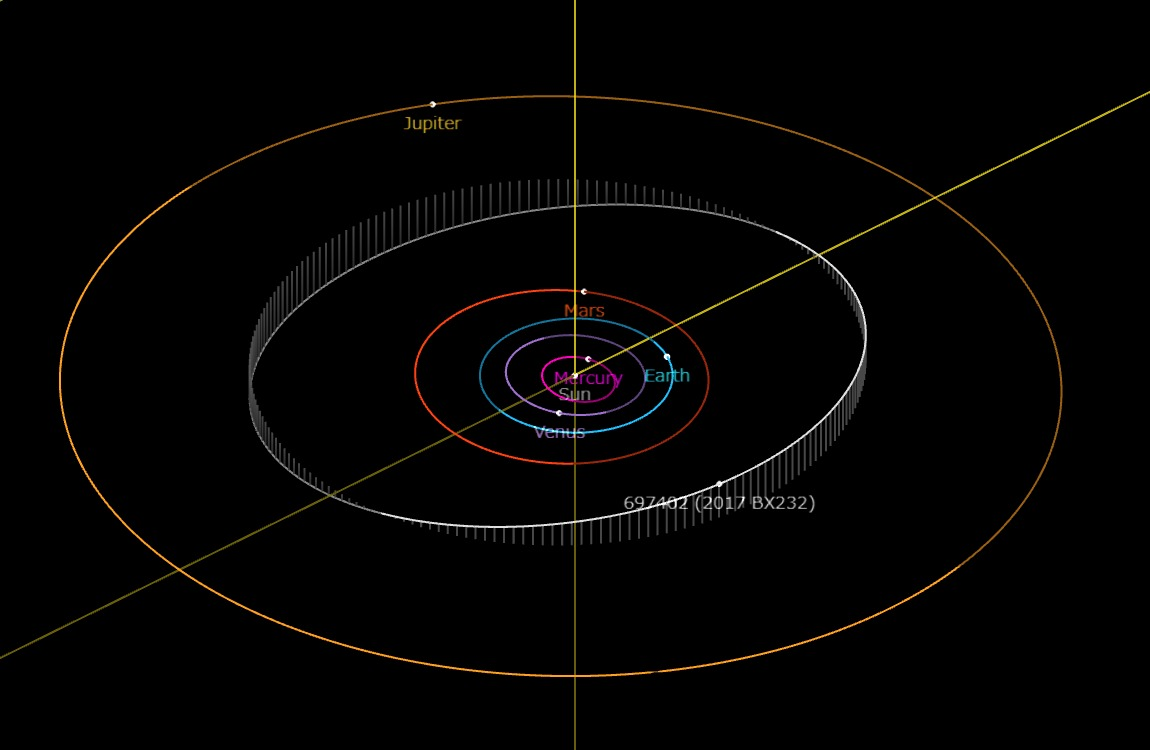
Orbit of 697402 Ao

Ao is an outer main belt asteroid in a heliocentric orbit with a semi-major axis of about 3.2 AU in a relatively circular orbit with an eccentricity of 0.09 and an inclination of about 9 degrees. It orbits the Sun every 5.8 years.

== Discovery and naming ==
Animation of the blinking images of asteroid 697402 Ao.

The first observation of Ao was on 25 March 2006 by Mt. Lemmon Survey. The asteroid was also observed and reported in later years. It was only in late 2016 and 2017 that it was observed for multiple nights in a single opposition, which is how the Minor Planet Center determines the discovery opposition. These observations made using the Subaru Telescope were not reported until February 2024, through the web-based citizen science project Come On! Impacting ASteroids (COIAS). Between 2017 and 2024, other observations were also made, none of which provided multiple-night observations in a single opposition. Multiple astrometric measurement reports through the COIAS project belonging to observations dated 2017 therefore became the earliest reports of multiple-night observations of the asteroid within a single opposition, determining the discovery observations. The asteroid was located in these images by using a digital blinking and moving object detection method.

After the astrometric measurements belonging to 2017 observations were identified to belong to the same object, a provisional designation 2017 BX_{232} was assigned to the object. After its orbital uncertainty parameter dropped to 0, the asteroid was numbered (697402). Discovery credit was assigned to Subaru Telescope and later to the citizen science project COIAS.

The COIAS development team and the citizen scientists who took part in the astrometric measurements of (697402) discussed the name. They decided to name the asteroid after the fictional character Ao Manaka, who appears as a main character in the manga and anime Asteroid in Love created by author Quro. This decision is explained in the naming citation as follows:

Ao Manaka is a character in the comic/animation Asteroid in Love created by Japanese manga artist Quro. Ao and her friends enjoy Earth Science Club activities in their high school with a dream of naming an asteroid "Ao". The work encouraged many readers to study Earth and planetary sciences with its accurate depiction of celestial objects and geology.
