= List of Is the Order a Rabbit? episodes =

Is the Order a Rabbit? is a 2014 anime television series produced by White Fox based on the manga of the same name written by Koi and serialized in Houbunsha's Manga Time Kirara Max magazine. The series follows a high school girl name Cocoa Hoto who begins living at the Rabbit House café and making new friends. The first season aired in Japan between April 10, 2014, and June 26, 2014, and was simulcast by Crunchyroll. The opening theme is "Daydream Café." by Petit Rabbit's (Ayane Sakura, Inori Minase, Maaya Uchida, Risa Taneda, and Satomi Satō), whilst the ending theme is "Poppin' Jump♪" (ぽっぴんジャンプ♪, Poppin Janpu) by Chimame-tai (Inori Minase, Sora Tokui, and Rie Murakawa). The ending theme for episode 12 is "Nichijou Decoration" (日常デコレーション, Nichijō Dekorēshon; lit. 'Everyday Decoration') by Petit Rabbit's. Sentai Filmworks have licensed the series in North America. A second season, co-produced by Kinema Citrus, aired between October 10, 2015, and December 26, 2015. The opening theme is "No Poi!" (ノーポイッ！, Nōpoi!) by Petit Rabbit's while the ending theme is "Tokimeki Poporon♪" (ときめきポポロン♪) by Chimame-tai. A third season, animated by Encourage Films, aired in Japan between October 10, 2020, and December 26, 2020. The opening theme is "Tenkū Cafeteria" (天空カフェテリア) by Petit Rabbit's while the ending theme is "Nakayoshi! Maru! Nakayoshi!" (なかよし！○！なかよし！) by Chimame-tai.

== Series overview ==
Season	Episodes	Originally released	
Season	Episodes	First released	Last released
1	12	April 10, 2014	June 26, 2014
2	12	October 10, 2015	December 26, 2015
3	12	October 10, 2020	December 26, 2020

== Episodes ==
=== Is the Order a Rabbit? (2014) ===
No.	Title	Directed by	Written by	Original release date
1	"I Knew at First Glance That It Was No Ordinary Fluffball"; Transliteration: "Hitome de Jinjō de nai Mofumofu da to Minuita yo" (Japanese: ひと目で尋常でないもふもふだと見抜いたよ)	Hiroyuki Hashimoto	Kazuyuki Fudeyasu	April 10, 2014
Upon arriving in a fancy European styled town, Cocoa Hoto comes across a café called the Rabbit House whilst looking for her accommodation, disappointed to find it is not actually a café filled with rabbits. She does take interest in a curiously shaped rabbit named Tippy, who appears to make weird human-like sounds when she pets it. Cocoa soon learns that the café is in fact the residence where she will be staying, its waitress, Chino Kafū, being the owner's granddaughter. Cocoa is soon put to work at the café in exchange for her accommodation, receiving training from another staff member, Rize Tedeza, whilst also trying her hand at latte art. Later that night, Cocoa and Chino spend the night getting to know each other, whilst Tippy, who can speak fluently, works alongside Chino's father at the bar.
2	"The Girl Who Loved Wheat and the Girl Loved by Azuki Beans."; Transliteration: "Komugi o Aishita Shōjo to Azuki ni Aisareta Shōjo" (Japanese: 小麦を愛した少女と小豆に愛された少女)	Daisuke Eguchi	Kazuyuki Fudeyasu	April 17, 2014
Cocoa goes around in circles trying to find her new school and ends up meeting a girl named Chiya Ujimatsu, who informs her the school entrance ceremony is actually the next day. Later, Cocoa teaches Chino, Rize, and Chiya how to bake fresh bread, coming up with some new ideas for the Rabbit House's menu. Afterwards, Chiya invites the other girls to her family's coffee shop, the Ama Usa An, which features some rather elaborately named menu items and another particularly unique rabbit mascot.
3	"Do You Remember the Day You First Got Drunk? You Tried to Light a Campfire in Your Own Home, Didn't You?"; Transliteration: "Hajimete Yotta Hi no Koto Oboeteru? Jibun no Ie de Kyanpufaiyā Shiyō to Shita Wayone" (Japanese: 初めて酔った日の事憶えてる？自分の家でキャンプファイヤーしようとしたわよね)	Shōgo Arai	Kazuyuki Fudeyasu	April 24, 2014
Cocoa, Chino, and Rize go shopping for some mugs for the café, where they meet Rize's underclassman, Sharo Kirima, who is in love with Rize. The next day, Chiya, whose coffee shop is right next to Sharo's house, becomes worried that Sharo may be working at a shady place and asks Cocoa and the others to investigate, finding it just to be a simple café, Fleur de Lapin, where they try out some herbal teas. Later, Sharo comes by the Rabbit House, becoming hyper after drinking some coffee, with everyone deciding to have a sleepover due to the rain, where Chiya scares everyone with her ghost stories.
4	"Your Lucky Items Are Vegetables, Crime, and Punishment."; Transliteration: "Rakkī Aitemu wa Yasai to Tsumi to Batsu" (Japanese: ラッキーアイテムは野菜と罪と罰)	Kōji Kobayashi	Mio Inoue	May 1, 2014
After hearing some remarks from Cocoa, Chino gets advice from her classmates, Maya Jōga and Megumi "Megu" Natsu, about how to grow taller. The next day, the girls try their hand at fortune telling, whilst Cocoa experiences some bad luck whilst spending time with Chiya and her rabbit, Anko. Later, the girls go to the library to study, as well as search for a book Chino is looking for.
5	"Cocoa and Murderous Intent Without Malice"; Transliteration: "Kokoa to Akuinaki Satsui" (Japanese: ココアと悪意なき殺意)	Masaki Matsumura	Kazuyuki Fudeyasu	May 8, 2014
Chino asks Rize to help her practise for a badminton tournament whilst Cocoa and Chiya practise volleyball, soon inviting Sharo to take part in a volleyball match. Later, Rize takes on additional jobs at both Ama Usa An and Fleur de Lapin so she can buy her father some vintage wine for Father's Day. After finding the wine to still be too expensive, Sharo helps Rize pick out an alternative present.
6	"A Story About Telling a Story"; Transliteration: "Ohanashi o Suru Ohanashi" (Japanese: お話をするお話)	Hiroyuki Tsuchiya	Mio Inoue	May 15, 2014
On their day off, Cocoa and Chino take a walk in the park, encountering the others along the way, where Cocoa meets a novelist named Aoyama Blue Mountain. The next day, Maya and Megumi come by the Rabbit House to help out and get to know Cocoa and Rize, leaving Chino a little bit jealous and lonely. Whilst lamenting at the Ama Usa An, Chino receives some sound advice from Aoyama, soon learning that Cocoa and Rize had similar feelings. Later, Aoyama explains to Cocoa about a certain café owner who inspired her to write her best-selling novel.
7	"Call Me Sister" (Japanese: Call Me Sister.)	Atsushi Nakayama	Kazuyuki Fudeyasu	May 22, 2014
After upsetting Chino by finishing a jigsaw puzzle she had been working on, Cocoa apologises by buying her a new 8000 piece puzzle, which the girls get together to solve. The next day, Chiya gets depressed after getting into a little fight with Sharo, so Cocoa helps the two make up with each other. Later, Rize and Sharo pass out flyers for their respective cafés, unaware that the flyers for Rabbit House sport a rather noticeable typo. That night, the other girls learn Sharo's secret that she is a poor scholarship student living next door to Chiya.
8	"Wet with Pool Water, Wet with Rain, Wet with Tears"; Transliteration: "Pūru ni Nurete, Ame ni Nurete, Namida ni Nurete" (Japanese: プールに濡れて 雨に濡れて 涙に濡れて)	Kōji Kobayashi	Kazuyuki Fudeyasu; Mio Inoue	May 29, 2014
The girls spend the day at a swimming pool, where Sharo teaches Rize how to swim. Later, the girls overcome tiredness and rainpour in order watch a movie based on Aoyama's book together.
9	"Aoyama Slump Mountain"; Transliteration: "Aoyama Suranpu Maunten" (Japanese: 青山スランプマウンテン)	Shōgo Arai	Mio Inoue	June 5, 2014
It is shown how a young Cocoa met Chino's grandfather, seemingly casting a spell to grant his wish of becoming a rabbit. Meanwhile, Rize is chosen as the heroine for a school performance of The Phantom of the Opera and seeks out Chiya for advice on how to become more ladylike, although in the end, her role ends up being scripted to her usual personality. Later, Aoyama, who has decided to quit writing, takes up a part-time job at the Rabbit House, becoming saddened when she hears Chino's grandfather had died. She explains that her slump came from losing a fountain pen that was given to her by Chino's grandfather, so Cocoa and Chino help to look for it. Upon finding the pen, Chino convinces Tippy, who possesses the soul of her grandfather, to encourage Aoyama, who is inspired to return to her writing career. However, being airheaded, she remains completely oblivious as to Tippy's true identity.
10	"The Anti-Sister Battle Corps, Also Known As the Chimame Corps"; Transliteration: "Tai Onē-chan-yō Kessen Butai, Tsūshō Chimame-tai" (Japanese: 対お姉ちゃん用決戦部隊、通称チマメ隊)	Ryōji Masuyama	Kazuyuki Fudeyasu	June 12, 2014
Cocoa stays over with Chiya to study for exams, while also helping out at the Ama Usa An in between. Megu and Maya also help out at the Rabbit House, where Chino starts to show signs that she misses Cocoa. After work, Chino and the girls head over to the pool, where they participate in a water gun fight and also run into Aoyama. Meanwhile, Sharo comes over to help Cocoa and Chiya with their studies and sleeps over with them.
11	"The Girl Dons a Red Coat and Drives a Team of Rabbits Across the Christmas Eve Night Sky"; Transliteration: "Shōjo wa Akai Gaitō o Matoi Usagi o Karite Seiya no Sora o Iku" (Japanese: 少女は赤い外套を纏いウサギを駆りて聖夜の空を行く)	Hiroyuki Tsuchiya	Mio Inoue	June 19, 2014
As the girls go to a Christmas Market to buy ornaments for the Rabbit House, they make plans to hold a Christmas party after everyone finishes work on Christmas Eve. As the guests arrive for the party, they help out around the Rabbit House when their special Christmas pancakes bring in a lot of business. After a successful work day, the girls get the party underway with food and presents. Later that night, Cocoa takes on the role of Santa Claus to try and sneak a present under Chino's pillow, but ends up falling asleep by her bed. Nonetheless, Chino is delighted with the present from her 'scatterbrained Santa'.
12	"For You, I Can Sleep Late"; Transliteration: "Kimi no Tamenara Nebō Suru" (Japanese: 君のためなら寝坊する)	Hiroyuki Hashimoto	Hiroyuki Hashimoto	June 26, 2014
Megu and Maya come to the Rabbit House to interview its employees for a school report, roping Cocoa into taking them to interview Chiya and Sharo at their workplaces. Later, Chino discovers Cocoa has a fever and puts her to bed, whilst Chiya also looks after Sharo who has her own fever. As Cocoa's fever worsens, Chino and Tippy go out into the snowy streets to borrow some medicine from Chiya, as theirs had run out. Cocoa recovers but Chino ends up getting sick with mumps instead, so Cocoa nurses her back to health.

=== Is the Order a Rabbit?? (2015–19) ===
No. overall	No. in season	Title	Directed by	Written by	Original release date
13	1	"Her Smile and Flash Are Annoying: That's My So-Called Older Sister"; Transliteration: "Egao to Furasshu ga Yakamashī, Kore ga Watashi no Jishō Ane Desu" (Japanese: 笑顔とフラッシュがやかましい これが私の自称姉です)	Hiroyuki Hashimoto	Kazuyuki Fudeyasu	October 10, 2015
Cocoa decide to take some photos to send to her family but Chino is camera-shy, with helps from the others Cocoa was able to take a photo of Chino ... sneering. Chino is upset that the Rabbit House is not feature in a local magazine, but later found out it was feature in the next edition, which lead to Cocoa finally taking a picture of Chino smiling.
14	2	"The Ash-Colored Rabbit and the Ash Princess"; Transliteration: "Haiiro Usagi to Haikaburi-hime" (Japanese: 灰色兎と灰かぶり姫)	Masahiro Shinohara	Kazuyuki Fudeyasu	October 17, 2015
Sharo asks Rize and Chiya to investigate a mysterious phenomenon in her house, which turns out to be the grey rabbit looking for a place to live. Naming the rabbit Wild Geese on Rize's suggestion, Sharo attempts to get over her fear of rabbits by befriending it. When an incident causes a sprain Rize had to worsen, the others visit her at home and dress up as maids to help out around the house. Feeling left out, Rize shows the girls her gun collection, after which they dress her as a maid so that she can join in the fun too.
15	3	"The Legendary Twirl Dancing Duck Squad"; Transliteration: "Kaiten Butō Densetsu Ahiru-tai" (Japanese: 回転舞踏伝説アヒル隊)	Seung-hui Son	Kazuyuki Fudeyasu	October 24, 2015
Chino, Meg, and Maya prepare for their school's arts festival, which involves drawings and dancing. The girls start by trying to draw various objects and people, revealing their unique drawing styles. Later, Chino starts taking ballet lessons from Megu's mother to prepare for her dance recital, which soon attracts the attention of the others.
16	4	"Cocoa-senpai's Elegant Tea Party Tutorial"; Transliteration: "Kokoa-senpai no Yūga na Ochakai Chūtoriaru" (Japanese: ココア先輩の優雅なお茶会チュートリアル)	Masayuki Iimura	Kazuyuki Fudeyasu	October 31, 2015
The girls celebrate moving up a grade, with Chino and her friends trying to act more grown ups. Anticipating Mocha's visit, Cocoa is determine to show her sister that she became a reliable older sister of her own.
17	5	"I Could Tell with One Bite That It's Just a Normal Chewy"; Transliteration: "Hitokuchi de Futsū no Mochimochi da to Minuita yo" (Japanese: ひと口で普通のもちもちだと見抜いたよ)	Masahiro Shinohara	Kazuyuki Fudeyasu; Mio Inoue	November 7, 2015
After getting distracted upon arriving in town and running into Aoyama Blue Mountain along the way, Mocha comes to the Rabbit House in a suspicious disguise while Cocoa is out searching for her. After eventually introducing herself to Chino and Rize, she delights them with her own bread recipe, while Cocoa becomes worried that her friends is being taken from her. Announcing that she'll be staying at the Rabbit House for a few days, Mocha spends the evening with Cocoa and Chino.
18	6	"Wood-Framed Town Mission Complete"; Transliteration: "Kigumi no Machi Misshon Konpurīto" (Japanese: 木組みの街攻略完了（みっしょんこんぷりーと）)	Hiroshi Ikehata	Kazuyuki Fudeyasu; Mio Inoue	November 14, 2015
The girls go on a picnic and end up having a boat race, where Cocoa becomes determined to beat Mocha only to lose to Chiya's team. Later, Cocoa tries to distance herself from Mocha to avoid looking spoiled in front of Chino, which in turn leaves Mocha feeling lonely. On the day, Mocha is going to her home more far away than Rabbit House, Cocoa and Chino gives Mocha a party.
19	7	"That Babyish Little Child Vanishes Like a Soap Bubble"; Transliteration: "Amaenbō na Ano Ko wa Shabondama no Yō ni Hakanaku Kieru" (Japanese: 甘えん坊なあの子はシャボン玉のように儚く消える)	Yūsuke Kamata	Kazuyuki Fudeyasu	November 21, 2015
With the café's washing machine broken, Cocoa and the others decide to do their laundry by hand. Later, the girls get together at Sharo's place for a curry party, where Chino fantasizes about adopting a more little sister-like personality.
20	8	"Sneaking Stalking Stalker Story"; Transliteration: "Sunīkingu Sutōkingu Sutōkā Sutōrī" (Japanese: スニーキングストーキングストーカーストーリー)	Shōgo Arai	Kazuyuki Fudeyasu	November 28, 2015
Chiya comes to Sharo after having a supposed fight with Cocoa, who simply didn't understand her vaguely hinted fears over potentially ending up in a Sharo-problem again. Coming to them for advice, Sharo joins Chino and Rize at a stationery store, while Cocoa and Chiya clear up their misunderstandings. Later, upon hearing that Megu wants to go to Rize and Sharo's school, Maya follows Rize as she stalks Blue, becoming stalked themselves by Sharo, who turns out to have been observed by Aoyama. Afterwards, as Chino and Meg follow Rize and Maya while Cocoa and Chiya follow them, Maya expresses her concerns over becoming separated from her friends, to which Rize assures her that being friends isn't limited to being together all the time.
21	9	"The Furball Launches a Suicide Attack and a Cruel Button is Fired"; Transliteration: "Kedama wa Tokkōshi Mujihi na Botan wa Hanatareru" (Japanese: 毛玉は特攻し無慈悲なボタンは放たれる)	Nozomi Imamura	Kazuyuki Fudeyasu	December 5, 2015
As the girls investigate whether the Rabbit House and Ama Usa An really had a rivalry with each other, they discover both cafés once collaborated on a coffee anmitsu dish. Later, as part of their school's work experience, Chino tries her hand at working at the Ama Usa An, while Maya and Meg work at the Rabbit House and Fleur de Lapin respectively. Noticing Chiya feeling lonely working all by herself, Chino encourages her to ask Sharo to work alongside her.
22	10	"A Day in Search of E"; Transliteration: "Ī o Sagasu Nichijō" (Japanese: Eを探す日常)	Kaori	Kazuyuki Fudeyasu	December 12, 2015
Rize invites Sharo to join her as she helps around her, where they learn about a legendary girl known as "Miss Emerald". The pair investigate the others for information on Miss Emerald, only learning that her name is Midori. Meanwhile, Cocoa and Chino learn from Aoyama's friend that her real name is in fact Midori. Later, Cocoa becomes upset when she assumes she wasn't invited to join everyone on a trip to the mountains, after they rejected her own invitations to go playing. The girls quickly manage to get Cocoa out of her funk and they all head to the mountains to what is Chino's first outdoor trip.
23	11	"Stardust Mayim Mayim"; Transliteration: "Sutādasuto Maimu Maimu" (Japanese: スターダスト・マイムマイム)	Yasuhiro Irie	Kazuyuki Fudeyasu	December 19, 2015
The girls arrive at their mountain cottage, quickly discovering they have to search for their own food and deciding to go fishing. After dropping the hat Cocoa gave her, Chino finds herself stuck on a sandbar in the river chasing after it, but is soon rescued by Rize. Later that night, the girls go camping outdoors, where they eat toasted marshmallows, dancing, and making wishes upon shooting stars.
24	12	"The Treasure is Your Decisive Moment"; Transliteration: "Takaramono wa Kimi no Ketteiteki Shunkan" (Japanese: 宝物は君の決定的瞬間)	Hiroyuki Hashimoto	Hiroyuki Hashimoto	December 26, 2015
Noticing a well-done picture she took of Cocoa during the trip, Chino becomes determined to take natural photos of the others. Later, while on a treasure hunt with Cocoa and Chino after they find a map in the café, Meg and Maya recall how they first became friends with Chino. Afterwards, Chino gives her thanks to Cocoa, revealing she was asked by Mocha to try and take some less goofy pictures of her. The next day, Chino and the others hide some more treasure for Cocoa and the other older girls to search for, while Mocha receives letters from Cocoa and Chino.
25	OVA1	"Dear My Sister"	Kaori; Kazuki Ōhashi; Masahiro Shinohara; Shōta Ihata	Koi; Hiroyuki Hashimoto	November 11, 2017 (theaters); May 30, 2018 (BD/DVD)
Cocoa returns home to visit Mocha and her mother. Meanwhile, Chino starts to feel lonely from Cocoa's absence, recalling how it just used to be just her and Rize. As Cocoa helps her family run their bakery, Chino prepares to go to a fireworks festival with the others. On the night of the festival, Cocoa arrives back in time to enjoy the fireworks with everyone.
26	OVA2	"Sing For You"	Hiroyuki Hashimoto	Kazuyuki Fudeyasu	September 26, 2019
Chino is chosen to sing a solo part for a school solo, so she asks the others to help train her to become less nervous. On the day of the recital, the girls show up in support of Chino, who manages to give a good performance.

=== Is the Order a Rabbit? BLOOM (2020) ===
No. overall	No. in season	Title	Directed by	Written by	Original release date
27	1	"The Magician at the Cafe of Smiles"; Transliteration: "Nikkori Kafe no Mahōtsukai" (Japanese: にっこりカフェの魔法使い)	Hiroyuki Hashimoto	Kazuyuki Fudeyasu	October 10, 2020
28	2	"The Case of the Childhood Friend's Stolen Heart"; Transliteration: "Osananajimi Hāto Gōdatsu Jiken" (Japanese: 幼馴染ハート強奪事件)	Masahiro Shinohara	Mio Inoue	October 17, 2020
29	3	"Everything in the World Serves as My Experience Points"; Transliteration: "Sekai no Subete wa Watashi no Keiken-chi" (Japanese: 世界のすべては私の経験値)	Masahiro Shinohara	Kazuyuki Fudeyasu	October 24, 2020
30	4	"A Potential Everyday Life"; Transliteration: "Atta Kamo Shirenai Nichijō" (Japanese: あったかもしれない日常)	Chuanfeng Xu	Kazuyuki Fudeyasu	October 31, 2020
31	5	"She is a Fierce Whirlwind, She is a Carefree Breeze"; Transliteration: "Kanojo wa Atsuki Senpū, Kanojo wa Kimamana Soyokaze" (Japanese: 彼女は熱き旋風 彼女は気ままなそよ風)	Yūma Imura	Mio Inoue	November 7, 2020
32	6	"A Fluffle of Rabbits is Also Most Welcome"; Transliteration: "Usagi no Dantai-san mo Dai-Kangei desu" (Japanese: うさぎの団体さんも大歓迎です)	Yōsuke Yamamoto	Mio Inoue	November 14, 2020
33	7	"We Shall Dance with Ghosts Until Dawn on this Halloween Night!"; Transliteration: "Kon'ya wa Yūrei to Datte Odori Akaseru Halloween Night!" (Japanese: 今夜は幽霊とだって踊り明かせる Halloween Night！)	Hitomi Efuku	Kazuyuki Fudeyasu	November 21, 2020
34	8	"Stamp, Sleep, Study, Smile"; Transliteration: "Sutanpu Surīpu Sutadi Sumairu" (Japanese: スタンプ スリープ スタディ スマイル)	Yoshinobu Kasai	Mio Inoue	November 28, 2020
35	9	"Chamomile with a Dash of Jealousy"; Transliteration: "Yakimochi Fūmi no Kamomīru" (Japanese: やきもち風味のカモミール)	Chuanfeng Xu	Mio Inoue	December 5, 2020
36	10	"A Request for Backup From a Full Heart"; Transliteration: "Hāto ga Ippai no Kyūen Yōsei" (Japanese: ハートがいっぱいの救援要請)	Keiei Yūzumi！	Kazuyuki Fudeyasu	December 12, 2020
37	11	"The Cafe of Smiles and the Rainbow Magician"; Transliteration: "Nikkori Kafe to Nanairo no Mahōtsukai" (Japanese: にっこりカフェと七色の魔法使い)	Yoshinobu Kasai	Kazuyuki Fudeyasu	December 19, 2020
38	12	"I Can Take That Step Forward Because You Are Watching"; Transliteration: "Sono Ippo wa Kimi o Mite Irukara Fumidaseru" (Japanese: その一歩は君を見ているから踏み出せる)	Masahiro Shinohara; Hiroyuki Hashimoto	Hiroyuki Hashimoto	December 26, 2020

== Home media release ==
=== Japanese ===
NBCUniversal Entertainment Japan (Japan, Region A / 2)
Vol.	Release date	Discs	Episodes	Ref.
Is the Order a Rabbit?
1	June 20, 2014	1	1–2	
2	July 24, 2014	1	3–4	
3	August 27, 2014	1	5–6	
4	September 26, 2014	1	7–8	
5	October 22, 2014	1	9–10	
6	November 27, 2014	1	11–12	
BOX	December 21, 2016	3	1–12	
Is the Order a Rabbit??
1	December 12, 2015	1	1–2	
2	February 14, 2016	1	3–4	
3	March 9, 2016	1	5–6	
4	April 8, 2016	1	7–8	
5	May 2, 2016	1	9–10	
6	June 3, 2016	1	11–12	
BOX	December 22, 2017	3	1–12	
OVA1	May 30, 2018	4	1	
OVA2	September 26, 2019	3	1	
Is the Order a Rabbit? BLOOM
1	December 25, 2020	1	1–2	
2	January 29, 2021	1	3–4	
3	February 26, 2021	1	5–6	
4	March 26, 2021	1	7–8	
5	April 28, 2021	1	9–10	
6	May 28, 2021	1	11–12	

=== English ===
Sentai Filmworks (North America, Region A / 1)
Vol.	Release date	Discs		Episodes	Ref.
Vol.	Release date	Blu-ray	DVD	Episodes	Ref.
Is the Order a Rabbit?
1	July 14, 2015	1	2	1–12	
Is the Order a Rabbit??
2	April 11, 2017	2	3	1–12	
Is the Order a Rabbit? BLOOM
3	March 1, 2022	2	—	1–12	
