= Hikaru Akao =

Japanese voice actress

- 赤尾 ひかる
- Born: June 16, 1995 (age 31); Saitama Prefecture, Japan
- Occupation: Voice actress
- Years active: 2015–present
- Agent: I'm Enterprise
- Notable work: Comic Girls as Kaoruko Moeta; Back Street Girls as Chika Sugihara; Lapis Re:Lights as Maryberry; Assault Lily as Riri Hitotsuyanagi; Gekidol as Seria Morino; Arknights as Bubble; Blue Archive as Koharu Shimoe
- Height: 146 cm (4 ft 9 in)
- Children: 1

Hikaru Akao (赤尾 ひかる, Akao Hikaru; born June 16, 1995) is a Japanese voice actress. Having aspired to become a voice actress since her early life, she entered a training school, and after graduating became affiliated with I'm Enterprise. She made her voice acting debut in 2016, and played her first lead role in 2018 as the character Kaoruko Moeta in the anime television series Comic Girls.

== Biography ==
During her sixth grade of elementary school, Akao watched the anime series Naruto on television. Although she had been familiar with the occupation of voice acting during that time, she did not initially wish to pursue that career as she "hated her voice". She became interested in broadcasting during her elementary years, so upon entering junior high school, she joined her school's broadcasting club. During this time, she began speaking during club events, which made her more confident in her voice and realized that she had fun using it.

During her second year of high school, she came across a pamphlet for a voice acting training school that had been delivered to her club. Although she initially did not want to pursue voice acting, she decided to give it a try as she thought that many people were aiming for that career. As the schedule of that training school was in conflict with her club activities, she decided to go to another school. She later studied at the Japan Narration Actor Institute, graduating in 2015.

After finishing her studies, Akao became part of I'm Enterprise in 2015. She began her voice acting career playing minor roles in anime series such as Love Live! Sunshine!! and Jinsei. She also became a host of a weekly radio program with fellow voice actors Sayaka Senbongi and Misaki Watada. In 2017, she played the role of Lulune Louie in Is It Wrong to Try to Pick Up Girls in a Dungeon?: Sword Oratoria as well as background roles in Alice & Zoroku and Kaitō Tenshi Twin Angel. In 2018, she played her first lead role as Kaoruko Moeta in Comic Girls. She played the role of Chika Sugihara in Back Street Girls. In 2022, Akao was one of the winners of the Best New Actress Award at the 16th Seiyu Awards.

On December 31, 2024, she announced on Twitter that she gave birth to a baby girl.

== Filmography ==
=== Anime ===
2016

- Love Live! Sunshine!! (Female student)
- Jinsei (Female student)

2017

- Is It Wrong to Try to Pick Up Girls in a Dungeon?: Sword Oratoria (Lulune Louie)
- Alice & Zoroku (Girl)
- Kaitō Tenshi Twin Angel (Girl B)

2018

- Märchen Mädchen (Upierzyca)
- Comic Girls (Kaoruko Moeta)
- Back Street Girls (Chika Sugihara)

2019

- Endro! (Yulia "Yuusha" Chardiet)
- Granbelm (Kibō Kohinata)
- Fire Force (Hinata & Hikage)

2020

- Smile Down the Runway (Ichika Tsumura)
- Lapis Re:Lights (Maryberry)
- Assault Lily Bouquet (Riri Hitotsuyanagi)

2021

- Gekidol (Seria Morino)
- Assault Lily Fruits (Riri Hitotsuyanagi)

2024

- Atri: My Dear Moments (Atri)

2025

- The Mononoke Lecture Logs of Chuzenji-sensei (Ryōko Ogawa)

=== Original video animation ===
2017

- Is the Order a Rabbit?: Dear My Sister (Girl)

2021

- Alice in Deadly School (Sayaka Murasaki)

=== Video games ===
2018

- Atelier Lydie & Suelle: The Alchemists and the Mysterious Paintings (Suelle Malen)
- Kirara Fantasia (Kaoruko Moeta)
- Magia Record: Puella Magi Madoka Magica Side Story (Riko Chiaki)
- Quiz RPG: The World of Mystic Wiz (Iyori, Nazuna)
- Girls' Frontline (Gr Mk23, QSB-91)

2019

- The Seven Deadly Sins: Grand Cross (Valkyrie Megellda)
- White Cat Project (Lice Pasla Oliva)
- Kemono Friends 3 (Huacaya alpaca)

2020

- Atri: My Dear Moments (Atri)
- Arknights (Bubble)

2021

- Assault Lily: Last Bullet (Riri Hitotsuyanagi)
- Blue Archive (Koharu Shimoe)

2026

- Girls' Frontline 2: Exilium (Basti)
