= Atri: My Dear Moments =

2020 Japanese visual novel by Frontwing and Makura

- Cover art
- Video game
- Developer: Frontwing; Makura (枕)
- Publisher: Aniplex.exe (Windows); iMel (Nintendo Switch, Android, iOS)
- Directed by: kur
- Produced by: Hiroki Shimada (Aniplex)
- Music by: Fuminori Matsumoto
- Genre: Visual novel
- Platform: Android; iOS; Microsoft Windows; Nintendo Switch
- Released: Windows: WW: June 19, 2020; Android, iOS, Nintendo Switch: JP: December 16, 2021
- Manga
- Written by: Jako
- Published by: Kadokawa Shoten
- Magazine: Comptiq
- Original run: October 7, 2022 – February 10, 2025
- Volumes: 5
- Anime television series
- Directed by: Makoto Katō
- Produced by: Yuki Kataoka; Kang Yue
- Written by: Jukki Hanada
- Music by: Fuminori Matsumoto
- Studio: Troyca
- Licensed by: NA: Aniplex of America
- Original network: Tokyo MX, GTV, GYT, BS11, AT-X
- Original run: July 14, 2024 – October 6, 2024
- Episodes: 13
- icon

Atri: My Dear Moments (stylized as ATRI -My Dear Moments-) is a 2020 visual novel game developed by Frontwing and Makura (枕) who are especially known for creating The Fruit of Grisaia visual novel, written by Asuta Konno who also wrote the If My Heart Had Wings visual novel and published by Aniplex.exe, a brand of Japanese anime and music production company Aniplex. The visual novel was digitally released on Steam for Windows on June 19, 2020, worldwide. Later, on December 16, 2021, the game was also released for Android, iOS and Nintendo Switch devices by iMel only in Japan.

A manga adaptation by Jako was serialized in Kadokawa Shoten's Comptiq magazine from October 2022 to February 2025, and an anime television series adaptation produced by Troyca aired from July to October 2024.

== Plot ==
The game is set in the near future where a sudden rise in sea levels floods the majority of the world and ends human civilization as we know it, forcing humanity to eke a living on what little dry land remains. The protagonist, Natsuki Ikaruga, is a young man who lost his mother and one of his legs in an accident, relying on a prosthetic to walk. Prior to the events of the game, he dropped out from the academy and returned to his hometown where he reunited with his friends Minamo Kamishiro and Ryuuji Nojima. On one day, Natsuki rummages through his recently deceased grandmother's belongings to pay off a debt, only to awaken a young android girl named Atri who claims to only have 45 days to partner with Natsuki and has a task to do. Natsuki later arrives at a local school and overcomes the electricity shortage by making a homebrew water turbine. Over the course of the next few weeks Natsuki discovers that his late grandmother, an ocean geologist, had proposed artificial floating islands "Eden" as a solution to the sea level rising problem, as well as developing a romantic relationship with Atri. However, Natsuki reads through her log and reveals in dismay that all the emotions Atri shows are artificially computed by software. He eventually orders Atri to stop acting as if she had consciousness.

Unknown to Natsuki is that Atri indeed has self consciousness and possesses true emotions, despite still writing log files in old fashion. Her old owner was Shiina Yachigusa, Natsuki's mother. Shiina was constantly bullied by her classmates, which resulted in Atri assaulting her classmates in irritation. The incident soon led to a product recall and disposal for Atri's model, but Atri managed to break free and continue to protect Shiina and the new-born Natsuki. During the fatal accident, she accepted the order from the dying Shiina that transfers Atri's ownership to Natsuki, and rescued him. Soon after, she was put to hibernation by Natsuki's grandmother, who wanted her to become the central management system of Eden once it was completed. At the time of being salvaged she only had 45 days before ceasing function permanently.

News of the existence of Atri soon attracts Yasuda, student of the creator of Atri who devoted his life into research of artificial consciousness but lost all his fame and reputation due to the recall. Yasuda decides to disintegrate Atri in revenge and is confronted by Atri herself. In the bad ending of the game, Natsuki fails to stop Atri, who kills Yasuda, loses all her memories and emotions and ceases operation two days after. In the good ending of the game, Natsuki reverts his previous order, allowing Atri to express her feelings at will and persuades Yasuda. Shortly after, Natsuki takes Atri to Eden and puts her into hibernation at the central control unit the day before her stipulated obsolescence. A third ending named "True ending" takes place sixty years after Atri's integration with Eden. Natsuki marries Minamo and returns to the academy, bringing self-conscious artificial intelligence to the world. His grandmother's proposed artificial islands are also widely adopted. Natsuki, lying on his deathbed and learning that Eden will be sunk the next day, uploads his conscious to Eden. He awakens Atri in the virtualized world and decides to spend their final day together.

== Characters ==
=== Main characters ===
Natsuki Ikaruga (斑鳩夏生, Ikaruga Natsuki)
Voiced by: Kensho Ono
Atri (アトリ, Atori)
Voiced by: Hikaru Akao

=== Supporting characters ===
Minamo Kamishiro (神白水菜萌, Kamishiro Minamo)
Voiced by: Minami Takahashi
Ryuuji Nojima (野島竜司, Nojima Ryuuji)
Voiced by: Yoshimasa Hosoya
Catherine (キャサリン, Kyasarin)
Voiced by: Yoko Hikasa
Ririka Nanami (名波凜々花, Nanami Ririka)
Voiced by: Anzu Haruno

== Music ==
The original soundtrack of the game was digitally released on October 28, 2020. At the same day, the original soundtrack CD was also released which included the original game disc. The soundtrack album contains 20 tracks composed by Fuminori Matsumoto, and also includes the full version of opening theme song "Light Across the Seas" by Mami Yanagi and ending theme song "Dear Moments" by Hikaru Akao.

== Other media ==
=== Manga ===
A manga adaptation illustrated by Jako was serialized in Kadokawa Shoten's Comptiq magazine from October 7, 2022, to February 10, 2025. Five volumes were released from September 8, 2023, to March 10, 2025.

==== Volumes ====
No.	Release date	ISBN
1	September 8, 2023	978-4-04-113502-0
2	January 10, 2024	978-4-04-114453-4
3	July 10, 2024	978-4-04-115197-6
4	October 10, 2024	978-4-04-115429-8
5	March 10, 2025	978-4-04-116058-9

=== Anime ===
In September 2022, during the Aniplex Online Fest 2022 event, an anime television series adaptation was announced. It is produced by Troyca and directed by Makoto Katō, with scripts written by Jukki Hanada, animation character designs by Michio Satō, and music composed by Fuminori Matsumoto. The series aired from July 14 to October 6, 2024, on Tokyo MX and other networks. (Note: Tokyo MX lists the series premiere on July 13, 2024, at 24:00, which is effectively July 14 at midnight JST.) The opening theme song is "Ano Hikari" (あの光; That Light) performed by Nogizaka46, while the ending theme song is "Yes to No no Aida ni" (YESとNOの間に; Between YES and NO) performed by 22/7. Aniplex of America licensed the series and streams it on Crunchyroll.

==== Episodes ====
No.	Title	Directed by	Storyboarded by	Original release date
1	"To the Cradle in the Ocean"; Transliteration: "Mino Yuri Kago e" (Japanese: みのゆりかごへ)	Makoto Katō	Makoto Katō	July 14, 2024
In the near future, the world's sea levels have suddenly risen without explanation, flooding all of the coastal regions and slowly flooding more land every year. Natsuki Ikaruga is a young man trying to build a submarine so he can recover treasure from the now submerged home of his grandmother, marine geologist Nonko Yachigusa. After repairing the submarine, he sets out with his business partner Catherine and childhood friend Minamo Kamishiro. Exploring the home, Natsuki discovers a female Humanoid, a human-like android, named Atri. Natsuki reveals that Nonko, who was Atri's master, died a month prior due to illness, so Atri designates Natsuki as her new master. Natsuki considers selling Atri so he can purchase a new prosthetic leg for himself, but she requests not to be sold until she fulfills Nonko's final order to her, though she has forgotten what it was. Catherine decides to keep an eye on Atri until she can find a buyer for her, but Natsuki remains conflicted. That night, after having another nightmare of losing his leg in an accident, Natsuki wakes up to find Atri at his side, who declares that she will be his leg.
2	"A Warm View Together"; Transliteration: "Atatakana Keshiki o Futari de" (Japanese: 暖かな景色をふたりで)	Marie Watanabe & Makoto Katō	Makoto Bessho & Makoto Katō	July 21, 2024
Atri tells Natsuki that she and Catherine were forced to split up due to debt collectors chasing the latter, so Atri decided to return to him. However, due to being too human-like, Atri turns out be inept at performing household chores, leading Natsuki to once again consider selling her. Minamo then arrives and insists that Natsuki keep Atri. Natsuki then recovers more items from Nonko's home, but other than revealing she was studying the rising sea levels, they don't learn anything that could reveal what Nonko's final order to Atri was. Minamo suggests that Atri visit their school to see if that would jog her memory, and takes her to her home. She tells Atri how Natsuki dreamed of becoming an astronaut, but was rejected due to his missing leg which has left him disheartened ever since. Minamo is also confident that Natsuki won't sell Atri, and advises her to simply stay by his side. Natsuki reluctantly tolerates her presence and shows her around the island they live on, eventually taking her to see the school, which is partially flooded. Atri appears disheartened at seeing the school in its dilapidated state, but hides it from Natsuki and Minamo.
3	"Hitman Small Fry School"; Transliteration: "Hittoman・Zako・Sukūru" (Japanese: ヒットマン・ザコ・スクール)	Yuri Hagiwara, Daishou Miyagi & Makoto Katō	Hiroki Hayashi	July 28, 2024
Natsuki buys Atri a notebook as a gift and takes her inside the school, where they find out that since all of the island's teachers have already left for the mainland, only Minamo is left to teach three of the local children, Ririka, Toru, and Miyo. They also meet another island resident, Ryuuji, who looks down on Natsuki for not doing anything to help improve the lives of the islanders. On the way home, Minamo suggests Natsuki could help out by becoming a volunteer teacher like her. That night, Atri realizes she left her notebook at the school and insists to Natsuki they go back to retrieve it. They manage to find the notebook, but also discover that Ririka and Ryuuji live in the school building since their homes were flooded by the rising ocean. Seeing how Ririka and Ryuuji are forced to live without electricity, Natsuki comes up with the idea to use tidal power to generate electricity for the school, and he knows a place where he can find the necessary materials to build a turbine.
4	"Crabs and Electricity are Important"; Transliteration: "Kani to Denki wa Daiji" (Japanese: カニとデンキは大事)	Yuri Hagiwara, Daisho Miyagi & Makoto Katō	Shoko Shiga	August 4, 2024
Natsuki and Atri go on a diving expedition to recover parts and resin from Ryuuji's family factory. Atri also catches a number of crabs. so everybody decides to have a barbeque. Later, Natuki and Ryuuji get into a debate on how to build the tidal power generator, with Natsuki admitting Ryuuji is more intelligent than he thought and Ryuuji apologizing for thinking Natsuki didn't care about others. That night, Natsuki wonders if a Humanoid is human enough, whether they should be treated as humans. Catherine then returns and takes Minamo hostage, intending to sell Atri and take all of the profit for herself. Atri instead punches Catherine despite the fact Humanoids are supposed to be incapable of attacking humans, and Catherine flees. Minamo finds Catherine's dropped ID and discovers her true identity is Hanako Osada, a local grade-school teacher. Natsuki and Ryuuji continue their attempt to build the generator, but have difficulty finding batteries. One of the island's merchants mentions that an anonymous buyer is offering an extremely high price for Atri, leading Natsuki to wonder what is so special about her. Atri offers to sell herself or donate her own battery, but Natsuki turns her down, realizing that she would be sad if she were to be separated from him.
5	"Smiling Under the Night Light"; Transliteration: "Yorutō no Naka de Waratte" (Japanese: 夜灯の中で笑って)	Tamagawa Haruka	Miyuki Kuroki	August 11, 2024
Natsuki wakes up in the middle of the night to find a drunk Catherine washed up on the dock, so he brings her inside his boat. However, the boat is assaulted by a group of thugs looking to kidnap Atri, but she, Natsuki, and Catherine are able to defeat them, though Atri experiences some type of flashback that alarms her. Seeing that the leader of the thugs is the merchant who was acting on a client's orders, Natsuki coerces him into paying off Catherine's debt and giving him his supply of batteries in return for letting him go. Before Catherine can leave, Natsuki suggests that she return to the school to teach the children still there. Seeing that her students are still trying to attend classes, Catherine agrees to stay. Natsuki the others continue their work on the tidal power generator and finally manage to complete it. The group is overjoyed when the generator restores the school's electricity. When Minamo breaks down in tears of joy, Atri points out she cannot show happiness that way since she cannot cry. Natsuki then reminds her that she can just show her happiness through smiles instead.
6	"That Song In My Head"; Transliteration: "Boku no Atama no Naka no Uta" (Japanese: 僕のあたまの中の歌)	Arou Morita & Makoto Katō	Makoto Katō	August 18, 2024
With electricity restored to the school, more and more students begin to return to class, though Ryuuji surmises that some students, especially the female ones, are attending solely to get close to Natsuki. After school, Natsuki, Minamo, and Ryuuji start a new salvage business to recover people's personal items lost underwater. On a salvage expedition, Ryuuji advises Minamo in private to confess her feelings to Natsu before one of the other female students beats her to it. Ryuuji arranges an opportunity for Minamo to be alone with Natsuki, and he confides to her that all of his observations point to Atri exhibiting real human emotions, which means he should start treating her like a human. Minamo concludes Natsuki isn't interested in romance right now, but Ryuuji isn't convinced. Together with Catherine, they convince one of the female students, Yoko, to test Natsuki. Under pressure, Natsuki admits he had a crush on an older girl when he was a child. Based on Natsuki's description of her, Minamo and Ryuuji realize the girl was actually Atri. Atri claims she doesn't remember meeting Natsuki back then, but her memories appear to be jogged when she hears Natsuki playing the piano. However, when Minamo and Ryuuji ask Natasuki about Atri, he remarks the girl couldn't be Atri because she had a completely different personality. Upon returning home, Atri reveals she recovered her memories about Natsuki when she sings the song he was playing on the piano, confirming she is the girl he had a crush on.
7	"Date With a Robot Girl"; Transliteration: "Roboko・Za・Dēto" (Japanese: ロボ子・ザ・デート)	Yasumi Mikamoto & Makoto Katō	Hiroki Hayashi	August 25, 2024
Natsuki remains in denial that Atri is the girl he had a crush on despite all the evidence indicating otherwise. However, when she recounts a vague memory of encountering him while he was in a wheelchair at the cliff, Natsuki is forced to admit the possibility. He then wonders if Atri is truly capable of feeling emotion, and Catherine cautions that if her emotions are genuine, that can pose a potential danger which is likely why advanced Humanoids like her were recalled in the past. Natsuki continues to try to test if Atri has emotions by asking if she loves him, but she doesn't understand his question. Catherine then decides to try to teach Atri the difference between "like" and "love". After class, Atri invites Natsuki out to a date, and they travel around the island while secretly being followed by the men that attempted to kidnap Atri earlier. On their way home, Natsuki concludes that Atri really does have a heart, and the two of them kiss.
8	"The Rippling Night Has Come"; Transliteration: "Namiutsu Yoru ga Kite" (Japanese: 波打つ夜が来て)	Tamagawa Haruka	Hiroki Hayashi	September 1, 2024
Natsuki becomes conflicted about kissing Atri, wondering if their feelings for each other are genuine or not. He reveals his anxiety to Minamo, Ryuuji, and Yoko, and they advise him to confront his feelings about Atri. After school, Minamo further encourages Natsuki to pursue his feelings Atri as she is working hard to earn his approval. Ryuuji and Yoko then approach after Natsuki leaves, asking if it is really okay for her to bury her own feelings for Natsuki, but Minamo replies that Natsuki seems much happier with Atri. At the boat, Natsuki continues to grapple with his feelings about Atri, and finally concludes that they should stay as friends for now to give Atri more time to learn about love and other emotions. Later that night, Natsuki wakes up to find Atri having fallen asleep while writing in her diary. He decides to read her diary and is horrified to see that her line of thought still mirrors that of a machine, showing how she keeps modifying her behavior and speech according to what Natsuki wants to see and hear. Believing that Atri has been manipulating him all this time, Natsuki rejects her and yells at her to stay away from him.
9	"A Leg Falling Into the Abyss"; Transliteration: "Shinen ni Ochiru Ashi" (Japanese: 深淵に落ちる足)	Minori Mizuno	Ei Aoki	September 8, 2024
Thinking Atri is lying to him, Natsuki orders Atri to suppress her emotions and asks her if she really loves him or not, and she replies she dislikes him in his current form. Natsuki suffers a mental breakdown, flees, and collapses on the road. Ryuuji and Ririka find him and bring him to Minamo's house. Minamo correctly guesses Natsuki had a fight with Atri, and points out that humans have to learn to socialize through trial and error just like here. This causes Natsuki to rethink his stance on Atri and he heads to the school the next day. However, Catherine reveals that someone dropped off the factory recall report for Atri's model, stating that Atri went berserk and seriously injured a student, which triggered the recall of all 4th generation Humanoids. Natsuki is then approached by Yasuda, a former employee of the factory that built Atri. He explains Atri's recall destroyed the reputation of her inventor, Professor Konishi, causing him to die in disgrace. He wants to destroy Atri to bring justice to Konishi and gives Natsuki an older notebook Atri wrote, which reveals she was the property of a girl named Shiina. Natsuki tries to talk to Atri again, but is convinced she has no heart and isolates himself in his submarine. When he returns to his boat, he finds a note by Ririka informing him she took Atri to attend to an emergency at the school. He then finishes reading Atri's old notebook and realizes Atri went berserk out of love for Shiina. Meanwhile, Yasuda forces Atri to hand herself by threatening Ririka's friends, and begins beating her to force her to go berserk again to prove she is violent. Realizing his mistake, Natsuki confronts Yasuda to rescue Atri.
10	"Eventually When the Rain Stops"; Transliteration: "Yagate Ame wa Yande" (Japanese: やがて雨は止んで)	Tamagawa Haruka & Makoto Katō	Ei Aoki & Makoto Katō	September 15, 2024
Yasuda begins torturing Natsuki to provoke a reaction from Atri, who uses her superior strength to beat him into submission. She then asks Natsuki to destroy her since she is defective. Natsuki refuses and acknowledges Atri has a heart. This causes her to recall her memories of Shiina and she breaks down in tears, which was thought to be impossible. The next day, Natsuki reveals that Shiina was his mother, and when he saw tear stains in Atri's journal, he was sure that Atri was capable of feeling love and sorrow. Natsuki and Atri reaffirm their feelings for each other, and Atri falls asleep and recalls her memories of Shiina. 31 years ago, Atri was originally purchased by Nonko as a caretaker for Shiina. Both girls got a long well, and Atri learned many of her habits from Shiina. However, after entering middle school, Shiina was relentlessly bullied by one of her classmates to the point where she considered jumping off the school's roof. To protect Shiina, Atri knocked out the bully who was egging her on to jump. Shocked at this, Shiina called Atri a monster. Afterwards, Atri escaped from the authorities and secretly kept watch over both Shiina and Natsuki until Nonko erased her memories and sealed her in her lab. Natsuki then takes Atri back to the cliff where they first met, where Natsuki reveals Shiina always regretted pushing away Atri and wished to be reunited with her. Realizing Shiina still loved her, Atri breaks down in tears while Natsuki comforts her.
11	"The End of Summer and Your Sound"; Transliteration: "Zan Natsu no Shirase to Kimi no Oto" (Japanese: 残夏のしらせと君の音)	Kazuya Kito & Yasumi Mikamoto	Shoko Shiga, Makoto Kato, Hiroki Hayashi & Minori Mizuno	September 22, 2024
Natsuki announces to the school and his friends that he plans to return to the mainland to finish his education at the Academy. However, instead of studying to be an astronaut like he originally wanted, he will focus his studies on Humanoids to learn better ways to build relationships between them and humans. Atri has also decided to accompany Natsuki to the mainland as well. Everybody supports their decision and plan for a big farewell party. However, that night, Atri suddenly malfunctions and shuts down. Studying the manual, Natsuki believes the issue is Atri's battery running low on power, but it can only be recharged by her original manufacturer. Without power, Atri will eventually lose all of her memories and shut down permanently. Everybody tries to find a solution but fail to come up with anything until Natsuki remembers that the capsule Atri was stored in must have a way of keeping her battery charged. He recovers the capsule from Nonoko's lab and it successfully recharges Atri. However, when she reawakens, Atri reveals she finally remembers Nonko's final order to her.
12	"A Ticket to the Place We Promised"; Transliteration: "Yakusoku no Chi E no Kippu" (Japanese: 約束の地への切符)	Hiroki Hayashi	Hiroki Hayashi	September 29, 2024
Atri reveals that she is supposed to be the key to "Eden", but doesn't actually know anything about it besides the general direction it is supposed to be. Natsuki, Atri, and their friends set out on an expedition to search for Eden, but fail to find anything. Upon returning to the island, Ririka informs them that she recalled reading a newspaper article mentioning "Project Eden", which was spearheaded by Nonko. Natsuki then recalls accidentally coming across a strange structure in the ocean and heads out to sea once again. Upon encountering a strange fog, Natsuki and Atri head underwater in the submarine to investigate. They encounter a heavy ocean current that sweeps them away. Natsuki later awakens to find himself on Eden itself, a self sufficient artificial island Nonko built in secret. He reunites with Atri and they investigate Eden's control center, where they find another pod. Upon realizing Nonko intends to use Atri as the core for Eden, he tries to leave with Atri, only for an AI copy of Nonko to stop him. Nonko explains that Eden is humanity's best hope for surviving the rising sea levels, and that she installed a failsafe in Atri that will wipe her memory 45 days after her reactivation, meaning she only has 3 days left. Natsuki again tries to leave, only for Atri to disobey his order.
13	"Stop, Time... You are Beautiful"; Transliteration: "Tokiyo Tomare, Omae wa Utsukushī" (Japanese: 時よ止まれ、おまえは美しい)	Makoto Kato & Minori Mizuno	Makoto Kato, Ei Aoki & Hiroki Hayashi	October 6, 2024
Natsuki convinces Atri to give him some more time to figure out a workaround. He and his friends spend the next day trying to find solutions, but Atri approaches him and tells him that she wants to help everybody of her own free will, which eventually convinces him to let her go. On the second to last day, everybody holds a farewell birthday party for Atri to celebrate her departure as well as the 33rd anniversary of her Humanoid model line. Natsuki then takes Atri back to Eden where he has a heartfelt farewell with Atri, who tells him that once he's ready, he can come back and free her so they can spend her last day together. Atri then integrates herself into Eden, which activates and begins supplying power to the island. Seventy years later, the combination of the Amaterasu rocket launches, construction of additional Edens, and reintroduction of Humanoids has allowed humanity to overcome the rising sea levels. Ririka is now a retired astronaut who watches her granddaughter pilot the latest Amaterasu rocket. Catherine is bedridden in her old age while being visited by her former students. Ryuji and Yoko have married and their granddaughter is dating a Humanoid. Minamo has become the mayor of the island while her granddaughter presides over the retirement ceremony of the first Eden. When Eden is shut down, Atri finds herself in a virtual world with Natsuki, who explains that thanks to his research, he is known as the man who gave Humanoids human rights. With Eden's retirement, he transferred both his and Atri's consciousnesses into the virtual world so that they can spend their final day together in eternity.

== Reception ==
The anime's entry in The Encyclopedia of Science Fiction notes that the it "a fairly good anime, though it has some problems". The reviewer praised it for its engaging, emotionally driven story and its exploration of science fiction themes such as identity, VR, artificial intelligence, and climate catastrophe. However, he also noted shortcomings in its underdeveloped world-building, occasionally unmemorable characters, and an uncomfortable dynamic stemming from the protagonists' perceived age gap.
