= Comic Girls =

Japanese manga series by Kaori Hanzawa

- Cover of Comic Girls volume 1 by Houbunsha, featuring (clockwise from center) Kaoruko, Tsubasa, Koyume and Ruki

こみっくがーるず (Komikku Gāruzu)
- Genre: Comedy, slice of life, CGDCT
- Manga
- Written by: Kaori Hanzawa
- Published by: Houbunsha
- Magazine: Manga Time Kirara Max
- Original run: March 2014 – February 2023
- Volumes: 9
- Anime television series
- Directed by: Yoshinobu Tokumoto
- Written by: Natsuko Takahashi
- Music by: Kenichiro Suehiro
- Studio: Nexus
- Licensed by: Crunchyroll
- Original network: Tokyo MX, BS11, Kansai TV, AT-X
- Original run: April 5, 2018 – June 21, 2018
- Episodes: 12
- icon

Comic Girls (こみっくがーるず, Komikku Gāruzu) is a Japanese four-panel manga series written and illustrated by Kaori Hanzawa. It made its first appearance in Houbunsha's Manga Time Kirara Max magazine with the May 2014 issue. An anime television series adaptation produced by Nexus aired in Japan between April and June 2018.

== Plot ==
Kaoruko Moeta, a yonkoma manga artist who goes by the pen name "Kaos", is a freshman in high school. After her manga ranks at the bottom of a reader survey, her editor recommends that she enter a special dormitory for manga artists. Kaoruko's roommates are shōjo manga artist Koyume Koizuka, teen romance manga artist Ruki Irokawa, and shōnen manga artist Tsubasa Katsuki. The girls support each other as they work to create their best manga series.

== Characters ==
Kaoruko Moeta (萌田 薫子, Moeta Kaoruko) / Kaos (かおす, Kaosu)
Voiced by: Hikaru Akao
A shy 4-koma manga artist who moves into the Bunhousha Dormitory to improve her manga. As she looks much younger than she is, her appearance often becomes the butt of jokes and a target of others' affection.
Koyume Koizuka (恋塚 小夢, Koizuka Koyume) / Koisuru Koyume (恋スル小夢)
Voiced by: Kaede Hondo
A shōjo manga artist who struggles with drawing boys. She develops a crush on Tsubasa. She has no experience with romance, so she is always nervous about the quality of her romantic manga and the nature of her "strange" feelings for Tsubasa as another girl.
Ruki Irokawa (色川 琉姫, Irokawa Ruki) / Big Boobies♥Himeko (爆乳♥姫子, Bakunyū♥Himeko)
Voiced by: Saori Ōnishi
A serialized teens' love manga artist. She originally wanted to draw cute animal manga for children, but her ability to draw big-breasted women led to her drawing erotic manga.
Tsubasa Katsuki (勝木 翼, Katsuki Tsubasa) / Wing V (ウィング・V, Wingu Bui)
Voiced by: Rie Takahashi
A serialized shōnen manga artist with a boyish appearance. She will often put herself in the role of one of her characters when working on her manga. Because of her handsome appearance, other girls often fall in love with her making her very popular in school, the most notable example of which is Koyume. She comes from a rich family, keeping her hair long and adopting a different personality while at home.
Ririka Hanazono (花園莉々香, Hanazono Ririka)
Voiced by: Aya Endō
The housemother at the Bunhousha Dormitory, who is a former yuri manga artist.
Mayu Amisawa (編沢 まゆ, Amisawa Mayu)
Voiced by: Minami Tsuda
Kaoruko's editor.
Miharu Nijino (虹野 美晴, Nijino Miharu)
Voiced by: Ayaka Nanase
The strict homeroom teacher of Kaoruko's class and a former yaoi manga artist.
Suzu Fūra (怖浦 すず, Fūra Suzu)
Voiced by: Reina Ueda
A horror manga artist who enjoys the screams of others.
Haruko Moeta (萌田 はる子, Moeta Haruko)
Voiced by: Mamiko Noto
Kaoruko's mother.
Miki Irokawa (色川 美姫, Irokawa Miki)
Voiced by: Hina Kino
Ruki's younger sister.
Nyaos (にゃおす, Nyaosu)
Voiced by: Hikaru Akao
A cat who is taken in by the dorm residents due to its similarities to Kaos.

== Media ==
=== Manga ===
Comic Girls is a four-panel series written and illustrated by Kaori Hanzawa. It made its first appearance in Houbunsha's seinen manga magazine Manga Time Kirara Max with the May 2014 issue, and began serialization in the magazine with the August 2014 issue. The series ended serialization in the April 2023 issue released on February 17, 2023.

No.	Release date	ISBN
1	April 27, 2015	978-4-8322-4566-2
2	April 27, 2016	978-4-8322-4687-4
3	June 27, 2017	978-4-8322-4849-6
4	March 27, 2018	978-4-8322-4931-8
5	April 25, 2019	978-4-8322-7085-5
6	April 27, 2020	978-4-8322-7187-6
7	March 26, 2021	978-4-8322-7263-7
8	March 25, 2022	978-4-8322-7355-9
9	March 27, 2023	978-4-8322-7447-1

=== Anime ===
A 12-episode anime television series adaptation produced by Nexus aired in Japan between April 5 and June 21, 2018. The series is directed by Yoshinobu Tokumoto, with series composition by Natsuko Takahashi, character designs by Keiko Saito, and music by Kenichiro Suehiro. The opening and ending themes are respectively "Memories" and "Namida wa Misenai" (涙はみせない, I Can't Show You My Tears), both performed by Comic Girls (a group formed by Hikaru Akao, Kaede Hondo, Saori Ōnishi, and Rie Takahashi). The series was simulcast by Crunchyroll worldwide except for in Asia and parts of Europe.

No.	Title (Note: All English titles are taken from Crunchyroll.)	Original release date
1	"I Got the Worst Results on the Survey?!"; Transliteration: "Ankēto Biri desu ka!?" (Japanese: アンケートビリですか!?)	April 5, 2018
After getting terrible results on a survey, Kaoruko Moeta, a yonkoma manga artist who goes by the pen name Kaos, moves into the Bunhousha Women's Dormitory for manga artists to improve her manga. Upon arriving, Kaoruko is acquainted with her new roommate, a shōjo manga artist named Koyume Koizuka who struggles with drawing boys, before meeting serialized authors Ruki Irokawa and Tsubasa Katsuki. Later that night, Kaoruko and Koyume learn about how Ruki wanted to draw children's manga, but wound up drawing raunchy teens' love manga instead, before assisting Tsubasa in finishing up her shōnen manga in time for her deadline.
2	"Back to School"; Transliteration: "Kyō Kara Gakkō deshita" (Japanese: 今日から学校でした)	April 12, 2018
Ruki and Tsubasa take Kaoruko and Koyume to the city to buy new art supplies. The girls soon begin their new semester at an all-girls school with Koyume ending up in a different class from the others, and Kaoruko struggles with being surrounded by new classmates.
3	"Jiggle Jiggle Bounce"; Transliteration: "Punipuni Poyon desu ne" (Japanese: プニプニポヨンですね)	April 19, 2018
As Kaoruko struggles with writing a gourmet manga, the girls decide to hold a sketching contest to help improve her drawing. To this end, Ruki has Koyume model for her, leading to an awkward conversation about breast size. Feeling inferior compared to the other girls, Kaoruko ends up skipping meals to work on her storyboard and collapses as a result. To help her get better, dorm mother Ririka Hanazono contacts Kaoruko's parents in order to make her some comfort food. However, Kaoruko's latest manga still fails to be approved.
4	"Scuffling Wildly Rendezvous"; Transliteration: "Kunzu Hoguretsu Randevū" (Japanese: くんずほぐれっランデヴー)	April 26, 2018
The girls become concerned with Ruki pulling consecutive all-nighters, so they try to help her with her erotic manuscripts. Finding the content too extreme to help with, Kaoruko instead teaches Ruki how to make digital art on her new computer. After her manga goes on sale, Ruki panics when her editor asks her to hold an autograph session. After some encouragement from both Tsubasa and Ririka, Ruki manages to face the event, becoming delighted to meet all of her fans.
5	"Amisawa-san, Do You Cosplay?"; Transliteration: "Amisawa-san Kosupure surun desu ka?" (Japanese: 編沢さん コスプレするんですか?)	May 3, 2018
Koyume brings everyone to the beach, only to find that the others seem more interested in practicing their drawing than playing in the sea, although they are eventually convinced to have fun. Afterwards, Ruki goes clothes shopping with Koyume, quickly picking up on her crush on Tsubasa and suggesting they go on a date to an amusement park together. While not being able to confess, Koyume does receive some comfort from Tsubasa over her concerns that she is falling behind everyone.
6	"I'll Go Shave All My Hair Off!"; Transliteration: "Marugari ni Shitekimasu" (Japanese: 丸刈りにしてきます)	May 10, 2018
Kaoruko becomes scared by a ghostly figure, who turns out to be Suzu Fūra, a horror manga artist who quickly takes a liking to the way she screams. While initially afraid of Suzu's unique behavior, Kaoruko soon notices her hidden beauty and befriends her. Later, homeroom teacher Miharu Nijino, who is a secret otaku who likes to cosplay, questions Tsubasa over sleeping in class, becoming surprised to learn she is the author of her favorite manga.
7	"Is This Heaven!?"; Transliteration: "Koko wa Tengoku desu ka!?" (Japanese: ここは天国ですか!?)	May 17, 2018
Kaoruko, feeling inadequate over Koyume getting serialized, attempts to help Suzu with her manga, despite how gory its contents are. Later, Kaoruko goes on her own to buy some computer glasses, but soon gets help from the others after her appearance draws attention from a police officer.
8	"Woof Meow Meow Woof Festival"; Transliteration: "Wan Nyan Nyan Wan Matsuri" (Japanese: わんにゃんにゃんわんまつり)	May 24, 2018
As Kaoruko feels depressed over her storyboards continuously getting rejected, she and the others try to study for their tests. Meanwhile, as Kaoruko's editor Mayu Amisawa worries that she is being too hard on her, she and Miharu come over to the dorm to drink with Ririka, observing Kaoruko's efforts first-hand.
9	"Kaospiral"; Transliteration: "Kaosupairaru" (Japanese: かおスパイラル)	May 31, 2018
As Koyume's first serialization begins publication, Tsubasa goes out with the other girls to get inspiration for a slice-of-life chapter for her manga. Later, Koyume worries that she has gained weight and desperately tries to lose it, which starts to have an effect on her manga. After that problem is resolved, Tsubasa loses her manuscript at school, prompting the girls to search for it, only to stumble upon Miharu's old yaoi manuscripts instead.
10	"It's Not Fair That Michiru Gets All The Love"; Transliteration: "Michiru Bakkari Aisarete Zurui" (Japanese: みちるばっかり愛されてずるい)	June 7, 2018
In the run-up to Christmas, Ruki feels downhearted over the lack of romance in her real life, so the gang throw her a surprise birthday party on Christmas Eve. Unable to go home due to her parents vacationing in Hawaii, Kaoruko spends New Year's at Tsubasa's home, where she discovers Tsubasa is from a rich family. Later, Ririka holds an event in which the dorm residents burn their unwanted storyboards to cook sweet potatoes.
11	"My Life Has Reached Its Peak"; Transliteration: "Jinsei no Pīku ga Kitan desu" (Japanese: 人生のピークがきたんです)	June 14, 2018
Needing to fill in an additional choice on their career surveys at school, the girls discuss what careers they might have if they weren't manga artists, learning that Ririka used to be a manga artist but couldn't handle living up to expectations. Later, in preparation for the dorm's imminent closure for the winter, the girls sort through storage containing much reference material from former residents that encourages Kaoruko to try harder. As Kaoruko presents multiple ideas during her next editor's meeting as a result, Mayu takes a liking to a story she wrote based on her experiences in the dorms, which finally gets approved as an insert manga.
12	"Farewell, You Wonderful Manga Artists"; Transliteration: "Itterasshaimase Rippa na Mangaka-sama-tachi" (Japanese: いってらっしゃいませ 立派な漫画家様たち)	June 21, 2018
Despite getting a good response on the first part of her manga, Kaoruko struggles with the second part, which is due on the day the dorm closes. With the other girls having to return home early, Kaoruko is forced to try and finish her manga all alone. It is then she is visited by her mother, who reminds Kaoruko of how much she has changed since first taking an interest in drawing. This, along with texts from her friends, encourages Kaoruko to finish her manga on time, which is praised by Mayu as her best work yet. As the dorm reopens in the spring, Kaoruko reunites with the other girls to once again draw manga together.

=== Video game ===
Characters from the series appear alongside other Manga Time Kirara characters in the 2018 mobile RPG, Kirara Fantasia.
