= Kanamemo =

Japanese manga and anime series

- Cover of Kanamemo volume 1 as published by Houbunsha

かなめも
- Genre: Comedy, slice of life, yuri
- Manga
- Written by: Shoko Iwami
- Published by: Houbunsha
- Magazine: Manga Time Kirara Max
- Original run: April 19, 2007 – October 19, 2013
- Volumes: 6
- Anime television series
- Directed by: Shigehito Takayanagi
- Written by: Rika Nakase
- Music by: Yukari Hashimoto
- Studio: Feel
- Licensed by: NA: Maiden Japan
- Original network: AT-X, TV Aichi, TV Hokkaido, TV Osaka, TV Setouchi, TV Tokyo
- Original run: July 5, 2009 – September 27, 2009
- Episodes: 13

Kanamemo (Japanese: かなめも) is a Japanese four-panel comic strip written and illustrated by Shoko Iwami (石見翔子). The strip has been serialized in Houbunsha's seinen manga magazine Manga Time Kirara Max since April 19, 2007. It is about Kana Nakamachi and her growing experience as a newspaper deliverer, cook, and orphan.

The anime adaptation premiered in Japan on July 5, 2009, by Feel.

== Plot ==
The story centers on Kana Nakamachi, a middle-school girl who had already lost her parents and just recently lost her only remaining relative, her grandmother. As a result, she ends up living and working at a newspaper delivery office. Everyone else living at the office are all charming, self-assertive bishōjo.

The manga follows Kana's daily life in the fast-paced yet joyous environment.

== Characters ==
Kana Nakamachi (中町 かな, Nakamachi Kana)
Voiced by: Aki Toyosaki
Kana is the main protagonist of the story, a young girl of thirteen years old. After the death of her parents, she is an orphan living with her grandmother. At the beginning of the story her grandmother also passes away. When repo-men come to repossess the grandmother's belongings, Kana assumes she is being repossessed too and runs away. Her search for a new lodging leads her to the Fuhshin Gazette, where she now lives.
Kana is a particularly soft spoken and shy girl who also gets frightened a lot, particularly in the presence of Haruka. She also tends to generally overreact to things she doesn't quite understand and frequently misinterprets them. Having lost her grandma, she sometimes gets rather lonely whenever she realizes she will inevitably have to leave the Fuhshin Gazette. However, she is willing to prove herself and do what she needs to help the paper. Although she is sometimes clumsy and not generally skilled at various things, she is rather good at cooking.

Saki Amano (天野 咲妃, Amano Saki)
Voiced by: Kaoru Mizuhara
Saki is the assistant chief of Fuhshin Gazette, despite still being in elementary school. She is the only "serious" one of the group, and frequently reprimands the other girls when they neglect their duties. However, she often helps Kana with her problems, including stepping in when Haruka becomes too invasive, and is also prone to giving spontaneous rewards to everyone else, even though she always justifies her actions in the format of "We were (fill in the blank), anyway." Although having a mental disposition of a mature adult, she will sometimes act like a polite child in order to befriend classmates and convince their parents to buy subscriptions.

Yume Kitaoka (北岡 ゆめ, Kitaoka Yume)
Voiced by: Ryou Hirohashi
Yume is an energetic girl with a taste for sweet things. For the most part, she is carefree and consistently in a good mood, sometimes to the point of annoyance in people around her. She is a student at a patisserie academy, and, whenever cooking, often adds far too much sugar than what the recipe calls for (such as when she added two bags of sugar to a dish of curry). She and Yuuki are a couple, albeit an odd one. She is obsessed with doing everything with Yuuki, and is severely disappointed when they are denied the opportunity.

Yuuki Minami (南 ゆうき, Minami Yūki)
Voiced by: Aya Endo
Yuuki is a tall shy girl and Yume's girlfriend and soulmate. Her emotional state is usually placid, except when Yume is doing something with someone else without her. She and Yume share an expressive yuri love, even kissing in public occasionally. When it comes to Yume's affections, Yuuki is very territorial, emitting a dangerous aura whenever Yume is doing something fun without her.

Hinata Azuma (東 ひなた, Azuma Hinata)
Voiced by: Eri Kitamura
Hinata is a carefree girl who likes to gamble or invest through various means, such as Horseracing and the stock market, but is otherwise hesitant about spending money on things such as cotton candy at a festival, claiming it to be "just a bunch of sugar". She has attempted to join a college numerous times, but has failed entrance exams twice, with a third failure being predicted frequently by the others. She is nice to Kana, occasionally helping her. Like Saki, she too will stop Haruka when she becomes invasive of Kana's space. Interesting of note is her unique usage of the masculine pronoun "I" ("boku") when referring to herself, where a female Japanese speaker would usually refer to herself using "watashi" or the more feminine "atashi".

Haruka Nishida (西田 はるか, Nishida Haruka)
Voiced by: Yui Horie
Haruka is a mature blue-haired girl who wears glasses. She is an avid drinker of sake, and as such is often drunk. She attends college, studying bio-fermentation, and creates numerous different beverages from biologic substances (the resulting concoction almost always being alcoholic). She is a self-proclaimed lolicon with a fetish for young girls under 15, often making various advances on Kana, who fears her greatly in this regard.

Mika Kujiin (久地院 美華, Kujiin Mika)
Voiced by: Rie Kugimiya
Mika delivers newspapers at another center, although she won't admit it unless directly confronted. She is quick to blame others, and frequently turns her mistakes into inconveniences. When she becomes lost during a route, she literally runs into Kana, then forgives her by "allowing" her to escort her to her next stop, later becoming friends. She seems to have a crush on Kana, and gets riled up at the thought of Kana having a boyfriend. In the manga, Mika has feelings for Kana and Kana in turn has strange feelings for Mika like the enjoyment of seeing Mika wallow in nervous waiting.

=== Other characters ===
Marimo (まりも, Marimo)
Voiced by: Mikako Takahashi
Marimo is a minor character who appears in the eighth and twelfth episodes. She is a former Fuhshin Gazette employee before she graduated from college, and has a reputation as the worst employee the newspaper company ever had. Nevertheless, she was well liked by everyone. She and Saki shared a special friendship, although Saki rarely likes to bring it up. Following her work at Fuhshin Gazette, she lives off of odd jobs, such as selling vegetables in the flea market for outrageously cheap prices. When she is not working, she will, according to her words, "go where the wind takes her, where her mood takes her".

Fumi (文)
Voiced by: Yumika Osaka
Kana and Mika's friend and classmate.

Nao (直)
Voiced by: Momoko Ohara
Kana and Mika's other friend and classmate.

Ōtsuka (大塚)
Voiced by: Asami Shimoda
Another classmate and friend of Kana and Mika.

Bunta (ぶんた, Bunta)
Bunta is a stray cat that hangs around the Fuhshin Gazette. She is treated as a member of the family, and is often a form of encouragement for Kana.

Kaniko Echizen (越前 かにこ, Echizen Kaniko)
Kaniko is a robotic representation of the manga artist, Shoko Iwami, who appears in omake chapters of the manga and as a transition effect that spouts nonsensical things in the anime.

Ken (ケン)
Voiced by: Yuka Iguchi
A friend and classmate of Saki.

== Media ==
=== Manga ===
The original manga by Shoko Iwami was serialized in Houbunsha's Manga Time Kirara Max magazine from April 19, 2007, to October 19, 2013. Six tankōbon volumes have been released:

No.	Release date	ISBN
1	September 2008	978-4-8322-7725-0
2	April 2009	978-4-8322-7791-5
3	October 2009	978-4-8322-7844-8
4	November 2010	978-4-8322-7960-5
5	December 2012	978-4-8322-4242-5
6	November 2013	978-4-8322-4371-2

=== Anime ===
An anime television adaptation by Feel was announced in the March 2009 issue of Houbunsha's Manga Time Kirara Max magazine. The series aired in Japan between July 5, 2009, and September 27, 2009, and was simulcast by Crunchyroll. The opening theme is "Kimi e to Tsunagu Kokoro" (君へとつなぐココロ, Connectings Heart With You) by Aki Toyosaki, Kaoru Mizuhara and Rie Kugimiya whilst the ending theme is "Yahho! Kanamemo ver." (YAHHO!! かなめもVer.) by Yui Horie. The series is licensed in North America by Maiden Japan.

==== Episode list ====
No.	Title	Original air date
1	"My First Time, All Alone..."; Transliteration: "Hajimete no, Hitoribocchi..." (Japanese: はじめての、ひとりぼっち…)	July 5, 2009
After her grandmother passes away, Kana Nakamachi runs away from home when people come to repossess her grandmother's belongings. As Kana searches for a place she can work at with room and board, she passes by the Fuhshin Shinbun newspaper delivery office, though is initially scared off by the curious people there. After Kana has several failed attempts at finding a suitable place, one of Fuhshin's employees, Yume Kitaoka, accidentally hits her with her bike and brings her back to the Fuhshin Shinbun to recover. As Kana asks for a job, the young assistant chief, Saki Amano, upon hearing about Kana's situation, agrees to let her stay.
2	"My First Paper Delivery"; Transliteration: "Hajimete no, Shinbun Haitatsu" (Japanese: はじめての、新聞配達)	July 12, 2009
As Kana starts her first day at the Fuhshin Shinbun, Saki takes her around town to show her the delivery route. It is soon brought to attention that Kana doesn't know how to ride a bike, so Yume and the other employees, Yuuki Minami, Haruka Nishida and Hinata Azuma, attempt to teach her how to ride one, with not much success. As Saki allows Kana to do her first delivery on foot, she gets stuck in the rain and meets another newspaper delivery girl.
3	"My First Smile"; Transliteration: "Hajimete no, Sumairu" (Japanese: はじめての、スマイル)	July 19, 2009
Kana starts going to summer classes and finds that the girl she met before, Mika Kujiin, has joined her class. Saki explains to Kana about how putting on a smile helps get subscribers, but when Kana tries to smile, the results are horrifying. As Saki realizes Mika is working for a rival newspaper, she has Kana tag along with her to scare off potential subscribers with her smile. After a string of failures, Mika decides to help Kana practice her smile. After getting a satisfactory one, they still end up not getting any subscribers but manage to become friends on a first name basis. Afterward, Kana shows her new smile to her co-workers, who find it hilarious.
4	"My First Day at the Pool"; Transliteration: "Hajimete no, Pūru" (Japanese: はじめての、プール)	July 26, 2009
After becoming intrigued by some coupons to a water park that Saki confiscates, Yume and the others take Kana with them to buy a swimsuits so they can visit the pool together. However, their hopes are soon dashed when they are reminded by Saki that they all have different days off. As a compromise, Yume suggests that everyone do their work in their swimsuits to keep the spirit, attracting subscribers in the process. Mika decides to follow suit to catch up with the competition and inspires Kana to conquer her embarrassment. As a thanks for getting many subscribers, Saki finds a garden pool for the girls to swim in.
5	"My First Time at the Bath with Everyone"; Transliteration: "Hajimete no, Minna de Ofuro" (Japanese: はじめての、みんなでお風呂)	August 2, 2009
As a typhoon hits the city, the gang make a bunch of teru teru bozu to ward off the weather, even making a big one. During the eye of the storm, they decide go to a public bath house, along with Mika, it being her first time. Despite occasional harassment from Haruka, Kana and Mika enjoy their stay. However, by the end, the eye has passed and they end up being shut in.
6	"My First Ghost Story"; Transliteration: "Hajimete no, Kowai Hanashi" (Japanese: はじめての、恐い話)	August 9, 2009
As the girls make their way back through the typhoon, picking up Mika along the way, Kana runs into some of her classmates, who neglected to tell Kana about a cake they were making for their teacher as they didn't want to bother her following her grandmother's death. As the gang board up the office for the storm, the power goes out, which scares Kana, especially when everyone starts telling ghost stories. Later, as the girls escort Kana to her room, they are all touched on the legs by an unknown presence which freaks them out. However, as the power goes back on, it is simply revealed to be a group of cats that Saki let shelter from the rain. As the staff soon have to deal with the delays to deliveries caused by the typhoon, Kana's classmates invite her to help deliver their cake to the teacher.
7	"My First Welcome"; Transliteration: "Hajimete no, Omukae" (Japanese: はじめての、お迎え)	August 16, 2009
On the day of the Obon, the girls decide to hold a celebration in honor of Kana's grandmother. As they hold the ritual, Kana recalls fond memories of going to the Bon Festival with her grandmother. Afterward, the girls head out to the Bon Festival, participating in many activities. Kana ends up encountering a small girl, who has her take her all around the festival before supposedly disappearing. As the day comes to an end, Kana wonders if that girl was perhaps the spirit of her grandmother.
8	"My First Talk About Memories"; Transliteration: "Hajimete no, Omoidebanashi" (Japanese: はじめての、思い出話)	August 23, 2009
The gang recall about a girl named Marimo who worked at Fuhshin Shinbun until a year ago. Despite being the worst employee ever in Saki's eyes, the others had the feeling Saki was pretty attached to her. A while back during a snowy day, Hinata searches for Marimo only to find her bike crashed and a pile of newspapers leading to the river. Hearing the news, Saki goes out in search for her, and she is eventually found by Marimo. Embarrassed by the story, Saki gives everyone a pay cut. When Kana hears that Marimo left after that day, she becomes concerned about when she'll have to leave too. Meanwhile, Saki still has fond memories of Marimo.
9	"My First Diet?"; Transliteration: "Hajimete no, Daietto?" (Japanese: はじめての、ダイエット?)	August 30, 2009
As Kana is shocked to find she has gained weight, Yume, Yuuki and Hinata decide to help put her on a day. Hinata gives Kana a dog costume so she can sweat more during her rounds, but she soon gets in trouble with a dog called Jon. After being rescued by Mika, they run into Jon's owner, Sacchan, a friend of Kana's, who asks them to look after him for the day while her family are away. With help from Yume, Yuuki and Hinata, Kana and Mika take Jon to the park, where Mika manages to get over her initial hesitation. Mika tells Kana about how she used to have a dog, but had to leave her behind when she moved. After returning Jon to his owners, Mika feels a bit lonely but feels happy in the knowledge that her old dog is being treated the same way. Kana, however, ends up completely forgetting about her diet.
10	"My First Feelings"; Transliteration: "Hajimete no, Kimochi" (Japanese: はじめての、気持ち)	September 6, 2009
Kana returns from her morning run to find Yume going off in a limo, leaving behind some salty cookies. She is told by the others that Yume is from a noble family and went home. Yuki appears to be taking it pretty hard, and Kana can't help but make assumptions about what's really happening. This leads her to become paranoid around anything that might upset Yuki. However, she soon finds out that Yuki had been crying because she had kept putting off going to a dentist and Yume had just gone to a memorial service. However, the whole ordeal has made Kana feel a bit lonely herself. The next morning, though, she encounters Mika and after buying some soup, she feels better.
11	"My First Time Nursing"; Transliteration: "Hajimete no, Kanbyō" (Japanese: はじめての、看病)	September 13, 2009
As rainy weather settles in, Yuki ends up catching a fever. When Yume takes over her shift, she ends up overworking herself and getting sick as well, though they both soon get better after 'sweating it off' together. The next day, however, Saki catches a fever instead, so Kana decides to look after her, although not all of her help is appreciated. Soon afterward though, Kana catches a cold as well and is forced by the others to rest. As Kana has nightmares about the others leaving her behind, she wakes up to find Saki sleeping next to her. As Saki tells her that she still has a role in the Fuhshin Shinbun, Kana wonders if she is simply being protected by the others.
12	"The First Person"; Transliteration: "Hajimete no, Hito" (Japanese: はじめての、ひと)	September 20, 2009
As the gang participate in a flea market in order to raise money for an air conditioner. Kana is still feeling a bit lonely when tales about Marimo spring up. When Kana is asked to get change during the lunch break, Mika offers to help out at her booth. Just then, Kana bumps into Marimo, and ends up having to help her sell vegetables. After selling all the goods at a cheap price, Marimo leads Kana to a special viewing point under an olive tree, where Marimo alleviates some of Kana's fears. Despite not getting Marimo's name, Kana returns with a smile on her face, albeit facing several paycuts for skipping work.
13	"And, The First..."; Transliteration: "Soshite, Hajimete no..." (Japanese: そして、はじめての…)	September 27, 2009
As the Fushin Shinbun prepares to interview newcomers, Kana attempts to learn how to ride a bike so she can be a good senpai. As Kana runs into Mika in the park, they decide to have an imaginary bike race that soon ends in imaginary tragedy. Noticing she has almost filled her diary, Kana finds a cute pink one, only to find it is too expensive. As Kana rejects Yume's offer of buying it for her without reason, the gang devise a plan involving making her do menial chores as an excuse to give her the amount required as a bonus. Accepting this bonus pay, Kana buys her new diary and awaits the new employees.
