= Clean Freak! Aoyama-kun =

Japanese manga series

- Cover of the first tankōbon volume, featuring Aoyama

潔癖男子！青山くん (Keppeki Danshi! Aoyama-kun)
- Genre: Comedy, sports
- Manga
- Written by: Taku Sakamoto
- Published by: Shueisha
- English publisher: Shueisha (digital)
- Imprint: Young Jump Comics
- Magazine: Miracle Jump; (2014); Weekly Young Jump; (2015–2018)
- Original run: May 20, 2014 – January 4, 2018
- Volumes: 13
- Anime television series
- Directed by: Kazuya Ichikawa
- Produced by: Shuusuke Katagiri; Takanori Matsuoka; Souji Miyagi; Takema Okamura; Yoshiyuki Shioya; Yoshihiro Suzuki
- Written by: Midori Gotou
- Music by: Hiroaki Tsutsumi; Tomotaka Osumi
- Studio: Studio Hibari (animation); TMS Entertainment (production)
- Licensed by: NA: Ponycan USA; SEA: Medialink
- Original network: Tokyo MX, ytv, BS11
- English network: SEA: Animax Asia
- Original run: July 2, 2017 – September 17, 2017
- Episodes: 12
- icon

Clean Freak! Aoyama-kun (Japanese: 潔癖男子！青山くん, Hepburn: Keppeki Danshi! Aoyama-kun) is a Japanese manga series written and illustrated by Taku Sakamoto. It was first serialized in Shueisha's seinen manga magazine Miracle Jump in 2014, and was transferred to Weekly Young Jump, where it ran from 2015 to 2018, with its chapters collected in thirteen tankōbon volumes. An anime television series adaptation by Studio Hibari aired from June to September 2017.

== Plot ==
A first-year student, Aoyama, is a genius soccer player who is also obsessed with cleanliness.

== Characters ==
=== Fujimi High School ===
==== Soccer club ====
Aoyama (青山)
Voiced by: Ryotaro Okiayu
Aoyama is a first-year student and has competed in U16 matches before becoming a midfielder of the soccer club. He is a clean freak due to his mysophobia, which resulted in his unique style of playing soccer involving extremely cautious physical contact with other players and the ball. He also cleans the clubroom and soccer balls after school. He is popular among the students and often garners many spectators during club activities, causing Kaoru Zaizen to become annoyed. Aoyama chooses Fujimi High School for its "uniqueness", which turned out to be having bidets installed in its toilets.
Kaoru Zaizen (財前 かおる, Zaizen Kaoru)
Voiced by: Tomokazu Seki
Kaoru Zaizen is a rich kid who was the playmaker before Aoyama's arrival. He is the only person who could not get used to his eccentricities. While not good with his kick despite being a midfielder, Kaoru is good at using his head literally.
Moka Gotō (後藤 もか, Gotō Moka)
Voiced by: Anzu Haruno
Moka Gotō is a student known for having a crush on Aoyama since elementary. She is good at lock picking and wields a baseball bat designed with nails and cute stickers as her weapon to protect him. After the soccer club members found out about her secretly cleaning their clubroom, Moka becomes their manager.
Kazuma Sakai (坂井 一馬, Sakai Kazuma)
Voiced by: Sōichirō Hoshi
Kazuma Sakai is a no-nonsense defender with leadership qualities and good friends of Jin Tsukamoto and Taichi Yoshioka.
Jin Tsukamoto (塚本 仁, Tsukamoto Jin)
Voiced by: Daisuke Sakaguchi
Jin Tsukamoto is a defender and is always seen wearing red-framed glasses. He cheers up the soccer club by playing a soccer ball with his butt. Jin reveals that he got bullied by his former soccer club captain named Ryō Kadomatsu because of his habit, which resulted in his fear of him.
Taichi Yoshioka (吉岡 太一, Yoshioka Taichi)
Voiced by: Hiroyuki Yoshino
Taichi Yoshioka is a gentle defender known for his love of eating and always seen together with Kazuma Sakai and Jin Tsukamoto.
Gaku Ishikawa (石川 岳, Ishikawa Gaku)
Voiced by: Noriaki Sugiyama
Gaku Ishikawa is the soccer club captain and the only player with a girlfriend. He joins Aoyama's fan club since his girlfriend is a member.
Hikaru Tada (多田 光, Tada Hikaru)
Voiced by: Daisuke Kishio
Hikaru Tada is a narcissistic midfielder who viewed himself as a level above Aoyama.
Kiyoshi Satō (佐藤 清, Satō Kiyoshi)
Voiced by: Daiki Hamano
Kiyoshi Satō is the wisecracking goalkeeper of the team.
Miwa Takei (武井 美和, Takei Miwa)
Voiced by: Michiko Neya
Miwa Takei is the soccer club coach. She is good at judo but she chooses to join the soccer club because of her love for an anime with a soccer player as the main character. She is also a fan of yaoi.
Tsubasa Umeya (梅屋 翼, Umeya Tsubasa)
Voiced by: Daisuke Namikawa
Tsubasa Umeya is a judo club member who joined the soccer club after he fell in love with Moka Gotō. When he learned about her crush on Aoyama, Tsubasa decides to support Moka's love instead but he states that not every couple would end up marrying each other so he only needs to wait until his time comes.

==== Others ====
Atsumu Ozaki (尾崎 篤夢, Ozaki Atsumu)
Voiced by: Showtaro Morikubo
Atsumu Ozaki is a popular manga author under the pen name "Mirai Takada" known for his cool-handsome aura despite his secretive presence. He loves observing things around him for manga references but he later becomes annoyed with Aoyama's popularity. He decides to create an antagonist based on him but the character ends up gaining popularity for his manga instead.
Shion Narita (成田 紫苑, Narita Shion)
Voiced by: Hirofumi Nojima
Shion Narita is one of Aoyama's classmates and is also a clean freak like him but he hides it to avoid drawing attention. Shion likes to play online games, specifically "Beasts Hunter" because the online world is where he would not need to worry about getting dirty. He is playing at the same party as Aoyama in the game.
Mio Odagiri (小田切 美緒, Odagiri Mio)
Voiced by: Mai Nakahara
Mio Odagiri is the school's idol and a member of the basketball club. Despite her athletic ability, Mio is unable to shoot the ball until Aoyama inspires her to put some feeling into it. Mio is currently the only person who could touch Aoyama without him fainting. She is hinted to have developed a crush on him after her classmate pointed out their closeness.
Yuri Tamura (田村 百合, Tamura Yuri)
Voiced by: Rina Satou
Yuri Tamaru is Gaku Ishikawa's girlfriend and one of Aoyama's fans.

=== Oshigami-Minami High ===
Akira Takechi (武智 彰, Takechi Akira)
Voiced by: Takehito Koyasu
Oshigami-Minami High's forward who always insists on Aoyama joining their soccer club instead while looking down on the rest of Fujimi High's soccer club members. He always shows his abs when talking to Aoyama.
Seigo Ibuki (伊吹 誠吾, Ibuki Seigo)
Voiced by: Shinichiro Miki
One of the U16 players' along with Aoyama, whose football skills exceeds those of Aoyama's. He was contracted with a Spanish football club, but he came back to Japan because he missed Japanese food.
Kozue Kurata (倉田 梢, Kurata Kozue)
Voiced by: Aya Endō
Seigo's girlfriend whom he thought was bad at cooking, but in reality, she cooks healthy for Seigo's sake. Although it makes her food taste bland.

=== Takada High ===
Kana (カナ)
Voiced by: Manami Numakura
Kana is Yōji's girlfriend who was initially tasked to lock Aoyama up in their clubroom to ensure Takada High's win but ended up becoming his fan instead.
Yōji Orihara (折原 洋二, Orihara Yōji)
Voiced by: Tatsuhisa Suzuki
Takada High soccer club's captain with a Yankee hairstyle. It is said that soccer is the only thing he does seriously but, he likes to playing dirty to ensure his win.

== Media ==
=== Manga ===
Clean Freak! Aoyama kun is written and illustrated by Taku Sakamoto. It was first published in Shueisha's Miracle Jump on May 20, 2014. It was later transferred to Shueisha's Weekly Young Jump on January 29, 2015, and finished on January 4, 2018. Shueisha collected its 113 chapters into thirteen tankōbon volumes, released between June 19, 2015, and March 19, 2018.The series became digitally available in English on Shueisha's Manga Million platform in 2026, under the title Clean Freak! Aoyama.

==== Volumes ====
No.	Japanese release date	Japanese ISBN
1	June 19, 2015	978-4-08-890101-5
Chapter 1: "Aoyama-kun Is a Clean Freak"; Chapter 2: "Gotou-san Is Shy"; Chapter 3: "Zaizen-kun, Let's Work Hard Tomorrow, Too"; Chapter 4: "Aoyama-kun's Rumor Is Crazy"; Chapter 5: "Aoyama-kun's Reason For His Choice"
2	January 19, 2015	978-4-08-890153-4
Chapter 6–13
3	November 19, 2015	978-4-08-890308-8
Chapters 14–22
4	February 19, 2016	978-4-08-890360-6
Chapters 23–27; Chapter 28: "What Zaizen-kun Heard Was"; Chapters 29–31
5	June 17, 2016	978-4-08-890460-3
Chapters 32–40
6	October 19, 2016	978-4-08-890546-4
Chapters 41–49
7	February 17, 2017	978-4-08-890594-5
Chapters 50–58
8	June 19, 2017	978-4-08-890643-0
Chapters 59–67
9	June 19, 2017	978-4-08-890685-0
Chapters 68–76
10	July 19, 2017	978-4-08-890704-8
Chapters 77–85
11	November 17, 2017	978-4-08-890782-6
Chapters 86–94
12	March 19, 2018	978-4-08-890875-5
Chapters 95–103
13	March 19, 2018	978-4-08-890876-2
Chapters 104–111; Final Story; Chapter 113: "Aoyama-kun and Rainy Day"

=== Anime ===
An anime television series adaptation by Studio Hibari aired from July 2 to September 17, 2017. With Kazuya Ichikawa directing and Midori Gotou supervising scripts. TMS Entertainment are credited with producing the anime. The opening theme is "White" by Bentham, while Ryotaro Okiayu, Tomokazu Seki, Sōichirō Hoshi, Daisuke Sakaguchi, Hiroyuki Yoshino perform the ending theme "Taiyō ga Kureta Kisetsu" (The Season the Sun Gave Us) under the name "Fujimi High School Soccer Team." Crunchyroll streamed the anime.

==== Episodes ====
No.	Title	Original release date
1	"Aoyama-kun Is a Clean Freak!"; Transliteration: "Aoyama-kun wa Kireizuki" (Japanese: 青山くんはキレイ好き)	July 2, 2017
Aoyama is a talented midfielder of Fujimi High School's soccer team and has mysophobia. His obsession with cleanliness around him and during the game enrages his fellow teammate named Kaoru Zaizen. When Oshigami-Minami High School's soccer team visited his school and its forward named Akira Takechi persuaded him to join their school instead, Aoyama overcomes his phobia for a short time to win the match.
2	"Aoyama-kun, Do You Remember?"; Transliteration: "Aoyama-kun wa Oboeteru?" (Japanese: 青山くんは覚えてる？)	July 9, 2017
Moka Gotō has a crush on Aoyama since elementary and decides to secretly clean the soccer clubroom as a way to help him. She eventually becomes the club manager after she got caught by the team. The next day, a rumor about Aoyama's fragrant towel spreads around and causes chaos among people curious about its smell. Kaoru manages to dispel the crowd but he later gets to smell the towel until Aoyama catches him in the act.
3	"The Reason Aoyama-kun Isn't Here"; Transliteration: "Aoyama-kun ga Inai Riyū" (Japanese: 青山くんがいない理由)	July 16, 2017
Akira and Taichi Yoshioka engage in an eating contest at a family restaurant while Aoyama and his teammates wait for the rain to stop. On the day of the match against Takada Academy High School, its captain's girlfriend named Kana locks Aoyama inside their clubroom to prevent him from competing. Moka manages to find them and frees him to join the final few minutes of the match, leading to Fujimi's victory.
4	"Narita-kun Keeps It a Secret"; Transliteration: "Narita-kun wa Himitsu ni Shiteiru" (Japanese: 成田くんは秘密にしている)	July 23, 2017
Shion Narita has an obsession with cleanliness, like his classmate Aoyama, but he keeps it secret in their class. Shion and Aoyama compete in a cooking match during their home economics class. Shion is suspected to be the thief of one of his classmates' P.E. uniform until Aoyama solves the situation.
5	"Tsukamoto-kun's Life Is All About Laughs"; Transliteration: "Tsukamoto-kun wa Uke ga Inochi" (Japanese: 塚本くんはウケが命)	July 30, 2017
Fujimi's next match is against Minamida Fuzoku High School but Jin Tsukamoto faces trouble with their captain named Ryō Kadomatsu due to being bullied by him in their middle school days. Aoyama, Taichi, and Kazuma Sakai help him to regain his confidence to win the game.
6	"Ozaki-kun Has His Pride"; Transliteration: "Ozaki-kun ni wa Puraido ga Aru" (Japanese: 尾崎くんにはプライドがある)	August 6, 2017
Aoyama's popularity irritates a manga author named Atsumu Ozaki. He decides to create a villain based on Aoyama but the character becomes a fan favorite, much to his chagrin. Atsumi finds ways to make the villain unlovable.
7	"Odagiri-san Can't Get It In"; Transliteration: "Odagiri-san wa Nakanaka Hairanai" (Japanese: 小田切さんはなかなか入らない)	August 13, 2017
During a basketball match, Mio Odagiri manages to touch Aoyama without him fainting. After he challenged her for arm-wrestling and even requested her to make him a homemade lunch, everyone at school believe the two are in a relationship. Aoyama invites Mio to watch his soccer match for him to experience a high five. Mio clarifies they are not dating, much to everyone's relief while Moka realizes that Aoyama only wanted to feel how to be touched.
8	"Umeya-kun Is Very Patient"; Transliteration: "Umeya-kun wa Nintai Tsuyoi" (Japanese: 梅屋くんは忍耐強い)	August 20, 2017
Tsubasa Umeya quits the judo club and joins the soccer team to get closer to his crush (Moka). He invites Aoyama and Moka to visit a cat shop inside a zoo for a date. As Aoyama and Moka go on a boat together to conclude the day, Tsubasa believes that a couple would not always end up marrying and will wait for his time.
9	"Miwa-chan Wants to Do a Training Camp"; Transliteration: "Miwa-chan wa Gasshuku ga Shitai" (Japanese: 美和ちゃんは合宿がしたい)	August 27, 2017
Fujimi soccer club's coach named Miwa Takei invites the team to attend a training camp after she got inspired by an anime show she obsessed with. The team and other clubs arrive in a man-made indoor beach resort operated by Kaoru's rich family. Later night, they participate in a test of courage.
10	"Aoyama-kun Has Many Secrets"; Transliteration: "Aoyama-kun wa Himitsu ga Ōi" (Japanese: 青山くんは秘密が多い)	September 3, 2017
Kaoru, Kazuma, Jin, and Taichi follow Aoyama on his way home to learn about his lifestyle after a girl named Kozue Kurata visited him. They find him cooking dinner inside a house owned by Seigo Ibuki, a famous soccer player of the Spanish national team. Aoyama helps Seigo to make amends with his girlfriend (Kozue) after the latter got angry at him for messing with the nutritional dinner she cooked for him.
11	"Sakai-kun's Hairstyle Has Changed"; Transliteration: "Sakai-kun no Kamigata ga Kawatta" (Japanese: 坂井くんの髪型が変わった)	September 10, 2017
Kazuma changes his hairstyle to look like Aoyama, gaining popularity among female students and becoming better at playing soccer in the process. He replaces Kaoru as the new forward, causing the latter to ask Moka for help in training him. Meanwhile, Jin and Taichi persuade Kazuma to return to his old self and enjoy becoming friends with them instead of acting cool.
12	"The Reason Behind Aoyama-kun's Choice"; Transliteration: "Aoyama-kun no Eranda Riyū" (Japanese: 青山くんの選んだ理由)	September 17, 2017
Kaoru becomes worried that Aoyama might quit their soccer club after he spotted scouts talking to him about joining renowned teams instead of Fujimi's. During their preliminary match against Kuraishi High School, the team struggles to score until Kaoru manages to do so as a present for his mother who arrived to watch the game after she went overseas for five years. Aoyama then delivers the winning scores that led to Fujimi's victory. He later reveals his intention to remain in the team due to the color of their uniforms (white), which symbolized cleanliness.
