= The Last Uniform =

Japanese manga series

- The Last Uniform English volume 1 cover.

最後の制服 (Saigo no Seifuku)
- Genre: Romance, yuri
- Manga
- Written by: Mera Hakamada
- Published by: Houbunsha
- English publisher: NA: Seven Seas Entertainment
- Magazine: Manga Time Kirara Carat; Manga Time Kirara Max
- Original run: February 24, 2004 – September 24, 2006
- Volumes: 3

The Last Uniform (Japanese: 最後の制服, Hepburn: Saigo no Seifuku) is a Japanese manga series written and illustrated by Mera Hakamada. The series was first serialized in the Japanese seinen manga magazine Manga Time Kirara Carat on February 24, 2007, published by Houbunsha, but later had concurrent serialization in the magazine Manga Time Kirara Max between May 24, 2004, to August 29, 2005, published by the same company. The manga concluded on September 24, 2006, and three tankōbon volumes were published. The manga was licensed by Los Angeles–based company Seven Seas Entertainment. The first and second volumes were released on June 30, 2007, and October 31, 2007.

== Plot ==
The Last Uniform takes place at the Tsubakigaoka Girls' Dorm where each of the female students is paired with a roommate. Beniko Kazura is paired with Tsumugi Kase, and Ai Sawara is paired with Fuuko Yamada, though the roommates have crushes on each other which makes it impossible for them to stay merely friends.

== Characters ==
Beniko Kazura (葛良 紅子, Kazura Beniko)
Beniko is a second year student in high school residing in the Tsubakigaoka Girl's Dorm with Tsumugi Kase as her roommate, and is the dormitory leader. She is in the art club. Due to her beautiful appearance, calm temperament, good grades, and excellent reflexes, she has gained a small group of younger girls who follow her around as groupies. Beniko has a crush on Tsumugi.
Tsumugi Kase (加瀬 紡, Kase Tsumugi)
Tsumugi is a second year student in high school, and is Beniko's roommate, whom she has a crush on. She is in the archery club. She has a blunt personality and can get easily embarrassed.
Ai Sawara (佐原 藍, Sawara Ai)
Ai is a first year in high school living in the dormitory with Fuuko Yamada as her roommate, whom she has a crush on. In junior high school she wore thick glasses, but after entering high school she switched to wearing contact lenses.
Fuuko Yamada (山田 楓子, Yamada Fūko)
Fuuko, also referred to as "Fuu-chan", is a first year student in high school, and is Ai's roommate, whom she has a crush on. She is in the track and field club. She has a cheerful personality, but is seen as somewhat of a troublemaker.
Asagi Kisaragi (如月 あさぎ, Kisaragi Asagi)
Asagi is a third year in high school living in the dormitory. She has a cool personality, though is a little abnormal. When Beniko first entered school, Asagi was struck with love at first sight. Ever since, she has been trying to gain Beniko's feelings, but Beniko does not like Asagi.
Anzu Hiwatari (樋渡 杏, Hiwatari Anzu)
Anzu is a first year student in high school who moves into the dorm with Ai and Fuuko. She has a high degree of culinary skill, and often cooks delicious meals for dorm parties. Anzu once had strong feelings for Beniko and thus developed a jealous hatred of Tsumugi, but after Tsumugi rescued Anzu in an incident involving an underwear thief, Anzu's feelings of hatred toward her changed to love.
