= Anzu Haruno =

Japanese voice actress (born 1994)

- 春野 杏
- Born: October 30, 1994 (age 31); Kanagawa Prefecture, Japan
- Occupation: Voice actress
- Years active: 2015–present
- Agent: Arts Vision
- Height: 163 cm (5 ft 4 in)

Anzu Haruno (春野 杏, Haruno Anzu; born October 30, 1994) is a Japanese voice actress from Kanagawa Prefecture who is affiliated with Arts Vision. She debuted as a voice actress in 2015 and started to receive major roles in 2017.

== Biography ==
Born October 30, 1994, in Kanagawa Prefecture, Haruno graduated from the Japan Institute of Broadcasting and Acting. She joined the Yokohama branch of the Japan Oral Acting Institute in 2012 before making her voice acting debut in 2015.

Haruno took a brief hiatus in 2022 as she was hospitalized. On July 17, 2023, Haruno officially announced her marriage via her official Twitter account. In her announcement, she revealed that her husband is a salaryman who works outside of the entertainment industry.

== Filmography ==
Television anime
Year	Title	Role	References
2016	Cardfight!! Vanguard G: NEXT	Schoolgirl	
2016	Love Live! Sunshine!!	Schoolgirl	
2016	Momokuri	Schoolgirl	
2017	Blend S	Mafuyu Hoshikawa	
2017	Clean Freak! Aoyama-kun	Moka Gotō	
2017	Urara Meirocho	Undulette	
2018	After the Rain	Mii	
2018	Last Hope	Chun Wu	
2018	Yuuna and the Haunted Hot Springs	Koyuzu Shigaraki	
2019	Hensuki	Ayano Fujimoto	
2019	Fruits Basket	Mio Yamagishi	
2019	Star Twinkle PreCure	Anna Amamiya	
2019	That Time I Got Reincarnated as a Slime	Ramiris	
2020	Tamayomi	Sayumi Ōno	
2020	Sakura Wars the Animation	Child	
2020	Higurashi: When They Cry – Gou	Classmate	
2020	Kuma Kuma Kuma Bear	Ans	
2021	Farewell, My Dear Cramer	Noriko Okachimachi	
2022	The Executioner and Her Way of Life	Pandæmonium	
2024	Atri: My Dear Moments	Ririka Nanami	

Original video animation (OVA)
Year	Title	Role	References
2024	Code Geass: Rozé of the Recapture	Yūri Sano	

Video games
Year	Title	Role	References
2020	Atri: My Dear Moments	Ririka Nanami	
2021	Arknights	Kirara	
2022	Lackgirl I	Tsumugi	
2023	Fate/Grand Order	Wandjina	
