= Null Meta =

Japanese manga series

- First tankōbon volume cover

ぬるめた (Nurumeta)
- Genre: Comedy; Slice of life
- Manga
- Written by: Kokamumo
- Published by: Houbunsha
- Imprint: Manga Time KR Comics
- Magazine: Manga Time Kirara Max
- Original run: March 19, 2020 – present
- Volumes: 6
- Anime television series
- Directed by: Kai Ikarashi
- Written by: Tatsuya Takahashi
- Studio: Soigne
- Original run: 2027 – scheduled
- icon

Null Meta (Japanese: ぬるめた, Hepburn: Nurumeta) is a Japanese four-panel manga series written and illustrated by Kokamumo. It was originally posted as a web manga on their Pixiv account from April 2018, before beginning serialization in Houbunsha's Manga Time Kirara Max magazine in March 2020. The series has been compiled into six volumes as of January 2026. An anime television series adaptation produced by Soigne is set to premiere in 2027.

== Plot ==
Kurumi Uozumi, a high school student, is an android who goes to Rokkaku High School. Her friends include Chiaki Sōen, Kurumi's guardian and whose father created Kurumi, Chiaki's childhood friend Sakina Agoshi, and their classmate Shiyuki Takada. The four friends live out their high school lives while dealing with Kurumi's antics, such as giving her new features to make her more human.

== Characters ==
Kurumi Uozumi (魚住 くるみ, Uozumi Kurumi)
A second-year high school student and an advanced android being developed by Chiaki's father. Her official name is NULLOID:01 "KURUMI". Despite being an android, her advanced development makes her human-like. She currently lives with Chiaki.
Chiaki Sōen (宗円 千明, Sōen Chiaki)
Kurumi's classmate and guardian. Her father developed Kurumi. The two currently lived together as Chiaki is estranged from her father. She is skilled in technology, to the point she can develop new features for Kurumi.
Sakina Agoshi (鴉越 咲樹菜, Agoshi Sakina)
Chiaki's childhood friend, who lives next door. She has a lazy yet calm personality, and is a bookworm.
Shiyuki Takada (高田 詩雪, Takada Shiyuki)
The straight man of the group. She is usually just called "Yuki" by her friends.

== Media ==
=== Manga ===
The series is written and illustrated by Kokamumo. It was originally posted on their Tumblr account on April 3, 2018, before beginning serialization as a web manga on their Pixiv account on April 23 of the same year. The series was then released as a guest series in Houbunsha's Manga Time Kirara Max magazine between December 19, 2019, and February 19, 2020, before beginning regular serialization in the magazine on March 19, 2020. The first tankōbon volume was released on January 27, 2021; six volumes have been released as of January 27, 2026.

No.	Release date	ISBN
1	January 27, 2021	978-4-8322-7246-0
2	January 26, 2022	978-4-8322-7344-3
3	January 26, 2023	978-4-8322-7435-8
4	January 26, 2024	978-4-8322-9519-3
5	January 27, 2025	978-4-8322-9606-0
6	January 27, 2026	978-4-8322-9692-3

=== Anime ===
An anime television series adaptation was announced by Aniplex on October 18, 2026. The series will be produced by Soigne and directed by Kai Ikarashi, with Tatsuya Takahashi handling series composition and Shin Ogasawara designing the characters. It is set to premiere in 2027.

== Reception ==
The series was nominated twice for the eighth and the ninth Next Manga Awards in the print category.
