= Rakka Ryūsui =

Japanese manga series

落花流水
- Genre: Comedy, Yuri
- Manga
- Written by: Ikki Sanada
- Published by: Houbunsha
- Magazine: Manga Time Kirara Max
- Original run: 2006 – 2015 February
- Volumes: 9
- Light novel
- Written by: Hiro Akizuki
- Illustrated by: Ikki Sanada
- Published by: Houbunsha
- Published: July 27, 2007
- Other
- Drama CD Rakka Ryūsui; Rakka Ryūsui Variety CD

Rakka Ryūsui (落花流水 (らっかりゅうすい)) is a Japanese 4koma manga written and illustrated by Ikki Sanada. The series began its serialization in Manga Time Kirara Max in 2006. The main character is Akiho Hayama, and the story is about her comedic days at the kyūdō club at Sakuraba Girls' High School (桜庭女子高校, Sakurabajoshikōkō), an all-girls school. The series ended on February 19, 2015, with a final 9th volume release on the March 27, 2015.

== Plot ==
After learning that she had passed the entrance examinations to enter the Sakuraba Girl's High School, Hayama Akiho, while attempting to escape from club recruitment staff, experiences love at first sight when she meets the president of the kyūdō club, Hokaze Minatsu. Akiho joins the kyūdō club after her first meeting with Minatsu, becoming friends with her and other club members. The story progresses throughout the school year, showing characters move up a year and in later volumes introducing new characters.

== Characters ==
Akiho Hayama (葉山 秋穂, Hayama Akiho)
Voiced by: Mai Nakahara
Akiho, the protagonist, is a first year student (currently second year) at Sakuraba Girl's High School and a member of the kyūdō club. She sports a ponytail with her long, dark hair, which is tied with a red ribbon. She has a deep affection for the kyūdō club's President, Minatsu, and is often depicted as sprouting animal ears and tail when around her, and frequently nosebleeds, indicative of her perverted feelings toward Minatsu. Akiho possesses a decent level of skill in her archery, once being able to shoot four arrows such that they were connected by the shafts, She has since been promoted to shodan rank in kyūdō. Although her apartment does not allow pets, she secretly keeps a cat named Moka (もか Moka) found by Minatsu.
Minatsu Hokaze (帆風 水夏, Hokaze Minatsu)
Voiced by: Aya Endō
A second year student (currently third year) at Sakuraba Girl's High School, she is Akiho's senpai and President of the kyūdō club. She is widely popular amongst the girls in the school, to the extent that the riot police had to be called in during Valentine's Day. She is skilled at kyūdō, possessing the rank of yondan, and she once won the local competition with a perfect score. She also has an obsession over cute creatures (especially cats), to the extent of purchasing all reading material pertaining to cats as well as donning cat ears.
Haruka Kusaba (草葉 春河, Kusaba Haruka)
Voiced by: Yuki Matsuoka
A classmate of Akiho, she has med-length golden hair, and speaks using Kansai-ben. Her kyūdō abilities are odd and the results of her shots are unpredictable, she prefers moving targets. She performs poorly in academics, and resorts to giving gifts in hopes of appeasing her teachers.
Mafuyu Shimotsuki (霜月 真冬, Shimotsuki Mafuyu)
Voiced by: Tomoko Kaneda
A chemistry teacher at Sakuraba Girls' High School, and subsequently the homeroom teacher of Akiho, Haruka and Akatsuki's class in their second year. She is the advisor of the kyūdō club, but she is not that skilled at it. She is childishly innocent, but she speaks very politely. She has the appearance of a 7-year old grade schooler with brown hair, tied on the left side of her head. Though the reasons for this is unknown, she apparently has a license to cook fugu.
Yū Gojyō (五条 夕, Gojyō Yū)
Voiced by: Miyuki Sawashiro
Introduced in the second year of the story, she is a third year student that transferred into the high school, and is a soft-spoken individual. She sports long, blonde hair with a cowlick, with the hair by her ears reminiscent of animal ears. She possesses a weak body, and has a weak pulse.
Akatsuki Ayase (綾瀬 暁, Ayase Akatsuki)
Voiced by: Hitomi Nabatame
Introduced in the second year of the story, she is a second year student and the Archery Club's ace. She is a classmate of Akiho and Haruka. She has short dark blue hair, and wears short athletic tights under her school uniform. She is a childhood friend of Yū, and immediately rushes to Yū's side should something happen to her. One of her grievances is that she is completely flat-chested, and once attempted to increase her bust size along with Akiho following bad advice from Mafuyu.

== Media ==
=== Manga ===
Rakka Ryūsui is written and illustrated by Ikki Sanada, it is currently being serialized in the Japanese magazine Manga Time Kirara Max published by Houbunsha starting in 2006. Rakka Ryuusui is a 4-koma Yuri comedy, and is set in a kyūdō club in an all-girls high school. It was then green-lit into a full manga series by the author with its first chapter published in April 2006, compiling it into 9 volumes.

=== Novel ===
A Rakka Ryūsui light novel, written by Hiro Akizuki and illustrated by Ikki Sanada, was published by Houbunsha on July 27, 2007.

=== Drama CD ===
On March 25, 2009, a drama CD called Rakka Ryūsui drama CD was released in Japan. A Rakka Ryuusui Variety CD was released at Comiket 76 on August 14, 2009.
