= Manga Time Kirara Max =

Japanese manga magazine

Manga Time Kirara Max まんがタイムきららMAX
- Categories: Seinen manga
- Frequency: Monthly
- Circulation: 50,000 (2019)
- First issue: Special issue of Manga Time Kirara in March 2004; November 2004 (released in September 2004)
- Company: Houbunsha
- Country: Japan
- Language: Japanese
- Website: http://www.dokidokivisual.com/magazine/max/

Manga Time Kirara Max (まんがタイムきららMAX) is a Japanese four-panel seinen manga magazine published by Houbunsha. It is the third magazine of the "Kirara" series, after Manga Time Kirara and Manga Time Kirara Carat. The first issue was released in March 2003 as a special edition of Manga Time Kirara. The first independent issue was released on September 29th 2004. Currently the magazine is released on the 19th of each month.

== History ==
=== Supplement issue ===
- May 24, 2004 - Created as the supplement issue of "Manga Time Kirara" (Vol.1). Since it was a supplement issue, only one issue is published.

=== Monthly magazine ===
Until September 19, 2024, it was 20 years after first issue, and the latest issue number is No.241.

- September 29, 2004 - First issue is published as November issue, 2004. Starting from this issue, issue number is recorded as "Month" Issue and No.○, published on the 29th of each month.
- September 20, 2005 - Since November issue, 2005, it was changed to release on 19th of each month and the price is changed.
- July 19, 2006 - Since September issue, 2006, the serif of logo "MAX" was changed and the design is renewed.
- October 18, 2008 - December issue, 2008 was released, and it had an issue number No.50.
- September 19, 2009 - September issue, 2009 was released. It was 5th anniversary since it became an independent publication. A comic anthology of Kanamemo, which celebrates the 5th anniversary, was included.
- March 19, 2010 - May issue, 2010 was released. The issue number on the cover and side had a minor change.
- December 19, 2012 - February issue, 2013 was released. It was the 100th issue and it had an anniversary cover.
- June 19, 2013 - August issue, 2013 was released. It announced the held of "2013 Summer Reading Report Contest", which collects the article of readers based on manga serialized on this magazine. In the November issue, 2013, outstanding work was posted.
- August 19, 2014 - October issue, 2014 was released. It is a commemorative issue and a 10th anniversary booklet, "MAXX" was included.
- February 18, 2017 - April issue, 2017 was released and it is the No.150 issue.
- April 19, 2021 - June issue, 2021 was released. It is a commemorative issue and a 200th issue anniversary booklet, "MAX200" was included.

== Ongoing serialized manga ==
English title (Note: Most English titles are taken from the title graphic used when the series was serialized, or from the tankōbon cover; the cell is left blank where no English title is documented.)	Japanese title	Author	Guest appearance	Serialized since
Is the Order a Rabbit?	ご注文はうさぎですか？	Koi	December 2010 issue	March 2011 issue
Bocchi the Rock!	ぼっち・ざ・ろっく！	Aki Hamaji	February–April 2018 issue	May 2018 issue
Null Meta	ぬるめた	Kokamumo	February–April 2020 issue	May 2020 issue
	SAN値直葬！闇バイト	Mukurome	February–March 2022 issue	April 2022 issue
	エイティエイトを2でわって	Arima	February–April 2023 issue	May 2023 issue (Note: Guest chapters ran under the title ニブンノハチジュウハチ)
	アイドルビーバック！	Kaori Hanzawa	—	September 2023 issue (Note: Ends with the January 2027 issue.)
Miss Eguchi's Pure-hearted Succubus	江口さんちの純情サキュバス	Eru Kudō	June–August 2024 issue	September 2024 issue
Sailor Suit & Kansai Dialect	セーラー服と関西弁	Lime Man	September–November 2024 issue	December 2024 issue
I Want to Make Bodoge with You!	きみとボドゲが作りたい！	Natsuichi Akagi	January 2025 issue	May 2025 issue
Akari Yumeji and the Magical Book	夢路あかりと魔法の本	2222 Kusunoki	March–April 2025 issue	June 2025 issue
Child's Room Dragon	子供部屋ドラゴン	*sow*	April–June 2025 issue	July 2025 issue
	わたしにプールは狭すぎた！	Hibiki-san	May–June 2025 issue	August 2025 issue
Momo-iro Campanella	桃色カンパネラ	Rinrikoko	August–September 2025 issue	November 2025 issue
Game Center no Kokoro	ゲームセンターのこころ	Kenta Urosu	September–November 2025 issue	December 2025 issue
	マジック・パニック！	Tsusayama	October–November 2025 issue	February 2026 issue
	あくまじょグリモワール	Kasaboshi Satsuma	January–February 2026 issue	March 2026 issue
	はにーとらっぱー！	Maritani	April–May 2026 issue	July 2026 issue
Kawaii Destroys Everything	可愛いはすべてを破壊する	Utau Aizaki	May–July 2026 issue	September 2026 issue
Call Me Frankenstein	コール・ミー・フランケンシュタイン	Hamburger	July–August 2026 issue	October 2026 issue
	AMOR-恋するキューピッドアモル-	Sabi	August–October 2026 issue	November 2026 issue
Samurai Maid Kisser	侍メイドキッサー	Sakuma You	September–October 2026 issue	December 2026 issue

== Finished manga series ==
Title	Japanese title	Author	Guest appearance	Serialized since	End of serialization
	いんぷれ	Akazawa RED	Not Applicable	July issue, 2005	
	魔法のじゅもん	Araki Kanao	Not Applicable		
	てんしのたまご		Not Applicable		
	かたつむりちゃん		Not Applicable		
	帝立第13軍学校歩兵科異常アリ!?		Not Applicable		
	0からはじめましょう		Not Applicable		
	カラフル曜日		Not Applicable		
The Last Uniform	最後の制服		Not Applicable		
	兄妹はじめました！		Not Applicable		
	えむの王国		Not Applicable		
	ぴよぴよライフ		Not Applicable		
	ちびでびっ！		Not Applicable		
	ワンダフルデイズ		Not Applicable		
The Inhabitants of Somewhere (○ Hon no Jūnin)	○本の住人		Not Applicable		
	烈！きなこパーティー		Not Applicable		
Very Sweet	ベリースイート		Not Applicable		
	スズナリ！		Not Applicable		
	りんたま		Not Applicable		
	LR少女探偵団		Not Applicable		
	ももえん。		Not Applicable		
	にこプリトランス		Not Applicable		
	茶華道部へようこそ★		Not Applicable		
	きらきらきら		Not Applicable		
	Glee Green Island		Not Applicable		
	看板娘はさしおさえ		Not Applicable		
	Wハーフ		Not Applicable		
	ひより日和				
	落花流水				
	天然女子高物語				
	お仕えしたいの！				
	無敵せんせい				
	あきばちゃんねる				
	オオカミの手かします！				
Welcome to Wakaba-Soh	ようこそ。若葉荘へ				
	しらたま！				
	はなまるべんと！				
	ちかちかプラネッツ				
	ひろなex.				
	通りすがりのLibreria				
	イチロー！				
	ファンブルスター				
	ちかろぐ				
	ケノモノ学園				
	ぐーぱん！				
	がーるずぽっぷ				
	ピコピコぱんち！				
	スキっ！キライっ！				
	まん研				
	ぼくの生徒はヴァンパイア				
	ちびっと！				
	カンフーちゃー				
	深葉学園☆未来機械普通科				
	ももいろちゃいむ				
Kanamemo	かなめも				
Kotoha no Ōji-sama					
Free!					
Rakka Ryūsui					
Ichigo no Haitta Sodasui					
Doushite Watashi ga Bijutsuka ni!?					

== Anime adaptations ==
- Kanamemo - Summer 2009
- Kin-iro Mosaic - Summer 2013
- Is the Order a Rabbit? - Spring 2014
- Hello!! Kin-iro Mosaic - Spring 2015
- Is the Order a Rabbit?? - Fall 2015
- Magic of Stella - Fall 2016
- Comic Girls - Spring 2018
- Is the Order a Rabbit? BLOOM - Fall 2020
- Bocchi the Rock! - Fall 2022
- Null Meta - 2027
- Bocchi the Rock! 2 - TBA

== Game adaptations ==
- Miracle Girls Festival – December 17, 2015
- Is the Order a Rabbit?? Wonderful Party! - March 3, 2016
- Kin-iro Mosaic Memories - December 27, 2016
- Kirara Fantasia – December 11, 2017

== See also ==
- Manga Time Kirara
- Manga Time Kirara Carat
- Manga Time Kirara Forward
