= Is the Order a Rabbit? =

Japanese manga and anime series

- Cover of Is the Order a Rabbit? volume 1 by Hōbunsha featuring the characters Cocoa (center), Rize (left), Chino (right), and Tippy (center right)

ご注文はうさぎですか？ (Gochūmon wa usagi desu ka?)
- Genre: Comedy, slice of life
- Manga
- Written by: Koi
- Published by: Houbunsha
- English publisher: NA: Yen Press Sol Press (formerly)
- Magazine: Manga Time Kirara Max
- Original run: March 2011 – present
- Volumes: 14
- Anime television series

Is the Order a Rabbit? (Season 1) Is the Order a Rabbit?? (Season 2) Is the Order a Rabbit? BLOOM (Season 3)
- Directed by: Hiroyuki Hashimoto
- Produced by: Hiroyuki Kobayashi; Mitsutoshi Ogura; Gaku Iwasa (Season 1)
- Written by: Kazuyuki Fudeyasu
- Music by: Ruka Kawada
- Studio: White Fox (Season 1 and 2); Kinema Citrus (Season 2); Encourage Films (Season 3)
- Licensed by: NA: Sentai Filmworks; UK: MVM Entertainment; SA/SEA: Muse Communication
- Original network: Tokyo MX, SUN, KBS, TV Aichi, AT-X, BS11
- English network: US: Anime Network
- Original run: April 10, 2014 – December 26, 2020
- Episodes: 36
- Video game

Is the Order a Rabbit?? Wonderful Party!
- Developer: 5pb.
- Platform: PlayStation Vita
- Released: March 3, 2016
- Anime film

Is the Order a Rabbit?? 〜Dear My Sister〜
- Directed by: Hiroyuki Hashimoto
- Written by: Koi; Hiroyuki Hashimoto
- Music by: Ruka Kawada
- Studio: production doA
- Released: November 11, 2017
- Runtime: 60 minutes
- Original video animation

Is the Order a Rabbit?? ~Sing For You~
- Directed by: Hiroyuki Hashimoto
- Written by: Kazuyuki Fudeyasu
- Music by: Ruka Kawada
- Studio: production doA
- Released: September 26, 2019
- Runtime: 25 minutes
- Anime film

Is the Order a Rabbit? The Movie: We Are Family!
- Directed by: Hiroyuki Hashimoto (chief); Tensho
- Written by: Tensho
- Studio: Bibury Animation Studios
- icon

Is the Order a Rabbit? (Japanese: ご注文はうさぎですか?, Hepburn: Gochūmon wa Usagi desu ka?), often abbreviated as Gochiusa (ごちうさ), is a Japanese four-panel manga series written and illustrated by Koi. The series has been serialized in Houbunsha's Manga Time Kirara Max magazine since March 2011 and the chapters collected into fourteen tankōbon volumes as of September 2026. The manga was released in Indonesia by Elex Media Komputindo. An anime television series adaptation animated by White Fox aired in Japan between April and June 2014. A second season by White Fox and Kinema Citrus aired in Japan between October and December 2015. Two OVA films animated by production doA were released in November 2017 and September 2019. A third anime season by Encourage Films aired in Japan between October and December 2020. A new anime film produced by Bibury Animation Studios has been announced.

== Plot ==
In a small Continental European styled town in Japan, teenage Cocoa Hoto enters the cafe Rabbit House, assuming there are rabbits to be cuddled. What Cocoa actually finds is her high school boarding house, staffed by the owner's daughter, Chino Kafū, a small, precocious, and somewhat shy girl with an angora rabbit on top of her head. She quickly befriends Chino with the full intention of becoming like her older sister, much to Chino's annoyance. From there she experiences her new life and befriends many others, including the military-influenced, yet feminine Rize Tedeza, the playful Chiya Ujimatsu who goes at her own pace, and the impoverished Syaro Kirima who commands an air of nobility and admiration despite her background. Slowly, through slices of life, often comedic, Cocoa becomes irreplaceable in her new friends' lives, with Chino at the forefront.

== Characters ==
Most characters are named after drinks or food.

=== Main characters ===
Cocoa Hoto (保登 心愛, Hoto Kokoa; usually written as ココア)
Voiced by: Ayane Sakura
Cocoa is introduced as a 15-year-old girl with orange mid-length hair, purple eyes, and a cherry blossom hair accessory. She is a bubbly and optimistic girl who claims to be able to make friends in three seconds, although she is often careless and has no sense of direction. She moved to town to study at a high school and stays in the Kafū residence. She began helping out at the Rabbit House to pay for her accommodation. Although she cannot distinguish the taste of coffee, she is able to work as a waitress. Cocoa is the youngest of four siblings and admires her older sister Mocha, who gave her a hair accessory (in which she has the other half). She treats Chino like a little sister so that Chino has an older sister figure to look up to, just as Cocoa does with Mocha. Due to all the people she has met in her life, Cocoa dreams of becoming an international barista lawyer with her own bakery. She even wants to be a part-time novelist (not to mention her younger self wanted to be a magician). Her name is a reference to hot chocolate (ホットココア, hotto kokoa).
Chino Kafu (香風 智乃, Kafū Chino; usually written as チノ)
Voiced by: Inori Minase
Chino is introduced as a 13-year-old girl with long and straight blue hair, blue eyes, and two hair accessories on two sides in the shape of a cross. She is the granddaughter of the Rabbit House's founder. She is a quiet and soft-spoken girl and slowly warms up to Cocoa. She finds it challenging to be less polite and more casual due to her growing up with mostly older people. Along with her father, she is one of the only people who knows about the secret concerning Tippy and her grandfather. Her late mother created the Rabbit House's outfits because she one day wanted Chino to work there with her friends when she grew up. Cocoa coming into her life had a significant impact on her, leading to her adopting a more outgoing demeanor. Her name is a reference to the coffee drink cappuccino (カプチーノ, kapuchīno).
Rize Tedeza (天々座 理世, Tedeza Rize; usually written as リゼ)
Voiced by: Risa Taneda
Rize is introduced as a 16-year-old girl with purple hair that she often makes into bunches. A part-timer at the Rabbit House, she is the daughter of a wealthy former soldier, and thus likes army-related things and has a very disciplined, military-like personality, even going so far as to carry a model Glock and a combat knife. Despite this, she is still very kind and feminine. She excels in both academics and sport that she can provide help to different clubs. She is in the same school as Syaro and is her upperclassman. Her name is a pun on "Thé des Alizés," (テデザリゼ, tedezarize), a French tea that blends Chinese green tea with hints of peach, kiwi, and watermelon.
Chiya Ujimatsu (宇治松 千夜, Ujimatsu Chiya; usually written as 千夜)
Voiced by: Satomi Satō
Chiya is introduced as Cocoa's classmate at Cocoa's new high school. She is 15 years old, like Cocoa, and the two instantly become close friends. Later, she is also revealed to be Syaro's childhood friend. Her family runs a coffee shop named Ama Usa An (甘兎庵), complete with a rabbit mascot named Anko. Her grandmother was once the main business rival of Chino's grandfather, but both granddaughters do not intend to continue that rivalry. She is rather playful at times, often in a nonchalant manner. She is physically weak, and any tedious physical activity tires her out. She is very good at dodging things, however. She hopes to work with Syaro despite being hurt when Syaro once said she didn't intend to work in Ama Usa An. Her name is a reference to the symbolic Japanese green tea Uji matcha (宇治抹茶, Uji matcha).
Syaro Kirima (桐間 紗路, Kirima Sharo; usually written as シャロ)
Voiced by: Maaya Uchida
Syaro is introduced as a 15-year-old girl who attends the same school as Rize. She is a scholarship student but is poor. Syaro learned to be elegant due to her status as a scholarship student despite coming from a poor background. She learned to fit in by staying up to date on fashion and faking smiles. She greatly admires Rize as a person and her upperclassman and has a crush on her. She is also Chiya's childhood friend, and they live next door to each other. She has a wild grey rabbit named "Wild Geese" (ワイルドギース, Wairudo Gīsu). Syaro reluctantly allowed the rabbit to stay in her house under the condition that it finds its own food. She is very hardworking and performs well in academics as she wants to get out of poverty. Her name is a reference to Kilimanjaro coffee (キリマンジャロ, kirimanjaro).
Maya Joga (条河 麻耶, Jōga Maya; usually written as マヤ)
Voiced by: Sora Tokui
Maya is introduced as Chino's classmate and friend in middle school. She's very energetic and tomboyish, claiming she will only stay put when she is dead. Maya also harbors admiration for Rize, partly due to her military-like attitude. Despite her behavior and attitude, she does surprisingly well academically. Her name is a reference to Jogmaya pearls (ジョガマヤ, jogamaya) tea.
Megumi Natsu (奈津 恵, Natsu Megumi; usually written as メグ)
Voiced by: Rie Murakawa
Megumi is introduced as Chino's classmate and friend in middle school. Her friends call her "Megu" (メグ, Megu) for short. Her mother is a ballet teacher, so Megu is trained in ballet. Mature, honest, feminine, and trusting, she is rather pure and unable to detect when someone lies to her. She can guess what Maya is thinking by looking into her eyes. Her name is a reference to nutmeg (ナツメグ, natsumegu) tea.

=== Rabbit House ===
Cocoa Hoto
Chino Kafu
Rize Tedeza
Tippy (ティッピー, Tippī)
Voiced by: Motomu Kiyokawa
A female angora rabbit and the Rabbit House's mascot. She typically sits atop Chino's head while inside the Rabbit House. When not around Cocoa and the others, she speaks in a manly voice and helps Chino's father out at the bar. It is later revealed that through some unknown circumstances (though it is implied Cocoa was somehow involved), Tippy is possessed by the spirit of Chino's grandfather, the former owner of Rabbit House. Tippy would often speak in front of others, with Chino passing the voice off as her ventriloquism. Named after tippy golden flowery orange pekoe (ティッピー・ゴールデンフラワリー・オレンジペコ, tippī gōruden furawarī orenji peko) tea.
Takahiro Kafu (香風 タカヒロ, Kafū Takahiro)
Voiced by: Show Hayami
Chino's father, who runs the bar during the night alongside Tippy. He is a friend of Rize's father, as the two of them were former soldiers. He allows Cocoa to stay in his house, as well as Mocha, during their employment at Rabbit House. He is the current owner of Rabbit House, which he runs more successfully than Chino's grandfather, to Tippy's irritation.
Saki Kafu (香風 咲, Kafū Saki; usually written as サキ)
Voiced by: Nana Mizuki
Chino's late mother and Takahiro's late wife. She had long and straight silver hair and blue eyes, was a friend of Cocoa's mother during high school, and the creator of the Rabbit House's uniform. Named after cup rabbit (カップうさぎ, kappu usagi).
Midori Aoyama

=== Ama Usa An ===
Chiya Ujimatsu
Chiya's Grandma (千夜の祖母, Chiya no Sobo)
Voiced by: Miyuki Ichijo
Owner of Ama Usa An; she used to have a hostile relationship with Chino's grandpa and, despite their alleged rivalry, she did not take him seriously.

=== Fleur de Lapin ===
Syaro Kirima

=== Bright Bunny ===
Natsume Jinja (神沙 夏明, Jinja Natsume; usually written as ナツメ)
Voiced by: Atsumi Tanezaki
One of the twins that Megu and Maya encountered in the train. Megu's classmate and friend in high school. Named after ginger (ジンジャー, jinjā) tea and jujube (ナツメ, natsume) tea.
Eru Jinja (神沙 映月, Jinja Eru; usually written as エル)
Voiced by: Reina Ueda
Long blonde hair with red eyes. One of the twins that Megu and Maya encountered in the train. Maya's classmate and friend in high school. Named after ginger ale (ジンジャーエール, jinjāēru).
Fuyu Fuiba (風衣葉 冬優, Fuiba Fuyu; usually written as フユ)
Voiced by: Manaka Iwami
A girl with short hair and dark blue eyes who is good at both ventriloquism and chess. Chino's classmate and friend in high school. Named after feverfew (フィーバーフュー, fībāfyū).

=== Other town residents ===
Midori Aoyama (青山 翠, Aoyama Midori)
Voiced by: Saori Hayami
A female novelist who goes under the pen name of Aoyama Blue Mountain (青山 ブルーマウンテン, Aoyama Burū Maunten). She admired Chino's grandfather (who she affectionately calls "Master" (マスター, Masutā)) and always asked his opinion about her stories. She briefly stopped writing books after she lost a pen that was given to her by Chino's grandfather. Chino gave her a temporary job in the Rabbit House, which she would still occasionally work at after finding her pen. She is a high school graduate of Rize and Syaro's private school. Named after Blue mountain coffee (ブルーマウンテン, Burū maunten).
Rin Mate (真手 凛, Mate Rin)
Voiced by: Juri Kimura
Midori's friend and editor. She is a high school graduate of Rize and Syaro. Named after Mandheling coffee (マンデリン, manderin).
Rize's father (リゼの父, Rize no chichi)
Voiced by: Hiroki Tōchi
Rize's father. Takahiro's old friend and comrade from their years in the military. He has an eyepatch over his left eye, possibly due to a war injury.
Megu's mother (メグの母, Megu no haha)
Voiced by: Kikuko Inoue
A ballet teacher who owns/runs a dancing school and discovered the potential of Rize and Syaro and attempted to convince them to be her students. Like Midori, she is a graduate of the same school that Rize and Syaro attend and wants her own daughter to attend the same school.

=== Classmates ===
==== Rize and Syaro's high school ====
Yura Karede (狩手 結良, Karede Yura; usually written as ユラ)
Voiced by: Saori Ōnishi
Rize's classmate and old friend and former chairmen of the Blowgun Club who is studying at the same university as Rize, whom she previously worked for as a maid. Named after calendula (カレンデュラ, Karendyura) tea.

==== Cocoa and Chiya's high school ====
Class president / Mai (委員長 / マイ, Iinchō / Mai)
Voiced by: Yoko Hikasa
Cocoa and Chiya's class president in the second year. Chiya's classmate in the third year.
Rei (レイ)
Voiced by: Masumi Tazawa
Cocoa and Chiya's classmate in the second year. Cocoa's classmate in the third year.
Kano (カノ)
Voiced by: Tomomi Mineuchi
Cocoa and Chiya's classmate in the second year. Cocoa's classmate in the third year.
Anzu (杏; usually written as あんず)
Voiced by: Yūki Kuwahara
Cocoa and Chiya's classmate in the second year. Chiya's classmate in the third year. Named after ansu apricot (アンズ, anzu).
Natchan (なっちゃん)
Voiced by: Yuka Nukui
Cocoa and Chiya's classmate in the second year. Chiya's classmate in the third year. Named after Natchan! (なっちゃん, natchan).
Miki (ミキ)
Voiced by: Ayasa Itō
Cocoa and Chiya's classmate in the second year.
Karin (カリン)
Voiced by: Nao Shiraki
Cocoa and Chiya's classmate in the second year. Named after chinese quince (カリン, Karin).

=== Hot Bakery ===
Cocoa Hoto
Mocha Hoto (保登 モカ, Hoto Moka)
Voiced by: Ai Kayano
Cocoa's older sister. She is very similar to Cocoa, besides the fact that Mocha is known for being a far more dependable older sister, and for being very good at cuddling people. She dotes on Cocoa and become depressed if Cocoa ignores her. Named after caffè mocha (カフェモカ, kafe moka).
Chiyoko Hoto (保登 ちよこ, Hoto Chiyoko)
Voiced by: Yūko Minaguchi
Cocoa's mother. High school classmate of Chino's mother (revealed on the final episode of Is the Order a Rabbit? BLOOM). Named after hot chocolate (ホットチョコ, hotto choko).

=== City Residents ===
Cocoa's father (ココアの父, Cocoa no chichi)
Works in the city as a professor at a university.
Kei Hoto (保登 ケイ, Hoto Kei) and Itsuki Hoto (保登イツキ, Hoto Itsuki)
Voiced by: Kaoru Takasugi and Sora Tokui
Cocoa's elder brothers and Mocha's younger brothers. They are working in the city to be a lawyer and scientist, respectively. Named after hot-cake (ホットケーキ, hotto kēki).
Chidori Ujimatsu (宇治松 千鳥, Ujimatsu Chidori)
Chiya's mother who travels around as a buyer. Named after plover (チドリ, chidori).
Syaro's mother (シャロの母, Sharo no haha)
She runs a pottery workshop with her husband.

== Books and publications ==
=== Manga ===
No.	Original release date	Original ISBN	English release date	English ISBN
1	February 27, 2012	978-4-8322-4119-0	December 16, 2020 (SP, digital); October 15, 2024 (YP)	979-8-8554-0584-2
2	February 27, 2013	978-4-8322-4269-2	February 18, 2025	979-8-8554-0586-6
3	March 27, 2014	978-4-8322-4420-7	June 24, 2025	979-8-8554-0588-0
4	September 26, 2015	978-4-8322-4617-1	November 25, 2025	979-8-8554-0590-3
5	August 27, 2016	978-4-8322-4734-5	June 2, 2026	979-8-8554-0592-7
6	November 9, 2017	978-4-8322-4894-6	November 24, 2026	979-8-8554-0594-1
7	November 7, 2018	978-4-8322-4990-5	April 27, 2027	979-8-8554-0596-5
8	September 27, 2019	978-4-8322-7119-7	—	—
9	December 25, 2020	978-4-8322-7237-8	—	—
10	December 25, 2021	978-4-8322-7333-7	—	—
11	February 22, 2023	978-4-8322-7438-9	—	—
12	March 27, 2024	978-4-8322-9533-9	—	—
13	August 27, 2025	978-4-8322-9655-8	—	—
14	September 26, 2026	978-4-8322-9752-4	—	—

=== Complete Blend manga ===
No.	Release date	ISBN
1	August 26, 2021	978-4-8322-7302-3
2	September 27, 2021	978-4-8322-7307-8
3	September 27, 2022	978-4-8322-7399-3
4	October 27, 2023	978-4-8322-7495-2

=== Art books ===
No.	Title	Release date	ISBN
1	Café du Lapin	May 27, 2014	978-4-8322-4448-1
2	Café du Soleil	October 27, 2020	978-4-8322-7225-5
3	Café de Étoile	November 26, 2020	978-4-8322-7232-3

=== TV anime official guide books ===
No.	Title	Release date	ISBN
1	Memorial Blend	September 27, 2014	978-4-8322-4486-3
2	Miracle Blend	March 26, 2016	978-4-8322-4683-6

=== Comics anthology ===
Title	Release date	ISBN
Is the Order a Rabbit? Anthology Comic 1 (ご注文はうさぎですか？ アンソロジーコミック 1)	April 26, 2014	978-4-8322-4436-8
Is the Order a Rabbit? Anthology Comic 2 (ご注文はうさぎですか？ アンソロジーコミック 2)	September 26, 2015	978-4-8322-4618-8
Is the Order a Rabbit? Chimame-tai Anthology 〜Happy Diary!〜 (ご注文はうさぎですか？ チマメ隊 アンソロジー 〜Happy Diary!〜)	November 25, 2016	978-4-8322-4768-0
Is the Order a Rabbit? Rabbit House Anthology ~coffee break~ (ご注文はうさぎですか？ ラビットハウスアンソロジー 〜coffee break〜)	November 9, 2017	978-4-8322-4895-3

== Anime television series ==
An anime television series adaptation animated by White Fox aired in Japan between April 10 and June 26, 2014, and simulcast by Crunchyroll. The opening theme is "Daydream Café." by Petit Rabbit's (Ayane Sakura, Inori Minase, Risa Taneda, Satomi Satō, and Maaya Uchida), and the ending theme is "Poppin' Jump♪" (ぽっぴんジャンプ♪, Poppin Janpu) by Chimame-tai (Minase, Sora Tokui, and Rie Murakawa). The ending theme for episode 12 is "Nichijou Decoration" (日常デコレーション, Nichijō Dekorēshon; lit. 'Everyday Decoration') by Petit Rabbit's. Sentai Filmworks licensed the series for the North America market, while Muse Communication licensed the series for Southeast Asia and South Asia market.

A second season titled Is the Order a Rabbit?? animated by White Fox and Kinema Citrus was announced in the March 2015 issue of Gakken's Megami Magazine, and aired in Japan between October 10 and December 26, 2015. The opening theme is "No Poi!" (ノーポイッ！, Nōpoi!) by Petit Rabbit's and the ending theme for episode 1 to 10 is "Tokimeki Poporon♪" (ときめきポポロン♪) by Chimame-tai. For episode 12, the ending theme is Nantonaku Mirai (なんとなくミライ) by Petit Rabbit's.

An OVA film, Is the Order a Rabbit?? ~Dear My Sister~, was announced in May 2016, and animated by production doA. The film was screened in 40 movie theaters across Japan on November 11, 2017, and later released on home video on May 30, 2018.

A second OVA, Is the Order a Rabbit?? ~Sing For You~, was released on September 26, 2019. The OVA features the return of scriptwriter Kazuyuki Fudeyasu, director Hiroyuki Hashimoto, and animation studio production doA.

A third season titled Is the Order a Rabbit? BLOOM animated by Encourage Films aired in Japan between October 10 and December 26, 2020, with the cast and staff reprising their roles. The opening theme is "Tenkū Cafeteria" (天空カフェテリア) by Petit Rabbit's while the ending theme is "Nakayoshi! Maru! Nakayoshi!" (なかよし！○！なかよし！) by Chimame-tai. For episode 12, the ending theme is "Yume<Utsutsu→Happy time"(ユメ＜ウツツ→ハッピータイム) by Petit Rabbit's. The third season ran for 12 episodes.

A new anime project was announced during the "Is the Order a Rabbit? Rabbit House Talk Party 2025" event on March 1, 2025. It was later revealed to be a film titled Is the Order a Rabbit? The Movie: We Are Family!, produced by Bibury Animation Studios and written and directed by Tensho, with Hiroyuki Hashimoto returning as chief director, Munenori Nawa serving as assistant director, and Akane Yano designing the characters.

After the acquisition of Crunchyroll by Sony Pictures Television, the parent company of Funimation in 2021, Is the Order a Rabbit?, among several Sentai titles, was dropped from the Crunchyroll streaming service on March 31, 2022.

== Appearances in other media ==
Characters and songs from Is the Order a Rabbit? appear alongside other anime characters in the rhythm game, Miracle Girls Festival, developed by Sega for the PlayStation Vita on December 17, 2015. A visual novel developed by 5pb., titled Is the Order a Rabbit?? Wonderful party! (ご注文はうさぎですか？？ Wonderful party!), was released for the PlayStation Vita in Japan on March 3, 2016. Characters from Is the Order a Rabbit? appeared in collaboration with Ameba's mobile game Girl Friend Beta in 2017. Characters in the series also appeared in the mobile game Kirara Fantasia in 2018.
