= Madoka Asahina =

Japanese voice actress (born 1993)

- 朝日奈 丸佳
- Born: December 17, 1993 (age 32); Shizuoka Prefecture, Japan
- Occupation: Voice actress
- Years active: 2015–present
- Agent: 81 Produce

Madoka Asahina (朝日奈 丸佳, Asahina Madoka; born December 17, 1993) is a Japanese voice actress from Shizuoka Prefecture who is affiliated with 81 Produce. She is known for her roles as Shūka Hanazono in Idol Time PriPara.

== Filmography ==
=== TV anime ===
Year	Title	Role	Notes	Source
2015	Tantei Team KZ Jiken Note	Nako Tachibana	ep. 3; also voiced a girl (eps. 1–2) and "Female Student A" (eps. 5–6)	
2016	Reikenzan: Hoshikuzu-tachi no Utage	Candidate	ep. 1	
2016	Nurse Witch Komugi R	Maki		
2016	Space Patrol Luluco	Alien student	eps. 1–2	
2016	Age 12: A Little Heart-Pounding (season 1)	Gal clerk	ep. 5; also voiced a schoolgirl (eps. 1, 3, 8)	
2016	Pan de Peace!	Mai Kawai	eps. 8–13	
2016	Love Live! Sunshine!! (season 1)	Maid, Mother	also voiced a female college student (ep. 4), a schoolgirl (eps. 1–3, 6), and a student (ep. 5)	
2016	New Game!	Nene Sakura		
2016	Age 12: A Little Heart-Pounding (season 2)	Mikami	eps. 1–2, 4; also voiced a staff (ep. 9)	
2016	Pokémon the Series: Sun & Moon	Wrap	eps. 1, 11, 24–25, 27	
2017	Little Witch Academia	Avery	eps. 1, 12, 25	
2017	Yowamushi Pedal: New Generation	Spectator	ep. 3	
2017	BanG Dream! (season 1)	Fumika Mori	also voiced Kinako Mitarai (ep. 11)	
2017	Idol Time PriPara	Shūka Hanazono		
2017	Hina Logi ~from Luck & Logic~	Liones Yelistratova	eps. 1–3	
2017	New Game!!	Nene Sakura		
2018	Mitsuboshi Colors	Tadokoro	eps. 4, 12	
2018	Teasing Master Takagi-san (season 1)	Sumire Takagawa	eps. 5, 10–12	
2019	Kaguya-sama: Love Is War (season 1)	Karen Kino	eps. 1–2	
2019	We Never Learn (season 1)	Asumi Kominami	eps. 10–11, 13	
2019	Teasing Master Takagi-san (season 2)	Sumire Takagawa		
2019	We Never Learn (season 2)	Asumi Kominami		
2019	Azur Lane	Yuugure	ep. 9; also voiced Hatakaze (ep. 11)	
2020	Seton Academy: Join the Pack!	Pan Saruhara	eps. 5, 12	
2020	Kaguya-sama: Love Is War (season 2)	Karen Kino	eps. 4–5, 10–12	
2020	The Misfit of Demon King Academy	Jessica Arnet	also voiced a girl in black uniform (ep. 2)	
2020	Mewkledreamy	Futami Kusama	eps. 23–24	
2021	Suppose a Kid from the Last Dungeon Boonies Moved to a Starter Town	Selen Hemein		
2022	In the Heart of Kunoichi Tsubaki	Uikyō		
2023	TenPuru	Mia Christoph		
2023	The Devil Is a Part-Timer!!	Acieth Alla		
2024	Plus-Sized Elf	Raika		
2024	PuniRunes Puni 2	Tomorun		
2024	Goodbye, Dragon Life	Mar		
2024	Murder Mystery of the Dead	Rumina		

=== Original video animation (OVA) ===
List of voice performances in OVA
Year	Title	Role	Notes	Source
2019	We Never Learn: The Predecessor [X] with Elegance with the Missing Item on the Beach	Asumi Kominami		
2020	We Never Learn: Church Bells Blessing [X]	Asumi Kominami		

=== Anime films ===
List of voice performances in anime films
Year	Title	Role	Notes	Source
2022	Joshi Kōsei to Mahō no Note	Yuzuki Shito		

=== Video games ===
List of voice performances in video games
Year	Title	Role	Platform	Source
2017	New Game!: The Challenge Stage	Nene Sakura	PlayStation 4, PlayStation Vita	
2017	Magia Record: Puella Magi Madoka Magica Side Story	Hinano Miyako	Microsoft Windows, Android, iOS	
2017	Azur Lane	Yuugure	Android, iOS	
2017	Azur Lane	Kamikaze	Android, iOS	
2018	Azur Lane	Matsukaze	Android, iOS	
2018	Azur Lane	Hatakaze	Android, iOS	
2018	ONGEKI	Riku Yūki	Arcade	
2019	Girls' Frontline	R5 Remington Gas Piston	Android, iOS	
2020	A Certain Magical Index: Imaginary Fest	Niang-Niang	Android, iOS	
2020	Death end re;Quest 2	Rotten Dollhart	PlayStation 4, Microsoft Windows, Switch	
2020	Girls' Frontline	Winchester Liberator	Android, iOS	
2020	Fate/Grand Order	Vritra	Arcade, Android, iOS	
2021	Gate of Nightmares	Mikan	Android, iOS	
2021	Touhou LostWord	Merlin Prismriver	Android, iOS	
2023	TEVI	CC, Ribbon, River Blue	PC, Switch, PS4, PS5, Xbox	
