= List of New Game! episodes =

New Game! is an anime television series based on the manga series created by Shōtarō Tokunō and published in Houbunsha's Manga Time Kirara Carat magazine. The series follows Aoba Suzukaze, a high school graduate who begins working at the Eagle Jump video game company as a character designer alongside her female colleagues. The anime is produced by Doga Kobo, with Yoshiyuki Fujiwara as the director and Fumihiko Shimo as the series' script supervisor, featuring character designs by Ai Kikuchi. The first season aired in Japan between July 4 and September 19, 2016, and was simulcast by Crunchyroll. An original video animation (OVA) episode was available for those who purchased all six Blu-Ray/DVD volumes of the series, released between September 28, 2016, and February 24, 2017. The opening and ending themes respectively are "Sakura Skip" (SAKURAスキップ, Sakura Sukippu) and "Now Loading!!!!", both performed by Fourfolium (Yūki Takada, Megumi Yamaguchi, Ayumi Takeo, and Megumi Toda). A second season titled New Game!! was announced in February 2017, and aired between July 11 and September 26, 2017. The second season's opening theme is "Step by Step Up ↑↑↑↑" while the ending themes are "Jumpin' Jump Up!!!!" for the first six episodes and "Yumeiro Compass" (ユメイロコンパス, Dream-colored Compass) for episode seven onwards, all performed by Fourfolium. The series is licensed in North America by Funimation, who are releasing English dubs of both seasons.

== Episode list ==
=== New Game! (2016) ===
No.	Title (Note: All English episode titles are taken from Crunchyroll.)	Original release date
1	"It Actually Feels Like I Started My Job"; Transliteration: "Nandaka Honto ni Nyūshashita Kibun desu!" (Japanese: なんだかホントに入社した気分です！)	July 4, 2016
High school graduate Aoba Suzukaze is hired as a character designer at the Eagle Jump video game company. As she adjusts to her new job, she is introduced to art director Rin Toyama, lead character designer Ko Yagami, game director Shizuku Hazuki and character designer Hifumi Takimoto. After Aoba struggles in her studies about 3D modeling, she receives help from Hifumi, shown to be shy in person but friendly through instant messaging. Later, Aoba is invited to eat lunch with monster designer Yun Iijima and animator Hajime Shinoda. After lunchtime, Ko takes a photo of Aoba in order to prepare her ID card. During a break, Aoba, Hifumi, Hajime and Yun have afternoon tea. After her first day at work, Aoba learns that the staff members are working on the third installment of Fairies Story, the video game franchise that inspired her to become a character designer. Aoba later talks on the phone with her high school friend Nene Sakura, explaining that she gets to work with Ko.
2	"So This Is an Adult Drinking Party..."; Transliteration: "Kore ga Otona no Nomikai..." (Japanese: これが大人の飲み会......)	July 11, 2016
It has been a week since Aoba started working at Eagle Jump. During a break, Aoba is shown photos of Hifumi with her pet hedgehog Sojiro, in which one of the photos displays Hifumi expressing a cute smile. Aoba encourages Hifumi to smile more naturally in person. The next day, Ko assigns Aoba with her first project, creating a model of a non-player character for a virtual village. Later, Aoba is invited by her coworkers to a welcome party at a restaurant. Shizuku leaves early after pointing out to Aoba that her coworkers are eccentric but still good. Ko asks Aoba if she has a boyfriend, while Rin asks Aoba if she knows how to pour beer in a glass. Hifumi requests Aoba to order her a neat mori takezo, which tempts Aoba to try a sip despite being two years younger than the legal drinking age. While Hifumi, Hajime and Yun head home, Ko takes Aoba and Rin to a bar, but Aoba is not allowed to drink an orange blossom cocktail. Aoba later talks on the phone with Nene, explaining that she is creating a villager model for the new game.
3	"What Happens If I'm Late to Work?"; Transliteration: "Chikoku Shitara Dō Narun Darō" (Japanese: 遅刻したらどうなるんだろう)	July 18, 2016
Aoba oversleeps and runs late for work alongside Yun. As they run from the train station on the way to Eagle Jump, Aoba ends up falling on her face after eventually running slower than Yun, while Hifumi is there nearby and helps pick up dropped items. Preparing to scold Aoba, Hifumi and Yun for running late, Ko lets them off the hook after hearing the full story. Aoba works long hours in order to get her villager model up to standard. After each retake, Ko informs Aoba that the villager model is rather stiff. Hifumi advises Aoba to build on the cuteness of the model. On the way home by train, Rin says that Ko does not settle for good enough and has high hopes for Aoba. Outside her home, Aoba is contacted by Nene, who expresses the importance of non-player characters. Having an epiphany, Aoba comes to work early next morning and finishes her villager model after spending a week on her first project. Ko finally approves the villager model, telling Aoba that her next project will have a deadline of three days.
4	"The First... Paycheck..."; Transliteration: "Hajimete no... Okyūryō..." (Japanese: 初めての...お給料...)	July 25, 2016
Aoba walks with Shizuku to the train station, as Aoba explains that she is currently working on her third villager model. Meanwhile, Rin misses the last train, having to stay overnight with Ko at the office. Ko and Rin wonder if their video game will sell well, and they discuss what Aoba has done so far as a character designer. The next morning, Rin tries out Ko's liberating style of fashion, but Aoba comes to work early. Later on, Rin gives Hifumi, Yun, Hajime and Aoba their paychecks. Rin asks Aoba how she is going to spend her first paycheck. Aoba learns that Hajime purchased figurines and Yun expanded her wardrobe with their first paychecks. Although Shizuku forgets how she spent her first paycheck, video game programmer Umiko Ahagon brings Shizuku back to her workspace. It is revealed that Rin went on a trip to the hot springs with Ko, while Hifumi bought a cosplay costume. After giving it much thought, Aoba decides to buy a cake for her parents as gratitude for buying her a suit. Ko and Rin later go to a spa, but Ko pokes fun at Rin's arm fat.
5	"That's How Many Nights We Have to Stay Over?"; Transliteration: "Sonna ni Tomarikomun desu ka?" (Japanese: そんなに泊まり込むんですか？)	August 1, 2016
Aoba takes a peek at the animated villager model that Hajime has worked on. After Rin's stylus stops working, Ko sends Aoba and Hajime on an errand to buy a new stylus at a consumer electronics store. When Hajime misplaces her wallet, Aoba luckily finds it next to Hajime's keyboard. They return to the office and give the new stylus to Ko, but Hajime is unable to pull off a cute look. The next day, Aoba learns that Hajime commutes by bike instead of by train. Hajime and Ko secretly adjust the thermostat up and down a few times, while Yun is self-conscious about losing weight due to her chubby arms hidden inside her long sleeves. As this erupts into a quarrel, Rin forbids Ko, Hajime and Yun from adjusting the thermostat. The following day, Aoba learns from Hifumi that Ko was timid two years ago. Aoba also learns from Rin that Ko was never great with other people. Later on, Aoba cheers for Ko despite the latter being a night owl and getting more work done after hours. Hifumi later begs Sojiro to tell her whether she should appear serious or childish.
6	"Like... The Release is Canceled?"; Transliteration: "Hatsubai...Chūshi to ka?" (Japanese: 発売...中止とか?)	August 8, 2016
After Aoba completes her quota of villager models, Ko tasks Aoba with designing an important villager model from scratch. Ko reveals that she became the lead character designer at Aoba's age. Aoba eventually realizes that the important villager model, which she names Sophia, is actually based on herself. The next day, as the coworkers enjoy their weekend off, Aoba meets Nene at the movie theater, where they buy popcorn and soda before watching the Moon Ranger movie with a magical girl genre. The following day, Ko and Rin have a meeting, while Aoba, Hifumi, Hajime and Yun discuss that the game release might get canceled. When Ko and Rin return from the meeting, Aoba, Hifumi, Hajime and Yun learn that they will have to work overtime since they are running behind schedule. Deciding to stay overnight with Ko at the office, Aoba ends up sleeping inside a meeting room in a bear-themed sleeping bag. Aoba learns that Hajime and Yun also saw the Moon Ranger movie.
7	"Please Train the New Hires Properly"; Transliteration: "Shinjin no Kyōiku wa Shikkarishite Kudasai" (Japanese: 新人の教育はしっかりしてください)	August 15, 2016
Umiko informs Aoba about the various import errors springing up from her villager models. Afterwards, Umiko makes up for her callousness by inviting Aoba to a shooting range for airsoft guns, though Ko tags along. Umiko shows Aoba how to hit a target, then Umiko and Ko end up in a duel. Later on, Aoba, Hifumi, Hajime and Yun go to the hospital for a company checkup. They get their blood pressure checked and their blood drawn by a young nurse named Yamada, though Umiko checks her own blood pressure and draws her own blood when Yamada becomes too neurotic. Also, they all get their measurements taken, where Yun discovers that Hajime has a toned abdomen. After the company checkup, Rin and Shizuku leave early to make preparations, while Ko tells Aoba that Eagle Jump will be hiring part-time playtesters. Aoba and Nene later talk on the phone, as Nene explains that summer break is soon approaching.
8	"It's Summer Break!!"; Transliteration: "Natsuyasumi daaa!!" (Japanese: 夏休みだああ!!)	August 22, 2016
With her college on summer break, Nene decides to become a part-time playtester at Eagle Jump under Umiko's supervision. During her first day on the job, Nene tries to surprise Aoba, but Umiko scolds Nene for supposedly snooping around. Nene works long hours each day reporting issues in gameplay. During a break, Nene inadvertently eats Ko's pudding from the fridge. Nene becomes very anxious when Rin sends a company email about the alleged theft. The next day, Nene anonymously replaces the pudding for Ko, who willingly gives it to Rin. After secretly sensing that Nene was responsible, Rin resolves the situation without directly ratting her out. Nene tells Aoba that she is happy to work at a company full of good coworkers. In an elevator, Umiko surprisingly praises Nene for her hard work.
9	"Do We Have To Come Into Work?"; Transliteration: "Shukkinshicha Ikenain desu ka?" (Japanese: 出勤しちゃいけないんですか？)	August 29, 2016
When Rin comes down with a cold, Ko decides to take her home and look after her. Aoba, Hifumi, Hajime and Yun are left to work without supervision, but Umiko catches them slacking off. Umiko learns that Nene is often concerned about Aoba since she is a klutz sometimes. Ko reluctantly feeds Rin some porridge. Later on, Umiko informs Aoba that the company will be closed during the weekend due to a power line checkup. Because of this, Aoba, Hifumi, Hajime and Yun decide to stay overnight in order to work on some touch-ups. Ironically, Umiko also learns that Aoba is often concerned about Nene since she is a klutz sometimes as well. After working long hours, Aoba, Hifumi, Hajime and Yun pay a visit to a local bathhouse in the middle of the night for some rest and relaxation. After telling Aoba and Nene that both Ko and Rin are on bed rest, Shizuku allows Nene to give Umiko a pastry, but this results in Nene having to move her workspace next to Umiko.
10	"Full-time Employment Is a Loophole in the Law to Make Wages Lower..."; Transliteration: "Seishain tte Okyūryō o Yasukusuru Tame no Hō no Nukeana..." (Japanese: 正社員ってお給料を安くするための法の抜け穴...)	September 5, 2016
After buying two boxes of donuts at half price, Aoba and Ko arrive at the office and realize that Hifumi also bought two boxes of donuts. Aoba and Hifumi bring one box of donuts to Umiko, who expresses that Nene has great work ethic despite her unruly behavior. Hajime and Yun bring two boxes of donuts, while Rin and Shizuku bring four boxes of donuts. Yun becomes worried when Shizuku also brings a pack of rice crackers. The next day, as Aoba and Nene commute to work by train together, Nene shows concern about Aoba overworking herself, but Aoba points out that Nene has neglected her college homework over summer break just for employment. Umiko later suggests that Nene should reconcile with Aoba as soon as possible. Aoba eats lunch with Ko, who says that she lives in a different world than her worried mother. Nene soon learns from Yun that Aoba has made fifty non-player characters by herself. After Aoba returns from an errand, Nene finally reconciles with Aoba. Hifumi hopes that Aoba will always be a kind person, while Rin overhears Ko receiving a phone call from her worried mother.
11	"There Were Leaked Pictures of the Game on the Internet Yesterday!"; Transliteration: "Rīku Gazō ga Kinō, Netto ni Detemashita yo!" (Japanese: リーク画像が昨日, ネットに出てましたよ!)	September 12, 2016
Ko sends Aoba, Hajime and Yun to a video game exhibit where Fairies Story 3 will be publicly announced, despite there being an internet leak. Hifumi is already there sporting a cosplay costume and playing the game demo. Upon seeing their work being praised, Aoba, Hajime and Yun become determined to excel at their work. The next day, Ko chooses Aoba's concept art of Sophia to be printed in a video game magazine. Ko reluctantly wears a nice outfit picked by Rin for an interview with Yamada, who is now a photographer. Later on, Nene reports a freeze in gameplay so close to the deadline. Umiko sends Nene on an errand to take Aoba with her and buy an energy drink from the grocery store. With all the coworkers staying up overnight, the new game is more or less complete. Nene has a tearful farewell with everyone else as her part-time job comes to an end.
12	"One of My Dreams Came True!"; Transliteration: "Hitotsu Yume ga Kanaimashita!" (Japanese: 一つ夢が叶いました!)	September 19, 2016
The coworkers meet together in order to buy their own limited edition copies of Fairies Story 3 going on sale. When Hajime and Nene inadvertently discuss some spoilers in public, it is soon discovered that the plot was only leaked on social media by players who bought advance copies. At a celebration party held for all the coworkers and sponsors, Ko and Shizuku each give a speech on their success. Aoba learns that Shizuku will be promoting Ko as the art director for the next project, while Rin and Shizuku will be game codirectors. After winning an airsoft gun from Umiko in a raffle, Nene sadly finds out that Umiko will be hiring professional playtesters for the next project. Shizuku tells Aoba that Ko was the art director for Fairies Story 2, but a new hire quit after six months due to her strict demeanor, leading Ko to step down as the art director. When Aoba finds Ko in the lobby, Aoba asks Ko to sign her copy of Fairies Story 3. Aoba expresses her gratitude for everything that Ko has done, assuring that Ko will make a great art director.
OVA	"My First Time on a Company Vacation..."; Transliteration: "Watashi, Shain Ryokō tte Hajimete nanode..." (Japanese: 私、社員旅行って初めてなので...)	March 31, 2017
The coworkers go on a company winter vacation to a ski resort, where Aoba confides in Ko that she is worried about her inability to ski. The next day, the coworkers eat breakfast, but Ko comes down with a fever, prompting Rin to look after her. Aoba eventually manages to overcome her fear when she goes skiing with Hifumi, Hajime and Yun. At night in the sauna, Hajime wonders why Yun covers her face with a towel, while Hifumi becomes concerned when Aoba brings a miniature snowman inside. The following day, Aoba and Hifumi hang out in the hot spring. Aoba plays with her snowman while Hifumi drinks sake. Ko, Rin and Umiko go to the bar. However, Rin becomes concerned when Ko and Umiko get drunk from shōchū. At night, Aoba enjoys the company winter vacation, hoping to return after finishing the next project.

=== New Game!! (2017) ===
No.	Title	Original release date
1	"Of All The Embarrassing Things To Be Caught Doing..."; Transliteration: "Hazukashī Tokoro o Mirarete Shimaimashita..." (Japanese: 恥ずかしいところを見られてしまいました……)	June 29, 2017 (pre-air); July 11, 2017
It has been a year since Aoba Suzukaze started her job at Eagle Jump. After learning from Rin Toyama that there will not be any new hires, Aoba informs Hifumi Takimoto, Hajime Shinoda and Yun Iijima about the disappointing and embarrassing news. Shizuku Hazuki encourages the others to propose a concept for a new video game. At a diner, Umiko Ahagon gives Nene Sakura some advice on her own video game programming skills, though Nene asks Umiko to keep this a secret from Aoba. The next day, Rin and Shizuku hold interviews in the meeting room, asking for feedback from Aoba, Ko, Hifumi, Umiko, Hajime and Yun regarding their interests and goals. During a cherry blossom viewing party at night, Shizuku announces that there will be a character design competition for the next project. After Rin says that this is the same competition in which Ko landed her role as the lead character designer for Fairies Story, this inspires Aoba to participate.
2	"This Is Just Turning Into Cos-purr-lay!"; Transliteration: "Kore Jā Tada no Kosupure da Nyā!" (Japanese: これじゃあただのコスプレだにゃー！)	July 18, 2017
The design document implements Hajime's idea of absorbing enemy abilities in a dungeon-themed action game. While Aoba is eager to participate in the character design competition, Yun believes that Ko is destined to win. Aoba takes a glimpse of Ko's unfinished character designs, leading Aoba to feel inadequate compared to Ko. The next day, when a tired Hajime shows up to work, Aoba, Ko, Hifumi and Yun assume that Hajime is overworking herself from her first design job. In actuality, Hajime stayed up late overnight binge-watching her favorite anime series called Dandy Max Returns. On the day of the character design competition, Shizuku surprisingly rejects Ko's finished character designs because they are too similar to Fairies Story. Instead, Shizuku approves Aoba's character designs based on her bear-themed sleeping bag, asking her to polish up her character designs for next week. When Aoba comes to Ko for advice, Ko lashes out at Aoba in frustration. Despite Aoba's regret and Ko's remorse, Ko eventually helps Aoba polish up her character designs. In turn, Shizuku appoints both Aoba and Ko to finalize the art designs for the next project.
3	"Ooh, I'm So Embarrassed!"; Transliteration: "...Ū, Hazukashī!" (Japanese: ……うー、恥ずかしい！)	July 25, 2017
Aoba and Ko begin overseeing the art designs for the new game called Peco. However, Aoba feels downhearted because she is unable to provide any input concerning the fur effect of the test model. Worried about Aoba, Hifumi invites her to lunch in order to snap her out of her funk. The next day, Umiko works on Peco and Nene works on her own video game Nene Quest, as they each manage to utilize their video game programming skills to create an enemy's fire-breathing attack. The following day, Umiko tells Shizuku to show remorse like Ko does. During a lunch break, Hifumi shares her bento with the other coworkers. Later on, Umiko meets up with Nene at her college, where Nene asks for feedback on Nene Quest, though Nene is embarrassed when Umiko points out the lag considering the simple graphics. At night, Nene learns that Aoba is the character designer for the protagonist of Peco, though Aoba is unaware that Nene is working on Nene Quest.
4	"How Dense... Can You Be?"; Transliteration: "Kono... Nibuchin-me!" (Japanese: この…にぶちんめ！)	August 1, 2017
Hajime misses out on snagging tickets for the Moon Ranger concert. Fortunately, she manages to attend the afternoon show after being invited by Yun to accompany her younger twin siblings Ren Iijima and Miu Iijima. Aoba and Nene come across Hifumi at the evening show. The next day, Ko and Hifumi have an awkward silence before Hifumi admits that she saw Ko smiling instead of being stone-faced. When Rin arrives, Hifumi becomes anxious over Ko being completely dense when Rin subtly expresses jealousy. The following day, the first playable version of the video game, which is about a girl who disguises herself inside a bear plushie and explores a wonderland in order to uncover its secrets, is soon approaching its deadline. Shizuku offers Hifumi to be the new lead character designer. Hifumi accepts this role after Ko reassures Hifumi that she will be fine. Some days later, the first playable version of the video game is approved by video game producer Christina Wako Yamato.
5	"Hey! Don't Touch Me There!"; Transliteration: "Ya, Hen na Toko Sawaranaide yo!" (Japanese: や、変なとこ触らないでよ！)	August 8, 2017
As Hifumi begins her duties as the new lead character designer, Yun fibs about being able to make her deadline. After being unable to make her deadline due to family obligations, Yun soon comes clean to Hifumi, who then helps Yun improve her workflow. Shizuku advises Hajime to seek help from Aoba and Yun regarding new mechanics for underwater gameplay. The next day, Aoba struggles to come up with a character design for the antagonist, a final boss in the form of a sickly and grumpy queen. After receiving pointers from both Ko and Rin, Aoba asks Shizuku for help on creating a touching backstory for the antagonist. Some days later, Ko approves Aoba's character design of the antagonist. Afterwards, Aoba and Nene have fun at an onsen with their high school friend Hotaru Hoshikawa. Aoba tells Hotaru about her future goals in life, while Nene shares ice cream bars that she bought from the convenience store.
6	"Wow... It's So Amazing..."; Transliteration: "Aa... Sugoi naa..." (Japanese: あぁ……すごいなあ……)	August 15, 2017
Ko pressures Aoba into making the key visual for Peco. Upon finally finishing Nene Quest, Nene invites Aoba and Hotaru to play the video game together. Nene finds it amazing when Aoba and Hotaru enjoy the gameplay. During a meeting, Christina shockingly informs that Ko will be making the key visual instead of Aoba, while Peco will be promoted as the latest title of the Fairies Story franchise. As Ko's retaliation falls on deaf ears, Shizuku accepts Aoba's requests to hold a key visual competition on the same day as the deadline for the alpha release. Aoba spends the next four days pushing herself to the limit in preparation for the key visual competition. However, Aoba is met with an overwhelming sense of defeat when she views Ko's finished key visual. As Ko's key visual is ultimately chosen to be published, Aoba accepts the outcome and looks forward for her next opportunity.
7	"I'm Sensing a Very Intense Gaze"; Transliteration: "Sugoku Atsui Shisen o Kanjiru" (Japanese: 凄く熱い視線を感じる)	August 22, 2017
In the interview room, Umiko brings Aoba to surprisingly interview Nene as a new applicant. Nene calmly explains that her experience as a part-time playtester influenced her to learn video game programming on the side. Impressed that Nene kept her composure in front of Aoba, Umiko hires Nene as a part-time video game programmer. At night in a bar, Shizuku consoles Christina, who expresses worry about the incident involving the key visual competition. The next day, Shizuku gives Christina a lucky charm, which secretly contains catnip. This causes Shizuku's office cat Mozuku to latch onto Christina, forcing her to break the ice with Aoba while Hifumi, Hajime and Yun listen. The following day, Hifumi willingly volunteers to move her workspace next to Ko. Soon after, Aoba and Ko meet graphic artist Momiji Mochizuki and video game programmer Tsubame Narumi, who are the two newly recruited interns at Eagle Jump. Learning that Aoba is the character designer for the protagonist of Peco while Ko is the art director doing the key visuals, Momiji gazes at Aoba while discreetly viewing her as a potential rival.
8	"I'm Telling You, I Want a Maid Café"; Transliteration: "Meido Kissa ga Ii to Ittanda yo" (Japanese: メイド喫茶がいいと言ったんだよ)	August 29, 2017
Aoba, Hajime and Yun struggle with planning the welcome party for the interns. Shizuku suggests for Aoba, Hajime and Yun to spontaneously cosplay as maid café waitresses, while Momiji decides to join in as well. However, Umiko puts an end to Shizuku's shenanigans. Ko blindly picks Aoba's choice of a steakhouse as the venue for the welcome party. During the welcome party, Nene and Tsubame get to know each other, while Momiji tries to loosen up around Aoba, Hifumi, Hajime and Yun. The next day at the cafeteria, Aoba tells Ko, Hajime, Yun and Shizuku that Momiji appears to be rather standoffish. Meanwhile, Hifumi talks with Momiji in the office, where Hifumi shows Momiji some photos of Sojiro as a way to open up more. The following day before lunchtime, Aoba, Hajime and Yun learn that Momiji and Tsubame live together as roommates. Afterwards, Momiji begins to express envy towards Aoba for being a character designer.
9	"At Least Put a Shirt On!"; Transliteration: "Shatsu Kurai Kina yo!" (Japanese: シャツくらい着なよ！)	September 5, 2017
After attending a performance of an Insect Five hero show, Hajime comes across high school friend Akki. Hajime lies about being a designer, but is surprised to know that Akki is a public servant. After hearing that Hajime used to hide the fact that she was an otaku during high school, Yun reveals that she used to be an otaku during high school as well. At least they both changed their fashion sense after graduating high school. The next day, Umiko tasks Nene and Tsubame with working on some minigames. Nene learns that Tsubame pursued video game programming in order to create a video game with Momiji. Upon hearing that Nene took up video game programming on a whim, Tsubame suddenly scorns Nene for using her connection with Umiko in order to be hired. Taking this criticism to heart, Nene strives to become an exemplary video game programmer. After Momiji and Tsubame eat dinner at their apartment, they find themselves in a panic when a cockroach scuttles inside as an uninvited guest. The following day, Tsubame stays on bed rest after catching a cold, while Momiji is unaware of her bedhead when she arrives at work.
10	"It's Gonna Really Break the Immersion"; Transliteration: "Dondon Riariti ga Usuku Natte Ikunda yo" (Japanese: どんどんリアリティが薄くなっていくんだよ)	September 12, 2017
Tsubame finishes her work on a Red Light, Green Light minigame, following the specifications given by Hajime. When Hajime asks for feedback from Yun, Aoba, Tsubame and even Momiji, this leads Hajime to make several revisions to the specifications. Some days later, Hajime takes the blame for causing delay after Tsubame voices concern over her internship. After Umiko tells Tsubame that Hajime is also having a tough time, Tsubame manages to complete a satisfactory revision to the specifications, though Shizuku has more ideas to add in. Meanwhile, Nene finishes her work on a ball-in-a-maze puzzle minigame, but Tsubame criticizes how incomplete it looks. A few days later, Umiko evaluates Nene's minigame. Although the easy mode works fine, the hard mode crashes immediately. Despite this, Umiko commends Nene for completing her task, encouraging Nene to refine her minigame in her spare time before breaking the news that she will be reassigned as a playtester for the remainder of her contract period. In the evening, Ko and Rin stay in the office, having a conversation about all the changes that they have been though. Showing gratitude for everything that Rin has done, Ko gives her a watch as a present.
11	"I Shudder to Imagine What's Hidden in Your Heart"; Transliteration: "Kokoro ni Nanika Kakaeteru no Ka" (Japanese: 心になにか抱えてるのか)	September 19, 2017
Nene runs into Ko and Momiji in the cafeteria during lunchtime. Momiji reveals that Tsubame went against the wishes of her parents, who will force her to take over managing their family-owned inn if she fails to get hired by Eagle Jump. Nene then reveals that Hotaru motivated Aoba to first apply for a job. During an emergency meeting, Umiko tells Nene that Tsubame prioritized quantity over quality in her assigned tasks. Just as Tsubame shudders in fear of ruining her chances of being hired, Nene decides to help Tsubame with debugging all the errors, reconciling with each other in the process. With all the bugs successfully fixed before the deadline, Umiko guarantees Tsubame's employment and renews Nene's contract. Eavesdropping on Ko and Christina, Rin shockingly learns that Ko will be leaving Eagle Jump. Ko and Umiko later eat at a ramen shop, where Yamada works as a waitress. Afterwards, Ko encourages Aoba and Momiji to participate in playing a game demo of Peco, giving them the opportunity to witness the outcome of their hard work.
12	"Make Sure You Buy It!"; Transliteration: "Zehi Katte Kudasai ne!" (Japanese: ぜひ買ってくださいね！)	September 26, 2017
During the promotional event for Peco, Rin learns that Ko will be working at the Blue Rose video game company in France for a few years, while Hifumi tells Momiji that Ko was chosen over Aoba for the key visual. During a panel discussion, Ko invites Aoba up on stage to publicly credit her as the character designer for the protagonist of Peco. Afterwards, Ko informs the other coworkers about her shocking plans to leave Eagle Jump. Ko is later invited by her coworkers to a farewell party at a restaurant, and Ko urges Rin to watch over her from afar when the latter gets emotional. On the day of Ko's flight, Momiji encourages Aoba to see Ko off at the airport. As Aoba vents her frustrations, Ko reveals that she was inspired to improve on herself after seeing when Aoba worked so hard for the key visual competition. Ko sets off for France after the other coworkers arrive to see her off. Rin makes sure to mention that Momiji actually passed her internship alongside Tsubame. A week later, Peco gets great reception when it goes on sale, which motivates Aoba to work hard on her next game.
