= Sakura Trick =

Japanese manga series and its adaptations

- First tankōbon volume cover, featuring Yuu (center left) and Haruka (center right)

桜Trick (Sakura Torikku)
- Genre: Romantic comedy; Slice of life; Yuri
- Manga
- Written by: Tachi
- Published by: Houbunsha
- Magazine: Manga Time Kirara Miracle!
- Original run: March 17, 2011 – August 16, 2017
- Volumes: 8
- Anime television series
- Directed by: Kenichi Ishikura
- Produced by: Hiroyuki Kobayashi; Junichirō Tanaka; Nobumitsu Urasaki; Masashi Takatori; Eriko Aoki
- Written by: Kenichi Ishikura
- Music by: Ryosuke Nakanishi
- Studio: Studio Deen
- Licensed by: AUS: Hanabee; NA: Sentai Filmworks; UK: MVM Films
- Original network: TBS, MBS, CBC, TBS Channel 1, BS-TBS
- Original run: January 9, 2014 – March 27, 2014
- Episodes: 12
- icon

Sakura Trick (Japanese: 桜Trick, Hepburn: Sakura Torikku) is a Japanese yuri manga series written and illustrated by Tachi. The four-panel manga was serialized in Houbunsha's seinen manga magazine Manga Time Kirara Miracle! from March 2011 to August 2017, with its chapters collected in eight tankōbon volumes. The series follows Haruka Takayama and Yū Sonoda, two girls who decide to make their relationship special by kissing each other in secret.

A 12-episode anime television series adaptation directed by Kenichi Ishikura and produced by Studio Deen aired between January and March 2014. For the adaptation, Ishikura focused on depicting the kissing scenes with particular detail, as well as keeping tight pacing in line with the original four-panel manga. He also evaluated the voice actors' performances and ability to portray character pairings, and had the opening and ending theme songs feature character imagery based on the lyrics.

Critics generally praised the anime adaptation's characters and production value. The show's representation of lesbian relationships, visual portrayal of its characters, and overall story received more mixed reviews.

== Synopsis ==
Haruka Takayama and Yū Sonoda were inseparable during middle school, but upon entering high school, they end up being seated on opposite sides of the classroom. Having to spend less time together, the two decide to make their relationship special by kissing each other in secret. As they become closer, they have to hide their intimacy from their friends while also working through their feelings for one another.

== Characters ==
Haruka Takayama (高山 春香, Takayama Haruka)
Voiced by: Haruka Tomatsu
Yū's best friend since junior high school. She often unknowingly pushes Yū to her demands, particularly for physical affection, until Yū begins to do so on her own later on. Haruka harbors romantic feelings for Yū and often fantasizes about her or gets jealous of others for being with her. She becomes the student council vice president during her third year. She and Yū become an official couple at the end of the story.
Yū Sonoda (園田 優, Sonoda Yū)
Voiced by: Yuka Iguchi
Haruka's best friend since junior high school. She is initially more reluctant in her displays of physical affection than Haruka, but still gives in to her requests. To comfort Haruka's growing insecurity about their friendship, Yū decides that she and Haruka will make their relationship special by kissing each other, which gradually grows into romantic feelings. She and Haruka become an official couple at the end of the story.
Kotone Noda (野田 コトネ, Noda Kotone)
Voiced by: Yūka Aisaka
Haruka and Yū's classmate. She is a bright and energetic girl. She comes from a rich family and many students believe she has an arranged fiancé. In reality, she lives with Shizuku and is in a relationship with her.
Shizuku Minami (南 しずく, Minami Shizuku)
Voiced by: Hiromi Igarashi
Haruka and Yū's classmate. She has a generally sour look, so her classmates tend to be surprised when she makes happy or angry expressions. She shares a romantic relationship with Kotone.
Kaede Ikeno (池野 楓, Ikeno Kaede)
Voiced by: Mai Fuchigami
Haruka and Yū's classmate and their class representative. She likes to tease others, and is particularly perceptive when it comes to what Haruka and Yū are up to. She went to middle school with Yuzu and Kotone and has a brother and sister. She becomes the student council president during her third year. Later on in the story, she develops romantic feelings for Yuzu and confesses to her, who accepts Kaede's confession. After the two become a couple, Kaede sticks closer to Yuzu and often teases her about their relationship when the other girls are around, much to Yuzu's embarrassment.
Yuzu Iizuka (飯塚 ゆず, Iizuka Yuzu)
Voiced by: Megumi Toda
Haruka and Yū's classmate. She has been friends with Kaede since elementary school, and is usually oblivious to the hidden relationships around her. She has two locks of hair reminiscent of the stem leaves of a yuzu fruit. She is tomboyish and athletic, and is known for her dancing ability. Yuzu accepts Kaede's feelings for her, and gets easily embarrassed when Kaede teases her about their relationship in front of others.
Mitsuki Sonoda (園田 美月, Sonoda Mitsuki)
Voiced by: Saki Fujita
Yū's older sister and the school's student council president. She is suspicious of Haruka and Yū 's relationship and often concocts plans with Kaede and Yuzu to catch them in the act. She develops a crush on Haruka and has frequent fantasies about them being intimate.
Sumi Otokawa (乙川 澄, Otokawa Sumi)
Voiced by: Momo Asakura
A second year student who succeeds Mitsuki as student council president after she graduates. She often speaks in a particular manner, ending her sentences with "no ja". Her friends call her "Sumisumi". She asks Haruka if she can be called her "little sister".
Rina Sakai (坂井 理奈, Sakai Rina)
Voiced by: Yurika Endō
The student council vice president and Mitsuki's classmate. She is in love with Mitsuki even after knowing of Mitsuki's crush on Haruka.

== Production ==
=== Anime ===
==== Adaptation ====
Kenichi Ishikura, the director of the anime adaptation, joined the project after being approached by Studio Deen producer Nobumitsu Urasaki. Ishikura felt that the manga's level of intimacy with its kissing scenes was unique for its time, and believed that omitting them would diminish the meaning of the work. Tachi, the manga's author, requested that at least one such scene be shown per episode.

==== Development ====
After closely studying the original series, Ishikura decided to write the screenplay along with directing it. His scripts included extensive stage directions, which he noted was typical when adapting four-panel manga. He instructed episode writers to maintain tight pacing in order to prevent declines in visual quality caused by extended runtimes. Ishikura stated that four-panel manga expresses stories succinctly, and that the anime's tempo needed to reflect this.

Ishikura described the original series as containing deep emotional themes, which he attributed to its female author. To convey these themes, he avoided overly harsh emotional portrayals and instead emphasized underlying kindness in the characters. He considered the series to be oriented towards a more female audience, which led to a focus on exploring romantic feelings rather than depicting a straightforward relationship.

Ishikura stated that the characters were one of the most important aspects of the anime, with the changes in their relationships driving the plot forward. He aimed to depict all the characters in endearing ways to appeal to their fans from the original manga.

==== Animation ====
According to Ishikura, kissing scenes posed a particular challenge for the anime. The studio devoted significant resources into animating the scenes, such as by including more detailed movements and a higher number of frames than regular scenes. Despite their frequent occurrence, he ensured that no frames were reused, citing the scenes' importance to the story.

Ishikura had previously worked at the animation studio Shaft, and many of his stylistic techniques, such as those involving background art, use of color, and scene layouts, came from his time there; in particular, his direction of Hidamari Sketch, another four-panel manga adaptation, influenced his approach to pacing and animation in Sakura Trick. In contrast to Hidamari Sketch, he sought to portray the series' characters in a gentler and softer manner, with the girls being much closer together.

The anime made use of chibi characters, a visual element not present in the manga. The original manga often included facial expressions inside speech balloons as reaction beats, so Ishikura used chibi expressions to achieve the same effect. In general, Ishikura chose to use symbols and other shorthand in the anime's visuals to avoid overly slow animation.

==== Voice acting ====
During auditions, Ishikura evaluated both the actors' performances and how well they portrayed character pairings. He also asked the actors to perform kissing scenes to ensure realistic portrayals. He cast Haruka Tomatsu as Haruka Takayama because of his opinion of her wide emotional range.

==== Soundtrack ====
Much of the imagery used in the opening and ending theme songs was derived from the songs' lyrics. For example, the opening theme, whose initial lyrics roughly translate to "kiss kiss kiss", begins with a kissing scene. In addition, the vocals transition from individual character duets to all six singing together, which Ishikura depicted through a group dance sequence.

== Media ==
=== Manga ===
Written and illustrated by Tachi, Sakura Trick was serialized in Houbunsha's seinen manga magazine Manga Time Kirara Miracle! from March 17, 2011, to August 16, 2017. Houbunsha collected its chapters in eight tankōbon volumes, released from August 27, 2012, to September 27, 2017.

=== Anime ===
A 12-episode anime television series adaptation was announced in the August issue of the Manga Time Kirara Miracle! magazine. The series, produced by Studio Deen and directed by Kenichi Ishikura with character designs by Kyūta Sakai, aired on TBS between January 9 and March 27, 2014, and was simulcast by Crunchyroll in North America.

The opening theme is "Won (*3*) Chu KissMe!" by Haruka Tomatsu, Yuka Iguchi, Yuka Aisaka, Hiromi Igarashi, Mai Fuchigami, and Megumi Toda, whilst the ending theme is "Kiss (and) Love" by Tomatsu and Iguchi. The ending theme for episode eight is "Sakura Sweet Kiss" (桜Sweet Kiss) by Saki Fujita, Momo Asakura, and Yurika Endō. The series is licensed in North America by Sentai Filmworks. MVM Films have licensed the series in the UK.

==== Episodes ====
No.	Title	Original release date
1	"A Cherry Blossom-colored Beginning"; Transliteration: "Sakura-iro no Hajimari" (Japanese: 桜色のはじまり)	January 9, 2014
1	"Yakisoba, Verandas, and Girls"; Transliteration: "Yakisoba to Beranda to Onna no Ko" (Japanese: やきそばとベランダと女の子)	January 9, 2014
Haruka Takayama and Yuu Sonoda are best friends who are just starting high school together. As the school year begins and the two make new friends, Haruka worries that her friendship with Yuu will stop being special. After Yuu suggests that the two of them do something that is unique to them, Haruka suggests they kiss each other in secret as proof of their special friendship. Later, Haruka and Yuu get locked inside an empty classroom whilst kissing on the veranda, requiring them to cross a large gap between verandas to get to the neighbouring classroom.
2	"Yet Another Cherry Blossom Color"; Transliteration: "Mō Hitotsu no Sakura-iro" (Japanese: もうひとつの桜色)	January 16, 2014
2	"After School with Harry-chan♥"; Transliteration: "Hōkago wa Harī-chan to" (Japanese: 放課後はハリーちゃんと♥)	January 16, 2014
After Haruka and the others note Shizuku Minami behaving oddly, Kotone Nida, who is currently living with her, states Shizuku is mad at her because she kissed her on the cheek whilst she was sleeping. After speaking with Haruka and Yuu on the matter, Shizuku meets up with Kotone, stating she got mad because she felt Kotone was only staying with her because it was convenient. Kotone states she likes staying with Shizuku because of her, and the two share a mutual kiss, which Haruka and Yuu happen to come across. Later, the girls get together to try to help Yuu study for her exams instead of relying on other people's notes. After the usual methods fail due to Yuu's tendency to fall asleep, Haruka decides to use kissing to help Yuu remember the answers she needs for the test.
3	"The President is My Sister"; Transliteration: "Kaichō wa Onee-chan" (Japanese: 会長はお姉ちゃん)	January 23, 2014
3	"A Pool Cleaning Promise"; Transliteration: "Pūru Seisōte Oyakusoku" (Japanese: プール清掃てお約束)	January 23, 2014
Yuu's older sister, Mitsuki, who has never met Haruka face to face before, ends up having her glasses broken due to Yuu. Meanwhile, Yuu becomes downhearted when she learns the sports festival is being downsized to a sports meet due to the school closing in three years, meaning she will not be able to do a cheering event. Wanting to help Yuu out, Haruka and the others join the meet committee to state their case to the student council, led by Mitsuki. After some initial failures, Haruka manages to build up the courage to state her plea to Mitsuki, who considers it. Later that day, Mitsuki comes across Haruka and Yuu in a compromising situation. Later, the girls get together to clean the pool, with Haruka and Yuu finding an opportunity to do some kissing in the pool storage room.
4	"A Sour Operation?"; Transliteration: "Suppai Daisakusen?" (Japanese: すっぱい大作戦?)	January 30, 2014
4	"Is This a Test of Courage!?"; Transliteration: "Moshikashite Kimodameshi!?" (Japanese: もしかして肝試し!?)	January 30, 2014
Suspicious about the relationship between Haruka and Yuu, Mitsuki asks their classmates, Yuzu Iizuka and Kaede Ikeno, to keep an eye on them and make notes any suspicious behaviour. Later, the girls get together for a test of courage, where Mitsuki attempts to tail Haruka and Yuu, but gets mistaken by Yuu for a ghost, leaving her so scared that she asks Haruka to kiss her to calm her down.
5	"Let's Have Tea With Big Sis"; Transliteration: "Onee-chan to Ocha shiyō" (Japanese: お姉ちゃんとお茶しよう)	February 6, 2014
5	"The Witch, The Apple, and The Big Sister"; Transliteration: "Majo to Ringo to Onee-chan to" (Japanese: 魔女とリンゴとお姉ちゃんと)	February 6, 2014
With the cultural festival approaching, Haruka, Kaede, and Yuzu go to a café with Mitsuki to try and convince her to join in their class' production of Snow White. When the others arrive, Yuu displays some displeasure in having been left behind at school, due to Haruka wanting to surprise her, but the two manage to make up with each other. Later, the girls succeed in coercing Mitsuki into playing the role of Snow White, where she becomes paranoid about being kissed by Haruka during rehearsal, only to realise it was only a speech-only play.
6	"It's The Culture Festival ☆ It's a Sleepover"; Transliteration: "Bunkasai da yo ☆ Otomari desu" (Japanese: 文化祭だよ☆お泊まりです)	February 13, 2014
6	"It's The Culture Festival ☆ It's Showtime!"; Transliteration: "Bunkasai da yo ☆ Honban desu!" (Japanese: 文化祭だよ☆本番です!)	February 13, 2014
The girls decide to sleep over at school in order to complete their preparations for the cultural festival. During the night, Shizuku gets to spend some time with Kotone, whillst Haruka and Yuu also have some time together. On the day of the festival, after a successful performance, Haruka goes around the festival with Kaede and Yuzu, where Kaede explains why she chose to become the class representative. Haruka and Yuu then spend the rest of the festival together, kissing all the while.
7	"Swimsuit Fanservice ☆ Accidents Too"; Transliteration: "Mizugi de Sābisu ☆ Porori Mo Aru yo" (Japanese: 水着でサービス☆ポロリもあるよ)	February 20, 2014
7	"Shopping with Yuu-chan"; Transliteration: "Yuu-chan to Okaimono" (Japanese: 優ちゃんとお買い物)	February 20, 2014
Kotone invites the girls to swim at her family mansion's pool, where they meet Kotone's little sister Shinobu, who seems determined to have Kotone return home. Shinobu challenges Shizuku to a swimming contest to decide whom Kotone should stay with, which Shizuku ends up winning thanks to some meddling by the family maid. Later, Yuu decides she wants her own scarf, only to find the one she had her eye on was bought by Shizuku, so Haruka goes shopping with her. They find the scarf Yuu wanted, only for her to choose a different one instead.
8	"A Cherry Blossom-colored Wedding"; Transliteration: "Sakura-iro no Uedingu" (Japanese: 桜色のウエディング)	February 27, 2014
8	"A Cherry Blossom-colored Christmas"; Transliteration: "Sakura-iro na Kurisumasu" (Japanese: 桜色なクリスマス)	February 27, 2014
Haruka invites Yuu to join her in attending a relative's wedding, which Yuu misinterprets as Haruka asking her to marry her. Yuu is disappointed that this is not the case, while Haruka becomes touched by the thought of it. On Christmas Eve, Mitsuki joins Haruka and the others in visiting the Christmas lights, noticing that Haruka and Yuu seem to be shying away from each other. After Haruka and Yuu become separated from the others, Haruka reveals she had been shy to look Yuu in the face because of the strong feelings she has been having, with Yuu replying she had felt the same.
9	"The End of Year Debut of S.B.J.K"; Transliteration: "Nenmatsu Debyū no Esu Bī Jē Kē" (Japanese: 年末デビューのS·B·J·K)	March 6, 2014
9	"Return of the Sour Operation!?"; Transliteration: "Zoku – Suppai Daisakusen!?" (Japanese: 続·すっぱい大作戦!?)	March 6, 2014
Haruka and Yuu have a lengthy phone call leading up to the New Year, with Mitsuki also getting a brief opportunity to speak with Haruka. As the New Year rolls in, Yuu gives Haruka a kiss over the phone. Later, as Mitsuki becomes jealous of Haruka and Yuu linking arms with each other, she, along with Kaede and Yuzu, follow them to a park, where they almost catch them kissing. When Mitsuki trips up, Haruka manages to catch her, with Mitsuki inadvertently kissing her forehead in the process. Afterwards, Yuzu talks about her experience with learning to ride a scooter whilst Kaede laments the trouble she has with her siblings.
10	"Memories and Surprises of a Snowy Day"; Transliteration: "Yuki no Hi to Omoide to Shōgeki" (Japanese: 雪の日と思い出と衝撃)	March 13, 2014
10	"A Promise in the Gym Storage"; Transliteration: "Taiiku Sōko de Oyakusoku" (Japanese: 体育倉庫でお約束)	March 13, 2014
On a snowy day, Haruka and Shizuku go outside to have their lunch, though they soon find it a bit too cold. As Shizuku dreads the day when she will have to part ways with Kotone, Haruka brings Kotone over to cheer her up, encouraging everyone else to come out for a snowball fight. Meanwhile, Kaede mentions to Mitsuki how she believes Haruka and Yuu are dating. Later during gym, Haruka feels the need to compete against Kaede in jumprope, only for her group to end up coming last and having to clear up the equipment. As Haruka offers to do it alone and the others leave, the teacher assumes they were finished and ends up locking Haruka in the gym storage. Learning of Haruka's disappearance, the girls set up a ladder to the gym storage's window, where Yuu manages to get a kiss with Haruka before they get the door unlocked.
11	"The President is SumiSumi!"; Transliteration: "Kaichō wa SumiSumi na no ja!" (Japanese: 会長はスミスミなのじゃ!)	March 20, 2014
11	"The Cherry Blossom-colored Truth"; Transliteration: "Sakura-iro no Shinjitsu" (Japanese: 桜色の真実)	March 20, 2014
Kaede introduces Haruka and Yuu to Sumi Otokawa, who is to succeed Mitsuki as student council president, who asks for their help in deciding what to do for Mitsuki and student council vice-president Rina Sakai for their graduation. The three of them decide to investigate the third years, and, finding them to have a peculiar fondness for pudding, decide on holding a 'bucket pudding contest'. After Sumi takes her leave, Mitsuki and Rina walk in on Haruka and Yuu kissing each other, leading to Mitsuki forbidding Haruka from kissing Yuu and having Kaede keep an eye on them. Haruka finds ways to sneak some kisses in anyway during dance classes. Meanwhile, after speaking with Sumi, Mitsuki comes to the realization that she herself is in love with Haruka.
12	"Pudding and Mitsuki's Decision"; Transliteration: "Purin to Mitsuki no Ketsui" (Japanese: プリンと美月の決意)	March 27, 2014
12	"Sakura Trick"; Transliteration: "Sakura Torikku" (Japanese: 桜Trick)	March 27, 2014
The graduation party for Mitsuki and Rina gets underway, with everyone giving them presents. During the party, as Yuu gets into an argument with Mitsuki over her kissing relationship with Haruka, Mitsuki, upon hearing that their kissing is only part of a 'special friendship' they share, confesses her love to Haruka. Following the graduation ceremony, Mitsuki meets with Haruka, who discovers she knows nothing about love or dating and who also misinterpreted Mitsuki's earlier love confession. Haruka ends up rejecting Mitsuki, who left her with just a kiss on the forehead. Yuu, who had been watching them, brings Haruka to the old classroom, where they kiss whilst professing their love for each other in order to determine what kind of "love" Mitsuki was talking about earlier. As they do so, Yuu and Haruka feel embarrassed as they realize that they are actually in a romantic loving intimate relationship. With their feelings now stronger than ever, Haruka and Yuu begin their second year of school.

=== Other media ===
Characters from the series appear alongside other Manga Time Kirara characters in the 2017 mobile RPG Kirara Fantasia.

== Reception ==
=== Critical reception ===
The series' characters were praised by several reviewers. Richard Eisenbeis of Kotaku acclaimed the "flawed" main characters as being "very human", with particular praise for their development through the narrative. He also commended the show's straightforward depiction of Haruka and Yu navigating their relationship, which he felt avoided the common cliche of having a series end right as a relationship began. Similarly, Chris Beveridge of The Fandom Post spoke positively of the "great character arc" that "focuse[d] on the relationship itself" in relation to the show's themes of interpersonal connection and dependence.

Critics differed on opinions regarding the series' visual portrayal of the characters. Anime UK News praised the "very well executed" yuri scenes, which were compared favorably to ecchi anime for being a "lot less exploitative". In contrast, Carlos Ross of THEM Anime Reviews felt that the anime's visuals were "exploitative" at times, and that the show was "very much" driven by fan service. Erica Friedman of Yuricon wrote that the manga had "much less pervasive" fan service and gave the characters a 7/10 rating for being "two and a half dimensional".

The series' representation of lesbian relationships received mixed-to-positive reviews. Ross argued that while there was a "certain earnest sweetness" to the relationships, the show lacked a "serious treatment" of LGBT themes. On the other hand, Beveridge commended the anime as a "positive" and "accessible" show that stood out for having lesbian lead characters, a rare occurrence at the time of release. Similarly, Eisenbeis praised the show's approach to social issues in Japan, opining that the story showed that social acceptance of same-sex relationships was possible.

The plot and story were divisive among critics. Many critics felt that the story lacked depth, with Rebecca Silverman of Anime News Network describing it as "fluff" and Carl Kimlinger of the same site opining that it had a "general distaste for substance". Friedman, reviewing the debut manga volume, declared that the story value was "none", though she improved her assessment for the second volume. Eisenbeis was more enthused, opining that the anime's plot stood out from other slice-of-life shows by having episodes connect into a "greater narrative", which he felt preserved an "overriding continuity" while allowing "fun standalone stories". Anime UK News argued that despite the show's appearance, it was an "must-see" for yuri fans for the quality of the story's romantic comedy elements.

The anime's production value was generally well received. Anime UK News called it a "good-looking" series for its use of colors and textures and compared it favorably to the director's previous work, Hidamari Sketch. Eisenbeis concurred, praising the "clever direction" of the visuals, such as the use of symbols to represent characters during transitional scenes. He concluded that the show "succeeded in what it was trying to do in every way" and named it as his favorite anime of the Winter 2014 season. Beveridge was enthused with the "great character designs" and "very enjoyable pacing", and in a retrospective review ten years after release, he remarked that it "[held] up pretty well".
