= Joshi Kōsei to Mahō no Note =

Japanese novel series

- First novel volume cover

女子高生と魔法のノート (Joshi Kōsei to Mahō no Noto)
- Genre: Fantasy
- Novel series
- Written by: Kenichi Kakutani
- Published by: Wakasa Seikatsu; Discover 21
- Imprint: Discover Business Publishing
- Original run: July 17, 2020 – present
- Volumes: 2
- Manga
- Written by: Kenichi Kakutani
- Illustrated by: Kumiko Yamaguchi
- Published by: Wakasa Seikatsu
- Magazine: Wakasa Seikatsu Bookstore
- Original run: September 18, 2021 – 2022
- Volumes: 1
- Anime film
- Directed by: Mitsuho Seta
- Produced by: Yosuke Ito; Kaoru Miyamoto (CG)
- Written by: Mitsuho Seta
- Music by: Takaaki Nakahashi
- Studio: Noovo
- Released: July 31, 2022

Joshi Kōsei to Mahō no Note (女子高生と魔法のノート, Joshi Kōsei to Mahō no Noto; "High School Girl and The Magic Notebook") is a Japanese fantasy novel series by Kenichi Kakutani, which is the president of the Kyoto-based company Wakasa Seikatsu. Discover 21 have published two volumes since July 2020 under their Discover Business Publishing imprint. A six-chapter manga adaptation with art by Kumiko Yamaguchi was serialized online via the Wakasa Seikatsu Bookstore website from September 2021 to 2022. It was collected in a single tankōbon volume. An anime film adaptation by Noovo premiered in Kyoto in July 2022.

== Characters ==
Bulbul-kun (ブルブルくん, Buruburu-kun; aka. Fairy of Blueberry)
Voiced by: Satsumi Matsuda
Yuzuki Shito (紫藤結月, Shito Yuzuki)
Voiced by: Madoka Asahina

== Media ==
=== Novels ===
| No. | Release date | ISBN |
|---|---|---|
| 1 | July 17, 2020 | 978-4-910-28600-6 |
| 2 | July 16, 2021 | 978-4-910-28603-7 |

=== Manga ===
A six-chapter manga adaptation with art by Kumiko Yamaguchi was serialized online via the Wakasa Seikatsu Bookstore website from September 18, 2021, to 2022. It was collected in a single tankōbon volume.

| No. | Release date | ISBN |
|---|---|---|
| 1 | July 20, 2022 | 978-4-903-95450-9 |

=== Anime ===
An anime adaptation animated by Noovo and directed by Mitsuho Seta was announced on September 18, 2021. It was produced by Yosuke Ito and Kaoru Miyamoto and written by Seta, with Takaaki Nakahashi composing the music. It premiered as a film in Kyoto on July 31, 2022.
