= Idol × Idol Story! =

Japanese manga series

- First tankōbon volume cover
- Genre: Drama, slice of life
- Manga
- Written by: Shōtarō Tokunō
- Published by: Houbunsha
- English publisher: NA: Seven Seas Entertainment
- Imprint: FUZ Comics
- Magazine: Comic Fuz
- Original run: August 25, 2022 – present
- Volumes: 11

Idol × Idol Story! is a Japanese manga series written and illustrated by Shōtarō Tokunō. It began serialization on Houbunsha's Comic Fuz manga website in August 2022. Its chapters have been compiled into eleven volumes as of August 2026.

== Plot ==
Mimi Nagisa is a former idol now working part-time at a convenience store, having retired from the industry after her group's failure. Having already given up on her idol dreams, her life changes when she encounters Ibuki Nanakusa, a fellow idol she met in the past who admired her. Mimi is embarrassed to meet Ibuki again, being ashamed of her past, but after Super Star Ship, a big audition is announced for aspiring idols, Ibuki convinces Mimi to give being an idol another shot. With Mimi now aspiring to become an idol again, the two work together towards their dreams and making it to Super Star Ship.

== Characters ==
Mimi Nagisa (渚 美海, Nagisa Mimi)
A 22-year-old university graduate, who is currently working at a convenience store. She is a former member of the idol group Stella, which disbanded after three years of limited success. Since then, Mimi has been trying to find a "real" job, having given up on her idol dreams. However, she is inspired to try out being an idol again after Ibuki influences her to try out for Super Star Ship.
Ibuki Nanakusa (七種 依吹, Nanakusa Ibuki)
An idol who admired Mimi. She was previously a member of a group called Sugar Smile. She was worried about what happened to her after Stella disbanded. She lives in the same neighborhood as Mimi.

== Publication ==
Written and illustrated by Shōtarō Tokunō, Idol × Idol Story! began serialization on Houbunsha's Comic Fuz manga website on August 25, 2022. Its chapters have been compiled into eleven tankōbon volumes as of August 2026.

In October 2024, Seven Seas Entertainment announced that they had licensed the series for English publication beginning in April 2025.

No.	Original release date	Original ISBN	North American release date	North American ISBN
1	April 27, 2023	978-4-8322-3990-6	April 29, 2025	979-8-89373-150-7
1. "The Idol I Adore"; 2. "Restart"; 3. "Second Screening Part 1"; 4. "Second Screening Part 2"; 5. "Setting Sail"
2	June 1, 2023	978-4-8322-3998-2	July 15, 2025	979-8-89373-151-4
6. "The Third Screening Begins"; 7. "Ranking Announcement"; 8. "4 × 4 Team Test Begins"; 9. "Part Assignments"; 10. "Idol Otaku"; 11. "Sorry, Mimisuke"; 12. "The Futaba Sisters"
3	November 1, 2023	978-4-8322-0337-2	October 21, 2025	979-8-89373-420-1
13. "Future Path"; 14. "Solidarity"; 15. "Dark Star A, Team Kairin"; 16. "What Dreams Mei Come"; 17. "Bright Star A, Team Hitoe"; 18. "Hopeless"; 19. "People Are Scary"; 20. "What Is Happiness?"
4	April 1, 2024	978-4-8322-0384-6	January 13, 2026	979-8-89373-640-3
21. "Ranking Results of the 4 × 4 Team Test"; 22. "The First Eliminee"; 23. "Various Motives"; 24. "Jinxed"; 25. "Star Capture Battle"; 26. "Clandestine Act"; 27. "Kind Big Sister"; 28. "I Want to Get Better"
5	August 1, 2024	978-4-8322-0420-1	April 14, 2026	979-8-89373-641-0
29. "Junior High and High School Graduations"; 30. "Justification"; 31. "Confidence"; 32. "Versus 15 Sparring"; 33. "Weak Spot"; 34. "Open Book"; 35. "The Reason She Sings"; 36. "The Night Before"; 36.5. "The Senba Siblings"
6	December 26, 2024	978-4-8322-0469-0	August 4, 2026	979-8-89561-361-0
37. "Departure"; 38. "Changes"; 39. "Senpo Battle"; 40. "Is That All You've Got?"; 41. "Jiho Battle"; 42. "Chuken Battle"; 43. "Inner Scream"; 44. "Fukusho Battle"
7	April 1, 2025	978-4-8322-0491-1	December 1, 2026	979-8-89561-995-7
8	August 1, 2025	978-4-8322-0531-4	April 6, 2027	979-8-89765-740-7
9	December 1, 2025	978-4-8322-0566-6	—	—
10	April 1, 2026	978-4-8322-0603-8	—	—
11	August 3, 2026	978-4-8322-0637-3	—	—
12	December 1, 2026	978-4-8322-0673-1	—	—

== Reception ==
The series was nominated for the tenth Next Manga Awards in the web category.

== See also ==
- New Game!, another manga series by the same creator
