= Megumi Toda =

Japanese voice actress (born 1990)

- 戸田 めぐみ
- Born: December 8, 1990 (age 35); Tokyo, Japan
- Occupation: Voice actress
- Years active: 2012–present
- Agent: Kenyu Office
- Website: Official profile

Megumi Toda (戸田 めぐみ, Toda Megumi; born December 8, 1990) is a Japanese voice actress from Tokyo affiliated with Kenyu Office. She was regular on the Animate Pia Channel, which was broadcast on Nico Nico. Her major roles include Hajime Shinoda in New Game!, Kiitan in Etotama and Yuzu Iizuka in Sakura Trick. As part of the Etotama cast, she sang on the theme song under the group Soruaru BOB on a single called "blue moment" that reached number 49 on the Oricon charts. She also sang the theme songs for New Game! under the group forfolium; the singles "Sakura" and "Now Loading!!" reached numbers 33 and 42 on Oricon. As part of the Idolmaster cast, she sang on one of the singles which reached number 22.

== Filmography ==
=== Anime ===
List of voice performances in anime
Year	Title	Role	Notes	Ref.
2012	Sengoku Collection	Kindergarten pupil		
2012–14	Oshiri Kajiri Mushi	Sakura-san		
2013	Kingdom	Concubine	2nd TV series	
2014	Space Dandy	Waitress		
2014	Hamatora	Woman at funeral home		
2014	Sakura Trick	Yuzu Iizuka		
2014	Hozuki's Coolheadedness	Various characters	Also OVA in 2016	
2014	Baby Steps	Announcer		
2015	Yurikuma Arashi	Student		
2015	Durarara!!×2	Non		
2015	Triage X	Arisa Nanjo		
2015	Etotama	Kiitan		
2015	Rampo Kitan: Game of Laplace	Hostess		
2015	Dance with Devils	Voice		
2015	The Perfect Insider	Deborah		
2015	Brave Beats	Hidefumi Tanaka		
2016	Pandora in the Crimson Shell: Ghost Urn	Receptionist		
2016	Rainbow Days	Chiba, Female student		
2016	Twin Star Exorcists	Katsunori Amarube		
2016	New Game!	Hajime Shinoda		
2017	Seven Mortal Sins	Maria Totsuka		
2017	New Game!	Hajime Shinoda		
2018	Asobi Asobase	Aguri Matō		
2019	The Ones Within	Sakura Oshigiri		
2019	Pastel Memories	Komachi Satonaka		
2021	Peach Boy Riverside	Carrot		
2021	The Dungeon of Black Company	Shia		
2024	Hamidashi Creative	Hiyori Izumi		
2025	Medalist	Mario Nachi		

=== Films ===
List of voice performances in feature films
Year	Title	Role	Notes	Ref.
2016	Pop in Q	Nana Mitsuhashi		
2016	Shimajiro in Bookland	Voice		

=== Video games ===
List of voice performances in video games
Year	Title	Role	Notes	Ref.
2008	Cooking Mama: World Kitchen	Kate		
2013	The Idolmaster: Million Live	Ayumu Maihama		
2016	Summon Night 6	Cassis カシス		
2016	Genkai Tokki: Seven Pirates	Doroa		
2018	Onsen Musume: Yunohana Collection	Mana Wakura		
2020	100% Orange Juice!	Miusaki		
2022	Azur Lane	Giuseppe Garibaldi		
2023	Master Detective Archives: Rain Code	Kurumi Wendy		
