= List of The Misfit of Demon King Academy episodes =

The Misfit of Demon King Academy is an anime television series based on the light novel series of the same title written by Shu and illustrated by Yoshinori Shizuma. The adaptation was announced at the "Dengeki Bunko Aki no Namahōsō Festival" event on October 6, 2019. The anime was originally set to premiere in April 2020, but it was delayed until July 2020 due to production complications resulting from the COVID-19 pandemic. The series was animated by Silver Link and directed by Masafumi Tamura, with Shin Oonuma serving as chief director. Jin Tanaka handled the series composition, while Kazuyuki Yamayoshi designed the characters, and Keiji Inai composed the music. The 13-episode anime aired from July 4 to September 26, 2020. Civilian performed the opening theme "Seikai Fuseikai" (正解不正解; "Correct Incorrect"), while Tomori Kusunoki performed the ending theme "Hamidashimono" (ハミダシモノ). Crunchyroll streamed the series. On September 4, 2020, Aniplex of America announced that the series would receive an English dub, which premiered the following day.

On March 6, 2021, it was announced that the series would receive a second split-cour season with the staff and cast reprising their respective roles. Yūichirō Umehara replaced Tatsuhisa Suzuki as the voice of Anos Voldigoad for the second season. The second season was later revealed to be titled as The Misfit of Demon King Academy II and its first cour aired from January 8 to September 24, 2023. The first opening theme is "Seien" by Lenny code fiction, while the first ending theme is "Esoa" (エソア) by Momosumomosu. On February 11, 2023, it was announced that the seventh episode of the season and beyond would be postponed due to COVID-19. The season restarted broadcasting from the first episode on July 9, 2023. (Note: Tokyo MX listed the restart at 24:30 on July 8, 2023, which is effectively July 9 at 12:30 a.m.) The second cour aired from April 13 to July 25, 2024. (Note: Tokyo MX listed the premiere of the second cour at 24:00 on April 12, 2024, which is effectively April 13 at 12:00 a.m.) The second opening theme is "Maō" (魔王; "Demon King") by Burnout Syndromes and Nao Tōyama, while the second ending theme is "Shingetsu" (シンゲツ; "New Moon") by Tomori Kusunoki.

== Series overview ==
Season	Episodes		Originally released	
Season	Episodes		First released	Last released
1	13		July 4, 2020	September 26, 2020
2	24	12	January 8, 2023	September 24, 2023
2	24	12	April 13, 2024	July 25, 2024

== Episodes ==
=== Season 1 (2020) ===
No. overall	No. in season	Title (Note: English translated titles are taken from Crunchyroll.)	Directed by	Written by	Storyboarded by	Original release date	Ref.
1	1	"The Misfit of Demon King Academy"; Transliteration: "Maō Gakuin no Futekigōsha" (Japanese: 魔王学院の不適合者)	Masafumi Tamura	Jin Tanaka	Masafumi Tamura	July 4, 2020	
2	2	"The Witch of Destruction"; Transliteration: "Hametsu no Majo" (Japanese: 破滅の魔女)	Junya Koshiba	Jin Tanaka	Masayoshi Nishida	July 11, 2020	
3	3	"Sasha's True Intentions"; Transliteration: "Sāsha no Shin'i" (Japanese: サーシャの真意)	Yamato Ouchi	Jin Tanaka	Hiroyuki Shimazu	July 18, 2020	
4	4	"15th Birthday"; Transliteration: "Jū go no Tanjōbi" (Japanese: 十五の誕生日)	Yūsuke Sekine	Jin Tanaka	Masafumi Tamura	July 25, 2020	
5	5	"The Transfer Student"; Transliteration: "Ten'nyūsei" (Japanese: 転入生)	Yoshifumi Sueda	Tamaho Ouchi	Yoshifumi Sueda	August 1, 2020	
6	6	"Magic Sword Tournament"; Transliteration: "Maken Taikai" (Japanese: 魔剣大会)	Jun Fukuda	Tamaho Ouchi	Masayoshi Nishida	August 8, 2020	
7	7	"Mother's Words"; Transliteration: "Haha no Kotoba" (Japanese: 母の言葉)	Masafumi Tamura	Tamaho Ouchi	Masafumi Tamura	August 15, 2020	
8	8	"The Final Duel"; Transliteration: "Futari no Kesshōsen" (Japanese: 二人の決勝戦)	Junya Koshiba	Tamaho Ouchi	Mizuka Saito	August 22, 2020	
9	9	"The Mystery of the Hero Academy"; Transliteration: "Yūsha Gakuin no Nazo" (Japanese: 勇者学院の謎)	Yamato Ouchi	Jin Tanaka	Hiroyuki Shimazu	August 29, 2020	
10	10	"Inter-Academy Exams"; Transliteration: "Gakuin Betsu Taikō Shiken" (Japanese: 学院別対抗試験)	Yuki Inaba	Jin Tanaka	Yoshifumi Sueda	September 5, 2020	
11	11	"The Glow of Life"; Transliteration: "Inochi no Kagayaki" (Japanese: 命の輝き)	Yoshinobu Tokumoto	Jin Tanaka	Keisuke Inoue, Masafumi Tamura	September 12, 2020	
12	12	"Taboo Magic"; Transliteration: "Kinki no Mahō" (Japanese: 禁忌の魔法)	Jun Fukuda	Jin Tanaka	Yoshinobu Tokumoto	September 19, 2020	
13	13	"Let the World Be Filled with Love"; Transliteration: "Sekai ga Ai ni Michiru Yō ni" (Japanese: 世界が愛に満ちるように)	Masafumi Tamura	Jin Tanaka	Masafumi Tamura	September 26, 2020	

=== Season 2 (2023) ===
No. overall	No. in season	Title	Directed by	Written by	Storyboarded by	Original release date	Ref.
Part 1
14	1	"A Lesson by God"; Transliteration: "Kami no Jugyō" (Japanese: 神の授業)	Junya Koshiba	Jin Tanaka	Masafumi Tamura	January 8, 2023	
15	2	"The Demon King in a Battle of Wits"; Transliteration: "Maō no chie kurabe" (Japanese: 魔王の知恵比べ)	Masafumi Tamura	Tamaho Ouchi	Masafumi Tamura	January 15, 2023	
16	3	"The Spirit's School Building"; Transliteration: "Seirei no Gakusha" (Japanese: 精霊の学舎)	Yusuke Onoda	Subaru Yoneyama	Masafumi Tamura	January 22, 2023	
17	4	"The Spirit's Trial"; Transliteration: "Seirei no Shiren" (Japanese: 精霊の試練)	Junya Koshiba	Jin Tanaka	Koji Sawai, Masafumi Tamura	January 29, 2023	
18	5	"Between Royalty and Mixed Blood"; Transliteration: "Kōzoku to Konketsu no Hazama de" (Japanese: 皇族と混血の狭間で)	Jun Fukuda	Subaru Yoneyama	Yūichi Nihei	February 5, 2023	
19	6	"The Great Mother Spirit and the Demon King's Right-Hand Man"; Transliteration: "Hahanaru dai Seirei to Maō no Migiude" (Japanese: 母なる大精霊と魔王の右腕)	Yusuke Onoda	Tamaho Ouchi	Masayoshi Nishida	February 12, 2023	
20	7	"Like a Single Stroke of a Sword"; Transliteration: "Tada Hitofuri no Ken Nogotoku" (Japanese: ただ一振りの剣の如く)	Junya Koshiba	Subaru Yoneyama	Kousaki Nishimoto, Masafumi Tamura	August 20, 2023	
21	8	"The Land of Demons Without a Demon King"; Transliteration: "Maō no Inai Mazoku no Kuni" (Japanese: 魔王のいない魔族の国)	Rokō Ogiwara	Naoki Takahashi, Katsuji Matsumoto, Jiehuan Chen, Chia-Yun Zhao, Sinhua Li, Lan Ma	Shin Oonuma, Masayoshi Nishida	August 27, 2023	
22	9	"A Prayer for Two Thousand Years Later"; Transliteration: "Ni Sennen go ni Kotowari o Komete" (Japanese: 二千年後に断りを込めて)	Masafumi Tamura	Tamaho Ouchi	Masafumi Tamura	September 3, 2023	
23	10	"Send Hatred to the Past"; Transliteration: "Nikushimi wa Kako ni" (Japanese: 憎しみは過去に)	Yusuke Onoda	Subaru Yoneyama	Masayoshi Nishida, Masafumi Tamura	September 10, 2023	
24	11	"To Sever That Fate"; Transliteration: "Sono Shukumei o Kotowaraki ro Tame ni" (Japanese: その宿命を断らきろために)	Yusuke Sekine	Tamaho Ouchi	Koichi Ohata	September 17, 2023	
25	12	"The Misfit"; Transliteration: "Futekigōsha" (Japanese: 不適合者)	Masafumi Tamura	Jin Tanaka	Masafumi Tamura	September 24, 2023	
Part 2
26	13	"Moon of Creation"; Transliteration: "Sōzō no Tsuki" (Japanese: 創造の月)	Shin Oonuma, Yusuke Sekine	Jin Tanaka	Shin Oonuma, Yusuke Sekine	April 13, 2024	
27	14	"Goddess of Selection"; Transliteration: "Sentei no Megami" (Japanese: 選定の神)	Shigeki Awai	Tamaho Ouchi	Kazuaki Mōri	April 20, 2024	
28	15	"Institute of the Gods"; Transliteration: "Jindai no Gakufu" (Japanese: 神代の学府)	Yusuke Onoda	Kō Yoneyama	Masafumi Tamura	April 27, 2024	
29	16	"With a Pinch of Courage"; Transliteration: "Chippo Kenayūki o Awasenagara" (Japanese: ちっぽけな勇気を合わせながら)	Junya Koshiba	Tamaho Ouchi	Yūichi Nihei	May 4, 2024	
30	17	"Battle of Pride"; Transliteration: "Hokori no Tatakai" (Japanese: 誇りの戦い)	Shigeki Awai	Jin Tanaka	Kōki Onoue, Masafumi Tamura	May 11, 2024	
31	18	"Almighty Demon King"; Transliteration: "Zen'nōnaru Maō" (Japanese: 全能なる魔王)	Naoyoshi Kusaka	Kō Yoneyama	Masafumi Tamura	May 18, 2024	
32	19	"The Great Demon King Drills"; Transliteration: "Dai Maō Kyōren" (Japanese: 大魔王教練)	Yusuke Onoda	Tamaho Ouchi	Toshinori Narita	June 1, 2024	
33	20	"Kingdom of the Dragon God"; Transliteration: "Shin Ryū no Kuni" (Japanese: 神竜の国)	Shigeki Awai	Jin Tanaka	Seiji Okuda, Masafumi Tamura	June 8, 2024	
34	21	"Demon King Hymn No. 6 'Neighbors'"; Transliteration: "Maō Sanbika Dai Rokuban 'Rinjin'" (Japanese: 魔王讃美歌第6番『隣人』)	Yasushi Sugimura	Tamaho Ouchi	Masafumi Tamura	June 15, 2024	
35	22	"Liebarschend, the God of Vestiges"; Transliteration: "Konseki-shin Rībarushuneddo" (Japanese: 痕跡神リーバルシュネッド)	Yusuke Onoda	Tamaho Ouchi	Yō Nakano	June 29, 2024	
36	23	"The Promise Made in a Dream"; Transliteration: "Yume de Kawashita Yakusoku" (Japanese: 夢で交わした約束)	Naoyoshi Kusaka	Kō Yoneyama	Kazuaki Mōri	July 4, 2024	
37	24	"The Dream That God Saw"; Transliteration: "Kami no Mita Yume" (Japanese: 神の見た夢)	Junya Koshiba	Jin Tanaka	Masafumi Tamura	July 25, 2024	
