= New Game! =

Japanese manga series and its franchise

- Cover of New Game! volume 1 by Hobunsha featuring Aoba Suzukaze
- Genre: Comedy
- Manga
- Written by: Shōtarō Tokunō
- Published by: Houbunsha
- English publisher: NA: Seven Seas Entertainment
- Magazine: Manga Time Kirara Carat
- Original run: January 28, 2013 – August 27, 2021
- Volumes: 13
- Anime television series

New Game! (season 1) New Game!! (season 2)
- Directed by: Yoshiyuki Fujiwara
- Written by: Fumihiko Shimo
- Music by: Hajime Hyakkoku
- Studio: Doga Kobo
- Licensed by: Crunchyroll (streaming); SA/SEA: Muse Communication
- Original network: AT-X, Tokyo MX, TVA, MBS, BS11
- Original run: July 4, 2016 – September 26, 2017
- Episodes: 24 + OVA
- Video game

New Game! The Challenge Stage
- Developer: 5pb.
- Publisher: 5pb.
- Genre: Visual novel
- Platform: PlayStation 4, PlayStation Vita
- Released: JP: January 26, 2017
- icon

New Game! is a Japanese four-panel manga series by Shōtarō Tokunō, which was serialized in Houbunsha's seinen manga magazine Manga Time Kirara Carat from January 2013 to August 2021 and is licensed in English by Seven Seas Entertainment.

The series is set in Tokyo's Suginami Ward and follows 19-year-old Japanese game developer Aoba Suzukaze and her acquaintances on their adventures through the ups and downs of game development, from making the perfect character design to fixing all the errors that inevitably accumulate in the process.

An anime television series adaptation by Doga Kobo aired in Japan between July and September 2016, with a second season airing between July and September 2017. A video game developed by 5pb. was released in January 2017.

== Plot ==
Having been inspired by the character designs of a particular video game when she was younger, Aoba Suzukaze, a high school graduate, begins working as a character designer for Eagle Jump, the video game's developer. As she works on modelling and designing characters for video games in development, she becomes acquainted with her female colleagues in the character design department, as well as those from within the company.

== Characters ==
Aoba Suzukaze (涼風 青葉, Suzukaze Aoba)
Voiced by: Yūki Takada (Japanese); Megan Shipman (English)
A twintailed high school graduate who joins the Eagle Jump video game company as a character designer, as they made her favorite game. Due to her small stature, she is often mistaken for a middle school student. She has a weak tolerance for alcohol. She currently lives with her parents and commutes to the office.
Ko Yagami (八神 コウ, Yagami Kō)
Voiced by: Yoko Hikasa (Japanese); Michelle Rojas (English)
The lead character designer of Eagle Jump. She spends a lot of time at the office, often sleeping there overnight in her panties, and has a laid-back but stern attitude. She was the character designer for the game that inspired Aoba to become one herself. After two years pass in the story, she goes to work at the Blue Rose video game company in France alongside Christina's sister Catarine. In the final chapter of the series it is revealed that she married Rin after Japan legalized same-sex marriage.
Rin Toyama (遠山 りん, Tōyama Rin)
Voiced by: Ai Kayano (Japanese); Kristen McGuire (English)
An art director and head of the background department. She is close friends with Ko and is implied to have feelings for her; thus, she tends to get jealous when others get close to her. Unlike Ko, she is organized, well maintained and also a bit shy. In the final chapter she is seen with a ring and it's confirmed she married Ko.
Hifumi Takimoto (滝本 ひふみ, Takimoto Hifumi)
Voiced by: Megumi Yamaguchi (Japanese); Jill Harris (English)
A character designer. She is shy about talking to others and prefers to speak via e-mail. She has a pet hedgehog named Sojiro and secretly enjoys cosplay.
Hajime Shinoda (篠田 はじめ, Shinoda Hajime)
Voiced by: Megumi Toda (Japanese); Tia Ballard (English)
A motion designer who works in the character design department as there are no open seats in the animation department. She later takes on the additional role of game planner. She enjoys sentai shows and owns various prop weapons.
Yun Iijima (飯島 ゆん, Iijima Yun)
Voiced by: Ayumi Takeo (Japanese); Leah Clark (English)
A character designer who designs monsters and often dresses in gothic clothing. She speaks with an Osaka dialect and has two younger siblings.
Nene Sakura (桜 ねね, Sakura Nene)
Voiced by: Madoka Asahina (Japanese); Bryn Apprill (English)
Aoba's friend from high school who is currently in university. After working a summer job as a playtester for Eagle Jump, she takes an interest in designing games herself and soon joins the company as a programmer in Umiko's department.
Umiko Ahagon (阿波根 うみこ, Ahagon Umiko)
Voiced by: Chitose Morinaga (Japanese); Caitlin Glass (English)
A programmer who often gets annoyed when she has to fix errors and is embarrassed by her surname. She is a military fan and has several airsoft guns in her workspace.
Shizuku Hazuki (葉月 しずく, Hazuki Shizuku)
Voiced by: Eri Kitamura (Japanese); Carli Mosier (English)
A game director with a strong interest in cute girls, hence why her department is entirely female. She is often told off by Umiko for making impulsive changes to the game design and for sneaking away from her desk when she should be working. She owns a cat named Mozuku that she brings to work.
Christina Wako Yamato (大和・クリスティーナ・和子, Yamato Kurisutīna Wako)
Voiced by: Kaori Nazuka (Japanese); Elizabeth Maxwell (English)
A half-French producer who works at Eagle Jump's publishing company, Houbundo. Although often having a strict appearance, she is shy around others. Her sister Catarine works at the Blue Rose video game company in France.
Momiji Mochizuki (望月 紅葉, Mochizuki Momiji)
Voiced by: Arisa Suzuki (Japanese); Jad Saxton (English)
A girl who joins Eagle Jump as a graphic artist during the story's second year. She lives with Tsubame, who calls her "Momo" for short, and considers Aoba to be her rival.
Tsubame Narumi (鳴海 ツバメ, Narumi Tsubame)
Voiced by: Hitomi Ōwada (Japanese); Jeannie Tirado (English)
A girl who joins Eagle Jump as a programmer during the story's second year, nicknamed "Naru". Her family owns an inn in Hokkaido, and they initially disapproved of her decision to enter the game industry.
Hotaru Hoshikawa (星川 ほたる, Hoshikawa Hotaru)
Voiced by: Manaka Iwami (Japanese); Madeleine Morris (English)
Aoba and Nene's friend from high school, who was part of their school's Art Club. She is a skilled artist, but has a health condition that can cause her to faint easily. She is currently studying at a fine arts college in order to become a professional illustrator. She also studied in France for a time.
Chinatsu Hidaka (日高 ちなつ, Hidaka Chinatsu)
A teacher in Aoba and Nene's high school, who is good friends with Hotaru. Despite being an advisor for the Art Club, she has no drawing skills of her own and often prefers to play baseball.
Catarine Towa Yamato (大和・カタリーヌ・十和, Yamato Kararīnu Towa)
Christina's sister who works at the Blue Rose video game company in France.
Sophie Waon Yamato (大和・ソフィー・和音, Yamato Sofī Waon)
Christina and Catarine's younger sister, who lives with Catarine in France.

== Media ==
=== Manga ===
The original manga by Shōtarō Tokunō began serialization in Houbunsha's Manga Time Kirara Carat magazine from January 28, 2013. Houbunsha has published thirteen tankōbon volumes since February 27, 2014. The fifth volume, subtitled The Spinoff!, takes place prior to the main series and features content not included in the magazine serialization. Seven Seas Entertainment licensed the series in North America. Three comic anthologies were released from August 2016 to August 2017. The series ended in Manga Time Kirara Carat's October 2021 issue on August 27, 2021.

No.	Original release date	Original ISBN	English release date	English ISBN
1	February 27, 2014	978-4-8322-4414-6	March 27, 2018	978-1-626927-76-6
2	March 27, 2015	978-4-8322-4546-4	May 29, 2018	978-1-626927-85-8
3	January 27, 2016	978-4-8322-4656-0	September 25, 2018	978-1-626929-00-5
4	July 27, 2016	978-4-8322-4720-8	December 4, 2018	978-1-626929-62-3
5	July 27, 2016	978-4-8322-4721-5	March 26, 2019	978-1-642750-14-0
6	June 27, 2017	978-4-8322-4847-2	July 23, 2019	978-1-642751-05-5
7	March 27, 2018	978-4-8322-4929-5	October 29, 2019	978-1-642757-11-8
8	October 25, 2018	978-4-8322-4986-8	February 18, 2020	978-1-64505-205-0
9	June 27, 2019	978-4-8322-7101-2	May 12, 2020	978-1-64505-455-9
10	January 27, 2020	978-4-8322-7153-1	November 17, 2020	978-1-64505-766-6
11	August 27, 2020	978-4-8322-7209-5	June 1, 2021	978-1-64827-108-3
12	March 26, 2021	978-4-8322-7262-0	March 8, 2022	978-1-64827-353-7
13	September 27, 2021	978-4-8322-7306-1	June 7, 2022	978-1-6385-8281-6

No.	Title	Japanese release date	Japanese ISBN
1	New Game! Anthology Comic 1 New Game! アンソロジーコミック 1	August 27, 2016	978-4-8322-4740-6
2	New Game! Anthology Comic 2 New Game! アンソロジーコミック 2	July 27, 2017	978-4-8322-4859-5
3	New Game! Anthology Comic 3 New Game! アンソロジーコミック 3	August 26, 2017	978-4-8322-4867-0

=== Anime ===
A 12-episode anime television series adaptation aired in Japan between July 4 and September 19, 2016, and was simulcast by Crunchyroll. The anime is produced by Doga Kobo, with Yoshiyuki Fujiwara as the director and Fumihiko Shimo as the series' script supervisor, featuring character designs by Ai Kikuchi. An original video animation (OVA) episode was made available for those who purchased all six Blu-ray/DVD volumes of the series, released between September 28, 2016, and February 24, 2017. The opening and ending themes respectively are "Sakura Skip" (SAKURAスキップ, Sakura Sukippu) and "Now Loading!!!", both performed by Fourfolium (Yūki Takada, Megumi Yamaguchi, Ayumi Takeo, and Megumi Toda). A second season titled New Game!! (stylized as NEW GAME!!) was announced in February 2017, and aired in Japan between July 11 and September 26, 2017, and was simulcast by Crunchyroll. The second season's opening theme is "Step by Step Up ↑↑↑↑" while the ending themes are "Jumpin' Jump Up!!!!" for the first six episodes and "Yumeiro Compass" (ユメイロコンパス, Dream-colored Compass) for episode seven onwards, all performed by Fourfolium. Funimation dubbed and released it on home video. Muse Communication licensed the series in Asia-Pacific and started streaming it on Muse Asia YouTube channel.

=== Video games ===
A visual novel developed by 5pb., titled New Game!: The Challenge Stage, was released for PlayStation 4 and PlayStation Vita in Japan on January 26, 2017. Characters from the series also appear alongside other Manga Time Kirara characters in the 2017 mobile role-playing game Kirara Fantasia.

== See also ==
- Idol × Idol Story!, another manga series by the same creator
