= List of We Never Learn episodes =

The anime television series We Never Learn is based on the manga series of the same name written and illustrated by Taishi Tsutsui. The adaptation was announced in the 39th issue of Weekly Shōnen Jump on August 27, 2018. The anime series was directed by Yoshiaki Iwasaki and written by Gō Zappa, featuring co-animation by Studio Silver and Arvo Animation and character designs by Masakatsu Sasaki. Masato Nakayama composed the music. The series aired from April 7 to June 30, 2019, on Tokyo MX, GTV, GYT, BS11, AT-X, MBS, and TV Aichi. (Note: Tokyo MX listed the series premiere at 24:30 on April 6, 2019, which is effectively April 7 at 12:30 a.m.) The opening theme is "Seishun Seminar" (セイシュンゼミナール) and the ending theme is "Never Give It Up!!"; both are performed by Haruka Shiraishi, Miyu Tomita, and Sayumi Suzushiro under the name Study. Aniplex of America licensed the series for distribution under the title We Never Learn: BOKUBEN, and streamed the series on Crunchyroll, Hulu, and FunimationNow. In Australia and New Zealand, AnimeLab streamed the series in the region.

After the first season's finale aired, a second season was announced, which aired from October 6 to December 29, 2019. (Note: Tokyo MX listed the season premiere at 24:30 on October 5, 2019, which is effectively October 6 at 12:30 a.m.) The second opening theme is "Can now, Can now", performed by Study, and the ending theme is "Hōkago no Liberty" (放課後のリバティ), performed by Halca. The second season ran for 13 episodes. An OVA episode was bundled with the manga's fourteenth volume, which was released on November 1, 2019. Another OVA episode was bundled with the manga's sixteenth volume, which was released on April 3, 2020.

== Episodes ==
=== Season 1 ===
No.	Title (Note: All English titles are taken from Aniplex of America.)	Original release date
1	"Genius and [X] Are Two Sides of the Same Coin"; Transliteration: "Tensai to [X] wa Hyōriittai de aru" (Japanese: 天才と［X］は表裏一体である)	April 7, 2019
Nariyuki Yuiga, a senior at Ichinose Academy, hopes to receive a VIP recommendation to enter university without an entrance exam or tuition fees. The headmaster offers Nariyuki the recommendation, but only if he agrees to tutor Fumino Furuhashi, a genius in literature and languages, and Rizu Ogata, a genius in mathematics. Nariyuki quickly realizes Fumino is useless at mathematics, while Rizu is useless at English and they have been abandoned by every tutor. He spends all night designing study materials for them. As they study together, Nariyuki becomes embarrassed when the two girls get so close to him. He learns Rizu's family own an udon restaurant. He then learns while walking home with Fumino that she wants to become an astronomer. He later sees Rizu in a park and learns that because she struggles to understand emotions, she is determined to study psychology. Nariyuki returns home to his mother, twin younger brother and sister, and his other younger sister, Mizuki, who has a brother complex and is furious that she can smell two girls' perfumes on him.
2	"A Fish Is to Water as a Genius Is to [X]"; Transliteration: "Uogokoro Areba, Tensai ni [X] Kokoro ari" (Japanese: 魚心あれば、天才に［X］心あり)	April 14, 2019
Uruka Takemoto, Nariyuki's middle school friend, is an outstanding swimmer with a recommendation for a sports scholarship. Unfortunately, she is failing most of her subjects. To ensure she earns the scholarship, the headmaster asks Nariyuki to tutor her. At first, Uruka refuses to study until she learns about Fumino and Rizu. Having had a secret crush on Nariyuki since middle school, she immediately joins their group. Rizu is given 24 hours to rewrite an essay about civilization, and asks for Nariyuki's help. Nariyuki's neighborhood experiences a blackout, causing Rizu to cling to Nariyuki due to her fear of the dark. Seeing this, Uruka pretends to be scared too. Nariyuki then builds an oil lamp so they can study until Uruka accidentally blows it out. Rizu manages to turn in an acceptable essay about civilizations forming around campfires. Uruka learns if she fails an English vocabulary test, she will be banned from the swimming club. When Uruka becomes distracted, Nariyuki decides to combine studying with swimming and she manages to score 100%. To thank him, Uruka gives Nariyuki a pencil case she bought him, only to realize she accidentally gave him her swimsuit.
3	"A Genius Resonates Emotionally with [X]"; Transliteration: "Tensai wa [X] ni mo Kokoro Tsūzuru Mono to Shiru" (Japanese: 天才は［X］にも心通ずるものと知る)	April 21, 2019
The headmaster orders Nariyuki to help Fumino and Rizu score average or higher on their midterms. Mafuyu Kirisu, the girls former tutor, advises the headmaster to remove Nariyuki as tutor if they fail. While studying at her parents restaurant, Rizu is relieved to learn Nariyuki plans to continue being their tutor. Rizu scores above average in Modern Japanese. Unfortunately, Fumino gets a cold the day before her mathematics exam so Uruka and Nariyuki help her. Fumino recovers and scores above average in mathematics so Nariyuki remains their tutor, though he ends up catching Fumino's cold. As Uruka still refuses to confess to Nariyuki, her girl friends take her shopping for pretty clothes. She later bumps into Nariyuki and becomes embarrassed when people assume they are a couple. Nariyuki spots a toy his youngest sister wants as first prize in a princess carrying competition, which they ultimately win. Afterwards, Uruka asks Nariyuki if her new clothes look nice, but she runs away before he can answer. Nariyuki gets in trouble with Mizuki when she finds out about the competition.
4	"What She Wants from a Genius Is [X]"; Transliteration: "Kanojo ga Tensai ni Nozomu Mono Sunawachi [X] de aru" (Japanese: 彼女が天才に望むもの即ち［X］である)	April 28, 2019
Fumino decides to go on a diet. Nariyuki notices she is too hungry to study and assures her she is thin but she forces him to feel her stomach. Nariyuki later sees Fumino buying snacks and learns she believes studying at night burns more calories, so she overeats after school. With the real cause of her weight gain identified, Fumino's weight returns to normal. Rizu is confronted by Sawako Sekijo, President of Science Club, who is convinced Rizu loves Nariyuki and began studying psychology because of him. Sawako asks Nariyuki embarrassing questions, but is convinced after Rizu shows no reaction. Nariyuki realizes Sawako wants to be Rizu's friend and hints that they study in the library. Uruka accidentally comes to school without her bra and is terrified of Nariyuki finding out. During a basketball game, she is so focused on hiding her breasts Nariyuki worries she is ill. She decides to act normally only to fall with her breasts in Nariyuki's face, though it turns out he is used to it as his sister Mizuki frequently goes braless at home. Mizuki later punishes him for noticing she is actually wearing a bra.
5	"A Genius in the Forest Is Strayed by [X]"; Transliteration: "Rinkan no tensai wa [X] ni meisō suru" (Japanese: 林間の天才は［X］に迷走する)	May 5, 2019
On a three-day mountain study camp, Fumino notices Rizu is staring at Nariyuki, so Rizu begins to avoid him. She becomes so flustered, she goes outside and ultimately becomes lost. Miserable, Rizu daydreams about Nariyuki coming to rescue her, only for Nariyuki to arrive after realizing she was missing. Embarrassed at being rescued, she falls and accidentally kiss him. Rizu tries to act like nothing happened even when their teacher forces them to clean the baths as punishment. The girls suddenly enter the area so Rizu tries to stop them. Nariyuki hides under a bench with Fumino, Rizu, and Uruka sitting above him. Fumino almost finds him but he is saved by Sawako, who figured out what happened, and tries to help him escape. Unfortunately, he bumps into Uruka and sees her completely naked, though Uruka is so shocked she convinces herself she is hallucinating. Rizu later apologizes for causing so much trouble and assures Nariyuki the kiss was an accident. Nariyuki gives a report of the girls' progress to Ms. Kirisu, who reveals she knows about the kiss.
6	"Thus, [X] Geniuses Never Learn"; Transliteration: "Tensai [X] tachi wa kakushite benkyō ga dekinai" (Japanese: 天才［X］たちはかくして勉強ができない)	May 12, 2019
When Kirisu questions whether Nariyuki is a suitable tutor, the girls rush to his defense. Nariyuki later spots Kirisu's injured hand and realizes she had been looking for Rizu in the mountain too, proving she secretly cares about the students. One of Nariyuki's friends finds out he kissed a girl, which Uruka overhears and becomes upset at hiding her feelings for so long. Uruka and Rizu's scores drop dramatically due to the rumor, causing Fumino to realize they both like Nariyuki. Uruka's swimming friends decide to help her seduce Nariyuki. Being completely dense, Nariyuki decides if Rizu and Uruka are in love he must stop getting in their way. Uruka alters her uniform to be more seductive while they walk together and end up at a shrine. Uruka pretends to fall asleep like her friends suggested to see how he reacts and becomes embarrassed when he starts licking her, only to realize it was stray cats. Uruka discovers Nariyuki is flustered due to her more exposed breasts, which makes her happy. Nariyuki later becomes confused when Uruka's test scores inexplicably improve again.
7	"A Former Tutor's Secret Spot is [X]"; Transliteration: "Zenninsha no hitoku ryōiki wa [X] na arisamadearu" (Japanese: 前任者の秘匿領域は［X］な有様である)	May 19, 2019
Fumino trips into Nariyuki's arms, angering Rizu, so Fumino tries to push Nariyuki into Rizu's arms, but accidentally pushes him into Rizu's breasts. Fumino later learns Rizu only looked angry due to wearing her old glasses and never actually saw what happened. While saving a cat from a tree, Nariyuki meets Kirisu, who catches the cat but sprains her ankle. He takes her home and discovers she is an untidy slob. When Kirisu decides to tutor Nariyuki, he insists on tidying up and finds her figure skating awards. Kirisu explains she was a genius skater but she had to give it up, which is why she wants the girls to use their talents since she was unable to use hers. After Nariyuki leaves, Kirisu reveals she was actually extremely flustered a man was in her room. When a rumor spreads Nariyuki is dating Fumino, Nariyuki becomes the target of Fumino's fan club who wants to make sure he is worthy. At first, they are disappointed at the lack of romance but eventually decide it is enough that Fumino trusts Nariyuki, and the dating rumor is abandoned, to Fumino's relief.
8	"Sometimes a Genius's Every Action Is at the Mercy of [X]"; Transliteration: "Tensai no ichi kyoshu ichi tōsoku wa toki ni [X] o honrō suru" (Japanese: 天才の一挙手一投足は時に［X］を翻弄する)	May 26, 2019
Nariyuki's mother wins a smartphone; unfortunately, Nariyuki is bad at using it. Uruka finds a website suggesting studying in the bath is more effective. That night, Nariyuki does study in the bath. He accidentally texts Fumino in her bath, who becomes embarrassed at the thought of communicating while naked. He then accidentally calls Rizu who almost drowns after imagining what it would be like to bathe together. Finally, he and Uruka become embarrassed when they realize they are having a video call and they see each other naked. The next day at school, an exhausted Uruka collapses. While waiting for the school nurse, Uruka, half asleep, snuggles up close to Nariyuki just as the swim team arrives, causing Nariyuki to panic and hide under the bed. While hiding, Nariyuki hears them talking about Uruka being in love with him, causing him to become flustered around her. Uruka takes him to a ramen shop and asks him if he likes anyone, but he claims he will not be thinking about relationships until after final exams. In turn, Nariyuki asks if she likes him, but she denies it.
9	"He Struggles with [X] in a Forbidden Zone"; Transliteration: "Kindan no chi nite kare wa, [X] ga tame funtō suru" (Japanese: 禁断の地にて彼は、［X］が為奮闘する)	June 2, 2019
Nariyuki sees a scared Kirisu outside due to a cockroach. Nariyuki tries to kill it but Kirisu clings to him, allowing it to escape. Kirisu insists he stay and tutors him all day, then orders food from Rizu's restaurant, not knowing Rizu works there, and Rizu delivers it. Nariyuki asks to play one of Rizu's card games, but this makes it worse as Rizu loses repeatedly. Nariyuki tries to tell Rizu someone does care for her, but Rizu misinterprets this, not knowing he means Kirisu. When the cockroach reappears, Rizu kills it. Nariyuki's mother becomes sick so he decides to volunteer at her job, not knowing she works at a lingerie store. The manager dresses him as the mascot before she leaves. To Nariyuki's horror, Uruka and Rizu visit the shop where they ask that Rizu be measured for a new bra. After they leave, Nariyuki is faced with Kirisu stuck in a bra, which he unhooks. Fumino then visits the store to find bras for her much smaller breasts. Once Nariyuki is finally freed from the suit by the manager, Fumino becomes catatonic from shock.
10	"A Lost Lamb in New Territory Encounters [X]"; Transliteration: "Kano shin tenchi ni mayoe ru kohitsuji wa x to kaikō suru" (Japanese: かの新天地に迷える子羊は［X］と邂逅する)	June 9, 2019
Nariyuki attends cram school and meets Asumi Kominami, whom he erroneously assumes is in middle school. When Nariyuki becomes lost, he is grabbed by two suspicious men and guided to a maid café called High Stage where Kominami works. Nariyuki sees her study material and realizes she is terrible at science. The other maids bribe Nariyuki with free drinks. Afterwards, Nariyuki bumps into a doctor just as Kominami brings him the train pass he forgot, and discovers the doctor is her father. Wanting to hide her job, Kominami claims Nariyuki is her boyfriend. When her father tells her to give up on medical school, Nariyuki promises to tutor her, which her father surprisingly accepts. A few days later, Nariyuki is tutoring the girls at a restaurant and they meet Kominami. The very next day, all three of them begin attending cram school. After getting caught in the rain, Kominami invites them to her home where Fumino learns about Nariyuki pretending to be her boyfriend. Kominami quickly grasps that Fumino has her own feelings for Nariyuki. When Kominami asks Nariyuki which girl he likes, he realizes he had given it much thought. Kominami decides to continue teasing him flirtatiously.
11	"An Illustrious Veteran Sometimes Serves [X]"; Transliteration: "Igen aru zennin-sha wa toki ni [X] ni kashizuku" (Japanese: 威厳ある前任者は時に［X］にかしづく)	June 16, 2019
Kirisu spots Nariyuki at High Stage and reveals that Kominami used to be one of her students. When Kirisu accidentally injures another waitress, she temporarily fills in. Kirisu then accidentally gets drunk after taking a sip of alcohol, requiring Nariyuki to carry her home. Kirisu has to go to work on a weekend, but with no clean clothes is forced to wear her old school uniform. She is stopped by a police officer for driving while looking underage, only for a passing Nariyuki to save her. Kirisu drives Nariyuki to school so he can return library books while she retrieves paperwork. Unfortunately, Kirisu's car runs out of gas, forcing them to walk home. Kirisu reminisces about missing out on a social life due to her skating, so Nariyuki buys her ice cream. However, when Fumino and Rizu appear, they are forced to hide in some bushes. Out of desperation, Nariyuki pretends they are a kissing couple, causing the two girls to flee in embarrassment. They finally make it to Kirisu's apartment, only to be spotted by Kominami.
12	"Sometimes a Genius Travels Down Memory Lane with [X]"; Transliteration: "Tensai wa toki ni [X] o tomo ni wakachi tsuikai suru" (Japanese: 天才は時に［X］をともに分かち追懐する)	June 23, 2019
Nariyuki and Uruka separately ask for Fumino's advice concerning their issues with each other. They later meet up but struggle to talk, both texting Fumino for help. Fumino tries to give good advice but Nariyuki and Uruka are constantly reminded of all their embarrassing moments. Due to texting Sawako as well, Fumino accidentally tells Nariyuki to complement Uruka's hair, which ends up working. During their next swimming competition, Uruka's team is disqualified after her teammate, Ikeda, makes a mistake. Nariyuki is impressed that Uruka comforted Ikeda. Uruka asks Nariyuki to go with her at night to their old middle school where she reminisces about first falling in love with Nariyuki. She reminds him she once considered quitting swimming until he convinced her to continue, though Nariyuki has forgotten this. Nariyuki asks if she has confessed to the boy she likes, which she has not, so he insists on practicing. Uruka decides to actually confess. Unfortunately, a dense Nariyuki thinks she is still practicing. She pushes him in the pool and gets him to agree to call her by her first name.
13	"The Light in a Genius's Eye Is All [X]"; Transliteration: "Tensai no me ni ten no hikari wa subete [X] de aru" (Japanese: 天才の目に天の光はすべて［X］である)	June 30, 2019
Rizu invites Fumino, Uruka and Sawako to a sleepover study group where, without Nariyuki, the girls end up asking Sawako for help. Nariyuki takes his mother and youngest siblings to a festival where he sees Fumino and Uruka. Nariyuki's mother tells him to attend the festival with his friends, so Fumino goes off on her own, leaving Nariyuki with Uruka. They come across a food stall run by Rizu and her father. While Nariyuki helps Rizu deliver the food, he spots Kirisu, who accidentally hurts herself, requiring him to carry her to the medical tent run by Kominami and her father. Kominami has an embarrassed Nariyuki treat Kirisu himself. Later, both Fumino and Nariyuki miss the last train home. They decide to stay at an inn, with Fumino claiming they are siblings to deceive the manager. To distract themselves, they end up stargazing. Nariyuki thinks it is admirable for Fumino to have a dream, whereas he has no idea what his dream is. Fumino assures him she will be there to support him when he figures it out. The next morning, they embarrassingly make their way home, having woken up in each other's arms.

=== Season 2 ===
No.	Title (Note: All English titles are taken from Aniplex of America.)	Original release date
1	"He and a Genius Each Consider a Decision Pertaining to [X]"; Transliteration: "Tensai to kare wa sono [X] naru hantei ni meimei omonbakaru" (Japanese: 天才と彼はその［x］なる判定に銘々慮る)	October 6, 2019
Rizu scores E on a practice exam and tells the girls, who assume she is talking about breast size. Kominami claims all men love large breasts. Nariyuki asks about the E and Rizu panics, thinking he is asking about breasts. She tells him her breasts are actually G cup and Nariyuki, thinking she means her grade, panics as G does not exist. Once the misunderstanding is finally cleared up, Rizu is determined to improve. Rizu and Uruka hear Fumino accidentally call Nariyuki by his first name, having done so during their stay at the inn. Uruka refuses to respond until Nariyuki calls her by her first name so everyone decides to use each other's first names. Later, due to mixed-up bath signs, Nariyuki and the girls end up in the men's baths. Nariyuki's male classmates arrive, forcing the girls to hide underwater. In the end, they escape when the classmates try peeking into the girls' baths, only to be punished by Kominami. The girls thank Nariyuki for helping them escape, only for Nariyuki to upset Fumino by revealing she left her bra behind.
2	"At Times, an Elder's Pride Is in Direct Opposition to [X]'s Circumstances"; Transliteration: "Toki ni wa, chōrō no hokori wa [X] no jōkyō ni chokusetsuhantai" (Japanese: 時には、長老の誇りは［x］の状況に直接反対)	October 13, 2019
High Stage begins sending maids to customers as housekeepers and pays Nariyuki to watch Kominami while she works. Kominami's first customer turns out to be Kirisu, who is so embarrassed she drags Nariyuki inside. Next up is Uruka's mother, who hired High Stage to clean and cook due to her illness. Uruka becomes so flustered seeing Nariyuki she does all the work herself. Their final customer is Fumino, who destroyed her kitchen trying to cook. Not wanting Nariyuki to see this, she orders food from Rizu's restaurant. Having done no work all day, Kominami insists on cleaning Nariyuki's house. Fumino accidentally falls asleep in Kirisu's class, earning her wrath. Kirisu later stays up all night working, which leads to her falling asleep in class the next day. Nariyuki ends up helping by sneezing loudly to keep her awake. After going home, Kirisu realizes she lost her door key, requiring a passing Nariyuki's help in finding it. However, she discovers hours later it was in her handbag the whole time. Once inside, she falls asleep in the hall, causing an embarrassed Nariyuki to put her to bed himself.
3	"With the Changing Seasons, a Genius Experiences the Sorrow of [X]"; Transliteration: "Tensai wa hensen suru kisetsu to [X] moyō ni ureu" (Japanese: 天才は変遷する季節と［x］模様に憂う)	October 20, 2019
Due to her father barging into the bathroom, Rizu accidentally cuts off her bangs, which she decides to hide from Nariyuki under an unusual mask. Fumino pulls the mask off, though Nariyuki does not notice anything different. Rizu becomes confused as to why Nariyuki not noticing upsets her. Rizu later agrees to go shopping with Sawako for a pencil case, though Sawako sneakily takes her to popular date spots until she spots Nariyuki and reluctantly tells Rizu to go shopping with him. Sawako reminisces about middle school, where her classmates were jealous of her perfect test scores until she met Rizu, who did not care what her classmates thought. Sawako decided to go to the same high school as Rizu but failed to talk to her until their third year. Nariyuki confronts Sawako as he knows she was looking forward to spending the day with Rizu, and she ends up admitting how much she admires Rizu, which Rizu hears. Rizu admits hearing Sawako's praise makes her happy. She then asks her to continue helping her shop for a pencil case. Sawako is so happy she trips into Rizu's breasts, exposing her own panties to Nariyuki.
4	"Sometimes a Genius Struggles with a Limited [X]"; Transliteration: "Toki ni Tensai wa Gentei Sareta [X] ni Oite Funtou suru" (Japanese: 時に天才は限定された［x］において奮闘する)	October 27, 2019
Rizu decides to visit a salon owned by the eccentric Ms. Karasuma, who gives her a complete makeover. Because Nariyuki does not recognize her when she sits next to him, he thinks she is a stranger trying to flirt with him. When Rizu eventually invites Nariyuki to her house, he agrees with the intent of lecturing her parents about their daughter inviting boys over. Once he arrives there, he finally realizes she is Rizu after meeting her angry father again. Despite learning vocabulary and grammar, Uruka has no confidence in speaking English so Nariyuki decides they must speak English all day. While playing with a lost puppy, Nariyuki sees Uruka's panties, forcing him to defend his honor in English. Two English speaking men later invite Uruka to a barbeque. When Nariyuki protests, they ask how he knows Uruka. His mispronounced response makes it sound like Uruka is his girlfriend. Because of this, she flees in embarrassment.
OVA1	"The Predecessor [X] with Elegance with the Missing Item on the Beach"; Transliteration: "Nagisa ni use mo no aride senjin wa enzen to [x] suru" (Japanese: 渚に失せものありで先人は艶然と [x] する)	November 1, 2019
Kominami and Nariyuki arrive at the beach to take fake romantic pictures for her father. The ocean washes away her bikini top, so Nariyuki gives her his shirt. When they find two tops, Nariyuki decides to place the second one in lost and found, but it is stolen by a dolphin. After Kominami leaves, Nariyuki tries to get changed but realizes Kominami still has his shirt. He suddenly finds Kirisu hiding topless, as the second lost top was hers. Nariyuki tries to lead her to safety but she slips, pressing her breasts against him and breaks his glasses. Nariyuki buys a new bikini, but the only type available is a school swimsuit. Nariyuki is spotted by the other teachers visiting the beach, forcing Kirisu to hide. While hiding, Kirisu admits she finds relying on others difficult. Nariyuki points out she relies on him frequently, and she actually smiles, though Nariyuki decides he imagined it. Once Kirisu manages to change into her normal clothes, she drives Nariyuki home. Meanwhile, Fumino, Uruka, Rizu and Sawako all study together in bikinis for fun since they missed out on visiting the beach.
5	"A Heartfelt Gift Sometimes Becomes a Complicated [X]"; Transliteration: "Kokorodzukushi no Tamamono wa Toki ni [X] no Sakusō to naru" (Japanese: 心尽くしの賜物は時に［x］の錯綜となる)	November 3, 2019
Nariyuki gives Fumino a bra as a birthday present, which confuses her. It is then revealed Nariyuki accidentally gave her Mizuki's new bra instead of a special pen. The next day at school, Uruka gives Fumino oven gloves while Rizu gives new chopsticks. During a hurried discussion, Nariyuki and Fumino realize their mistake and Nariyuki desperately apologies, though his statement about breast size causes Fumino's heart to skip a beat. Nariyuki's mother asks him to help her manager at her new store. It turns out to be a massage parlour with Nariyuki as store mascot, but history repeats itself when the manager leaves once again. To his horror, his first client is Kirisu. The other staff member realizes he is a natural masseur after Kirisu moans happily. His next clients turn out to be Rizu and Fumino, who he massages into total bliss. Kominami arrives next for a foot massage, but she enjoys it so much she knocks his mascot head off in ecstasy. Uruka arrives in time to see Nariyuki get carried away. To keep his secret, Uruka asks for a massage too.
6	"Wherefore Might They Fathom the Aspirations of the Immediate [X]"; Transliteration: "Karera wa Izukunzo mensuru [X] no Kokorozashi o Shiran ya" (Japanese: 彼らは安んぞ面する［x］の志を知らんや)	November 10, 2019
Kirisu visits a public bath, only to meet Kominami, Nariyuki and his twin siblings, Kazuki and Hazuki, who steal Kirisu's underwear. When Hazuki asks Kirisu to marry Nariyuki, Kirisu initially death-stares at him, but she then agrees in order to stop Hazuki's crying. However, when Hazuki runs to tell Nariyuki, Kirisu slips and knocks herself out. The manager asks Nariyuki to carry Kirisu, but Kirisu wakes up in Nariyuki's arms and scolds him for lechery. A crying Hazuki pulls Kirisu's towel off, exposing her nakedness to Nariyuki. Kominami eventually explains the whole situation to Kirisu, who apologizes. Kirisu reveals to Kominami she is commando under her suit, causing Nariyuki to realize his siblings still have Kirisu's underwear. Rizu and Fumino begin mock interviews to prepare for university interviews, not realizing the practice teacher is Kirisu, who mercilessly crushes their weak arguments. During Nariyuki's interview, he tries to overcome his nerves by remembering all the times Kirisu was not scary, but ends up imagining her in sexy outfits. Despite his embarrassment, he manages to answer her questions. After he leaves, Kirisu regrets having to be so merciless. Fumino and Rizu later begin aggressively studying interview techniques.
7	"A Genius Secretly Responds with [X] to Their Conjectures"; Transliteration: "Hitoshirezu Tensai wa Karera no Sontaku ni [X] suru" (Japanese: 人知れず天才は彼らの忖度に［x］する)	November 17, 2019
Rizu agrees to visit a university open day with Nariyuki and Sawako. Both Nariyuki and Sawako claim to be sick so Rizu can be with the other person. Nariyuki leaves Rizu with Sawako in a mathematics lecture. Afterwards, Nariyuki finds the professor praising Rizu's intellect. Sawako leaves Nariyuki with Rizu in the psychology lecture. Rizu becomes drunk from smelling alcohol fumes from a party and cries that Nariyuki and Sawako kept leaving her alone and they apologize. Rizu and Nariyuki later meet Kominami and learn High Stage is holding a board game competition to win free meals. As Rizu loves board games, she becomes a maid so she can play all the rare games. However, Rizu loses so many games she costs High Stage a fortune. Kominami and Nariyuki end up stepping in to help and Rizu scores her very first win, boosting her confidence. Unfortunately, she overhears Nariyuki and Kominami discussing the cheating strategy they used. Despite this, she remains determined to study psychology so she can understand Nariyuki's feelings, but she accidentally calls him "Master", as if she were still a maid, embarrassing Nariyuki in public.
8	"The Flow of [X] Never Ends..."; Transliteration: "Yuku [X] no Nagare wa taezu shite..." (Japanese: ゆく［x］の流れは絶えずして...)	November 24, 2019
Nariyuki learns he is at risk of failing physical education and agrees to extra swimming lessons. The swim coach has to leave so Kirisu is asked to teach swimming. Uruka tries to help but all Nariyuki can do is sink so Kirisu gets in the pool. In the showers, when Uruka admits she is nervous about losing her next competition, Kirisu gives her some advice. Thanks to said advice, Uruka easily wins the tournament so the headmaster offers her a chance to study abroad at an Australian university. Uruka asks Fumino if long distance relationships can work. Nariyuki arrives so Uruka hides under the table while he talks to Fumino about why Uruka is avoiding him and suspects she has a boyfriend. Fumino asks how he would feel if she did and he admits he would miss her but would support her regardless. Uruka feels happy hearing this but Fumino decides to tell Nariyuki he needs to figure out Uruka's behavior. Uruka ultimately decides that while she would like to study abroad, she wants to keep this secret from Nariyuki. Realizing she would need to speak fluent English, she asks Nariyuki to tutor her even more.
9	"The Star of Ultimate Love and the Name of [X] (Part 1)"; Transliteration: "Saiai no Hoshi ni [X] no Na wo (Zenpen)" (Japanese: 最愛の星に［x］の名を（前編）)	December 1, 2019
The school holds its parent-teacher conference. Fumino leaves her father an invitation but he does not attend. The university professor appears and begs Rizu to attend his mathematics course. Fumino then reveals the professor is actually her father, Reiji, with whom she has a strained relationship. When they have a heated conversation, Nariyuki panics and offers to let her stay with him. That night, Fumino remembers that her mother was a mathematics genius. After she died, Fumino tried to do math just like her, but her father became upset and slapped her. The next day, Uruka notices Fumino has the same underwear from the previous day, so Fumino has Nariyuki help her fetch clothes from her house, only for Reiji to arrive home early. They hide in a very cramped cupboard, waiting for him to leave, and Fumino discovers her mother's laptop Reiji hid after she died. They find it has only one folder, though it is password-protected, meaning Reiji has not read it either. She decides to figure out the password and live a life separate from her father.
10	"The Star of Ultimate Love and the Name of [X] (Part 2)"; Transliteration: "Saiai no Hoshi ni [X] no Na wo (Kōhen)" (Japanese: 最愛の星に［x］の名を（後編）)	December 8, 2019
When Nariyuki asks about her father, Fumino claims trying to fix their relationship is pointless. Nariyuki invites her to the top of the mountain where the stars are extra visible. After he hears her talk so passionately about stars, he advises she share that passion with her father. When her father remains stubbornly opposed to astronomy, Fumino decides to show him the truth on her mother's laptop. The file does not contain a thesis. Instead, it contains a video recording her mother made revealing she was never a mathematical genius. Therefore, she gave Fumino permission to do whatever made her happy. Fumino leaves Reiji with the laptop where the last recording is a young Fumino claiming that if she found a new star, she would name it after her father. Fumino remembers her mother telling her she was happy she married Reiji and hoped Fumino would find someone who supported her as well. Reiji finally gives Fumino permission to pursue astronomy, while Nariyuki reveals his mother had secretly met with Reiji to give him the courage to reconcile with Fumino. Having reconciled, Reiji decides to confront a terrified Nariyuki on his relationship with Fumino.
11	"[X] Descends Like Wildfire at the Festival's Beginning"; Transliteration: "Matsuri no Hajime wa yatsugibaya karera ni [X] ga furikakaru" (Japanese: 祭のはじめは矢継ぎ早 彼らに［x］が降りかかる)	December 15, 2019
When Uruka asks Nariyuki what he is going to do at college, he realizes he has been too occupied with his studies. The school prepares for a festival which, rumor has it, is jinxed so that any two people in physical contact during the fireworks will end up together. Kirisu decides her part of the festival will be a lecture on the Roman Empire. To make it more exciting, the other teachers decide to put her in costume. Meanwhile, Fumino is manipulated into playing Sleeping Beauty in her class play. Nariyuki later asks Kirisu for another mock interview so he can decide his subject. Rizu's father goes overboard and makes 1,000 servings of udon, so Nariyuki helps her sell as many as possible. Nariyuki discovers Uruka and the swim team are performing an idol show, only Uruka's costume was delivered to the wrong room. After Nariyuki finds Kirisu wearing the costume, he attempts to return it to Uruka. However, the zipper becomes stuck. Fumino marches round the festival furious no one will tell her who is playing her prince. Kirisu ends up on stage as an idol instead of Uruka.
12	"[X] Treads a Thorny Path as the Festivities Continue..."; Transliteration: "Matsuri no Sawagi wa tomarazu [X] domo wa ibara no Michi wo yuku" (Japanese: 祭の騒ぎは留まらず［x］どもは茨の道を往く)	December 22, 2019
Kirisu has a flawless performance after she memorized Uruka's dance. Uruka then performs as well in a costume Nariyuki managed to create from memory. After the show, everyone celebrates until Nariyuki foolishly pulls a loose thread on Kirisu's already damaged costume. Afterwards, the Thorn Society promise Nariyuki they will help sell Rizu's udon if he helps them with their play, so Nariyuki mistakenly puts on the cat costume Kirisu was actually supposed to wear, causing the teachers to chase him. With Nariyuki missing, the Thorn Society begin searching for him. Kominami sees Fumino being led to the stage, realizes Nariyuki is in the costume and what is going on, so she shows Nariyuki a shortcut. With Nariyuki absent, the headmaster announces the play will be entirely improvised and asks for a volunteer prince from the audience. All the boys rush the stage to volunteer, forcing the Thorn Society to protect Fumino in a mad brawl. Nariyuki makes it just as part of the stage starts to topple and he manages to save Fumino from injury. He is immediately declared the prince, and to his surprise Fumino kisses his mask on the lips.
13	"A Post-Festival Celebration of [X], Both Dazzling And Lonely"; Transliteration: "Matsuri no Owari wa sabishiku mo hanayaka ni [X] domo wo shukufuku suru" (Japanese: 祭の終わりは寂しくも華やかに［x］どもを祝福する)	December 29, 2019
After Nariyuki flees the stage and gets changed, the Thorn Society angrily believed another boy kissed Fumino. Meanwhile, Fumino believes it was Kominami in the costume, but Kominami denies this. Nariyuki is finally to sell the rest of the udon after Rizu makes a causal comment. As night falls, the time for the jinx arrives. Fumino, Uruka, Rizu, Nariyuki, Kirisu, and Kominami are pushed into each other in a six-person pile up. When the fireworks fail to ignite, Nariyuki is helped to his feet by a girl just as it finally does so, completing the jinx. However, he has no idea who it is. Sometime later, Nariyuki passes his second mock interview, revealing his plans to become a teacher. Uruka is accepted to the Australian university on a sports scholarship. Fumino passes mathematics and begins studying astronomy, while Rizu passes English and begins studying psychology. Kominami is accepted into medical school. Nariyuki almost misses saying goodbye to Uruka at the airport until he is driven there by Kirisu. He ends up tripping and is helped to his feet by Uruka, suggesting it was Uruka he was jinxed to end up with.
OVA2	"Church Bells Blessing [X]"; Transliteration: "Chaperu no Kane wa [X] o shukufuku suru" (Japanese: チャペルの鐘は[X]を祝福する)	April 3, 2020
At the family restaurant, Nariyuki helps the girls with their subjects. Chiyoko soon arrives at the scene, and she announces that she no longer runs the massage parlor and now is in the wedding planner business. Chiyoko invites them all to the bridal fair she is holding. The following day, Chiyoko gives a tour of the renovated church where the first wedding that she planned will be held to the study group. They then run into Kirisu, who is wearing a wedding dress for a photo op, which the study group also participates in. Mizuki later sees all of the pictures in Nariyuki's phone and has a nervous breakdown because of it.
