= List of Mao chapters =

The chapters of the Japanese manga series Mao are written and illustrated by Rumiko Takahashi. The series started in Shogakukan's Weekly Shōnen Sunday on May 8, 2019. Shogakukan has collected the manga chapters into individual tankōbon volumes. The first volume was published on September 18, 2019. As of October 2026, 31 volumes have been released.

In February 2021, Viz Media announced that they licensed the series for English release in North America and the first volume was published on September 14, 2021. On May 9, 2023, Viz Media launched their Viz Manga digital manga service, with the series' chapters receiving simultaneous English publication in North America as they are released in Japan.

== Volumes ==
No.	Original release date	Original ISBN	English release date	English ISBN
1	September 18, 2019	978-4-09-129310-7	September 14, 2021	978-1-9747-2052-1
1. "Nanoka" (菜花); 2. "Mao" (摩緒); 3. "The Other Side of the Gate" (門(ゲート)の向こう, Gēto no Mukō); 4. "The Faceless Viscount" (顔のない子爵, Kao no Nai Shishaku); 5. "Spider Lady" (蜘蛛女, Kumo Onna); 6. "The Accursed" (呪われた者, Norowareta Mono); 7. "The Sinkhole" (陥没事故, Kanbotsu Jiko); 8. "Power Over Life and Death" (寿命を操る, Jumyō o Ayatsuru)
2	November 18, 2019	978-4-09-129446-3	November 9, 2021	978-1-9747-2058-3
9. "The Origins of the Ogre God" (鬼神の出処, Kijin no Dedokoro); 10. "The Other Face of the Cult" (教団の裏側, Kyōdan no Uragawa); 11. "The Curse Returns" (呪い返し, Noroigaeshi); 12. "Priestess Shoko's Prophecy" (鐘呼さまの予言, Shōko-sama no Yogen); 13. "The Keystone" (要石, Kanameishi); 14. "Guardian of the Barrier" (結界の守人, Kekkai no Moribito); 15. "Bait" (囮, Otori); 16. "Maw of Water" (水の顎, Mizu no Agito); 17. "Memories of that Day" (あの日の記憶, Ano Hi no Kioku); 18. "The Beginning" (始まり, Hajimari)
3	January 17, 2020	978-4-09-129547-7	January 11, 2022	978-1-9747-2082-8
19. "Byoki" (猫鬼, Byōki); 20. "Seven Tails" (七又の尾, Nanamata no O); 21. "The New Vessel" (新しい器, Atarashii Utsuwa); 22. "The Shikigami" (守護の式神, Shugo no Shikigami); 23. "Uozumi" (魚住さん, Uozumi-san); 24. "Asakusa Tower" (凌雲閣, Ryōunkaku); 25. "Hyakka the Senior Apprentice" (兄弟子 百火, Anideshi Hyakka); 26. "Sword of Ill Omen" (不吉の太刀, Fukitsu no Tachi); 27. "Haimaru" (灰丸); 28. "Kuchinawa" (朽縄)
4	May 18, 2020	978-4-09-850078-9	March 8, 2022	978-1-9747-2353-9
29. "The Name of the Man" (男の名は, Otoko no Na wa); 30. "The Shikigami from the West" (西から来た式神, Nishi kara Kita Shikigami); 31. "Dirt and the Katashiro" (土と形代, Tsuchi to Katashiro); 32. "The Shikigami's Master" (式神の主, Shikigami no Aruji); 33. "Mokuzu" (藻久不); 34. "The Kodoku Pit" (蠱毒の穴, Kodoku no Ana); 35. "Taizanfukun" (泰山府君); 36. "Visitor in the Rain" (雨の訪問者, Ame no Hōmonsha); 37. "Pot of Kodoku" (蠱毒の壺, Kodoku no Tsubo); 38. "Mixing of Blood" (血の交わり, Chi no Majiwari)
5	August 18, 2020	978-4-09-850174-8	May 10, 2022	978-1-9747-2452-9
39. "Masago" (真砂); 40. "Shiranui" (不知火); 41. "Warning" (警告, Keikoku); 42. "Three-Way Conversation" (鼎談, Teidan); 43. "The Donor" (与える者, Ataerumono); 44. "Missed Connection" (すれ違い, Surechigai); 45. "The Iron Mask" (鉄仮面, Tekkamen); 46. "Yurako" (幽羅子); 47. "Sana's End" (沙那の最期, Sana no Saigo); 48. "The Metal Shikigami" (金の式神, Kin no Shikigami)
6	October 16, 2020	978-4-09-850266-0	July 12, 2022	978-1-9747-2453-6
49. "White Bone Cave" (白骨洞, Byakkotsudō); 50. "Shiranui's Legs" (不知火の足, Shiranui no Ashi); 51. "Nanoka's Suspicions" (菜花の疑念, Nanoka no Ginen); 52. "House of Curses" (呪いの家, Noroi no Ie); 53. "Under the Mask" (仮面の下, Kamen no Shita); 54. "Hakubi" (白眉); 55. "A Woman of the Goko Clan" (御降家の女, Gokō-ke no Onna); 56. "Beyond the Five Elements" (相剋の外, Sōkoku no Soto); 57. "He Won't Wake Up" (覚めない, Samenai); 58. "Maogui" (マオグイ)
7	January 18, 2021	978-4-09-850385-8	September 13, 2022	978-1-9747-3004-9
59. "Home for Foundlings" (捨童子の家, Sutedōji no Ie); 60. "Earth Medicine" (土薬, Tsuchigusuri); 61. "Natsuno" (夏野); 62. "Daigo's Death" (大五の死, Daigo no Shi); 63. "The Seance" (魂おろし, Tama Oroshi); 64. "The Undersea Shrine" (海底の社, Kaitei no Yashiro); 65. "Bound to the Wheel of Fate" (五色堂の輪, Goshikidō no Wa); 66. "Within the Evil Aura" (邪気の中, Jaki no Naka); 67. "Protection" (加護, Kago); 68. "The Undying Corpse" (朽ちない亡骸, Kuchinai Nakigara)
8	March 17, 2021	978-4-09-850395-7	November 8, 2022	978-1-9747-3005-6
69. "Sana's Heart" (紗那の心臓, Sana no Shinzō); 70. "Exorcism" (憑きもの落とし, Tsukimono Otoshi); 71. "Phantom Slasher" (通り魔, Tōrima); 72. "Beast" (獣, Kemono); 73. "The Kagami Treasure" (加神家の家宝, Kagami-ke no Kahō); 74. "Soma's Desire" (双馬の望み, Sōma no Nozomi); 75. "Puppet Needle" (傀儡の針, Kugutsu no Hari); 76. "Strike the Beast" (獣を斬る, Kemono o Kiru); 77. "Risk My Life" (捨て身, Sutemi); 78. "The Sleepwalking Patient" (夜歩く患者, Yoru-Aruku Kanja)
9	July 16, 2021	978-4-09-850531-9	January 10, 2023	978-1-9747-3006-3
79. "Every Hundred Years" (百年目, Hyakunenme); 80. "Hidenin" (悲田院, Hiden'in); 81. "Pact" (契約, Keiyaku); 82. "Traveling Performers" (村芝居の一座, Murashibai no Ichiza); 83. "Right Hand" (右手, Migite); 84. "The Curse Game" (呪い遊び, Noroi Asobi); 85. "Kagari" (かがり); 86. "Mark of the Needle" (針の跡, Hari no Ato); 87. "Ghouls and Rakshasas" (幽鬼と羅刹, Yūki to Rasetsu); 88. "Yurako's World" (幽羅子の世界, Yurako no Sekai)
10	October 18, 2021	978-4-09-850723-8	March 14, 2023	978-1-9747-3402-3
89. "Kindness" (いたわり, Itawari); 90. "Words Can Curse" (言葉は呪い, Kotoba wa Noroi); 91. "Kakachu" (苛火虫, Kakachū); 92. "Renji" (蓮次); 93. "Life or Death" (生死の選択, Seishi no Sentaku); 94. "The Garden of Longevity" (延命の庭, Enmei no Niwa); 95. "Ambition" (野望, Yabō); 96. "Hakubi's Thoughts" (白眉の胸中, Hakubi no Kyōchū); 97. "Otori Family Matters" (鳳家の事情, Ōtori-ke no Jijō); 98. "The First Victim" (最初の被害者, Saisho no Higaisha)
11	January 18, 2022	978-4-09-850867-9	May 9, 2023	978-1-9747-3645-4
99. "Sword of Protection" (護り刀, Mamorigatana); 100. "Transfer of the Curse" (呪い移し, Noroi Utsushi); 101. "Meimeido" (冥命堂, Meimeidō); 102. "Soma's Mission" (双馬の使命, Sōma no Shimei); 103. "Ready to Slay" (殺す覚悟, Korosu Kakugo); 104. "Akanemaru" (地血丸); 105. "The Master of the Sword" (刀の主, Katana no Aruji); 106. "Bargain with a Devil" (駆け引き, Kakehiki); 107. "Mao's Panic" (摩緒の焦り, Mao no Aseri); 108. "The Philanthropists" (慈善家夫婦, Jizenka Fūfu)
12	March 17, 2022	978-4-09-851008-5	July 11, 2023	978-1-9747-3646-1
109. "The Chinese Lute" (月琴, Gekkin); 110. "Human Kodoku" (人間の蠱毒, Ningen no Kodoku); 111. "Gigantic Cursed Tool" (巨大な呪具, Kyodai na Jugu); 112. "Weakness" (弱点, Jakuten); 113. "The Hand in the Bag" (鞄の手, Kaban no Te); 114. "The Pharmacy in the Western-Style Building" (西洋館の薬局, Seiyō-kan no Yakkyoku); 115. "Workplace" (作業場, Sagyōba); 116. "Bloody Strike" (血の一撃, Chi no Ichigeki); 117. "The Ceramic Bell" (土鈴, Dorei); 118. "Under the Floorboards" (床下, Yukashita)
13	June 17, 2022	978-4-09-851151-8	September 12, 2023	978-1-9747-4046-8
119. "Empty Husk" (抜け殻, Nukegara); 120. "Fiery Glare" (睨み火, Niramibi); 121. "The Real Thing" (本物, Honmono); 122. "Sphere of Blue Light" (青い光の玉, Aoi Hikari no Tama); 123. "Bringer of Rain" (雨乞い, Amagoi); 124. "The Parasite" (乗っ取り屋, Nottoriya); 125. "Seed of Haku" (魄の種, Haku no Tane); 126. "Mitazono Village" (御手園村, Mitazono Mura); 127. "Mei's Choice" (芽生の決意, Mei no Ketsui); 128. "The Curse of the Abandoned Home" (廃屋の祟り, Haioku no Tatari)
14	October 12, 2022	978-4-09-851262-1	November 14, 2023	978-1-9747-4125-0
129. "The Evil Aura of the Well" (井戸の邪気, Ido no Jaki); 130. "Tatarigami" (祟り神); 131. "The Earth's Chi" (地の気, Chi no Ki); 132. "Blunt Words" (まっすぐな言葉, Massugu na Kotoba); 133. "Daughters of the House of Deadly Curses" (呪い屋の姉妹, Noroi-ya no Shimai); 134. "Needle and Sword" (針と刀, Hari to Katana); 135. "Strengths and Weaknesses" (力の差, Chikara no Sa); 136. "The Plight of the Elder Sister" (姉の立場, Ane no Tachiba); 137. "Mask of Judgement" (裁きの面, Sabaki no Men); 138. "Threat of Fire" (火脅, Hi Odoshi)
15	January 18, 2023	978-4-09-851534-9	January 9, 2024	978-1-9747-4293-6
139. "Sasuga" (流石); 140. "The Destruction of the Mask" (面の始末, Men no Shimatsu); 141. "Strange Events at the Lair" (隠れ家の異変, Kakurega no Ihen); 142. "True Face" (本当の顔, Hontō no Kao); 143. "Twin Roles" (双児の役割, Futago no Yakuwari); 144. "Shaman" (配剤師, Haizaishi); 145. "A Gift from Heaven" (天からの授かりもの, Ten kara no Sazukarimono); 146. "Your Life Is in My Hands" (生死を握る, Seishi o Nigiru); 147. "Shape-Shifting Cat" (化け猫, Bakeneko); 148. "The Captive" (囚われた男, Torawareta Otoko)
16	April 18, 2023	978-4-09-852029-9	March 12, 2024	978-1-9747-4365-0
149. "Surprise Reunion" (邂逅, Kaikō); 150. "Byoki's Scheme" (猫鬼の企み, Byōki no Takurami); 151. "Missing Person" (尋ね人, Tazunebito); 152. "Hazuki" (羽月); 153. "The Otori Clan's Prayer Hall" (鳳家の祈禱所, Ōtori-ke no Kitōjo); 154. "Uncle" (おじさん, Ojisan); 155. "The Suzaku Stone" (朱雀石, Suzaku Ishi); 156. "Taking Over" (代替わり, Daigawari); 157. "The Predecessor's Curse" (先代の呪い, Sendai no Noroi); 158. "Descendant" (末裔, Matsuei)
17	August 18, 2023	978-4-09-852614-7	June 11, 2024	978-1-9747-4599-9
159. "An Official Mission" (正式な仕事, Seishiki na Shigoto); 160. "The Reason for His Resolution" (覚悟の理由, Kakugo no Riyū); 161. "The Fate of Natsuno" (夏野の生死, Natsuno no Seishi); 162. "The Vessel of the Soul" (魂の入れ物, Tamashii no Iremono); 163. "A Request for Treatment" (治療の依頼, Chiryō no Irai); 164. "Venomous Words" (言葉の毒, Kotoba no Doku); 165. "Light" (光, Hikari); 166. "The Box of Monstrosity" (化生の匣, Keshō no Hako); 167. "The Whereabouts of the Box" (匣の行方, Hako no Yukue); 168. "The Traveling Cursed Artifact" (移動する呪具, Idōsuru Jugu)
18	November 17, 2023	978-4-09-853012-0	September 10, 2024	978-1-9747-4884-6
169. "Endless Tragedy" (終わらぬ惨劇, Owaranu Sangeki); 170. "Encirclement" (包囲, Hōi); 171. "The Master of the Box" (匣の主, Hako no Aruji); 172. "Mature" (成長, Seichō); 173. "Paper Fox" (紙の狐, Kami no Kitsune); 174. "The Black Needle" (黒い針, Kuroi Hari); 175. "The Pain of the Curse" (呪いの痛み, Noroi no Itami); 176. "Kagari's Choice" (かがりの選択, Kagari no Sentaku); 177. "The Village of Human Sacrifice" (人身御供の村, Hitomigokū no Mura); 178. "The Ritual" (儀式, Gishiki)
19	February 16, 2024	978-4-09-853112-7	January 14, 2025	978-1-9747-5158-7
179. "Water Dragon" (水竜, Suiryū); 180. "Condemnation" (断罪, Danzai); 181. "The Chosen Path" (選んだ道, Eranda Michi); 182. "Shinobazu Pond" (不忍池, Shinobazu no Ike); 183. "The Source of the Life" (命の出処, Inochi no Dedokoro); 184. "Blue Eyes" (青い瞳, Aoi Hitomi); 185. "Nuemaru Mound" (鵺丸塚, Nuemaru-zuka); 186. "Sokushinbutsu" (即身仏); 187. "The Guidance of the Ceramic Bell" (土鈴の導き, Dorei no Michibiki); 188. "The Symbol of Anger" (怒りの象徴, Ikari no Shōchō)
20	May 17, 2024	978-4-09-853294-0	May 13, 2025	978-1-9747-5494-6
189. "Claw Marks" (爪跡, Tsumeato); 190. "Face of a Beast" (獣の顔, Kemono no Kao); 191. "The Price of Regeneration" (修復の代償, Shūfuku no Daishō); 192. "Human Heart" (人の心, Hito no Kokoro); 193. "Beyond Admiration" (憧れのその先, Akogare no Sono Saki); 194. "The Power to Exorcise" (祓う力, Harau Chikara); 195. "Byoki and Yurako" (猫鬼と幽羅子, Byōki to Yurako); 196. "Yurako's Wish" (幽羅子の望み, Yurako no Nozomi); 197. "Whereabouts of the Soul" (魂の在所, Tamashii no Arika); 198. "Dark Shadow" (暗い影, Kurai Kage)
21	August 17, 2024	978-4-09-853545-3	August 12, 2025	978-1-9747-5557-8
199. "The Reason Behind the Curse" (呪った理由, Norotta Wake); 200. "The Determination to Curse" (呪う覚悟, Norou Kakugo); 201. "The Bewitching Flute" (子寄せの笛, Koyose no Fue); 202. "The Flute Player" (笛使い, Fuetsukai); 203. "The Curse of the Flute's Tune" (笛の音の呪縛, Fue no Ne no Jubaku); 204. "The Living Doll" (生人形, Ikiningyō); 205. "Doll Maker" (人形師, Ningyōshi); 206. "Doll Workshop" (人形工房, Ningyō Kōbō); 207. "Power Source" (動力, Dōryoku); 208. "A Fitting Punishment" (耐えがたい罰, Taegatai Batsu)
22	November 18, 2024	978-4-09-853679-5	November 11, 2025	978-1-9747-5893-7
209. "Metal Vanquishes Wood" (金剋木, Kin Koku Moku); 210. "Made an Example of Him" (見せしめ, Miseshime); 211. "Black Snakes" (黒い蛇, Kuroi Hebi); 212. "Separated" (分離, Bunri); 213. "Uneasiness" (不安, Fuan); 214. "The Oni's Arm" (鬼の腕, Oni no Ude); 215. "Sacrifice" (身代わり, Migawari); 216. "Praying" (祈り, Inori); 217. "Nightmare" (悪夢, Akumu); 218. "Blood and Fragrant Wood" (血と香木, Chi to Kōboku)
23	February 18, 2025	978-4-09-854009-9	February 10, 2026	978-1-9747-6159-3
219. "Daigo's Divine Protection" (大五の加護, Daigo no Kago); 220. "Warning" (警告の記憶, Keikoku no Kioku); 221. "Parting Words" (別れの言葉, Wakare no Kotoba); 222. "Where It All Began" (始まりの場所, Hajimari no Basho); 223. "Curse of Immortality" (不死の呪い, Fushi no Noroi); 224. "The Spell of Pot Binding" (壺結の術, Koketsu no Jutsu); 225. "Shiranui's Sin" (不知火の罪, Shiranui no Tsumi); 226. "The Goko Clan's Boat" (御降家の舟, Gokō-ke no Fune); 227. "Unkillable" (不死身の化け物, Fujimi no Bakemono); 228. "Family Ties" (身内の情, Miuchi no Jō)
24	May 16, 2025	978-4-09-854112-6	May 12, 2026	978-1-9747-6297-2
229. "Hope and Salvation" (望みと救い, Nozomi to Sukui); 230. "Molder of Faces" (造顔師, Zōganshi); 231. "Facial Ointment" (顔と薬, Kao to Kusuri); 232. "The Face in the Jar" (壺の中の顔, Tsubo no Naka no Kao); 233. "Be Strong" (強く, Tsuyoku); 234. "The Return of the Terror" (戻ってきた厄災, Modottekita Yakusai); 235. "Fire and Water" (火と水, Hi to Mizu); 236. "Earth Vanquishes Water" (土剋水, Do Koku Sui); 237. "Ally" (味方, Mikata); 238. "Resentment and Hope" (恨みと望み, Urami to Nozomi)
25	August 18, 2025	978-4-09-854208-6	August 11, 2026	978-1-9747-1663-0
239. "The Bronze Mirror" (銅鏡, Dōkyō); 240. "Mirror of the Sea Dragon" (海龍鏡, Kairyūkyō); 241. "Protection and Murderous Intent" (加護と殺意, Kago to Satsui); 242. "Earth Brand" (刻印, Kokuin); 243. "Shiranui's Shrine" (不知火の社, Shiranui no Yashiro); 244. "Pursuit" (追跡, Tsuiseki); 245. "Warmth" (温もり, Nukumori); 246. "The Whereabouts of the Spear" (槍の行方, Yari no Yukue); 247. "Enmity" (憎悪, Zōo); 248. "Needle and Beast" (針と獣, Hari to Kemono)
26	November 18, 2025	978-4-09-854328-1	November 10, 2026	978-1-9747-6862-2
249. "Soma's Murderous Intent" (双馬の殺意, Sōma no Satsui); 250. "Blood and Earth" (血と土, Chi to Tsuchi); 251. "Exorcising the Beast" (獣を祓う, Kemono o Harau); 252. "Iron Rat" (鉄鼠, Tesso); 253. "Disintegrating Body" (蝕まれた体, Mushibamareta Karada); 254. "The Man You Killed" (殺した男, Koroshita Otoko); 255. "Inside the Whirlpool" (渦の中, Uzu no Naka); 256. "Intention" (狙い, Nerai); 257. "Shiranui's Feelings" (不知火の想い, Shiranui no Omoi); 258. "Suspicion Arises" (疑惑の芽生え, Giwaku no Mebae)
27	February 18, 2026	978-4-09-854450-9	February 9, 2027	978-1-9747-6979-7
259. "Whistleblowing" (密告, Mikkoku); 260. "Arm of the Beast" (獣の腕, Kemono no Ude); 261. "The Monster of the Mountain" (山の怪異, Yama no Kaii); 262. "Cleaning Up the Mess" (後始末, Atoshimatsu); 263. "Cheer Up" (元気出して, Genki Dashite); 264. "House of Abandonment" (姥捨山, Ubasuteyama); 265. "Mortuary Tower" (霊安塔, Reiantō); 266. "Parasite Moth" (宿り蛾, Yadoriga); 267. "Rehearsal" (予行練習, Yokō Renshū); 268. "Fox Spirit Needle" (妖狐針, Yōkoshin)
28	April 1, 2026	978-4-09-854531-5	—	—
269. "Mutual Destruction" (相打ち, Aiuchi); 270. "Powerless" (無力, Muryoku); 271. "Little Brothers" (弟たち, Otōto-tachi); 272. "Brotherly Love" (兄の思い, Ani no Omoi); 273. "Traitor" (反逆, Hangyaku); 274. "The Face at the End" (最期の顔, Saigo no Kao); 275. "Raven Haired" (黒髪, Kuro Kami); 276. "Moment of Death" (死の幻影, Shi no Gen'ei); 277. "The Magical Power of Hair" (髪の霊力, Kami no Reiryoku); 278. "The Moss of Earth's Ruin" (土殺しの苔, Tsuchigoroshi no Koke)
29	June 18, 2026	978-4-09-854648-0	—	—
279. "The Two of Us" (たた二人で, Tata Futari de); 280. "A New Face" (初めて見せた表情, Hajimete Miseta Kao); 281. "Iron Beast" (鉄の獣, Tetsu no Kemono); 282. "The Seeds of Suspicion" (不安の芽生え, Fuan no Mebae); 283. "Repaying My Debt" (御恩返し, Go-ongaeshi); 284. "Not About Liking or Disliking" (好き嫌いじゃない, Suki Kirai ja Nai); 285. "Confinement" (監禁, Kankin); 286. "A House Full of Soil" (土のつまった家, Tsuchi no Tsumatta Ie); 287. "Daigo's Trap" (大五の罠, Daigo no Wana); 288. "The Feeling is Mutual" (同じ気持ち, Onaji Kimochi)
30	August 18, 2026	978-4-09-854739-5	—	—
289. "Sincerity" (誠実な思い, Seijitsu na Omoi); 290. "Steel Beast" (鋼の獣, Hagane no Kemono); 291. "Doubt and Peace" (不安と安らぎ, Fuan to Yasuragi); 292. "The Mystery of the Bronze Statues" (銅像化の謎, Dōzōka no Nazo); 293. "The Sword of Poison Water" (毒水の剣, Dokumizu no Tsurugi); 294. "The Key to Lifting the Curse" (呪いの解く鍵, Noroi no Toku Kagi); 295. "The Fate of the Sword" (剣の始末, Tsurugi no Shimatsu); 296. "Under Hakubi's Eye" (白眉の監視, Hakubi no Kanshi); 297. "Needle to Needle" (針と針, Hari to Hari); 298. "Loyalty" (忠誠心, Chūseishin)
31	October 16, 2026	978-4-09-854856-9	—	—
299. "Kagari's Whereabouts" (かがりの行方, Kagari no Yukue); 300. "Escape" (脱出, Dasshutsu); 301. "Punishment" (制裁, Seisai); 302. "Exorcising the Seeds of Haku" (魄の種を払う, Haku no Tane o Harau); 303. "The Man-Eating Tree" (人喰いの木, Hitokui no Ki); 304. "Mei's Whereabouts" (芽生の安否, Mei no Anpi); 305. "Powerless" (力の及ばぬ者たち, Chikara no Oyobanu Mono-tachi); 306. "Same Words" (同じ言葉, Onaji Kotoba); 307. "The Shadow Within the Soul" (魂の影, Tamashii no Kage); 308. "The Murder of the Master" (師匠殺し, Shishō Koroshi)

== Chapters not yet in tankōbon format ==
309. "The Curse of the Fragrant Wood" (香木の呪い, Kōboku no Noroi)
310. "Memories of the Succession" (代替わりの記憶, Daigawari no Kioku)
311. "A Scent That Recalls Memories" (懐かしい匂い, Natsukashii Nioi)
312. "Kamon's Murderous Intent" (華紋の殺意, Kamon no Satsui)
313. "The Seed Inside the Mirror" (鏡の中の種, Kagami no Naka no Tane)
314. "The Cage of Sealing" (封印の檻, Fūin no Ori)
315. "Searching Through Memories" (記憶を探る, Kioku o Saguru)
316. "Bisque Doll" (西洋人形, Seiyō Ningyō)
317. "Katashiro of Guidance" (導きの形代, Michibiki no Katashiro)
318. "Persuasion" (説得, Settoku)
319. "The State of Mei" (芽生の姿, Mei no Sugata)
320. "Prototype" (試作品, Shisakuhin)
321. "Bonds" (結びつき, Musubitsuki)
322. "Divergent Paths" (道は分かれる, Michi wa Wakareru)
323. "Becoming Human Again" (人に戻る時, Hito ni Madoru Toki)
324. "The Power of a Pure Heart" (清浄な力, Seijō na Chikara)
325. "Yurako's Resolve" (幽羅子の決意, Yurako no Ketsui)
326. "Bonds and Calculations" (悪縁と損得, Akuen to Sontoku)
327. "The Light at the Bottom of the Water" (水底の光, Minazoko no Hikari)
328. "Sin and Resolve" (罪と覚悟, Tsumi to Kakugo)
329. "I Know, But..." (わかってるけど, Wakatteru Kedo)
330. "Grave Robber" (墓嵐らし, Hakaarashi)
331. "The Villagers' Whereabouts" (村人たちの行方, Murahitotachi no Yukue)
332. "The Disappearing Bodies" (遺体の消失, Itai no Shoushitsu)
333. "The Forest Trap" (森の罠, Mori no Wana)
334. "The Yin-Yang Magatama Beads" (陰陽の勾玉, Inyou no Magatama)
335. "Concealment" (秘匿, Hitoku)
336. "Testing One's Malice" (悪意を試す, Akui o Tamesu)
337. "The Truth and the Reason" (祓わない理由, Harawanai Wake)
338. "The Beautiful Boy of the Circus" (サーカス美少年, Sākasu Bishōnen)
339. "The Elixir of Immortality" (不老不死の薬, Furoufushi no Kusuri)
340. "Uwabami" (ウワバミ, Uwabami)
341. "The Ayakashi and the Boy" (人間と妖, Ningen to Ayakashi)
342. "Puppet Bell" (傀儡鈴, Kugutsurei)
343. "Tainted Soil" (汚された土, Yogosareta Tsuchi)
344. "The Quicksilver Shikigami" (水銀の式神, Suigin no Shikigami)
