= Koibumi to 13-sai no Actress =

Japanese manga series

- First tankōbon volume cover

恋文と13歳の女優(アクトレス) (Koibumi to 13-sai no Akutoresu)
- Genre: Romance
- Manga
- Written by: Jaga
- Published by: Houbunsha
- Imprint: FUZ Comics
- Magazine: Comic Fuz
- Original run: September 20, 2022 – present
- Volumes: 9

Koibumi to 13-sai no Actress (恋文と13歳の女優(アクトレス), Koibumi to 13-sai no Akutoresu; lit. 'A Love Letter and a 13-Year-Old Actress') is a Japanese manga series written and illustrated by Jaga. It began serialization on Houbunsha's Comic Fuz online service in September 2022, and has been compiled into nine volumes as of September 2026.

== Plot ==
The series follows Fumi Isshiki, who works for the accounting department at JG Production Management. He is suddenly transferred to the company's management department, where he is called to serve as manager to Ayano Haga, one of their talents, until her manager came back from parental leave. As Fumi works with Ayano, the latter quickly becomes attached to him and later develops feelings for him.

== Characters ==
Fumi Isshiki (一色 文, Isshiki Fumi)
Previously working as an accountant at JG Production Management, he was transferred to the management department due to a worker shortage. He is temporarily assigned as Ayano Haga's manager while her regular manager Morioka is on leave. He quickly becomes attached to Ayano and becomes protective of her.
Ayano Haga (羽賀 文乃, Haga Ayano)
A 13-year old middle school student and talent at JG Production Management. She started her career as a child actress but put her career on hold to focus on her studies. Fumi is assigned to work with her as she resumed her career. She quickly becomes attached to Fumi and develops feelings for him. She was raised in a single-parent household with her mother.

== Publication ==
The series is written and illustrated by Jaga. It began serialization on Houbunsha's Comic Fuz online service on September 20, 2022. The first volume was released on April 27, 2023. The series has been compiled into nine tankōbon volumes as of November 2026.

No.	Release date	ISBN
1	April 27, 2023	978-4-8322-3989-0
2	June 1, 2023	978-4-8322-3996-8
3	November 1, 2023	978-4-8322-0336-5
4	April 1, 2024	978-4-8322-0383-9
5	September 2, 2024	978-4-8322-0428-7
6	March 1, 2025	978-4-8322-0482-9
7	October 1, 2025	978-4-8322-0545-1
8	April 28, 2026	978-4-8322-0611-3
9	November 2, 2026	978-4-8322-0665-6
