= Mao Ichimichi =

Japanese voice actress (born 1992)

- 市道 真央
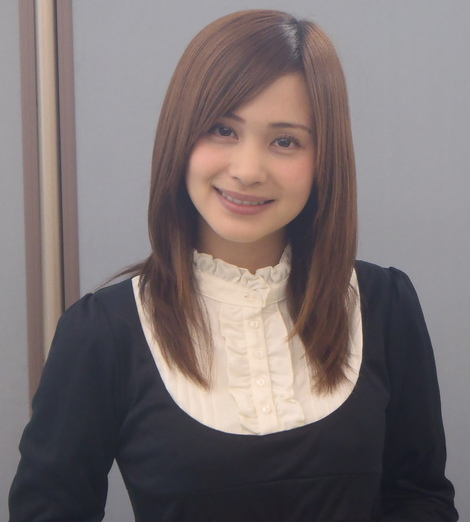
- Ichimichi in 2012
- Born: February 1, 1992 (age 34); Osaka, Japan
- Other names: M·A·O; Rio Minami
- Occupations: Actress; voice actress
- Years active: 2010–present
- Agent: Yellow Cab Next
- Height: 158 cm (5 ft 2 in)

Mao Ichimichi (市道 真央, Ichimichi Mao; born February 1, 1992) is a Japanese actress. She started her career as a Japanese idol member of Horipro's HOP Club under the stage name Rio Minami (南 梨央, Minami Rio) and is a gravure idol. She started an extensive voice acting career under the stage name M・A・O.

== Biography ==
Ichimichi worked with Horipro's idol group HOP Club with the stage name Rio Minami (南 梨央, Minami Rio). She appeared in the variety show Enter! 371. After releasing the idol DVD Ike Ike Go! Go! HOP Club, she left the group. She joined Yellow Cab Next and became a co-host in the Weekly Shōnen Jump variety show Sakiyomi Jum-Bang!. She played Luka Millfy/Gokai Yellow in the Super Sentai series Kaizoku Sentai Gokaiger, following the footsteps of her former HOP Club batch mate Suzuka Morita. She released her first solo gravure idol DVD A Distant Shore, along with a companion photo book of the same title. She promoted her second idol video Apartment and photo book Afternoon Tea in December. She released modeling calendars for Try-X.

== Filmography ==
=== Live-action ===
==== Television ====
Year	Title	Role	Notes	Source
2010–2014	Sakiyomi Jum-Bang!	Informational Corner segments	Variety show	Resume
2011–2012	Kaizoku Sentai Gokaiger	Luka Millfy / Gokai Yellow	Main role	Resume
2016	Doubutsu Sentai Zyuohger	Luka Millfy / Gokai Yellow	Eps. 28-29	
2017–2018	Uchu Sentai Kyuranger	Raptor 283 / Washi Pink	Voice role	
2019	Super Sentai Strongest Battle	Luka Millfy / Gokai Yellow	eps. 1,3,4	
2019–2020	Kishiryu Sentai Ryusoulger	Kishiryu Chibigaroo	Voice role, eps. 27-28	
2020	Kamen Rider Zero-One	Ai-chan	Voice role, eps. 36-38, 44	
2021–2022	Ultraman Trigger: New Generation Tiga	Alien Metron "Marluru"	Voice role	

==== Film ====
Year	Title	Role	Notes	Source
2011	Tensou Sentai Goseiger vs. Shinkenger: Epic on Ginmaku	Gokai Yellow	Cameo	
2011	Gokaiger Goseiger Super Sentai 199 Hero Great Battle	Luka Millfy / Gokai Yellow		
2011	Kaizoku Sentai Gokaiger the Movie: The Flying Ghost Ship	Luka Millfy / Gokai Yellow		
2012	Kaizoku Sentai Gokaiger vs. Space Sheriff Gavan: The Movie	Luka Millfy / Gokai Yellow		
2012	Kamen Rider × Super Sentai: Super Hero Taisen	Luka Millfy / Gokai Yellow		
2013	Tokumei Sentai Go-Busters vs. Kaizoku Sentai Gokaiger: The Movie	Luka Millfy / Gokai Yellow		
2013	009-1: The End of the Beginning	Sharon		
2014	Gothic Lolita Battle Bear	Kyoko Aikawa		
2014	Ressha Sentai ToQger the Movie: Galaxy Line S.O.S.	Passko (voice)	Cameo	
2017	Kamen Rider × Super Sentai: Ultra Super Hero Taisen	Raptor 283 / Washi Pink		
2018	Uchu Sentai Kyuranger vs. Space Squad	Raptor 283 / Washi Pink; Luka Millfy		
2021	Kaizoku Sentai: Ten Gokaiger	Luka Millfy / Gokai Yellow		

==== Idol videos ====
Year	Series	Role	Notes	Source
2006–2010	Hop Club videos	Herself		
2011	A Distant Shore	Herself	First solo gravure idol video	
2011	Apartment	Herself		

=== Anime ===
==== Television ====
Year	Title	Role	Notes	Source
2009	Cooking Idol Ai! Mai! Main!	Kirakira	part anime, part live-action	
2013	DD Fist of the North Star	Lin		
2013	Chronicles of the Going Home Club	Azarashi		
2013	Teekyu 2	Kindergartener, Clerk		
2013	Silver Spoon	Chidori Ikeda		
2013	Wanna Be the Strongest in the World	MC		
2013	Samurai Flamenco	Mizuki Misawa		
2014	Noragami	Yui Ayumu		
2014	Z/X Ignition	Fierte		
2014	Magical Warfare	Ena Kisaki		
2014	World Conquest Zvezda Plot	Renge Komadori		
2014	Inari, Konkon, Koi Iroha	Imadegawa, Schoolgirl		
2014	Brynhildr in the Darkness	Kazumi Schlierenzauer		
2014	Locodol	Tomoko Usami		
2014	Sword Art Online II	Girl, Girl student		
2014	Magic Kaito 1412	Aoko Nakamori		
2014	Ai Tenchi Muyo!	Nana Saruha		
2014	Hi-sCoool! SeHa Girls	Dreamcast		
2014	Gonna be the Twin-Tail!!	Mikoto Sakuragawa		
2015	Death Parade	Mai Takada		
2015–16	Durarara!!x2 series	Vorona		
2015	World Break: Aria of Curse for a Holy Swordsman	Kyoko Takanashi 高梨恭子		
2015	Isuca	Suseri Shimazu		
2015	Re-Kan!	Kyōko Esumi		
2015	Ultimate Otaku Teacher	Madoka Kuramachi		
2015	Triage X	Yoko Komine 小峯蓉子		
2015	Chaos Dragon: Sekiryū Sen'eki	Izun イズン		
2015	Rampo Kitan: Game of Laplace	Higashi Koji Chiyako ヒガシコウジチヨコ		
2015	Castle Town Dandelion	White ginkgo 白銀杏		
2015	Wakaba Girl	Mao Kurokawa		
2015	Kurayami Santa	Kazuyuki Kanegawa 鹿羽一之助		
2015	My Monster Secret	Akane Kōmoto		
2015	Overlord	Enri Emmot		
2015	School-Live!	Yūri Wakasa		
2015	Venus Project Climax	Boss Sho 下司麗		
2015	The Idolmaster Cinderella Girls 2nd Season	Fumika Sagisawa		
2015	Diabolik Lovers: More Blood	Christina クリスティーナ		
2015	Lance N' Masques	Ryu Yuifa		
2015	Young Black Jack	fan ファン		
2015	Chivalry of a Failed Knight	Renren Tomaru		
2015–16	The Asterisk War series	Yosuga Migahara 美ヶ原よすが	2 seasons	
2015	Onsen Yōsei Hakone-chan	Haruna		
2015	Rainy Cocoa	Madam マダム		
2015	Aria the Scarlet Ammo AA	Raika Hino		
2015	DD Fist of the North Star 2	Lin		
2015	Dance with Devils	Schoolgirl		
2015	Is the Order a Rabbit?	A customer 客		
2016	Phantasy Star Online 2: The Animation	Aika Suzuki		
2016	Rainbow Days	Mori Rina 森リナ		
2016	Undefeated Bahamut Chronicle	Sonia Remist サニア・レミスト		
2016	Space Patrol Luluco	Luluco		
2016	Seisen Cerberus	Saraato		
2016	Hundred	Claire Harvey		
2016	Kuromukuro	Yukina Shirakane		
2016	And You Thought There Is Never a Girl Online?	Kyō Goshōin		
2016	Tonkatsu DJ Agetarō	Sonoko Hattori		
2016	Taboo Tattoo	Aisha アイーシャ		
2016	This Art Club Has a Problem!	Yuka Koeda 小枝木由佳		
2016	Alderamin on the Sky	Ikta Solork (child)		
2016	Monster Hunter Stories: Ride On	Navirou		
2016	Mobile Suit Gundam: Iron-Blooded Orphans Season 2	Julieta Juris		
2016	Flip Flappers	Papika		
2016	Keijo	Sayaka Miyata		
2016	ClassicaLoid	Baranowska		
2016–19	The Disastrous Life of Saiki K.	Imu Rifuta	Debuted in 2nd season	
2017	Blue Exorcist: Kyoto Saga	Mamushi Hojo		
2017–20	One Room	Yui Hanasaka 花坂結衣	3 seasons	
2017–20	Tsugumomo	Taguri Kanayama	2 seasons	
2017	Food Wars! Shokugeki no Souma: The Third Plate	Mea Yanai		
2017	Hinako Note	Hinako Sakuragi		
2017	Twin Angel Break	Meguru Amatsuki/Angel Rose		
2017	Kado: The Right Answer	Saraka Tsukai		
2017	Aho-Girl	Akane Eimura		
2017	Nana Maru San Batsu	Yuki Kōzuki		
2017	Action Heroine Cheer Fruits	Misaki Shirogane		
2017	Classroom of the Elite	Airi Sakura		
2017	King's Game The Animation	Chiemi Honda		
2017	Granblue Fantasy The Animation	Narmaya	Episode 12	
2018	Katana Maidens ~ Toji No Miko	Suzuka Konohana	also Mini Toji	
2018	Slow Start	Shion Kyōzuka		
2018–22	Teasing Master Takagi-san	Yukari Tenkawa	3 seasons	
2018	The Seven Deadly Sins : Revival of the Commandments	Melascula	season 2 Eps. 2-4, 6 - ,	
2018	A Certain Magical Index III	Stephanie Gorgeouspalace		
2018	Black Clover	Fana		
2018	Gurazeni	Yuki		
2018	Magical Girl Site	Sayuki Ringa		
2018	Last Period	Campanella		
2018	Cells at Work!	Eosinophil		
2018	Dropkick on My Devil!	Beth		
2018–21	That Time I Got Reincarnated as a Slime	Shion		
2018	RErideD: Derrida, who leaps through time	Mage Bilstein		
2018	Uchi no Maid ga Uzasugiru!	Midori Ukai	Eps. 6-	
2019	Magical Girl Spec-Ops Asuka	Tamara Volkova		
2019	Mob Psycho 100 II	Minori Asagiri		
2019	Fruits Basket	Motoko Minagawa		
2019	Over Drive Girl 1/6	Subaru Amanohara		
2019	Ultramarine Magmell	Zero		
2019	Are You Lost?	Homare Onishima		
2019	Demon Lord, Retry!	Organ		
2019–20	Fire Force	Iris		
2019	Wasteful Days of High School Girls	Hisui "Majo" Kujō		
2019	Senki Zesshō Symphogear XV	Vanessa		
2019	BEM	Bela		
2019	Is It Wrong to Try to Pick Up Girls in a Dungeon? II	Lena Tally		
2019	Hōkago Saikoro Club	Emilia		
2019	Val × Love	Röskva		
2019	Babylon	Hiasa Sekuro		
2019	Kandagawa Jet Girls	Aqua Manjo		
2019	Beastars	Sally		
2019	Rifle Is Beautiful	Rei Asakura		
2020	Id – Invaded	Hondomachi		
2020	Pet	Jin		
2020	Nekopara	Shigure Minaduki		
2020	Hatena Illusion	Emma Sakurai		
2020	Interspecies Reviewers	Meidri		
2020	Magia Record	Nanaka Tokiwa	Episode 6	
2020	The 8th Son? Are You Kidding Me?	Wilmal		
2020	Arte	Katarina		
2020	My Next Life as a Villainess: All Routes Lead to Doom!	Nicol Ascart (childhood)		
2020	Dropkick on My Devil!! Dash	Beth		
2020–22	Princess Connect! Re:Dive	Pecorine/Eustiana von Astraea	2 seasons	
2020	Monster Girl Doctor	Lorna Arte		
2020	Warlords of Sigrdrifa	Azuzu Komagome		
2021	Suppose a Kid from the Last Dungeon Boonies Moved to a Starter Town	Choline		
2021	Gekidol	Doll		
2021	WIXOSS Diva(A)Live	Yuki Azami		
2021–23	Horimiya	Remi Ayasaki	Also The Missing Pieces	
2021	Kiyo in Kyoto: From the Maiko House	Sumire, Momohana		
2021	Dragon Goes House-Hunting	Albert		
2021	The Way of the Househusband	Gin		
2021	How a Realist Hero Rebuilt the Kingdom	Roroa Amidonia		
2021	Peach Boy Riverside	Frau		
2021	The Dungeon of Black Company	Ranga		
2021	Irina: The Vampire Cosmonaut	Lyudmila Halrova		
2021	Platinum End	Saki Hanakago		
2022	Irodorimidori	Naru Hakobe		
2022	Life with an Ordinary Guy Who Reincarnated into a Total Fantasy Knockout	Hinata Tachibana (Female)		
2022	Miss Kuroitsu from the Monster Development Department	Akashic		
2022	Hairpin Double	Red/Azumi Shibukawa		
2022	Shenmue: The Animation	Joy		
2022	Aharen-san Is Indecipherable	Mitsuki Ōshiro		
2022	The Executioner and Her Way of Life	Ashuna		
2022	Birdie Wing: Golf Girls' Story	Kaoruko Iijima		
2022	Love After World Domination	Hellko		
2022	In the Heart of Kunoichi Tsubaki	Konoha		
2022	Dropkick on My Devil!!! X	Beth		
2022	Lucifer and the Biscuit Hammer	Anima		
2022	Hanabi-chan Is Often Late	Thunder Rai Nihonbashi		
2022	My Master Has No Tail	Mameda		
2022	Me & Roboco	Madoka		
2022	Beast Tamer	Tina Hollee	Episode 13	
2023	Junji Ito Maniac: Japanese Tales of the Macabre	Kaoru Yoshikawa		
2023	Ultraman	Balkyua	Season 3	
2023	Yohane the Parhelion: Sunshine in the Mirror	Kohaku		
2023	The Most Heretical Last Boss Queen	Sefek		
2023	The Masterful Cat Is Depressed Again Today	Rio Nishina		
2023	Synduality: Noir	Schnee		
2023	The Yuzuki Family's Four Sons	Saki Kirishima		
2024	The Fire Hunter 2nd Season	Ruri Matsuri		
2024	A Salad Bowl of Eccentrics	Livia Do Udis		
2024	Go! Go! Loser Ranger!	Pink Keeper		
2024	2.5 Dimensional Seduction	Mayuri Hanyu		
2024	Dungeon People	Fūrin		
2024	VTuber Legend: How I Went Viral After Forgetting to Turn Off My Stream	Eirai Sonokaze		
2024	Trillion Game	Kirika Kokuryu		
2025	Aquarion: Myth of Emotions	Murua Satene		
2025	From Bureaucrat to Villainess: Dad's Been Reincarnated!	Grace Auvergne		
2025	I Left My A-Rank Party to Help My Former Students Reach the Dungeon Depths!	Jamie		
2025	The Red Ranger Becomes an Adventurer in Another World	Tenri Nikaidō/Kizuna Silver		
2025	A Ninja and an Assassin Under One Roof	Fumiko Kusagakure		
2025	Secrets of the Silent Witch	Rynzbelfeid		
2025	Scooped Up by an S-Rank Adventurer!	Claire		
2025	Sakamoto Days	Akira Akao		
2025	Alma-chan Wants to Be a Family!	Suzume Yobane		
2025	The Dark History of the Reincarnated Villainess	Konoha Magnolia		
2025	Li'l Miss Vampire Can't Suck Right	Eiko Sakuma		
2026	The Holy Grail of Eris	Lily Orlamunde		
2026	Easygoing Territory Defense by the Optimistic Lord	Till		
2026	My Ribdiculous Reincarnation	Goddess		
2026	Fist of the North Star	Rin		
2026	Iron Wok Jan	Celene Yang		
2026	Kamui: He's Behind You	Oichi		
2026	I Became a Legend After My 10 Year-Long Last Stand	Luccira		
2026	My Stepmother and Stepsisters Aren't Wicked	Mitsuya		
2026	Magical Explorer	Nanami		
2026	Magical Girl Raising Project: Restart	Rionetta		
2027	Bride of the Barrier Master	Miyabi		
2027	Shin Kochira Katsushika-ku Kameari Kōen Mae Hashutsujo	Reiko Akimoto		

==== Film ====
Year	Title	Role	Notes	Source
2013	Persona 3 The Movie: No. 1, Spring of Birth	Female Student A		
2014	Yūto-kun ga Iku	Lulu		
2015–18	Digimon Adventure tri.	Hikari Yagami		
2015	Arpeggio of Blue Steel -Ars Nova- DC	Hiei		
2015	Cyborg 009 VS Devilman	Françoise Arnoul/003		
2016	Gantz: O	Anzu Yamasaki	3d anime film	
2016	Pop in Q	Tadona		
2017	Trinity Seven the Movie: The Eternal Library and the Alchemist Girl	Anastasia-L		
2019	Promare	Thyma		
2020	Digimon Adventure: Last Evolution Kizuna	Hikari Yagami		
2020	The Island of Giant Insects	Mutsumi Oribe		
2020	BEM: Become Human	Bela		
2021	Eureka - Eureka Seven: Hi-Evolution	Kira Pometo		
2022	Eien no 831	Nazuna Hashimoto		
2022	Teasing Master Takagi-san: The Movie	Yukari Tenkawa		
2022	That Time I Got Reincarnated as a Slime the Movie: Scarlet Bond	Shion		
2023	Digimon Adventure 02: The Beginning	Hikari Yagami		

=== Video games ===
Year	Title	Role	Console	Source
2011	Super Sentai games	Luka Millfy/Gokai Yellow		
2014	Bullet Girls	Aya Hinomoto		
2014	Caladrius BLAZE	Noah & Nina Twinning	PS3	
2015	Possession Magenta	Mimi Masuki 文月美玲	Other	
2015	Aegis of Earth: Protonovus Assault	Towa	PS3, other	
2015	Mighty No. 9	Call		
2015	Nights of Azure	Arnice	PS3, other	
2015	Omega Labyrinth	Saeri Soja	PS Vita	
2015	Superdimension Neptune vs Sega Hard Girls	Dreamcast	PS Vita	
2015	Majo Koi Nikki Dragon x Caravan	Sanada Ryuraku 真田甘楽	Other	
2015	Granblue Fantasy	Narmaya, Pecorine	PC, Android, iOS	
2016	Bullet Girls 2	Aya Hinomoto	PS Vita	
2016	Girls' Frontline	ADS, PA-15	iOS, Android	
2016	Genkai Tokki: Seven Pirates	Claret	PS Vita	
2016	Monster Hunter Stories	Navirou ナビルー	3DS	
2016	Recolove	Oga Nishinaga 御前渚紗	Blue Ocean and Gold Beach	
2016	Idol Death Game TV	Ren Isahaya	PS Vita	
2017	SINoALICE	Alice	iOS, Android	
2017	Magia Record	Nanaka Tokiwa	iOS, Android	
2017	Nights of Azure 2: Bride of the New Moon	Arnice	PS4, other	
2017	Xenoblade Chronicles 2	Nim	Nintendo Switch	
2018	Grand Chase: Dimensional Chaser	Amy	Pc, Android, iOS	
2019	Another Eden	Felmina	iOS, Android, Nintendo Switch	
2019	Mahjong Soul	Sara & Nana Shiraishi	PC, iOS, Android	
2019	Fate/Grand Order	Europa	iOS, Android	
2019	Azur Lane	IJN Fubuki, HMS Howe, USS Nicholas	iOS, Android	
2019	Arknights	Viviana	iOS, Android	
2019	The Seven Deadly Sins: Grand Cross	Melascula of Faith	iOS, Android	
2019	13 Sentinels: Aegis Rim	Tomi Kisaragi	PS4, Nintendo Switch	
2020	Kandagawa Jet Girls	Aqua Manjo	PS4, PC	
2020	Higurashi No Naku Koro Ni Mei	Chisame Kurosawa	iOS, Android	
2021	Lord of Heroes (Mobile)	Lucilicca	iOS, Android	
2021	Birdie Crush	Jenny	iOS, Android	
2021	Alchemy Stars	Lilliam	iOS, Android	
2022	Xenoblade Chronicles 3	Ashera	Nintendo Switch	
2022	Goddess of Victory: Nikke	Snow White, Snow White: Innocent Days	iOS, Android	
2022	Neural Cloud	Florence, Nascita	iOS, Android	
2023	404 Game Re:set	Xevious	iOS, Android	
2023	Naraka: Bladepoint	Tessa	Xbox Series, PS5, PC	
2024	Granblue Fantasy: Relink	Narmaya	PS4, PS5, PC	
2024	Strinova	Celestia 星理恵	PC	
2025	Genshin Impact	Varesa	PS4, PS5, PC, Xbox, iOS, Android	
2025	Zenless Zone Zero	Ye Shunguang	PS5, PC, Xbox, iOS, Android	

==== Other dubbing ====
Title	Role	Voice dub for	Notes	Source
The Edge of Seventeen	Krista	Haley Lu Richardson		
Jumanji: Welcome to the Jungle	Bethany Walker	Madison Iseman		
Goosebumps 2: Haunted Halloween	Sarah Quinn	Madison Iseman		
Phenomena	Jennifer Corvino	Jennifer Connelly	2020 Blu-ray edition	
The Acolyte	Jecki Lon	Dafne Keen		

== Bibliography ==
- A Distant Shore (2011, companion book to idol video of the same title)
- Afternoon Tea (2012, companion book to Apartment, ISBN 9784896018240)
- Tooi Nagisa (2011, photo book, ISBN 978-4862058362)

== Discography ==
- The Idolmaster Cinderella Master 031 – Fumika Sagisawa – Fumika Sasaigawa (M・A・O) – reached number 4 on Oricon charts.
- Harumachi Clover (春待ちクローバー) – Yui Hanasaka (M・A・O) – reached number 98 on Oricon charts.

=== Drama CDs ===
Title	Role	Notes	Source
Hundred	Claire Harvey		
Gonna be the Twin-Tail!!	Mikoto Sakuragawa		
