= Eriko Matsui =

Japanese voice actress (born 1989)

- 松井 恵理子
- Born: March 8, 1989 (age 37); Nakamura-ku, Nagoya, Aichi Prefecture, Japan
- Occupations: Voice actress; singer
- Years active: 2009–present
- Agent: atrays
- Musical career
- Genres: J-Pop; Anison
- Instrument: Vocals
- Years active: 2017–present
- Label: Tokuma Japan Communications

Eriko Matsui (松井 恵理子, Matsui Eriko; born March 8, 1989) is a Japanese voice actress and singer from Nakamura-ku, Nagoya. She is affiliated with atrays.

== Early life ==
Matsui graduated from Aichi Prefectural Gamagori High School. She graduated from the voice actor talent department at Yoyogi Animation Academy. She then joined International Media Academy.

Matsui started watching anime as a child under the influence of her father and older brother, and her mother told her that voice actor Ryōtarō Okiayu played the voice of Yuu Matsuura in the television anime Marmalade Boy.

In 2017 she released her solo album debut Nijiyobi.

== Filmography ==
=== Anime ===
- Gon (2012), Prairie Dog, Rabbit
- Dusk Maiden of Amnesia (2012), Mina Suzuki
- Maoyū Maō Yūsha (2013), Mazoku Musume
- Log Horizon (2013), Isuzu, Kanako
- Akame ga Kill! (2014), Suzuka
- Girl Friend Beta (2014), Kaho Mishina
- Fairy Tail (2014), Kamika
- Locodol (2014), Sumire Mihara
- Engaged to the Unidentified (2014), Benio Yonomori
- Rail Wars! (2014), Narumi Sawara
- Log Horizon 2 (2014), Isuzu
- Sabagebu! (2014), Yayoi Isurugi
- Castle Town Dandelion (2015), Misaki Sakurada
- Chaos Dragon (2015), Gauss
- Etotama (2015), Mōtan
- Gintama° (2015), Shigeshige Tokugawa (young)
- Jewelpet: Magical Change (2015), Mitta Maia Katō
- Million Doll (2015), Yurino
- Mysterious Joker Season 2 (2015), Cyan
- Re-Kan! (2015), Merry-san
- Show By Rock!! (2015), Un
- The Idolmaster Cinderella Girls (2015), Nao Kamiya
  - The Idolmaster Cinderella Girls Theater (2017–19), also as Nao Kamiya
- Young Black Jack (2015), Mio
- Nurse Witch Komugi R (2016), Rei
- Onigiri (2016), Yoshitsune
- Kemono Friends (2017), Brown bear (ep. 11–12)
- Tsugumomo (2017), Kokuyō
- Armed Girl's Machiavellism (2017), Kirukiru Amō
- Magical Girl Site (2018), Kiyoharu Suirenji
- Anima Yell! (2018), Inukai-sensei
- Umamusume: Pretty Derby (2018), Fuji Kiseki
  - Umamusume: Pretty Derby – Beginning of a New Era (2024), Fuji Kiseki
- Mob Psycho 100 II (2019), Emi
- Magical Girl Spec-Ops Asuka (2019), Mia Cyrus
- Bermuda Triangle: Colorful Pastrale (2019), Poko, Capri
- After School Dice Club (2019), Kyōko Maki
- Yatogame-chan Kansatsu Nikki 2 Satsume (2020), Rarin Janda
- Tsugu Tsugumomo (2020), Kokuyō
- Yashahime: Princess Half-Demon (2020) Moe Higurashi
- Show by Rock!! Stars!! (2021), Un
- Log Horizon: Destruction of the Round Table (2021), Isuzu
- PuraOre! Pride of Orange (2021), Runa Hirano
- Girls' Frontline (2022), Scorpion
- Cap Kakumei Bottleman DX (2022), Nana Appu
- Date A Live IV (2022), Artemisia Bell Ashcroft
- Smile of the Arsnotoria the Animation (2022), Abramelin
- The Great Cleric (2023), Pope
- I Was Reincarnated as the 7th Prince so I Can Take My Time Perfecting My Magical Ability (2024), Shiro
- Bartender: Glass of God (2024), Kyо̄ko Kawakami
- Pokémon Horizons: The Series (2024), Kihada
- Goodbye, Dragon Life (2024), Malida
- You Are Ms. Servant (2024), Agemochitarō
- Wonderful Pretty Cure! (2024), Torame
- Makina-san's a Love Bot?! (2025), Aruma Sakimori
- A Mangaka's Weirdly Wonderful Workplace (2025), Tōko Kakunodate
- Journal with Witch (2026), Nana Daigo
- Kaiju Girl Caramelise (2026), Jumbo King

=== Original video animation ===
- Alice Gear Aegis: Heart Pounding! Actress Packed Mermaid Grand Prix! (2021), Yumi Yotsuya

=== Original net animation ===
- Ninja Slayer From Animation (2015), Machi
- Ōoku: The Inner Chambers (2023), Tokugawa Iemitsu
- Pokémon: Paldean Winds (2023), Nemona

=== Video games ===
- Kuon no Kizuna (2011), Satoko Amano
- Girl Friend BETA (2014), Kaho Mishina
- THE IDOLM@STER CINDERELLA GIRLS (2014), Nao Kamiya
- THE IDOLM@STER CINDERELLA GIRLS: STARLIGHT STAGE (2015), Nao Kamiya
- Kemono Friends (2015), Giroro (Girl Type)
- Bullet Girls 2 (2016), Ran Saejima
- NightCry (2016), Rooney
- Kirara Fantasia (2017), Polka
- Magia Record (2017), Haruka Kanade
- Yuki Yuna is a Hero: Hanayui no Kirameki (2017), Shizuka Kiryū
- Girls' Frontline (2017), M1911, FAMAS, MP40, & Škorpion vz. 61
- Alice Gear Aegis (2018), Yumi Yotsuya
- Fatal Twelve (2018), Rinka Shishimai
- Lilycle Rainbow Stage!!! (2019), Hare Kagami
- Project Sekai: Colorful Stage! Ft. Hatsune Miku (2020), Yuki Akiyama
- Smile of the Arsnotoria (2021), Abramelin
- Arknights (2021), Firewhistle
- GrimGrimoire OnceMore (2022), Gaff
- World II World (2022), Nappo
- Mario + Rabbids Sparks of Hope (2022), Rabbid Rosalina, Dryad
- Umamusume: Pretty Derby (2022), Fuji Kiseki
- Blue Archive (2023), Kuwakami Kaho
- Azur Lane (2023), Hindenburg
- Honkai: Star Rail (2023), Misha
- UsoNatsu ~The Summer Romance Bloomed From A Lie~ (2023), Mirei Shimotsuki

=== Dubbing ===
- Ninjago: Masters of Spinjitzu, Lloyd Garmadon
- The Lego Ninjago Movie, Lloyd Garmadon
- Ninjago: Dragons Rising, Lloyd Garmadon

=== Other ===
- Tonari no Kashiwagi-san (2014), Kotori Abekawa
