= You Can't Be in a Rom-Com with Your Childhood Friends! =

Japanese manga series

- First tankōbon volume cover, featuring Shio Minamo

幼馴染とはラブコメにならない (Osananajimi to wa Rabu Kome ni Naranai)
- Genre: Romantic comedy
- Manga
- Written by: Shinya Misu
- Published by: Kodansha
- English publisher: Kodansha (digital)
- Imprint: Shōnen Magazine Comics
- Magazine: Magazine Pocket
- Original run: March 22, 2022 – June 2, 2026
- Volumes: 21
- Anime television series
- Directed by: Satoshi Kuwabara
- Produced by: Azusa Itou; Yoshiyuki Shioya; Takeshi Matsuda; Nobuhiko Kurosu; Ayaka Nishimae; Hideo Shimazaki; Yousuke Ariyama; Katsuhiko Matsubara
- Written by: Mitsutaka Hirota; Mayumi Morita
- Music by: Tsubasa Itou; ZENTA; Yashikin
- Studio: Tezuka Productions
- Licensed by: Crunchyroll: SEA: Plus Media Networks Asia
- Original network: TXN (TV Tokyo), AT-X, BS NTV
- Original run: January 6, 2026 – March 24, 2026
- Episodes: 12
- icon

You Can't Be in a Rom-Com with Your Childhood Friends! (Japanese: 幼馴染とはラブコメにならない, Hepburn: Osananajimi to wa Rabu Kome ni Naranai; lit. 'It won't Become a Romcom with Childhood Friends') is a Japanese manga series written and illustrated by Shinya Misu. It was serialized on Kodansha's Magazine Pocket website from March 2022 to June 2026. An anime television series adaptation produced by Tezuka Productions aired from January to March 2026.

== Plot ==
Yonosuke Sakai has two childhood friends who are close to him: Shio Minamo and Akari Hiodoshi. As they have gotten older, he starts to see them in a different light, much to his chagrin as he wants to remain childhood friends with them. A love triangle forms between the three, with Yonosuke finding it difficult to balance their feelings with the secrets they keep from each other.

== Characters ==
Yonosuke Sakai (界 世之介, Sakai Yonosuke)
Voiced by: Takehiro Urao (Japanese); Dakota Farnsworth (English)
The protagonist, who is childhood friends with Shio, Akari, Runa and Haru. He doesn't want to fall in love with anyone, let alone his childhood friends, and is very frustrated with how the girls want to deepen their relationship with him, something he desperately tries to avoid at all costs.
Shio Minamo (水萌 汐, Minamo Shio)
Voiced by: Rin Kusumi (Japanese); Luci Christian (English)
Yonosuke's childhood friend. Because her house and Yonosuke's are next to each other, she would often sneak into his house. She is attached to him.
Akari Hiodoshi (火威 灯, Hiodoshi Akari)
Voiced by: Yū Serizawa (Japanese); Veronica Laux (English)
Yonosuke's childhood friend. Although she used to be close to Yonosuke, lately she has acted cold towards him. She has liked him for a long time and is worried that Shio will steal him from her.
Runa Tsukimi (月見 るな, Tsukimi Runa)
Voiced by: Sae Hiratsuka (Japanese); Bryn Apprill (English)
Yonosuke's childhood friend. Because she is younger than him by a year, she acts like a little sister around him.
Haru Hinata (日向 春, Hinata Haru)
Voiced by: Yūki Yamamoto (Japanese); Marwa Elda (English)
Yonosuke's childhood friend. She is an ace of track and field. Yonosuke mistakes her for a boy during childhood due to her tomboyish appearance.

== Media ==
=== Manga ===
Written and illustrated by Shinya Misu, You Can't Be in a Rom-Com with Your Childhood Friends! was serialized on Kodansha's Magazine Pocket website from March 22, 2022, to June 2, 2026. The series' chapters have been collected into twenty-one tankōbon volumes released from August 9, 2022, to July 9, 2026.

In November 2025, the series was added to Kodansha's K Manga service.

No.	Release date	ISBN
1	August 9, 2022	978-4-06-528636-4
2	October 7, 2022	978-4-06-529415-4
3	December 9, 2022	978-4-06-529943-2
4	February 9, 2023	978-4-06-530623-9
5	May 9, 2023	978-4-06-531563-7
6	July 7, 2023	978-4-06-532176-8
7	September 8, 2023	978-4-06-532885-9
8	December 7, 2023	978-4-06-533511-6
9	February 8, 2024	978-4-06-534555-9
10	April 9, 2024	978-4-06-535167-3
11	July 9, 2024	978-4-06-536121-4
12	September 9, 2024	978-4-06-536759-9
13	November 8, 2024	978-4-06-537419-1
14	February 7, 2025	978-4-06-538404-6
15	April 9, 2025	978-4-06-539049-8
16	June 9, 2025	978-4-06-539755-8
17	September 9, 2025	978-4-06-540689-2
18	November 7, 2025	978-4-06-541535-1
19	February 9, 2026	978-4-06-542590-9
20	May 8, 2026	978-4-06-543592-2
21	July 9, 2026	978-4-06-544331-6

=== Anime ===
An anime television series adaptation was announced on April 3, 2025. It is produced by Tezuka Productions and directed by Satoshi Kuwabara, with series composition handled by Mitsutaka Hirota, who also wrote the scripts with Mayumi Morita, and characters designed by Reina Iwasaki. The series aired from January 6 to March 24, 2026, on TV Tokyo and its affiliates, and other networks. (Note: TV Tokyo lists the series premiere on January 5 at 24:00, which is effectively January 6 at midnight JST.) The opening theme song is "I Love You" (あいらびゅ♡, Airabyu), performed by HoneyWorks alongside Rin Kusumi, Yū Serizawa, Sae Hiratsuka, and Yūki Yamamoto as the main characters, and the ending theme song is "Amanojaku" (あまのじゃく; lit. 'Contrarian'), performed by Hikari Kodama. Crunchyroll is streaming the series. Plus Media Networks Asia licensed the series in Southeast Asia and broadcasts it on Aniplus Asia.

==== Episodes ====
No.	Title	Directed by	Written by	Storyboarded by	Original release date
1	"Road to School? Indirect Kiss? Butt on Lap? Still Won't Start a Rom-Com"; Transliteration: "Tsūgaku-ji Demo Kansetsu Kisudemo o Shiri o Nosete mo Rabu Kome ni Naranai" (Japanese: 通学路でも間接キスでもお尻を乗せてもラブコメにならない)	Kimiharu Mutou	Mitsutaka Hirota	Satoshi Kuwabara	January 6, 2026
2	"Full Bus? Drenched in Rain? Feelings Exposed? Admiring Them? Still Won't Start a Rom-Com"; Transliteration: "Man'in Basu Demo Ame ni Nurete mo Suki ga Barete mo Akogarete mo Rabu Kome ni Naranai" (Japanese: 満員バスでも雨に濡れても好きがバレても憧れてもラブコメにならない)	Yuri Uema	Mitsutaka Hirota	Satoshi Kuwabara	January 13, 2026
3	"Admiring Them? Feeling Lonely? School at Night? Fantasizing? Old Promises? Still Won't Start a Rom-Com"; Transliteration: "Akogarete Ite mo Hitori Botchi Demo Yoru no Gakkō Demo Mōsō Shite mo Yakusoku Shite mo Rabu Kome ni Naranai" (Japanese: 憧れていてもひとりぼっちでも夜の学校でも妄想しても約束してもラブコメにならない)	Tsurugi Harada	Mayumi Morita	Satoshi Kuwabara	January 20, 2026
4	"Since I'm the Big Brother to the Little-Sister Type, Growing up Still Won't Start a Rom-Com"; Transliteration: "Imōto Kyara Demo "Onīchan" Dakara Otona ni Natte mo Rabu Kome ni Naranai" (Japanese: 妹キャラでも『お兄ちゃん』だから大人になってもラブコメにならない)	Mie Matsushima	Mitsutaka Hirota	Satoshi Kuwabara	January 27, 2026
5	"Extra Extra Hot? Finals Done? Bath Scene? Things Will Never Change? Still Won't Start a Rom-Com"; Transliteration: "Geki Gekikara de mo Tesuto Owaride Mo o Furo Kai Demo Kaerarenai Kara Rabu Kome ni Naranai" (Japanese: 激激辛でもテスト終わりでもお風呂回でも変えられないからラブコメにならない)	Minoru Yamaoka	Mayumi Morita	Minoru Yamaoka	February 3, 2026
6	"Summer Beach? Looking Away? Spent the Night? Still Won't Start a Rom-Com"; Transliteration: "Natsu no Umi de mo Mitekurenakute mo Ichi-ban Akashite mo Rabu Kome ni Naranai" (Japanese: 夏の海でも見てくれなくても一晩明かしてもラブコメにならない)	Shōtarō Kamiyama	Mayumi Morita	Satoshi Kuwabara	February 10, 2026 (Note: This episode aired at 12:55 a.m. JST, 55 minutes after the regular air time on TV Tokyo.)
7	"Relationship Talk? Sharing Half? Festival Vibes? Still Won't Start a Rom-Com"; Transliteration: "Koi Bana Shitemo Hanbunko Dewa Matsuri ni Ukarete Rabukome ni Naranai" (Japanese: 恋バナしても半分こでは祭りに浮かれてラブコメにならない)	Hasha Ishida	Mitsutaka Hirota	Satoshi Kuwabara	February 17, 2026
8	"Kept Running and Missed the Fireworks? Since It Matters Too Much, It Still Won't Start a Rom-Com"; Transliteration: "Nigeteru Mama ja Hanabi ga Owarushi Taisetsu Dakara Lovecome ni Naranai" (Japanese: 逃げてるままじゃ花火が終わるし大切だからラブコメにならない)	Kimiharu Mutou	Mitsutaka Hirota	Satoshi Kuwabara	February 24, 2026
9	"An Unfamiliar Girl Who's Your "Guy Friend"? But if You Laugh, It Still Won't Start a Rom-Com"; Transliteration: "Mishiranu Joshi de mo "Otoko Tomodachi" Dakara de mo Waracchattara Lovecome ni Naranai" (Japanese: 見知らぬ女子でも"男友達"だからでも笑っちゃったらラブコメにならない)	Yuri Uema	Mayumi Morita	Yuri Uema	March 3, 2026
10	"Feeling the Afterglow Kiss After Kiss? Become a Sports Day Committee Member? Still Won't Start a Rom-Com"; Transliteration: "Kiss Shite mo Mata Kiss Shite mo Yoin ni Hitatte mo Taiikusai Jikkou Iin de mo Lovecome ni Naranai" (Japanese: キスしてもまたキスしても余韻に浸っても体育祭実行委員でもラブコメにならない)	Kenji Seto	Mayumi Morita	Yoshihiro Ito	March 10, 2026
11	"Scared? Lost Something? Let off Steam on Sports Day? Still Won't Start a Rom-Com"; Transliteration: "Kowagatte Ite mo Ushinatte mo Taiikusai de mo Stress Hassan Shite mo Lovecome ni Naranai" (Japanese: 怖がっていても失っても体育祭でもストレス発散してもラブコメにならない)	Mie Matsushima	Mitsutaka Hirota	Satoshi Kuwabara	March 17, 2026
12	"Did the Three-Legged Race and Feel a Little Naughty? Then Doing the Scavenger Hunt Still Won't Start a Rom-Com"; Transliteration: "Nininsankyaku de mo Muramura Shitetara Karimono Kyousou de mo Lovecome ni Naranai" (Japanese: 二人三脚でもムラムラしてたら借り物競争でもラブコメにならない)	Taiji Kawanishi	Mitsutaka Hirota	Satoshi Kuwabara	March 24, 2026

== Reception ==
The series was nominated for the ninth Next Manga Awards in the web category.
