= Slow Loop =

Japanese manga series

- Cover of Slow Loop volume 1 by Houbunsha, featuring Hiyori (left) and Koharu (right)

スローループ (Surō Rūpu)
- Genre: Sports (recreational fishing)
- Manga
- Written by: Maiko Uchino
- Published by: Houbunsha
- Magazine: Manga Time Kirara Forward (2018-2025); Comic Fuz (2025-present)
- Original run: September 22, 2018 – present
- Volumes: 11
- Anime television series
- Directed by: Noriaki Akitaya
- Produced by: Shousei Itou; Shinpei Yamashita; Soujirou Arimizu; Kakeru Miura; Riko Nakagome; Shuka Nishimae
- Written by: Yuka Yamada
- Music by: Takurō Iga
- Studio: Connect
- Licensed by: Crunchyroll
- Original network: AT-X, Tokyo MX, SUN, KBS, TVA, BS11
- Original run: January 7, 2022 – March 25, 2022
- Episodes: 12

Slow Loop (スローループ, Surō Rūpu) is a Japanese recreational fishing manga series by Maiko Uchino, which was serialized in Houbunsha's seinen manga magazine Manga Time Kirara Forward from September 2018 to February 2025 before moving to the Manga app Comic Fuz in February 2025. It has been collected in eleven tankōbon volumes. On February 21, 2025, it was announced the manga will be on a hiatus as author Maiko Uchino is currently undergoing treatment for breast cancer. An anime television series adaptation by Connect aired from January to March 2022.

== Plot ==
Hiyori Yamakawa is a girl who has always felt an attachment to the ocean, a feeling that grew thanks to her late father. After her mother announces she is remarrying, Hiyori becomes nervous about having a new family and heads to the sea to process her thoughts. There, she encounters Koharu Minagi, another girl whom she teaches how to fish. Later that night, it turns out that Koharu is her stepfather's daughter, meaning she is Koharu's new stepsister. Despite Hiyori's earlier hesitation about having a new family, the two quickly become close, developing bonds through their shared experiences, such as losing a parent when they were young, and becoming closer through their interest in fishing.

== Characters ==
Hiyori Minagi (海凪 ひより, Minagi Hiyori) / Hiyori Yamakawa (山川 ひより, Yamakawa Hiyori)
Voiced by: Rin Kusumi
The series' protagonist. Her father died three years prior to the events of the series. After her mother remarries, Koharu becomes her stepsister and lives with her. She developed an interest in fishing.
Koharu Minagi (海凪 小春, Minagi Koharu)
Voiced by: Natsumi Hioka
Hiyori's stepsister. Her biological mother and brother died in an accident when she was young. Because she lived far from the ocean, she developed a fascination for the sea.
Koi Yoshinaga (吉永 恋, Yoshinaga Koi)
Voiced by: Tomomi Mineuchi
Hiyori's childhood friend, whose father runs a fishing supplies store.
Ichika Fukumoto (福元 一花, Fukumoto Ichika)
Voiced by: Kaori Nazuka
Futaba Fukumoto (福元 二葉, Fukumoto Futaba)
Voiced by: Natsumi Murakami
Aiko Ninomiya (二宮 藍子, Ninomiya Aiko)
Voiced by: Honoka Inoue
Kaede Miyano (宮野 楓, Miyano Kaede)
Voiced by: Yoko Hikasa
Niji Yoshinaga (吉永 虹, Yoshinaga Niji)
Voiced by: Nao Tōyama
Tora Yoshinaga (吉永 虎, Yoshinaga Tora)
Voiced by: Kiyono Yasuno

== Media ==
=== Manga ===
Slow Loop is written and illustrated by Maiko Uchino. The series began serialization in Houbunsha's Manga Time Kirara Forward magazine on September 22, 2018.

==== Volume list ====
No.	Release date	ISBN
1	March 12, 2019	978-4-8322-7076-3
2	October 11, 2019	978-4-8322-7125-8
3	June 12, 2020	978-4-8322-7197-5
4	January 12, 2021	978-4-8322-7241-5
5	December 10, 2021	978-4-8322-7329-0
6	March 10, 2022	978-4-8322-7354-2
7	November 10, 2022	978-4-8322-7416-7
8	August 9, 2023	978-4-8322-7475-4
9	May 11, 2024	978-4-8322-9547-6
10	March 12, 2025	978-4-8322-9622-0
11	July 10, 2026	978-4-8322-9733-3

=== Anime ===
On December 24, 2020, an anime television series adaptation was announced. The series was animated by Connect, and directed by Noriaki Akitaya, with scripts by Yuka Yamada, characters designed by Shoko Takimoto, who also served as chief animation director, and music composed by Takurō Iga. The series aired from January 7 to March 25, 2022, on AT-X and other networks. Pokapoka Ion, composed of Nao Tōyama and Kiyono Yasuno, performed the opening theme song "Yajirushi." Three ∞ Loop, composed of Rin Kusumi, Natsumi Hioka, and Tomomi Mineuchi, performed the ending theme song "Shuwa Shuwa." Funimation streamed the series outside of Asia.

==== Episode list ====
No.	Title (Note: All English titles are taken from Funimation.)	Directed by	Written by	Storyboarded by	Original release date
1	"A Very Unique Girl"; Transliteration: "Totemo Kawatta Onna no Ko" (Japanese: とても変わった女の子)	Noriaki Akitaya	Yuka Yamada	Noriaki Akitaya	January 7, 2022
2	"If You Can Just Smile"; Transliteration: "Egao ni Naretara" (Japanese: 笑顔になれたら)	Geisei Morita	Yuka Yamada	Geisei Morita	January 14, 2022
3	"Thank You"; Transliteration: "Arigatō" (Japanese: ありがとう)	Sōta Yokote	Keiichirō Ōchi	Takumi Shibata	January 21, 2022
4	"Aren't You Embarrassed?"; Transliteration: "Hazukashi Kunain Desu ka?" (Japanese: はずかしくないんですか？)	Ryūta Yamamoto	Yuka Yamada	Kazuhisa Takenouchi	January 28, 2022
5	"Together Again"; Transliteration: "Mata Issho ni" (Japanese: また一緒に)	Yūya Horiuchi	Yuka Yamada	Yūya Horiuchi	February 4, 2022
6	"Difficult Is Fun"; Transliteration: "'Muzukashii' ga Tanoshii" (Japanese: 「難しい」が楽しい)	Masato Uchibori	Keiichirō Ōchi	Takumi Shibata	February 11, 2022
7	"Wedding"; Transliteration: "Kekkonshiki" (Japanese: 結婚式)	Naoki Horiuchi	Yuka Yamada	Kazuhisa Takenouchi	February 18, 2022
8	"I'm Fine Right Here"; Transliteration: "Koko ga Ii" (Japanese: ここがいい)	Yūsuke Tomita	Keiichirō Ōchi	Royden B	February 25, 2022
9	"I Wanna Go on a Fishing and Camping Trip!!"; Transliteration: "Tsuri Kyanpu Shitai!!" (Japanese: 釣りキャンプしたい！！)	Kōsaku Taniguchi	Keiichirō Ōchi	Kazuhisa Takenouchi	March 4, 2022
10	"I'll Do My Best, Too"; Transliteration: "Watashi mo Ganbarimasu ne" (Japanese: 私もがんばりますねっ)	Geisei Morita	Keiichirō Ōchi	Royden B	March 11, 2022
11	"Those Important to Me"; Transliteration: "Taisetsu na Mono" (Japanese: 大切なもの)	Yoshinobu Kasai	Yuka Yamada	Takumi Shibata	March 18, 2022
12	"Let's Pick Some Out Together"; Transliteration: "Futari de Erabō" (Japanese: 二人で選ぼうっ)	Yūsuke Tomita, Geisei Morita, Noriaki Akitaya	Yuka Yamada	Noriaki Akitaya	March 25, 2022

== Reception ==
In 2020, the manga was one of the 50 nominees for the 6th Next Manga Awards in the print category.
