= Oninagi =

Japanese manga series

- Cover of Oninagi first volume as published by Houbunsha

オニナギ
- Genre: Action, Comedy, Supernatural
- Manga
- Written by: Akira Ishida
- Published by: Houbunsha
- English publisher: NA: Yen Press
- Magazine: Manga Time Kirara Forward
- Original run: 2007 – 2010
- Volumes: 4

Oninagi (Japanese: オニナギ) is a Japanese manga written by Akira Ishida. It was originally published in Japan in 2007 by Houbunsha. It was announced at Yen Press' Comic-Con International panel in July 2008 that they acquired Oninagi for release in North America. The first volume was translated and published in April 2009. Akira Ishida is not to be confused with the voice actor of the same name.

== Plot ==
The story begins with Nanami Kushimiya, an average 15-year-old schoolgirl excited about starting the new school year in hopes of getting closer to her crush, Kazuto Sanjouin. On her way to school, she is confronted by a demon-slaying swordswoman, Tomotaka Onigoroshi, who claims that Nanami is a demon and vows to slay her then and there. When Nanami doesn't reveal a "true" form on the verge of being slain by Tomotaka's blade, Onigani, she believes she may have been wrong about her initial instincts. However, when they are attacked by a nearby tree demon, a mysterious supernatural power emerges from Nanami and she manages to defeat the demon by incinerating it completely.

The unconscious Nanami is taken back to her home by Tomotaka, and once she awakens, she and Tomotaka learn from her grandfather that her powers may have something to do with their family ancestry. In the distant past, one of their ancestors, a demon slayer, ended up marrying the powerful but beautiful demon he was ordered to slay. As a result, the demon lost her demonic powers and became a human woman, and it is believed that those powers may have somehow been passed down to her. With this revelation, Tomotaka decides that she will observe Nanami until she can understand her powers better, and if they prove to be dangerous, she will kill her.

== Characters ==
Nanami Kushimiya

A seemingly average schoolgirl, she learns after her encounters with Tomotaka and a tree demon that may possess demonic powers from her ancestors. She initially believes these claims to be crazy at first, but as more individuals come after her because of this power, she learns to accept this truth. Yet despite this knowledge, she still goes about living her life as a normal girl as best as she can.

Tomotaka Onigoroshi

The fifteenth generation heir to the Onigoroshi house and a member of the Divine Enforcers. She wields the sword Onigani, a powerful tool that resonates whenever it's around demonic taint and creates a powerful aura that can be used to destroy demons. She claims to have never been wrong about her instincts concerning demons. She is very serious about her duties and very possessive of her targets, to the point where she'll even attack her allies if it means slaying her quarry.

Kazuto Sanjouin

Chairman of the Regulatory Committee at the school, he is Nanami's crush since Junior High. However, he is also revealed to be a member of the Divine Enforces. He is a magic-wielder, able to make small needles by gathering demonic taint. With these, he is able to attack, lay barriers, and even purify those affected by taint in small doses. He generally appears to be very polite, well-mannered individual.

Aki-Chan

Nanami's best friend at school. She is the one that tries to convince Nanami to tell Sanjouin how she feels about him.

Tsurugi, Kusabi, and Mori

A group of demonic servants created by Princess Kinkan over 400 years ago. These creatures cannot exist without Kinkan, but while she did not die, they felt a large dip in her powers. So they decided to go into hibernation until they sensed her presence again. Now in the present, they come to Nanami's aid while under attack and pledge their loyalty to her, sensing Kinkan's presence within her. Each one can morph parts of their bodies into a weapon. In fact, their names represent that type of weapon they wield; Tsurugi (sword), Kusabi (wedge), and Mori (lance).

Hanged Man

A selfish demon who went chasing after the power within Nanami behind the backs of his comrades once alerted of its presence. His abilities include being able to control hordes of demonic spiders from a far distance. His demonic form is that of a giant Tsuchigumo.

== Volumes ==
No.	Original release date	Original ISBN	English release date	English ISBN
1	September 27, 2007	978-4-8322-7656-7	April 2009	978-0-7595-3034-8
2	May 27, 2008	978-4-8322-7702-1	January 2010	978-0-316-08114-6
3	February 12, 2009	978-4-8322-7776-2	May 2010	978-0-316-08119-1
4	May 12, 2010	978-4-8322-7910-0	October 2014	978-0-316-33611-6

== Reception ==
The manga has received a fair amount of praise and criticism amongst its reviewers. Joy Kim of Mangalife.com criticized Volume 1 for being a book that is "basically supernatural action by the numbers", and that "The story also suffers from a somewhat scattered focus". Matthew Alexander of Mania.com also remarked on the book's lack of unique elements, but felt that "there is a large enough cast of characters from enough camps to make the story interesting". He also added that it would "really only be of interest to fans of occult stories". Tiamat's Manga Reviews enjoyed the characters from the very start and praised the author, stating "Ishida's writing style is great, he manages to keep the reader wondering about the characters and organisations involved". Overall they felt that Volume 1 was "both an amazing volume, but also a terrible one".
