= Tonari no Kashiwagi-san =

Manga series created by Shimotsuki Kinusa

- Cover of Tonari no Kashiwagi-san volume 1 by Hōbunsha featuring the characters Kotone and Yūto (the chibi)

となりの柏木さん
- Genre: Comedy, Romance, Slice of Life
- Manga
- Written by: Kinusa Shimotsuki
- Published by: Hōbunsha
- Magazine: Manga Time Kirara Forward
- Original run: September 24, 2009 – August 24, 2016
- Volumes: 12

Tonari no Kashiwagi-san (となりの柏木さん; lit. "Next to Kashiwagi") is a Japanese manga series by Kinusa Shimotsuki, serialized in Hōbunsha's seinen manga magazine Manga Time Kirara Forward from September 2009 to August 2016. It has been collected in twelve tankōbon volumes as of September 2016.

== Plot ==
The series follows the life of Yuto Sakuraba, a high school boy who is open about his otaku lifestyle, much to the dismay of his classmates. He works at a shop called Anime Haven. He fawns over an online artist named Sayane because of her moe-styled drawings. At the beginning of the school year, he is assigned a seat next to Kotone Kashiwagi, a popular girl who is known to strongly dislike otaku culture. However, when he discovers that Kotone actually does like anime and manga, they begin a friendship where they discuss their passion in secret. However, Kotone has another secret: she is actually the artist Sayane. When Yuto eventually makes that connection, he must figure out how it will affect their friendship. Meanwhile, Yuto and Kotone's best friends try to encourage them to advance their relationship together, while ending up coupling themselves.

== Characters ==
Yūto Sakuraba (桜庭 雄斗, Sakuraba Yūto)
Voiced by: Tetsuya Kakihara
The Male Protagonist, openly otaku and unpopular. He's a gentle boy who can be attentive, but also unable to read the mood at times. He discovers Kotone's secret but promises to not tell anyone, thus becoming friends with her. He later realizes he has a crush on Kotone, but tries to take it on his own pace. He's fan of an anime series called "Gadget Maid" (ガジェット☆メイド, Gajetto Meido). He also works at the anime shop Anime Haven.
Kotone Kashiwagi (柏木 琴子, Kashiwagi Kotone)
Voiced by: Ayahi Takagaki
The heroine of the series is a timid otaku who is afraid of revealing herself. She's attractive and popular. She usually shows herself as someone who hates Otaku culture, but will reveal her true side to those she trusts. After Yūto discovers she's actually an Otaku, he promises to keep her secret and they become friends. She regularly posts art on a message board under the pseudonym of Sayane. She dislikes being mistaken for a fujoshi. Like Yūto, she's a fan of Gadget Maid.
Sayaka Fukuda (福田 清花, Fukuda Sayaka)
Voiced by: Yuka Iguchi
Kotone's best friend and her self-proclaimed No. #1 fan. She has been a friend of Kotone ever since childhood, and is very protective of her, often smiling and acting friendly on the surface, but hiding her own feelings about this. Kazuki falls in love with Sayaka and confesses to her despite her initial refusal to be involved, but they become a couple. Kotone and Yūto think Sayaka is a bit of a tsundere.
Kazuki Kusano (草野 和樹, Kusano Kazuki)
Voiced by: Toshiki Masuda
Yūto's best friend. He is not an otaku, but is very popular. He has a crush on Sayaka, ever since he saw her cry during the School Entrance Ceremony. Later, they both start dating.
Kotori Abekawa (安倍川 琴理, Abekawa Kotori)
Voiced by: Eriko Matsui
Kotori manages the Anime Heaven shop where Yūto works. It is later revealed that she is Kotone's older sister. She is 32 years old and is married, and has a short stature and youthful appearance.
Takuya Abekawa (安倍川 拓也, Abekawa Takuya)
Kotori's husband and Kotone's brother-in-law. He's a company employee. He is called "Taku-chan" by Kotori. He's 26 years old. Like Yūto, he's a fan of Gadget Maid.
Christina Müller (クリスティーナ ミュラー, Kurisutīna Myurā)
She is an exchange student from Germany who transferred to Yūto's class. She loves otaku culture and becomes friends with Yuto. She has a boyfriend in Japan, and moved there so she could meet him in real life. She is nicknamed "Tina" (ティナ, Tīna).
Kōtarō Sasayama (笹山 孝太郎, Sasayama Kōtarō)
Tina's boyfriend.

== Media ==
=== Manga ===
The manga started serialization in the December 2009 issue of "Manga Time Kirara Forward", published by Hōbunsha, ending in the . As of September 2014, 12 volumes have already been published. The chapters are all unnamed, so they're known only by their number.

No.	Title	Release date	ISBN
1	Tonari no Kashiwagi-san 1 (となりの柏木さん 1)	April 12, 2010	978-4-8322-7904-9
Chapters 1-7
2	Tonari no Kashiwagi-san 2 (となりの柏木さん 2)	November 12, 2010	978-4-8322-7959-9
Chapters 8-14
3	Tonari no Kashiwagi-san 3 (となりの柏木さん 3)	June 13, 2011	978-4-8322-4034-6
Chapters 15-21
4	Tonari no Kashiwagi-san 4 (となりの柏木さん 4)	February 13, 2012	978-4-8322-4109-1
Chapters 22-28
5	Tonari no Kashiwagi-san 5 (となりの柏木さん 5)	September 12, 2012	978-4-8322-4191-6
Chapters 29-35
6	Tonari no Kashiwagi-san 6 (となりの柏木さん 6)	May 11, 2013	978-4-8322-4295-1
Chapters 36-42
7	Tonari no Kashiwagi-san 7 (となりの柏木さん 7)	December 12, 2013	978-4-8322-4377-4
Chapters 43-49
8	Tonari no Kashiwagi-san 8 (となりの柏木さん 8)	July 11, 2014	978-4-8322-4460-3
Chapters 50-56
9	Tonari no Kashiwagi-san 9 (となりの柏木さん 9)	February 12, 2015	978-4-8322-4460-3
Chapters 57-63
10	Tonari no Kashiwagi-san 10 (となりの柏木さん 10)	February 12, 2015	978-4-8322-4613-3
Chapters 64-70
11	Tonari no Kashiwagi-san 11 (となりの柏木さん 11)	March 12, 2016	978-4-8322-4672-0
Chapters 71-77
12	Tonari no Kashiwagi-san 12 (となりの柏木さん 12)	September 12, 2016	978-4-8322-4741-3
Chapters 78-84

=== Motion Comic ===
A motion comic, or Manga 2.5, was produced. It ran for 11 episodes.
