= Bullet Girls =

2014 video game

- Japanese box art, featuring (outer circle, left to right) Yurina, Tsukiyo, Aki, Mai, Minagi, Saki and Remi; with Aya in the center
- Developer: Shade
- Publisher: D3 Publisher
- Composer: Masanori Hikichi
- Platform: PlayStation Vita
- Release: JP: August 21, 2014
- Genre: Third-person shooter
- Mode: Single-player

Bullet Girls (バレットガールズ, Baretto Gāruzu) is a third-person shooter video game for the PlayStation Vita developed by Shade and published by D3 Publisher. The game is an action shooter video game, and has been compared to paintball by Gematsu and Senran Kagura by Siliconera. Bullet Girls takes place in a school that serves upper class girls, and focuses on the Ranger Club, whose members undertake military missions in their spare time. Noted for its ample amounts of ecchi and fanservice content, Bullet Girls game was released on August 21, 2014, in Japan. A sequel, titled Bullet Girls 2, was released on April 21, 2016. A third game, titled Bullet Girls Phantasia for PS4 and PS Vita was released in August 2018 and for PC through Steam on Jan 16, 2020.

== Gameplay ==
Bullet Girls revolves around a group of high school girls who are part of their school's Ranger Club, alternately known as the Ranger Corps, which trains them on using weapons and different types of military missions used on battlefields. There are a variety of missions within the game ranging from offensive to defensive, each with a variety of objectives, which include wiping out enemy forces, reaching a specific point on the map, collecting items and teaming up with other club members who will then engage in combat with the player. A wide range of weapons are usable, including handguns, rifles, recoil-less rifles, and shotguns, among others. Characters can hold up to four different weapons, which can be exchanged during missions. Military vehicles, such as tanks, armoured vehicles, and helicopters can be found in the game as well. Many game maps feature in Bullet Girls, ranging from the schoolyard to the desert.

A notable gameplay mechanic of Bullet Girls is clothes degradation. As the girls take hits and lose health points, their clothing gets torn up thus revealing what they are wearing underneath. Specific parts of the girls' clothing can be targeted to reveal that specific area; additionally, to help complement this feature, the game contains "a slew of cut-in images, as well as 39 unique bits of erotic acting meant to play up the sexual aspects of the game." The game also features "interrogation training scenes", used to "extract critical information from the opposing side", but is mostly just touching and groping the girls. There are over 1,600 patterns of undergarments for the girls; these can be customised by the player. Points acquired from the interrogation practices as well as the missions as can be exchanged for additional costumes and undergarments in the in-game shop. Settings within the game can also be customised, ranging from camera angle to the costume destruction scenes, as well as dirt that shows up on the characters. The game also features downloadable content, such as additional items, characters and extra voices, including special costumes from the Onechanbara video game series.

== Story ==
=== Plot ===
Bullet Girls is set in Misakimori Academy, a girls-only private high school founded 149 years ago somewhere in Japan. Founded on the principles of duty and self-refinement, the academy features numerous school clubs which allow students to practice defensive military techniques, and every student is obliged to join. The game's story begins on the first day after students have officially become club members, thus starting the adventures of the Ranger Clubs and their activities.

=== Characters ===
- Aya Hinomoto (火乃本 彩) (voiced by M.A.O), a happy-go-lucky girl who takes everything in stride and always gives her all. She aspired to join the First Aid Club, but accidentally joined the Ranger Club after misaddressing her application and her advisor forced her to stay. However, over time, she finds herself charmed by the other club members.
- Yurina Kanezono (金園 優理奈) (voiced by Aya Uchida), a mysterious girl who is somewhat smart but also a bit of an airhead. Yurina isn't always the quickest of thinkers but occasionally demonstrates aptitude. Outside of school, she lives with her older brother and is a talented cook.
- Remi Kishino (木住野 玲美) (voiced by Kaori Fukuhara), an extremely energetic girl who is considered to be a mood maker of sorts for those in the Ranger Club, due to being easily excitable and having unmatched levels of energy. She is also known for being out of control when something sets off her temper.
- Tsukiyo Takanashi (高梨 月代) (voiced by Sachika Misawa), a tsundere-type of girl who often creeps behind other club members and is not unlike a ninja, being quick on her feet. She has a habit of squeezing the chests of the other girls.
- Saki Amamine (天峰 咲姫) (voiced by Aya Suzaki), an immature girl who considers herself highly. She has a habit of penchant of not showing up to Ranger Club meetings when they don't suit her, much to the annoyance of other members, and often sulks around as if she's still in middle school. However, once she sets her eyes on something, there's no stopping her until she gets what she wants.
- Minagi Kamishiro (神代 海凪) (voiced by Emi Uema), a "samurai warrior at heart" who has traded her blade for a gun. Minagi is a tactician within the Ranger Club with a strong independent streak and a cool and collected demeanor. She sometimes expresses her feelings in the form of haikus.
- Aki Saotome (早乙女 陽希) (voiced by Asami Tano), a dashing young woman who has managed to court her own horde of fans at school. She is the vice president of the Ranger Club, though often stands in as interim president due to the actual president often being absent. Aki grew up hearing war stories told from her grandmother and is interested in all things military.
- Mai Doiuchi (土居内 麻衣) (voiced by Yuiko Tatsumi), the president of the Ranger Club. She is the daughter of a famous family and holds her looks in high regard, considering them to be a cut above those of her fellow high schoolers. She is routinely absent from club activities due to official activities, but is a hard worker.
- Meika Hoshikawa (星川 冥香) (voiced by Yui Makino), a supporting character and advisor to the Ranger Club. She is a graduate from the academy, and despite being a bit careless was considered to be one of the top members in her time.
- Rumi Yukishiro (雪城 瑠水) (voiced by Muta Minami), a supporting character and manager of the in-game shop that handles equipment necessary for club activities. She is polite and considered to be a trustworthy and reliable young girl.

== Development ==
The game was announced by D3 Publisher in a May edition of Famitsu. Bullet Girls features a variety of voice talent, which include Aya Suzaki, Aya Uchida, Kaori Fukuhara, and Sachika Misawa, who also provided voices for characters in Devil Survivor 2, Ace Attorney, and Akiba's Trip: Undead & Undressed. A rock theme song and accompanying music video, as well as a trailer for the game, were released to help promote Bullet Girls. Players who preorder the game receive a bonus character costume, with the costume depending on which retailer the player orders at. The game's release date was originally set at August 28, 2014; however, this has since been changed to one week earlier at August 21, 2014.

== Reception ==
Four Famitsu reviewers gave Bullet Girls scores of 8, 8, 7 and 7, for a total score of 30/40. The game sold 29,690 physical retail copies within the debut release week in Japan, placing third place amongst all software sales in Japan for that week.
