= Dream Eater Merry =

Japanese manga series

- First volume cover, featuring Merry Nightmare

夢喰いメリー (Yumekui Merī)
- Genre: Action, fantasy
- Manga
- Written by: Yoshitaka Ushiki
- Published by: Houbunsha
- Magazine: Manga Time Kirara Forward
- Original run: March 24, 2008 – November 24, 2020
- Volumes: 24
- Anime television series
- Directed by: Shigeyasu Yamauchi
- Produced by: Hideki Shirane
- Written by: Yoshitaka Ushiki
- Music by: Keiichi Oku
- Studio: J.C.Staff
- Licensed by: AUS: Hanabee; NA: Sentai Filmworks; UK: MVM Films
- Original network: TBS, MBS, CBC, BS-TBS, RKK
- Original run: January 7, 2011 – April 8, 2011
- Episodes: 13

Dream Eater Merry (夢喰いメリー, Yumekui Merī) is a Japanese manga series written and illustrated by Yoshitaka Ushiki. The series was serialized in Houbunsha's seinen manga magazine Manga Time Kirara Forward from 2008 to 2020. An anime television series by J.C.Staff which aired in 2011.

== Plot ==
Yumeji Fujiwara is a young male student like any other who, after an event that occurred 10 years previously, gained the power to see the aura of other people's dreams, and the ability to predict what kind of dream they will have next. Since then, he has started to have strange dreams of cats following him for an unknown reason. The boss of the cat army, John Doe, tells him that his body is needed to access the real world. One day, a mysterious girl falls on top of him as he is returning home from his errands. This girl, named Merry Nightmare, is a dream demon (夢魔, muma), searching for a way to return to her world. Yumeji decides to help her, and a gate to the world of dreams opens again, this time in full daylight. She appears in the daydream world looking for an answer on how to get back to her world. Meanwhile, an evil dream demon named Pharos Hercules is leading other dream demons to make humans into their vessels to raise an army, killing those that oppose him which causes humans to lose sight of their goals and ambitions. Yumeji eventually becomes Merry's partner, using his ability to scout out dream demons so Merry can hunt them.

After Hercules' downfall, Merry's quest to return to the dream world continues. In the meantime, a mysterious boy named Kyou Shiragi transfers to Yumeji's class, where dream demons are suddenly manifesting; as a result of their losses, they cause humans to accomplish their goals instead of destroying them. With dream demons seen by previous vessels, Yumeji and Merry now must investigate this unusual phenomenon and restore balance. It is revealed that Yumeji and Merry met 10 years previously when an incident occurred in the dream world. During the school cultural festival, a powerful dream demon in the form of Kyou and his minions attempts to disturb the balance of both worlds. The pair and their companions fight together to send the adversaries back through the doorway, repairing it, and everything the dream demons have touched becomes undone. Knowing they will forget each other, Merry bids Yumeji farewell with a kiss. Sometime later, Yumeji and his friends still remember Merry and others by heart, and Yumeji starts writing a book based on their recounted adventures.

== Characters ==
=== Main characters ===
Merry Nightmare (メリー・ナイトメア, Merī Naitomea)
Voiced by: Ayane Sakura (Japanese); Hilary Haag (English)
A dream demon from the dreamworld, who allegedly came into the real world 10 years ago without any memory. Unlike the other dream demons, she does not need to possess a human to enter the real world, as she has her own body. Searching for a door to return to the dream world, she falls onto Yumeji one day, who wants to help her find her way back home. At first reluctant, when a daydream occurs and she saves Yumeji's life, she accepts his help. Merry can break the daydreams to get back into the real world. When Yumeji got supposedly stabbed by Hercules she remarks that she "doesn't need a world without Yumeji anymore". She also reacted the worst out of everyone by displaying the violent strength of her Gate Keeper power, showing how much he means to her.
She cannot eat spicy food or drink carbonated soda, but she loves doughnuts above everything and likes video games a lot. She currently works at the Tachibana restaurant. Merry's distinct features include horizontal slit-shaped pupils similar to that of sheep and a scar on her right arm, in the same place where Yumeji used to have his. Her name is derived from the rhyme "Mary had a little lamb".
Her other name, given by Yumeji is Dream Eater (夢喰い, Yumekui), while her real other name is "Gate Keeper" (Sheep) (門番 (シープ), Monban (Shiipu)) because she has the dream demon in charge of guarding the gate between dream and reality. Merry possesses a keychain that, when it touches a dream demon, forces the dream demon back to the dream world without harming the vessel's dream. The keychain has been shown to have its key detach and summon the Gate itself. Merry finally recovers her full strength when touching a hero's mask belonging to Yumeji ten years previously. She and Yumeji shared a body to seek excitement in the real world until an accident with Isana in a playground scarred their arms and forcibly separated them. Once the truth is finally revealed in Merry's irresponsibility she and kid Yumeji were caught in collusion against Rem who threw them in a vortex sending them to the real world from distance losing all memory of the events but promising to find each other.
As the door between the real and dream world is fixed, Merry consoles Yumeji on how their meeting became an adventure in a story, even though she claims that all humanity will forget the existence of dream demons, Yumeji strongly suggests that he'll do his best to remember, and Merry surprises him with a kiss, before disappearing back home.
Yumeji Fujiwara (藤原 夢路, Fujiwara Yumeji)
Voiced by: Nobuhiko Okamoto (Japanese); Blake Shepard (English)
Yumeji has the ability to look at a colored aura of people and then be able to predict what dreams they are going to have. Though his normal predictions are hazy at best, he can clearly identify when someone is destined to have a nightmare. When he looks in the mirror with that ability, he sees the colors for nightmares, and indeed, in the opening episode, he has a recurring nightmare where he is being hunted down by a gang of cats. He is a lazy, yet strong-willed and determined person with a heart of gold, who is always ready to help others. He is also a member of a writing club at his high school and is a big fan of the superhero called Guricho. Information about his family and past is unknown, but it has been said that his parents are away due to work, and is currently under the care of Isana's family until they get back. He had a scar in the same place as one Merry has on her arm, although this is not alluded to in the anime. Yumeji also has the ability to use what he calls "Lucid Gadget"; his right eye changes into the pupil of previous dream demons and he is able to mimic their signature abilities. It has recently been revealed that Yumeji is not fully human and has the same energy source as Hercules, which is why he is immortal in the dream world. In Kyou's arc, Yumeji gains a newfound ability "vessel transfer" that allows him to temporarily acquire a dream demon from another to make use of their aspects but gets a case of insomnia as the cost of energy.
Yumeji and Merry have known each other before when they were children. 10 years ago, a kid Yumeji somehow found himself in the dream world meeting Merry. As he comes to visit her daily she notices a key had been misplaced in the stockpile collection that accesses the labyrinth doors. To ease her frustration, Yumeji ventures into the dream world her in circles running into the same odd door. Violently the law of opening someone else's door, the right arms of Yumeji and the newly born Rem got swapped, making Yumeji ineffective to other dream demons. He and Merry then fell into a vortex back in the real world with no memory of the events. Yumeji and Kyou eventually have their dormant arms returned when fighting a decisive battle at the dream world's gateway. Before becoming a normal human again, Yumeji uses the last of his powers to share doughnuts with Merry when they part ways. He aspires to write a novel based on his lost memories of dream demons, titled "Yumekui Merry."
Isana Tachibana (橘 勇魚, Tachibana Isana)
Voiced by: Ai Kayano (Japanese); Brittney Karbowski (English)
Isana is Yumeji's childhood friend, whom Yumeji has been living with for a while. Daughter of the cook of a restaurant in the city, she is a kind and quite shy girl who works with her father. Yumeji saved her as she was about to fall from a playground when she was young. She also commented once that she had a feeling that she had met Merry before but shook the idea off as her imagination. She is in love with Yumeji and asks Merry what kind of feelings she has for him. Her dream is to be an artist. When first seeing Merry, Isana speculates that Merry and Yumeji somehow resemble each other. After being targeted by Legion, Yumeji and Merry tell her the truth about dream demons. Confused that Kyou claims he saved Isana from falling in her youth (technically he meant Yumeji's right arm that he currently possesses), she comes to a realization that as children it was actually both Yumeji and Merry who saved her before upon showing they share the same scar on the arms.
On their date on Christmas Eve, with covert encouragement from Merry, Isana tries to confess her love to Yumeji but is interrupted. Yumeji tells Isana that he likes her and asks her to illustrate his novel, to which she happily agrees.
Yui Kounagi (光凪 由衣, Kōnagi Yui)
Voiced by: Tomoko Akiya (Japanese); Luci Christian (English)
Yui is a young girl whom Yumeji meets in a supermarket. She goes to an all-girls school. She has a strong interest in collecting dolls and keychains, particularly unique-looking ones, and she is a terrible cook. She is always determined to help others however she can, and has a habit of wanting to be acknowledged as a superior. It is this trait that leads her to become the voluntary vessel of another dream demon, Engi Threepiece, after she decides to help her. Yui has a sister-like relationship with Engi, soothing her whenever she feels her deep sadness towards losing her older sister. It is shown Yui works part-time assisting her grandfather, who is a doctor when Yumeji went to have his ankle healed. She also seems to have shown affection towards Yumeji when they first met. Regardless of everyone's memories alternated Yui remains friends with Yumeji, Isana, and others.
"Garden" Engi Threepiece (「双月花 (ガーデン)」エンギ・スリーピース, Ga-den Engi Surīpīsu)
Voiced by: Aya Endō (Japanese); Shannon Emerick (English)
Engi is an angel-like dream demon with an aggressive manner yet very apologetic. Her daydream is a field of prairies that contains a moon. She can multiply swords and launch them towards her enemies. She wants to avenge her older sister, Patti, who was tricked into going to the real world and ended up being killed there. Engi thus asked Yui's help to become her vessel in order to search for Pharaos Hercules, whom she believes is responsible for Patti's death. Although she can only physically appear during daydreams, she can possess Yui's body in order to speak with others. When Engi first encounters Merry thinking she was a threat Yumeji defends her. Later after settling their differences, Engi and Yui join forces with Yumeji and Merry in their battles with dream demons. Due to Engi's fuzzy purple collar, she is often nicknamed "Nasu-onna" (meaning "Eggplant-lady") by Merry. Upon Hercules' defeat, Engi recommends Merry to send her back home instead she orders Engi to remain in the human world until the true foe, Rem, is vanquished. Engi soon learns to manifest her sword and powers while possessing Yui's body. Once the war at school was resolved, Engi bids farewell to her "little big sister", Yui.
Her name, Threepiece is an allusion to the story about good things to see during your first dream during the new year. First is Mount Fuji, second is a hawk, and the third is eggplant. "Engi" means Pratītyasamutpāda, which is also the origin of her sister's name.
"Chaser" John Doe (「追跡者(チェイサー)」 ジョン・ドゥ, Cheisā Jon Du)
Voiced by: Jōji Nakata (Japanese); Christopher Ayres (English)
A cat-like dream demon with a skull mask who leads the cat army that appears in Yumeji's dreams. He was originally interested in taking over Yumeji's body in order to stay in the real world, but Merry fought and defeated him. He also wields a guillotine-like weapon. His daydream is a run-down village with fish skeletons, and an army of cats including human-like female cats that seem fond of Yumeji. After Yumeji's confrontation with Engi, John returns and heals the wounds on Yumeji's soul. John informs Yumeji about Pharos Hercules and that Hercules supposedly is responsible for Merry manifesting in the real world without a vessel, later revealed to be false. When asked if whether he was an enemy or an ally, John responded that he was only collecting information, however, he is "an ally of truth". John occasionally helps Yumeji realize his potential to manipulate daydreams, such as manifesting weapons and connecting dream gardens together. He later uses a black cat as his vessel which stays at Yumeji's house, though becomes curious about how Yumeji is able to enter daydreams without him, wondering if he is even human. When inhabiting the first shot at Yumeji's body in action, John discerns what he really is. The balance was restored when the Dream Eater pair overcome Rem, therefore, satisfying John that Yumeji has found the <truth>.

=== Antagonists ===
"Pharos" Hercules (「灯台 (ファロス)」 エルクレス, Farosu Erukuresu)
Voiced by: Kenta Miyake (Japanese); David Matranga (English)
The main antagonist, a dream demon who looks like a knight wearing armor and a helmet. During Hercules' fight with Engi he uses an oversized ax and demonstrates the ability to take over dream worlds. His human vessel is Takateru and his daydream is a landscape with chimney rocks. Eventually, it is revealed that he and Yumeji are referring to as "brothers" because they "share the same blood" received from Kyou, explaining their similar abilities, in addition to his firepower. He has the goal to eliminate the Gate that separates reality from the Dream World so that dream demons can roam Earth without the need for vessels, and is attempting to possess humanity. In the final showdown, it turns out Hercules had nothing to do with Merry being in the real world. Hercules loses his power after an impact of Yumeji and Merry's combined power and appears before the Gate in front of a mysterious naked figure (Rem), the true antagonist who granted him power.
His second name means "lighthouse", whose light crosses the boundary of the dream and gathers other dream demons around him.
"Loneliness" Ichima (「孤独」, Ichima)
Voiced by: Yuka Iguchi (Japanese); Maggie Flecknoe (English)
A solitary long black hair dream demon in a white hakama with the sleeves woven together. She speaks in a calm dark demeanor yet gets mad easily. She summons stone pillars on her opponents. Her attempts to have Minato Kisaragi, a clumsy little girl, as her vessel forbidding her from making any other friends, until Merry sends her away. During Kyou's assault, Ichima mysteriously returns. Although Minato barely recognizes her, Ichima is only seen by former vessels and seemingly wants to reconcile with Minato. Ichima bids farewell to Minato as a real friend when she had to leave home.
"Maze" Landsborough (「迷路 (メイズ)」 ランズボロー, Meizu Ranzuborō)
Voiced by: Hiroyuki Yoshino (Japanese); Greg Ayres (English)
A clown-like dream demon in service of Hercules who possesses a young man named Ken, who dreams to be a linguist, as his vessel. His daydream is a huge circus-like maze, and he constantly uses his wily words to psyche out his opponents. Merry sends him and Noir back to the dream world, claiming that they will not be able to return.
"Chain" Noir (「縛鎖 (チェイン)」 ノワール, Chein Nowāru)
A buxom dream demon serving under Hercules, who uses chains to trap her enemies. She uses Ken's little sister Hina as her vessel. Noir, along with Landsborough, attacks Merry and Yumeji, however, she is defeated after Yumeji takes over her dream world, with John's alliance. Merry sends her and Landsborough back to the dream world, claiming that they will not be able to return since she can place a 'lock' on their exclusive pathway to the real world.
"Familia" Legion (「影同心 (ファミリア)」 レギオン, Famiria Region)
A spectral dream demon that has several shadows. If his main body is able to acquire its desired vessels, its shadows can possess many other vessels who have experienced the same nightmare. He also has the ability to manipulate gravity by rotating his face. Legion targets approximately 67 students in Yumeji's school, chasing Isana to make her his main vessel. Merry manages to send it back thanks to the cooperation of Yumeji and the other classmates.
"Maestro" Aeolian and Ionian Achtelnote (「マエストロ」 エオリアとイオニア)
A pair of dream demons that have a very classic fashion, somewhat resembling two music conductors. For the most part, the twins are very oblivious and whenever someone spoke a noise they react stating that they cannot stand a sound by almost anything but themselves. They use musical notes to attack their enemies, and often invade Nao's dream to steal her as their shared vessel for both at once. Engi goes full impact at them for irritating her sister. She and Merry manage to send them away locked. They somehow got back because of Kyou's actions and demand a rematch then again were swallowed by the Armillaria Sisters.
"Ice Wall" Hrimthurs (「氷の壁」フリームスルス)
An abominable snow monster-like dream demon. He attacks with four arms and creates ice shards. First had Minato, Hina, and Ken are on the run when a repentant Ichima unsuccessfully subdues Hrimthurs. Merry and Yumeji come to the rescue; avoid getting eaten alive as frozen foods. John-Yumeji overwhelms Hrimthurs, only then does Jayce disposes of him as a worthless coward.
"Function" Jayce (「関数」ジェイス)
A bat-like dream demon who wields twin knives that envision how elegant the human world is. He can detect movements by sound waves. Summoned by Kyou as his ideal nightmare leaves he is jealous of the Dream Eater pair. Jayce intends to kill them alone to gain fame from Kyou. Unlike Elder, Jayce came of his own ambition other than his previous guidance. The moment both he and Elder are swallowed in the gateway, Jayce mortally stabs Yumeji.
"Tree" Sequoia Elder (「ツリー」セコイア長老)
An old man-like dream demon. Very talkative and manipulates plant life to his will. Yumeji pushes his limits in a violent battle against Elder. As Merry's full capacities overpower him and Jayce, Elder is reminded of what a gentleman he was before being sent back to the dream world.
"Colony" Armillaria Sisters (「コロニー」アルミラリア姉妹)
Maid-like dream demons of triplets sisters filled with enthusiasm to whoever can break the ties of reality. "Bedding" Yae is Kyou's self-proclaimed god servant and regularly serves him tea out of the blue, and her tea can also be lethal and contains painful particles. "Stalk" Mana uses manipulative means to subdue her preys with a poisonous perfume that imposes hallucination. "Umbrella" Riko arms with an umbrella as her armament; she barricades the school grounds with enormous size mushrooms flourishing. The triplets take the initiative on the "Empty", swarm of motionless beings racket the cultural festival crowd to feed on the humans' ideals that the Dream Eater pair and Isana must resolve. Regalecus and John's cat retainers defend against the triplets.
Kyou Shiragi (白儀 響, Shiragi Kyō)
A boy and true mastermind who transferred into Yumeji's class. Kyou is very excited to find out that Isana is in the same class as him, as he feels gratitude towards her for helping him out. He appears to have extreme luck and excels in both sports and academics. He may have the power to draw out and transfer dream demons without notice; make multiple summonses not seen by ordinary humans. Kyou has a mysterious connection with Yumeji and Merry; showing he bears a scar on his arm too. Later revealed that Kyou is currently a non-vessel dream demon-like Merry. In actuality he is an incarnate form of his real self, Rem, compiling pieces of cracks through the gateway and bearing the bulk of Yumeji's influence that resulted from Isana's accident ten years ago. Rem, the manifestation of the dream world itself, became intertwined with Yumeji. His goal is to "mix" the dream world with reality so humans can achieve their dreams without any hardship, which the protagonists know that is against potiental development. During the outbreak at school, Kyou started to think for himself rather than just being an avatar. Rem was overpowered by Yumeji and he is finally put to rest.

=== Writing Club ===
Takateru Akiyanagi (秋柳 貴照, Akiyanagi Takateru)
Voiced by: Shinnosuke Tachibana (Japanese); Christopher Patton (English)
Takateru "Taka" is a best friend of Yumeji, and a member of the writing club. He loves writing haiku and is often seen with a pen and a piece of paper to write on it. He has a younger sister, Mizuki, who inspired him to write haiku. It is soon revealed that he is in fact the vessel of Hercules. Yumeji at first felt accused of not being able to prevent Takateru from being possessed by Hercules but is determined to save him.
Saki Kirishima (霧島 咲, Kirishima Saki)
Voiced by: Mariya Ise (Japanese); Shelley Calene-Black (English)
Saki is another friend of Yumeji, and a member of the writing club. Quite tomboyish, she is fascinated by Yumeji's ability to see the aura of dreams. It is hinted she may have feelings for Takateru.
Mei Hoshino (星野 鳴, Hoshino Mei)
Voiced by: Natsumi Takamori (Japanese); Emily Neves (English)
Mei is the leader of the writing club and a friend of Yumeji. A kind and soft-spoken girl with green hair and glasses, and she ends up being the vessel of a priest-like dream demon called "Lovers" Chris Evergreen. Chris, while taking over Mei's body, sent messages to Mei through a second cell phone that was in Mei's bag. When Chris was about to disappear back to the dream world by Merry, Mei wakes up and realizes that he was her secret admirer. He tells Mei that he is only a nightmare causing her pain, but she slaps him and tells him that she loves him. Mei is inspired by Chris to be a novelist for romance.

=== All-girls' school ===
Nao Horie (堀江 菜桜, Horie Nao)
Voiced by: Masumi Asano (Japanese); Maggie Flecknoe (English)
Yui's best friend is in the same wind instrument club as her. Nao often sticks by Yui and knows her habits inside and out. After their club leader, Akane Hino whom Nao idolizes lost her dream, Nao has recently been having nightmares and has grown concerned. The cause is the twin dream demons Aeolian and Ionian who attempt to steal her body, but they have to face off against Yui and the rest of her team in brutal combat. Nao sees Engi as a model. With the twins' defeat, Nao thanks them gratefully. As the story concludes, Hino resumes her goal to Nao's delight.
Anri Hiiragi (柊杏璃, Hīragi Anri)
Yui and Nao's schoolmate. She had desired to become a brilliant manga artist ever since childhood. Merry stands up for Anri when she is persistently proven by her tutor (whom she refers to as a "Neanderthal") on her hard work on manga. They let her use Tachibana's restaurant as a meeting where she can have everyone's opinion on her efforts in making manga sheets. Isana and Anri get along well since their both interested in the artwork. Anri is stressed about whether she should continue drawing when others do not read the ones she prefers to draw. Though, Ren praises her personal work. When they rescue Anri from a scarecrow-like dream demon, her tutor, who is revealed to be her older brother, finally recognizes her manga. She became involved with dream demons at Yumeji's school when the festival opened.

=== Other characters ===
Old Man Tachibana (橘のおやっさん, Tachibana no Oyassan)
Voiced by: Keiji Fujiwara (Japanese); Andrew Love (English)
Isana's father runs the Tachibana family restaurant, which is also home to both Yumeji and, more recently, Merry. He tends to have some rather perverted hobbies but always acts calm and collected. He became aware of John's presence in his cat form.
Mizuki Akiyanagi (秋柳 瑞貴, Akiyanagi Mizuki)
Takateru's younger sister used to be rather sickly when she was younger. However, Mizuki has remarkably recovered much of her health as of the present. She is the only person amused by Takateru's haiku. She apparently has a brother complex and is shown to be fiercely (and comically) overprotective of her brother. She is hostile towards Saki because she believes she is acting too close towards her brother and that she has been causing trouble for him by picking fights with him. It is soon revealed Mizuki is the vessel of Clione, who is forced to serve Hercules in order to protect her.
"Sonar" Clione (「夢捜歌 (ソナー)」 クリオネ, Sonaa Kurione)
A female dream demon forced to serve Hercules. Although not as important, Clione is a dream demon with special duties like Merry. Normally, humans will naturally be attracted to the dream world that fits them the most; but in case the human cannot find such a dream, Clione will guide them to meet the dream demon. For this job, she has the ability to analyze wavelengths of dream demons and humans while on her daydream stage. Hercules used her ability to search to track other dream demons with the sound of her singing voice. Her human vessel is Mizuki, whom Clione was trapped by force, a year before the beginning of the series. Merry gave Clione some fun at an arcade, as Clione informs Yumeji that he is part dream demon with the same wavelength that matches Hercules'. After Clione gets injured by Hercules, Merry sends her back to the dream world happily. Clione reappears in the midst of Kyou's raid at the school festival.
Ren Hinaki (レン, Hinaki Ren)
A boy that initiates in doing good deeds, and he goes on playing the hero throughout the town. Anri mistakes Ren as a pervert assassin at first, and even knowing the truth she likes teasing him. Ren is the vessel for his side-kick "Hunter" Quartier Latin a small spider electric-type dream demon. He is able to fuse with Quartier and transform into a speedy superhero, which makes Yumeji really jealous. Ren unanimously allies with Merry and the others, expecting to defeat any of Hercules' remaining minions. He seems to be devoted to Merry as the gatekeeper. It is told that Ren is the heir to a family hospital, but with a distant parental relationship, and used to be part of a bully gang. As Ren and Anri bonded, she persuaded him to rekindle with his parents. Quartier is killed by Kyou; as a result, Ren's desire to make amends with his family comes true, but still recalls his experience of dream demons.
"Aqua" Regalecus (「アクア」, Regalecus)
A dream demon gave the appearance of a young girl by Kyou. Able to change her shape to a sea serpent creature. She sees humans as precious playthings or followers to entertain her with whatever skills they can offer. Initially, part of Kyou's henchmen until Regalecus discovers Jayce's crime in destroying a follower's hopes (a skateboard girl named Chika) then allies with Yumeji to relieve the pain. She later found herself believing in the Dream Eater pair principles since Kyou's plot is not any fun.

=== Anime original ===
Chizuru Kawanami (河浪 千鶴, Kawanami Chizuru)
Voiced by: Kana Ueda (Japanese); Melissa Davis (English)
Chizuru is a mysterious transfer student with who Isana tries to make friends. Having been orphaned at a young age, Chizuru had cast away her emotions and become the vessel of the dream demon, Lestion. However, she has started to open up towards Isana and wants to protect her from Mistleteinn after she is forced to become a vessel and is targeted. She ends up firing Lestion's gun at Mistleteinn, which shatters her dreams and soul, though Isana still stays friends with her, hoping she can start over again.
Lestion (レスティオン, Resution)
Voiced by: Takaya Kuroda (Japanese); Jay Hickman (English)
Chizuru's dream demon, who paired up with her for the sake of carrying out his revenge against Mistleteinn. Lestion and his men once confronted Mistleteinn leaving him the only survivor. His daydream is a cavern. He owns a gun that uses the despair from vessels having their dream demons being killed as ammo and requires his own life to fire it, choosing Chizuru as her vessel as she had allegedly given up her emotions. During the battle against Mistleteinn, he sacrifices himself in order to complete the bullet needed for the gun.
Ryota Iijima (飯島 良太, Iijima Ryōta)
Voiced by: Kenichi Suzumura (Japanese); Vic Mignogna (English)
Iijima is a guidance counselor who talks to students about their dreams. He appears friendly and helpful to students in achieving their dreams and loves eating rice balls. In reality, however, he is the vessel for the dream demon, Mistleteinn, who forces his students to become vessels for dream demons so that Mistleteinn can kill them, robbing the humans of their goals. When Mistleteinn is defeated by Merry and Engi, Iijima quits his teaching position.
Mistleteinn (ミストルティン, Misutorutin)
Voiced by: Sayuri Yahagi (Japanese); Monica Rial (English)
An evil dream demon with snow-white hair who appears in the anime. She has the power to force dream demons into human vessels, later targeting and killing them, resulting in the vessel losing all ambition in their goals. Her daydream is a sea filled with thorns. She is extremely strong, as it is noted that she is acknowledged by Pharos Hercules for her power. However, thanks to Yumeji's confidence, she is killed by Merry and Engi. Therefore Mistleteinn's victims: Serio, who guided her vessel Yumi in wanting to become a nurse; and Delga, who was helping his vessel Masaru achieve his dream of being a hero, were avenged.
Her second name means "ocean of trees".
Pallette (パレイド, Pareido)
Voiced by: Kimiko Koyama (Japanese); Serena Varghese (English)
A small dream demon that is forced by Mistleteinn to make Isana her vessel so that she and Iijima can target both of them. Although she is taken hostage by Mistleteinn, Merry manages to send her back home. Her name is pronounced "Parade" in the English dub.

== Media ==
=== Manga ===
The manga series by Yoshitaka Ushiki was serialized in Manga Time Kirara Forward magazine from March 24, 2008, to November 24, 2020, and was compiled into twenty four tankōbon volumes by Houbunsha, the first of which was released on October 27, 2008, and the last on December 11, 2020. One spin-off volume, Shadow Stomper Merry (影踏みメリー, Kagefumi Merī) by Kenji Tsurubuchi, and three anthology volumes were released in 2011. The manga has been licensed in France and Germany with the title Merry Nightmare.

=== Anime ===
An anime television series based on the manga Yumekui Merry was announced in the September 2010 issue of Houbunsha's Manga Time Kirara Forward magazine. Produced by J.C.Staff, the anime series is directed and written by Hideki Shirane, and music composition by Keiichi Oku. The anime series aired in Japan on the Tokyo Broadcasting System between January 7, 2011, and April 8, 2011, later rebroadcast on the Mainichi Broadcasting System, Chubu-Nippon Broadcasting, RKK, and the satellite channel BS-TBS. The opening theme for the anime is "Daydream Syndrome" by Marina Fujiwara while the ending is "Yume to Kibou to Ashita no Atashi" (ユメとキボーとアシタのアタシ, "Dreams and Hopes and the Me of Tomorrow") by Ayane Sakura. Both artists belong to the Japanese musical ensemble and dōjin circle, IOSYS. The anime has been licensed in North America by Sentai Filmworks under the title Dream Eater Merry.

==== Episodes ====
No.	Title	Original release date
1	"Dream Reality"; Transliteration: "Yume Utsutsu" (Japanese: 夢現)	January 7, 2011
Yumeji Fujiwara is a high school boy with the ability to predict people's dreams or nightmares. Recently, he has dreams of being chased by a gang of weird cats. One day, Yumeji meets a strange girl after she falls out of a tree and lands on him. After she leaves to look for her hat, Yumeji finds it, only to suddenly find himself in the world from his nightmare, and he is chased by Chaser John Doe and his cat army, who desires his body as a vessel. As Yumeji is cornered, the girl from before arrives, introducing herself as Merry Nightmare, and fights against John. As Merry tries to interrogate John to take her back to the world he came from, John just laughs at her and leaves, before both she and Yumeji return to the real world.
2	"Dreams and Hopes"; Transliteration: "Yume mo Kibō mo" (Japanese: 夢もキボーも)	January 14, 2011
Merry had suddenly collapsed, so Yumeji takes her home where his friend, Isana Tachibana, and her father help look after her at the Tachibana's family café. Merry explains to Yumeji that she had been hunting dream demons, trying to find a way back to the world she came from, only to be met with more questions. Later that night, Merry decides to leave to do things on her own, while Yumeji settles his resolve to help her. Meanwhile, a girl named Yumi with dreams of becoming a nurse ended up in a different dream world with her resident dream demon, Serio. However, Serio is suddenly killed, which causes Yumi to lose all her goals.
3	"From Beyond the Dream"; Transliteration: "Yume no Mukō kara" (Japanese: 夢の向こうから)	January 21, 2011
As Yumeji goes to search for Merry, he finds her at the park with a kid named Minato Kisaragi, who has trouble making friends. After playing with her for a bit, Yumeji decides to show off his ability, only to discover that Minato has been having nightmares. He soon ends up inside her daydream where a dream demon named Ichima wants to prevent Minato from making friends so she can become her vessel. Just then Merry arrives and manages to give Minato the confidence to say what is right before Merry banishes Ichima. Upon returning to the real world once again, Minato goes to make some friends while Merry goes off on her own again.
4	"Dream Eater Merry"; Transliteration: "Yumekui Merī" (Japanese: 夢喰いメリー)	January 28, 2011
The president of Yumeji's literature club, Mei Hoshino, has been sending texts with a mysterious boy named Chris Evergreen. Later that day, Yumeji and Mei, as well as fellow club members Takateru Akiyanagi and Saki Kirishima, bring Merry along to karaoke, while Isana tries to make friends with a transfer student named Chizuru Kawanami. Later that night, when Mei comes to the café having supposedly been stood up by Chris, she suddenly acts weird and texts herself from another phone. Yumeji realizes that Mei has become a vessel for Chris, who is actually another dream demon, and chases after her, ending up in her daydream. As Chris prepares to attack him, Merry arrives and defeats him. Before Chris disappears, Mei asks to look at him and comes off happily from what she sees. From that point, Yumeji decides to work together with Merry to help her find nightmares, and she starts working part-time at the café.
5	"Astray in a Dream"; Transliteration: "Yume no Naka de Asutorei" (Japanese: 夢の中でアストレイ)	February 4, 2011
Isana gets depressed upon hearing her idol, Yokato, announced his resignation from singing on TV. Yumeji and Merry go grocery shopping, where Yumeji learns that Merry had apparently arrived in the real world about ten years ago. They later meet a girl named Yui Kounagi, with Yumeji helping her rescue a doll she dropped. Yui, who is actually the willing vessel of a dream demon named Engi Threepiece, has her trigger a daydream within which Yumeji and Merry are caught in. Engi questions them about someone named Pharos Hercules, before beginning to fight with Merry. As Merry talks about sending Engi back to where she came from, Engi claims that there is no way back for dream demons, revealing her sister was killed when she entered the real world. Questioning whether she has actually been doing the right thing, Merry is unable to fight back against Engi, forcing Yumeji to stand between them, receiving a slash to his chest.
6	"Dream Encounter"; Transliteration: "Yume Kaikō" (Japanese: 夢邂逅(かいこう))	February 11, 2011
Traumatized by the attack on Yumeji, Merry unleashes a powerful aura that destroys the dream world's moon, forcing Engi to retreat. Upon returning to the real world, Yumeji does not have any external injuries, but when he gets home he starts feeling pain and falls unconscious. As he dreams, Yumeji once again meets John, who treats his mental injuries. Meanwhile, at school, Saki brings up how many students like Yumi have been suffering from "dream loss", in which they give up on their goals. John explains to Yumeji that it's because of him that Yumeji can enter other people's daydreams, and reveals Hercules is an evil dream demon who tempted many others into entering the real world. He also mentions that Hercules may know something about Merry, who allegedly entered the real world without a vessel. After Yumeji's wounds heal, John warns him about another strong dream demon named Mistleteinn before he wakes up to a worried Merry.
7	"Dreams, Swimsuits and the Color of the Sea"; Transliteration: "Yume to Mizugi to Umi no Iro" (Japanese: 夢と水着と海の色)	February 18, 2011
Isana's father impulsively decides to take everyone on a trip to the beach, Isana even invites Chizuru. Merry becomes concerned about what Engi had said to her, wondering if what she had been doing up until then had been wrong. Meanwhile, a kid named Masaru, who came to attend the shooting of a superhero show, gets pulled into a daydream with his dream demon, Delga, who is attacked and killed by none other than Mistleteinn, causing the boy to lose his hopes. During the sunset, as Merry considers leaving again, Yumeji says he'll continue to support and help her in order to prove Engi wrong.
8	"Dream Corridor"; Transliteration: "Yume Kairō" (Japanese: 夢回廊)	February 25, 2011
Having picked up a sprained ankle during his trip to the beach, Yumeji gets it treated at a clinic, which just so happens to be owned by Yui's family. Meanwhile, Isana becomes concerned about what she wants to do after high school. Speaking through Yui as a vessel, Engi apologizes to Yumeji for her actions and explains her situation. As Yumeji fetches Merry at a doughnut bar to go talk with them, they all find themselves in a maze-like daydream, run by the dream demon Maze Landsborough, who is a follower of Hercules.
9	"Disturbed Dreams"; Transliteration: "Yume Midarete" (Japanese: 夢乱れて)	March 4, 2011
As Isana leaves her guidance counseling session, she temporarily enters a daydream. Although Merry easily defeats Landsborough's henchmen, she is hesitant to attack him due to what Engi had told her. He then taunts Engi, explaining that if he is killed, then the dreams of his vessel will disappear as well. Engi attacks Landsborough out of anger, but Yumeji stops her and Landsborough escapes with his vessel. After calming down, Engi reveals what she knows about Mistleteinn, who has the power to force dream demons into vessels. Meanwhile, Chizuru, a vessel herself, confronts the guidance counselor, Ryōta Iijima, who is actually Mistleteinn's vessel, saying his next target is Isana who, at that time, Yumeji and Merry discover to have become a vessel.
10	"Not Waking from a Dream"; Transliteration: "Yume kara Samezu ni" (Japanese: 夢から覚めずに)	March 11, 2011
As Yumeji becomes frustrated about Isana's situation, Chizuru, who had previously thrown away all her emotions following her parents' deaths, becomes conflicted between her desire to protect Isana and her duties towards her dream demon, Lestion. Yumeji goes to see Yui and Engi, asking for their help in protecting Isana's dreams. Meanwhile, Landsborough witnesses Hercules in action as he kills another dream demon, informing him about Engi and Merry, whom Hercules sees as no threat. As Yumeji returns home, he is greeted by Chizuru who informs him that Mistleteinn plans to target Isana, ignoring Yumeji's question concerning whether she is an ally or not.
11	"Protectors of Dreams"; Transliteration: "Yume no Moribito" (Japanese: 夢の守り人)	March 25, 2011
Yumeji and Merry take Isana to Yui and Engi so that they can meet her dream demon, Pallette, who explains how Mistleteinn forced her to make Isana her vessel. Merry wants to send her back but is not confident enough to try so with Isana's dreams at stake. Meanwhile, Chizuru confronts Iijima, who reveals his intentions to kill Pallette, as well as questioning Yumeji's abilities, though Chizuru is too conflicted by her duties to Lestion to warn Yumeji or Isana. Later that day, Iijima and Mistleteinn make their attack on Isana and Pallette, also planning to lure out Chizuru and Lestion, but Merry and Yumeji appear to protect them. Mistleteinn overwhelms Merry while Yumeji's attempt to rescue Pallette is thwarted by Iijima, who reveals Chizuru had done nothing to prevent the deaths of other dream demons. As Mistleteinn prepares to kill both Isana and Pallette, Chizuru decides to stand in their way to protect her. Having apparently seen something interesting, Iijima and Mistleteinn decide to retreat, promising to resume the battle following the exams.
12	"Nightmare"; Transliteration: "Muen" (Japanese: 夢魘)	April 1, 2011
As Yumeji and the others grow concerned about Mistleteinn's strength, Chizuru brings everyone into her daydream to meet Lestion, who explains that the only way to hurt Mistleteinn is a special gun which uses the agony from killed dream demons and the despair from humans as ammo. As Lestion leaves to do his own thing, Engi shows her belief in human dreams due to the extraordinary nature of Merry and Yumeji. Later, Chizuru mentions that Lestion will die if he fires the gun, becoming afraid that her memories with Isana may soon be erased. After the final exams are finished, Iijima comes to the café and Engi brings everyone into her daydream in order to use her home field to her advantage, but Mistleteinn kidnaps Isana and summons a large tree. Engi uses her strongest attack on Mistleteinn, but she survives and deals a critical blow to her. With Merry similarly outmatched, Yumeji takes Engi's sword and charges towards Mistleteinn.
13	"Dream Again"; Transliteration: "Yume Futatabi" (Japanese: 夢ふたたび)	April 8, 2011
As Yumeji's attack against Mistleteinn fails, Lestion sacrifices himself in order to provide Chizuru with a bullet to shoot Mistleteinn, shattering her own soul in the process. However, Mistleteinn survives the attack and catches Merry in a bud of despair, causing her to face her own despair. Yumeji, however, decides not to give and uses the power of his dreams to replicate John's weapon. As Yumeji takes on Mistleteinn's attacks, Yui manages to free Merry, who becomes invigorated by Yumeji's belief in her, restoring Engi's dream world and healing her injuries. As Merry and Engi launch an attack on her, Mistleteinn swallows Pallette, so that killing her would mean destroying Isana's dreams. Yet, after encouragement from Yumeji, Merry manages to send Pallette back to the dream world and defeat Mistleteinn, returning everyone to the real world, with Isana perfectly fine. Although Chizuru's dreams were shattered, Yumeji feels confident that she can start over again, as humans are not limited to only one dream. Yumeji and Merry's quest continues...

=== Video game ===
Characters from the series appear alongside other Manga Time Kirara characters in the 2018 mobile RPG, Kirara Fantasia.

== Reception ==
In their Winter 2011 Anime Preview Guide, the majority of Anime News Network's staff of reviewers gave modest ratings for the first episode. Theron Martin states the series is straddling the line between the typical and the really weird, but figuring out what's going on should be half the fun. Jacob Chapman comments that the first episode was unusual in that it was nicely paced and "goes down easy." Gia Manry compares Yumekui Merry to a poor man's Soul Eater with its definite sense of style over substance.
