= Mahōtsukai Rosé no Sado Life =

Japanese manga series

- First tankōbon volume cover

魔法使いロゼの佐渡ライフ (Mahōtsukai Roze no Sado Raifu)
- Genre: Comedy; Reverse isekai; Slice of life
- Manga
- Written by: Ominaeshi
- Published by: Houbunsha
- Imprint: Manga Time KR Comics Forward Series
- Magazine: Manga Time Kirara Forward
- Original run: August 24, 2022 – present
- Volumes: 7
- Anime television series

Mahōtsukai Rosé no Sado Life (Japanese: 魔法使いロゼの佐渡ライフ, Hepburn: Mahōtsukai Roze no Sado Raifu) is a Japanese manga series written and illustrated by Ominaeshi. It began serialization in Houbunsha's Manga Time Kirara Forward magazine in August 2022, and has been compiled into seven volumes as of October 2026. An anime television series adaptation has been announced.

== Plot ==
Roséstalia, a young witch who is tired of her village life, wished to be transported to another world. She finds herself in the island city of Sado, Niigata in Japan. She meets Sana Tsuchiya, a kind girl who treats her to food. Rosé is initially skeptical about Sana, finding it strange that Sana would treat a stranger so kindly, but upon learning about her past, Rosé and Sana form a bond.

== Characters ==
Roséstalia (ロゼスタリア, Rozesutaria)
Also known as Rosé (ロゼ) for short, she had been living a difficult life in her mother's hometown following her mother's death. Due to the locals discriminating against her because of her black hair, she dreamt of finding a new life elsewhere. She is initially amazed by modern Japan and takes some times to adjust to her new world.
Sana Tsuchiya (土屋 紗菜, Tsuchiya Sana)
A girl living in Sado who encounters Rosé after she is transported to Japan. She was orphaned at a young age and is determined to help others.

== Media ==
=== Manga ===
Written and illustrated by Ominaeshi, the series began serialization in Houbunsha's Manga Time Kirara Forward magazine on August 24, 2022. The first tankōbon volume was released on May 11, 2023; seven volumes have been released as of October 9, 2026.

No.	Release date	ISBN
1	May 11, 2023	978-4-8322-7460-0
2	September 12, 2023	978-4-8322-7484-6
3	April 11, 2024	978-4-8322-9540-7
4	January 10, 2025	978-4-8322-9604-6
5	July 11, 2025	978-4-8322-9647-3
6	March 12, 2026	978-4-8322-9704-3
7	October 9, 2026	978-4-8322-9758-6

=== Anime ===
An anime television series adaptation was announced in Manga Time Kirara Forward on February 24, 2026.

== Reception ==
The series was nominated for the tenth Next Manga Awards in the print category.
