= The Anemone Feels the Heat =

Japanese manga series

- First tankōbon volume cover

アネモネは熱を帯びる (Anemone wa Netsu o Obiru)
- Genre: Yuri
- Manga
- Written by: Ren Sakuragi
- Published by: Houbunsha
- English publisher: NA: Yen Press
- Imprint: Manga Time KR Comics Forward Series
- Magazine: Manga Time Kirara Forward
- Original run: November 24, 2020 – April 24, 2025
- Volumes: 9

The Anemone Feels the Heat (アネモネは熱を帯びる, Anemone wa Netsu o Obiru) is a Japanese manga series written and illustrated by Ren Sakuragi. It was serialized in Houbunsha's Manga Time Kirara Forward magazine from November 2020 to April 2025.

== Synopsis ==
Nagisa Ootsuki spent her time in middle school diligently studying with the aim of passing the entrance exam to her first choice of high schools. However, on the day of exam Nagisa stopped to help a girl seemingly about to faint in the snow, causing her to miss the exams and instantly fail. Dejected, Nagisa applied to a nearby school while changing her look completely, dying her hair and swapping her glasses for contacts, only to find that the girl who now sits next to her in class, Mashiro Komiyama, is the same one she stopped to help that caused her to fail her entrance exam.

== Publication ==
Written and illustrated by Ren Sakuragi, The Anemone Feels the Heat was serialized in Houbunsha's Manga Time Kirara Forward magazine from November 24, 2020, to April 24, 2025. Its chapters have been collected in nine tankōbon volumes released from June 11, 2021, to July 11, 2025.

During their panel at Anime NYC 2024, Yen Press announced that they had licensed the series for English publication.

No.	Original release date	Original ISBN	North American release date	North American ISBN
1	June 11, 2021	978-4-8322-7282-8	March 18, 2025	979-8-8554-0095-3
1. "So We Meet Again" (再会, Saikai); 2. "Our Secret" (2人の秘密, 2-ri no himitsu); 3. "Gaze" (目線, Mesen); 4. "Date" (デー卜, Dē boku); 5. "Hug" (ハグ, Hagu); 6. "Special" (特別, Tokubetsu)
2	December 10, 2021	978-4-8322-7331-3	August 26, 2025	979-8-8554-0097-7
7. "Liking Someone" (好きとは？, Suki to wa?); 8. "Test Prep" (テスト勉強, Tesuto benkyō); 9. "Sleepover" (お泊まり, O tomari); 10. "Honesty" (素直に, Sunao ni); 11. "Happiness" (幸せ, Shiawase); 12. "I Like You" (好き, Suki)
3	June 10, 2022	978-4-8322-7371-9	March 24, 2026	979-8-8554-0099-1
13. "Unrequited" (片想い, Kataomoi); 14. "Fight" (ケンカ, Kenka); 15. "The Beach" (海, Umi); 16. "Feelings" (想い, Omoi); 17. "The Ties That Bind Us" (繋がり, Tsunagari); 18. "Tears" (涙, Namida)
4	December 12, 2022	978-4-8322-7424-2	January 26, 2027	979-8-8554-0101-1
19. 彼女 (Kanojo); 20. 友達 (Tomodachi); 21. 知る (Shiru); 22. 文化祭① (Bunkamatsuri ①); 23. 文化祭② (Bunkamatsuri ②); 24. 文化祭③ (Bunkamatsuri ③)
5	July 12, 2023	978-4-8322-7468-6	—	—
25. ペアリング (Pea ringu); 26. 大丈夫 (Daijōbu); 27. クリスマス① (Kurisumasu ①); 28. クリスマス② (Kurisumasu ②); 29. 笑顔 (Egao); 30. 初詣 (Hatsumōde)
6	December 12, 2023	978-4-8322-9509-4	—	—
31. 欲 (Yoku); 32. お弁当 (O bentō); 33. 彼女 (Kanojo); 34. バレンタイン (Barentain); 35. 先生 (Sensei); 36. 後輩 (Kōhai)
7	July 12, 2024	978-4-8322-9559-9	—	—
37. 失恋 (Shitsuren); 38. 挨拶 (Aisatsu); 39. 卒業 (Sotsugyō); 40. 1-B; 41. 出会い (Deai); おまけ：大人組 (Omake: otona-gumi)
8	January 10, 2025	978-4-8322-9603-9	—	—
42. 後輩 (Kōhai); 43. すれ違い (Surechigai); 44. 喧嘩 (Kenka); 45. 憧れ (Akogare); 46. 女の子 (On'nanoko); 47. ずつと (Zutsu to)
9	July 11, 2025	978-4-8322-9646-6	—	—
48. もうー度 (Mō ̄-do); 49. 心の声 (Kokoro no koe); 50. これから (Korekara); 51. 夏祭り (Natsu matsuri); Final: 愛 (Ai)

== Reception ==
In 2023, the series was nominated for the 9th Next Manga Award in the print category.
