= Bullet Girls 2 =

2016 video game

- Japanese box art
- Developer: Shade
- Publisher: D3 Publisher
- Composer: Masanori Hikichi
- Platform: PlayStation Vita
- Release: JP: April 21, 2016
- Genre: Third-person shooter
- Mode: Single-player

Bullet Girls 2 (バレットガールズ2, Baretto Gāruzu 2) is a third-person shooter video game for the PlayStation Vita developed by Shade and published by D3 Publisher. It is the sequel to 2014's Bullet Girls, and, similar to the first game, it is a shooter with erotic and fanservice elements as well as additional content and features not present in the original. The game was released in Japan on April 21, 2016.

== Gameplay ==
Similar to the first game, Bullet Girls 2 is a shooter video game with erotic elements. It is a full sequel, and incorporates additional content including new characters, new actions, as well as systems that "users have been waiting for". This includes an expansion to the "interrogation training" feature which premiered in the first game, where users "extract critical information from the opposing side", but is mostly just touching and groping the girls using various items. Also present is an enhanced interrogation mode allowing the player to interrogate two girls at once. Players are able to remodel and level-up in-game weapons in order to increase their performance. Additionally, certain weapon types work better with certain girls. There are also numerous outfits for the girls that can be equipped, including a mask worn by Full Frontal from Mobile Suit Gundam, ultimately amounting to over 14,400 different combinations.

Numerous battlefields can be played on, including a Shimakaze map where the girls fight on top of a battleship. Similar to the first game, Bullet Girls 2 revolves around a group of girls belonging to the "Ranger Club", a school organization which trains members in defensive tactics. Players control the girls and battle with weapons to counter enemies. Characters Aya Hinamoto (voiced by Mao Ichimichi) and Ran Saejima (voiced by Eriko Matsui) return from Bullet Girls with additional characters Rumi Yukishiro and Meiko Hoshikawa being newly playable. Story-wise, Bullet Girls 2 is a continuation from the first; Aya encounters a pair of mysterious girls during a mission, and her advisor informs her of a mock battle against Elda Private Institute, leading to Elda Private fighting Aya's own school Misakimori Private Academy. Bullet Girls 2 is played from a third-person perspective.

== Development and promotion ==
Bullet Girls 2 was first announced in early December 2015, with additional details being revealed in the December 17 issue of Weekly Famitsu. A six-minute trailer was published in February 2016, where new characters and additional game features were teased. A second trailer was also revealed in early April, where further game modes and characters were introduced. An additional third three-minute trailer was released shortly after, were the game's "Interrogation Training" features were highlighted. Numerous screenshots of the girls in different costumes were also shown.

Bullet Girls 2 was released on April 21, 2016. The game has only been announced for Japan only, and Chris Carter of Destructoid noted that chances of a localization are "slim to none."

Early customers of the game receive bonuses, ranging from mouse pads to tapestries. Such items are store-specific and numerous Japanese retailers participated, including Softmap, WonderGOO, Imagine, Anibro, Ami Ami, Rakuten Books, Neo-Wing, and HMV.

== Reception ==
Four Famitsu reviewers gave Bullet Girls 2 scores of 8, 8, 7 and 7 out of 10, for a total score of 30/40. The game sold 17,224 copies on its launch week, charting fourth on the Japanese market.

== Characters ==
Misakimori Private Academy

- Aya Hinomoto (火乃本 彩?) (voiced by Mao Ichimichi), a happy go lucky girl and a First Aid Club member after joining the Ranger Club. Aya was cheerful along with her friend Yurina who visited summer camp that she was strong willed to the other club members.
- Yurina Kanezono (金園 優理奈?) (voiced by Aya Uchida), a shy girl who was friends with Aya she was scared that a spy from Elda Private Institute sent a message to Yurina so she needs to protect Aya, friends and family from being bullied by an Elda spy.
- Remi Kishino (木住野 玲美?) (voiced by Kaori Fukuhara), a hyperactive girl who went out of control and went madness mode for her personality as the cat devil.
- Tsukiyo Takanashi (高梨 月代?) (voiced by Sachika Misawa), a ninja who was spying at Misakimori club members who was quick on her feet who squeezes bellies on other girls.
- Saki Amamine (天峰 咲姫?) (voiced by Aya Suzaki), an immature girl who loves sweets and eats candies at her club her favorite sweet dessert was macaroons of the mobile food.
- Minagi Kamishiro (神代 海凪?) (voiced by Emi Uema), a spectacled samurai warrior who was silent who serves as a chief of staff for the Misakimori school. She improved more than Musashi Miyamoto and her father as a successor of the school.
- Aki Saotome (早乙女 陽希?) (voiced by Asami Tano), a vice president of Misakimori who was taught by her grandmother about World War II and called Aki the "Bullet Girls of legend" along with Meika Hoshikawa. She was close friends with Mai along with Chiharu Kosaka with the growth strength that pleased to Meika.
- Mai Doiuchi (土居内 麻衣?) (voiced by Yuiko Tatsumi), a president of the Misakimori Ranger club and a princess of the wealthy Doiuchi family. Mai was doing all of extracurricular activities around Misakimori in her life. She was friends with Aki and Chiharu who fought across countries as a Japan representative.
- Meika Hoshikawa (星川 冥香?) (voiced by Yui Makino), a handler and an adviser of the Misakimori Private Academy after graduating from the academy. In Meika's story episode she was a playable character along with her mask and her uniform that is seen on one of the display cases in her clubroom. In Meika's story mode Meika will conquer Bullet Girls by defeating both school factions like Misakimori and Eldagakuin student and steal the Shimakaze to be the best legend of Bullet Girls.
- Rumi Yukishiro (雪城 瑠水?) (voiced by Muta Minami), a shopkeeper and a playable character along with her disguise for the Eldagakujin shopkeeper member.

Eldagakujin Private Institute

The new original characters from the new school that featured in Bullet Girls 2

- Ran Saejima (冴嶋 嵐) (voiced by Eriko Matsui) a naughty girl who transfers from Misakimori to Eldagakujin as a double agent who sent a message to Yurina for an Interscholastic Warfare event. Ran was training in extracurricular activities and become ranked first in order to fight against the Misakimori.
- Jelly Nuage (ジェリー・ニュアージュ) (voiced by Hisako Kanemoto) a foreign girl from France who loves Japanese culture and buying some anime and manga for her investment of money from her parents as a serious talent.
- Miu Rouyama (楼山 美雨) (voiced by Satomi Akesaka) a blue haired pony tailed girl who shows her fighting spirit for the Elda school and her director Chiharu. Miu was showing great talent that she was showing gratitude to her academy of her life.
- Kasumi Konoe (近衛 霞未) (voiced by Chinami Hashimoto) a shy girl and a twin sister of Kirino who was charmful and loves fish.
- Kirino Konoe (近衛 霧乃) (voiced by Yuuki Kana) a mean girl like Ran and another twin of Kasumi she loves meat and showing her temperament.
- Chiharu Kosaka (香坂 千晴) (voiced by Aina Kusuda) a sub-leader student of the Elda Private Academy. She was the empress of the interrogation training who laughs villainy. She was friends with Aki and Mai that fought across the world as a representative of Japan.
