= Rin Kusumi =

Japanese voice actress

- Born: June 17; Gunma Prefecture, Japan
- Occupation: Voice actress
- Years active: 2020–present
- Agent: I'm Enterprise
- Notable work: Slow Loop as Koharu Minagi

Rin Kusumi (久住 琳, Kusumi Rin; born June 17) is a Japanese voice actress from Gunma Prefecture who is affiliated with I'm Enterprise. She started her voice acting activities after winning the grand prize at an international voice acting audition in 2016. After a period of training at the Japan Narration Actor Institute, she debuted as a voice actress in 2020. In 2022, she was cast in her first main anime role as Hiyori Minagi in Slow Loop.

== Filmography ==
=== Anime ===
2020

- Aikatsu on Parade!, Customer

2021

- Laid-Back Camp Season 2, Cafe clerk
- Fruits Basket, Graduate
- Pretty Boy Detective Club
- Love Live! Superstar!!
- To Your Eternity
- The Night Beyond the Tricornered Window

2022

- Slow Loop, Hiyori Minagi
- Skeleton Knight in Another World, Lauren Laraiya du Luvierte

2023

- My Unique Skill Makes Me OP Even at Level 1, Emily Brown
- I Shall Survive Using Potions!, Kaoru
- Tearmoon Empire, Maids

2024

- Astro Note, Women
- Blue Box, Eimei Sports Clubs' Members

2025

- Wandance, Monme Hirai
- May I Ask for One Final Thing?, Maid, Diana's Maid

2026

- You Can't Be in a Rom-Com with Your Childhood Friends!, Shio Minamo
- A Hundred Scenes of Awajima, Students
- Dandelion, Mysterious Voice
- The Ghost in the Shell, Sacred Citizen Relief Shelter Children

=== Video games ===
2022

- Echocalypse: Scarlet Covenant, Pierrot
