= Anne Happy =

Japanese manga series

- Anne Happy manga volume 1 cover featuring Anne Hanakoizumi

あんハピ♪ (Anhapi♪)
- Genre: Comedy, Slice of life
- Manga
- Written by: Cotoji
- Published by: Houbunsha
- English publisher: NA: Yen Press
- Magazine: Manga Time Kirara Forward
- Original run: December 24, 2012 – November 24, 2018
- Volumes: 10
- Anime television series
- Directed by: Shin Oonuma
- Produced by: Hiroyuki Kobayashi; Yukihiro Itō; Hiroyuki Tanaka; Jun Fukuda; Hayato Kaneko; Mika Shimizu; Shunsuke Matsumura; Shinobu Satō; Hideyuki Saida; Toshiya Niikura; Shōichi Horita
- Written by: Jin Tanaka
- Music by: Monaca
- Studio: Silver Link
- Licensed by: Crunchyroll
- Original network: AT-X, Tokyo MX, Sun TV, KBS Kyoto, BS Fuji
- Original run: April 7, 2016 – June 23, 2016
- Episodes: 12

Anne Happy (あんハピ♪, Anhapi♪), also known as Unhappy Go Lucky! or Unhappy, is a Japanese comedy manga series written and illustrated by Cotoji. It focuses on a group of teenage girls with various misfortunes as they try to overcome them to find happiness. The series was serialized in Houbunsha's Manga Time Kirara Forward magazine from December 2012 to November 2018, and is published in English by Yen Press. An anime television series adaptation by Silver Link aired in Japan between April and June 2016.

== Plot ==
Tennomifune Academy (天之御船学園, Tennomifune Gakuen) is an elite school where students train in various subjects. That is, except for the students of Class 1–7, a.k.a. the "Happiness Class", who have been deemed "unfortunate" and must try to overcome their own misfortune and achieve happiness. The series follows Anne "Hanako" Hanakoizumi, who has terrible luck, and her classmates Ruri, Botan, Hibiki, and Ren, who each have their own misfortunes, as they try to find their own happiness.

== Characters ==
=== Main characters ===
Anne Hanakoizumi (花小泉 杏, Hanakoizumi An) / Hanako (はなこ)
Voiced by: Yumiri Hanamori
A cheerful girl who has a constantly positive attitude despite having absolutely terrible luck, causing her to fall into manholes and the like. She loves animals but is constantly getting attacked by them.
Ruri Hibarigaoka (雲雀丘 瑠璃, Hibarigaoka Ruri) / Hibari (ヒバリ)
Voiced by: Haruka Shiraishi
A caring girl who seems perfectly normal albeit for a strange romantic obsession with a construction sign mascot.
Botan Kumegawa (久米川 牡丹, Kumegawa Botan) / Botan (ぼたん)
Voiced by: Kiyono Yasuno
A fragile girl who gets injured very easily (e.g. a handshake breaks her hand bones), though being the daughter of a doctor, she is efficient at treating her own injuries. She also has a negative aura and gets depressed over the smallest things.
Hibiki Hagyū (萩生 響, Hagyū Hibiki) / Hibiki (ヒビキ)
Voiced by: Hibiku Yamamura
A girl with a terrible sense of direction who gets lost easily. She is a tsundere with a crush on her childhood friend Ren and is hostile towards females who get close to her.
Ren Ekoda (江古田 蓮, Ekoda Ren) / Ren (レン)
Voiced by: Mayu Yoshioka
Hibiki's childhood friend, who has a strange condition in which females of any species are indiscriminately attracted to her. She is also rather dopey and enjoys sleeping.

=== Other characters ===
Kodaira (小平)
Voiced by: Yumi Hara
The homeroom teacher of Class 1-7.
Timothy (チモシー, Chimoshī)
Voiced by: Chitose Morinaga
A robotic rabbit butler who serves as a guide to the school.
Tsubaki Sayama (狭山 椿, Sayama Tsubaki)
Voiced by: Chitose Morinaga
A student with social anxiety, and the one who controls Timothy.
Saginomiya (鷺宮)
Voiced by: Ami Koshimizu
The homeroom teacher of Class 1-1, who does not agree with the methods of Class 1-7.
Sakura Hanakoizumi (花小泉 桜, Hanakoizumi Sakura)
Voiced by: Yūko Gibu
Anne's mother, who suffers a similar amount of misfortune as her daughter.
Principal (校長, Kōchō)
Voiced by: Hiroshi Naka
The principal (head teacher) of Tennomifune Academy.

== Media ==
=== Manga ===
Cotoji began serializing the manga in the February 2013 issue of Houbunsha's Manga Time Kirara Forward magazine, sold in December 2012. The manga is licensed in North America by Yen Press. The manga ended serialization in the January 2019 issue of Manga Time Kirara Forward magazine, sold on November 24, 2018.

==== Volumes ====
No.	Original release date	Original ISBN	English release date	English ISBN
1	July 12, 2013	978-4-8322-4319-4	May 24, 2016	978-0-316-27217-9
2	May 12, 2014	978-4-8322-4441-2	August 23, 2016	978-0-316-27612-2
3	December 12, 2014	978-4-8322-4501-3	November 15, 2016	978-0-316-31785-6
4	July 13, 2015	978-4-8322-4587-7	February 28, 2017	978-0-316-31788-7
5	April 12, 2016	978-4-8322-4684-3	May 23, 2017	978-0-316-55970-6
6	June 11, 2016	978-4-8322-4703-1	August 22, 2017	978-0-316-55968-3
7	February 10, 2017	978-4-8322-4803-8	November 14, 2017	978-0-316-41277-3
8	November 9, 2017	978-4-8322-4891-5	October 30, 2018	978-1-9753-0239-9
9	August 9, 2018	978-4-8322-4969-1	May 21, 2019	978-1-9753-5670-5
10	January 12, 2019	978-4-8322-7058-9	October 29, 2019	978-1-9753-5854-9

=== Anime ===
An anime television series adaptation is animated by Silver Link, directed by Shin Oonuma and written by Hitoshi Tanaka, with character designs by Miwa Oshima. The series aired in Japan between April 7 and June 22, 2016, broadcasting on AT-X, Tokyo MX, Sun TV, KBS Kyoto, and BS Fuji, and was simulcast by Crunchyroll. The opening theme is "Punch Mind Happiness" and the ending theme is "Ashita de Ii Kara" (明日でいいから; "I'll Do it Tomorrow'), both performed by Happy Clover (Yumiri Hanamori, Haruka Shiraishi, Kiyono Yasuno, Hibiku Yamamura, and Mayu Yoshioka).

No.	Title	Original release date
1	"April 7: An Unfortunate First Day of School" "Shigatsu Nanoka: Fukō na Nyūgaku Shonichi" (Japanese: 4月7日 不幸な入学初日)	April 7, 2016
On her first day of high school, Ruri "Hibari" Hibarigaoka comes across an unlucky girl named Anne "Hanako" Hanakoizumi dangling off a bridge while rescuing a dog. After Hanako and Hibari meet their fragile classmate, Botan Kumegawa, their homeroom teacher Kodaira reveals that, unlike the other classes dedicated to sports and arts, Class 7 is filled with allegedly unfortunate students who must strive to obtain happiness. After being tasked with taking care of an egg without breaking it, Hanako and Botan get in a jam while trying to rescue a cat, but are soon aided by Hibari, who is revealed to have an obsession with a construction sign. The next day, Hanako's egg, the only one that didn't break overnight, hatches into a chick.
2	"April 11: The High-Tech Physical Exam" "Shigatsu Jū-ichi-nichi: Haiteku na Shintai Sokutei" (Japanese: 4月11日 ハイテクな身体測定)	April 14, 2016
While on their way to a physical exam, Hanako and the others come across a robotic rabbit named Timothy, who serves as a guide to the school. After getting through the exams, the girls decide to try out the various clubs, only to suddenly find themselves on the run from a stampede of animals. After everything is settled, Hibari decides against joining a club so she can spend more time with her friends.
3	"April 28: My First Happiness Training" "Shigatsu Ni-jū-hachi-nichi: Hajimete no Kōfuku Jitsugi" (Japanese: 4月28日 はじめての幸福実技)	April 21, 2016
Class 7 end up having to take part in an overly elaborate life-sized board game. There, the girls compete with Hibiki Hagyū, who gets lost easily, and her childhood friend Ren Ekoda, who she has a crush on. Facing various obstacles on every space, both Hanako and Hibiki's teams end up stuck in an infinite loop and are put in a competition to determine who ends up in last place. With the final match being a quiz, Hanako causes her team to end up last in order to save Hibari from revealing her personal secrets.
4	"April 29: A Mysterious Penalty" "Shigatsu Ni-jū-ku-nichi: Nazonazo na Batsu Gēmu" (Japanese: 4月29日 ナゾナゾな罰ゲーム)	April 28, 2016
As part of their penalty for coming in last, Hanako, Hibari, and Botan are tasked with taking a picture of their "lucky items" over the weekend. While Hibari and Botan look across town for a flower representing Hanako's lucky item, Hanako comes across Hibiki and Ren as they are following the others and has them join them. Thanks to Ren's affinity that causes all females to become attracted to her, the girls find the garden where Hanako's flower lies. After Hanako helps her after getting lost in a flower maze, Hibiki helps to take a picture that fulfils all three lucky item requirements.
5	"May 9: Getting Lost on the Way to School" "Gogatsu Kokonoka: Maigo no Tōkō Fūkei" (Japanese: 5月9日 迷子の登校風景)	May 5, 2016
Hibiki attempts to go to school on her own, coming across the other girls as they make their respective commutes. Holding a misdirected grudge against Hibari, Hibiki finds her pass case containing a picture of the sign she likes. While planning to use it as blackmail, Hibiki comes across her old kindergarten, reminding her of when she first came to fall in love with Ren. When Hibiki was afraid of having her hair cut after it got stuck in a gate, Ren cut her own hair to give her some reassurance. After Ren manages to find her, Hibiki decides against using Hibari's pass case to blackmail her and returns it.
6	"May 30: A Field Trip With Everyone" "Gogatsu San-jū-nichi: Minna de Ensoku" (Japanese: 5月30日 みんなで遠足)	May 12, 2016
The class goes on an orienteering trip in the mountains said to contain several lucky power spots. Hanako's group faces a troublesome encounter with some hostile monkeys, but manage to reach the first power spot and enjoy lunch together. Following lunch, however, Hanako goes missing after going off to wash her utensils, prompting Hibari and the others to go and search for her. After managing to find her, the girls come up against an escaped bear but are rescued by Kodaira.
7	"June 28: Visiting Hanako" "Rokugatsu Ni-jū-hachi-nichi: Hanako no Omimai" (Japanese: 6月28日 はなこのお見舞い)	May 19, 2016
As the class is tasked with making their wishes come true, Hanako comes down with a fever after becoming soaked in the rain. Hibari and Botan pay a visit to Hanako's home and meet her mother, Sakura, who used to be a Class 7 student. The next day, as Hanako is still absent, the girls decide to make some teru teru bōzu to wish for the rain to stop. Thanks to their efforts, the sky clears up the next day and Hanako is able to return to school, leading them all to pass their assignments.
8	"July 11: Fighting Final Exams" "Shichigatsu Jū-ichi-nichi: Tatakau Kimatsu Shiken" (Japanese: 7月11日 戦う 期末試験)	May 26, 2016
As part of their final exams, Class 7 are faced with a surprise exam in a virtual space, in which they must play multiple games of chance to determine their score. After Hanako loses several points playing rock-paper-scissors, Timothy brings her and the others to a special arena where they can fight each other to take their opponent's points. After Ren beats Hibari and Botan beats Hibiki, Hanako ends up being pitted against Kodaira. Hearing the Botan's wish to spend time with everyone during summer break, the girls all join Hanako in fighting against Kodaira. Although they ultimately end up losing completely, Kodaira shares a few points between them so they can spend summer break together.
9	"July 13: A Stormy Group Lesson" "Shichigatsu Jū-san-nichi: Haran no Gōdō Jugyō" (Japanese: 7月13日 波乱の合同授業)	June 2, 2016
The girls have a cooking class taught by a strict teacher named Saginomiya, who is observant of the misfortunes of the Class 7 students. As Hibari feels downhearted after a mishap ruins her group's dish, Hanako and Botan come over to her house for a sleepover to cheer her up. The next day, as Saginomiya supervises a swimming class, Hanako gets stuck in the pool just as storm clouds approach. Despite Saginomiya's warnings, Hibari and Botan dive in to save Hanako from being struck by lightning, earning some praise from Saginomiya.
10	"July 20: Our Summer Vacation" "Shichigatsu Hatsuka: Watashi-tachi no Natsuyasumi" (Japanese: 7月20日 私たちの夏休み)	June 9, 2016
As summer vacation begins, the girls go to a karaoke box together, where Timothy drops a catchy rap number. The next day, Hanako and Hibari bump into a mysterious girl before joining the others at an indoor beach built by Botan's sister. Afterwards, as the girls go to a summer festival, Hanako and Hibiki become separated from the others and follow a shadow into the school, where they come across various scary things. Following the sound of Timothy's rap, the girls end up being chased by Timothy's legs to the rooftop, where they get a nice view of the fireworks.
11	"August 18: A Stormy Outdoor School" "Hachigatsu Jū-hachi-nichi: Arashi no Rinkan Gakkō" (Japanese: 8月18日 嵐の林間学校)	June 16, 2016
Class 7 goes on an outdoor school trip, where they start off with an arts and craft class making wood carvings. The next day, the students are thrown into an extreme game of tag in which they must recover their wood carvings and reunite with their teammates while avoiding Kodaira, Timothy, and his army of Mini-Timothys.
12	"August 19: A Happy Outdoor School" "Hachigatsu Jū-kyū-nichi: Shiawase na Rinkan Gakkō" (Japanese: 8月19日 幸せな林間学校)	June 23, 2016
As the tag game continues, both Hibiki and Ren end up getting captured by Kodaira and Timothy, but a team of Ren-infatuated animals manages to break them free. Meanwhile, Hanako and Hibari find themselves in trouble when the ground collapses underneath them, but Kodaira and Timothy manage to save everyone from falling. Although Hanako's team end up coming in last place and has to sleep outside as a result, Kodaira rewards them for finding all of their wood carvings by letting them use a hot spring that formed following the collapse.

=== Video game ===
Characters from the series appear alongside other Manga Time Kirara characters in the mobile RPG, Kirara Fantasia in 2018.

== Reception ==
=== Previews ===
Anime News Network had four editors review the first episode of the anime: Theron Martin gave praise to Silver Link and director Shin Oonuma for crafting a solid effort with sharp comedic direction, vibrant character artwork and movement, and an intriguing setting full of likable characters; Lynzee Loveridge commented on the show's debut being adequate with appropriate animation but middling humor, and added that the charm of the characters will determine the viewer's enjoyment; Rebecca Silverman was amused by the moe aesthetics and the characterization of both Hanako and Hibari but found the rest of the episode devoid of any substance and resembled more like every other gag manga adaptation. The fourth reviewer, Nick Creamer, commended the decent background art and light-hearted charm but said that the show doesn't do enough to distract viewers away from repetitious humor, generic characters and unearned moments of friendship and sincerity, concluding with: "Failing both in terms of humor and atmosphere, Anne-Happy counts as a pretty bottom-shelf genre entry."

=== Series ===
Allen Moody from THEM Anime Reviews found the series overall to be mediocre and boring, noting the main cast lacked intriguing personalities beyond their unlucky foibles, low comedic content and the absurd qualities of the Tennomifune Academy setting failing to grab viewers attention, concluding that both Non Non Biyori and Hidamari Sketch were better schoolgirl comedy recommendations.
