= Magia Record =

Japanese video game

- English logo

マギアレコード (Magia Rekōdo)
- Genre: Magical girl; Mystery; Psychological thriller
- Created by: Magica Quartet: Akiyuki Shinbo; Shaft; Gen Urobuchi; Ume Aoki
- Video game
- Developer: f4samurai
- Publisher: Aniplex
- Directed by: Kenji Taguchi (Arcs 1–2); Yuuto Hosokawa (Arc 2)
- Produced by: Yuusuke Toyama (Aniplex); Yoshiki Satou (f4samurai)
- Genre: Role-playing game
- Engine: Cocos2d-x
- Platform: Android, iOS, Windows
- Released: JP: August 22, 2017; NA: June 25, 2019
- Manga
- Written by: Fujino Fuji
- Published by: Houbunsha
- English publisher: NA: Yen Press
- Magazine: Manga Time Kirara Forward
- Original run: August 24, 2018 – present
- Volumes: 10
- Manga

Magia Record: Puella Magi Madoka Magica Side Story – Another Story
- Written by: U35
- Published by: Houbunsha
- English publisher: NA: Yen Press
- Imprint: Manga Time KR Comics
- Magazine: Comic Fuz
- Original run: May 25, 2019 – present
- Volumes: 2
- Anime television series
- Directed by: Doroinu (Note: Doroinu credited as "Gekidan Inu Curry (Doroinu)", with credit given as Chief Director (総監督)); Yukihiro Miyamoto (Note: Although the credit officially given to Miyamoto, Okada, and Yozhizawa is Director (ディレクター), the three basically acted as "series directors" for the episodes they're credited as such in place of Doroinu, who had no prior experience directing a full-length television anime. Miyamoto: Episodes 1, 11–13 Okada: Episodes 2–3, 6–7 Yoshizawa: Episodes 4–5, 8–10 Miyamoto also received an Assistant Director (副監督) credit for all episodes.); Kenjirou Okada; Midori Yoshizawa
- Produced by: Tatsuya Ishikawa (Aniplex); Hiroyuki Kobayashi (Houbunsha); Yoshiki Satō (f4samurai); Mitsutoshi Kubota (Shaft)
- Written by: Doroinu
- Music by: Takumi Ozawa
- Studio: Shaft
- Licensed by: NA: Aniplex of America; SEA: Plus Media Networks Asia
- Original network: Tokyo MX, GYT, GTV, BS11, MBS
- English network: SEA: Aniplus Asia
- Original run: January 4, 2020 – March 29, 2020
- Episodes: 13
- Anime television series

The Eve of Awakening
- Directed by: Doroinu; Yukihiro Miyamoto; Midori Yoshizawa (Note: Assistant Director (副監督). See the Shaft directors credit legend.)
- Produced by: Tatsuya Ishikawa (Aniplex); Hiroyuki Kobayashi (Houbunsha); Yoshiki Satō (f4samurai); Yasuhiro Okada (Shaft)
- Written by: Doroinu; Katsuhiko Takayama
- Music by: Takumi Ozawa
- Studio: Shaft
- Licensed by: NA: Aniplex of America; SEA: Plus Media Networks Asia
- Original network: Tokyo MX, GYT, GTV, BS11, MBS
- Original run: August 1, 2021 – September 26, 2021
- Episodes: 8
- Anime television series

Dawn of a Shallow Dream
- Directed by: Doroinu; Yukihiro Miyamoto; Midori Yoshizawa
- Produced by: Tatsuya Ishikawa (Aniplex); Hiroyuki Kobayashi (Houbunsha); Yoshiki Satō (f4samurai); Yasuhiro Okada (Shaft)
- Written by: Doroinu; Katsuhiko Takayama
- Music by: Takumi Ozawa
- Studio: Shaft
- Licensed by: NA: Aniplex of America; SEA: Plus Media Networks Asia
- Original network: Tokyo MX, MBS, AT-X
- Original run: April 3, 2022
- Episodes: 4
- icon

Magia Record: Puella Magi Madoka Magica Side Story (Japanese: マギアレコード 魔法少女まどか☆マギカ外伝, Hepburn: Magia Rekōdo: Mahō Shōjo Madoka Magika Gaiden) was a Japanese role-playing video game developed by f4samurai for Android and iOS, which was released by Aniplex in Japan on August 22, 2017. A North American version was available from June 2019 to October 2020. The game is a spin-off of the 2011 anime series Puella Magi Madoka Magica, and follows a new protagonist, Iroha Tamaki, who arrives in Kamihama City in search of her missing sister. The game closed its servers on July 31, 2024, and was replaced by Magia Exedra, a 3D gacha game with characters carried over from Magia Record.

A manga adaptation has been serialized in Manga Time Kirara Forward magazine since August 2018. A stage play adaptation was also produced in 2018. An anime television series adaptation of the game produced by Shaft aired for three seasons between January 2020 and April 2022.

== Gameplay ==
Magia Record is a turn-based tactical RPG that features battles with magical girls on the right side of the screen and witches/familiars on the left side. The player must attack enemies on the left side with magical girls that they have collected and chosen onto their team by choosing three of five attack disks found at the bottom of the screen. There are three types of attacks that the player can use: "Accele", which boosts Magic Points (MP); "Blast", which can target multiple enemies in a row or column; and "Charge", which boosts the impact of the attack following it. Attacks are automatically boosted if all three disks chosen are of the same type of command or are from the same character. After a magical girl attacks three times, the player can use an attack disk associated with that character and drag it to another magical girl on their team to "Connect" and add special effects on the receiving character, such as healing them. Magical girls are also able to use skills (found at the bottom right of the screen) and "Magia" (bottom left of the screen).

The game's main story is separated by chapters, which are further separated into episodes. Once an episode is completed, the player receives rewards, experience points for each magical girl in the team, and rank points from the battle and can replay the episode as well as move on to the next. If the player loses a battle in an episode, they can continue by using Magia Stones, one of the in-game currencies. One magical girl is automatically put onto a team, but the player can select up to three additional magical girls and a support girl, which can be received from the game's Fate Weave feature. The Fate Weave feature can also be used to gain Memoria. Completing Side Missions will reward the player with materials to enhance their magical girls or currency to purchase said material.

== Plot ==
Two story arcs have been released for Magia Record. The first arc consists of two parallel storylines; the Main Story, which follows Iroha and her dealing with the uwasa and the Magius, and the Another Story, a side story of the events in Kamihama City told from the perspective of the main characters of the original Puella Magi Madoka Magica anime. The second arc covers events after the resolution of the conflict with the Magius as Iroha deals with the kimochi, another phenomenon different from the uwasa and the witches.

=== Arc 1 ===
A creature named Kyubey has the power to grant girls a wish, but in exchange they must become magical girls and fight against creatures known as Witches. Soon, a rumor begins to spread among magical girls that they can be saved from their duty if they go to Kamihama City.

Iroha Tamaki, a girl who has forgotten the wish she made to become a magical girl, encounters a smaller Kyubey named Lil' Kyubey and remembers that she had wished to cure her younger sister Ui of her illness. After realizing that all evidence of Ui's existence has disappeared, she travels to Kamihama City in search of answers, where she meets Yachiyo Nanami, a veteran magical girl. Uncertain of how to proceed in her search for Ui, Iroha decides to investigate rumors in the hopes that they may provide clues to her whereabouts, and learns that they manifest as uwasa, creatures that resemble witches and have their own labyrinths. Over time, Iroha forms her own group of magical girls, consisting of herself as well as Yachiyo Nanami, Tsuruno Yui, Felicia Mitsuki, and Sana Futaba. However, her group comes into conflict with the Magius, a mysterious organization of magical girls who are dedicated to the "salvation" of magical girls and the protection of the uwasa. It is led by Alina Gray, Nemu Hiiragi, and Touka Satomi; the latter two were Ui's close friends, but now have no memory of her.

After Iroha and her group defeat several uwasa across Kamihama City, the Magius decide to take drastic measures. Mifuyu, a senior member and Yachiyo's former friend, orchestrates a plan to convince Iroha's group to join the Magius. She invites them to a lecture where they are informed about the true nature of magical girls; their soul gems are directly connected to their lives and they are fated to become witches themselves. Mifuyu also informs them that the Magius created the doppel system, which essentially circumvents their fate but is only in place in Kamihama City; as such, they plan to extend it across the entire world. Iroha disagrees with the group's methods and refuses to join them, but Felicia, Tsuruno, and Sana are brainwashed into joining. Yachiyo, who did not attend the lecture but was aware of the truth about magical girls, relents after learning that Iroha's group has been essentially been disbanded because of Mifuyu's actions, but Iroha helps her regain her resolve.

The Magius leaders decide to resort to more extreme methods, such as brainwashing their own members, causing a disillusioned Mifuyu to defect from the group and covertly dispel Felicia and Sana's brainwashing. Tsuruno is fused to an uwasa to harvest energy from people, but Iroha's group manages to return her to normal and meet up with Mitama Yakumo, planning to gather the city's magical girls at her place for their safety.

Kamihama City's magical girls head to the Magius' headquarters, which is inside an uwasa's labyrinth, to fight them head on and learn that they plan to lure the witch Walpurgisnacht to the city to have it fight against their creation, known as "Eve", in order to gather enough energy to expand the doppel system. Iroha learns that Eve and Ui are one and the same and manages to convince Nemu and Touka of Ui's existence. Alina unleashes Eve upon Kamihama City as planned and its magical girls regroup at the city's center to stop both Eve and Walpurgisnacht. Iroha successfully returns Ui to normal and Walpurgisnacht is finished off by a combined attack from Yachiyo and Iroha.

=== Arc 2 ===
The magical girls of Kamihama City form an alliance called the Kamihama Magia Union as Iroha deals with the kimochi, a creature different from uwasa and witches. The Promised Blood, another group of magical girls from outside the city, come to Kamihama to exact their grievances as remnants of the Magius regroup as the Neo-Magius.

=== Arc 2.5 ===
Following the events of Arc 2, Iroha, Ui, Touka, Nemu, and Lil' Kyubey recruit the magical girls in Kamihama City to learn about other magical girls throughout history:

- Tsuyu Mizuna and Chizuru, who lived during the Sengoku period
- Ebony, who served Cleopatra during the Battle of Actium
- Olga and Gunhild, Vikings who lived in Norway during the Battle of Stamford Bridge
- Heruka, a Tibetan who lived during the Mongol invasions of Tibet
- Toyo, the successor of the Yamatai queen Himiko
- Amaryllis, a Roman who lived in Pompeii during the eruption of Mount Vesuvius

== Development and release ==
The game was officially announced at the Shaft 40th anniversary "Madogatari" event in September 2016. The producer of the original anime series, Atsuhiro Iwakami stated, "Since it seems that it will take some more time until the anime's new work, the idea that I want to make a title that "Madoka Magica" is active will work. Ume Aoki, the character designer of the original anime series, was also responsible for the game's character designs, in which she designed more than 10 new and original characters for the game, including the main protagonist Iroha Tamaki. The opening animation and magical girl transformation scenes was produced by Shaft. The game is produced by Yusuke Toyama and Masaki Sato.

Magia Record was originally scheduled to be released in May 2017. However, it was pushed back to July and then again to its current release date, August 22, 2017. Aniplex of America produced an English version of Magia Record that was released in North America on June 25, 2019. A pre-registration campaign was held for its release, where at least 25,000 people pre-registered for the English release of the game. On August 28, 2020, it was announced that the North American version of the game would be shutting down at the end of the following month. The news was responded to negatively, with refunds for any microtransactions being refused. This was preceded by poor communication among the developers and players, alongside constant banners, which encouraged spending money. The end of service was later delayed to October 30 and a gallery mode update was made available to players who updated the app before the shutdown.

The Traditional Chinese server was released on December 19, 2018 and ceased operations on December 24, 2021. The Simplified Chinese server was released on October 13, 2020 and ceased operations on October 12, 2022.

On September 24, 2023, Aniplex announced that Puella Magi Madoka Magica Scene 0, a prequel to the original Puella Magi Madoka Magica series written by Vio Shimokura, would be released as part of the game. On May 31, 2024, it was announced that the game would end service in July 2024, with the PC version closing on July 1 and the iOS/Android version on July 31.

== Other media ==
=== Manga ===
A manga adaptation based on Magia Record illustrated by Fujino Fuji has been serialized in Manga Time Kirara Forward magazine since August 24, 2018. Yen Press is publishing the series in English.

=== Stage play ===
The game also inspired a stage play adaptation that was produced from August 24 to September 9, 2018. The characters were portrayed by the Japanese idol group girl Hiragana Keyakizaka46. The Blu-ray and DVD for the stage adaptation was released on February 27, 2019.

=== Anime ===
An anime television series adaptation by Shaft was announced in September 2018. It aired between January 4 and March 28, 2020, on Tokyo MX, GYT, GTV, BS11, and MBS. The series is directed and written by Doroinu of Gekidan Inu Curry, with Yukihiro Miyamoto serving as assistant director, Junichirō Taniguchi serving as character designer, and Takumi Ozawa composing the series' music. Akiyuki Shinbo serves as animation supervisor. The cast reprise their roles from the game. TrySail performed the series' opening theme song "Gomakashi" (ごまかし), while ClariS performed the series' ending theme song "Alethea" (アリシア, Arishia). Aniplex of America has licensed the series, and began streaming the series on FunimationNow and AnimeLab from January 4, and on Crunchyroll and Hidive from January 11. In Southeast Asia, Plus Media Networks Asia aired a simulcast on Aniplus Asia. The first season ran for 13 episodes, with a second season announced at the end of the first season's final episode. In Italy, the series was simulcast on VVVVID.

The second season, titled The Eve of Awakening (覚醒前夜, Kakusei Zen'ya), aired from August 1 to September 26, 2021. ClariS performed the second season's opening theme song "Careless" (ケアレス, Kearesu), while TrySail performed the second season's ending theme song "Lapis".

The third and final season, titled Dawn of a Shallow Dream (浅き夢の暁, Asaki Yume no Akatsuki), was originally set to premiere at the end of 2021, but was delayed due to production issues. It aired on April 3, 2022, with all four episodes airing back-to-back. ClariS and TrySail performed the third season's ending theme song "Orgel" (オルゴール, Orugōru; Music Box).

== Notes ==
=== Works cited ===
- Maeda, Hisashi; Nakagami, Yoshikatsu; Kawabata, Takeshi; Nishitani, Nanako (2020). マギアレコード 魔法少女まどか☆マギカ外伝 TVアニメ公式ガイドブック 1巻 [Magia Record Puella Magi Madoka Magica TV Anime Official Guidebook Volume 1] (in Japanese). Houbunsha. ISBN 978-4832272019.
