= Manga Time Kirara Forward =

Japanese manga magazine

- Cover of the June 2007 issue
- Categories: Seinen manga
- Frequency: Monthly
- Circulation: 50,000 (2019)
- First issue: Special issue of Manga Time Kirara in March 2006; October 2007 (released in August 2007)
- Company: Houbunsha
- Country: Japan
- Language: Japanese
- Website: Manga Time Kirara Forward Web

Manga Time Kirara Forward (まんがタイムきららフォワード, Manga Taimu Kirara Fowādo) is a Japanese seinen manga magazine published by Houbunsha. The magazine is sold on the 24th of each month. Forward was the fourth magazine in the Manga Time Kirara line to be published, the first three being Manga Time Kirara, Manga Time Kirara Carat, and Manga Time Kirara Max. It differs from its sister magazines in that it is the only one to not feature 4-Koma manga. The first issue was released on March 23rd 2006 as a special edition of Manga Time Kirara. The first independent issue was released on August 24, 2007.

== Manga serialized ==
- Anne Happy
- Dōjin Work
- Ededen!
- Gakkō Gurashi!
- Hanayamata
- Harukana Receive
- Hōkago Saitensei!
- Ichinensei ni Nacchattara
- Itoshi no Karin
- Kannonji Suiren no Kunou
- Kimi to Boku o Tsunagu Mono
- Mahōtsukai Rosé no Sado Life (ongoing)
- Oninagi
- Puella Magi Kazumi Magica
- Puella Magi Suzune Magica
- S Senjō no Tena
- Slow Loop (ongoing)
- Tamayomi (ongoing)
- The Anemone Feels the Heat
- Tomoe Mami no Heibon no Nichijou
- Tonari no Kashiwagi-san
- Yumekui Merry
- Yurucamp (until 2019, moved to Comic Fuz)

== Anime adaptations ==
- Yumekui Merry – Winter 2011
- Hanayamata – Summer 2014
- Gakkō Gurashi! – Summer 2015
- Anne Happy – Spring 2016
- Yurucamp – Winter 2018
- Harukana Receive – Summer 2018
- Tamayomi – Spring 2020
- Yurucamp Season 2 – Winter 2021
- Slow Loop – Winter 2022
- Mahōtsukai Rosé no Sado Life – TBA

== Live-action film and drama adaptations ==
- Gakkō Gurashi! – Winter 2019
- Yurucamp – Winter 2020
- Yurucamp 2 – Spring 2021

== Game adaptations ==
- Hanayamata: Yosakoi Live! – November 13, 2014
- Hanayamata: Yosakoi Puzzle! – April 26, 2015
- Kirara Fantasia – December 11, 2017
- Yurucamp Virtual – Winter 2021

== See also ==
- Manga Time Kirara
- Manga Time Kirara Carat
- Manga Time Kirara Max
