= Puella Magi Madoka Magica: Beginnings and Eternal =

2012 Japanese anime films

- Puella Magi Madoka Magica: Beginnings; Puella Magi Madoka Magica: Eternal
- Promotional poster featuring the main characters (clockwise from the top left: Kyoko Sakura, Homura Akemi, Madoka Kaname, Sayaka Miki, Kyubey and Mami Tomoe)
- 劇場版 魔法少女まどか☆マギカ［前編］始まりの物語; Gekijōban Mahō Shōjo Madoka Magika [Zenpen]: Hajimari no Monogatari; 劇場版 魔法少女まどか☆マギカ［後編］永遠の物語; Gekijōban Mahō Shōjo Madoka Magika [Kōhen]: Eien no Monogatari
- Type: Film series
- Genre: Dark fantasy; Magical girl
- Created by: Magica Quartet: Akiyuki Shinbo; Gen Urobuchi; Ume Aoki; Shaft
- Directed by: Akiyuki Shinbo (Note: Chief Director (総監督).); Yukihiro Miyamoto; Hiroyuki Terao (Note: Assistant Director (副監督). See the Shaft director credits legend.)
- Screenplay by: Gen Urobuchi (Note: Parts of the screenplay related to the witches and labyrinths were revised by Doroinu and 2shiroinu, the members of Gekidan Inu Curry, without credit.)
- Character designers: Takahiro Kishida; Junichirou Taniguchi
- Music by: Yuki Kajiura

Production
- Art director: Ken Naitou
- Sound director: Youta Tsuruoka
- Cinematographer: Shinichirou Etou
- Color designers: Hitoshi Hibino; Izumi Takizawa
- Editor: Rie Matsubara
- Animation producer: Yasuhiro Okada
- Studio: Shaft
- Producers: Atsuhiro Iwakami; Hiroyuki Kobayashi; Osamu Hosokawa; Yoshinao Doi; Kozue Kaneniwa; Hirō Maruyama
- Production companies: Madoka Movie Project; Aniplex; Houbunsha; Hakuhodo DY Media Partners; Nitroplus; Shaft; Movic; MBS
- Distributor: Aniplex
- Runtime: 130 minutes (Beginnings); 110 minutes (Eternal)

Original release
- Release: October 6, 2012 (Beginnings); October 13, 2012 (Eternal)

Puella Magi Madoka Magica: Beginnings (Note: Puella Magi Madoka Magica: Beginnings (Japanese: 劇場版 魔法少女まどか☆マギカ[前編] 始まりの物語, Hepburn: Gekijōban Mahō Shōjo Madoka Magika (Zenpen): Hajimari no Monogatari)) and Puella Magi Madoka Magica: Eternal (Note: Puella Magi Madoka Magica: Eternal (Japanese: 劇場版 魔法少女まどか☆マギカ[後編] 永遠の物語, Hepburn: Gekijōban Mahō Shōjo Madoka Magika (Kōhen): Eien no Monogatari)) are two 2012 Japanese animated dark fantasy action films produced by Aniplex and Shaft based on the titular 2011 anime television series. Beginnings and Eternal were released in October 2012 and serve as a recap of the television series with redone voice acting and newly animated footage. The films are distributed in North America by Aniplex of America.

A sequel to the films, Puella Magi Madoka Magica: Rebellion, was released in October 2013. A fourth film, Puella Magi Madoka Magica: Walpurgisnacht: Rising, was released in August 2026.

== Plot ==
In Puella Magi Madoka Magica, certain creatures can grant a chosen girl any wish they may desire. In exchange for that wish, the girl must become a magical girl who must fight against witches, creatures born from despair caused by accidents, disease, and suicide. In the fictional city of Mitakihara, a girl named Madoka Kaname is approached by a cat-like creature named Kyubey with the offer of becoming a magical girl. Meanwhile, another magical girl named Homura Akemi seeks to do everything in her power to stop Madoka from becoming one. Madoka soon learns that the life of a magical girl is not the dreamlike fantasy she imagined and is instead filled with sadness and despair.

=== Beginnings ===
In Mitakihara city, a girl named Madoka Kaname meets a new transfer student, Homura Akemi, who coldly warns her to remain as she is lest she risk losing everything. Later that day, Madoka and her friend Sayaka Miki are shopping when they find themselves protecting a strange cat-like creature named Kyubey from Homura. They are caught in a mystical barrier and approached by strange monsters, but are rescued by Mami Tomoe. Madoka and Sayaka learn Mami is a magical girl who fights demonic beings called witches, who spread curses and despair on human beings. Kyubey offers the two girls the opportunity to also become magical girls: in return for forging a contract and having a wish granted, they gain a Soul Gem—the source of their magic—and are tasked with hunting down witches. Killing a witch leaves behind Grief Seeds, which they may use to replenish and purify their Soul Gems. Homura, a magical girl herself with the ability to seemingly appear out of nowhere, is strongly against Madoka making a contract, but Madoka, wanting to help others, almost does so after being inspired by Mami. However, Madoka reconsiders after witnessing Mami's brutal death while fighting a witch named Charlotte. Sayaka becomes a magical girl to heal the debilitating injury afflicting her childhood friend, Kyosuke Kamijo. Sayaka soon comes into conflict with another magical girl named Kyoko Sakura, whom Homura recruits to deal with a powerful witch named Walpurgisnacht, who will appear and devastate Mitakihara in two weeks.

When Madoka learns that Sayaka and Kyoko are fighting on a highway bridge, she intervenes by throwing Sayaka's Soul Gem onto a passing truck, which carries it away and causes Sayaka to immediately fall dead. This reveals the horrifying truth: the Soul Gems used by magical girls are their actual souls, extracted from their bodies by Kyubey after forging the contract. Kyubey describes the process as turning their bodies into mere "hardware" controlled by their Soul Gems, which are usually kept close to them at all times, and allows their bodies to better endure the hardship of battle. The destruction of the Soul Gem also means permanent death for a magical girl, and they must locate Grief Seeds from defeated witches or risk running out of magic and being unable to maintain their bodies. When her Soul Gem is recovered, Sayaka revives and is horrified. Kyubey expresses flat confusion at their reactions, reasoning that the contract is fair and the process is logically sound. Kyoko later tries to help Sayaka cope by telling her of her own experience, in which her wish inadvertently destroyed her family. However, Sayaka falls deeper into despair after learning that her classmate and friend, Hitomi Shizuki, plans to confess her own love to Kyosuke. After Kyubey tells her that she has more magical potential than any girl it has ever seen, Madoka nearly forges a contract to restore Sayaka to normal, but is stopped seconds before when Homura manages to kill Kyubey. The close call causes Homura to break down, tearfully begging Madoka not to be so foolishly selfless, before Madoka runs off to find Sayaka. As Madoka leaves, another Kyubey appears and Homura calls it by its true name: Incubator. Elsewhere, Kyoko finds Sayaka, now fully sunken in despair. Sayaka's Soul Gem completely darkens and explodes into a Grief Seed. As darkness flows out of the Grief Seed, Kyubey muses how a "magical girl" is what they call the juvenile form of a "witch".

=== Eternal ===
Homura saves Kyoko and Sayaka's lifeless body from the newly emerged witch Oktavia von Seckendorff, revealing that the witch is Sayaka herself: magical girls whose Soul Gems become fully tainted by succumbing to despair become witches, and their Soul Gems become Grief Seeds. Kyubey explains that he is part of an emotionless alien species called "Incubators" who have long used human teenage girls in this manner because the transformation into witches produces massive amounts of energy, which they collect to ward against the inevitable heat death of the universe. Kyoko, spurred on by Kyubey and hoping for a chance to restore Sayaka, takes Madoka with her to try and reach Oktavia. The attempt ultimately fails, with Kyoko sacrificing herself to end Sayaka's suffering. Kyubey, having known that reversing the process was impossible, taunts Homura, saying that without Sayaka and Kyoko she has no chance of stopping Walpurgisnacht without Madoka also becoming a magical girl, something Kyubey wishes to happen in order to harness Madoka's mysteriously enormous potential energy. It is then revealed that Homura's true ability is time manipulation, and that she is from another timeline: Initially a shy student who was rescued by Madoka in magical girl form, and witnessing her demise, Homura forged a contract with Kyubey with the intention of redoing the past to prevent Madoka from becoming a magical girl and save her from her fate. She has relived the one-month period leading up to Walpurgisnacht numerous times in the hopes of saving Madoka, with each attempt ending in failure. With this new information, Kyubey deduces that it is Homura's actions that have caused Madoka to possess the massive potential energy from multiple reset timelines to become the greatest of all magical girls and subsequently a witch whose power dwarfs Walpurgisnacht.

Determined to save Madoka, Homura faces Walpurgisnacht alone, but is ultimately defeated and pushed to the brink of despair, reasoning that resetting time any further will only make Madoka's fate worse. Madoka arrives and comforts Homura, becoming a magical girl with the wish to have the ability to save magical girls across all time from their despair before they can become witches. The paradoxical nature of her wish causes her to transcend into a psychopomp form, and establishes a new "Law of Cycles" in which magical girls are purified and disappear into a higher plane instead of becoming witches. The result of the wish causes Madoka's human existence to become erased from reality, with only Homura remembering her. Madoka assures Homura that this is for the best and thanks her, now knowing the full extent of their friendship across numerous timelines. Homura awakens to find herself in a reality where Mami and Kyoko are still alive, as the three of them now hunt new monsters called "Wraiths", and no one else remembers Madoka. Homura describes the previous reality to Kyubey and vows to continue protecting the world Madoka cherished.

== Production ==
The original anime television series of Puella Magi Madoka Magica was created as a collaboration between director Akiyuki Shinbo, artist Ume Aoki, writer Gen Urobuchi (Nitroplus), and animation studio Shaft with Atsuhiro Iwakami (Aniplex) as lead producer. The series had music by Yuki Kajiura and designs adapted for animation by Takahiro Kishida, and Yukihiro Miyamoto later joined during production as the series director, with Shinbo instead taking on the role of chief director. In November 2011, it was announced in the December issue of Kadokawa Shoten's Newtype magazine that a three-part theatrical film project was in development by Shaft. The first film, Puella Magi Madoka Magica Part 1: Beginnings (劇場版 魔法少女まどか☆マギカ[前編] 始まりの物語, Gekijōban Mahō Shōjo Madoka Magika (Zenpen): Hajimari no Monogatari), covers the first eight episodes of the anime series. The film was released in Japanese theaters on October 6, 2012. The second film, Puella Magi Madoka Magica Part 2: Eternal (劇場版 魔法少女まどか☆マギカ[後編] 永遠の物語, Gekijōban Mahō Shōjo Madoka Magika (Kōhen): Eien no Monogatari), covers the final four episodes of the anime series. The film was released in Japanese theaters on October 13, 2012. The films feature redone voices and some scenes with new animation. They were screened in selected locations in the United States and seven other countries between October 2012 and February 2013, as well as screened at Anime Festival Asia between November 10–11, 2012 in Singapore. The films were released on Blu-ray Disc and DVD on July 30, 2013, in standard and collector's edition sets and is available for import by Aniplex of America. The films were re-released by Aniplex USA with an English dub on Blu-ray Disc and DVD on July 15, 2014.

The opening theme for the films is "Luminous" (ルミナス, Ruminasu) by ClariS, which was released on October 10, 2012. The ending theme for the first film is "Magia (quattro)" by Kalafina, and the second film's ending theme is "Hikari Furu" (ひかりふる; "Light Falling") by Kalafina, which was released on October 24, 2012.

Shinbo intended for the two compilation films to be much like those found in the Space Battleship Yamato franchise. One of the primary difficulties he had with this approach was that he states he is not good at compiling existing footage and using it. Rather than cutting and compiling existing footage, he would rather think of new cuts or rethink the storyboard entirely. To assist with the process, Shinbo conferred with film editor Rie Matsuubara about how much and where they could condense the series and made suggestions and recommendations from there. While production was soon underway, Miyamoto was not asked to be the director of the films until sometime in October 2011 when Shaft's president, Mitsutoshi Kubota, happened to encounter Miyamoto at a convenience store near the Shaft office and asked him to be the director, which he agreed to.

Like with the television series, Takahiro Kishida was not heavily involved after the character design work, and for the films was even less involved as his designs were slightly tweaked by Doga Kobo animator Junichirou Taniguchi, who was one of the chief animation directors of the series in his place. Taniguchi reminisced that he did not recall how he got the job, but that he had simply continued receiving copyright illustration work for the series until he eventually was. Hiroki Yamamura replaced Mika Takahashi from the television series as Taniguchi's co-chief animation director, and likewise joked that he was unsure of how he got the job aside from Shaft continuing to give him work.

Art designer Seiji Oohara, returning from the television series as well, noted the many changes in art design and direction from the television series. Many of the changes were already in Shinbo's mind according to Oohara, but they were unable to use much of it simply due to the production schedule. With the films, they were given enough time to make various said changes. The art direction itself was also more refined by Studio Tulip's Ken Naitou, who had taken over as art director halfway through the television series.

== Other media ==
- Puella Magi Madoka Magica: Beginnings and Eternal
- Anime television series

Beginnings / Eternal TV Edition
- Directed by: Eita Higashikubo (Note: Credited as TV Edition Director (TV Edition ディレクター) in episodes 1–3, and TV Edition Editing Manager (TV Edition 編集担当) in episodes 4–11.)
- Written by: Gen Urobuchi
- Music by: Yuki Kajiura
- Studio: Shaft
- Original run: October 12, 2025 – December 21, 2025
- Episodes: 11

A film comic adaptation, titled Puella Magi Madoka Magica: Film Memories, went on sale on May 26, 2012. An action-adventure video game based on the films, Puella Magi Madoka Magica: The Battle Pentagram, was released in Japan on December 12, 2013, for the PlayStation Vita. The game follows an alternate plotline to the films, in which Madoka makes a wish that all the magical girls could work together and defeat Walpurgisnacht.

A television version edit of the movies aired from October 12 to December 21, 2025.

== Reception ==
Beginnings grossed more than ¥500 million at the Japanese box office. The Blu-ray Disc edition of the films sold over 80,000 in its first week.

== See also ==
- List of films featuring time loops

== Notes ==
=== Works cited ===
- Quartet, Magica (2013). 劇場版 魔法少女まどか☆マギカ [前編]始まりの物語/[後編]永遠の物語 公式ガイドブック with you. [Puella Magi Madoka Magica The Movie [Part 1] Beginning / [Part 2] Eternal Official Guidebook with you.]. Houbunsha. ISBN 978-4832243323.
- Kizawa, Yukito; Takayama, Atsushi; Saitou, Fusano, eds. (2014). 劇場版魔法やまどかマギカ[新編]叛逆の物語公式ガイドブック only you. [Movie Version Puella Magi Madoka Magica [New Edition] Story of Rebellion Official Guidebook only you.]. Houbunsha. ISBN 978-4832244290.
- Magica Quartet (2021). 魔法少女まどか☆マギカ 10th Anniversary Book Vol. 2 [Puella Magi Madoka Magica 10th Anniversary Book Volume 2]. Houbunsha. ISBN 978-4832273108.
