= Sarah Anne Williams =

American voice actress

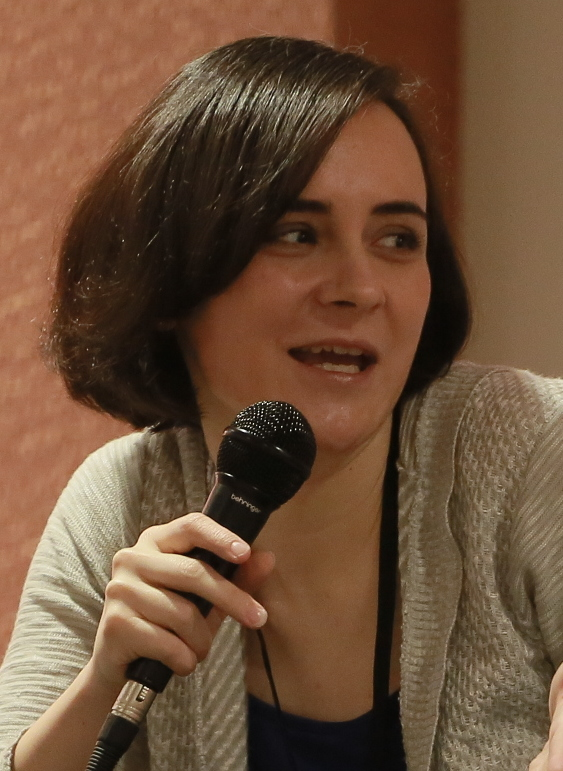
- Williams at Animate Miami in 2015
- Born: Indiana, U.S.
- Occupation: Voice actress
- Years active: 2009–present

Sarah Anne Williams is an American voice actress. She currently resides in Los Angeles. In anime, she is known for her performances as Nonon Jakuzure in Kill la Kill, Sayaka Miki in Puella Magi Madoka Magica, Lisbeth in Sword Art Online, Neferpitou in Hunter × Hunter, Felix Argyle in Re:Zero − Starting Life in Another World, Karin Miyoshi in Yuki Yuna is a Hero, Yuniko Kozuki in Accel World, E.M. Pino in Edens Zero, and Susamaru in Demon Slayer: Kimetsu no Yaiba. In video games, she voiced Jinx in League of Legends, Uni / Black Sister in the Hyperdimension Neptunia series, Echo in Mobius Final Fantasy, Jack Frost in Shin Megami Tensei IV: Apocalypse, Sigewinne in Genshin Impact, Chihaya Mifune in Persona 5, Peacock in Skullgirls, and Mist in Fire Emblem Heroes.

== Filmography ==
=== Anime ===
Year	Title	Role	Notes	Source
2011	Squid Girl	Ayumi Tokita	Season 1	
2012	Puella Magi Madoka Magica	Sayaka Miki		
2012	Nura: Rise of the Yokai Clan	Sannokuchi		
2013–19	Sword Art Online series	Rika Shinozaki / Lisbeth	3 TV series and OVA	
2013	Accel World	Yuniko Kozuki		
2014–15	Kill la Kill	Nonon Jakuzure	Also OVA	
2015	Coppelion	Shion Ozu		
2015	Magi: The Kingdom of Magic	Myron Alexius		
2015	Yuki Yuna is a Hero	Karin Miyoshi		
2015	Hyperdimension Neptunia: The Animation	Uni/Black Sister		
2015	A Lull in the Sea	Sayu Hisanuma		
2016	Charlotte	Mishima		
2016	Your Lie In April	Satsuki		
2016–17	The Asterisk War	Saya Sasamiya		
2017	Berserk	Puck	2016 version	
2017	Rio: Rainbow Gate	Linda		
2017	Little Witch Academia	Merryl Cavendish, Constanze's Stanbots		
2017	Fate/Apocrypha	Berserker of Black		
2018–19	Hunter x Hunter	Neferpitou		
2018–19	Kakegurui	Midari Ikishima		
2018–present	Re:Zero − Starting Life in Another World	Felix Argyle, Milde Irlam		
2018	Dragon Pilot: Hisone and Masotan	Nao Kaizaki		
2018	Persona 5: The Animation	Chihaya Mifune, Yumeko Mogami, Alice	2020 Aniplex dub	
2018	Granblue Fantasy The Animation	Cagliostro		
2019	Mob Psycho 100 II	Potato Girl		
2019	Sailor Moon	Sailor Star Healer	Viz Media dub; Sailor Stars	
2019	Naruto: Shippuden	Tsukune	Studiopolis dub	
2019	Boruto: Naruto Next Generations	Mirai Sarutobi		
2019	The Case Files of Lord El-Melloi II	Yvette L. Lehrman		
2019	Kemono Friends	Tsuchinoko	2019 Discotek Media dub	
2019	Didn't I Say to Make My Abilities Average in the Next Life?!	Mile	Crunchyroll dub	
2019–20	Demon Slayer: Kimetsu no Yaiba	Susamaru	Episodes 8–10	
2019	Kengan Ashura	Miki Takemaru, Ume		
2019	Teasing Master Takagi-san	Sanae Tsukimoto	Season 2	
2019	Gundam Build Divers Re:Rise	Sagari		
2019	Welcome to Demon School! Iruma-kun	Dosanko, Suzie Stolas, Educational Heart Demon		
2020	Beyblade Burst Rise	Pheng Hope		
2020	Monster Girl Doctor	Lorna Arte		
2020–present	Rent-A-Girlfriend	Ruka Sarashina		
2020	Gleipnir	Miko Aihara		
2021	Adachi and Shimamura	Akira Hino	Funimation dub	
2021	Full Dive	Mizarisa	Funimation dub	
2021	To Your Eternity	March	Crunchyroll dub	
2021	Edens Zero	E.M. Pino	Netflix dub	
2021	Dropout Idol Fruit Tart	Roko Sekino	Funimation dub	
2021	2.43: Seiin High School Boys Volleyball Team	Itoko Kuroba	Funimation dub	
2021	Mieruko-chan	Hitoe	Funimation dub	
2021–present	Seirei Gensouki: Spirit Chronicles	Miharu Ayase	Crunchyroll dub	
2021–present	Jujutsu Kaisen	Akari Nitta, Ui Ui, Mimiko Hasaba		
2022	Komi Can't Communicate	Himiko Agari, Satou Amami	Netflix dub	
2022	Kakegurui Twin	Midari Ikishima		
2022	PuraOre! Pride of Orange	Keiko Nohara		
2024	Dandadan	Miko		

=== Animation ===
Year	Title	Role	Notes	Source
2016–18	Barbie Dreamtopia: The Series	Hazel / Sapphire		
2019	YooHoo to the Rescue	Gina		
2020	Hello Kitty and Friends Supercute Adventures	Hello Kitty, Pochi		
2020	Death Battle	Crona	Episode 134: "Venom VS Crona"	
2022	Destruna	Peka-Bot, Kat		
2022	Hello Kitty: Super Style!	Hello Kitty		

=== Film ===
Year	Title	Role	Notes	Source
2015	Five Nights at Freddy's: The Musical	Chica		
2015	Puella Magi Madoka Magica: The Movie - Rebellion	Sayaka Miki		
2016	Barbie: Star Light Adventure	Kareena / Sheena		
2017	Sword Art Online The Movie: Ordinal Scale	Rika Shinozaki / Lisbeth		
2017	Barbie Dreamtopia: Festival of Fun	Sapphire		
2018	Accel World: Infinite Burst	Yuniko Kozuki		
2018	Shopkins: Wild	Bianca Banana		
2018	Hells	Kiki	2018 Discotek Media dub	
2018	Liz and the Blue Bird	Natsuki Nakagawa		
2019	Sound! Euphonium: The Movie – Our Promise: A Brand New Day	Natsuki Nakagawa		
2020	Ride Your Wave	Yoko Hinageshi		
2020	Seek	Lonely Child		

=== Web series ===
List of voice performances in web series
Year	Title	Role	Notes	Source
2015–20	Final Fantasy VII: Machinabridged	Tifa Lockhart	A TeamFourStar abridged series	

=== Video games ===
Year	Title	Role	Notes	Source
2012	Skullgirls	Peacock		
2012	Mugen Souls	Welsh Cocott		
2013	Time and Eternity	Reijo		
2013	The Guided Fate Paradox	Lanael Shiratori		
2013–present	League of Legends	Jinx		
2014	The Witch and the Hundred Knight	Metallia	Also Revival Edition	
2014	Natural Doctrine	Mel		
2015	Atelier Shallie: Alchemists of the Dusk Sea	Shallotte Elminus	Also Plus Version	
2015	Atlantica Online	Mistress of the Blade		
2016	Megadimension Neptunia VII	Uni / Black Sister		
2016	Mugen Souls Z	Welsh Cocott		
2016	Trillion: God of Destruction	Perpell		
2016	Undead Darlings	Tsukarechan		
2016	Colopl Rune Story	Rika / Chimari / Amora / Melodia		
2016	Street Fighter V	Santamu		
2016	Kingdom Warriors	Cao Chong / Huang Yueying		
2016	Cayne	Hadley		
2016	Mobius Final Fantasy	Echo		
2016	MeiQ: Labyrinth of Death	Setia		
2016	Shin Megami Tensei IV: Apocalypse	Napaea / King Frost / Jack Frost		
2016	Shadowverse	Losaria	Also additional cards	
2016	2064: Read Only Memories	Jess		
2016	Akiba's Beat	Nana Nanao		
2016–17	Monster Strike	Galileo / Vamprowler / Nokko		
2017	Nier: Automata	Additional voices		
2017	Fire Emblem Heroes	Mist / Laevatein		
2017	Persona 5	Chihaya Mifune / Jack Frost / Jack O' Lantern	Also Persona 5 Royal	
2017	Dark Rose Valkyrie	Amal Franson		
2017	Mary Skelter: Nightmares	Rapunzel		
2017	Battle Chef Brigade	Maradain, Knife, Quetzal, Pontida		
2017	Zwei: The Ilvard Insurrection	Pipiro / Penguin Girl / Annette		
2017	Regalia: Of Men and Monarchs	Addie		
2018	Zwei: The Arges Adventure	Pipiro		
2018	BlazBlue: Cross Tag Battle	Linne		
2018	God Wars: The Complete Legend	Orihime / Inaba / Otohime		
2018-19	MapleStory	Angelic Buster / Sanaan / Empress Cygnus / Hilla / Pathfinder		
2018	Maplestory 2	Heavy Gunner (Female)		
2018	Fist of the North Star: Lost Paradise	Yuria, additional voices		
2018	Monster Prom	Polly Geist / Vicky		
2018	Valkyria Chronicles 4	Chiara Rocino / Lily		
2019	Death end re;Quest	Lydia Nolan		
2019	God Eater 3	Lulu / Sho		
2019	Dragon Star Varnir	Chiquita / Nyamo / young Zephy		
2019	Pokémon Masters	Whitney, Clair		
2019	River City Girls	Mami		
2019	Conception Plus: Maidens of the Twelve Stars	Mana		
2019	Tangle Tower	Fifi Fellow		
2019	Mary Skelter 2	Rapunzel		
2019	The TakeOver	Megan		
2020	Death end re;Quest 2	Lydia Nolan		
2020	Granblue Fantasy Versus	Cagliostro		
2021	Re:Zero − Starting Life in Another World: The Prophecy of the Throne	Felix Argyle		
2021	Persona 5 Strikers	Additional voices		
2021	Shin Megami Tensei III: Nocturne HD Remaster	Blond Child		
2021	Guilty Gear Strive	Erica Bartholomew		
2021	Mary Skelter Finale	Rapunzel		
2021	Demon Slayer: Kimetsu no Yaiba – The Hinokami Chronicles	Susamaru		
2021	Muv-Luv: Project Mikhail	Mikoto Yoroi		
2021	Shin Megami Tensei V	Demeter / Manananggal / Alice / Jack Frost		
2022	Mobile Legends: Bang Bang	Melissa		
2022	Triangle Strategy	Giovanna		
2022	Phantom Breaker: Omnia	M		
2022	Soul Hackers 2	Jack Frost/Ai-ho		
2022	Freedom Planet 2	Aaa		
2022	River City Girls 2	Chris, Mami, Edwina		
2023	Fire Emblem Engage	Marni / Madeline		
2023	Neptunia: Sisters VS Sisters	Uni / Black Sister		
2023	Advance Wars 1+2: Re-Boot Camp	Lash		
2023	Master Detective Archives: Rain Code	Additional voices		
2023	Genshin Impact	Sigewinne		
2023	Punishing: Gray Raven	No.21		
2023	Disgaea 7: Vows of the Virtueless	Yubana		
2023	Granblue Fantasy Versus: Rising	Cagliostro		
2024	Granblue Fantasy: Relink	Cagliostro		
2024	Persona 3 Reload	Additional voices		
2024	The Legend of Heroes: Trails Through Daybreak	Celis Ortesia, citizens		
2024	Romancing SaGa 2: Revenge of the Seven	Frosti/Imperial Blacksmith		
2025	The Legend of Heroes: Trails Through Daybreak II	Celis Ortesia, citizens		
2025	Raidou Remastered: The Mystery of the Soulless Army	Additional voices		
