= Kyoko Sakura =

Puella Magi Madoka Magica character

- Puella Magi Madoka Magica character
- Kyoko Sakura, artwork by Ume Aoki
- First appearance: "Miracles and Magic Are Real"
- Created by: Akiyuki Shinbo; Gen Urobuchi; Ume Aoki
- Designed by: Ume Aoki; Takahiro Kishida
- Portrayed by: Kyōko Saitō (Magia Record stage play)
- Voiced by: Japanese: Ai Nonaka; English: Lauren Landa

In-universe information
- Species: Human (initially); Magical girl
- Gender: Female
- Relatives: Momo Sakura (sister, deceased)
- Weapon: Spear (transforms into a weapon resembling a three-section staff or a chain whip)
- Religious Affiliation: Christianity, New Religious Movement/Heresy

Kyoko Sakura (Japanese: 佐倉 杏子, Hepburn: Sakura Kyōko) is a fictional character from the 2011 anime series Puella Magi Madoka Magica. The daughter of a pastor, Kyoko is a magical girl from a poor family. Initially introduced as an aggressive and self-centered magical girl, Kyoko clashes with Sayaka Miki over their ideals of justice. As the story progresses, however, her views change and she sympathizes with Sayaka and tries to save her from despair. In Puella Magi Madoka Magica the Movie: Rebellion, Kyoko has a friendlier personality, and fights with her fellow magical girls against surreal monsters called Nightmares. Kyoko's past and her relationship with Mami Tomoe have been explored in the manga spin-off, Puella Magi Madoka Magica: The Different Story. She has appeared in several Puella Magi Madoka Magica-related media, including manga, novel adaptation and video games.

Series writer Gen Urobuchi originally created Kyoko as a rival to Sayaka; although both characters make similar wishes and experience similar situations, they develop different personalities. Kyoko was designed by Ume Aoki, who wanted to distinguish her from the characters. Takahiro Kishida adapted Aoki's original design and added a number of features to the character. She is voiced by Ai Nonaka in Japanese, and by Lauren Landa in English.

Critical response to Kyoko Sakura has been favorable, with critics calling her character interesting and praising her backstory. Her similarity and relationship with Sayaka have also earned positive response, and the character has also been the subject of analysis. Kyoko has been popular, having placed highly in several popularity polls, and many different pieces of merchandise related to her, such as figures, plush dolls and keychains have been released.

== Characteristics ==
Within the canon of Madoka Magica, Kyoko is a loner magical girl from Kazamino. She has long raspberry hair, blood red eyes, fangs and a voracious appetite, rarely seen without food. Kyoko is the daughter of a pastor who was excommunicated for heresy. She and her family nearly starve to death after her father's excommunication, which forces her to steal food so they can all survive. Kyoko makes a contract with Kyubey, a messenger of magic, as her wish is for her father to obtain more followers. Her father goes insane when he learns this, killing Kyoko's mother and younger sister Momo as well as himself, leaving only Kyoko alive to "mentally" torment her. She decides to use her magic only for herself, since using it for others causes severe danger. Kyoko is initially introduced as an aggressive and self-centered magical girl, but adopts a sympathetic outlook after clashing with Sayaka Miki. Kyoko has been a magical girl longer than the other girls in the series, and is more skillful. She uses a spear which can extend itself, split into several sections, and produce a ball at the end of a chain which can constrict and hit others. Kyoko can also erect barriers, to protect others or keep them from interfering.

== Appearances ==
=== In Madoka Magica ===
Kyoko is an experienced magical girl who first comes to the city of Mitakihara in the fourth episode of Madoka Magica, after Mami's demise. She initially clashes with Sayaka, trying to murder her due to their different ideals of justice. Kyoko learns here that her soul is no longer attached to her body, but is inside her soul gem (the source of their magic). When Sayaka's soul gem is tainted with negative emotions, Kyoko sympathizes with her and tries to protect her from despair, therefore, the two put aside their differences. Sayaka reminds Kyoko of her old self; wanting to stop Sayaka from making the same mistake as she did, Kyoko tells her to live a life of selfishness. Although Sayaka thanks Kyoko and admits that she misunderstood her, she refuses to abandon her ideals of justice.

After Sayaka's soul is tainted further and she becomes Oktavia, Kyoko is determined to save her and restore her to normal. She becomes tired of her pain, renounces her previous ideals, abandons her self-preservation, and chooses to kill herself and Oktavia in an attempt to both find peace in death and make sure that Sayaka will not die alone. Kyoko overloads her soul gem to create a massive explosion that kills them both. Kyoko's sacrifice leaves only Homura Akemi and Madoka Kaname to face the powerful witch Walpurgisnacht in the finale of the series. In a previous timeline Kyoko was killed by Mami, who was driven to kill all the fellow magical girls after learning that they would become witches. In the final timeline, Kyoko survives because Madoka rewrites the universe. Here, she mourns Sayaka's death in battle, lamenting that they had "finally become friends".

In Puella Magi Madoka Magica the Movie: Rebellion, Kyoko appears as a Mitakihara middle-school student and fights with her fellow magical girls against surreal monsters known as Nightmares. She is friendlier to Sayaka, and lives in her house. It is revealed that Homura has become a witch and created a barrier in her soul gem, and Kyoko and the other magical girls were pulled inside this barrier and were implanted with false memories. They save Homura by destroying her barrier, but in the process Homura steals Ultimate Madoka's powers and rewrites the universe before proclaiming herself as the devil. Despite becoming the devil, she gives everyone happy lives in her new world, with Kyoko shown smiling and becoming friends with Sayaka at the end of the movie.

=== In other media ===
In addition to the main series, Kyoko appears in several manga related to Madoka Magica. She is the main protagonist alongside Mami Tomoe in the Puella Magi Madoka Magica: The Different Story manga, which reveals that Kyoko was Mami's partner and had illusion magic (from her wish to deceive) which enabled her to make copies of herself. Kyoko subconsciously loses her illusion magic after the death of her family and decides to be more selfish, ending her partnership with Mami. She also appears in the Puella Magi Madoka Magica: Wraith Arc manga, set between the Eternal and Rebellion films, where she fights the wraiths with Mami and Homura. In Puella Magi Oriko Magica Kyoko meets a young girl named Yuma Chitose, whose parents were killed by a witch, and takes her under her wing. She is described in Michiru Kazusa's diary as fighting with Yuuri Asuka in Puella Magi Kazumi Magica: The Innocent Malice. Kyoko also appears in a novel adaptation of the original series written by Hajime Ninomae, illustrated by Yūpon and published by Nitroplus. She also appears in manga adaptation of the anime series, written and illustrated by Honakogae, and published by Houbunsha.

Kyoko is a playable character in nearly every Madoka Magica video game, including Puella Magi Madoka Magica Portable (the 2012 PlayStation Portable action game developed by Namco Bandai Games) and the 2013 PlayStation Vita game Puella Magi Madoka Magica: The Battle Pentagram. She also appears with Sayaka in the third-person shooter (TPS) Puella Magi Madoka Magica TPS Featuring Sayaka Miki & Sakura Kyoko (2012). Kyoko is a playable character in Magia Record, and was played by Kyōko Saitō in its stage play version. In the anime adaptation of Magia Record, Kyoko appears in Kamihama city to hunt witches since the witches in her area have been decreasing. She then joins the Wings of Magius, a group that wants to liberate magical girls from their fate, but later abandons the group due to their "vague" words about the magical girls. Kyoko also appears in several Madoka Magica pachinko games, including Slot Puella Magi Madoka Magica (2013), Slot Puella Magi Madoka Magica 2 (2016), CR Pachinko Puella Magi Madoka Magica (2017), SLOT Puella Magi Madoka Magica A (2017), and Slot Puella Magi Madoka Magica the Movie: Rebellion (2019). The character also appears in several crossover games, such as Kaden Shoujo, Chain Chronicle, Million Arthur, Girl Friend Note, Phantom of the Kill, and Puyo Puyo Quest. A drama CD written by Gen Urobuchi that details Kyoko's backstory was also released.

== Creation and design ==
Kyoko was created by writer Gen Urobuchi and director Akiyuki Shinbo, and designed by Ume Aoki. Urobuchi created the character as a foil to Sayaka Miki. Both make similar wishes: wishing for someone else, while fighting for justice. When their wishes go wrong, they develop different personalities; as Kyoko abandons her ideals of justice and begins fighting selfishly for herself, while Sayaka refuses to abandon her ideals and slowly despairs. For her role in Rebellion, director Shinbo described Kyoko as an Osamu Dezaki character, since Dezaki usually had a character in his anime who is similar to Kyoko, where the character guides the heroes. Shinbo said that he always wanted Kyoko to resemble characters like Toru Rikiishi from Ashita no Joe and Long John Silver from Treasure Island.

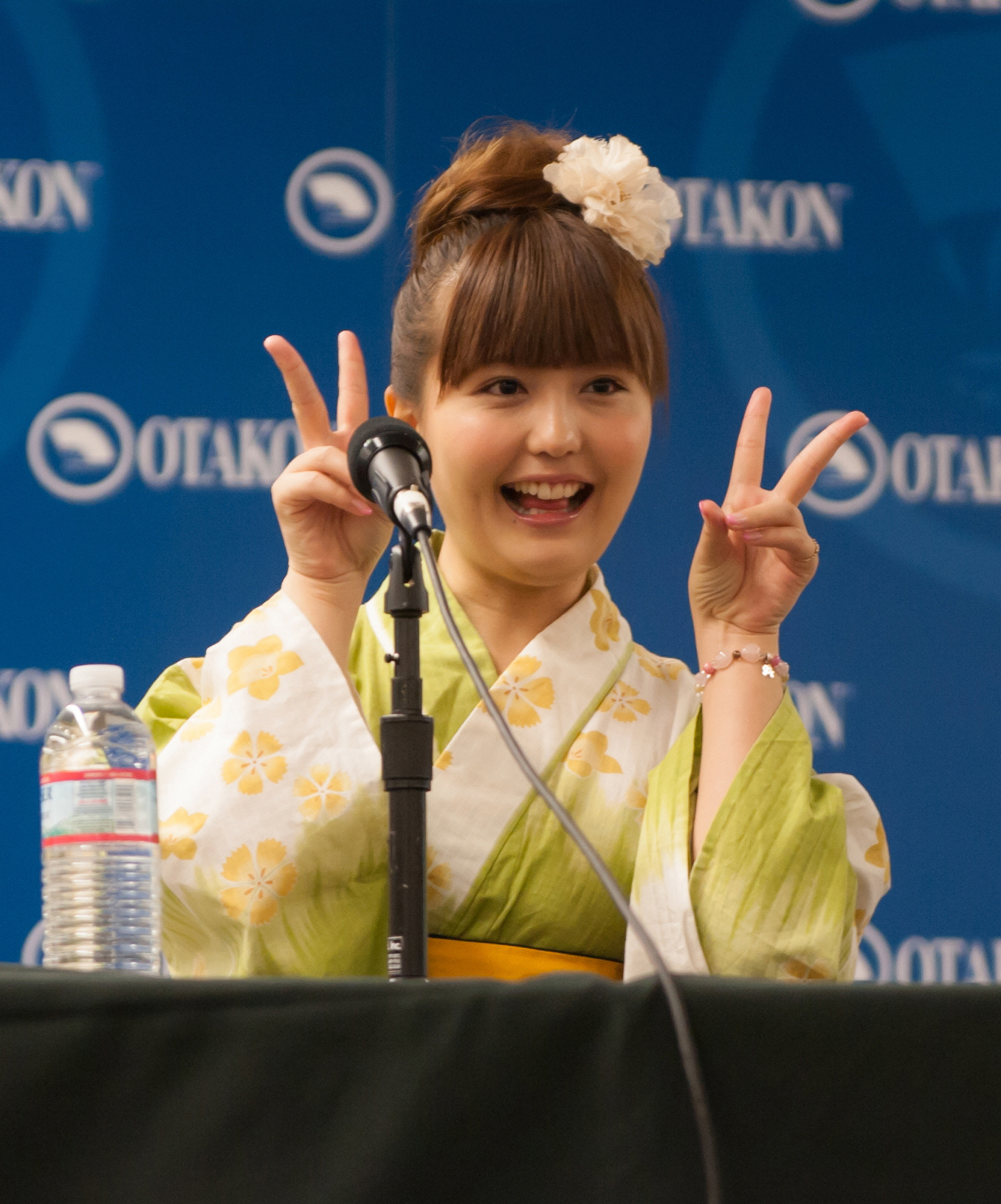
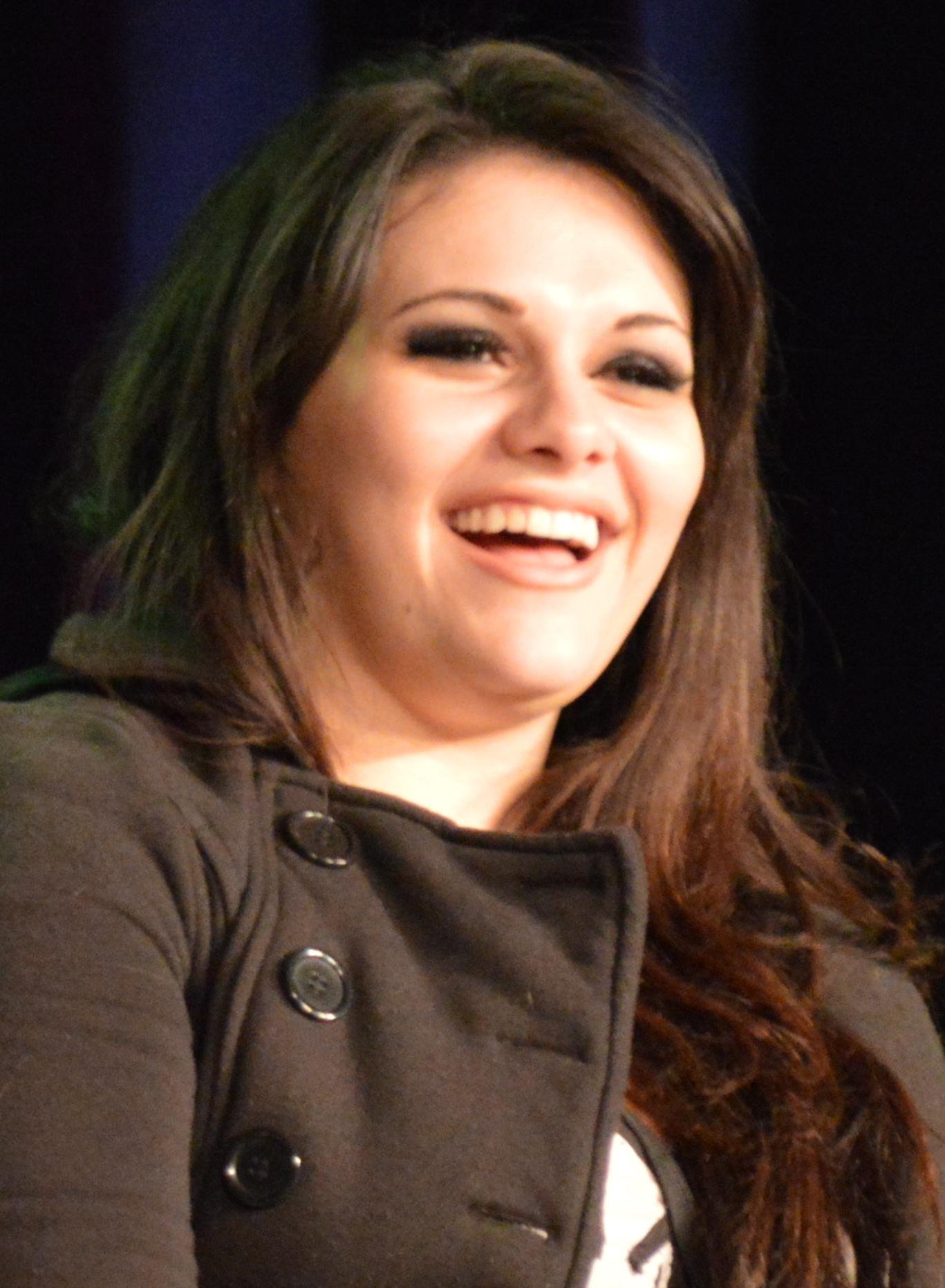
Ai Nonaka (left) and Lauren Landa, Kyoko's voice actresses in the Japanese and English versions

Kyoko was the last character Aoki designed for Puella Magi Madoka Magica. Her color motif was initially yellow (as suggested by Urobuchi), but Aoki changed it to red; yellow was used instead for Mami Tomoe. The character's face was drawn quickly as Aoki read the series' screenplay. The costume of each magical girl in the series was determined by their weapon, except for Kyoko; Aoki wanted her design to be distinguishable. She originally designed Kyoko with loose hair, but Takahiro Kishida changed her hairstyle to a ponytail and added sharp teeth because of the character's love of food. Urobuchi was surprised when he saw Kyoko's skirt (since the character moves a great deal), but said that it suits her.

In the Japanese version of the series, Kyoko is voiced by Ai Nonaka. Lauren Landa voices the character in the English dub. Landa described Kyoko as a "veteran" magical girl and the "badass" of the group, calling the character's knowledge of fighting witches and battle style "expert". Since Kyoko "ha[s] many different sides to her", such as an "emotional side", a "mischievous side" and a "dark side", Landa said it was "kind of an obstacle to play through each of these emotions" and found it the most difficult aspect of playing the character. Another difficulty was the "chomping noises" she had to do when Kyoko eats, but Landa also noted that she was able to "add a little bit more viciousness to it so it's kind of fun that way". Landa said that she enjoyed Kyoko's "badass" persona; the actress "absolutely fell in love with Kyoko", and had a "blast" working with the cast members.

== Cultural impact ==
=== Popularity ===
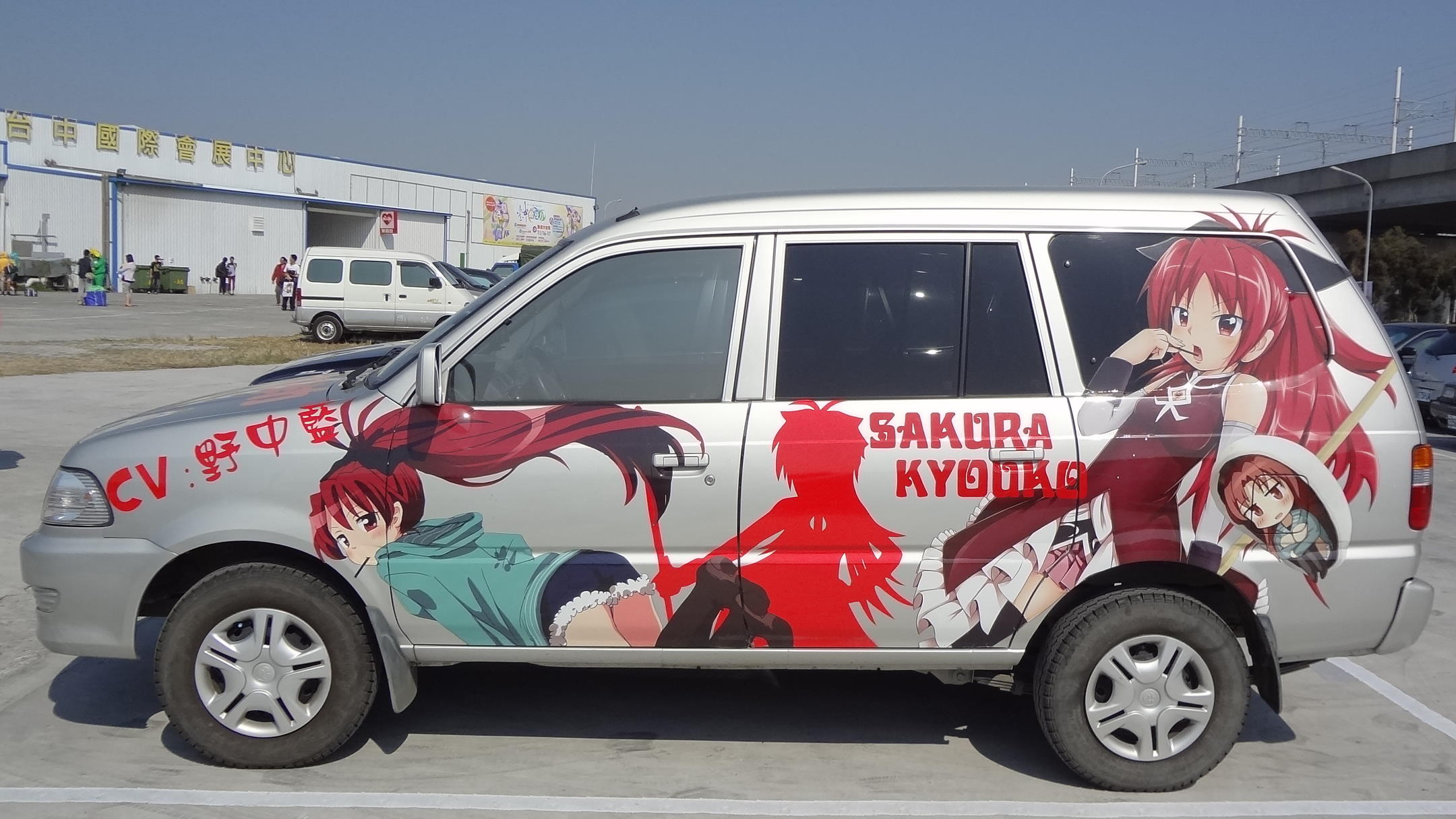
An itasha-Toyota car featuring Kyoko in Taichung, Taiwan

Kyoko has been well received by fans. She is one of Shaft's most popular heroines, placing fourth on its 2016 Top 10 Shaft Heroines list. Kyoko placed 11th, with 191 votes, in a Charapedia poll asking fans to list the 20 best anime magical girls. She topped the Akihabara fans' "Top 7 Red-Haired Anime Heroines" list, and was third on Charapedia's "Anime's Greatest Ponytails" list. Kyoko was the runner-up in the 2011 2chan's Anime Saimoe Tournament, with 3,380 votes. BIGLOBE users voted Kyoko their favorite sakura-related anime character. Lynzee Loveridge of Anime News Network ranked her second on ANN's Feistiest Female Redheads list; Loveridge called Kyoko "confident" and a character who would "gladly tear a threat limb from limb if she so much as finds them annoying." In a 2020 Ani Trending News poll, Kyoko was voted as the seventh best female anime character of Winter 2011.

Merchandise inspired by the character, such as keychains, has been designed. Figurines and nendoroids have also been produced. Kyoko-themed accessories, clothing and other products have been manufactured, and the character appeared on a poster for a Japanese guide dog-training organization. Kyoko also appeared on cover of taxi in Sapporo, as well as appearing in vending machines in the form of a doll.

=== Critical response ===
Critical response to the character has been favorable. Kory Cerjak of The Fandom Post called Kyoko the series' "most interesting character", praising her tragic story arc and strong personality. Cerjak wrote that her sacrifice for Sayaka and character development were "wonderful to watch", and called Lauren Landa's voice acting "fantastic". According to THEM Anime Reviews reviewer Tim Jones, Kyoko's "backstory is not only arguably the most developed after Homura, but explains her personality the best as well."

Describing her as the "sneering, confident redheaded magical girl", Zac Bertschy of Anime News Network stated that Kyoko represents "hardened cynicism and ruthless self-preservation" that fights for herself as opposed to Sayaka who is "fully dedicated to using her powers only to protect everyone around her", and said that their clash is "crucial" to the story. Rebecca Silverman of the same website said her backstory "might have fit better in 1692 Massachusetts" but also said "it helps to explain her attitude." Silverman also noted how Kyoko and Sayaka "serve as mirror characters to each other" as they had similar wishes that ends with similar results. Kyoko's Japanese voice actress, Ai Nonaka, has also been praised. Jones called her the "biggest surprise" for portraying the character's range of emotion and providing "some of the best performances" in the series, and Jacob Churosh of the same website also commended her "wide range of emotions" acting. Dan Barnett of UK Anime Network enjoyed Kyoko's interaction with Sayaka in Puella Magi Madoka Magica the Movie: Rebellion due to their relatively more carefree relationship, calling it "one of the truly joyous moments in the film".

Kyoko's portrayal in the spin-off manga The Different Story was praised by Rebecca Silverman, who called Kyoko's story "much more compelling" than Mami's; as the manga explains how Kyoko became the person she is in the anime, and said her story is "pretty heartbreaking". She noted that her wish was actually selfless, and Mami and Kyoko were "more than strong enough to make for an interesting story on their own." In his review of Magia Record anime series, James Beckett of Anime News Network enjoyed Kyoko's interaction with Felicia Mitsuki, and noted her appearance as it feels like a fanservice. Beckett, liked her appearance more in the next episodes since "she had more stuff to do."

=== Analysis ===
Kyoko has also been analyzed. In his book, Revelations: An In-Depth Look at the Themes and Symbols of Puella Magi Madoka Magica, Bryan J. McAfee called the character "profoundly lonely" and "scarred by the belief that she was responsible for the death of her own family"; stating that although she has an opportunity to flee and return with Homura to "put Sayaka down", she decides to kill herself with Sayaka because she is haunted by her past and feels regretful for her family's death. Gen Urobuchi said that Kyoko sees herself in Sayaka. If she can save Sayaka from despair, she can also save herself; if she abandons Sayaka, she will fall into suicidal despair. Japanese psychologist Takashi Tomita said that Kyoko is the type of person who acts intuitively and has a personality that is easily influenced by emotions. Tomita analyzed that her selfish behavior at the time of her initial appearance was also a social mask that was inevitably suffering from past experience. He observed that Kyoko actually likes humans and is the type of person who is kind and friendly to them. Kory Cerjak called Kyoko's similarity to Sayaka tragic, and wrote that they made the same mistake by making a wish for someone else; stating that Kyoko has "been hurt by the very wish she made", but "she still has some hope inside of her" as she fights witches and collects grief seeds to survive. He wrote, "Kyoko sees a bit of herself in Sayaka and it reminds her of the magical girl with a gleam in her eyes she once was." Michael Pementel of Bloody Disgusting called Kyoko "a magical girl who fights witches for her own needs", as opposed to Mami "who embraces the concept of fighting to protect others". Zac Bertschy called Kyoko a "cruel Darwinism".

Writing for The Very Soil: An Unauthorized Critical Study of Puella Magi Madoka Magica, Jen A. Blue asserts that "Kyoko blames herself for her own family's death because she wished to save them, even though she was helping them, and it was only her father's choice to refuse to listen or try to understand that killed them", saying her "guilt is relatively common in people who experience grief, loss, and trauma", stating that Kyoko shows symptoms of post-traumatic stress disorder. Blue also said Kyoko "shows few outward signs of depression at first glance, but the previous episode made quite clear that she has totally cut herself off from humanity, burying herself in self-indulgence of her hedonistic impulses in order to escape the pain of her past." Noting the symptoms of eating disorder to the character, Blue also said Kyoko is Sayaka "who expresses her depression outwardly".
