= Homura Akemi =

Puella Magi Madoka Magica character

- Puella Magi Madoka Magica character
- Homura Akemi in Magia Record with her shield magic, artwork by Sasagi Koushi
- First appearance: "As If I Met Her in My Dream..."
- Created by: Gen Urobuchi; Akiyuki Shinbo; Ume Aoki
- Designed by: Ume Aoki; Takahiro Kishida
- Portrayed by: Hina Kawata (Magia Record stage play)
- Voiced by: Japanese: Chiwa Saitō; English: Cristina Vee

In-universe information
- Species: Human (initially); Magical girl (formerly); Devil (currently); Goddess (currently)
- Gender: Female
- Weapon: Round shield (also used as a time travel and pocket universe device); Guns (especially firearms); Explosive weapons; Bow

Homura Akemi (Japanese: 暁美 ほむら, Hepburn: Akemi Homura) is a fictional character in the 2011 Japanese anime television series Puella Magi Madoka Magica. A mysterious magical girl who first appears in one of Madoka Kaname's nightmares, Homura tries her best to prevent Madoka from making a contract with the messenger of magic, Kyubey. As the story progresses, it is revealed that Homura is a time traveler and has seen Madoka die countless times whenever she makes a contract with Kyubey. Homura becomes the sole main protagonist of the 2013 sequel film Puella Magi Madoka Magica the Movie: Rebellion, where she fights with her fellow magical girls against surreal monsters called Nightmares, but after some time, she realizes something is wrong with her memories and then tries to investigate. Homura has appeared in most Puella Magi Madoka Magica related media, including manga, novel adaptations of the series, and video games.

Writer Gen Urobuchi created Homura to contrast with the series' titular character, Madoka Kaname. He developed her role as a mysterious character who would reveal the truth about magical girls' fate as the series progresses. Urobuchi expanded Homura's character in Rebellion, where he said the film is about the character growing and struggling with internal conflict. Ume Aoki, who designed her, wanted to express Homura's dark beauty through her design. She is voiced in Japanese by Chiwa Saitō and in English by Cristina Vee.

Homura has received overwhelmingly positive reception from critics, who praised the depth and complexity of her character as well as her relationship with Madoka. Her backstory revealed in episode 10 was also highly commended. Homura's role in Rebellion has earned praise from critics, who enjoyed the focus on her character and development. Homura has also been the subject of studies by literary scholars. She has ranked highly on various polls for best female anime character conducted by several publications such as Newtype, NHK and GooRanking. Merchandise based on her such as figures, plush dolls and replicas of her ear cuff has also been created.

== Conception and creation ==
=== Development ===
Series' writer Gen Urobuchi created Homura as a contrast to the series' titular character, Madoka Kaname. While Madoka is a character who could move forward at the beginning of the series, she started moving as the series progresses. Homura is a character who stops at one place and is unable to move forward because of her time-loop, where she constantly turns back time to save Madoka from her fate. Urobuchi noted that Homura has repeated nearly 100 timelines to save Madoka from her fate. He avoided portraying Homura's family, as he felt that depicting them would not affect the story, and they were "unnecessary" compared to Madoka's family who play an important part in the story, particularly her mother, Junko Kaname. Although the series is named after the titular protagonist Madoka and the story is about her growth and her wish to become a magical girl, Urobuchi said that Homura feels like the real protagonist of the series. He described Homura's role at the end of the series as that of an "evangelist", the only person in the world who understands Madoka's existence and importance.

Urobuchi said he developed Homura's role as another "veteran magical girl aside from Mami Tomoe", saying that she holds the answers to various mysteries in the series, and as it progresses, she will be the one to reveal the truth about magical girl's fate with Kyubey. While developing her time-manipulation power, Urobuchi explained that Homura's magic shield contains a sand timer that can manipulate time for at least one month, and if the sand on the shield disappears, she cannot manipulate time anymore, but can still travel back in time. He admitted that he did not think enough about how her shield works, making the nature of her shield magic a mystery. Urobuchi was not fond of giving her the shield as her only weapon, but he came to like it after seeing the storyboard where Homura pulled multiple guns and explosives from the shield. He also regarded Homura as the strongest magical girl "as long as no one discovers how she uses her powers".

Homura's character was expanded in the 2013 sequel film, Puella Magi Madoka Magica the Movie: Rebellion, where she becomes the film's main protagonist. Urobuchi originally planned to end the film with Homura reuniting with Madoka and ascending to heaven. Director Akiyuki Shinbo and producer Atsuhiro Iwakami rejected that ending since they wanted to expand the franchise. This made it difficult for Urobuchi to come up with an ending. Urobuchi was also worried about ending with Homura ascending along Madoka, saying it would not be a happy one for Homura's character since she would disappear instantly. He also wanted to create an ending where Madoka escapes from her fate as a god, since a middle-school girl becoming a god is too much to bear. Urobuchi said it was difficult to write an ending for the film until Shinbo came to him and suggested the idea of Homura "confronting Madoka as an enemy", which motivated Urobuchi to write and develop the film's ending. He said he agreed with this idea because he believes Homura might be "plausible as Madoka's equal opposite".

Another theme Urobuchi wanted to convey was Homura's growth. He said Homura has thrown her confusion away in the movie and by doing this she grows up like a strong heroine. Urobuchi said the film is about Homura growing and changing, and feared whether people would accept her evolved character or reject it and call her out-of character. Urobuchi said he would be happy if people accepted Madoka Magica as a series where characters grow and change, though that is up to the viewers to decide. In an interview with mangaka Kazuo Koike, Urobuchi said after developing the Rebellion film he had a stronger impression of Homura in the movie than he imagined before. Describing her as "rebellious", he said that although Homura proclaims herself as a Demon, she is undergoing an internal conflict.

=== Design ===
Homura's devil outfit illustrated by Ume Aoki

Ume Aoki designed Homura. Urobuchi chose the character's purple color motif, and Aoki designed it according to him. Aoki tried to let Homura "shine through in her design", and said that her "silky long hair" is the most distinguishing part of her design. When designing the character for her magical girl outfit, Aoki kept Homura's "personality and combat style in mind" and immediately found her a fascinating character. She described Homura's magical girl design as "rather monochromatic". For the school uniform, she had Homura wear black tights that provide the same feeling as her magical girl outfit, and said the character "gives off the air of a silent beauty". The anime staff designed Homura's weapons, while her bow, used in the final episode, is based on an illustration drawn by Ume Aoki. Urobuchi did not originally write the pair of black wings Homura sprouts in the series' final episode in the script. Production designers Gekidan Inu Curry added this detail. Urobuchi was happy with the addition as it added more "mystery and depth" to the character.

For Puella Magi Madoka Magica the Movie: Rebellion, Junichiro Taniguchi, the film's character designer and one of the chief animation directors, said that it was difficult to create the designs for Homura's devil outfit because the character wears pierced earrings that were not included in the initial design. Hiroki Yamamura, the other chief animation director, described the difficulty in drawing Homura, saying it was hard for him to add emotions to her stoic face, acknowledging he would make mistakes drawing Homura's face to the point that he gave himself a headache.

=== Voice actresses ===
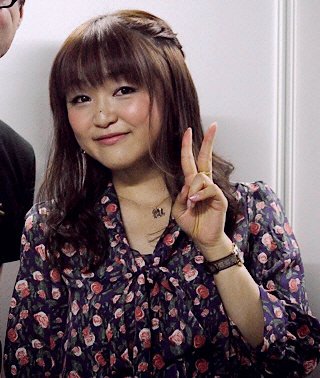
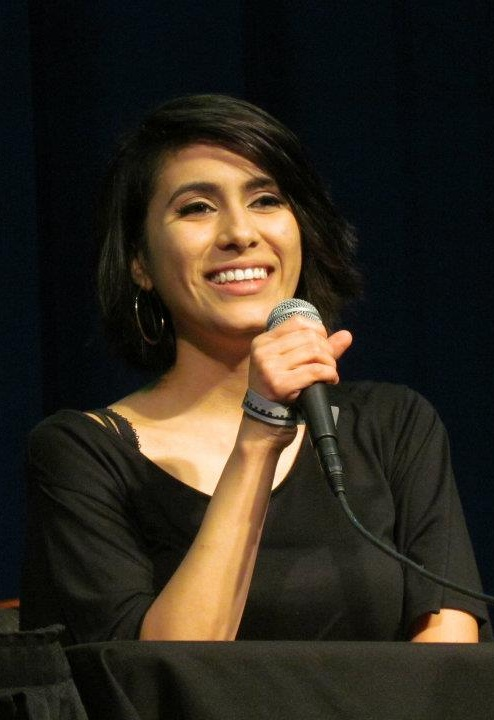
Chiwa Saitō (left) and Cristina Vee (right), the voice actress' of Homura in Japanese and English versions, respectively

In the Japanese version, Chiwa Saitō voices Homura. Saitō was originally considered as the voice for Kyubey, but she felt she "sounded too stupid" when trying to voice him. She then tried voicing Kyosuke Kamijo until Urobuchi suggested she try to voice Homura. Saitō said she felt very honored to undertake the role for Homura. Saitō said it was "tough" to share the character's pain and loneliness, and she found it "very difficult" to demonstrate these emotions. She also said it made the acting worthy, and called Homura an adorable character. Urobuchi liked Saitō's voicing for Homura because she gives the character a feeling of a "Dark Beauty" style. Saitō also identified with Homura's character explaining, "I can't speak about my worries and often keep them to myself which most of the time leads to me thinking negatively, this part I think is quite similar to Homura".

Before the audition, Shinbo was worried about Saitō taking on the role of Homura because when he listened to her voice, the image of another character, Hitagi Senjogahara, from Bakemonogatari, who is also voiced by Saitō, and which he directed, comes to mind. He commented: "I had this concern that no matter what, I still get the impression that Homura and Hitagi look similar". He thought it would be better to bring in another actress for the character. However, after hearing Saitō voicing Homura during the audition, Shinbo was finally convinced of the choice and said, "This is it". He praised Saitō's acting in episode 10, saying it was "beyond expectation"; praising her for portraying the character's scream and strong emotions.

For Puella Magi Madoka Magica the Movie: Rebellion, Saitō recalls that she was very tired when she first read the film's script, saying that the number of details overwhelmed her. Saitō said that whenever she's involved in a Madoka Magica project, she feels she does not want to lose and while listening to her recording as Homura in the film, Saito sometimes feels she has "to fix [her voice] more". Saitō described Homura as "a human person who has a conflict [within herself]". She said Homura is a person who finds answers "with a lot of conflict", and expressed that she sympathized with Homura's path. According to Saitō, Homura's feelings "are stronger in giving than in getting ".

Homura is voiced by Cristina Vee in the English dub. At the beginning, when Vee tried to voice Homura, she knew nothing about her character. She thought Homura would be a "monotone" character like Yuki Nagato from Haruhi Suzumiya. Vee said she wanted to play her "monotone" but after learning about Homura's character said she is "not monotone at all and she has a lot going on under the surface so trying to find that and keep the voice but at the same time she's very controlled"; this was the most difficult part of "finding her character".

In 2012, Vee said Homura is the most "complex" character she has voiced. In 2019, she said that Homura was her "most challenging role". She also said it was one of her "first very meaty roles" and that she was still "very young" when she voiced the character, and continues saying "it was like the Olympics of acting, because of all the changes and transitions, and all the emotions that are shown, but not really, because she plays it cool". Vee believes her role as Homura is "going to live on for a very long time", explaining "this franchise ... it's so powerful, and in a lot of ways very real, if that makes sense".

== Appearances ==
=== In Puella Magi Madoka Magica ===
Homura Akemi first appears in a dream as one of Madoka Kaname's nightmares. She transfers into her school as a mysterious girl the day after the dream. Homura has long, silky, black raven hair, and flat purple eyes and is said to be an attractive person by her classmates. She is impeccably great at everything she does whether it is academics or sports, making her instantly popular despite her cold behavior. After Madoka and her friend Sayaka Miki come into contact with magical girl Mami Tomoe and extraterrestrial being Kyubey, Homura is revealed to be a rival magical girl with a deep hatred towards Kyubey. It is revealed that Homura is a time traveler; she was originally a meek, timid, shy second-year student with low self-esteem, suffered from heart disease and did not have any friends. Madoka then befriends her. Eventually, Madoka and Mami reveal they are magical girls and save her from a witch (a surreal monster). When Mami dies in the fight with the rampaging witch Walpurgisnacht, Madoka sacrifices her life to stop it. Homura, overcome by grief and uselessness, contracts with Kyubey to become a person who can protect Madoka, just as Madoka protected her. Her wish is to be able to return to her original meeting with Madoka, leading Homura to receive the power to manipulate time to a certain extent.

Her magical weapon is a shield filled with sand that allows her to freeze time. However, this power becomes useless if she is physically restrained as she cannot turn her shield to activate it. She can also use the shield to block projectiles and store the infinite variety of weapons she carries. Since her shield and magic have no offensive capability, she attacks instead using stolen firearms and homemade explosives while time is stopped. None of the girls actually know what weapons she has, since she only uses them while time is stopped.

Caught up in a predestination paradox, she tries again and again to prevent Madoka from being killed or making a contract, but time after time fails to save her. After a timeline reset, Homura always returns to the hospital room she lived in before. After failing for so many times, she begins changing, growing colder and distant with people around her. After Madoka makes her wish and transcends into a cosmic phenomenon called "Law of Cycles" (円環の理, Enkan no Kotowari), that appears to all magical girls at the moment before they become witches, she rescues them by taking them to a heavenly paradise. She creates a new reality in which Homura is the only one who remembers her. Homura continues to fight in the new world against the wraiths, despite believing the world is irredeemably full of tragedies. It is a world that Madoka once tried to protect, and she vows never to forget Madoka's resolve. She inherits Madoka's bow—now a sleek ebony bow with a purple diamond setting—and arrows, along with a set of white wings.

=== In The Rebellion Story ===
In Puella Magi Madoka Magica: Rebellion, Homura fights with her fellow magical girls against new monsters called "Nightmares" (ナイトメア, Naitomea). However, after some time, Homura realizes something is strange about her memories and starts to investigate. She finds out eventually the Mitakihara city is an idealized world created by her subconscious while she is on the verge of becoming a witch and is being experimented on by Kyubey who wants to observe "Ultimate Madoka" (アルティメット・まどか, Arutimetto Madoka) that has become a concept. Homura chooses to become a witch without being guided by Ultimate Madoka to destroy Kyubey's scheme. Ultimate Madoka appears to take Homura to heaven. However, Homura starts usurping her and becomes Demon Homura (悪魔 ほむら, Akuma Homura), splitting her and her magical girl form, sealing her powers and rewriting the universe. She manages to enslave the Incubator race, who now work under her to take on the curses of the new world. Unlike Ultimate Madoka, who erased herself from physical existence after rewriting reality, Demon Homura can take human form in the new world and is not a magical girl in this form. Demon Homura's powers are sealed within her earring, which can change to and from a lizard form, and walk around on its own. Despite proclaiming herself as the devil, Madoka, Sayaka, Kyoko, Mami and Nagisa are all given happy lives in her new world. A post-credits scene shows a weary Homura seated in a chair watching over Mitakihara with a badly beaten and mentally scarred Kyubey nearby before she leans over a cliff and falls.

=== In Magia Record ===
Homura appears with her personality being that of a shy, timid, magical girl rather than her cold and strong personality. In the game, it is said that a time paradox caused the events of Magia Record that never happened in the anime series. The Homura in the game and main anime series are the same person but are walking different paths, with the former never going through the experience of Mami killing Kyoko, and Madoka asking Homura to kill her after promising to prevent her from contracting with Kyubey. In the game's story, after Mami disappears, Homura goes to Kamihama city with Madoka searching for her. They encounter the magical girl Alina Gray, who reveals she defeated Mami and fed her to one of her "grand masterpiece witch[es]", angering Homura and Madoka. They investigate an abandoned museum. Sayaka joins them but parts ways with them after a group called Wings of Magius attacks them.

After meeting Sayaka, she reveals to Homura and Madoka that the Magius brainwashed Mami, and they decide to search for her to rescue her. However, they meet Mami at Mitakihara city. She has become the "Saint of Kamihama", and traps them in a barrier with Alina's help. Kyoko comes and breaks the barrier and rescues them. However, when Homura is informed that Walpurgisnacht will be heading to Kamihama city due to the guidance of Magius, she thinks it would be better to stay at Mitakihara as she is afraid of facing it with Madoka. Madoka and her friends are determined to go to Kamihama city, so Homura decides to help them. After arriving in Kamihama, they meet with Mami, whose brainwash had been broken by Yachiyo Nanami, and they join her. Together, they face the Magius at Hotel Fenthope to stop them from sacrificing innocent people to achieve their goals in liberating magical girls. In the final battle, Homura fights against Walpurgisnacht with the magical girls in Kamihama city, and finally succeeds in defeating it; her final words in the battle are, "Goodbye, Walpurgisnacht". For the stage play adaptation of Magia Record, Hina Kawata of idol girl group Hiragana Keyakizaka46 portrayed Homura. She also appears in the manga adaptation of the game featured on the cover of the manga's second volume with Yachiyo Nanami.

=== Appearances in other media ===
A drama CD written by Gen Urobuchi that explores other aspects of Homura's character was released along with the anime series' Blu-ray disc. On the drama CD, Memories of You, it was revealed that Homura was the target of a bully in school due to her low self-esteem and fragile personality. Because of her weak psyche, she was easily bullied into depression and feels worthless to everyone. The drama CD also goes into more details about Homura and Madoka's relationship and their strong bond, and Madoka saving Homura from both Isabella (witch) and from her bully, as well as supporting Homura whenever she feels down.

Besides the main series, Homura has appeared in several manga's related to Puella Magi Madoka Magica media. She is a supporting character in the manga spin-off Puella Magi Madoka Magica: The Different Story, with her role being very much the same as that in the anime series, preventing Madoka from making a contract with Kyubey while also trying to negotiate with other magical girls to fight against the powerful witch Walpurgisnacht. In Puella Magi Oriko Magica, Homura kills the manga's main character, Oriko Mikune, because Oriko wants to kill Madoka to prevent her from becoming the worst witch. However, before she dies, Oriko manages to kill Madoka using the last power of her magic. Homura is shocked and in terror on seeing Madoka's body. She then resets the timeline again. In 2015, two spin-off manga series featuring Homura as the main character were announced: a four-panel fantasy slice-of-life comic titled Puella Magi Homura Tamura and Puella Magi Madoka Magica: Homura's Revenge, an alternate universe story where Madoka joined Homura in her time traveling. Homura also appears as the main heroine in the Puella Magi Madoka Magica: Wraith Arc manga, that takes place between the second film Eternal and the third film Rebellion. It is revealed that after Madoka rewrote the universe, Homura gained the ability to manipulate memories at her own will. She appears in a novel adaptation of the original series written by Hajime Ninomae, illustrated by Yūpon and published by Nitroplus, as well as appearing in a manga adaptation of the anime series, written and illustrated by Honakogae, and published by Houbunsha.

Homura is a playable character in most Puella Magi Madoka Magica video games, such as the PlayStation Portable action video game developed by Namco Bandai Games, Puella Magi Madoka Magica Portable (2012), and the PlayStation Vita title Puella Magi Madoka Magica: The Battle Pentagram (2013). Homura is the player character of Puella Magi Madoka Magica TPS featuring Homura Akemi, a third-person shooter video game for Android released in 2011. Homura also appears in several pachinko games related to the series, including Slot Puella Magi Madoka Magica (2013), Slot Puella Magi Madoka Magica 2 (2016), CR Pachinko Puella Magi Madoka Magica (2017), SLOT Puella Magi Madoka Magica A (2017), and the 2019 Slot Puella Magi Madoka Magica the Movie: Rebellion.

Homura is also a playable character in numerous games outside the Puella Magi Madoka Magica video games, such as Phantom of the Kill, Chain Chronicle, Million Arthur, and the rhythm game Girl Friend Note. Homura's magical girl costume appears as an alternative for the main character Milla Maxwell from Tales of Xillia 2, though the character does not appear. Her costume and weapons also appear in the game Phantasy Star Online 2, as well as the PSP game Gods Eater Burst, being available as downloadable content (DLC). Homura and her devil form appear together in the mobile game Puyo Puyo Quest. They also appear, along with a costume of her magical girl form, in the mobile game Unison League.

== Characterization and themes ==
Homura's actions are remarkably consistent. Whether or not she became a demon, in the end I don't think it mattered to her. It didn't matter whether she became a demon or an angel, if she lived or died; I think that if she could just go through with what she wanted to do, it would be enough for her. It was just that in the end, when she chose the best method, she happened to turn into a demon. That was all. In the final episode of the TV series, Madoka also chose the best method, and turned into the Law of Cycles. I think it's the same thing.

— Yuki Kajiura's opinion on Homura becoming a demon.

Homura appears initially as an ambiguous and mysterious figure, with little known about her story or motivations. She is calm and quiet and gave up being understood by others as a result of her repeated time loops. Homura was originally a weak, shy and timid girl who suffered from heart disease; she did not have any friends after being constantly in the hospital and has very low self-esteem. When Madoka saves her and forms a friendship with her, but then dies after fighting Walpurgis Night, Homura becomes obsessed and desperate to save her, but fails every time, and becomes cold and distant to the people around her. According to Chiwa Saitō and Aoi Yūki, Homura's love for Madoka is a feeling of dependence rather than attraction. When asked if Homura is in love with Madoka, Gen Urobuchi replied, "probably". He commented further on their relationship, explaining that "a really strong friendship turns into a lovelike-relationship without the sexual attraction." Akiyuki Shinbo also commented on Homura's love for Madoka in the Rebellion film, saying that Homura's love for Madoka is greater than romance—a feeling of friendship.

Despite appearing as a cold person with a strong personality, Saitō notes that Homura is actually quite fragile. According to Saitō, Homura's heart was quite shaken when she tried to kill Sayaka, and then showed her hysterical performance. Writer Jen A. Blue also observed that despite Homura's cold behavior and her determination to save Madoka at any cost, she "usually avoids hurting humans or magical girls and instead focuses on fighting witches and Kyubey", and is shown to care about people around her, such as Mami and Kyoko, "whom she ultimately trusts to kill Homulilly, come to respect and possibly even like them, as well". Urobuchi said that the dream world in Rebellion in which Homura dreamed up in her barrier represents the deepest part of her psyche, where she wanted to play and fight with her friends against the new monster called "Nightmares". Homura also created this because of her "wistful" thinking that fighting "Nightmares" is better than "Witches". Urobuchi and Shinbo defended Homura turning to a devil. Shinbo said that had Homura ascended with Madoka to heaven, the Incubators (Kyubey) would try to steal Madoka's power by experimenting on other magical girls, which would result in a bad ending. Urobuchi said Homura did not deny Madoka's wish. In 2019, Saito stated she liked "the purity of Homura's character", referring to it as her favorite moment in Rebellion.

== Cultural impact ==
=== Popularity ===
Kyubey, Homura, and Madoka featured on stairs at Akihabara

Homura has been extensively popular in Japan. She won the 1st Newtype Anime Awards for Best Female Character in 2011. In the 3rd and 4th Newtype anime awards in 2013 and 2014, she was voted the fourth-best female character. Homura won the 34th Animage Grand Prix Editors Choice award for the best female character of Animage in 2011. Japanese voice actress Sumire Uesaka cosplayed as Homura at the Comiket 85. BIGLOBE users voted Homura the most popular female black-haired heroine in 2013. In another BIGLOBE poll, Homura ranked first in the category Anime Girl that Attracts the Most Desperate Fanboys. In 2014, Nippon Telegraph and Telephone customers ranked Homura as their fifth-favorite black haired female anime character. Homura is also one of SHAFT's most popular heroines; she took second place for "Top 10 Shaft Heroines in 2016, three years after her debut in The Rebellion Story.

A reader poll conducted by NHK also determined that Homura is one of the best heroines, having garnered 14% of the votes. Additionally, in a 2016 Charapedia poll, Homura ranked first in the category of Most Alluring Transfer Students. In another Charapedia poll, Homura placed second for the most enchanting magical girl character, with the site's writer stating that Homura is "definitely one of the representative characters of magical girls in Japanese animation". In an Anime News Network poll—Which anime villain is most deserving of redemption—Homura ranked sixth for her role in Rebellion, with four percent of the votes. In a Japanese TV special from August 2017, Homura was voted as the 19th Most Splendid Heroine from the Heisei Era. In 2019, GooRanking voted Homura the best anime heroine of Heisei Era. In a 2020 Ani Trending News poll, Homura was voted as the best female anime character of Winter 2011, and the third best female character of the year (2011) overall. The same year, Homura was also voted the third best-magical girl character in a poll by Anime! Anime!. Both Homura and Madoka were referenced in the HBO series Euphoria.

=== Critical response ===
Madoka Magica's Homura Akemi is the best girl. If you haven't watched the anime series all the way through, perhaps that is not apparent. If you have and don't agree, probably, you are a monster. Among her many virtues, including strength and compassion, is her incredible hair, which often is in her face and needs a good flip. Throughout Madoka Magica, Homura regularly enters scenes with a sick one-liner, punctuated by an elegant hair flip. And often when she leaves a scene, it's with a grave warning or even just silence. Then, she turns and runs her fingers through those long, black tresses.

— Cecilia D'Anastasio, Kotaku

Homura's character has received largely positive reception. Her backstory revealed in episode 10 was highly lauded because of how it portrays her pain and struggle as well as explains her cold personality; multiple critics have also said it is the series' best episode. Critics also commended the character's complexity and tragedy, and have seen her as a sympathetic character. Critics have described her backstory as "outstanding", "compelling", and "haunting". Zac Bertschy of Anime News Network described Homura as the series' "most crucial" character, while Dan Barnett of UK Anime Network regarded her as the tragic heroine of the story. Ryotaro Aoki of Otaku USA also characterized her as "a stoic, justice-seeking righteous" character. THEM Anime Reviews reviewer Jacob Churosh said Homura's "mask of cool aloofness and brutal indifference crumbles in spectacular fashion [..] as we probe the depths of her history and begin to discover what tragedies caused Homura to don such a mask in the first place". Richard Eisenbeis of Kotaku said that after rewatching the series, "all the plot twists and character motivations [...] almost becomes a new story—not about Madoka but about Homura". He added "the story can be looked at as Homura being the only sane person in an insane world" and noted that "many of her lines have double meanings that can only be appreciated" with a second viewing. Hideaki Anno liked her backstory and the way she was depicted. Japanese critic Minori Ishida called Homura one of the "most complex" and "underrated" female characters in anime. Her self-sacrifice for Madoka and their tragic relationship has also been commended. Some critics have also commended Homura's "dark beauty" and "luxurious hair".

Homura's character in the Rebellion movie earned positive critical response. Writers enjoyed the focus of her character as well as her development. Chris Beveridge of The Fandom Post enjoyed watching Homura as the main character of the film and said that she "has always been the key character" for him, and "she owns this movie well". Writer Jen A. Blue stated Homura had "extensive character development" and called her a "very complex character". Critics noted that Homura's rebellion against Madoka was consistent. They sympathized with her actions as Homura never had her wish granted and was the only person to remember Madoka as well as having memories of failing to save her. Richard Eisenbeis said "it must have been hell for her" to experience all of this, and Toshi Nakamura also pointed out the character's "psychological state" and the "Incubators using Homura as a lab rat" leading her to become a witch. Jacob Chapmam of Anime News Network mentioned her new look at the end of the film, calling her "out-of-character". He also felt that, "Devil Homura's victory feels tragic and hollow". Lynzee Loveridge of the same website stated that she enjoyed having the film focus on Homura's character in the Rebellion ending. Reviewers commended Homura's battle with Mami; Geoff Berkshire of Variety described the battle as "an epic, gravity-defying gun" that "would make the Wachowskis jealous"; Richard Eisenbeis described it as a "pretty epic" battle.

Critics have also enjoyed Chiwa Saitō's performance. Hailing the series' cast as "uniformly impressive", Jacob Churosh highlighted Saitō's as a standout, while David Cabrera of Anime News Network wrote, "[The cast's] performances, particularly Chiwa Saitō as Homura, are frequently heart-wrenching." Her portrayal of Homura won Saitō the 1st Newtype Anime Awards for Best Supporting Actress in 2011. Cristina Vee was also praised, with Kory Cerjak of The Fandom Post saying that Vee "works really well" as Homura, and that she "truly shines", while also commenting on the "slight changes in her intonation that designates her change in demeanor," that he calls "brilliant". Zac Bertschy states that Vee "turns in a better performance" as the character "which is a good thing since so much of the series rests on her shoulders". Cristina Vee was also nominated for Best Female Lead Vocal Performance in Television at the 1st BTVA Voice Acting Awards.

Lynzee Loveridge ranked Homura first in her article "8 Essential Time-Travelling Heroines", writing: "Homura relives tragedy after tragedy in hopes of saving her best friend, and ultimately the world, from destruction. If Homura can be faulted for inadvertently creating the situation she hopes to prevent, she can also be credited for destroying the system of despair magical girls were trapped in." She also included Homura second in a special article list, comparing the character's selfishness and her rebellion against Madoka to that of Paradise Lost's Lucifer. In June 2018, Crunchyroll ranked Homura third in "Most Unlucky Characters in All of Anime", with writer Nicole Mejias writing that Homura has "re-lived the same tragic events nearly 100 times" that "is perhaps one of the worst fates someone could have", noting she lived "alone and trapped in a cycle that never ends".

=== Analysis ===
Homura has been analyzed by several writers who have explored and commented on the character's psyche and mental state. Jen A. Blue wrote that Homura is the representation of functional depression or dysthymia, and that "while she is functional, she is also depressed, and all it takes is a slight push downward to make her collapse". She also says she suffers from guilt, self-hatred in addition to being suicidal. Writer Bryan J. McAfee also shared a similar opinion and believed Homura suffers from post-traumatic stress disorder (PTSD) because of her failed attempts to save Madoka as well as killing her to prevent her from becoming a witch and for experiencing cruel realities in her time loops. Homura's rebellion against Madoka has also been the subject of analysis. Blue said, "Homura's choice to become a 'demon' devoted to keeping Madoka in the world costs her the only thing she values, the chance to be together with Madoka in the end; now they must eventually be enemies. Isn't it therefore Homura who is selfless?". The writer also says that the film's title, Rebellion, is referring to Homura rebelling against her fate and Kyubey. Blue also noted that, "Homura is nowhere near as evil as she considers herself to be."

Homura has also been compared to Goethe's character Faust, and Nutcracker from The Nutcracker and the Mouse King by E. T. A. Hoffmann's. Noting Homura's complexity and multifaceted personality, Blue highlights how Homura becomes the demiurge of the new universe and yet she "chooses to make a world where she is alone" and isolates herself from everyone, only to give Madoka a normal, happy life with her family. She adds Homura "remains a morally ambiguous figure" by the end of the film. Blue also observed how "If the other magical girls had simply killed her [Homulilly], she would be beyond further punishment, and her suffering would have ended. But they, in their cruel mercy, forced her to go on, forced her to find another way to keep protecting Madoka and punishing herself. She hates them for that, for failing to hate her as she hates herself."

Homura's time loop is said to be a response to trauma. However, Blue says that Homura actually suffered from trauma before even becoming a magical girl, having been hospitalized for heart disease for half a year.

She has spent six months helpless, afraid for her life, probably in a great deal of pain, being subjected to who knows how many invasive, frightening tests and procedures. That's a lot for anyone to handle, let alone a 14-year-old girl, so it is unsurprising that Homura already shows a number of trauma symptoms from the start: she is anxious and shy, socially withdrawn, and struggles with self-worth issues, which morph quickly into suicidal ideation when she wanders into a Witch's labyrinth. She clings hard to Madoka as her savior and friend thereafter, only to see Madoka die in battle with Walpurgisnacht.

When Madoka makes her wish, Blue notes that she saves all the magical girls except Homura. "[S]ince her trauma predates becoming a magical girl, Madoka cannot simply absorb it from her Soul Gem as she does with the others; instead, Homura carries her memories of both her failure to rescue Madoka and, buried beneath, her helplessness in the hospital." Additionally, when Homura turns into a demon and rewrites the world, she "serves only to deepen her suffering: where once, in the grip of a Witch, she contemplated suicide, in the stinger of Rebellion she actually attempts it, throwing herself off a cliff". The writer observed that Homura's world is superior to Madoka's pure land since the characters are much happier in her world. Reiji Yamada asserts Homura suffers from loneliness, saying that her time magic is the equivalent of lonely magic. Writing for A Cycle, Not a Phase: Love Between Magical Girls Amidst the Trauma of Puella Magi Madoka Magica, Kevin Cooley argues that Homura's powers are not merely a "metaphor for love between magical girls," but "literally are the love between magical girls" and that Madoka's actions create a world "where love between women can prosper free from Kyubey's policing."

== Merchandising ==
Because of Homura's popularity, merchandise related to the character such as Nendoroids and figurines have been created. In 2012, a talking alarm clock with Homura's voice, recorded by Chiwa Saitō, was auctioned with a winning bid of 112,000 yen on the Yahoo! Japan site. A replica set of Homura's Rebellion ear cuffs that sold for 21,600 yen was also released in 2015 and was sold out immediately. Other merchandise based on Homura has been released that includes plush dolls, perfumes, mugs, posters, headphones, keychains, clothing items such as T-shirts, high heels and shoes, lingerie and glasses. Homura was featured on a MasterCard credit card, and has also appeared on a body wrap for Mercedes-Benz cars for test driving, as well as appearing on vending machines in the form of a doll. Homura appeared on a Japanese guide dog-training organization poster. Japanese toy company Bandai produced a replica of Homura's grief seed. The Homura Magica book that explores Homura's character depth, including her personality, relationships, and features an interview with Saitō, was released in December 2018.
