= Sayaka Miki =

Puella Magi Madoka Magica character

- Puella Magi Madoka Magica character
- Sayaka Miki in Magia Record wielding her cutlass, illustrated by Sasagi Koushi
- First appearance: "As If I Met Her in My Dream..."
- Created by: Akiyuki Shinbo; Gen Urobuchi; Ume Aoki
- Designed by: Ume Aoki; Takahiro Kishida
- Portrayed by: Miku Kanemura (Magia Record stage play)
- Voiced by: Japanese: Eri Kitamura; English: Sarah Anne Williams

In-universe information
- Species: Human (initially); Magical girl (currently); Witch (formerly; previous timeline)
- Gender: Female
- Weapon: Cutlass

Sayaka Miki (Japanese: 美樹 さやか, Hepburn: Miki Sayaka) is a fictional character and the supporting protagonist from the 2011 anime series Puella Magi Madoka Magica. A girl with a strong sense of justice and a classical music fan, Sayaka is the childhood and best friend of one of the series' protagonists, Madoka Kaname. She highly respects and admires her upperclassman Mami Tomoe, an experienced magical girl that fights for justice, and aspires to be like her. Sayaka makes a contract with the messenger of magic, Kyubey, and becomes a magical girl to heal the arms of Kyōsuke Kamijo, a boy she has been infatuated with since childhood. Sayaka has appeared in several Puella Magi Madoka Magica media, including manga, a novel adaptation of the series, and video games.

Writer Gen Urobuchi stated that he had created Sayaka based on an "Urobuchi character". He referred to her as his favorite character in the series and said her story was the most enjoyable to write. She was designed by Ume Aoki; due to the character's tomboyish personality, Aoki wanted to express both boyish and girlish qualities to the character's design. Sayaka is voiced by Eri Kitamura in Japanese and Sarah Anne Williams in the English version of the series.

Sayaka Miki is generally positively received by critics, who praised her tragic arc as well as her similarities and relationship with Kyoko Sakura. Her descent into despair was also praised, with critics expressing how effectively portrayed the struggle with her ideals was. Sayaka's character and the nature of her witch have also attracted critical attention. Sayaka has also been popular amongst fans, as she places high in multiple popularity polls. Many different pieces of merchandise related to her, such as figures, plush dolls, and keychains have been released.

== Conception ==
=== Creation and design ===
Sayaka Miki's name was given by series writer Gen Urobuchi. Urobuchi created Sayaka and based her personality on an "Urobuchi character", unlike the series protagonist, Madoka Kaname, who is an unusual character for his writing style and follows the style of character designer Ume Aoki's characters. Urobuchi stated that Sayaka was his favorite character overall and that her storyline was the most enjoyable to write. Because of her grim fate by the end of the series, series director Akiyuki Shinbo asked Urobuchi if it was possible to change the plot so Sayaka could be spared. Urobuchi declined, saying it was integral for her to die "in order for the audience to really understand why Madoka became the ultimate magical girl at the end". Shinbo then asked if she could be brought back to life, saying he had become very attached to the character. Urobuchi again refused, saying this would be impossible because of the already-established rules governing the story. Shinbo acquiesced but said he believed there may have been too large a burden placed on the characters who were young, middle-school girls.

In episode eight of the series, the conversation Sayaka overhears on a train about women was actually based on a real event that Urobuchi witnessed, who said that he heard a similar conversation between two men on a crowded train. Urobuchi said that even if Sayaka confessed her love to Kyōsuke Kamijo, she would never have been happy with him. Nevertheless, he defended Sayaka's wish and choices in the finale, as she still decided to wish for him before disappearing with Madoka to the afterlife. Urobuchi said that the final episode is not about Sayaka is destined to die but about her giving her own life to help Kyōsuke play the music again so she could listen to him, and felt that the viewers misunderstood her wish. Another aspect Urobuchi wanted to develop in the series was the initial clash between Sayaka and her rival magical girl, Kyoko Sakura; where he stated that across the story, Kyoko kills herself with Sayaka because both of their mistakes are "completely the same".

Sayaka was designed by Ume Aoki. Her color motif is blue. In her magical girl outfit, Sayaka is designed to look like a knight that appears in a magical fantasy setting, and wears a cape and asymmetrical skirt. Urobuchi found her cape to be stylish. Because of the character's tomboyish personality, Aoki said that she wanted to express both boyish and girlish qualities to the character's design; as a result, she said that the design plan of the magical girl figure was not determined until the last few drafts. In order to express these traits, Aoki designed the length of her hair and skirt asymmetrically to contrast her femininity and masculinity on both sides of her body. Aoki originally added a simple yellow hairpin to the character, but it was left out in the series due to various animation issues. It was added in the compilation movies by Aoki's suggestion, and she changed the hairpin's shape into a fortissimo symbol. Aoki stated that the music motif design was inspired by the animation team from the TV series as they add music notes to Sayaka's transformation sequences and abilities.

For the 2013 sequel film Puella Magi Madoka Magica the Movie: Rebellion, Urobuchi said that he developed Sayaka's role as someone that knows "more [things] than Homura does for once". In an interview with manga artist Kazuo Koike, Koike asks if Sayaka might become the new protagonist in the future. Urobuchi replied that since Sayaka had a special role in Rebellion, there is a possibility of her being a "lone heroine in the future", and he believes that Sayaka might be the only person who can stop Homura Akemi. Junichiro Taniguchi, the film's character designer and animation supervisor, said that Sayaka's design changed the most, though he initially did not intend to change it. According to Taniguchi, Sayaka and Kyoko's roles are reversed in the film, as Sayaka appears to be the "mysterious one" while Kyoko "seems more upbeat".

=== Voice actresses ===
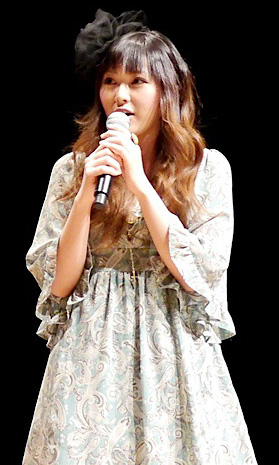
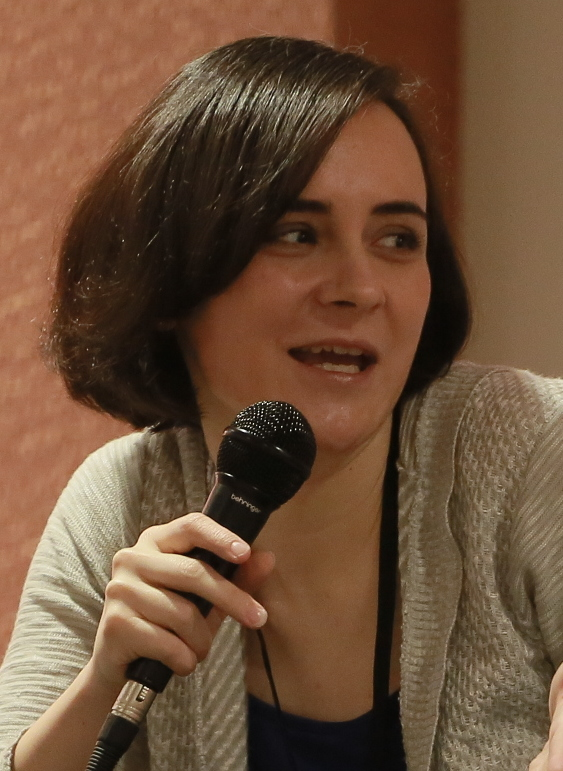
Eri Kitamura (left) and Sarah Anne Williams (right) voiced Sayaka in the anime's Japanese and English versions, respectively.

Sayaka is voiced by Eri Kitamura in the Japanese version. When Kitamura received the role, she was happy as she liked the character since the audition. Kitamura described Sayaka's character as more "honest than everybody else" but "also weaker than everybody else". She felt that Sayaka was like any young girl who faces difficult circumstances and does not think properly about what is right and wrong, and said that Sayaka "just faced it up with dignity, even though she got more downcast than any others". Kitamura said that she fell in love with Sayaka's character and that she is the "most realistic" character she has voiced, describing her as a magical girl with a "strong sense of justice". Kitamura acknowledged that while it was difficult to portray the character's emotional changes, it was "rewarding" and she "kind of enjoyed it". Shinbo stated that Kitamura's acting as a suffering girl was "really great". Shinbo also said that Kitamura was not convinced with Sayaka's death. For Puella Magi Madoka Magica the Movie: Rebellion, Kitamura said the scene between Sayaka and Homura opposing each other was the most memorable scene for her, stating that their dialogue "[has] a lot of subtle nuances", and expressed the difficulty in playing "a worthy character" despite being engrossed by the acting. In the English dub, Sayaka is voiced by Sarah Anne Williams. As a fan of the magical girl genre, Williams was surprised when she first watched Madoka Magica, recalling that the series is "not going to be a normal ride" and "it's probably going to hurt".

Williams characterized Sayaka's personality as "tomboyish, very cheerful and upbeat", and "a bit naive". She stated that she loved Sayaka's character because she feels "a little similar to her", and says "it's very much like kinda taking a part of [herself] and pulling in a different direction."

== Character ==
Sayaka Miki is Madoka Kaname's best friend since childhood and a second-year student at Mitakihara Middle School. She is a blue-haired lively tomboy with strong ideals of love and lawfulness, as well as a huge fan of classical music. After she helps Madoka rescue the messenger of magic, Kyubey, she is introduced to the world of magical girls by Mami Tomoe, an experienced magical girl who fights for justice and protects people from surreal monsters called witches, and Sayaka aspires to be like her. Mami offers to take both Sayaka and Madoka along on her witch hunts so they may learn of the responsibilities that come with being a magical girl. However, Mami gets brutally killed by a witch named Charlotte. After Mami's death, Sayaka makes a contract with Kyubey and becomes a magical girl by using her wish to heal the wounded hand of Kyōsuke Kamijo, a young violinist that she is infatuated with and visits daily in the hospital. She tries to assume Mami's role and believes that every magical girl should use their power to help people, and dislikes Homura Akemi and Kyoko Sakura due to their different views. She fights against Kyoko at one time due to the latter's ideals.

As a magical girl, Sayaka wears a blue skirt with a white cape and gloves. Her weapon of choice is a cutlass that she is able to produce multiple copies of at a time. She also has a strong regenerative ability due to the healing nature of her wish. Sayaka insists that her wish is selfless and feels that fighting witches to save people is a bonus, even after witnessing Mami's death.

== Appearances ==
=== Puella Magi Madoka Magica ===
When Mami Tomoe saves her and Madoka from a witch, Kyubey explains that he wants to form a contract with Sayaka and Madoka and make them magical girls in exchange for granting them any wish. Mami then offers to take them with her on a witch hunt to determine whether there is a wish they would risk their lives for. After witnessing Mami's death, Sayaka becomes worried about becoming a magical girl, but later makes a contract with Kyubey in order to heal Kyōsuke's hands, a boy she has been infatuated with since childhood. She clashes with Kyoko Sakura over their ideals and they try to kill each other before being stopped by Homura Akemi. Sayaka resents Kyoko due her selfish outlook, and Homura for misunderstanding that she let Mami get killed by a witch. As Sayaka's ideals are confronted by the reality of her wish's consequences and the stress of fighting, her view of the world is slowly corrupted. She becomes hateful and distrustful towards others, including Madoka, whom she lashes out at and accuses of being selfish.

After learning that her soul is no longer in her body, but in her Soul Gem, Sayaka starts to believe she is a zombie; and when her friend Hitomi Shizuki confesses to her about her love of Kyōsuke, Sayaka falls into despair and refuses all help. She loses faith in her ideals and herself, which leads to her Soul Gem to corrupt and become a Grief Seed. She becomes the armored Mermaid Witch Oktavia von Seckendorff. Although Kyoko and Madoka attempt to communicate with Sayaka, they realize that she is beyond help. Kyoko then performs a powerful attack to finish off Oktavia at the cost of her life. It is later revealed that Homura is a time traveler, and in all of the timelines, Sayaka would always despair and turn into a witch when making a contract. Despite Madoka becoming an ultimate magical girl and reworking the world in the final timeline, Sayaka still makes a wish in the new world, and ends up disappearing after exhausting her soul gem. Sayaka does not regret her wish and hopes that Hitomi will make Kyōsuke happy.

In the 2013 sequel Puella Magi Madoka Magica the Movie: Rebellion, Sayaka assists Madoka and Nagisa Momoe in saving Homura, and has received knowledge of all previous timelines as a result of becoming a part of the Law of Cycles. She shows the power to summon and manipulate witches, with her Oktavia form now an extension of her will she can summon. Sayaka states that she became an assistant to Madoka because she "regretted leaving Kyoko behind". At the end of the film, Sayaka and Nagisa were pulled from the afterlife by Homura, and given a new life and human forms in the new world. Unlike Madoka and Nagisa, Sayaka retained her memories before being subjected to Homura's power as Sayaka promises to never forget the devil that Homura had become even if she forgets everything else.

=== Magia Record ===
In January 2018, Aniplex made a debut character commercial for Sayaka for the smartphone game Magia Record due to her late introduction. Sayaka appears in Chapter 6 of the main story and joins Madoka and Homura to search for Mami in Kamihama city. They infiltrate the abandoned Kamihama Record Museum and are attacked by the Wings of Magius, a group of magical girls that wants to liberate magical girls from their cruel fate. While Madoka and Homura fight, Sayaka meets Mami, who is now brainwashed and has become a member of the Wings of Magius. Mami tries to kill Iroha Tamaki and Yachiyo Nanami but is stopped by Sayaka. After being overpowered by Mami, Sayaka escapes the fight with Iroha and Yachiyo by using one of Homura's bombs.

After introducing herself to Iroha and Yachiyo, Sayaka learns that magical girls become witches when their soul gem is corrupted. Sayaka meets with Madoka and Homura, divulging everything she learned. Sayaka fears becoming a witch, but Madoka convinces her that they should not abandon hope, and that they should keep searching for Mami; Sayaka agrees. After they return to Mitakihara city, Mami appears before them and they try to convince her to stop. They fail and are trapped in a barrier created by Alina Gray before being rescued by Kyoko, who tells them that a very powerful witch called Walpurgisnacht is coming to Kamihama city before leaving. Sayaka, Madoka, and Homura go to Kamihama city, where they meet Mami (who had been released from her mind control) and their friends to stop the Magius and defeat Walpurgisnacht.

For the stage play adaptation of Magia Record, Sayaka is portrayed by Miku Kanemura. In the anime adaptation, Sayaka appears in the final episode of the first season. She protects Yachiyo Nanami and engages in a fight with a brainwashed Mami.

=== Appearances in other media ===
Sayaka has appeared in several manga series in the Puella Magi Madoka Magica franchise. She is a supporting character in Puella Magi Oriko Magica, where she is one of Homura's friends. In this timeline, Homura protects Sayaka from Kyubey, and prevents her from learning about magic or becoming a magical girl. In Puella Magi Madoka Magica: The Different Story, Sayaka has a similar personality to the original series, but displays more perfectionist tendencies. She fights alongside Mami, who gets injured while protecting her; as a result, Sayaka ends her partnership with Mami out of guilt and decides to fight alone. She is a recurring character in Puella Magi Madoka Magica: Wraith Arc, which takes place between the films Eternal and Rebellion. Sayaka also appears in a novel adaptation of the original series written by Hajime Ninomae, illustrated by Yūpon and published by Nitroplus, with script composition by Gen Urobuchi. The novel details how Sayaka met with Madoka and formed a friendship with her, becoming her childhood friend. She appears in the manga adaptation of the anime series, written and illustrated by Honakogae, and published by Houbunsha.

Sayaka is a playable character in most Puella Magi Madoka Magica video games, such as the PlayStation Portable action video game developed by Namco Bandai Games, Puella Magi Madoka Magica Portable (2012), and the PlayStation Vita game titled Puella Magi Madoka Magica: The Battle Pentagram (2013). She is also present alongside Kyoko in the third-person shooter (TPS) titled Puella Magi Madoka Magica TPS Featuring Sayaka Miki & Sakura Kyoko (2012). Sayaka appeared in the pachinko games Slot Puella Magi Madoka Magica (2013) and Slot Puella Magi Madoka Magica 2 (2016), the latter of which featured the song "Naturally" by her voice actress Eri Kitamura and Madoka's Aoi Yuki. She is also featured in CR Pachinko Puella Magi Madoka Magica (2017), SLOT Puella Magi Madoka Magica A (2017), and Slot Puella Magi Madoka Magica the Movie: Rebellion (2019).

The character appears in several crossover games such as the role-playing video games Crash Fever and Kaden Shoujo. Sayaka also appears in the mobile games Phantom of the Kill, Valkyrie Connect, Unison League, Million Arthur, Puyo Puyo Quest, and the tower defense RPG Chain Chronicle. A drama CD that explores Sayaka's character was also released.

== Cultural impact ==
=== Critical response ===
[Sayaka's] tragedy is front-and-center [..] and it's a powerful and fascinating piece of writing. [..] in exchange for her wish and her status as a magical girl, Sayaka has lost her humanity. [..]Sayaka is No Longer Human – the one thing she sacrificed everything for, love, is totally out of her grasp now. [..]the character is punished for her decision. She is literally wasting away, harboring a tainted soul, neither living nor dead but on the verge of total collapse. Sayaka's despair is so effectively portrayed it's almost tough to watch. Seeing her break down emotionally as a result of having her soul torn from its host really brings home the impact of the situation – it wouldn't be anywhere near as powerful a story without having all those pieces fall into place exactly as they do, and it's a real testament to the quality of this show's writing.

— Zac Bertschy, Anime News Network

Critical response to Sayaka's character has generally been positive. Kory Cerjak from The Fandom Post praised Sayaka's tragic arc and downfall. He also found her similarities with Kyoko interesting, describes them both as "tragedies", and praised Sarah Anne Williams as her voice actress. Michael Pementel of Bloody Disgusting also commended the character's struggle as she "begins to realize everything she's lost out on" and "questions her actions and accepts that all she has done was a mistake", while also praising her "descent into depression". Josh A. Stevens of Anime UK News said: "When I think of Madoka Magica though, I think of Sayaka. The bubbly tomboy in love who was forced to question whether there is really such a thing as a selfless act, and discovers that kindness can lead to greater tragedy. The majority of the cast's character arcs are complex and deserving of their own series, but hers is the one that's stuck with me." Rebecca Silverman of Anime News Network noted how Sayaka and Kyoko "serve as mirror characters to each other", as they had similar wishes with similar results, but found that Sayaka "arguably brings her own problems down on her head with her attitude". She also said that Sayaka's tragic arc was "disturbing for its apparent inevitability". THEM Anime Reviews reviewer Jacob Churosh commended her Japanese voice actress, stating that Eri Kitamura "provide[s] worthy support as the dangerously brash Sayaka Miki."

Dan Barnett of UK Anime Network enjoyed Sayaka's interaction with Kyoko in Puella Magi Madoka Magica the Movie: Rebellion due to their relatively more carefree relationship, calling it "one of the truly joyous moments in the film". In his review of the Magia Record anime adaptation, James Beckett of Anime News Network described Sayaka's appearance as fanservice, moreover he called her one of his favorite Madoka Magica characters. He further noted that she "has no stake in Iroha or Yachiyo's fates, and she shouldn't be relevant to them, either".

=== Analysis ===
Sayaka's character has also attracted critical attention. Japanese psychologist Takashi Tomita observed that Sayaka has the determination and clumsiness to stick to one thing when she thinks about getting it, and when she gets stuck, she easily becomes stressed. Tomita also noted that Sayaka tends to indulge self-hatred due to her strong desire for perfection. Writer Mayuko Ueda said that Sayaka's self-esteem is one of her weaknesses. Sara Cleto and Erin Kathleen Bahl note the elements that Oktavia (Sayaka's witch form) uses "to construct her labyrinth are drawn from her memories as well as from fairy-tale tropes, and she remixes these pieces to create multiple versions of her own memory-narrative". They compared her unrequited love story to that of The Little Mermaid by Hans Christian Andersen. Writing for The Girl at the End of Time: Temporality, (P)remediation, and Narrative Freedom in Puella Magi Madoka Magica, Forrest Greenwood notes all of the series' character designs have themes that convey their character; he says that Sayaka's design conveys her as a "forthright" character.

In the book The Very Soil: An Unauthorized Critical Study of Puella Magi Madoka Magica, Jen A. Blue posits that the main characters of the series suffers from different types of depressive disorders, with Sayaka's entire arc about "a story of loss and mounting despair culminating in suicide". Blue also comments on Sayaka's admiration for Mami Tomoe and hatred for Homura Akemi, as Sayaka immediately cheers and admires Mami because she serves as a protector of innocents but hates and misunderstands Homura due her different role. She describes how Sayaka sees the conflict between magical girls and witches as a fight between good and evil, and eagerly decides to join the former. Blue states that Sayaka only "wants to fight evil", and that she is only focused on her actions in an attempt to achieve her desired "state of being", but fails to express her true wish. Blue also says that the thing that most hurts Sayaka is the moment where she regrets saving her friend Hitomi from a witch, and uses it to rationalize her "becom[ing] subhuman". She also compares her unrequited love story to The Little Mermaid.

=== Popularity ===
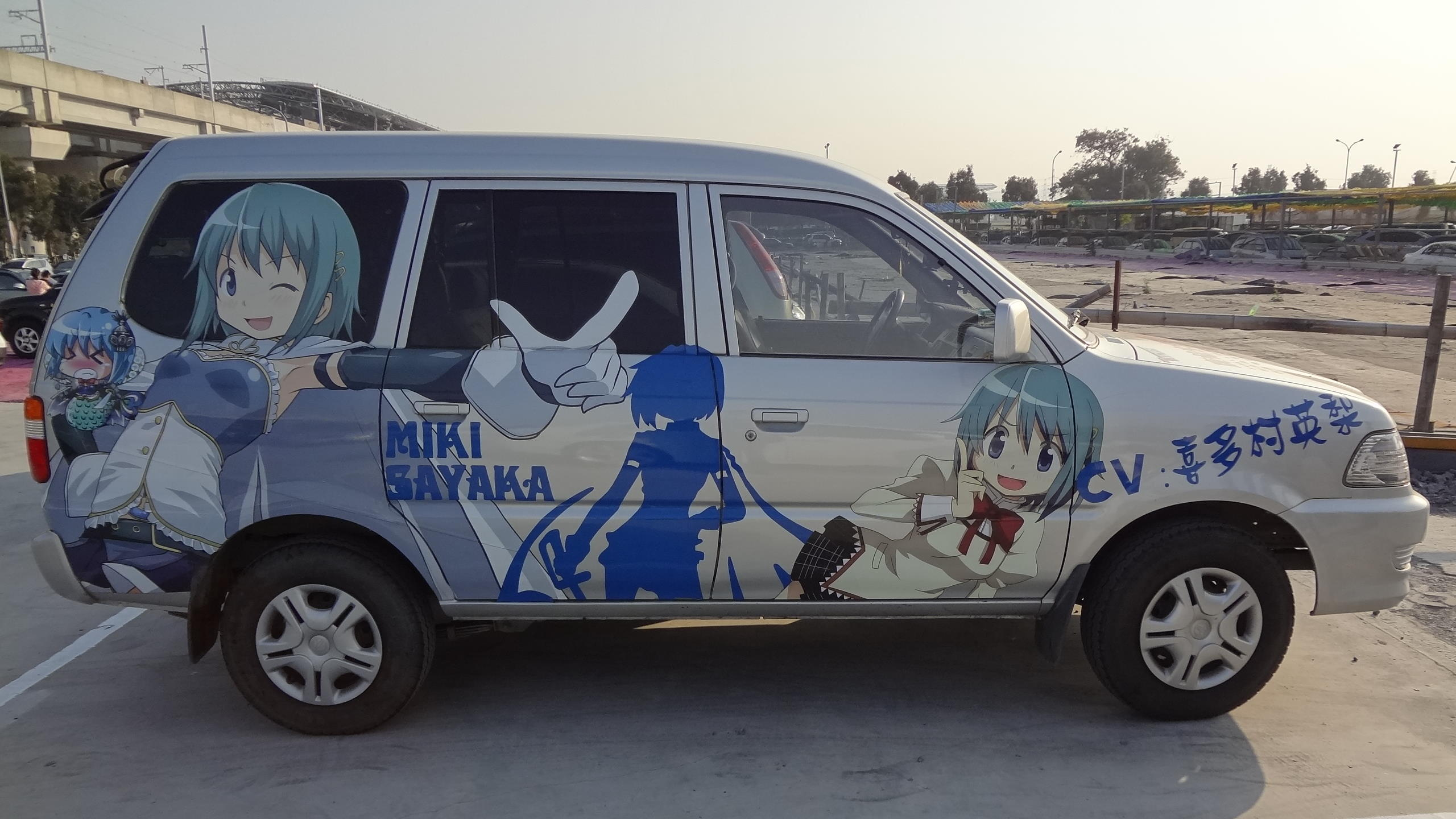
An itasha-Toyota car featuring Sayaka in Taichung, Taiwan

Sayaka has been well received by fans, as evidenced by her high ranking in several popularity polls. She took second place for "Top 7 Blue-Haired Anime Heroines" voted by fans asked in Akihabara. In 2012, she was voted as the second most tragic female character in anime, and took eighth place in 2015 for the same category. In a BIGLOBE poll, Sayaka ranked 18th in the category "Anime Girl that Attracts the Most Desperate Fanboys", and took eighth place for best yandere girls. In a 2015 Charapedia poll, Sayaka ranked 17th of "Characters who deserve their own anime" list. Sayaka was also voted as the eight most popular SHAFT heroines in 2016. The same year, a Charapedia poll, which asked fans to list the "best anime magical girls", had Sayaka placed 9th with 226 votes. In an Anime News Network poll, Sayaka's witch form was voted as the second coolest monster form in anime. In another ANN poll of "Who is your favorite blue-haired character", Sayaka placed fifth with 8.5% of the votes. In a Manga.Tokyo poll from 2018, Sayaka's line "I… am so stupid" was voted as the eighth most famous premortem line in anime. In a 2020 Ani Trending News poll, Sayaka was also voted as the eighth best female anime character of Winter 2011. The same year, Sayaka was voted the 14th best magical girl character in a poll by Anime! Anime!.

Charles Pulliam-Moore from Gizmodo Australia included Sayaka in the list of "9 Magical Girl Transformation Sequences To Inspire You To Get Dressed", with Pulliam-Moore appreciating Sayaka's transformation scene for highlighting aspects of her character as well as commenting on her "bullish nature" which "is a big part of what makes her such a powerful witch".

=== Merchandise ===
Several merchandise items based on Sayaka have been released, including keychains, plush dolls, figurines, and nendoroids. Along with the main cast of the series, Sayaka appeared on the sides of taxis in Sapporo and was sold in vending machines as a doll. Japanese toy company Bandai produced a replica of Sayaka's Grief Seed. To promote Puella Magi Madoka Magica the Movie: Rebellion, a rubber strap, bandana (drawn by Ume Aoki), and pouch based on the character were created. In 2016, SuperGroupies created lingerie inspired by Sayaka and Kyoko. In 2017, Good Smile Company released a 1/8th-scale figure of Sayaka wielding her swords that stands roughly 190mm tall. Tokyo Otaku Mode also produced a kimono summer-themed Sayaka figure in 2017.
