= Madoka Kaname =

Puella Magi Madoka Magica character

- Puella Magi Madoka Magica character
- Madoka Kaname holding her bow, artwork by Ume Aoki
- First appearance: "As If I Met Her in My Dream..." (2011)
- Created by: Akiyuki Shinbo; Gen Urobuchi; Ume Aoki
- Designed by: Ume Aoki; Takahiro Kishida
- Portrayed by: Akari Nibu (Magia Record stage play)
- Voiced by: Japanese: Aoi Yūki; English: Christine Marie Cabanos

In-universe information
- Alias: Law of Cycles; Ultimate Madoka (Magia Record)
- Species: Human (initially); Magical girl (formerly); God (currently)
- Gender: Female
- Relatives: Junko Kaname (mother); Tomohisa Kaname (father); Tatsuya Kaname (brother)
- Weapon: Bow

Madoka Kaname (Japanese: 鹿目 まどか, Hepburn: Kaname Madoka) is the main protagonist of the 2011 Japanese anime television series Puella Magi Madoka Magica. Madoka is a kind and gentle girl who initially lives a normal and happy life, but is suddenly faced with the decision of becoming a magical girl. She aspires to become a magical girl after witnessing her senior Mami Tomoe fighting against surreal monsters known as witches in order to protect people. In Puella Magi Madoka Magica the Movie: Rebellion, Madoka appears as a magical girl and joins her friends in fighting new monsters known as nightmares. She appears in most Puella Magi Madoka Magica related-media, including manga, novels and video games. Madoka Kaname is voiced by Aoi Yūki in Japanese, and Christine Marie Cabanos in English.

In developing the character, writer Gen Urobuchi imagined the series' protagonist would be a girl with a "cheerful and idealistic" personality, in contrast to his usual writing style. Madoka was designed by Ume Aoki, who used the character Yuno from her manga Hidamari Sketch as a base. Although her theme color was intended to be white, it later was changed to pink. Aoki also noted the difficulty of drawing Madoka due to her double ponytail hair.

Madoka has ranked highly in various polls, placing second in the Best Female Category at the 1st Newtype Anime Awards in 2011, as well ranking seventh in a top 10 anime heroines poll conducted by NHK in 2013. Her character has been well received by fans and critics, with reviewers praising her character transformation and resonance with the series' other characters, particularly her relationship with Homura Akemi.

== Creation and development ==
In the initial planning meeting of the Puella Magi Madoka Magica franchise, which began as a 2011 anime television series, writer Gen Urobuchi imagined that the heroine of the series would be a girl with a "cheerful and idealistic" personality. Madoka is an unusual character for Urobuchi's writing style, and fits more closely to character designer Ume Aoki's worldview. In order to incorporate a "foreign character that did not exist inside [himself]," Urobuchi wrote the initial script as if Yuno, the main character of Aoki's manga series Hidamari Sketch, was the protagonist. During this phase, Urobuchi even intended Kana Asumi to take on the voice acting role for Madoka. The personality of Madoka was specifically designed as an "Ume Aoki character", while other characters of the cast, such as Homura Akemi and Sayaka Miki, are more typical for Urobuchi's style. Urobuchi said that in the beginning, there was an idea to write the story as "Homura strives to save Madoka", therefore, he created the characteristics of Madoka and Homura as a contrast to each other. Madoka's birthday, October 3, was chosen as it was the file creation date of the series' initial project proposal.

=== Design ===
Ultimate Madoka's design illustrated by Ume Aoki

Madoka was designed by Ume Aoki, who initially used the protagonist of her manga Hidamari Sketch, Yuno, as a prototype to design Madoka; she created Madoka's design after exaggerating part of its image. Although Madoka's theme color was initially intended to be white as suggested by Urobuchi in the series' draft, Aoki forgot this when designing the character, and changed the main color of Madoka to pink. Aoki said that in terms of character design, drawing Madoka was more difficult than Sayaka Miki and Kyoko Sakura, particularly because of the double ponytail design of Madoka's hair, stating that once the size and painting of the ponytail are different, "it looks like a completely different role". Another difference with other magical girls is that in the story, when Madoka transforms into her magical girl outfit, is the result of the appearance of the magical girl in her dream. For this reason, the dress design especially added ruffles and several decorative elements. Overall, Aoki incorporated fairy tale elements and designed a very "cute" magical girl costume. However, Aoki also stated that Madoka's dress is not suitable for fighting.

After seeing the character design, the president of the series' animation studio SHAFT, Mitsutoshi Kubota, thought that it was a good that the production team got in touch with a new style, but it also brought challenges to the animation production. Recalling this, Aoki did not expect that her style would be adapted directly, although it could bring the feeling of the character Madoka. In addition, the animation production team also tried to avoid some exaggerated expressions, such as broken clothes, huge sweat beads or emoticons.

Her Ultimate Magical girl form, was also designed by Aoki. She designed her costume based on white theme color and cherry blossoms, and designed her hair to be longer and her eyes to change from pink to gold, suggesting Madoka's new form of magical girl. Ultimate Madoka's form has been described as "the ultimate form that has undergone a super evolution by fighting infinite space-time"; according to the Puella Magi Madoka Magica The Beginning Story guidebook, the form was originally called "Hyper Ultimate Madoka" in the series draft, but was later changed to "Ultimate Madoka".

=== Voice actresses ===
Madoka is portrayed in Japanese by Aoi Yūki. In an interview with Animate, Yūki reminisced about the series' early production and how she aimed to do her best in playing the role. She also felt from the start that the series would be one that would be enjoyed by many people.

In the English dub of Madoka Magica, she is portrayed by Christine Marie Cabanos. During the recording process, Cabanos had trouble not overthinking her role, but she learned to "let go" as the dubbing process continued.

== Appearances ==
=== In Puella Magi Madoka Magica ===
Madoka is a kind and gentle girl who comes from a loving family. A second-year at middle school, her life changes when she encounters the messenger of magic, Kyubey, who offers to transform her into a magical girl. She sees herself as a person without special qualities or talents, and after seeing her schoolmate Mami Tomoe fighting against witches, aspires to become a magical girl like her. Averse to fighting, she hopes that the magical girls will support each other, sometimes even putting her own life at risk to help them, and is distressed by the infighting they often engage in. After witnessing Mami's death, she grows uncertain about becoming a magical girl, growing ever more hesitant as the true cost of the role is revealed to her. Kyubey claims that Madoka has an impossibly large amount of potential for magic, going so far as to claim that she could become the savior of all the magical girls. The reason for this is unclear, since her life so far has been relatively average and free of tragedies. This is later revealed to be due to her accumulated misfortune, which was caused as a result of her classmate Homura Akemi repeatedly resetting time, with Madoka's fate getting worse with each timeline, making her magic power grow exponentially with each reset.

In previous timelines, Madoka became a magical girl in a pink dress wielding a rose branch bow and arrow. In the drama CD, "Memories of You", it is revealed that the wish in the first timeline was to save a cat named Amy from death. However, every time, she was either killed or transformed into a witch named Kriemhild Gretchen, the Witch of Salvation, one that became ever more powerful with each time reset, as Madoka's power also increased and if created would, by the end of that same week, consume all life on Earth in order to create a paradise where there is no free will or individuality to cause strife or conflict. In the first timeline, she still possesses a high amount of power, being able to defeat Walpurgisnacht (ワルプルギスの夜, Warupurugisu no Yoru), though dying in the process. Subsequently, by the current timeline, she has the potential to be the most powerful magical girl to date. Towards the end, she learns of this and Homura's efforts to save her. After seeing the suffering of magical girls throughout history, Madoka decides to make her wish: to prevent all magical girls from the past, present, future and all other timelines, from ever becoming witches. The laws of the universe are rewritten such that at the moment that a soul gem becomes black with anguish, Madoka appears and purifies it before the magical girl passes on. As a result of this wish, she becomes an omnipotent being named Ultimate Madoka (アルティメット・まどか, Arutimetto Madoka), that exists for all time, erasing her pre-ascension existence from the world; leaving only Homura – and to some extent her little brother – with the memory of her. Madoka becomes only a concept in the new world, one named the Law of Cycles (円環の理, Enkan no Kotowari). Magical girls absorbed into the Law of Cycles regain knowledge of their lives in previous timelines.

At the end of Rebellion, Ultimate Madoka was usurped by Homura and had her human selves split, with her role as a martyr being forced onto the Incubators. Homura places human Madoka in a new universe where she and her friends can live normal lives unaware of their pasts, though Madoka almost regains her memories at the last second and her final conversation with Homura implies that it is only a matter of time before Madoka merges with her self once more and must face her friend in battle.

Madoka will return in Puella Magi Madoka Magica The Movie - Walpurgisnacht: Rising.

=== Appearances in other media ===
A drama CD written by Gen Urobuchi that explores other aspects of Madoka's life was released along with the anime series' Blu-ray disc.

Being the protagonist of the franchise, Madoka has almost always appeared in all manga related to Puella Magi Madoka Magica. She is a supporting character in the manga spin-off Puella Magi Madoka Magica: The Different Story, with her role being very much the same as that in the anime series. Madoka also briefly appears in Puella Magi Oriko Magica, in which she gets killed by the main character of the manga Oriko Mikune. Madoka also appears in a spin-off manga Puella Magi Madoka Magica: Homura's Revenge, that takes place in an alternate universe story where Madoka joined Homura in her time traveling, and in another manga, Puella Magi Madoka Magica: Wraith Arc, that takes place between the second film Eternal and the third film Rebellion. Additionally, Madoka appears in a novel adaptation of the original series written by Hajime Ninomae, illustrated by Yūpon and published by Nitroplus, as well as appearing in a manga adaptation of the anime series, written and illustrated by Honakogae, and published by Houbunsha.

Madoka is a playable character in most Puella Magi Madoka Magica video games, such as the PlayStation Portable action video game developed by Namco Bandai Games, Puella Magi Madoka Magica Portable (2012), and the PlayStation Vita titled Puella Magi Madoka Magica: The Battle Pentagram (2013). She also appears in several pachinko games related to the series, including Slot Puella Magi Madoka Magica (2013), Slot Puella Magi Madoka Magica 2 (2016), CR Pachinko Puella Magi Madoka Magica (2017), SLOT Puella Magi Madoka Magica A (2017), and the 2019 Slot Puella Magi Madoka Magica the Movie: Rebellion. She is a playable character in Magia Record, and was played by Akari Nibu in its stage play version.

Madoka is also a playable character in numerous games outside the Puella Magi Madoka Magica video games, such as Chain Chronicle, Million Arthur, and the rhythm game Girl Friend Note. Both Madoka and her Ultimate form also appear in the mobile game Puyo Puyo Quest. Madoka's magical girl costume appears as an alternative for the character Elize Lutus from Tales of Xillia 2, though Madoka herself does not appear. Her costume and weapons also appear in the game Phantasy Star Online 2, as well as the PSP game Gods Eater Burst, being available as downloadable content (DLC).

Madoka has also been made as a downloadable playable fighter in the engine fighting game M.U.G.E.N. Different versions of the character have been made.

== Cultural impact ==
=== Popularity ===
In 2011, Madoka took second place in the Best Female Character category at the 1st Newtype Anime Awards. She won the "Queen Award" at the 2012 Nikkan Sports Anime Competition. In 2013, Madoka won the Saimoe Tournament award for being the "most moe" anime character. In an NHK poll conducted in 2013, Madoka placed seventh for top 10 anime heroines. In 2014, Akihabara fans voted Madoka as their favorite pink-haired heroine. In 2016, Madoka was voted as the fifth most popular SHAFT heroine. Japanese Tokyo Broadcasting System Television announcer Misato Ugaki cosplayed as Madoka in 2018. She was voted the most enchanting magical girl character in a 2016 poll by Charapedia. Goo Ranking users voted Madoka as the sixth best anime archer in 2018. In 2020, Madoka was voted the best-magical girl character in a poll by Anime! Anime!, with a 15% of votes. In a 2020 Ani Trending News poll, Madoka was also voted as the second best female anime character of Winter 2011, and the eighth best female character of the year (2011) overall. Aoi Yūki won several awards for her portrayal of the character, that includes the 6th Seiyu Award's Best Actress in leading role in 2012, as well as the Newtype Anime Award for Best Actress, and the Nikkan Sports for MIP Female Voice Actor Award.

=== Critical response ===
Madoka's character has been well received by critics. Rachael Verret of The Mary Sue praised Madoka's character development for changing from a "naive, noncommittal little girl to someone who recognizes the necessity of relying and trusting in herself, turning into a fully actualized woman taking the power back in a hopeless situation," and referred to her transformation as a "pretty jaw-dropping scene". Theorin Martin from Anime News Network listed Madoka making her wish as "Scene of the Year" of 2012, complimenting how her wish "was the culmination of everything that she had learned over the course of the series and everything that she was as a character", calling it "masterstroke". Lynzee Loveridge of the same site listed Madoka third in "biggest crybaby heroes" list, noting how Madoka experiences horrible things throughout the story despite being a normal girl, stating that it makes her "more relatable to the audience". Juliet Kahn of Looper liked how Madoka developed "from a naive young girl into a terrified pawn" and praised the character for realizing her power and for changing the world from despair to a better place, stating that "the momentum this creates is felt on the most visceral level, catapulting the viewer from horror into awe within one episode". THEM Anime Reviews reviewer Jacob Churosh stated that it is easy to view Madoka as a useless character but "there are moments where we see that she is no coward", and "that this kind of desperation is new to her and she knows there is something wrong with her attitude". James Beckett from Anime News Network stated that while Madoka may not be the most important character of the series' first episodes, "her deep and complex emotional resonance with every other character" in the series "made her a vital thread in the fabric of its story". Zac Bertschy from the same site felt that Madoka "does not have that much to do" in first few episodes, and believed that she had played a bigger role in the rest of the story. Furthermore, he praised her "intense" transformation and characterization for the last episodes, stating "it winds up justifying all the self-doubt the Madoka character goes through in the episodes leading up to this and feels like an even bigger take (and gentle commentary on) the entire idea of a "magical girl" and called her the "very concept of hope itself" that was "immensely emotionally satisfying" to watch.

Madoka's relationship with Homura has also been met with positive critical response. Jacob Hope Chapman from Anime News Network noted how more powerful became Madoka and Homura's relationship which he also considered one of the film's greatest strengths. Geoff Berkshire from Variety described Madoka and Homura's friendship as "deep" and "loving". David West of Neo said that Urobuchi "takes their friendship and flips it inside-out." West wrote; "Far more complicated than merely turning friends into enemies, Rebellion takes their relationship and stands it in front of a funhouse mirror." Writing for A Cycle, Not a Phase: Love Between Magical Girls Amidst the Trauma of Puella Magi Madoka Magica, Kevin Cooley argues that Homura's powers are not merely a "metaphor for love between magical girls," but "literally are the love between magical girls" and that Madoka's actions create a world "where love between women can prosper free from Kyubey's policing." Kory Cerjak from The Fandom Post praised the work of Christine Marie Cabanos, Madoka's voice actress, noting that while it felt like "an adult playing a junior high school student" in the series' beginning, by the movies, it had become more appealing and suitable.

=== Analysis ===
Japanese critic Kenichi Yamakawa noted the contrasts between Madoka and Homura, stating Madoka represents "people's justice" while Homura represents "human love". Sociologist Shinji Miyadai noted that Madoka is a heroine who moves forward and never looks back. He stated that the story is about Madoka's growth; an average girl that realizes the bonds between those surrounding her and the people supporting her, which eventually made her accept her role and fulfill her duty in saving magical girls from their cruel fate. Additionally, critic Tetsuya Miyazaki believes that Puella Magi Madoka Magica refers to the causal view of Buddhism and adopts the world setting of "hope is born from despair". Miyazaki believes that the theme of the story is about Madoka growing up and saves all magical girls, and referred to her as an ordinary girl that follows the steps of Bodhisattva and Tathagata. Miyazaki further commented on Madoka creating a new world, to which he described as the pure land and said Madoka herself becomes omnipresent in this universe by turning into a person that transcends time and laws. Furthermore, Miyazaki also found Madoka realizing her destiny and making an independent choice in the final episode as magnificent.

Critic Ryōta Fujitsu believes that the series should be analyzed from the context of beautiful girl games and sci-fi literature, and described the story as "understanding mother's lifestyle and taking it as a decision in life", and the coming of age story of Madoka. Fujitsu also believes that in episode 11, Madoka's determination to confront her mother until her mother watched Madoka leave was the most exciting part of the plot of the series. According to comments in SPA magazine, the deep friendship and bond of Madoka and Homura caused a miracle to happen, with Madoka developing into a realized person due to learning about Homura's sufferings and the support of her mother Junko.

Writing for The Very Soil: An Unauthorized Critical Study of Puella Magi Madoka Magica, Jen A. Blue said that Madoka resembles the Bodhisattva Guanyin, a figure from Buddhist mythology, as Madoka takes the suffering of all magical girls and guides them to her heaven and said that Madoka "becomes a force of nature, an incarnation of hope, dissolving her consciousness, and attaining nirvana". Similarly, Madoka has also been compared to Goethe's character Gretchen from Faust, Blue said: "Madoka's wish to guide magical girls away from being witches parallels Gretchen's wish to guide Faust into Heaven. Madoka also takes on a role as a savior and protector, similar to that taken in Faust by the Marian, divine principle of the eternal feminine, with which Gretchen is associated". Noelle Ogawa of Crunchyroll called her a "somewhat unconventional main character", and that she "never becomes the superpowered hero that fights monsters and villains. She does not even start out with the desire to change the world, she grows into the role of being the world's savior".
