= Gekidan Inu Curry =

Japanese anime artist duo

- 劇団イヌカレー
- Official illustration of Gekidan Inu Curry depicting Doroinu (left) and 2shiroinu (right)
- Notable work: Sayonara, Zetsubou-Sensei; Puella Magi Madoka Magica; Maria Holic; Magia Record: Puella Magi Madoka Magica Side Story
- Style: Russian and Czech inspired Stop-motion animation
- Website: http://uchu-kibo.chu.jp/

Gekidan Inu Curry (Japanese: 劇団イヌカレー, Hepburn: Gekidan Inu Karē; "Theatrical Company Dog Curry"), stylized as gekidan INU CURRY, is an animation troupe consisting of animator Ayumi Shiraishi (白石 亜由美, Shiraishi Ayumi) known as 2-Shiroinu (2白犬; "2-White Dog") and colorist Yōsuke Anai (穴井 洋輔, Anai Yōsuke) known as Doroinu (泥犬; "Muddy Dog"). They are known for their production design work in the Puella Magi Madoka Magica series, as well as creating the ending credits sequences for Maria Holic and Usagi Drop. They also regularly contribute illustrations to Maaya Sakamoto's Manpukuron column in Newtype magazine.

== Careers ==
=== Before Gekidan Inu Curry ===
Both 2shiroinu and Doroinu started their careers in the anime industry in the early 2000s after both graduating from Yoyogi Animation Academy. In 2002, 2shiroinu joined animation production house Gainax as an animator, while Doroinu joined sub-contracting studio Tanto as a digital painter and special effects artist in 2003. While 2shiroinu succeeded in finding herself across a number of different works, both in and out of Gainax's sphere, Doroinu struggled with moving up with his work at Tanto which eventually closed down in 2007. With both in a position to try something new, and shared artistic sensibilities uniting them, they created the Gekidan Inu Curry troupe in 2007.

=== Gekidan Inu Curry ===
The duo started by contributing their work to the blog website DecoBlog, which launched in March 2007 and was shut down in December 2008. The pair was in charge for the designs of the little devils (usako, ouji, momeme & kotori) and illustrations of the website like deco-parts that users would use to decorate their blog page. They also created a video for the website's opening that animated the story of DecoBlog's inception.

Maaya Sakamoto noticed their work on the website and wanted to collaborate with them on a music video for her song Universe. In early 2007, with the support of animation studio Production I.G, the music video was officially released as an extra on her 30minutes Flight Night concept album. Later in the year, both members worked on Gainax's Gurren Lagann, with both of them animating a sequence in episode 11, and 2shiroinu also helping with creature designs. In 2008, they were asked to do work for studio Shaft by director Yukihiro Miyamoto, who was also classmates with the two. The two were put in charge of directing an opening for the Goku Sayonara, Zetsoubou-Sensei OVA, and would again be asked to do a lengthy sequence of the series' third season, and create another opening for its OVA as well. Other directors and productions at the studio by this time had noticed the two and started asking for their appearances in various ways like creating the ending animation for Maria Holic, as well as appearances in animating episodic segments or other minor design work. Director Tatsuya Oishi had seen Gekidan Inu Curry's work for the Maria Holic ending before he directed its opening and used their work as motivation to "not lose" to anyone, and the two would later in the year be asked to do some segments of Bakemonogatari, which Shaft's chief director Akiyuki Shinbo had put him in charge of as series director.

The crux of Gekidan Inu Curry's early collaborations with Shaft came with the production of Puella Magi Madoka Magica in 2011. They were approached early on during the pre-production stage to contribute to the production design, where they would eventually receive credit for the alternate world designs; but the two also had authority over aspects of the series that director Shinbo had given to them through script and storyboard revisions. The two outlined and wrote the backstories for the witches themselves as series writer Gen Urobuchi had not. Urobuchi later stated that the quotes and motifs from Through the Looking Glass and Faust used in the series were also Gekidan Inu Curry's ideas rather than his. Early on, before Gekidan Inu Curry were brought onto the project, the members of Magica Quartet (Shinbo, Urobuchi, artist Ume Aoki, and Shaft) were meeting and exchanging ideas for the series. Urobuchi was initially concerned as he believed the Shaft-Shinbo-Aoki team to be that of Hidamari Sketch, an adaptation of Aoki's manga headed by Shinbo and Shaft about girls at an art school. Urobuchi read the Hidamari Sketch manga to grasp the character style, but still found it difficult for him to understand even after viewing Shinbo's previous magical girl series, Magical Girl Lyrical Nanoha (2004), and his gothic horror OVA, Le Portrait de Petit Cossette (2004), which had music composed by Yuki Kajiura who would also end up composing the music for Madoka. Although he struggled with this, it was eventually when Gekidan Inu Curry were brought onto the project that Urobuchi believed he could successfully link the two ideas together to create a magical girl anime. In their initial meeting, Shinbo also told Gekidan Inu Curry that Madoka was unlike Magical Girl Lyrical Nanoha and more akin to an extension of Le Portrait de Petit Cossette. Miyamoto was originally not attached to the project as he was busy with Arakawa Under the Bridge (2010) as its series director, but he had seen design material, including Gekidan Inu Curry's, at the Shaft office and humorously lamented that the series would end up pulling resources away from Arakawa. Ironically, a few months before broadcast, Miyamoto himself was pulled in to work on Madoka Magica as its series director as well.

While still working on Madoka Magica, the two found time over the years to contribute to some of Production I.G's other works, with both members independently participating on A Letter to Momo (2011) and together creating the ending animation for Usagi Drop (2011), as well as the duo publishg a short manga, Pomeromeko, in 2012. Though the Madoka Magica television series had ended, the franchise ramped up for a theatrical trilogy release of the series in 2012 and 2013, the first two of which, Beginnings and Eternal, did not include new scenes but had heavily updated animation and designs. Shaft president Mitsutoshi Kubota encountered Miyamoto at a convenience store near the Shaft office one day and asked him to be the director (with Shinbo acting as chief director) of the movies which he agreed to. The third film, titled Rebellion, was also in the works and was eventually decided as a direct sequel to the series, with Gekidan Inu Curry becoming increasingly involved in the production of the films, especially Rebellion. Like with the TV series, the two were involved with the alternate space production design work, but also contributed to the dialogue of character Nagisa Momoe and wrote additionally scenes into the screenplay like the opening "tea party" sequence. Commenting on their work, Shinbo said that he liked to try and make things more "unusual" in his works, but found that Gekidan Inu Curry's contributions were amazing enough as they were. Art director Ken Naitou and analog artist Youichi Nangou, from art company Studio Tulip, were primarily involved in supporting Gekidan Inu Curry's ambitions with the alternate space's designs. Director of photography Shinichirou Etou, an in-house compositor from Shaft, considered handling Gekidan Inu Curry's work to be the biggest challenge on the film but considered the staff working together to bring their art to life "without compromise" to be one of its most unique characteristics.

Since the mid-2010s, Doroinu has generally worked alone as Gekidan Inu Curry. While 2shiroinu occasionally has appeared for some works, Doroinu has been responsible for a majority of the work produced under the Gekidan Inu Curry name. In 2014, he directed some of the endings for Shaft's Nisekoi and made a brief appearance on the studios March Comes In like a Lion (2016), as well as doing extensive work for two episodes of Fate/Extra: Last Encore (2018). While doing occasional anime work, Doroinu also contributed to physical works and albums, like J.A. Seazer's album release of music for Revolutionary Girl Utena. He also became involved with the Magia Record mobile game developed by f4samurai, a spin-off of Madoka Magica, as a designer, artist, and writer.

In 2020, Doroinu was announced to be the chief director of Shaft's adaptation of the Magia Record game, which he also was the main series composition writer for. Since Doroinu was heavily involved with the game and understood it on a deeper level, Shinbo asked him to be the director with the latter serving as animation supervisor, and the only request that Shinbo gave to Doroinu was that he did not adapt the game faithfully due to what he perceived was the difficulty in translating its story across different mediums (from game to anime). Although he was chosen to be the series' director, Doroinu had limited directing experience, and had never directed a full-length television series. To assist him with the work, the first season of the series put him in the role of chief director with Miyamoto as the assistant director, and various directors (including Miyamoto, Kenjirou Okada, and Midori Yoshizawa) who understood Shaft's style put in charge of various episodes as pseudo-series directors. Since Shinbo wasn't involved with the direction, Doroinu decided that certain aspects of his and Shaft's idiosyncrasies like the "Shaft tilt" would be limited to the original Madoka Magica cast and not be used for the Magia Record cast. For the second and third seasons, Doroinu retained his "chief director" credit, but Miyamoto would instead act as director, and Yoshizawa was given the role of assistant director beneath the two. Both were pivotal in their roles, and Doroinu considered Miyamoto to be responsible for balancing the project.

A fourth film in the Madoka Magica franchise was announced in 2021 prior to the second and final seasons of Magia Record. Although initially given a 2024 release, the film was later pushed to 2025, with most of the main staff—including Shinbo, Miyamoto, Urobuchi, Aoki, Shaft, and Kajiura—returning, but Doroinu solely returning as the alternate space designer as a part of Gekidan Inu Curry.

=== Artistic style ===
Doroinu and 2shiroinu of Gekidan Inu Curry describe their works as inspired by both Russian and Czech animation styles. They expressed a preference in creating miniature landscapes that could be made by individuals instead of with working with many people "like in an orchestra".

In an interview with Maaya Sakamoto and Gekidan Inu Curry, Sakamoto described the characters used in her music video Universe, the sixth song in her album 30minutes night flight as "really colorful, cute and fantastical". Gekidan Inu Curry made the characters used in the song under Production I.G's Studio 4. However, Sakamoto noted that the characters show a "fancy atmosphere at first sight, but if you look at them carefully, you can see them injected with a needle, bandaged, or drooling." She added that the characters were "not only cute, but they also represent human imperfection." She also said that she held an "impression each character had a story behind him or her" and thought that "they were ideal actors to appear on the video". Sakamoto described the colored drawings presented to her as having a "quality of a picture book and the unrealistic feel of a fairytale as well as a dark aspect to it".

In a review of Puella Magi Madoka Magica: The Movie by Geoff Berkshire of Variety described the "nightmare" characters of the film "surreal beings resembling paper-cutout collages inspired by classical Russian and Czech animation" and said as reminiscent of Terry Gilliam's animated interludes for Monty Python.

== Animated works ==
=== Independent ===
==== Doroinu (as Yousuke Anai) ====
| Year | Type | Title | Director(s) | Studio(s) | Role(s) | Ref(s) |
|---|---|---|---|---|---|---|
| 2003 | TV | F-Zero Falcon Densetsu | Ami Tomobuki | Ashi Productions | Digital coloring | |
| 2003 | TV | Omoikkiri Kagaku Adventure Sou Nanda! | Norihiko Sutou | OLM | Coloring | |
| 2003 | Film | Gekijouban Tottoko Hamtarou: Ham-Ham Grand Prix Aurora Tani no Kiseki – Ribbon-chan Kiki Ippatsu | Osamu Dezaki | SMDE | Digital coloring | |
| 2004 | OVA | Animation Runner Kuromi 2 | Akitaro Daichi | Yumeta Company | Digital coloring | |
| 2004 | OVA | Sakura Wars: The New Paris | Yuusuke Yamamoto | Radix | Coloring | |
| 2004 | Film | The Place Promised in Our Early Days | Makoto Shinkai | CoMix Wave Films | Digital coloring | |
| 2005 | TV | Damekko Dōbutsu | Setsuko Shibuichi | Magic Bus | Coloring; Coloring inspection Color coordination Special effects | |
| 2005 | TV | Honey and Clover | Ken'ichi Kasai | J.C. Staff | Digital coloring | |
| 2005 | Film | Nagasaki 1945: Angelus no Kane | Seiji Arihara | Mushi Production | Coloring | |
| 2009 | Film | Tales of Vesperia: The First Strike | Kanta Kamei | Production I.G | 2D works | |
| 2011 | Film | A Letter to Momo | Hiroyuki Okiura | Production I.G | 2D work digital correction | |

==== 2shiroinu (as Ayumi Shiraishi) ====
| Year | Type | Title | Director(s) | Studio(s) | Role(s) | Ref(s) |
|---|---|---|---|---|---|---|
| 2002 | TV | Mahoromatic: Something More Beautiful | Hiroyuki Yamaga | Gainax; Shaft | In-between animator Key animator | |
| 2003 | TV | Kasumin 3rd Series | Mitsuru Hongo | OLM | Key animator | |
| 2004 | TV | This Ugly yet Beautiful World | Shouji Saeki | Gainax; Shaft | Key animator | |
| 2004 | OVA | Grrl Power! | Akitaro Daichi | CoMix Wave Films | Key animator | |
| 2004 | Film | Mind Game | Masaaki Yuasa | Studio 4°C | In-between animator | |
| 2004 | OVA | Diebuster | Kazuya Tsurumaki | Gainax | Key animator | |
| 2005 | TV | Futari wa Pretty Cure Max Heart | Daisuke Nishio | Toei Animation | Key animator | |
| 2005 | Film | One Piece: Baron Omatsuri and the Secret Island | Mamoru Hosoda | Toei Animation | Key animator | |
| 2005 | TV | He is My Master | Shouji Saeki | Gainax; Shaft | Key animator Eyecatch | |
| 2005 | Film | Tsubasa Reservoir Chronicle the Movie: The Princess in the Birdcage Kingdom | Itsuro Kawasaki | Production I.G | Prop designer Key animator | |
| 2006 | Film | Gunbuster vs. Diebuster | Kazuya Tsurumaki | Gainax | Key animator | |
| 2007 | TV | Den-noh Coil | Mitsuo Iso | Madhouse | Key animator | |
| 2007 | OVA | Tokyo Marble Chocolate | Naoyoshi Shiotani | Production I.G | Title logo design | |
| 2011 | Film | A Letter to Momo | Hiroyuki Okiura | Production I.G | Key animator | |
| 2020 | TV | BNA: Brand New Animal | Yoh Yoshinari | Studio Trigger | Recollection part animation | |

=== Gekidan Inu Curry ===
| Year | Type | Title | Director(s) | Studio(s) | Member | Role(s) | Ref(s) |
|---|---|---|---|---|---|---|---|
| 2007 | Music video | Maaya Sakamoto: Universe | Gekidan Inu Curry | Production I.G | Both | Public performance | |
| 2007 | TV | Gurren Lagann | Hiroyuki Imaishi | Gainax | Both | Creature design assistance (2shiroinu); Subtitle design (2shiroinu); Nia recollection part | |
| 2008 | OVA | Goku Sayonara, Zetsubou-Sensei | Akiyuki Shinbo; Yukihiro Miyamoto | Shaft | Both | Opening directors | |
| 2009 | TV | Maria Holic | Akiyuki Shinbo; Yukihiro Miyamoto | Shaft | Both | Ending animation | |
| 2009 | TV | Bakemonogatari | Akiyuki Shinbo; Tatsuya Oishi | Shaft | Doroinu | Public performance | |
| 2009 | TV | Zan Sayonara, Zetsubou-Sensei | Akiyuki Shinbo; Yukihiro Miyamoto | Shaft | Both | Public performance | |
| 2010 | OVA | Zan Sayonara, Zetsubou-Sensei Bangaichi | Akiyuki Shinbo; Yukihiro Miyamoto | Shaft | Both | Opening directors | |
| 2011 | TV | Puella Magi Madoka Magica | Akiyuki Shinbo; Yukihiro Miyamoto | Shaft | Both | Alternate space designers Key animators Storyboard corrections (uncredited) | |
| 2011 | TV | Usagi Drop | Kanta Kamei | Production I.G | Both | Ending animation | |
| 2011 | TV | Hidamari Sketch x SP | Akiyuki Shinbo | Shaft | Both | Count leader | |
| 2012 | TV | Nisemonogatari | Akiyuki Shinbo; Tomoyuki Itamura | Shaft | Both | Public performance (Doroinu); Calender design (2shiroinu) | |
| 2012 | Film | Puella Magi Madoka Magica: Beginnings | Akiyuki Shinbo; Yukihiro Miyamoto | Shaft | Both | Alternate space designers Key animators Storyboard corrections (uncredited) | |
| 2012 | Film | Puella Magi Madoka Magica: Eternal | Akiyuki Shinbo; Yukihiro Miyamoto | Shaft | Both | Alternate space designers Storyboard corrections (uncredited) | |
| 2013 | Film | Puella Magi Madoka Magica: Rebellion | Akiyuki Shinbo; Yukihiro Miyamoto | Shaft | Both | Alternate space designers Storyboard corrections (uncredited); Concept art design (Doroinu) | |
| 2014 | TV | Nisekoi | Akiyuki Shinbo; Naoyuki Tatsuwa | Shaft | Doroinu | Ending director | |
| 2015 | Short | Puella Magi Madoka Magica Concept Movie | Akiyuki Shinbo | Shaft | Both | Alternate space designers | |
| 2016 | TV | March Comes In like a Lion | Akiyuki Shinbo; Kenjirou Okada | Shaft | Doroinu | Key animation | |
| 2017 | Film | Fireworks | Akiyuki Shinbo; Nobuyuki Takeuchi | Shaft | Doroinu | Design assistance | |
| 2017 | Game | Magia Record | Kenji Taguchi; Yuuto Hosokawa | f4samurai | Doroinu | Witch/Uwasa/Minion design Doppel concept/supervisor Scenario assistance Transformation scene director In-game alternate space design In-game concept art design Ending animation | |
| 2018 | TV | Fate/Extra: Last Encore | Akiyuki Shinbo; Yukihiro Miyamoto | Shaft | Doroinu | Third Level designer Background artist Photography | |
| 2020 | TV | Magia Record | Doroinu; Yukihiro Miyamoto; Kenjirou Okada; Midori Yoshizawa | Shaft | Doroinu | Chief director Series composition Alternate space designer Screenplay | |
| 2021 | TV | Magia Record: The Eve of Awakening | Doroinu; Yukihiro Miyamoto | Shaft | Doroinu | Chief director Series composition Alternate space designer Screenplay | |
| 2022 | TV | Magia Record: Dawn of a Shallow Dream | Doroinu; Yukihiro Miyamoto | Shaft | Doroinu | Chief director Series composition Alternate space designer Storyboard art | |
| 2023 | TV | The Ancient Magus' Bride Season 2 | Kazuaki Terasawa | Studio Kafka | Doroinu | Monster material (opening animation) | |
| 2025 | Game | Puella Magi Madoka Magica: Magia Exedra | Toshiyuki Shimane; Kenichirou Yamada; Arisa Kosaka | Pokelabo f4samurai | | Witch/Uwasa/Minion supervisor Doppel concept/supervisor Opening animation material assistance | |
| 2025 | ONA | Woke-Up-as-a-Girl Syndrome | Kazuaki Terasawa | Studio Kafka | Doroinu | Expression of the inner world | |
| 2026 | TV | Nippon Sangoku | Kazuaki Terasawa | Studio Kafka | | Effects design | |
| 2026 | Film | The Ribbon Hero | Yuuki Igarashi | Outline | Doroinu | Inu Curry Theater | |
| 2026 | Film | Puella Magi Madoka Magica: Walpurgisnacht – Rising | Akiyuki Shinbo; Yukihiro Miyamoto | Shaft | Doroinu | Alternate space designer Screenplay assistance | |

== Notes ==
=== Works cited ===
- Misaka, Taiji, ed. (2009). まりあ†ほりっく アニメ公式ガイドブック [Maria Holic Anime Official Guidebook]. Media Factory. ISBN 978-4840129312.
- Magica Quartet (2011). 魔法少女まどか☆マギカ公式ガイドブック you are not alone. [Puella Magi Madoka Magica Official Guidebook you are not alone.]. Houbunsha. ISBN 978-4832240612.
- Shinbo, Akiyuki (July 27, 2012). 新房語 [Shinbogatari] (in Japanese). Ichijinsha. ISBN 978-4758012591.
- Magica Quartet (2013). 劇場版 魔法少女まどか☆マギカ [前編]始まりの物語/[後編]永遠の物語 公式ガイドブック with you. [Puella Magi Madoka Magica The Movie [Part 1] Beginning / [Part 2] Eternal Official Guidebook with you.]. Houbunsha. ISBN 978-4832243323.
- Kizawa, Yukito; Takayama, Atsushi; Saitou, Fusano, eds. (2014). 劇場版魔法やまどかマギカ[新編]叛逆の物語公式ガイドブック only you. [Movie Version Puella Magi Madoka Magica [New Edition] Story of Rebellion Official Guidebook only you.]. Houbunsha. ISBN 978-4832244290.
- Oota, Keiji; Shaft (August 18, 2017). パンフレット 打ち上げ花火、下から見るか?横から見るか? [Pamphlet: Fireworks, Should We See It from the Side or the Bottom?] (in Japanese). Toho.
- Maeda, Hisashi; Nakagami, Yoshikatsu; Kawabata, Takeshi; Nishitani, Nanako (2020). マギアレコード 魔法少女まどか☆マギカ外伝 TVアニメ公式ガイドブック 1巻 [Magia Record Puella Magi Madoka Magica TV Anime Official Guidebook Volume 1] (in Japanese). Houbunsha. ISBN 978-4832272019.
- Maeda, Hisashi; Nakagami, Yoshikatsu; Kawabata, Takeshi; Nishitani, Nanako (2022). マギアレコード 魔法少女まどか☆マギカ外伝 TVアニメ公式ガイドブック 2巻 [Magia Record Puella Magi Madoka Magica TV Anime Official Guidebook Volume 2] (in Japanese). Houbunsha. ISBN 978-4832274006.
