= Mami Tomoe =

Puella Magi Madoka Magica character

- Puella Magi Madoka Magica character
- Mami Tomoe wielding her flintlock rifle, artwork by Ume Aoki
- First appearance: "As If I Met Her in My Dream…"
- Created by: Akiyuki Shinbo; Gen Urobuchi; Ume Aoki
- Portrayed by: Shiho Katō (Magia Record stage play)
- Voiced by: Japanese: Kaori Mizuhashi; English: Carrie Keranen

In-universe information
- Species: Human (initially); Magical girl
- Gender: Female
- Weapon: Flintlock rifle; Cannon; Ribbon

Mami Tomoe (Japanese: 巴 マミ, Hepburn: Tomoe Mami) is a fictional character from the 2011 anime series Puella Magi Madoka Magica. Mami is a veteran magical girl and a third-year student at Mitakihara middle school. She acts as a mentor to Madoka Kaname and Sayaka Miki should they choose to become magical girls by making contract with Kyubey. Mami plays a pivotal role in the first arc of Magia Record, appearing as one of the primary antagonists.

== Character design ==
Designed by Ume Aoki, Mami's color motif was initially red per Gen Urobuchi's suggestion, but Aoki changed it to yellow; red was used instead for Kyoko Sakura. The color of her soul gem is orange, and when transforming into her magical girl outfit, her hair ornament is attached to the right side of her head.

== Appearances ==
=== In Madoka Magica ===
An experienced magical girl, Mami rescues Madoka Kaname and Sayaka Miki from a witch's barrier and decides to act as a mentor to them should they choose to become magical girls. She lives alone in an apartment after the death of her parents in a car accident, during which she was only able to survive by contracting with Kyubey to save her own life.

Mami fights with the belief that she would protect others from the threat of witches and their familiars, and her appearance had a great influence on Madoka and Sayaka. However, although she appears as a reliable senior in front of them, beneath this facade is someone who deeply suffers from loneliness. Mami laments to Madoka that her job as a magical girl has left her lonely. Hearing this, Madoka confesses to Mami that she wants to become a magical girl like her and fight alongside her, making Mami feel joy and happiness. Mami then shows off by fighting the doll-like witch Charlotte only for the witch to suddenly transform into a huge caterpillar-like creature that kills Mami right before Madoka's eyes.

As the series progress, it is revealed by Kyubey that Mami never learned the truth about witches and magical girls; as witches are the final forms of magical girls. Having been ignorant of the magical girls' purpose and the witches' true nature, Mami learned the truth in one of the previous timelines in Homura's timeloops. Acting calmly and calculative upon learning this revelation, seeing it as the only way to prevent more witches from appearing, Mami murdered Kyoko and attempted to kill Homura before being killed by Madoka. Mami is later revived in the new timeline by Ultimate Madoka along with Kyoko as they support Homura.

Puella Magi Madoka Magica the Movie: Rebellion shows that Mami has the potential to become one of the most powerful magical girls if in peak form when she isn't held back by her crippling loneliness (as a result of her becoming close friends with Charlotte's original form Nagisa in the guise of Bebe). After Homura rewrites reality, Mami is seen saving Nagisa from falling packages of cheese, implying the two remain friends.

=== Other appearances ===
Mami has appeared in several manga related to Madoka Magica. She is the main protagonist alongside Kyoko Sakura in the Puella Magi Madoka Magica: The Different Story manga, which reveals that Mami had previously been Kyoko's partner but was left alone after they fought over their ideals. She also appears in the Puella Magi Madoka Magica: Wraith Arc manga, set between the Eternal and Rebellion films, where she fights the wraiths with Kyoko and Homura. In Puella Magi Oriko Magica, Mami investigates the magical girl killings then she encounters a girl named Kirika Kure, who is revealed to be killing magical girls as per Oriko's requests. The two engage in a battle. She also appears in a novel adaptation of the original series written by Hajime Ninomae, illustrated by Yūpon and published by Nitroplus. She also appears in manga adaptation of the anime series, written and illustrated by Honakogae, and published by Houbunsha.

Mami is a playable character in every Madoka Magica video game, including Puella Magi Madoka Magica Portable (the 2012 PlayStation Portable action game developed by Namco Bandai Games) and the 2013 PlayStation Vita game Puella Magi Madoka Magica: The Battle Pentagram. Mami also appears in many Madoka Magica pachinko games, including Slot Puella Magi Madoka Magica (2013), Slot Puella Magi Madoka Magica 2 (2016), CR Pachinko Puella Magi Madoka Magica (2017), SLOT Puella Magi Madoka Magica A (2017), and Slot Puella Magi Madoka Magica the Movie: Rebellion (2019). She has also appeared in several crossover games, such as Kaden Shoujo, Chain Chronicle, Million Arthur, Girl Friend Note, Phantom of the Kill, and Puyo Puyo Quest. Mami is a playable character in Magia Record, and was played by Shiho Katō in its stage play version.

== Cultural impact ==
Mami has been popular in Japan. In 2012, her death was voted the most memorable anime death by BIGLOBE users. In another poll of "Which Anime Character They Wish Hadn't Died", had Mami placed second. In a 2014 Charapedia poll, Mami's death took third place that left the biggest impact. In another 2015 Charapedia poll, Mami was voted second character "Who Deserve Their Own Anime Series". Mami is also one of Shaft's most popular heroines, placing ninth on its 2016 Top 10 Shaft Heroines list. Mami placed 6th, with 277 votes, in a Charapedia poll asking fans to list the 20 best anime magical girls. In 2017, "GooRanking" voted Mami's death as the second most shocking anime death. In 2020, Mami was voted the 9th best magical girl character in a poll by Anime! Anime!.

Kory Cerjak of The Fandom Post said Mami's death "hits hard" and praised her English voice actress, Carrie Keranen, for providing "a voice that sounds at once young-ish and motherly", stating that "it's comforting just to listen to her speak because of the parental demeanor in it." Mami's character in the spin-off manga The Different Story was praised by Rebecca Silverman from Anime News Network, who called her a "fascinating" character and liked her connection with Madoka, stating that "Mami could have been Madoka as she has the requisite selflessness that all true magical girls exhibit." Silverman enjoyed the manga for exploring Mami's guilt and for knowing "Mami as a character rather than a tragedy", and stated that her story "is perhaps a way to see what happens when being human wins out over being a magical girl."
