= List of Puella Magi Madoka Magica episodes =

The cover of the sixth Puella Magi Madoka Magica home media release volume, featuring the main characters

Puella Magi Madoka Magica is a 2011 Japanese anime television series created by Magica Quartet (consisting of Akiyuki Shinbo, Atsuhiro Iwakami, Gen Urobuchi, and Ume Aoki), produced by Shaft, and distributed by Aniplex. It follows the story of 14-year-old middle school student Madoka Kaname, who is offered the chance to have any wish granted on the condition that she become a magical girl and fight against evil witches.

Puella Magi Madoka Magica began development after Akiyuki Shinbo expressed his desire to work on a new magical girl series to producer Atsuhiro Iwakami while they were working on Hidamari Sketch and Bakemonogatari. During the early planning stage, Iwakami decided not to adapt an existing work in order to give Shinbo more freedom in his direction style. Gen Urobuchi and Ume Aoki then joined the project as scriptwriter and character designer respectively. The series was announced in a commercial slot during the anime series Togainu no Chi. Subsequently, more commercials were shown in the same slot revealing the characters and cast.

The first ten episodes aired on Japanese television channels MBS, TBS and CBC between January 7, and March 11, 2011. Due to the Tōhoku earthquake and tsunami, the broadcasts of episodes 11 and 12 were delayed and were later aired as a double feature on April 22, 2011. The series was released on Blu-ray (BD) and DVD between April 27, and September 21, 2011, having been delayed from the original release date of March 30, 2011, due to the earthquake. Aniplex USA licensed the series in North America and released the series in three volumes between February 14, and June 12, 2012. Manga Entertainment licensed the series in the United Kingdom and released it on BD/DVD in a complete collection on October 22, 2012.

The opening theme is "Connect" (コネクト, Konekuto) by ClariS and the ending theme is "Magia" by Kalafina. On the DVD/Blu-ray release, the ending theme for episodes one and two is "See you Tomorrow" (また あした, Mata Ashita) by Aoi Yūki; and the ending theme for episode nine is "And I'm Home" by Eri Kitamura and Ai Nonaka. Drama CDs are included with the first; third; and fifth DVD/Blu-ray volumes; and the original soundtrack by Kajiura Yuki was included in three parts with the second; fourth; and sixth volumes. The soundtrack is also included with the limited-edition North American releases.

Seven episodes were outsourced to other studios: episode 4 to Artland; episode 5 to Diomedéa; episode 6 to C2C; episode 7 to David Production; episode 8 to SynergySP; episode 9 to Tezuka Productions and Production Reed; and episode 11 to Madhouse. (Note: Outsourcing studios credited as Animation Co-operation (協力アニメーション) on their respective episodes.)

The series was retold in two films, Beginnings and Eternal, released in October 2012. A third film featuring an original story, Rebellion, was released in October 2013. A sequel film to Rebellion, titled Walpurgisnacht: Rising, premiered in August 2026.

== Episode list ==
No.	Title	Directed by	Storyboarded by (Note: As listed in the ending credits to each episode, denoted as storyboard artist (絵コンテ).)	Original release date
1	"I First Met Her in a Dream... or Something."; Transliteration: "Yume no Naka de Atta, Yō na..." (Japanese: 夢の中で逢った、ような…)	Yukihiro Miyamoto	Yoshiharu Ashino	January 7, 2011
Middle-school student Madoka Kaname is surprised to find the girl from her dream, Homura Akemi, enroll in her school the following day. Homura, who seems to already know her, warns Madoka to stay the way she is or risk losing everything. After school when Madoka goes shopping with her friend Sayaka Miki, she hears a strange voice leading her to an abandoned section of the mall. She encounters a strange cat-like creature called Kyubey being attacked by Homura, who is revealed to be a magical girl. As Homura demands Madoka stay away from Kyubey, Sayaka arrives and escapes with Madoka only for them to be caught in a magical barrier and approached by strange monsters. They are rescued by another magical girl named Mami Tomoe, who repels the attackers with her magic abilities. Homura appears again and is confronted by Mami, who tells her that she will overlook the attack on Kyubey as she does not want to fight in front of the other girls. Homura leaves afterwards. Kyubey is healed by Mami's powers and explains that he wishes to form a contract with Madoka and Sayaka to make them magical girls.
2	"That Would Be Truly Wonderful"; Transliteration: "Sore wa Tottemo Ureshii Natte" (Japanese: それはとっても嬉しいなって)	Masahiro Mukai	Yoshiharu Ashino	January 14, 2011
Mami and Kyubey explain to Madoka and Sayaka that Kyubey has the power to grant wishes, but in exchange those who make wishes must become magical girls to fight witches who are born from curses. Mami offers to take Madoka and Sayaka with her on a witch hunt to determine whether there is a wish they would risk their lives for. The next day Kyubey (who cannot be seen by normal people) accompanies Madoka and Sayaka to school where they learn to communicate with each other telepathically. Homura visits Madoka once again to repeat her warning and refuses to answer when Madoka asks what her wish was. After school, Madoka, Sayaka and Mami follow the aura of the witch from the previous day to an abandoned building where they save a woman controlled by a witch from committing suicide. They enter a portal inside the building where Mami finds and defeats the witch responsible, earning a Grief Seed which can be used to recover magical power.
3	"I'm Not Afraid of Anything Anymore"; Transliteration: "Mō Nani mo Kowakunai" (Japanese: もう何も恐くない)	Yuki Yase	Yoshiharu Ashino	January 21, 2011
Sayaka visits an injured boy named Kyōsuke Kamijō, who was a violin player she admired when she was little. After defeating a witch's familiar, Mami tells Madoka and Sayaka that she was in a traffic accident and did not have time to think about her wish. She also lets Sayaka know about the precedents for wishing on behalf of other people. Later that night as Madoka helps her mother and talks with her father, Mami is approached by Homura who warns her about making Madoka a magical girl. The next day while visiting the hospital, Madoka and Sayaka find a Grief Seed that is close to activating; Sayaka and Kyubey enter the portal ahead of them while Madoka goes to find Mami. As Madoka and Mami catch up with them Homura tries to warn Mami about the witch, but Mami binds her to stop her from following them. As they continue, Madoka mentions that her wish is to simply be a magical girl and help others. Mami laments that her job as a magical girl has left her lonely and afraid but on the other hand feels happy that Madoka wishes to fight alongside her. Mami fights the doll-like witch Charlotte only for the witch to suddenly transform into a huge caterpillar-like creature that kills Mami right before Madoka's eyes. Homura, freed as a result of Mami's demise, defeats Charlotte and claims the Grief Seed before leaving a horrified Madoka and a heavily resentful Sayaka behind.
4	"Miracles and Magic Are Real"; Transliteration: "Kiseki mo, Mahō mo, Arun da yo" (Japanese: 奇跡も、魔法も、あるんだよ)	Shinichi Omata	Shinsaku Sasaki	January 28, 2011
As Sayaka continues to worry over Kyōsuke, Madoka admits she is too scared to become a magical girl after witnessing Mami's death, so Kyubey decides to let her be. Madoka is approached by Homura who tells her that Mami, along with other magical girls she has seen die during her time, will only be considered missing by normal people. Madoka says she will never forget Mami or the fact that Homura saved her life. Though Homura warns her that her kindness may be used against her. As Kyōsuke becomes more frustrated and desperate about his condition which keeps him from being able to play the violin, Sayaka decides to contract with Kyubey. Out in the city Madoka notices several people infected by the kiss of the witch Charlotte, including her classmate Hitomi Shizuki, preparing to perform mass suicide by mixing cleaning agents. When Madoka thwarts the attempted mass suicide, they chase her to a closet where she is caught by a witch who tortures her with memories of Mami's death. She is rescued by Sayaka, who had become a magical girl after using her wish to cure Kyōsuke's hand, much to the shock of Homura. Elsewhere, Kyubey greets a recently-arrived magical girl named Kyoko Sakura, who is unhappy that Sayaka took over the area Mami once looked after.
5	"There's No Way I'll Ever Regret It"; Transliteration: "Kōkai nante, Aru Wakenai" (Japanese: 後悔なんて、あるわけない)	Takahiro Majima	Shinichi Omata	February 4, 2011
Both Madoka and Homura show concern about Sayaka's decision to become a magical girl. Sayaka visits Kyōsuke and feels happy that he is finally able to play his violin once again. Madoka asks Homura to become friends with Sayaka, not wanting her to suffer the same fate as Mami, though Homura's words that those who become magical girls cannot be saved do nothing to comfort her. Later that day Madoka joins Sayaka to search for a witch's familiar, but it escapes when Sayaka's attacks are blocked by Kyōko, who only cares about collecting Grief Seeds from mature witches. Kyōko's selfishness angers Sayaka, and the two magical girls clash violently, with Madoka unable to do anything to stop them. As Kyōko gets the upper hand, Madoka considers using her wish to stop the fighting, but Homura steps in before she can do so.
6	"This Just Can't Be Right"; Transliteration: "Konna no Zettai Okashii yo" (Japanese: こんなの絶対おかしいよ)	Fujiaki Asari	Shinsaku Sasaki	February 11, 2011
Homura knocks Sayaka unconscious and gets Kyōko to leave before, once again, telling Madoka to not get involved and insisting on her giving up on Sayaka. Kyubey talks to Sayaka about the potential Madoka has to become a magical girl, but Sayaka insists that she does not want Madoka to get involved. Homura confronts Kyōko, mentioning that something known as Walpurgisnacht is approaching in two weeks; Kyōko agrees to form an alliance with her to fight against it. Madoka becomes concerned about Sayaka, who ignores her pleas to try talking with Kyōko and shows hatred towards Homura, whom she blames for Mami's death. The next evening, Sayaka is confronted by Kyōko again who goads her into another fight on top of a highway bridge. Before the battle can begin Madoka arrives and throws Sayaka's Soul Gem, the source of her magic energy, off the bridge, hoping this would stop the fight. Sayaka suddenly drops lifeless, shocking both Madoka and Kyōko. Kyubey reveals that as part of the contract, the Soul Gem literally contains the magical girl's soul, while their body is a shell that can only be controlled within 100 metres of the Soul Gem. Homura rushes to retrieve the Soul Gem and brings it back to Sayaka, reviving her.
7	"Can You Face Your True Feelings?"; Transliteration: "Hontō no Kimochi to Mukiaemasu ka?" (Japanese: 本当の気持ちと向き合えますか？)	Seimei Kidokoro	Masayoshi Nishida	February 18, 2011
Sayaka gets angry at Kyubey for not talking to her about her soul's relocation as part of her contract; in response, Kyubey explains this to her. He painfully punishes Sayaka by touching her Soul Gem, because she was not hurt by Kyōko. The next day, Madoka asks Homura about Kyubey not mentioning his manipulation of Sayaka's Soul Gem to them. Kyōko talks with Sayaka, taking her to a church which belonged to her father before he was excommunicated for his controversial beliefs. She explains how she made a contract with Kyubey so that people would listen to her father's sermons, but when he found out about her wish he broke down and killed himself and his family, leaving Kyōko alone. Sayaka apologizes to Kyōko but refuses to listen to her advice to live for herself. The next day, Kyōsuke returns to school, but Sayaka avoids talking to him. Hitomi confronts her about it and reveals she also likes Kyōsuke, giving Sayaka one day to confess to him before she does. Sayaka breaks down in front of Madoka, believing that she can never be with Kyōsuke as she feels she is no longer human. As Sayaka fights against a witch that night, she ignores Kyōko's help and recklessly attacks the witch without regard to the damage caused to her body, laughing maniacally.
8	"I Was Stupid... So Stupid"; Transliteration: "Atashitte, Honto Baka" (Japanese: あたしって、ほんとバカ)	Takashi Kawabata	Shinichi Omata	February 25, 2011
Sayaka defeats the witch, but refuses to take the Grief Seed it produces. Madoka tries to reason with Sayaka, who blames Madoka for her state before running off. As Homura and Kyōko discuss Walpurgisnacht, Kyubey approaches them and mentions that something bad will happen if Sayaka's Soul Gem is not cleansed. Sayaka does not return home that night and just watches as Hitomi confesses to Kyōsuke the next day, sending her further into despair. Homura approaches her and tries to offer a Grief Seed, but Sayaka rejects it again as she does not trust her. Homura prepares to kill Sayaka to spare Madoka from the suffering of watching Sayaka's downfall, but Kyōko intervenes, helping Sayaka escape. Kyubey coerces Madoka into making a wish to save Sayaka, but Homura shoots him before she can do so. She breaks down before Madoka and tells her not to be so self-sacrificing. Madoka gets the feeling she has met Homura somewhere before but leaves to search for Sayaka while a replacement Kyubey appears, identifying Homura as a being from a different timeline. Kyōko finds Sayaka, who is implied to have just killed two men on the train. Sayaka admits her stupidity before her Soul Gem, which has turned completely dark, shatters, and transforms into a Grief Seed. Elsewhere, Kyubey muses that a "woman" who has yet to mature is called a "girl", and that "magical girl" (魔法少女, mahō shōjo) is the corresponding term for a "witch" (魔女, majō) who has yet to mature.
9	"I'd Never Allow That to Happen"; Transliteration: "Sonna no, Atashi ga Yurusanai" (Japanese: そんなの、あたしが許さない)	Masahiro Mukai	Noriko Nanashima (Note: A pseudonym.)	March 4, 2011
As a witch appears before Kyōko, Homura arrives and uses her time manipulation to help Kyōko escape, bringing Sayaka's body to Madoka. Homura reveals that the witch was actually Sayaka, whose Soul Gem had transformed into a Grief Seed as a result of becoming too tainted with despair. Later that night Kyubey appears before Madoka again explaining that his race, known as Incubators, choose girls in their teens and raise them to become witches in order to obtain powerful energy from the transition from hope to despair in an effort to prevent the heat death of the universe. Madoka also learns from him that Incubators are emotionless and do not understand human morals; she is upset due to the revelations. Desperately clinging to the hope that there may still be a way to save Sayaka, Kyōko asks Madoka to help her try to reach Sayaka's human feelings and to obtain her Soul Gem from the witch. As the two enter the portal to confront the witch, Kyōko takes the majority of its attacks while Madoka tries to reach Sayaka with words. However, when Sayaka ends up attacking Madoka as well, Kyōko has Homura get Madoka to safety while she sacrifices herself to destroy Sayaka. Kyubey, who knew there was no way of saving Sayaka, taunts Homura and says that with Kyōko gone she will not be able to stop Walpurgisnacht without Madoka becoming a magical girl.
10	"I Won't Rely on Anyone Anymore"; Transliteration: "Mō Dare ni mo Tayoranai" (Japanese: もう誰にも頼らない)	Yuki Yase	Shinsaku Sasaki	March 11, 2011
This episode looks at an alternate timeline in which Homura is a shy transfer student who makes friends with the cheerful Madoka. Lacking confidence in herself as she had been in hospital for the past six months, Homura is attacked by a witch but is rescued by Madoka and Mami, both of whom are magical girls. When both Madoka and Mami are killed in the battle against Walpurgisnacht, Homura makes a contract with Kyubey to send her back in time so that she can protect Madoka. She joins Madoka and Mami and learns how to use her magical powers for combat, stopping time whilst using stolen firearms and explosives. However, after the battle against Walpurgisnacht, Homura witnesses Madoka transforming into a witch and realizes Kyubey had been deceiving everyone. She attempts to tell the others during the next time loop, but they do not believe her until Sayaka becomes a witch and the remaining magical girls are forced to kill her. After the battle, Mami kills Kyōko and turns her gun on Homura in an attempt to prevent them from becoming witches. Madoka stops Mami with deadly force, leaving just her and Homura to face Walpurgisnacht. With their Soul Gems depleted, Madoka uses her last Grief Seed on Homura, begging her to return to the past to keep her from being fooled by Kyubey. She then asks Homura to kill her before she turns into a witch. Returning to the past with a colder personality, Homura attempts to keep Kyubey from making contact with Madoka in the first place and decides to fight against the witches herself. This ultimately fails and she continues to travel through multiple timelines in the hope of saving Madoka.
11	"The Only Thing I Have Left to Guide Me"; Transliteration: "Saigo ni Nokotta Michishirube" (Japanese: 最後に残った道しるべ)	Kotono Watanabe	Tomohiko Itō	April 22, 2011
Kyubey reveals to Homura that the reason Madoka has the potential to become such a powerful witch is because Homura's constant trips through time to try and save Madoka have resulted in her becoming the centerpoint of countless timelines, as the potential of a magical girl is determined by the relative effect of their role on fate. After Sayaka's funeral, Kyubey shows Madoka the history of magical girls and how it has shaped civilization, causing extreme distress to Madoka. Madoka's mother, Junko, grows concerned about her and feels her daughter is hiding something from her. Madoka goes to see Homura who unconvincingly reassures her that she can handle Walpurgisnacht and finally reveals the truth about herself. As a storm hits the city and the citizens take shelter, Homura stands alone to face Walpurgisnacht, but despite her best efforts she is overwhelmed and is eventually defeated. When Madoka hears from Kyubey that Homura may turn into a witch if the latter loses hope of saving her, Madoka prepares to go and find her. Although Junko tries to stop her, Madoka convinces her that she is doing what she believes is the right thing. As Homura begins to lose hope and is on the verge of becoming a witch, Madoka arrives with Kyubey, announcing that she plans to make her wish.
12	"My Very Best Friend"; Transliteration: "Watashi no, Saikō no Tomodachi" (Japanese: わたしの、最高の友達)	Yukihiro Miyamoto	Shinsaku Sasaki	April 22, 2011
Madoka makes the decision to become a magical girl and wishes to prevent all witches from coming into existence. The paradoxical nature of her wish causes her to transcend into a psychopomp form, and establishes a new "Law of Cycles" in which magical girls are purified and disappear into a higher plane instead of becoming witches. Homura returns to a world where Mami and Kyōko are still alive while only Homura remembers Madoka existed. She and the other magical girls continue to fight against new creatures called Wraiths and Homura vows to continue fighting in honor of Madoka. The series ends on a cliffhanger.

=== Beginnings / Eternal TV Edition ===
An 11 episode television rebroadcast of the series' compilation movies titled Puella Magi Madoka Magica: Beginnings / Eternal TV Edition (Japanese: 魔法少女まどか☆マギカ 始まりの物語 / 永遠の物語 TV Edition; lit. 'Magical Girl Madoka☆Magica: The Beginning Story / The Eternal Story TV Edition') was announced on August 20, 2025, and aired from October 12 to December 21 in Japan on MBS, TBS and their affiliated stations.

No.	Title	Directed by	Storyboarded by	Original release date	Endcard artist
1	"Make a Contract With Me and Become A Magical Girl!"; Transliteration: "Boku to Keiyaku Shite Mahō Shōjo ni Natte yo!" (Japanese: 僕と契約して魔法少女になってよ！)	Yukihiro Miyamoto, Masahiro Mukai	Yoshiharu Ashino	October 12, 2025	N/A
2	"I'm Not Afraid of Anything Anymore"; Transliteration: "Mō Nani mo Kowakunai" (Japanese: もう何も恐くない)	Yuki Yase	Yoshiharu Ashino	October 19, 2025	HundredBurger
3	"Miracles and Magic Are Real"; Transliteration: "Kiseki mo, Mahō mo, Arun da yo" (Japanese: 奇跡も、魔法も、あるんだよ)	Shinichi Omata	Shinsaku Sasaki	October 26, 2025	PAPA
4	"There's No Way I'll Ever Regret It"; Transliteration: "Kōkai Nante, Aru Wakenai" (Japanese: 後悔なんて、あるわけない)	Takahiro Majima	Shinichi Omata	November 2, 2025	Fujima Takuya
5	"This Just Can't Be Right"; Transliteration: "Konna no Zettai Okashii yo" (Japanese: こんなの絶対おかしいよ)	Fujiaki Asari	Shinsaku Sasaki	November 9, 2025	Hekiru Hikawa
6	"Can You Face Your True Feelings?"; Transliteration: "Hontō no Kimochi to Mukiaemasu ka?" (Japanese: 本当の気持ちと向き合えますか？)	Seimei Kidokoro	Masayoshi Nishida	November 16, 2025	Aoi Yūki
7	"I Was Stupid... So Stupid"; Transliteration: "Atashitte, Honto Baka" (Japanese: あたしって、ほんとバカ)	Takashi Kawabata	Shinichi Omata	November 23, 2025	Emiri Katō
8	"I'd Never Allow That to Happen"; Transliteration: "Sonna no, Atashi ga Yurusanai" (Japanese: そんなの、あたしが許さない)	Masahiro Mukai	Noriko Nanashima	November 30, 2025	Hajime Ueda
9	"I Won't Rely On Anyone Anymore"; Transliteration: "Mō Dare ni mo Tayoranai" (Japanese: もう誰にも頼らない)	Yuki Yase	Shinsaku Sasaki	December 7, 2025	Hanokage
10	"The Only Thing I Have Left to Guide Me"; Transliteration: "Saigo ni Nokotta Michishirube" (Japanese: 最後に残った道しるべ)	Kotono Watanabe	Tomohiko Itō	December 14, 2025	okama
11	"My Very Best Friend"; Transliteration: "Watashi no, Saikō no Tomodachi" (Japanese: わたしの、最高の友達)	Yukihiro Miyamoto	Shinsaku Sasaki	December 21, 2025	Ume Aoki

== Drama CDs ==
Drama CDs were included with the first; third; and fifth BD/DVD volumes of the Japanese release. A fourth drama CD was released at Comiket 82 in August 2012 alongside an advance film ticket set.

No.	Title	Original release date
1	"Memories of You"; Transliteration: "Memorīzu obu Yū" (Japanese: メモリーズオブユー)	April 27, 2011
An expanded look at the original timeline depicted in episode 10, where Homura and Madoka became friends. When Homura becomes troubled about her lack of talent, Madoka tries using some of her magic to help her out during physical education (PE), but it just causes her to go out of control. After Madoka and Mami save Homura from a witch, Madoka confesses to Homura that she became a magical girl in order to save the life of a cat named Amy who was hit by a car. As a storm hits the city and Homura learns the meaning of Walpurgisnacht, she follows Amy to where Madoka is.
2	"Sunny Day Life"; Transliteration: "Sanī Dei Raifu" (Japanese: サニーデイ ライフ)	June 22, 2011
In a more carefree universe, Madoka and Sayaka flunk their English tests and study for a makeup test at Mami's apartment alongside Homura and Kyōko. The girls soon set into action when they assume a ghost-like witch is about, only to find it to be the work of a cat. Afterwards, they all get together to have dinner at Mami's place.
3	"Farewell Story"; Transliteration: "Feaueru Sutōrī" (Japanese: フェアウェル・ストーリー)	August 24, 2011
A prequel to the main series. Kyōko, who is starting off as a magical girl, meets Mami for the first time during a battle with a witch. The two become partners, fighting witches together and learning special moves. After inviting Mami to eat with her family, Kyōko tells her about the wish she made. However, after learning of her family's death, Kyōko takes on a different outlook on fighting witches which leads to her falling out with Mami and deciding to leave town. This CD was later adapted into Volume 1 of Puella Magi Madoka Magica: The Different Story.
Special	"Summer Magical Girl Training Camp!!"; Transliteration: "Natsu no Mahō Shōjo Kyōka Gasshuku!!" (Japanese: 夏の魔法少女強化合宿！！)	August 10, 2012
The girls head to the beach together for a magical girl training camp. After Sayaka argues with Kyōko after she teases her a little, she ends up walking into a witch's labyrinth in the middle of the ocean but is rescued by the others. Afterwards, the girls spend the night at an inn where they have a bath and eat a meal together.

== Home video releases ==
In Japan, Aniplex distributed six BD/DVD (Blu-ray Disc/Digital Versatile Disc) volumes of Puella Magi Madoka Magica in 2011; all of which were included in a box set on December 25, 2013. In the United States and Canada, Aniplex of America published three BD/DVD volumes of the series in 2012; and compiled them into a box set on September 27, 2016.

Aniplex (Japan, Region A/2)
Release	Date	Episodes	Extras	Ref(s)
Volume 1	April 27, 2011	1–2	Drama CD – "Memories of You"; Character Single – "Mata Ashita" by Aoi Yūki	
Volume 2	May 25, 2011	3–4	Original Soundtrack Vol. 1	
Volume 3	June 22, 2011	5–6	Drama CD – "Sunny Day Life"	
Volume 4	July 27, 2011	7–8	Original Soundtrack Vol. 2	
Volume 5	August 24, 2011	9–10	Drama CD – "Farewell Story"; Character Single – "And I'm Home" by Eri Kitamura and Ai Nonaka	
Volume 6	September 21, 2011	11–12	Original Soundtrack Vol. 3	
Box Set	December 25, 2013	1–12	Package Illustrated by Takahiro Kishida (Character Design); Set of 3 postcards	

Aniplex of America (United States and Canada, Region A/1)
Release	Date	Episodes	Extras (limited edition ver.)	Ref(s)
Volume 1	February 14, 2012	1–4	Original Soundtrack Vol. 1 Mini-poster, Postcards	
Volume 2	April 10, 2012	5–8	Original Soundtrack Vol. 2 Double-side posters, Postcards	
Volume 3	June 12, 2012	9–12	Original Soundtrack Vol. 3 Double-side posters, Postcards	
Box Set	September 27, 2016	1–12	Package Illustrated by Takahiro Kishida (Character Design); 4-page Insert	
