= Puella Magi Madoka Magica: Magia Exedra =

Japanese video game

Madoka Magica Magia Exedra
- Developers: F4samurai; Pokelabo
- Publisher: Aniplex
- Directors: Toshiyuki Shimane (Pokelabo); Kenichirou Yamada (Pokelabo); Arisa Kosaka (f4samurai)
- Producer: Hidetoshi Kobori
- Series: Puella Magi Madoka Magica
- Engine: Unity
- Platforms: Android; iOS; Windows
- Release: Android, iOS: WW: 27 March 2025; Windows: WW: 17 July 2025
- Genre: Role-playing
- Mode: Single-player

Puella Magi Madoka Magica: Magia Exedra (Japanese: 魔法少女まどか☆マギカ Magia Exedra, Hepburn: Mahō Shōjo Madoka Magika Magia Ekusedora) is a Japanese free-to-play role-playing gacha video game developed by f4samurai and Pokelabo and published by Aniplex. It is the latest video game in the Puella Magi Madoka Magica series, featuring characters from the main anime and film series, its spin-off mangas, and the spin-off game Magia Record. The latter ended its service shortly after the game's announcement, with players able to transfer their account data from Record to Exedra.

== Gameplay ==
Puella Magi Madoka Magica: Magia Exedra is a role-playing video game. The player explores dungeons in the form of Witch Labyrinths, and can collect items and experience and battle enemies in a turn-based combat system. The gameplay has drawn comparisons to Honkai: Star Rail.

== Plot ==
The game features an unnamed main character, taking the role of a now-amnesiac former Magical Girl collecting memories from other Magical Girls with the assistance of a green Kyubey-like character named A-Q. Madoka Kaname (the main character of the original Puella Magi Madoka Magica anime) and Iroha Tamaki (the main character of the Magia Record spin-off) also appear in the game. Other characters previously featured in Magia Record, including Ren Isuzu, Sana Futaba, and Ashley Taylor, also return.

== Development and release ==
In April 2024, it was announced that there would be a new mobile game for the Puella Magi Madoka Magica series, titled Puella Magi Madoka Magica: Magia Exedra and developed by F4samurai (who also worked on Magia Record) and Pokelabo (developers of SINoALICE). A new teaser trailer for the game was released in June 2024. In November 2024, the release was delayed to 2025, with the developers citing a desire to improve the game's quality.

Magia Record, the series' previous free-to-play game, ended its service in Japan on July 31, 2024, after Magia Exedra was announced. Prior to this, it was announced that players of Magia Record would be able to transfer their accounts to Magia Exedra.

By January 2025, more than 500,000 users had pre-registered for the game, and by March 2025, that number had grown to 1 million. In March 2024, the game's launch date on iOS and Android was announced as March 27, 2025. An opening sequence video, animated by Shaft with assistance from Pine Jam, featuring the opening theme song "Lighthouse" (performed by FictionJunction featuring Lino Leia), was later released at AnimeJapan 2025.

A special pre-launch broadcast, Magia Exedra Tsushin #4: Pre-Release Special, was aired on March 24 at 8:00 PM JST, featuring Akari Komiyama and Ayana Taketatsu.

Pre-downloading started on March 25, and the early access release for Magia Exedra was available by March 26. The Windows version was released on July 17.

== Other media ==
A sequel manga to Magia Record's Magia Report, created by Papa, began publishing in September 2024, named Magia Et Cetera.
