= Kaori Mizuhashi =

Japanese voice actress (born 1974)

- 水橋 かおり
- Born: August 28, 1974 (age 52); Sapporo, Hokkaido, Japan
- Occupation: Voice actress
- Years active: 1996–present
- Agent: Arts Vision
- Height: 150 cm (4 ft 11 in)
- Website: miz84.com

Kaori Mizuhashi (水橋 かおり, Mizuhashi Kaori; born August 28, 1974) is a Japanese voice actress who is employed by Arts Vision. Her major voice roles include Meiru Sakurai in Megaman NT Warrior, Mami Tomoe in Puella Magi Madoka Magica, Kuki Shinobu in Genshin Impact, Lava and May in Arknights, Vivio Takamachi in Magical Girl Lyrical Nanoha ViVid, Laharl in Disgaea: Hour of Darkness, Minami Shimada in Baka and Test, Ōgi Oshino in Monogatari, and Miyako in Hidamari Sketch.

== Biography ==
Mizuhashi was born in Sapporo, Hokkaido. As a child, she liked reading books aloud, especially lines of dialogue. When her turn to read script at Japanese language class came, Mizuhashi felt strangely motivated. She debuted in 1996 with the game Legend of the Valkyrie. In October 2000, Mizuhashi landed her first regular anime role in Hiwou War Chronicles. In the 2001 NHK anime Kasumin, her recognition received a boost when she starred as the leading role Kasumi Haruno.

== Filmography ==
=== Anime television series ===
- Kasumin (2001–2003) – Kasumi Haruno
- Puella Magi Madoka Magica (2011) – Mami Tomoe, Tatsuya Kaname, Walpurgisnacht, Walpurgisnacht's minions
- Love, Elections & Chocolate (2012) – Mifuyu Kiba
- Monogatari Series Second Season – Ougi OshinoTakamachi
- Circlet Princess (2020) – Ayumu Aizawa
- Gekidol (2021) – Tomoko Hinata
- Aru Asa Dummy Head Mike ni Natteita Ore-kun no Jinsei (2022) – Kaori Asakusa

=== Anime film ===
- Laid-Back Camp Movie – Saki Shima

=== Original video animation (OVA) ===
- Thus Spoke Kishibe Rohan – Ikkyū (ep. 3)
- Alice in Deadly School – Yonari Kaihara

=== Video games ===
1998

- The Legend of Zelda: Ocarina of Time - Navi

2021

- Blue Archive – Michiru Chidori
- Umamusume: Pretty Derby – Yayoi Akikawa

2022

- Genshin Impact – Kuki Shinobu
- A Certain Magical Index: Imaginary Fest – Aleister Crowley (young girl)
- Harmonia – Shiona

2024

- Touhou Spell Carnival – Aya Shameimaru

2026

- The Legend of Zelda: Ocarina of Time - Navi
