= List of Puella Magi Madoka Magica chapters =

Cover of the first tankōbon volume of the Puella Magi Madoka Magica manga series, released by Houbunsha on February 12, 2011, in Japan

The following is a list of manga publications published by Houbunsha based on the anime television series, Puella Magi Madoka Magica.

The series revolves around a schoolgirl named Madoka Kaname, as well as her friend Sayaka Miki, who are approached by a magical creature called Kyubey, who offers them to become magical girls in turn. The new student in their class, Homura Akemi, however, mysteriously seeks to prevent Madoka from making this contract.

== Puella Magi Madoka Magica ==
Puella Magi Madoka Magica (魔法少女まどか☆マギカ, Mahō Shōjo Madoka Magika) is a direct adaptation of the anime series illustrated by Hanokage. The story follows 14-year-old Madoka Kaname, as she discovers the world of magical girls and the dark secrets it holds. The series is published in three tankōbon volumes, released on February 12, 2011, March 12, 2011, and May 30, 2011, respectively. The series was released in North America by Yen Press in 2012.

No.	Original release date	Original ISBN	English release date	English ISBN
01	February 12, 2011	978-4-8322-7990-2	May 29, 2012	978-0-316-21387-5
1. "I Met Her in a Dream, I Think..." (夢の中で会った、ような..., "Yume no Naka de Atta, Yō na..."); 2. "How Happy It Would Make Me" (それはとっても嬉しいなって, "Sore wa Tottemo Ureshii natte"); 3. "I've Got Nothing To Be Afraid Of" (もう何も怖くない, "Mō Nani mo Kowakunai"); 4. "Miracles and Magic Both Exist" (奇跡も、魔法も、あるんだよ, "Kiseki mo, Mahō mo, Arun da yo")
After having a strange dream, middle schooler Madoka Kaname is surprised to find the girl from her dream, Homura Akemi, enroll into her school. Later that day, Madoka and her friend Sayaka Miki are approached by a magical girl named Mami Tomoe and a strange creature named Kyubey. Kyubey offers the two girls the chance to have any wish granted, but in return they must become magical girls and fight off demons known as witches. As Mami shows Madoka and Sayaka how she uses her powers to help others, Homura, who is also a magical girl, is against the idea of Madoka becoming one. Just as Madoka is about to consider becoming a magical girl, Mami is killed in battle against a witch, which devastates her and causes her to change her mind. Later though, when Madoka gets involved in a witch attack along with her classmate, Hitomi Shizuki, she is rescued by Sayaka, who becomes a magical girl after wishing to cure the hand of her childhood friend Kyosuke Kamijo, who she has a crush on.
02	March 12, 2011	978-4-8322-4003-2	August 21, 2012	978-0-316-21715-6
5. "Regrets? How Could I Regret This?" (後悔なんて、あるわけない, "Kōkai nante, Aru Wake Nai"); 6. "This Is Just Too Weird" (こんなの絶対おかしいよ, "Konna no Zettai Okashiiyo"); 7. "Can You Truly Face Your Feelings?" (本当の気持ちと向き合えますか？, "Hontō no Kimochi to Mukiaemasu ka?"); 8. "What An Idiot I Am" (あたしって、ほんとバカ, "Atashitte, Honto Baka")
As Sayaka begins her duties as a magical girl, she comes into a conflict with a veteran magical girl named Kyoko Sakura, who has different ideals from her. During one of these conflicts, Madoka attempts to stop Sayaka by throwing away her soul gem, the source of her magical power. However, this causes Sayaka to fall limp, as Kyubey reveals that soul gems literally contain a magical girl's soul, with their bodies becoming mere hardware. After Homura reunites her with her soul gem, Sayaka is approached by Kyoko, who tells her to try and live for herself, but she is ignored. When Hitomi reveals she plans to confess to Kyosuke, Sayaka starts to fall further into despair, rejecting help from everyone else. As Madoka considers using her wish to help Sayaka, Homura stops her, begging her not to throw her life away. It is revealed Homura comes from another timeline. Kyoko finds Sayaka only to witness her soul gem shatter under its accumulated darkness, transforming her into a witch.
03	May 30, 2011	978-4-8322-4014-8	December 11, 2012	978-0-316-21716-3
9. "They're the Ones I Just Can't Accept" (そんなの、あたしが許さない, "Sonna no, Atashi ga Yurusanai"); 10. "I Refuse to Rely on Anyone Anymore" (もう誰にも頼らない, "Mō Dare ni mo Tayoranai"); 11. "The Final Remaining Guidepost" (最後に残った道しるべ, "Saigo ni Nokotta Michishirube"); 12. "My Very Best Friend" (わたしの、最高の友達, "Watashi no, Saikō no Tomodachi")
Homura reveals to Madoka and Kyoko that Sayaka had become a witch as a result of her soul gem transforming into a grief seed. Kyubey, whose true identity is "Incubator", explains to Madoka that he raises magical girls to become witches in order to harvest energy needed to counter entropy in the universe. Still believing there may be a way to save Sayaka, Kyoko takes Madoka to try and reach her, but in the end she is forced to sacrifice herself to stop Sayaka. Homura's past is explained, in which she came from a different timeline and became a magical girl in order to go back in time and prevent Madoka's death at the hands of a powerful witch known as Walpurgisnacht. When she eventually learned the true nature of magical girl, she spent several time loops trying to prevent Madoka making a contract in the first place. Back in the present, Kyubey shows the history of the magical girl to Madoka. Madoka later sees Homura, who reveals her secret to her and decides to fight against Walpurgisnacht alone. With Homura outmatched, Madoka makes the decision to become a magical girl, wishing to prevent all the magical girls throughout history from turning into witches, becoming a god-like entity with no evidence of existing on Earth. As history is changed, Homura is the only one who remembers Madoka, and continues to fight against a new enemy in her memory.

=== Puella Magi Madoka Magica: The Different Story ===
Puella Magi Madoka Magica: The Different Story (魔法少女まどか☆マギカ ~The different story~) is another spin-off manga illustrated by Hanokage, which takes place on an alternate timeline to the main series. It was released in three tankōbon volumes between October 12, 2012, and November 12, 2012. Yen Press has licensed the volumes in North America.

No.	Original release date	Original ISBN	English release date	English ISBN
01	October 12, 2012	978-4-8322-4203-6	March 25, 2014	978-0-316-37051-6
A year into her life as a magical girl, Mami encounters Kyoko for the first time, helping her to defeat a witch. Awed by her skills, Kyoko asks to become Mami's apprentice and the two soon become partners in fighting against witches. One night, when she is forced to fight against a witch in her family's church, Kyoko is spotted by her father in her magical girl uniform. Realizing the miracle granted by Kyoko's wish was just an illusion, her father goes insane, killing the rest of his family and himself. As a result, Kyoko ends up losing her illusion magic and her attitude to fighting witches changes. Feeling their ideals no longer match, Kyoko decides to stop being Mami's partner and leaves Mitakihara. Some time later, Mami ends up encountering Kyoko once again when she is brought in to interrupt a fight between her and Sayaka, who had also become a magical girl.
02	October 19, 2012	978-4-8322-4208-1	June 23, 2014	978-0-316-37052-3
As Mami becomes curious about why Kyoko has returned to Mitakihara, along with what Homura's motives are, she manages to save Hitomi from a witch thanks to Madoka's help. When Sayaka becomes distracted during a witch hunt, Mami gets injured whilst protecting her, although Homura and Kyoko arrive in time to give Sayaka the chance to heal her. After the battle, Mami meets up with Kyoko, who reprimands her for allowing Sayaka to make a contract. Feeling guilty about allowing Mami to get hurt, Sayaka decides to stop being her partner, revealing to her that she didn't attempt to save Hitomi herself after she revealed she was going to confess to Kyosuke. Noticing Sayaka sink into depression, Madoka reveals to Kyosuke that Sayaka was the one who healed his injured hand. As Sayaka becomes conflicted by Kyosuke knowing the truth about her and runs away, Mami confesses her own insecurities to her to get her to change her mind. While Sayaka is grateful to Mami for making her feel useful, her hope comes too late; after the fight, her magic becomes exhausted and she transforms into a witch. Kyubey explains that it was because there weren't enough grief seeds to spread out among the magical girls.
03	November 12, 2012	978-4-8322-4220-3	June 23, 2015	978-0-316-38901-3
As Mami learns about how magical girls inevitably become witches, she resolves to kill herself alongside Sayaka. Kyoko stands in her way and the two fight again, with Kyoko managing to survive thanks to the reawakening of her illusion magic. As Mami feels weakened from overusing her magic, Kyoko tells her that she always thought of her as family and purifies her soul gem with a grief seed she had before going on to defeat Sayaka's witch. After Mami recovers from her injuries, Homura approaches her about assisting her in facing Walpurgisnacht before Kyubey reveals Kyoko had died after exhausting her magical energy. As Mami starts to despair, Homura slaps some sense into her, telling her to accept her limits and live on. After Homura leaves, Madoka tells Mami about how she had secretly been friends with Kyoko and learnt a lot about Mami, before deciding to become a magical girl in Mami's stead. In the end, Madoka makes a contract to bring Sayaka back to life whilst Mami chooses to destroy her own soul gem, leaving behind a message for the others who go on to fight against Walpurgisnacht.

=== Puella Magi Madoka Magica: Homura's Revenge! ===
Puella Magi Madoka Magica: Homura's Revenge! (魔法少女まどか☆マギカ ほむらリベンジ!, Mahō Shōjo Madoka☆Magika: Homura Ribenji!), written and illustrated by Golden Pe Done, began serialization in the first issue of Manga Time Kirara Magica released on June 8, 2012.

No.	Original release date	Original ISBN	English release date	English ISBN
01	September 12, 2013	978-4-8322-4349-1	July 21, 2015	978-0-316-34487-6
Just as Madoka decides to make her wish to become a magical girl, Homura gets ready to reset her timeline once more, but this time with a twist: she takes Madoka with her. Waking up in the new timeline, Homura finds out that Madoka remembers everything about her and the previous timeline, and she is determined to save her friends from their terrible fates. However, Madoka isn't the only one that remembers, as Kyubey tagged along on the ride back as well, and he is determined to have Madoka make a contract with him. Madoka plays along with Mami teaching her how to be a magical girl once more, this time hoping to save Mami from her death at the hands of Charlotte. Homura intends to win Mami's trust in order to help her, but Kyubey puts a quick stop to that by turning Mami against Homura before they even meet. This distrust leads to Mami keeping Homura out of the fight with Charlotte, but Madoka is prepared. Madoka saves Mami at the last second, and encourages Mami not to let her guard down. Kyubey releases Homura from Mami's binding, encouraging her to help save Mami. However, Homura's entrance on the scene distracts Mami, causing her to die anyway. Sayaka's hatred for Homura grows, as she is convinced that Mami's death was Homura's fault. Sayaka makes her wish to become a magical girl, intending to avenge Mami as well. Kyubey encourages her, intending to corrupt Homura's soul gem in order to force Madoka to make a contract. Homura attempts to befriend Sayaka, but Kyubey instead introduces Sayaka to Kyoko, encouraging them to team up against Homura. When the time comes where Sayaka would normally fight Kyoko, Kyoko attacks Homura instead, only for Sayaka to intervene and reveal their alliance, attacking Homura as well.
02	December 12, 2013	978-4-8322-4381-1	October 27, 2015	978-0-316-34897-3
Even with Madoka's help, Homura has failed to rescue Mami from her fate – worse, she may actually have brought it about it. With both Sayaka and Kyoko looking to have their revenge for her part in Mami's death, Homura has to concern herself with her own survival – on top of trying to save her friends! Can anything derail the tragic fate that awaits them all?

=== Puella Magi Madoka Magica the Movie: Rebellion ===
Puella Magi Madoka Magica the Movie: Rebellion (劇場版 魔法少女まどか☆マギカ [新編]叛逆の物語, Gekijōban Mahō Shōjo Madoka Magika (Shinpen): Hangyaku no Monogatari) is an adaptation of the theatrical film of the same name, once again illustrated by Hanokage. The series was released in three tankobon volumes between November 12, 2013, and January 10, 2014. Yen Press licensed the series to be released as a single hardback volume in June 2015, however, this release was cancelled and the manga was instead released as three paperback tankobon volumes.

No.	Original release date	Original ISBN	English release date	English ISBN
01	November 12, 2013	978-4-8322-4369-9	December 15, 2015	978-0-316-30938-7
In the seemingly carefree city of Mitakihara, Homura transfers into school and joins Madoka, Sayaka, Mami, and Kyoko, along with a familiar named Bebe, as they become magical girls and fight against creatures known as Nightmares that are formed from bad dreams. Together, they help stop a Nightmare created by Hitomi when her frustrations over not being able to see Kyosuke reach their peak. Over time, however, Homura starts to feel there is something amiss. Curious about the vagueness concerning some people's memories, Homura asks Kyoko to take her to her home town of Kazamino. When they try to take the bus there, they soon discover they are actually unable to leave Mitakihara. Homura urges Kyoko to keep what she discovered a secret, so as to not attract unwanted attention, whilst she herself recalls some of her true memories, realising this fake Mitakihara has to be the work of a witch, and sets off to find whoever created it.
02	December 12, 2013	978-4-8322-4380-4	January 26, 2016	978-0-316-30939-4
Remembering Bebe as a witch from previous timelines she had experienced, Homura tries to interrogate her about whether the witch's barrier is her doing. However, she is followed by Mami, who engages in battle with her in order to protect Bebe. Although Mami doesn't believe Homura's words that Bebe is a witch, she does remember that the enemy she fights is different from the Nightmares, before Homura escapes with assistance from Sayaka. Whilst Bebe appears before Mami as a magical girl named Nagisa Momoe, Sayaka, who possesses all her memories, explains a little about her role in this world, cautioning Homura about pursuing the truth further before leaving. As Homura goes over the contradictions in her head, she encounters Madoka, who helps her realise some things about herself. After confirming some things with Kyoko, Homura comes to the conclusion that, since she is the only one who knows of both witches and Madoka, the only one who could've made the witch barrier is herself. This is revealed to be the work of Kyubey, who had placed a barrier around Homura's soul gem to prevent Madoka from taking her to the Law of Cycles, resulting in a witches barrier being created inside the soul gem, which Homura unconsciously grabbed several people, including Madoka, inside of. In order to stop Kyubey from trapping Madoka and taking her power so that his race can bring back witches into the world, Homura willingly lets herself become a witch.
03	January 10, 2014	978-4-8322-4394-1	February 23, 2016	978-0-316-30940-0
Led by Sayaka and Nagisa, revealed to be the guardians of the Law of Cycles sent to restore Madoka's memories, lead Madoka, Mami, and Kyoko on a charge to rescue Homura, eventually uncovering the seal Kyubey had placed on her. Finally reaching Homura, Madoka manages to bring her back to normal and together they destroy the illusionary world and return to the real world. There, the true Madoka, along with Sayaka and Bebe, come to cleanse Homura and bring her into the Law of Cycles. However, just as Madoka reaches her, Homura grabs Madoka and tears her apart from her godly powers, using the power of her love to become a "demon" and rewrite the universe. Forcing Kyubey's cooperation, Homura creates a new world in which Madoka, Sayaka, and Nagisa are human again, rewriting their memories. Homura revels in this new world, whilst simultaneously fearing the day when Madoka will regain her godly powers and stand against her.

=== Puella Magi Madoka Magica: Wraith Arc ===
Puella Magi Madoka Magica: Wraith Arc (魔法少女まどか☆マギカ［魔獣編］), written and illustrated by Hanokage, began serialization in the 20th issue of Manga Time Kirara Magica released on June 10, 2015. The plot depicts the events that happened between Puella Magi Madoka Magica the Movie: Eternal and Puella Magi Madoka Magica the Movie: Rebellion.

No.	Title	Original release date	English release date
1	Puella Magi Madoka Magica: Wraith Arc, Vol. 1 魔法少女まどか☆マギカ[魔獣編] (1)	December 12, 2015; 978-4-8322-4640-9	November 16, 2021; 978-1-9753-3593-9
2	Puella Magi Madoka Magica: Wraith Arc, Vol. 2 魔法少女まどか☆マギカ[魔獣編] (2)	June 11, 2016; 978-4-8322-4705-5	February 22, 2022; 978-1-9753-3595-3
3	Puella Magi Madoka Magica: Wraith Arc, Vol. 3 魔法少女まどか☆マギカ[魔獣編] (3)	December 12, 2016; 978-4-8322-4779-6	June 21, 2022; 978-1-9753-3597-7

== Puella Magi Kazumi Magica: The Innocent Malice ==
Puella Magi Kazumi Magica: The Innocent Malice (魔法少女かずみ☆マギカ〜The innocent malice〜, Mahō Shōjo Kazumi Magika: The Innocent Malice) is a side-story with little connection to the main series, written by Masaki Hiramatsu and illustrated by Takashi Tensugi. It focuses on an amnesiac magical girl named Kazumi who, along with her friends, the Pleiades Saints, learns of the dark secrets as she regains her memory. The series was serialized in Manga Time Kirara Forward between January 24, 2011, and November 24, 2012, with the first tankōbon volume released on May 12, 2011. Yen Press has licensed the series in North America.

No.	Original release date	Original ISBN	English release date	English ISBN
01	May 12, 2011	978-4-8322-4016-2	June 25, 2013	978-0-316-25096-2
1. "Spotabaddynoff" (アクトウワカルガノフ, "Akutouwakaruganofu"); 2. "Pop Dogs" (ポットデルドッグ, "Potto Deru Doggu"); 3. "Kazumix" (カズミックス, "Kazumikkusu")
A girl named Kazumi emerges from a briefcase with no memory besides her name. After stopping a bomb from exploding and reuniting with her friends, Umika and Kaoru, Kazumi is attacked by a possessed police officer, but she soon recalls her abilities as a magical girl and manages to stop it. The next day, Kazumi, along with Umika and Kaoru, who are also magical girls, battle against a cosmetics saleswoman who gets possessed by a witch. When Umika and Kaoru are captured by another witch, Kazumi reunites with her other friends, collectively known as the Pleiades Saints, to search for them. Along the way, they encounter another magical girl who attempts to kill Kazumi, but she is rescued by the others, who together locate Umika and Kaoru and defeat the witch.
02	October 12, 2011	978-4-8322-4071-1	August 20, 2013	978-0-316-25425-0
4. "Evil Nuts" (イーブルナッツ, Iiburu Nattsu); 5. "Magica Arrabbiata" (マギカアラビアータ, Magika Arabiāta); 6. "Bucket Parfait" (ボケツパフェ, Bokutsu Pafe); 7. "Picking Gems" (ピックジェムズ, Pikku Jemuzu); 8. "Fried Ice Cream" (テンプラアイス, Tenpura Aisu)
As the group learn that some of the grief seeds they have been collecting are actually strange objects called evil nuts, Kazumi is kidnapped by a magical girl named Yuuri. It is revealed that Yuuri is actually a girl named Airi, saved from a terminal illness by her friend Yuuri Asuka who became a magical girl in order to cure her; however, Yuuri later transformed into a witch which the Pleiades Saints were forced to kill. Devastated upon learning the truth, Airi made a contract with Kyubey to take Yuuri's form and became a magical girl so she could seek revenge on the Pleiades Saints. Airi manages to insert one of her evil nuts into Kazumi, but soon transforms into a witch herself. Although Kazumi attempts to change Airi back to normal, she soon realizes that is not possible and accepts the burden of having to kill her. Subsequently, Kazumi and Nico come up against the witch duo of Ayase and Ruka Souju, who are picking soul gems from magical girls' bodies.
03	March 12, 2012	978-4-8322-4122-0	November 19, 2013	978-0-316-25426-7
9. "Freezer" (レイトウコ, Reitouko); 10. "Chi-Chin Purin" (チチンプリン, Chichin Purin); 11. "Dead or Rice" (デッド オア ライフ, Deddo oa Raifu); 12. "Pleiades" (プレイアデス, Pureiadesu); 13. "Malefica Farce" (マレフｨカフｧルス, Marefika Farusu)
With Kazumi having learned the truth about how witches are created, the rest of the Pleiades Saints take her to a place called the Freezer where they store the bodies of magical girls who have lost their connections to their soul gems, hoping to find a way to restore the girls' lives. Umika returns Kazumi's memories to her, which reveals the other girls' pasts and how Kazumi met them. Afterwards, Satomi catches Saki alone and uses her magic to place Saki under mind control, and sends her to Umika's house to kill Kazumi. Unwilling to kill Kazumi even while brainwashed, Saki instead brings Kazumi to a rooftop and leaves her alone with Satomi. Satomi then reveals to Kazumi that there was something missing from the memories Umika gave to her: Kazumi is actually the thirteenth clone of a dead magical girl named Kazusa Michiru, who was the founder and leader of the Pleiades before she turned into a witch and died. The Pleiades have since been cloning her using the flesh of dead witches in an attempt to revive her; however, Kazumi's earlier exposure to the evil nut is causing her to revert to a witch-like form. Deciding to kill Kazumi before she can become a witch, Satomi reveals the twelve other failed clones and prepares to set them on Kazumi.
04	September 12, 2012	978-4-8322-4193-0	February 18, 2014	978-0-316-25427-4
14. "Cannibalism" (トモグイ, Tomogui); 15. "Essence of Satomi" (サトミノモト, Satomi no Moto); 16. "Strawberry Risotto" (イチゴリゾット, Ichigo Rizotto); 17. "Secret Ingredient" (カクシアジ, Kakushiaji); 18. "Connect" (コネクト, Konekuto)
05	January 12, 2013	978-4-8322-4247-0	May 27, 2014	978-0-316-28677-0
19. "Grief Seed" (グリーフシード, Gurīfu Shīdo); 20. "Incubator" (インキュベーター, Inkyubētā); 21. "Juubey" (ジューベー, Jūbē); 22. "Kazumi Magica (かずみ☆マギカ, Kazumi Magika); 23. "Innocent Malice" (イノセントマリス, Inosento Marisu)

== Puella Magi Oriko Magica ==
Puella Magi Oriko Magica (魔法少女おりこ☆マギカ, Mahō Shōjo Oriko Magika) is a spin-off from the main series, written by Kuroe Mura. Taking place in an alternate timeline from the anime series, the story follows the magical girls as they investigate a case of magical girl hunting. The series was released in two tankōbon volumes on May 12, 2011, and June 12, 2011, respectively. Yen Press has licensed the two Oriko volumes and Extra Story in North America.

No.	Original release date	Original ISBN	English release date	English ISBN
01	May 12, 2011	978-4-8322-4016-2	July 23, 2013	978-0-316-25428-1
1. "Don't Even Think About Becoming a Magical Girl" (魔法少女になろうなんて考えるな, Mahō Shōjo ni Narō nante Kangaeru na); 2. "I'm Not Even Close to Crying!" (泣いてなんかないよ, Naite nanka Nai yo); 3. "Love is an Infinity Of Limitations" (愛は無限に有限なんだ, Ai wa Mugen ni Yūgen Nanda)
A newly christened magical girl named Oriko Mikuni sees a horrifying vision of the future and decides to make a suggestion to Kyubey for a magical girl candidate. Meanwhile, Kyoko encounters a young girl named Yuma Chitose, whose parents were just killed by a witch, and decides to take her under her wing. Kyoko soon learns from Kyubey, who offers a contract to Yuma which Kyoko objects to, that a magical girl is killing her own kind. As Kyoko battles against a powerful witch one night, Oriko appears before Yuma, telling her that Kyoko will be killed. To this end, Yuma becomes a magical girl in order to save Kyoko's life, despite her warning her not to become one. Meanwhile, Mami is investigating the magical girl killings when she encounters a girl named Kirika Kure, who is revealed to be killing magical girls as per Oriko's requests. The two engage in battle, with Kirika getting the upper hand.
02	June 13, 2011	978-4-8322-4036-0	October 29, 2013	978-0-316-25429-8
4. "I Do Not Forgive You" (絶対に許さない, Zettai ni Yurusanai); 5. "That Is Why I Am Here" (そのために私はここにいる, Sono Tame ni Watashi wa Kokoni Iru); 6. "Someday Is Not Now" (いつかはいまじゃないよ, Itsuka wa Ima janai yo); 7. "To Protect My World" (私の世界を守るため, Watashi no Sekai o Mamoru Tame)
Mami manages to defeat Kirika by turning her magical ability to slow down time against her. However, Oriko appears and retrieves Kirika before Mami can make the final blow. Later on, Oriko and Kirika attack Mitakihara Middle School, trapping all the students inside a witch's barrier, leaving them at the mercy of the familiars. After putting Madoka in a protective barrier, Homura confronts Kirika and Oriko, who reveals she wants to kill Madoka to prevent her becoming a powerful witch that will end the world. As Mami, Kyoko and Yuma join the battle, Kirika becomes a witch which causes them to hesitate in their fighting, whilst Oriko taunts Homura about her constant time looping. However, Yuma manages to encourage Kyoko and Mami to keep going and fight back, working together to defeat Kirika. Oriko makes a last stand but is ultimately killed by Homura. However, in her last breath she manages to kill Madoka, forcing Homura to go through another time loop.

=== Puella Magi Oriko Magica: Extra Story ===
Two side-story arcs, titled Noisy Citrine and Symmetry Diamond, focusing on Kirika Kure and Oriko Mikuni respectively, have been published in Houbunsha's Manga Time Kirara Magica magazine. They were then collected in a volume titled Puella Magi Oriko Magica: Extra Story (魔法少女おりこ☆マギカ［別編］, Mahō Shōjo Oriko Magika [Beppen]) along with a new short story, The Last Agate.

No.	Original release date	Original ISBN	English release date	English ISBN
-	September 12, 2013	978-4-8322-4348-4	March 24, 2015	978-0-316-38310-3
1. ~noisy citrine~ [part 1]; 2. ~noisy citrine~ [part 2]; 3. ~symmetry diamond~ [part 1]; 4. ~symmetry diamond~ [part 2]; 5. ~symmetry diamond~ [part 3]; 6. ~the last agate~
Extra Story features three new side-stories, Noisy Citrine, Symmetry Diamond, and The Last Agate. Noisy Citrine explains Kirika's backstory and character and how she became the person she is today. Symmetry Diamond is an alternate timeline featuring more heroic versions of Oriko and Kirika as they strive to defeat Walpurgisnacht instead of Kriemhild Gretchen; Yuma and her abusive home-life and the consequences of her not becoming a magical girl, good or bad; and the appearance of a new magical girl with mind-control abilities, Sasa Yuuki, who wishes to claim Mitakihara City as her new territory. The Last Agate is a short that serves as a continuation of Symmetry Diamond, featuring Walpurgisnacht's arrival.

=== Puella Magi Oriko Magica: Sadness Prayer ===
A prequel to the first Oriko Magica installment, Puella Magi Oriko Magica: Sadness Prayer (［新約］魔法少女おりこ☆マギカ〜sadness prayer〜, [Shinyaku] Mahō Shōjo Oriko Magika ~sadness prayer~; lit. '[New Edition] Puella Magi Oriko Magica: Sadness Prayer'), is also being published in Kirara Magica. The first collected volume was released in Japan on February 12, 2015. Sadness Prayer explores the events that happen prior to Oriko Magica, but after the prologue where Oriko becomes a magical girl. The story is split into two distinct parts: the first exploring Oriko's new friend Komaki Asako, another magical girl; how Oriko met Kirika; Oriko's family; Komaki's friends, and her death by Kirika's hands. The second part features the reappearance of Sasa Yuuki and the introduction of many more magical girls.

No.	Original release date	Original ISBN	English release date	English ISBN
01	February 12, 2015	978-4-8322-4528-0	November 22, 2016	978-0-316-55257-8
02	December 12, 2015	978-4-8322-4643-0	February 21, 2017	978-0-316-43366-2
03	December 12, 2016	978-4-8322-4780-2	October 31, 2017	978-0-316-43980-0
04	October 10, 2017	978-4-8322-4862-5	September 18, 2018	978-1-9753-5324-7

== Puella Magi Homura Tamura: Parallel Worlds Do Not Remain Parallel Forever ==
A slice of life four-panel spin-off series, Puella Magi Homura Tamura (魔法少女ほむら☆たむら), written and illustrated by Afro, is serialized in Manga Time Kirara Magica and released its first volume in October 2013. The manga follows the main characters of the anime in the role of "normal high school girls", and is licensed internationally by Yen Press.

No.	Original release date	Original ISBN	English release date	English ISBN
01	October 26, 2013	978-4-8322-4364-4	August 18, 2015	978-0-316-34488-3
02	May 27, 2015	978-4-8322-4573-0	February 23, 2016	978-0-316-26902-5
03	November 26, 2016	978-4-8322-4770-3	September 19, 2017	978-0-316-43982-4

== Puella Magi Suzune Magica ==
Puella Magi Suzune Magica (魔法少女すずね☆マギカ, Mahō Shōjo Suzune Magika) is a spin-off written and illustrated by GAN. The story follows a "magical girl killer" named Suzune Amano who comes face to face with a group of magical girls seeking to know why. The first four chapters were released in the first tankobon volume on November 12, 2013, before the series continued in Manga Time Kirara Forward from November 22, 2013, to November 22, 2014.

No.	Original release date	Original ISBN	English release date	English ISBN
01	November 12, 2013	978-4-8322-4370-5	September 25, 2015	978-0-316-34885-0
1. "Two sides" (表裏, Hyōri); 2. "Encounter" (邂逅, Kaigō); 3. "Doubt" (迷い, Mayoi); 4. "Remorse" (自責, Jiseki)
Suzune Amano is a magical girl who, by day, is a cheerful, smiling student at Akanegasaki Middle School who also delivers newspapers as a part-time job. By night, however, she is a killer who murders magical girls after asking for their names. Hearing rumors about the killings and how all the victims are teenage girls, a group of magical girls – Arisa Narumi, Haruka Kanade, Chisato Shion, and Matsuri Hinata, the latter of whom is Suzune's classmate – investigate the city at night in search of clues. Chisato encounters Suzune that night and is killed by her, leaving Arisa in shock. After Suzune refuses to say why she kills magical girls, stating they are better off not knowing, Haruka and Matsuri retreat with Arisa, hearing from Kyubey about how Suzune is their natural enemy. The next day, Arisa recounts her past and how she met Chisato, and both Haruka and Matsuri attempt to talk with Suzune, but Suzune once again refuses to say anything. The day after, Haruka encounters a witch, which starts probing her memories concerning her feelings of hatred towards her sister. Meanwhile, Arisa and Matsuri encounter Suzune, who is planning on confronting Haruka, and engage in battle with her.
02	June 12, 2014	978-4-8322-4451-1	December 15, 2015	978-0-316-38891-7
5. "Regret" (悔恨, Kaikon); 6. "Transformation" (変貌, Henbō); 7. "Truth" (真実, Shinjitsu); 8. "Price" (代償, Daishō); 9. "Hint" (気配, Kehai); 10. "Resolution" (覚悟, Kakugo)
As Arisa and Matsuri battle with Suzune, Haruka escapes and defeats the witch tormenting her with her memories. Despite Suzune's efforts to kill her and Arisa's and Matsuri's attempts to reach her, Haruka becomes a witch, revealing the dark secret of magical girls to Arisa and Matsuri. After Suzune defeats Haruka's witch, Kyubey appears to explain the magical girl system. After Suzune's departure, Kyubey shows Matsuri and Arisa visions of Suzune's past, where she was mentored by a woman named Tsubaki Mikoto, who became a witch, and thus Suzune inherited her pendant and began her hunt for magical girls. The next day, Arisa is seen truanting school, where she visits Chisato's home, meeting and running away from her father, thus recounting the event where Chisato told Arisa her wish; upon arriving home, Arisa breaks down, regretting the fact that she became a magical girl. The next day, Matsuri tries reaching out to Arisa, explaining that she used to be blind and made a wish to see, and that she doesn't regret her wish. Arisa, however, announces her intent to kill Suzune and departs, leaving Matsuri behind. That night, Arisa confronts Suzune in a dark alley, and they begin to fight. Meanwhile, while Matsuri debates on what to do, she is struck by sudden visions of memories she once lost, before being approached by a mysterious girl in a magical girl outfit, who greets Matsuri.
03	December 12, 2014	978-4-8322-4502-0	May 24, 2016	978-0-316-27061-8
11. "Darkness" (黒暗, Kokuan; lit. 'Black dark'); 12. "Reunion" (再会, Saikai); 13. "Recollection" (記憶, Kioku); 14. "Breakdown" (決裂, Ketsuretsu); 15. "Separation" (隔絶, Kakuzetsu); 16. "Convergence" (収斂, Shuren)
A mysterious magical girl by the name of Kagari Hinata approaches Matsuri. Matsuri questions her intentions and realizes that she is after Suzune. When Matsuri attempts to leave to intervene in Arisa and Suzune's battle, Kagari knocks her out and intervenes in the fight herself, killing Arisa to get her out of the way. Kagari shows Suzune visions of her past, where Matsuri and Kagari were taken care of by Tsubaki, how the twins went looking for Tsubaki after she disappeared, and how Kagari, upon seeing Suzune with Tsubaki's pendant and learning of Tsubaki's death through Kyubey, became a magical girl to exact revenge on Suzune, taking away Matsuri's memories of how she met and became friends with Suzune, and altering Suzune's to make her believe Tsubaki's death drove her to hunt down magical girls. In the present, Kagari beats down Suzune both physically and mentally before preparing to kill her, but Matsuri intervenes, saving Suzune and confronting Kagari on her reasons for revenge. Kagari attempts to kill Matsuri as well, but is defeated by a combination of teamwork by Suzune and Matsuri. Kagari then pulls her last resort card, turning herself into a witch. Suzune defeats Kagari's witch and saves Matsuri, before preparing to leave Yunagi City. Matsuri, upon awakening, follows Suzune, who tells Matsuri to forget about her and live on. Matsuri swears she'll never forget Suzune, Tsubaki, Kagari, and Arisa and her friends, and Suzune thanks her, before committing suicide by destroying her own soul gem. Matsuri is later seen on the roof of the school, tying Tsubaki's pendant into her hair, as she heads out with Kyubey to hunt witches.

== Puella Magi Tart Magica: The Legend of Jeanne d'Arc ==
Puella Magi Tart Magica: The Legend of Jeanne d'Arc, (魔法少女たると☆マギカ The Legend of "Jeanne d' Arc", Mahō Shōjo Taruto Magika The Legend of "Jeanne d' Arc") is a spin-off manga illustrated by Masugitsune/Kawazu-ku and serialized in Manga Time Kirara Forward. It is set in the 15th century and focuses on Joan of Arc who is revered as a hero of the Hundred Years' War and a saint of the Catholic Church. The first tankōbon volume was published by Houbunsha in June 2014. Yen Press has licensed the volumes in North America.

No.	Original release date	Original ISBN	English release date	English ISBN
01	June 12, 2014	978-4-8322-4452-8	April 21, 2015	978-0-316-38314-1
02	February 12, 2015	978-4-8322-4452-8	November 17, 2015	978-0-316-34896-6
03	December 12, 2015	978-4-8322-4642-3	July 19, 2016	978-0-316-27624-5
04	May 12, 2016	978-4-8322-4642-3	September 19, 2017	978-0-316-56020-7
05	April 12, 2017	978-4-8322-4823-6	November 14, 2017	978-0-316-41282-7

== Magia Record ==
The Magia Record manga are based on the video game of the same name. The first series consists of short comedic promotional comics posted on the Magia Record website that were later released in physical volumes. The manga, Magia Report (マギア☆レポート, Magia Repōto), is illustrated by PAPA and explains aspects of the game. Another series, Magia Record: Puella Magi Madoka Magica Side Story (マギアレコード 魔法少女まどか☆マギカ外伝, Magia Record: Mahō Shōjo Madoka Magica Gaiden), began serialization in Manga Time Kirara Forward in August 2018. It is illustrated by Fujino Fuji. Also published in Manga Time Kirara Forward is an anthology series authored by several different artists. In May 2019, Magia Record: Puella Magi Madoka Magica Side Story – Another Story (マギアレコード 魔法少女まどか☆マギカ外伝 アナザーストーリー, Magia Record: Mahō Shōjo Madoka Magica Gaiden Anazā Sutōrī), illustrated by U35, began serialization in Comic Fuz. Both the first Side Story series and Another Story are licensed in English by Yen Press.

=== Magia Report ===
No.	Japanese release date	Japanese ISBN
1	March 22, 2019	978-4-8322-7078-7
2	April 19, 2019	978-4-8322-7083-1
3	April 3, 2020	978-4-8322-7183-8
4	April 5, 2021	978-4-8322-7268-2

=== Side Story ===
No.	Original release date	Original ISBN	English release date	English ISBN
1	March 22, 2019	978-4-8322-7077-0	December 31, 2019	978-1-9753-8757-0
Cover characters: Iroha Tamaki and Madoka Kaname
2	January 4, 2020	978-4-8322-7147-0	August 18, 2020	978-1-9753-1540-5
Cover characters: Yachiyo Nanami and Homura Akemi
3	February 4, 2020	978-4-8322-7160-9	September 28, 2021	978-1-9753-3599-1
Cover characters: Tsuruno Yui and Iroha Tamaki
4	June 11, 2021	978-4-8322-7280-4	May 31, 2022	978-1-9753-4007-0
Cover characters: Felicia Mitsuki and Kyoko Sakura
5	December 10, 2021	978-4-8322-7330-6	November 22, 2022	978-1-9753-4985-1
Cover characters: Sana Futaba and the Uwasa of the Anonymous AI
6	August 10, 2022	978-4-8322-7385-6	October 17, 2023	978-1-9753-7397-9
Cover characters: Mifuyu Azusa and Yachiyo Nanami
7	March 10, 2023	978-4-8322-7443-3	March 19, 2024	978-1-9753-7903-2
Cover characters: Iroha Tamaki and Yachiyo Nanami
8	October 12, 2023	978-4-8322-7492-1	September 22, 2026	978-1-9753-9402-8
Cover character: Kanagi Izumi
9	June 11, 2024	978-4-8322-9555-1	—	—
Cover character: Uwasa Tsuruno and the Uwasa of the Chelation Land Mascot
10	October 10, 2024	978-4-8322-9577-3	—	—
Cover character: Holy Mami
11	May 12, 2025	978-4-8322-9634-3	—	—
12	December 11, 2025	978-4-8322-9680-0	—	—
13	August 10, 2026	978-4-8322-9741-8	—	—

=== Another Story ===
No.	Original release date	Original ISBN	English release date	English ISBN
1	March 4, 2020	978-4-8322-7173-9	August 30, 2022	978-1-9753-4364-4
2	June 11, 2021	978-4-8322-7281-1	January 17, 2023	978-1-9753-4987-5

=== Anthology ===
No.	Japanese release date	Japanese ISBN
1	April 19, 2019	978-4-8322-7084-8

== Other works ==
In 2011 and 2012, Houbunsha began publishing two anthology series, which featured various authors' interpretations of the Madoka Magica franchise. In June 2012, Houbunsha launched the magazine Manga Time Kirara Magica, dedicated to the Madoka Magica franchise. It published several series which expanded upon the series' universe, or reimagined the characters in different scenarios. In February 2017, the magazine switched from a bimonthly to irregular publication schedule, and all series ended, with the exception of Tomoe Mami no Heibon na Nichijō, which transferred to Manga Time Kirara Forward.

Title	Author	First volume release date	Volumes
Puella Magi Madoka Magica Anthology Comic (魔法少女まどか☆マギカ アンソロジーコミック, Mahō Shōjo Madoka Magika Ansorojī Komikku)	Various	September 12, 2011	5
Puella Magi Madoka Magica 4koma Anthology Comic (魔法少女まどか☆マギカ 4コマアンソロジーコミック, Mahō Shōjo Madoka Magika 4koma Ansorojī Komikku)	Various	July 26, 2012	4
Madoka Engawa (まどか☆えんがわ)	PAPA	September 27, 2013	3
Sutema! (すてマ！)	Ishito Yamada	September 27, 2013	3
Mitakihara Anti-Materials (見滝原☆アンチマテリアルズ, Mitakihara Anchimateriaruzu)	Myama	October 12, 2013	2
Tomoe Mami no Heibon na Nichijou (巴マミの平凡な日常)	Mai Arata	October 12, 2013	9
Welcome to Cafe Grief Seed! (カフェ☆グリーフシードへようこそ!, Kafe Gurīfushīdo e Youkoso!)	Kotori Hina	October 26, 2013	1
Mitakihara Kindergarten Mahou-Gumi (みたきはら幼稚園まほう組, Mitakihara Tōchien Mahōgumi)	linco	November 27, 2013	3
Pom Magi (ぽむ☆マギ, Pomu Magi)	Tsukumo	November 27, 2013	3
Puella Magi Club Madoka Magica (魔法少女部まどか☆マギカ, Mahō Shōjobu Madoka Magika)	Hige	December 12, 2013	3
Fuwatto Madoka (ふわっとまどか)	Mei Aota	December 26, 2013	3
Kanameke (かなめけ)	Nash; Misachu	February 27, 2015	2
Akemi Homura wa Ashita kara Ganbaru! (暁美ほむらは明日から頑張る！)	Hayahiro Ushiro	April 27, 2017	1
Oideyo! Magika-dō Shoten (おいでよ！マギカ堂書店)	Den Terayama	July 27, 2017	1
