= Puella Magi Madoka Magica =

Japanese anime television series and its franchise

- Volume 1 Blu-ray cover, featuring the two protagonists, Madoka Kaname (right) and Homura Akemi (left)

魔法少女まどか☆マギカ (Mahō Shōjo Madoka Magika)
- Genre: Dark fantasy; Magical girl; Psychological thriller
- Created by: Magica Quartet
- Anime television series
- Directed by: Akiyuki Shinbo (director); Yukihiro Miyamoto (series director)
- Produced by: Atsuhiro Iwakami (Aniplex); Yoshinao Doi (Nitroplus); Osamu Hosokawa (Hakuhodo DY); Kozue Kaneniwa (Movic); Ikuo Katō (Houbunsha); Hiroo Maruyama (MBS)
- Written by: Gen Urobuchi (Note: Parts of the screenplay related to the witches and labyrinths were revised by Doroinu and 2shiroinu, the members of Gekidan Inu Curry, without credit.)
- Music by: Yuki Kajiura
- Studio: Shaft
- Licensed by: Crunchyroll (Note: In the United Kingdom through Crunchyroll UK and Ireland (formerly known as Manga Entertainment) and in Australia through Madman Anime); NA: Aniplex of America
- Original network: JNN (MBS, TBS, CBC)
- English network: AU: ABC Me; NA: Neon Alley
- Original run: January 7, 2011 – April 22, 2011
- Episodes: 12
- Manga
- Puella Magi Madoka Magica; Puella Magi Kazumi Magica: The Innocent Malice; Puella Magi Oriko Magica; Puella Magi Madoka Magica: The Different Story; Puella Magi Madoka Magica: Homura's Revenge!; Puella Magi Oriko Magica: Extra Story; Puella Magi Homura Tamura; Puella Magi Madoka Magica the Movie: Rebellion; Puella Magi Suzune Magica; Puella Magi Tart Magica: The Legend of Jeanne d'Arc; Puella Magi Oriko Magica: Sadness Prayer; Puella Magi Madoka Magica: Wraith Arc
- Novel
- Written by: Hajime Ninomae
- Illustrated by: Yūpon
- Published by: Nitroplus Books
- Published: August 14, 2011
- Video game

Puella Magi Madoka Magica Portable
- Developer: Banpresto
- Publisher: Namco Bandai Games, Nitroplus
- Genre: Adventure game, RPG
- Platform: PlayStation Portable
- Released: March 15, 2012
- Video game

Puella Magi Madoka Magica: The Battle Pentagram
- Developer: Artdink
- Publisher: Namco Bandai Games
- Genre: Action game
- Platform: PlayStation Vita
- Released: December 19, 2013
- Video game

Puella Magi Madoka Magica: Magia Exedra
- Developer: Pokelabo, f4samurai
- Publisher: Aniplex
- Genre: Action role-playing
- Platform: Android, iOS, Windows
- Released: March 27, 2025
- Anime film series
- Puella Magi Madoka Magica: Beginnings and Eternal (2012); Puella Magi Madoka Magica: Rebellion (2013); Puella Magi Madoka Magica: Walpurgisnacht: Rising (2026)
- Other media
- Magia Record (spin-off)
- icon

Puella Magi Madoka Magica (Japanese: 魔法少女まどか☆マギカ, Hepburn: Mahō Shōjo Madoka Magika), also known simply as Madoka Magica, is a Japanese anime television series created by Magica Quartet, (Note: Collective names of Akiyuki Shinbo, Gen Urobuchi, Ume Aoki and Shaft) and animated by Shaft. The story follows a group of middle school girls, led by protagonist Madoka Kaname, who make supernatural contracts to become magical girls. In battling surreal enemies known as "witches", they learn of the anguish and peril associated with their new roles. The first ten episodes of the series aired on TBS, MBS, and their affiliates between January and March 2011, while the final two episodes were delayed until April of the same year due to the Tōhoku earthquake and tsunami.

A manga adaptation of the anime and various spin-off manga have been published by Houbunsha and licensed in North America by Yen Press. A novelization by Nitroplus was released in August 2011, and a dedicated magazine, Manga Time Kirara Magica, was launched by Houbunsha in June 2012. A video game for the PlayStation Portable was released in March 2012 and another for the PlayStation Vita was released in December 2013. A mobile game, Magia Record, launched in August 2017, and a three-season anime adaptation produced by Shaft aired from January 2020 to April 2022. Two films recapping the television series, Beginnings and Eternal, were released in October 2012. A third film featuring an original story, Rebellion, was released in October 2013. A sequel film to Rebellion, titled Walpurgisnacht: Rising, premiered in August 2026.

Puella Magi Madoka Magica received widespread critical acclaim, with praise for its complex narrative, visuals, themes, and soundtrack, as well as its unconventional approach to the magical girl subgenre. It became a commercial success; each Blu-ray Disc volume sold more than 50,000 copies in Japan. The series garnered a variety of awards, such as the Television Award at the 16th Animation Kobe Award, as well as 12 Newtype Anime Awards and the Grand Prize for the Animation Division at the 15th Japan Media Arts Festival in 2011.

== Plot ==
In the fictional city of Mitakihara, Japan, middle school student Madoka Kaname and her best friend Sayaka Miki encounter a small, cat-like creature named Kyubey. Kyubey offers them a contract in which a girl may have any wish granted in exchange for obtaining magical powers and being tasked with fighting creatures called witches. Meanwhile, a transfer student and mysterious magical girl named Homura Akemi tries to stop Madoka from making the contract with Kyubey. Madoka and Sayaka meet Mami Tomoe, an upperclassman at their school who is also a magical girl. Noticing their indecisiveness on whether to become magical girls, Mami offers to take Madoka and Sayaka along on her witch hunts so they may learn of the responsibilities of the role.

However, after Mami is unexpectedly killed by a witch, Madoka realizes the life of a magical girl is filled with suffering and pain. This is further enforced by the appearance of Kyoko Sakura, a veteran magical girl whose wish unintentionally caused the death of her family. Madoka also discovers that magical girls give up their souls to form Soul Gems, the source of their magic. When a Soul Gem becomes too tainted with despair it becomes a Grief Seed, irrevocably transforming its owner into a witch.

Sayaka decides to become a magical girl upon learning that a wish could heal her hospitalized friend Kyosuke, a musician on whom she has a crush. However, her friend Hitomi Shizuki confesses her love to him first, causing Sayaka to become disillusioned and fall into an inescapable despair, turning her into a witch. Kyubey reveals to Madoka that they are of an alien race that has been harvesting the emotions of magical girls for centuries to use as energy to counteract the spread of entropy, and thus stave off the heat death of the universe. Madoka also learns that Homura is a magical girl from a different timeline who has repeated the same month countless times via time travel to try to save Madoka from a grisly fate.

Madoka and Kyoko attempt to reverse Sayaka's transformation, but the plan fails and Kyoko is forced to sacrifice herself to allow Madoka to escape, leaving Homura as the only remaining magical girl. Following this, an extremely powerful witch known as Walpurgisnacht approaches the city. Homura attempts to stop it but is defeated. She begins to lose hope and is on the verge of becoming a witch herself when Madoka arrives. With the past month's events in mind, Madoka decides to become a magical girl, despite Homura's efforts to stop her. Madoka makes a wish to stop the creation of all witches in the past, present, and future. The paradoxical nature of the wish causes her to transcend into a psychopomp form, called the "Law of Cycles", which is a new rule of the universe where magical girls are purified and disappear into a higher plane instead of becoming witches. A new reality is formed, and Homura is the only one who remembers Madoka. Homura vows to continue fighting in honor of Madoka and the world she cherished.

== Creation ==
=== Pre-production ===
==== Planning ====
While collaborating on Hidamari Sketch and Bakemonogatari, Akiyuki Shinbo told Aniplex producer Atsuhiro Iwakami he wanted to create a new magical girl series, beginning the development of Puella Magi Madoka Magica. According to Shinbo, while talking with Iwakami, he had mentioned that there was still improvements for him to make to the genre from one of his previous series. During the early planning stage, Iwakami decided not to adapt an existing work to give Shinbo more freedom in his directional style. Another goal of the project was to develop an anime that would appeal to a wider audience than the usual demographic for media within the magical girl subgenre. Iwakami and Shinbo intended their series to be accessible to "the general anime fan". Gen Urobuchi was suggested to be the writer by Iwakami due to his work with the Fate/Zero light novel (which Iwakami gave Shinbo a copy of the first volume to), and Shinbo asked Ume Aoki to be character designer. The series was Urobuchi's first time writing the screenplay for an anime on his own. Takahiro Kishida was arranged to adapt Aoki's character designs for the television series. The series' working title was, at that point, Magical Girl Apocalypse Madoka Magica (魔法少女黙示録 まどかマギカ), and the staff got used to calling it Madoka Magica during production. It was proposed that the "Magical Girl Apocalypse" part of the title be dropped and the series instead be titled simply "Madoka Magica", but Shinbo was adamant in retaining the "Magical Girl" segment of the title, which stuck.

In his role as producer, Iwakami took a mostly hands-off approach to the series. Because Puella Magi Madoka Magica is an original series rather than an adaptation of an existing work, his main goal was "coming up with a high-quality piece of entertainment". After helping to recruit the staff, he allowed them freedom to develop the content of the story, providing minimal guidance. After viewing the character designs that Aoki created, he was sure he could trust the creative talent of the team. In an interview with Anime News Network after the series finished airing in Japan, Iwakami said, "I don't matter much; it's up to those talents to do their work. If something comes to a stand-still I might intervene, but they did an excellent job and I was very happy seeing the results in episode one."

==== Writing ====
During the planning phase, Iwakami asked Urobuchi to make the storyline "heavy". Shinbo specified it should contain copious amounts of blood and violence, elements that were rare in the magical girl genre. Iwakami also asked for many of the magical girl characters to be killed throughout the series. Initially, Urobuchi was unsure of how to approach the work due to his lack of experience with the "magical girl" genre, as well as the fact that he was under the impression that the team consisting of Shinbo, Shaft, and Aoki was that of the "cuter" Hidamari Sketch franchise despite the fact that he had heard he was recommended through Fate/Zero. He said that he had no trouble with these requirements, referencing his past reputation as a writer of very dark and somber stories, the extent of which Shinbo had not known; but found difficulty in mixing the dark elements with Aoki's particular character designs and the genre itself, adding that it seemed like he was "bullying" the Hidamari Sketch characters. To help with the writing, Urobuchi read Hidamari Sketch and noted its themes of "friendship" and then watched two of Shinbo's previous anime series: Magical Girl Lyrical Nanoha, which was a magical girl series, as well as Le Portrait de Petit Cossette, a gothic horror series. He decided to mix the cute characters of Hidamari Sketch with the "disturbing" and "mysterious" atmosphere of Le Portrait de Petit Cossette together in writing the series. Eventually, when the production design duo Gekidan Inu Curry, who had been working on a variety of Shaft works at the time, were added to the roster, Urobuchi said he believed that he could successfully link the two ideas together.

One objective was for the script to contrast starkly with the way the anime was to be marketed. Shinbo planned to advertise the series innocently and purely so as to deliberately conceal its dark undertones. For example, the title logo was rendered using rounded fonts that would appear harmless to audiences. Urobuchi further misled fans by using his Twitter account to persuade them the plot of the series was innocuous. The true nature of the series was disguised because Shinbo wanted its dark themes to be a complete surprise to the viewers. Inconsistencies in the script that neither Shinbo nor Urobuchi noticed would also later be caught by series director Yukihiro Miyamoto and film editor Rie Matsuubara.

Shinbo granted Urobuchi a large amount of autonomy in writing the series and determining the path of the story. In describing his interactions with Iwakami and Shinbo while working on the series, Urobuchi commented that "neither one is the type to show their hand, they would always wait for me to make the next move". To create a successful deconstruction of the magical girl genre, Urobuchi studied aspects of traditional magical girl media that were "troubling or overlooked". He also stated the plot development was heavily influenced by the character drawings by Aoki, and specifically credited horror fiction author Stephen King and Shinbo's previous aforementioned projects. Later speaking on the series' success as the culmination of his works with the studio, Shinbo specifically mentioned fellow Shaft director Shin Oonuma's Ef series as a work which helped him understand cute and beautifully drawn characters mixing with a story featuring heavy themes.

Urobuchi attributed his experience working on projects with screenwriters Ichiro Itano and Yōsuke Kuroda as a major influence in his writing for Puella Magi Madoka Magica, and has referred to both of them as his mentors. To set the initial pacing of the series, Urobuchi used a technique he credited to Kuroda; the first episode would throw the viewer into a later part of the story without any context. The second episode would define the rules governing the story's setting. The third episode would divulge a vital revelation in the plot to hook the viewer. The twist in the third episode was determined during the project proposal stage and involves the death of Mami Tomoe, the main character's mentor. This decision was controversial; Urobuchi said production staff continually approached him and asked him to reconsider because of their fondness for the character. He refused and the plot remained unchanged during production. Urobuchi realized this progression could be very hard for viewers to accept and might hurt the overall series' success with some audiences; he said, "I always thought this is an age where entertainment basically is about soothing and healing, like adopting a style where unchanging day-to-day life is to continue forever".

In an interview with Ultra Jump Egg, Urobuchi gave insight into his writing philosophy, stating that he believed the overarching plot of a story was more important than its characters. He said he would first determine the actions and the ultimate fate of a character before even assigning them a name, and contrasted this with other writing methods that first focused on developing the characters and then creating a storyline for them to follow. He again defended his decision to have Mami die, saying this could have the effect of making the character more memorable, saying, "I think there are quite many characters who became immortal exactly because they died, like Caesar Zeppeli in JoJo's Bizarre Adventure or Raoh in Fist of the North Star. Precisely because of the way they died, they were able to live forever."

Production designers Gekidan Inu Curry were also given an amount of freedom in rewriting certain parts of the script and storyboards. Although initially credited as production designers (later changed to "alternate space designers"), they had freedom to insert new details and to modify existing ones from the original script, such as during a scene in the final episode in which the team added black wings to Homura—something that was not included in Urobuchi's script. The themetic quotations and motifs from Faust and Through The Looking-Glass were also Gekidan Inu Curry's own ideas, according to Urobuchi. Urobuchi praised this aspect of the production, commenting, "additions by the animation production team added more mystery and depth to [the] characters, and without them, it would have been very difficult to write any further stories in the world of the series."

==== Designs ====
Urobuchi stated that Sayaka was his favorite character overall and that her storyline was the most enjoyable to write. Shinbo believed that Sayaka's grim fate by the end of the series was a slightly unfair destiny, and asked Urobuchi if it was possible to change the plot so Sayaka could be spared. Urobuchi declined, saying her death was integral to the overarching story. Shinbo then asked if she could be brought back to life, saying he had become very attached to the character. Urobuchi again refused, saying this would be impossible because of the already-established rules governing the story. Shinbo acquiesced to this, but said he believed there may have been too large a burden placed on the characters who were young, middle-school girls.

The alien character Kyubey was also envisioned and designed by Urobuchi. Iwakami stated that as one of the primary antagonists in the series, "the mash-up of cuteness and darkness is the central theme to Madoka, and Kyubey is an epitome of that theme". A central goal in Urobuchi's writing was to highlight the moral and ethical dissonance between Kyubey and the young middle school girls, which was done through actions such as Kyubey eating their own corpse to regain energy. He compared the character to monsters in the works of horror fiction author H. P. Lovecraft, commenting of Kyubey: "he (sic) isn't evil, it is his lack of feelings that make him scary". Urobuchi also remarked upon the moral ambiguity the series displays in an interview with Asahi Shimbun, stating "Al-Qaeda brought down the Twin Towers due to their self-righteousness. Justice for some people is an evil for others. Good intentions, kindness, and hope will not necessarily make people happy."

Due to unforeseen scheduling problems at Shaft, production of the series was postponed for three years following the completion of its writing. Once the issues were resolved, production continued without further complications. The animation studio led the conception and design of the witches, and created each one's individual backstory. Urobuchi had originally envisioned the witches to be similar to conventional monsters such as Godzilla, but upon seeing the surreal concept art for one of the main witches, Walpurgisnacht, he said; "How can Homura possibly fight against something like this?"

Gekidan Inu Curry's art style and design work is largely Czech- and Russian-inspired stop-motion animation. In their initial meeting with Shinbo for the series, the director told them that the series would be unlike Magical Girl Lyrical Nanoha and instead wanted them to think about the series as more of an extension of Le Portrait de Petit Cossette.

Although they were uncredited for the design work itself, animators Nozomu Abe and Tomohiro Kamitani were recruited as the series' weapon designers and supervised the drawings for all of the sequences they'd appear in as the series' action directors. Abe was responsible for the magical girl weapons, while Kamitani was responsible for all of the real-world weapons like firearms.

==== Music ====
Iwakami and Shinbo recruited Yuki Kajiura to compose the soundtrack for the series after Urobuchi recommended her. Shinbo had previously worked with Kajiura on Le Portrait de Petit Cossette; Urobuchi told of the inspirational effect the music from that series had on him while writing parts of the script. He also said that he had long been a fan of Kajiura's anime soundtracks and praised her work ethic, saying she would always familiarize herself with the story while composing for a series. Japanese pop music duo ClariS was also commissioned to perform the series' opening theme "Connect" (コネクト, Konekuto). Iwakami involved himself in the song's development to ensure it would fit with the series, marking one of the few times he was involved in an aspect of the production. Both "Connect" and the ending theme "Magia" by Kalafina were revealed in a television commercial several weeks before the series' premiere in Japan.

=== Production ===
While the pre-production phase for Madoka Magica was underway, Miyamoto was directing Arakawa Under the Bridge (which Shinbo was also director for) and humorously commented on Madoka Magica looking like a series that would end up stealing all of the resources for the show, as he saw some of its materials (including Gekidan Inu Curry's, who were old classmates and friends of his) around the Shaft office. Ironically, just a few months before broadcast, Miyamoto was also recruited and asked to be the series director. His initial job as director was gathering materials for designs and the show's look alongside Shaft's animation producer Tadao Iwaki. He was also involved in the discussions regarding the action scenes with Urobuchi, Shinbo, and action director Nozumu Abe, such as solidifying the logic behind Kyoko's multi-jointed spear and how it would work in certain settings. One of the aspects that had yet been undefined even as the series started airing was how Homura's shield in episode 8 worked. It wasn't until sometime before broadcast that Urobuchi came up with the idea while riding on a train one day. Due to the workload at Shaft and a lack of production time, it was decided early on that Shaft would only produce episodes 1–3, 10, and 12 in-house, with the rest being outsourced to other studios and Shaft's staff intermittently assisting with them.

Although Takahiro Kishida was responsible for adapting Aoki's designs for animation, he did not continue working on the project extensively into the production phase as a chief animation director (responsible for overseeing and correcting drawings and animation). Instead, animators Junichirou Taniguchi (from studio Doga Kobo) and Mika Takahashi were recruited as chief animation directors. Taniguchi mentioned Genichirou Abe's work on the series as impressionable and that Yoshiaki Itou's work inspired him to push the limits of the character's expressions. Action director Kamitani noted difficulty in understanding Shaft's general style, as well as the "strange" structure that the anime's production had due to the involvement of Gekidan Inu Curry's material. Kamitani and Nozomu Abe often consulted with each other regarding the design work and their interpretations of certain scenes. In one scene, the storyboards for episode 11 had a fighter jet crashing into Walpurgisnacht which they believed to be too difficult to draw, so they consulted with Urobuchi and instead decided to use a Tomahawk missile.

The opening animation was directed by Tomoyuki Itamura. Shinbo did not give him any particular orders but told him to make it catchy, which he thinks Itamura succeeded in doing. For the opening song itself, Shinbo was surprised that the lyrics matched so well with the anime, as they were written without the context of the story, and he considered it to be a fun coincidence. The ending animation was directed and animated by Hirofumi Suzuki, who had worked with Shinbo on Le Portrait de Petit Cossette, which also had a coincidental thematic similarity to the series.

Some drawings featured in the series were not drawn by the anime's production staff, but rather by the voice actors. For example, Aoki found it difficult trying to draw the contents of Madoka's in-universe notebooks "realistically" as a middle-schooler would rather than a professional artist, so Iwakami suggested that Aoi Yūki, the voice actress of Madoka, draw the sketches herself. Shinbo then asked Yūki to purposefully draw the sketches worse than she otherwise would and joked that she was a better artist than he was.

== Broadcast and distribution ==
Blu-ray box set for the anime series

On January 7, 2011, Puella Magi Madoka Magica debuted on Mainichi Broadcasting System (MBS), Tokyo Broadcasting System (TBS), and Chubu-Nippon Broadcasting (CBC) in Japan. The first ten episodes aired weekly without interruption and were made available for streaming on Nico Nico Douga and BIGLOBE's Anime One service. That March, the planned broadcasts of the last two episodes were halted because of the 2011 Tōhoku earthquake and tsunami; TBS also canceled its scheduled airing of the 10th episode so it could provide more news coverage of the natural disaster.

Urobuchi apologized to viewers for the delays; he also said the postponements could be viewed in a positive light because they alleviated some production pressures on animation studio Shaft because of the tight broadcast schedule. Citing particularly challenging drawings for episodes 11 and 12, Urobuchi and Iwakami planned to have Shaft continue to improve the episodes up until their rescheduled broadcasts. According to Urobuchi, if episode 11 had been aired in its current state as scheduled, the result would likely have been disappointing. On March 23, 2011, the broadcast for the rest of the series was indefinitely delayed, but the production team reported that they were continuing to work on the episodes and announced their intention to finish airing the series by April. On April 10, 2011, the official website for Puella Magi Madoka Magica announced that broadcasts would resume on April 22. Episodes 11 and 12 aired back-to-back on MBS while TBS and CBC ran episode 10 together with episodes 11 and 12.

Iwakami later commented on this unique production experience in an interview with Anime News Network. He said Shaft was always pressed for time during the production process and only just completed each episode before its air time. After the earthquake and tsunami, he stated that many of the company's staff were upset by the incident and were unable to work effectively on episodes 11 and 12. He said, however, "a week went by, and two weeks went by, and the staff started saying that they couldn't stay in shock forever, that they had to keep on going, and then production continued". The series was released on six Blu-ray Disc (BD) and DVD volumes between April 27 and September 21, 2011, having been delayed by the earthquake from the original release date of March 30, 2011. Drama CDs were included with the first, third, and fifth BD/DVD volumes. The sixth and final volume released on September 21, 2011, contains a director's edit of episode 12. The series began streaming on Crunchyroll on February 15, 2012, as well as on Hulu and Crackle.

Aniplex of America released the series in North America, including an English dub, in three BD and DVD volumes released between February 14 and June 12, 2012. Aniplex also released limited editions containing the original soundtrack CDs and special items. Manga Entertainment licensed the series in the United Kingdom and released it on October 29, 2012, on BD and DVD in a complete collection. Madman Entertainment licensed the series in Australia, where it was broadcast on the children's channel ABC3 on June 29, 2013, following an early preview on January 6. The dubbed series began streaming on Viz Media's streaming service Neon Alley in late 2013. In Italy, the series was broadcast on Rai 4 on February 5 until April 22, 2012. On September 1, 2018, a television anime series based on the smartphone game Magia Record was announced. It aired from January 4 to March 29, 2020.

== Related media ==
=== Films ===
In November 2011, it was announced in the December issue of Kadokawa Shoten's Newtype magazine that Shaft was developing a three-part theatrical film project. The first two films, titled Beginnings and Eternal, are compilations of the anime television series featuring re-recorded voice lines and some new animation. The first film, which covers the first eight episodes of the television series, was released in theaters on October 6, 2012, while the second film, which covers the last four episodes, was released on October 13, 2012. The first two films were screened in selected locations in the United States and seven other countries between October 2012 and February 2013; they were also screened at Anime Festival Asia between November 10 and 11, 2012, in Singapore. The two films were released on Blu-ray Disc and DVD on July 30, 2013, in standard and collector's edition sets and is being made available for import by Aniplex of America.

The third film, titled Rebellion, is a sequel to the television series, featuring a new story written by Urobuchi. It was released to Japanese theaters on October 26, 2013. The film received a North American imported release on December 3, 2013. The first and second films were re-released with an English dub on July 15, 2014.

A short concept film for a new story, described as a "movie-based image board", debuted at Shaft's anniversary exhibition Madogatari on November 27, 2015. Shaft representative director and president Mitsutoshi Kubota later confirmed in an interview in Newtype that the concept film will launch a new Puella Magi Madoka Magica project.

At the 10th anniversary event held on April 25, 2021, a sequel film to Rebellion, titled Walpurgisnacht: Rising, was announced. It was scheduled to be released in Q1 2024; however, it was later delayed. The film premiered on August 28, 2026.

=== Print media ===
Houbunsha has published several manga series based on Puella Magi Madoka Magica. A direct adaptation of the anime series was illustrated by Hanokage and published in three four-chapter tankōbon volumes that were released between February 12 and May 30, 2011. The manga has been licensed in North America by Yen Press. A side story manga titled Puella Magi Kazumi Magica: The Innocent Malice (魔法少女かずみ☆マギカ〜The innocent malice〜, Mahō Shōjo Kazumi Magika: The Innocent Malice), which was written by Masaki Hiramatsu and illustrated by Takashi Tensugi, was serialized in Manga Time Kirara Forward between March 2011 and January 2013. A third manga titled Puella Magi Oriko Magica (魔法少女おりこ☆マギカ, Mahō Shōjo Oriko Magika), which was written by Kuroe Mura, was released in two tankōbon volumes on May 12, 2011, and June 12, 2011. Both Kazumi Magica and Oriko Magica have been licensed by Yen Press in North America. The first volume of Kazumi Magica was released in May 2013. Puella Magi Madoka Magica: Wraith Arc (魔法少女まどか☆マギカ［魔獣編］), which was written and illustrated by Hanokage, began serialization in the 20th issue of Manga Time Kirara Magica released on June 10, 2015. The plot describes the events that happened between Puella Magi Madoka Magica the Movie: Eternal and Puella Magi Madoka Magica the Movie: Rebellion. Yen Press will publish it in English.

The first volume of an official anthology comic featuring illustrations by guest artists was released on September 12, 2011. A dedicated monthly magazine published by Houbunsha and titled Manga Time Kirara Magica (まんがタイムきらら☆マギカ, Manga Taimu Kirara Magika) was launched on June 8, 2012; it features various manga stories, including spin-off stories of Oriko Magica. A film comic adaptation of the series titled Puella Magi Madoka Magica: Film Memories went on sale on May 26, 2012. Puella Magi Madoka Magica: The Different Story, another manga by Hanokage, was published in three tankōbon volumes between October 12 and November 12, 2012, and was licensed by Yen Press in 2014. The first volume of Puella Magi Suzune Magica (魔法少女すずね☆マギカ), which was written and illustrated by Gan, was released on November 12, 2013, before being serialized in Manga Time Kirara Magica on November 22, 2013. Puella Magi Homura Tamura (魔法少女ほむら☆たむら), which was written and illustrated by Afro, is serialized in Manga Time Kirara Magica; its first volume was released in October 2013 and was licensed by Yen Press. Puella Magi Homura's Revenge! (魔法少女まどか☆マギカ ほむらリベンジ!), written by Kawazukuu and illustrated by Masugitsune, was serialized in Manga Time Kirara Magica and released two volumes in December 2013; Yen Press licensed the manga.

Hajime Ninomae wrote a novel adaptation of the series that was illustrated by Yūpon and published by Nitroplus on August 14, 2011. Pre-release copies were available at Comiket 80 on August 12, 2011. A book titled Puella Magi Madoka Magica: The Beginning Story, which is based on Gen Urobuchi's original draft treatment for the anime, was released in November 2011.

=== Video games ===
A video game based on the series titled Puella Magi Madoka Magica Portable (魔法少女まどか☆マギカ ポータブル, Mahō Shōjo Madoka Magika Pōtaburu) was released by Namco Bandai Games on PlayStation Portable on March 15, 2012. The game allows players to take many routes and change the ending of the story. Urobuchi returned as the writer and Shaft animated the title, while Yusuke Tomizawa and Yoshinao Doi produced it. The game was released in two editions; a standard box including a bonus DVD, and a limited-edition box containing a Madoka Figma, a bonus Blu-ray Disc, a Kyubey pouch, a 'HomuHomu' handkerchief and a special clear card. An action game for the PlayStation Vita titled Puella Magi Madoka Magica: The Battle Pentagram (魔法少女まどかマギカThe Battle Pentagram) was developed by Artdink and published by Namco Bandai Games, and was released in Japan on December 19, 2013. The game features an original story that was created with guidance from Urobuchi in which all five magical girls team up to defeat a powerful witch called Walpurgis Night. Upon release, a limited-edition version that included codes for additional in-game costumes and merchandise such as a CD copy of the game's soundtrack and an art book, was also on sale.

A free smartphone application called Mami's Heart Pounding Tiro Finale (マミのドキドキティロフィナーレ, Mami no Doki Doki Tiro Fināre) was released on October 14, 2011. A third-person shooter (TPS) titled Puella Magi Madoka Magica TPS featuring Homura Akemi was released for Android devices in December 2011. A second TPS title featuring Mami was released in August 2012 and a third featuring Sayaka and Kyoko was released on October 16, 2012. A puzzle game for iOS devices titled Puella Magi Madoka Magica Puzzle of Memories was released on March 29, 2013. Costumes from Puella Magi Madoka Magica, alongside content based on other anime and games, are available in Japan as downloadable content (DLC) for the PSP game Gods Eater Burst. Costumes and accessories are also available as DLC for Tales of Xillia 2, and were available for Phantasy Star Online 2 in October 2013. Another collaboration with the mobile game Phantom of the Kill took place for an event that ran from August 8, 2015, to September 21, 2015. During that campaign, players had a chance of obtaining playable Madoka characters through in-game lotteries. Puella Magi Madoka Magica-themed missions, weapons and items were also available at that time.

A pachinko game titled Slot Puella Magi Madoka Magica was released in 2013, and a second pachinko game titled Slot Puella Magi Madoka Magica 2 was released in 2016. Slot Puella Magi Madoka Magica 2 features the song "Naturally" by Aoi Yūki and Eri Kitamura. Also in 2016, the smartphone game Girl Friend Beta announced a collaboration with Puella Magi Madoka Magica in which players got a Madoka card as a log-in bonus. A smartphone game called Magia Record: Puella Magi Madoka Magica Side Story, was released in Japan on August 22, 2017. The game features a new protagonist named Iroha Tamaki, who arrives in Kamihama City to search for her missing sister. The game features the theme song "Kakawari" (かかわり, "Connection") by TrySail.

A video game, titled Puella Magi Madoka Magica: Magia Exedra, was released for iOS and Android devices on March 27, 2025. The game was initially scheduled for release in 2024, but was delayed. For the game, FictionJunction performed the theme song "Lighthouse", with Lino Leia as the main vocalist. Just before its release, it was announced that the game had reached 1 million pre-registrations. A PC version of the game was released on Steam on July 17, 2015.

== Reception ==
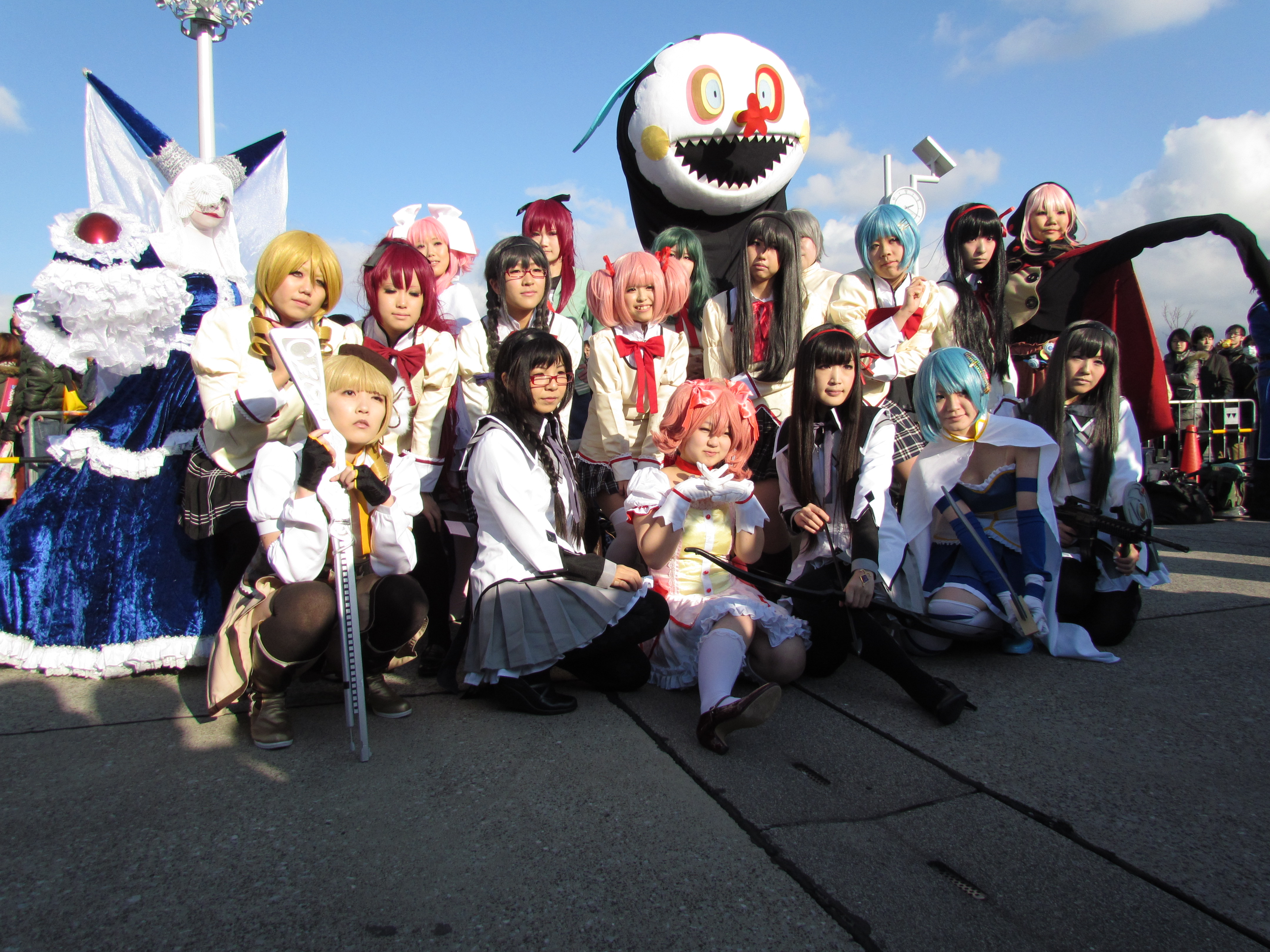
Cosplay of Puella Magi Madoka Magica's cast at Comiket 83 in August 2013

=== Critical reception ===
Puella Magi Madoka Magica received widespread critical acclaim. Masaki Tsuji lauded the series' world-building and narrative as well as the character development, and called the series groundbreaking. Masaki went on to say that Madoka Magica had reached a "level of perfection", and noted that the series was worthy of people's admiration. UK Anime Network's Andy Hanley rated the anime 10 out of 10, lauding it for its deeply emotional content and described it as immersive and filled with grandiose visuals along with an evocative soundtrack. He recommended watching it several times to fully comprehend the complex and multi-layered plot. Hanley called it the greatest television anime series of the 21st century thus far. Scott Green of Ain't It Cool News called the series "hugely admirable"; he praised the animation team's attention to detail, stating that the series "would not work nearly as well if the characters in general and as magical girls specifically weren't presented so spectacularly winningly by the production". Green also said he would highly recommend Puella Magi Madoka Magica to anyone with an interest in anime.

Michael Pementel of Bloody Disgusting called Madoka Magica a "fascinating work" and lauded its dark atmosphere and horror elements. Pementel highly praised the show's aesthetics and wrote that the "pacing in revealing twists" is one of the "show's most exceptional qualities" and also commended the characters' tragic arcs, particularly those of Sayaka and Homura. He further praised the series for offering a "unique, grim twist that not only seeps the show in despair, but subverts the subgenre", concluding that Madoka Magica "stands as one of the best works of anime horror, presenting characters that must strive to find hope through profound darkness." THEM Anime Reviews reviewer Tim Jones called it "beautiful, well-written, and surprisingly dark", and gave it four out of five stars. Jones also commended the unique animation and design of the backdrops shown during witch fights, which he described as "surreal, beautiful, [and] trippy". In his review of the three Blu-ray volumes of the anime series, Zac Bertschy of Anime News Network characterized the story as very emotionally dark and one of the most ambitious and beautiful anime series in recent memory. He awarded each of the volumes ratings of A or A+ overall, and stated, "Time will tell us whether or not this show will be remembered as fondly as it is regarded by the fan community now, but it feels like a masterpiece, something to be appreciated again and again. It is a must-see for anyone remotely interested in what anime can accomplish as an art form".

Awarding the series five stars out of five, Common Sense Media wrote that the "animation style is full of fluid motion and attention to detail that makes it a uniquely pleasurable experience to watch" and "the main characters [are] well developed and its hard not to get attached to them as the story progresses". Reviewers highly praised the series' darker approach to the magical girl subgenre. In its review of the series, the staff at Japanator said this trope "added a level of depth and complexity to the genre that we haven't ever seen, and I don't think we will see again ... [a]dding on that dressing gave the show a more perverse and cruel feeling to it, making it all the more compelling to watch". Liz Ohanesian of LA Weekly attributed the series' popularity with older, male audiences—an otherwise unusual demographic to the genre—to the genre deconstruction of Puella Magi Madoka Magica. She also commented on the series' cultural impact, writing that there was incredible fan interest for the series in Japan and the US. She credited the all-star crew including writer Urobuchi, director Shinbo, and the Shaft animation studio as "hitmakers" and described the anime as "a series designed for acclaim". TechnologyTell's Jenni Lada wrote that the show's external appearance belied its true "darker and more twisted" essence. She recommended viewers watch at least three episodes to discover the series' true nature.

According to Sara Cleto and Erin Bah, the subversion of the magical girl genre "draw[s] attention to the question of narrative power"—particularly in the use of alternative timelines—as the characters fight for their survival. Production I.G's Katsuyuki Motohiro watched the series after hearing opinions that it exceeded Neon Genesis Evangelion. Upon viewing the series, he was "amazed that there was a person who could write such a work" and began analyzing Urobuchi's other works; he was motivated to ask Urobuchi to write the crime thriller Psycho-Pass. In issue 103 of Neo, journalist Matt Kamen wrote, "With its daring approach to a dated genre, Puella Magi Madoka Magica essentially does for magical girls what Neon Genesis Evangelion did for giant robots". Writing for Kotaku, critic Richard Eisenbeis hailed the series as "one of the best anime" and wrote, "It deconstructs the magical girl genre and builds an emotional narrative filled with memorable characters". Joshua Greenberg of The Daily Bruin described it as "a creepy, deconstructionist take on the [magical girl] genre."

=== Sales ===
The first Blu-ray volume of the series sold 53,000 copies in its first week, 22,000 of which were sold on its first day, breaking the record held by the sixth BD volume of Bakemonogatari. The second volume sold 54,000 copies, breaking the first volume's record. Each subsequent volume sold over 50,000 copies in their first week. As of October 2012, the total sales of BD and DVDs of the series exceeded 600,000 copies, which was unusual for a late-night program at that time. This was despite controversy over the pricing of the volumes, which some considered to be unfairly high. The staff at Japanator stated they could not recommend the volume to their readers due to the prohibitive cost. Bertschy concurred, writing that the "limited episode count and high price of entry make the show inaccessible to an audience unwilling to shell out". The 2017 compilation album Puella Magi Madoka Magica Ultimate Best ranked at No. 4 on Oricon's weekly albums chart, having sold over 13,500 copies. By the end of 2017, Ultimate Best was the 29th best-selling anime CD album of the year.

Japanese newspaper Nihon Keizai Shimbun reported that Puella Magi Madoka Magica had grossed over ¥40 billion ($400 million) from the sales of related goods within two years of its release. A live broadcast of the entire series was streamed on Nico Nico Douga on June 18, 2011, garnering around a million viewers and surpassing the previous streaming audience record of 570,000 held by Lucky Star. According to Google Zeitgeist, Madoka Magica was the most-searched and fastest-rising search query in the anime category of 2011.

=== Accolades ===
Puella Magi Madoka Magica won the Television Award at the 16th Animation Kobe Awards, as well as 12 Newtype Anime Awards, and the Grand Prize for animation in the 15th Japan Media Arts Festival awards, making it the first and only original anime television to win the award, with the jury describing the series in their justification as "an outstanding animation with an ingenious magical scenario" and commended the "ambitious" show for "skillfully setting critical traps that shook the very foundations of the genre". It was nominated for the 32nd Nihon SF Taisho Award and won the 2011 Bronze Prize for Kyubey's catchphrase. It also won three 11th Tokyo Anime Awards in the categories of Television Category, Best Director and Best Screenplay, and the Selection Committee Special Prize award at the 2012 Licensing of the Year awards. Madoka Magica was awarded a 43rd Seiun Award for "Best Media" at the 2012 Japan Science Fiction Convention, and was also awarded a Sisterhood Prize at the 11th Sense of Gender Awards. In 2015, the show was awarded the inaugural 1st Sugoi Japan Award Grand Prix, Japan's nationwide vote for manga, anime, and novels considered as cultural assets that have the potential to be beloved all over the world, among all of the works published since 2005. In 2017, Madoka Magica was selected as the best anime of 2011 by the Tokyo Anime Award Festival.

Multiple media publications have hailed Puella Magi Madoka Magica as one of the best anime series of the 2010s, including Polygon, Thrillist, Looper, IGN, Crunchyroll, and Anime UK News. The Brazilian website Legiao Dos Herois listed the series as one of "10 most successful anime" of the 2010s.

==== Awards and nominations ====
| Award/Category | | Recipient | Result |
|---|---|---|---|
| 15th Japan Media Arts Festival Awards | Grand Prize | Puella Magi Madoka Magica | Won |
| 16th Animation Kobe Awards | Television Award | Puella Magi Madoka Magica | Won |
| 11th Tokyo Anime Awards | Television Award | Puella Magi Madoka Magica | Won |
| 11th Tokyo Anime Awards | Best Director | Akiyuki Shinbo | Won |
| 11th Tokyo Anime Awards | Best Screenplay | Gen Urobuchi | Won |
| 2011 Newtype Anime Awards | Grand Prize in Television | Puella Magi Madoka Magica | Won |
| 2011 Newtype Anime Awards | Best Director | Akiyuki Shinbo | Won |
| 2011 Newtype Anime Awards | Best Screenplay | Gen Urobuchi | Won |
| 2011 Newtype Anime Awards | Fictional Character Award in Female | Homura Akemi | Won |
| 2011 Newtype Anime Awards | Fictional Character Award in Female | Madoka Kaname | Ranked 2nd |
| 2011 Newtype Anime Awards | Fictional Character Award in Mascot | Kyubey | Won |
| 2011 Newtype Anime Awards | Actress Award | Aoi Yūki | Won |
| 2011 Newtype Anime Awards | Supporting Actress Award | Chiwa Saitō | Won |
| 2011 Newtype Anime Awards | Supporting Actress Award | Eri Kitamura | Ranked 3rd |
| 2011 Newtype Anime Awards | Supporting Actress Award | Emiri Katō | Ranked 5th |
| 2011 Newtype Anime Awards | Theme Song Award | "Connect" | Won |
| 2011 Newtype Anime Awards | Accompaniment Award | Puella Magi Madoka Magica | Won |
| 2011 Newtype Anime Awards | Photography Award | Puella Magi Madoka Magica | Won |
| 2011 Newtype Anime Awards | Art Award | Puella Magi Madoka Magica | Won |
| 2011 Newtype Anime Awards | Character Design Award | Puella Magi Madoka Magica | Won |
| 2011 Newtype Anime Awards | Color Setting Award | Puella Magi Madoka Magica | Won |
| 2011 Newtype Anime Awards | Sound Award | Puella Magi Madoka Magica | Won |
| 2011 Newtype Anime Awards | Trailer Award | Puella Magi Madoka Magica | Ranked 2nd |
| 32nd Nihon SF Taisho Award | Grand Prize | Puella Magi Madoka Magica | Nominated |
| 43rd Seiun Award | Best Media | Puella Magi Madoka Magica | Won |
| 11th Sense of Gender Awards | Sisterhood Prize | Puella Magi Madoka Magica | Won |
| 19th Anime & Manga Grand Prix | Best Hope Award | Puella Magi Madoka Magica | Won |
| 20th Anime & Manga Grand Prix | Japanese Anime of the Year | Puella Magi Madoka Magica | Won |
| 34th Anime Grand Prix Editors Choice 2011 | Anime of the Year | Puella Magi Madoka Magica | Won |
| 34th Anime Grand Prix Editors Choice 2011 | Female Character of the Year | Homura Akemi | Won |
| 1st Nikkan Sports Anime Competition | Television Award | Puella Magi Madoka Magica | Won |
| 1st Nikkan Sports Anime Competition | Award of Queen | Madoka Kaname | Won |
| 1st Nikkan Sports Anime Competition | Guilty Dark Character Award | Kyubey | Won |
| 1st Nikkan Sports Anime Competition | Theme Song Award | "Connect" | Won |
| 1st Nikkan Sports Anime Competition | MIP Female Voice Actor Award | Aoi Yūki | Won |
| 6th Seiyu Awards | Actress Award | Aoi Yūki | Won |
| 6th Seiyu Awards | Supporting Actress Award | Emiri Katō | Won |
| 2011 Top Buzzword Award | Bronze Prize | "Make a contract with me, and become a magical girl." | Won |
| Licensing of the Year 2012 in JAPAN | Selection Committee Special Prize award | Puella Magi Madoka Magica | Won |
| 1st Sugoi Japan Award | Grand Prix | Puella Magi Madoka Magica | Won |
| 1st Sugoi Japan Award | Best Anime | Puella Magi Madoka Magica | Won |
| NHK Nippon Anime 100 | Best Television in Men's Vote | Puella Magi Madoka Magica | Won |
| NHK Nippon Anime 100 | Best Television in Comprehensive | Puella Magi Madoka Magica | Ranked 3rd |
| NHK Nippon Anime 100 | Best Theme Song | "Connect" | Ranked 11th |
| NHK Selection to Commemorate the 50th Anniversary of TV Anime | Favorite Actress | Homura Akemi | Ranked 2nd |
| NHK Selection to Commemorate the 50th Anniversary of TV Anime | Favorite Actress | Madoka Kaname | Ranked 7th |
| Heisei Anison Award | Award | "Connect" | Won |

=== Legacy ===
The radio station Tokyo FM reported that Puella Magi Madoka Magica had developed into a social phenomenon in Japan. Toussaint Egan of Paste magazine stated that the series was "widely celebrated by fans and critics alike" upon its release and that the show is "a postmodern reconfiguration of genre tropes rife with plot twists and existential malaise on a cosmic horror level". The Spanish film director Carlos Vermut has cited Madoka Magica as a large influence on his 2014 film Magical Girl. Anime director Hiroyuki Imaishi said that darker-toned series like Madoka Magica are an "industry trend". The series also inspired a Nigerian magical girl franchise, Adorned by Chi.

== Notes ==
=== Works cited ===
- Magica Quartet (2011). 魔法少女まどか☆マギカ公式ガイドブック you are not alone. [Puella Magi Madoka Magica Official Guidebook you are not alone.]. Houbunsha. ISBN 978-4832240612.
- Shinbo, Akiyuki (July 27, 2012). 新房語 [Shinbogatari] (in Japanese). Ichijinsha. ISBN 978-4758012591.
- Takahashi, Yumi, ed. (November 23, 2019). Akiyuki Shimbo x Shaft Chronicle (in Japanese). Dotcom. ISBN 978-4835457017.
