= Sanarara =

2005 video game

- Developer: NekoNeko Soft
- Publisher: NekoNeko Soft
- Platform: Windows
- Release: JP: April 29, 2005
- Genres: Eroge, Visual novel
- Mode: Single-player

Sanarara (サナララ) is a Japanese adult visual novel developed by NekoNeko Soft. It was released on April 29, 2005 for Windows as a DVD. It was rereleased on August 27, 2010 as part of NekoNeko 3rd Premium Box.

== Gameplay ==
The gameplay in Sanarara requires little interaction from the player, as most of the duration of the game is only spent on reading the text that appears on the lower portion of the screen, representing either dialogue between characters, or the inner thoughts of the protagonist. Every so often, the player will come to a "decision point", where players are given the chance to choose from multiple options. The time between these points varies and can occur anywhere from a minute to much longer. Text progression pauses at these points and depending on the choices that the player makes, the plot will progress in a specific direction. There are multiple plot lines that the player will have the chance to experience. To view all of the plot lines, the player will need to replay the game multiple times, access different areas and make different choices to progress the plot in an alternate direction. One of the goals of the gameplay is to view the hentai scenes, depicting one of the protagonists having sexual intercourse with one of the heroines.

== Plot and characters ==
Unlike most visual novels, Sanarara consists of four chapters and follows the stories of four protagonists.

- Nozomi Shiina, a shy girl who, despite her age, has never had a boyfriend due to her bashfulness.
- Ayumi Takatsuki, classmate and childhood friend of the Player Character, a strong minded and argumentative girl, who really likes kiwis.
- Ryo Mieno, an avid daydreamer who loves fairy tales. Though she attends a private single-sex school, she wants to attend the same school as the Player Character.
- Yuriko Yagami, who hates nothing more than standing out in a crowd, and so tries to be as average as possible, though it's clear that she is much more interesting than what she portrays.
