= Kyubey =

Puella Magi Madoka Magica character

- Puella Magi Madoka Magica character
- Kyubey, as seen in Puella Magi Madoka Magica
- First appearance: "As If I Met Her in My Dream..." (2011)
- Created by: Gen Urobuchi; Ume Aoki
- Designed by: Ume Aoki; Takahiro Kishida
- Voiced by: Japanese: Emiri Katō; English: Cassandra Lee Morris

In-universe information
- Gender: None
- Species: Cat-like alien, true form likely different
- Other name: Incubator

Kyubey (Japanese: キュゥべえ, Hepburn: Kyūbē) is a character of the 2011 anime series Puella Magi Madoka Magica and its 2013 sequel The Rebellion Story. They are also a "messenger of magic" that can grant any wish to a certain girl, on the condition that she become a magical girl and fight against the witches, who are in fact themselves corrupted magical girls. It is later revealed that their true name is Incubator. Kyubey's true goal in creating magical girls and witches is to counter entropy and stave off the heat death of the universe.

== Creation and design ==
Kyubey was created and designed by writer Gen Urobuchi. As one of the primary villains in the series, producer Atsuhiro Iwakami stated that "the mash-up of cuteness and darkness is the central theme to Puella Magi Madoka Magica, and Kyubey is an epitome of that theme." A central goal in Urobuchi's writing was to highlight the moral and ethical dissonance between Kyubey and the young girls, which was done through actions in the series such as Kyubey eating their own corpse in order to recycle energy. Urobuchi compared Kyubey to monsters occurring in the works of horror fiction author H. P. Lovecraft, commenting of the character: "He isn't evil, it is his lack of feelings that makes him scary."

Kyubey's name is similar to the Japanese for incubator (インクユベイトル; inkuybeitoru) and also the name of the mythological nine-tailed fox (九尾狐; kyūbi).

== Appearances ==
=== In Madoka Magica ===
Kyubey is a sexless extraterrestrial cat-like being posing as a familiar who can grant any wish to a certain girl, on the condition that she becomes a magical girl and fight against witches. When the chosen girl makes a contract with them, they extract her soul and places it inside a soul gem, reconstructing her body into a shell that is more resilient in order to fight witches. They constantly try to get Madoka Kaname to make a contract with them, as she allegedly possesses great magical potential within her that would allow her to become the most powerful magical girl. They can only be seen or heard by magical girls and those with "magical" potential and is able to communicate with them telepathically.

Kyubey is later revealed to be a member of a hive-minded race called the Incubators, who eat their dead and take their predecessor's place and identity. The Incubators developed the technology to convert emotions into energy, which they use to counter entropy and prevent the impending heat death of the universe. Having evaluated countless races throughout the universe, the Incubators find ideal subjects among humans, specifically pubescent and prepubescent girls as they produce the most energy which reaches its zenith when a magical girl's soul gem turns into a grief seed. Kyubey claims their race lacks emotions (or, at least, that those in his race who have emotions are abnormal). They have little understanding of mortality or the value of life, considering their actions to simply be utilitarian in nature despite appearing cruel to others. Despite this, Kyubey is a skilled manipulator who leaves out the vital aspects of their contracts and only reveals the truth when asked, such as neglecting to explain that the creation of a soul gem involves the literal removal of the soul from their bodies until after its consequences are made evident. According to Kyubey, the very existence of the Magi-Witch system is what allowed the evolution of mankind's civilization, as many of the main events in human history have involved magical girls. Despite having answered all questions pointed their way, there is still much about the universe that Kyubey has not spoken of.

In the side-story manga Puella Magi Kazumi Magica, Kyubey also appears as the contractor of all the magical girls in Asanaru City, including the Pleiades Saints. When the Pleiades learned the truth about magical girls, they took one of Kyubey's corpses and used it to create their Incubator Jubey, who could absorb darkness from soul gems. Furthermore, they had Umika cast a spell that would make Kyubey invisible to all other girls in the city and rewrite their own memories to believe they contracted with Jubey, in an attempt to stop more witches from being born. This ultimately backfires as Jubey turns out to be a failure.

In The Rebellion Story, which takes place after the series, Kyubey seals Homura outside the Law of Cycles' jurisdiction to force Madoka back into the physical world in an attempt to restore the witch system of the previous timelines since their kind has been harvesting less energy in the new system. Unfortunately, their plan backfires when Homura ended up stealing Madoka's powers for herself, enslaving the Incubators to take Madoka's place in taking on the curses of the new world. In the post-credits scene, Kyubey is last seen lying on the ground, disheveled and shivering, mentally scarred.

=== In other media ===
A large amount of merchandise based on Kyubey has been created, such as a nendoroid figure by the Good Smile Company; QB Sofa and Bath Set; plush doll; and a hugging pillow.

== Reception and legacy ==
Kyubey won the 1st Newtype Anime Awards for Best Mascot Character in 2011. They took third place and fifth place in the following two years, in 2013 and 2014. Kyubey won the 2011 Net Buzzword's Bronze Prize for his popular catchphrase; and also won the 1st Nikkan Anime Grand Prix's "Worst Dark Character" award by the Nikkan Sports newspaper. Emiri Katō won the 6th Seiyu Awards for Best supporting actress in 2012 for her portrayal of Kyubey. In December 2015, Kyubey was included among the "Anime's Most Despicable Villains", a poll conducted by MyNavi Student. They were voted third cutest mascot character.

Andy Hanley from UK Anime Network initially described them as an "odd cat-like figure". Gabriella Ekens of Anime News Network characterized them as "the alien embodiment of utilitarian logic." Jacob Churosh of THEM Anime Reviews described, "Emiri Katou's contribution in the role of Kyuubey is also considerable; although he (sic) initially seems rather monotonously cheerful, Katou eventually manages to convey the relentless, strange rationality—what one might call the alien logic—that drives him." EJ Rivera, marking specialist for the Aniplex of America, stated in 2012 that "Fans love to hate him (sic)."

The Kyubey character, for his (sic) part, is a screenwriting accomplishment in and of itself. So fleshed-out and complete is his worldview that it's hard not to start (ironically) empathizing with how he sees things, and the reveal of exactly who and what he is—and how he sees the world—is executed so well it's thrilling in and of itself. As a result, Kyubey has all the best dialogue in the show, and some of it is laugh-out-loud hilarious near the end, putting a button on everything that's happening with a cold, calculating attitude. We don't see this kind of character writing often, and that it's accomplished so well here is a minor miracle. Simply put, it just shouldn't work as well as it does, but the proof is all there on screen.

— Zac Bertschy, Anime News Network

Kyubey was listed by Paste magazine as the eighth-greatest anime villain. Lynzee Loveridge of Anime News Network ranked them at number 3 of "8 Shocking Betrayals" list for deceiving the magical girls. Comic Book Resources ranked Kyubey first in the website's "The 20 Strongest Alien Species In Anime" list, with writer Ashley Glenn stating "this is perhaps one of the most powerful aliens out there". Game Revolution also included Kyubey among their "greatest anime betrayals ever" list.
