= Puella Magi Madoka Magica: Rebellion =

2013 Japanese anime film

- Puella Magi Madoka Magica -Rebellion-
- Promotional poster featuring main character Homura Akemi
- 劇場版 魔法少女まどか☆マギカ［新編］叛逆の物語; Gekijōban Mahō Shōjo Madoka Magika [Shinpen] Hangyaku no Monogatari
- Genre: Dark fantasy; Magical girl
- Creators: Magica Quartet: Akiyuki Shinbo; Gen Urobuchi; Ume Aoki; Shaft
- Directors: Akiyuki Shinbo (Note: Chief Director (総監督).); Yukihiro Miyamoto; Hiroyuki Terao (Note: Assistant Director (副監督). See the Shaft director credits legend.)
- Screenplay: Gen Urobuchi (Note: Part of the screenplay related to the witches, and some scenes like the "tea party scene", were revised or added by Doroinu of Gekidan Inu Curry without credit.)
- Character designers: Takahiro Kishida; Junichirou Taniguchi
- Music: Yuki Kajiura
- Country of origin: Japan
- Original language: Japanese

Production
- Sound director: Youta Tsuruoka
- Art director: Ken Naitou
- Cinematographer: Shinichirou Etou
- Color designers: Hitoshi Hibino; Izumi Takizawa
- Editor: Rie Matsubara
- Animation producer: Yasuhiro Okada
- Studio: Shaft
- Producers: Atsuhiro Iwakami; Mitsutoshi Kubota
- Production companies: Madoka Movie Project Rebellion; Aniplex; Houbunsha; Hakuhodo DY Media Partners; Nitroplus; Shaft; Movic; MBS
- Distributor: Warner Bros. Pictures
- Runtime: 116 minutes

Original release
- Release: October 26, 2013

Puella Magi Madoka Magica: Rebellion (Note: 劇場版 魔法少女まどか☆マギカ[新編] 叛逆の物語 (Japanese: Gekijōban Mahō Shōjo Madoka Magika (Shinpen): Hangyaku no Monogatari)) is a 2013 Japanese animated dark fantasy action film produced by Aniplex and Shaft, based on the titular 2011 anime television series. It is a sequel to the films Beginnings and Eternal (2012), and is an all-new original work that was released in October 2013.

A manga adaptation illustrated by Hanokage was released by Houbunsha between November 2013 and January 2014. The film is distributed in North America by Aniplex of America. Rebellion was nominated for the Japan Academy Prize for Animation of the Year and won the Best Theatrical Film Award at the 19th Animation Kobe Awards.

A sequel film, titled Walpurgisnacht: Rising, premiered in Japanese theaters on August 28, 2026.

== Plot ==
In the seemingly carefree city of Mitakihara, a shy girl named Homura Akemi transfers into school and joins Madoka Kaname, Sayaka Miki, Mami Tomoe, and Kyoko Sakura, along with Mami's familiar, Bebe, as they become magical girls and fight against creatures known as "Nightmares" (ナイトメア, Naitomea). After they defeat a Nightmare embodiment of Hitomi Shizuki's frustrations over her relationship with Kyosuke, Homura realizes something is amiss in their memories. She and Kyoko realize they are trapped in a fake Mitakihara, which Homura recognizes as a witch's labyrinth. Homura proceeds to interrogate Bebe, remembering her to be the witch Charlotte, only to end up fighting Mami, who eventually also remembers they fought Wraiths, not Nightmares.

Homura is spirited away by Sayaka, while Mami is kept from pursuing them by Bebe, now taking her original form as a magical girl named Nagisa Momoe. Sayaka, revealing she possesses her full memories, warns Homura to reconsider uncovering the truth. Homura realizes that after Madoka's wish rewrote the universe, the only one who should remember the existence of witches and their labyrinths is herself. She reasons that she had fallen into despair over previously allowing Madoka to be erased from reality and had become a witch, generating the labyrinth around them. Kyubey confirms that after hearing Homura speak of a reality predating the Law of Cycles timeline, the Incubators isolated her Soul Gem from the rest of the universe in order to observe the Law of Cycles come into effect. As she fell into despair, a labyrinth in the form of a fake Mitakihara was created within Homura's Soul Gem, and subconsciously populated with people from Madoka's original life. While Kyubey admits that Madoka did appear, and was pulled into the isolated labyrinth, she seemed to be no more than a regular girl, and they decided to observe her until they devised the means to contain her. They wish to do away with the Law of Cycles so they can better amass energy from magical girls transforming into witches again.

Kyubey's intentions to control Madoka provoke Homura into fully transforming into the witch Homulilly. Homulilly directs her familiars to kill every Incubator within the labyrinth, while resolving to destroy herself rather than be saved and expose Madoka to the Incubators. Sayaka and Nagisa are both revealed to be reborn guardians who serve Madoka as part of the Law of Cycles. They rally the others to help save Homura from herself, and help destroy the barrier imprisoning Homura's Soul Gem. Madoka reaches Homura and together they destroy the barrier, freeing Homura's Soul Gem and destroying the remaining Incubators. Now reconnected to the universe and to her powers and memories as the Law of Cycles, Madoka moves to cleanse Homura of her despair and bring her into the higher plane.

Before Madoka can cleanse Homura, Homura suddenly grabs her and separates Madoka into two forms, severing Madoka's humanity from her Law of Cycles form. Homura reveals that what corrupted her Soul Gem was not despair, but rather love. Her Soul Gem changes shape. She unleashes this power across the universe and rewrites the cosmos into a reality where Madoka and all their friends will forget what has happened and return to the lives they led before the events of the series, while Homura herself will assume control over the design of their universe. Homura then transcends her own mortal existence and announces herself as a "demon", a being who brought down the "god" Madoka and returned her to a mortal girl. She punishes the Incubators by assigning them to bear the weight of the collective curses of the world, and also accepts that she may become Madoka's enemy if the latter should regain her memories and powers and oppose what Homura has done.

A post-credits scene shows Homura seated in a chair while watching over Mitakihara, with a badly-beaten-looking Incubator nearby. Homura dances with her new Soul Gem, then leans over a cliff and falls. Within the dark pupil of the Incubator's eye, the phrase "The End" appears in multiple languages in succession. A door bound by a ribbon appears, then disappears.

== Production ==
Rebellion is an original story which takes place following the events of the previous films. The film was released in Japanese theaters via Warner Bros. Pictures on October 26, 2013. Special skits featuring characters from the Monogatari series aired prior to the film, with a different skit shown during each week of its screening. The film was screened in North America by Aniplex of America in December 2013. The film was released on Blu-ray Disc and DVD with English subtitles on April 2, 2014, in Japan and was released by Aniplex of America as an import title in North America on April 8, 2014. Madman Anime (now Crunchyroll Pty. Ltd) released the film on Blu-ray Disc and DVD on April 8, 2014. A re-release with an English dub was released in North America on April 7, 2015.

The opening theme is "Colorful" (カラフル, Karafuru) by ClariS, which was released on October 30, 2013, and the ending theme is "Kimi no Gin no Niwa" (君の銀の庭; "Your Silver Garden") by Kalafina, which was released on November 6, 2013.

After the end of the original television series, writer Urobuchi and Aniplex producer Atsuhiro Iwakami separately decided that they wanted to do more with the story. Urobuchi started writing a scenario with no particular medium in mind, and Shaft president Kubota credited Iwakami with the idea of turning it into a film. The working title Urobuchi had given it was "Madoka 2", but the staff had not yet, at that point, decided on whether or not the film would be a sequel. Eventually, Iwakami made the decision to consider it a sequel. Urobuchi's original script for this sequel stood at around 70 minutes in length, but Shinbo asked him for 3 to 4 major revisions, mostly adding content, until it neared 2 hours. The animation troupe Gekidan Inu Curry, who were responsible for the alternate space designs and some script and storyboard revisions in the television series, returned for the films and were even more heavily involved than they were with the television series. The duo added dialogue for the character of Nagisa Momoe and also added scenes to the film, such as the intro "tea party" scene. Shinbo said that he tended to try and make aspects of his works more "unusual", but said that Gekidan Inu Curry's work was so amazing that it was not needed. Art director Ken Naitou from the previous films and the second half of the television series returned as the art director for the film, and supporting him and Gekidan Inu Curry was analog artist Youichi Nangou (from the same art company as Naitou, Studio Tulip), who had worked with Shinbo in the past on Twilight of the Dark Master. Commenting on the production, director of photography Shinichirou Etou from Shaft stated that the biggest challenge on the project was the incorporation of Gekidan Inu Curry's materials, but said that one of the film's unique circumstances was that all of the staff were working together to bring their images to life without compromise. Color designers Hitoshi Hibino and Izumi Takizawa (both from Shaft) split the work by having Hibino take on the main color design duties for the characters and Takizawa focusing on accessory designs and Gekidan Inu Curry's material.

The film was storyboarded by Shinsaku Sasaki, who had storyboarded a few episodes from the television series. Before he was asked to storyboard for the series, he had known about Shaft's identity as a studio with particular idiosyncrasies in their works and thought that the company's style and his own were too different for them to work together; but at some point, he was asked to join the project and found it to be interesting when he read the screenplay. He also thought that Urobuchi was a new and upcoming writer due to not knowing about his reputation as an author. For Rebellion, the scripts for the action scenes were relatively short, so Sasaki worked with Miyamoto in expanding them. His depiction of Homura was also much more negative, an aspect of which was later corrected by Shinbo and the other staff.

Miyamoto had originally intended to serve as the film's director and not act as a unit director processing any of the material himself, but all of the staff members that Shaft attempted to recruit for it and the compilation films were busy. For the compilation films, he was eventually joined by director Yuki Yase; and for Rebellion, he was joined by Hiroyuki Terao in the role of assistant director, but otherwise shared processing duties with Takashi Kawabata as it was evident that he would be unable to finish the film on his own. Miyamoto worried about whether the rough edges of the film would show in the final product, but Shaft's visual effects artist Motoki Sakai jokingly reassured Miyamoto that he could simply overwhelm the screen and audience with effects. On the animation side, Junichirou Taniguchi and Hiroki Yamamura reprised their roles from the compilation film (and in Taniguchi's case, from the television series) as chief animation directors. Taniguchi also invited Takashi Hashimoto to work on the film and he was given the role of effects animation director. Assistant director Terao drew the rough effects under the director's instructions and then Hashimoto cleaned them up and drew them as was needed. Two especially important animators on the film were Yuuya Geshi and Kouichi Kikuta who, although not hired as such, were eventually given "main animator" credits due to the extensive number of cuts the two drew across the entire film. Kikuta did not find out he had received the credit until after production had finished when he was told by unit director Kawabata. Hashimoto used the animation work he saw from Kikuta, Geshi, and Shaft's Genichirou Abe as yardsticks for his own work.

On the production side, animation producer Tadao Iwaki did not return for either the compilation films or Rebellion. Yasuhiro Okada, who had only recently joined Shaft by the time, was selected as the animation producer in Iwaki's place. Okada had never worked on a theatrical film as a producer before, and Shaft had its own method of animation production that was unique to the studio and had not established a film-like production system. As such, he did not know how to approach the production aspect of the film and asked various people for advice, but due to the studio's system found it mostly unhelpful. Instead, Okada opted to create a system for the studio to work with. Rather than work on multiple units (parts, listed in alphabetical order; in the case of Rebellion, A through E) of the film at once like in a standard production, Okada decided to work on each unit in order. He also did not intend to hire many animators for the work and wanted to complete it with a smaller number of elite animators with the idea that Miyamoto, whom he considered to be the most capable of expressing the kinds of images that Shinbo wanted, could oversee all of the cuts. Okada's production method was smooth up until the end of the C-part. Taniguchi mentioned that there was a delay between the C and D parts; and as the schedule became tighter, the team had to recruit more staff to complete the film on time.

- Puella Magi Madoka Magica: Rebellion
- Manga

Puella Magi Madoka Magica: Rebellion
- Written by: Gen Urobuchi
- Illustrated by: Hanokage
- Published by: Houbunsha
- English publisher: NA: Yen Press
- Imprint: Manga Time KR Comics
- Original run: November 12, 2013 – January 10, 2014
- Volumes: 3

== Other media ==
A manga adaptation of Rebellion illustrated by Hanokage, who previously did the television series' manga adaptation and The Different Story spin-off manga, was published by Houbunsha in three tankōbon volumes between November 12, 2013, and January 10, 2014. Yen Press began releasing the series in English starting December 15, 2015.

== Reception ==
Rebellion was nominated for the Japan Academy Prize for Animation of the Year at the 37th Japan Academy Prize; and won the Best Theatrical Film Award at the 19th Animation Kobe Awards. The film also received a Notable Entry Award at the 13th Tokyo Anime Award Festival in 2014. Rebellion was one of 19 animated films submitted for Best Animated Feature for the 86th Academy Awards, but was not nominated.

Jacob Hope Chapman of Anime News Network gave Rebellion a B rating, praising its story, symbolism and characters, writing "Gorgeous and mind-bendingly creative, far more fascinating and entertaining than it had any reason to be, works very hard to justify its grand shift in theme". Richard Eisenbeis and Toshi Nakamura at Kotaku reviewed the film positively. Toshi's final thoughts being, "I loved everything else about the movie. It plays with your emotions like crazy, but at the same time, it's emotionally fluid. While you might not agree with characters' choices and actions, they all make sense and are never forced." Richard's final thoughts were, "Personally, I loved it. It's a great character piece and a worthy addition to the franchise". Geoff Berkshire of Variety gave a good review, stating "Rebellion delivers a convoluted conclusion sure to prove beyond baffling to any franchise newcomers." Berkshire praised other aspects such as the visuals of Gekidan Inu Curry.

=== Accolades ===
Year	Name of Competition	Category	Result	Recipient	Ref.
2014	37th Japan Academy Prize	Animation of the Year	Nominated	Rebellion	
2014	13th Tokyo Anime Award	Anime of the Year (Notable Entry in the Film Category)	Won	Rebellion	
2014	19th Animation Kobe	Theatrical Film Award	Won	Rebellion	
2015	UK Anime Network Awards 2015	Best Action Anime	Nominated	Rebellion	

== See also ==
- List of films featuring time loops

== Notes ==
=== Works cited ===
- Kizawa, Yukito; Takayama, Atsushi; Saitou, Fusano, eds. (2014). 劇場版魔法やまどかマギカ[新編]叛逆の物語公式ガイドブック only you. [Movie Version Puella Magi Madoka Magica [New Edition] Story of Rebellion Official Guidebook only you.]. Houbunsha. ISBN 978-4832244290.
- Magica Quartet (2021). 魔法少女まどか☆マギカ 10th Anniversary Book Vol. 2 [Puella Magi Madoka Magica 10th Anniversary Book Volume 2]. Houbunsha. ISBN 978-4832273108.
