= BIGLOBE =

Internet service provider in Japan

BIGLOBE Inc. ビッグローブ株式会社
- Type: Kabushiki gaisha
- Industry: Information and communication industry
- Founded: July 3, 2006
- Headquarters: Shinagawa, Tokyo, Japan
- Key people: Saburo Takizawa, General Manager
- Revenue: 104 billion yen
- Owner: NEC (1986-2014); Japan Industrial Partners (2014-2017); KDDI (2017-)
- Number of employees: 500
- Website: www.biglobe.co.jp

BIGLOBE (ビッグローブ) (combination of the words "big" and "globe") is a Japanese internet service provider.

KDDI acquired the company in January 2017 for 80 billion yen, which made it the second-largest provider of fiber optics internet connections in Japan.

Since its foundation, NEC transferred most of the related PC Engine trademarks, including games published by NEC Home Electronics in Japan to NEC BIGLOBE. As of July 2023, the trademark is jointly owned by BIGLOBE and Konami, who inherited the trademark rights from Hudson Soft before being self-absorbed into Konami themselves in March 2012. This did not include the rights of NEC Avenue and NEC Interchannel games for the system, which was previously owned by Lightweight and is currently owned by M2.

== See also ==
- Comparison of web search engines
- List of search engines
- Timeline of web search engines
