= Ume Aoki =

Japanese manga artist

- 蒼樹 うめ
- Born: August 3, 1981 (age 45); Hyōgo Prefecture, Japan
- Education: Musashino Art University
- Occupations: Manga artist, illustrator
- Writing career
- Genre: Fiction

Ume Aoki (Japanese: 蒼樹 うめ, Hepburn: Aoki Ume; born August 3, 1981) is a Japanese manga artist, illustrator, animator, voice actress, and dōjin artist from Hyōgo Prefecture. She officially romanizes her name as aokiume. She illustrates under the pennames apricot+ for many of her dōjinshi, and Apply Fujimiya (藤宮 アプリ, Fujimiya Apuri) for the visual novel Sanarara.

Aoki provided the voice for her Metapod persona in the Shaft anime adaptation of her four-panel comic strip Hidamari Sketch. She later created the original character designs for Puella Magi Madoka Magica, a Shaft anime production; and has been involved with the franchise—spanning several films, mobile games, manga, novels, and further television anime series—since then.

== Works ==
- Hidamari Sketch (2004–present; original manga published in Manga Time Kirara Carat) – Voice of 'Ume-sensei' in anime adaptation
- Sanarara (2005) – Character design, artwork
- Tetsunagi Kooni (てつなぎこおに; lit. Hand Holding Little Demon) (2006–present; original manga published in Dragon Age Pure)
- Puella Magi Madoka Magica (2011–present) – Original character design
- Mado no Mukōgawa (マドの向こう側; lit. The Other Side of the Window) (2012–present; original manga published in Manga Time Kirara Carino)
- Binetsu Kūkan (微熱空間; lit. Feverish Atmosphere) (2014–present; manga published in Hakusensha's Rakuen (Le Paradis))
- Magia Record: Puella Magi Madoka Magica Side Story (2017–2024) – Original character design
