= Love Songs =

Love Songs may refer to:

== Film ==
- Love Songs (1930 film), a French-German musical
- Love Songs (1984 film) or Paroles et Musique, a French-Canadian film
- Love Songs (1999 film), a television film starring Louis Gossett Jr.
- Love Songs (2007 film), a French film directed by Christophe Honoré

== Music ==
=== Albums ===
- Love Songs (Anne Sofie von Otter and Brad Mehldau album), 2010
- Love Songs (Ayumi Hamasaki album), 2010
- Love Songs (Babyface album), 2001
- Love Songs (Barbra Streisand album), 1981
- Love Songs (Barry White album), 2003
- Love Songs (Beatles album), 1977
- Love Songs (Bee Gees album), 2005
- Love Songs (Billy Ray Cyrus album), 2008
- Love Songs (The Carpenters album), 1997
- Love Songs (Chicago album), 2005
- Love Songs (Cliff Richard album), 1981
- Love Songs (Dan Fogelberg album), 1995
- Love Songs (David Sanborn album), 1995
- Love Songs (Destiny's Child album), 2013
- Love Songs (Diane Schuur album), 1993
- Love Songs (Don Walker album), 2026
- Love Songs (Earth, Wind & Fire album), 2004
- Love Songs (Elton John album), 1995
- Love Songs (Frank Sinatra album), 2001
- Love Songs (Gipsy Kings album), 1996
- Love Songs (Glen Campbell album), 2000
- Love Songs (Harry Watters album), 2005
- Love Songs (Heart album), 2006
- Love Songs (Jennifer Love Hewitt album), 1992
- Love Songs (John Farnham album), 2002
- Love Songs (Johnny Gill album), 2005
- Love Songs (Julio Iglesias album), 2004
- Love Songs (Mariah Carey album), 2010
- Love Songs (Michael Franks album), 2004
- Love Songs (Michael Jackson album), 2002
- Love Songs (Miles Davis album), 1999
- Love Songs (Nat King Cole album), 2003
- Love Songs (Neil Sedaka album), 2005
- Love Songs (Rick Astley album), 2004
- Love Songs (Santana album), 2004
- Love Songs (Tina Turner album), 2014
- Love Songs (Trisha Yearwood album), 2008
- Love Songs (UB40 album), 2009
- Love Songs (Vanessa Williams album), 2004
- Love Songs (Whitesnake album), 2020
- Love Songs (Willie Nelson album), 1986
- Love Songs (Yanni album), 1999
- Love Songs: A Compilation... Old and New, by Phil Collins, 2004
- Love Songs – Koi Uta, by Shion Miyawaki, 2009
- Love Songs, by Aretha Franklin, 2001
- Love Songs, by Billy Nicholls, 1974
- Love Songs, by Bobby Vinton, 2003
- Love Songs, a compilation album by Collin Raye, 2000
- Love Songs, a compilation album by Diana Ross, 1984
- Love Songs, by George Earth, 2004
- Love Songs, by the Jean-Paul Sartre Experience, 1986
- Love Songs, a compilation album by John Michael Montgomery, 2002
- Love Songs, by Jordan Knight, 2006
- Love Songs, by Kenny Rogers, 1997 and 2002
- Love Songs, by Michael Jackson and Diana Ross, 1987
- Love Songs, by Natalie Cole, 2001
- Love Songs, by Peter Yarrow, 1975
- Love Songs, by the Soldiers, 2010
- Love Songs, by Vanessa Paradis, 2013

=== Songs ===
- "Love Songs" (Daryl Braithwaite song), 2020
- "Love Songs" (Kaash Paige song), 2018
- "Lovesongs (They Kill Me)", by Cinema Bizarre, 2007
- "Love Songs", by Benjamin Ingrosso from Identification, 2018

=== Performers ===
- Love Songs, an American punk band led by Craig Billmeier

== Arts and entertainment ==
- Love Songs, a 1972 novel by Lawrence Sanders
- "Love Songs", a 2005–2007 art installation by Mary Kelly

== Other uses ==
- Lovesongs (Luther Vandross album), 2009

== See also ==
- Greatest Love Songs (disambiguation)
- Love Song (disambiguation)
- The Love Songs (disambiguation)
- Song of Love (disambiguation)
- Love Thongs, or Stay Black, a 2016 EP by Damien Done
