= Love Ballad =

Love Ballad may refer to:

- "Love Ballad" (L.T.D. song), 1976, covered by several performers
- "Love Ballad" (Tove Lo song), 2012
- "Love Ballad", a song by Brown Eyed Soul
- "A Love Ballad", a song by Bo Burnham from Bo Burnham
- Ballad, a form of verse, often a narrative set to music
- Love song, a song about falling or being in love

== See also ==
- Ballad (disambiguation)
- Love Song (disambiguation)
- Song of Love (disambiguation)
