= The Love Songs =

The Love Songs may refer to:

- The Love Songs (Andy Williams album), 1997
- The Love Songs (Chris de Burgh album), 1997
- The Love Songs (Clint Black album), 2007
- The Love Songs (Peter Hammill album), 1984
- Truly: The Love Songs, a 1997 compilation album by Lionel Richie
- The Love Songs, a compilation album by Dionne Warwick, 1989
- The Love Songs, a compilation album by Westlife, 2014

== See also ==
- Love Song (disambiguation)
- Love Songs (disambiguation)
