= List of Angels of Death episodes =

Angels of Death
- Starring: Haruka Chisuga; Nobuhiko Okamoto; Takahiro Sakurai; Natsumi Fujiwara; Mariya Ise; Hōchū Ōtsuka
- No. of episodes: 16 (Note: The last four episodes were distributed online due to the series running out of television broadcast slots.)

Release
- Original network: AT-X, Tokyo MX, KBS, TVA, SUN, BS11, TVQ
- Original release: July 6 – October 26, 2018

Angels of Death is a horror anime television series based on the video game of the same name created by Hoshikuzu KRNKRN (Makoto Sanada). The 16-episode anime series was produced by J.C.Staff and premiered on July 6, 2018. The anime was directed by Kentarō Suzuki with scripts overseen by Yoshinobu Fujioka, music composed by Noisycroak at Lantis and character designs handled by Miki Matsumoto, who also served as chief animation director. Masaaki Endoh performed the opening theme titled "Vital," while Haruka Chisuga performed the ending theme titled "Pray" under her character name Rachel. The series streamed on Crunchyroll with English subtitles, and Funimation with an English dub.

== Episodes ==
No.	Title	Directed by (Note: Information is taken from the ending credits of each episode.)	Storyboarded by	Original release date
1	"Kill me... please."	Masahiro Shinohara	Kentarō Suzuki	July 6, 2018
After witnessing a murder, 13-year-old Rachel "Ray" Gardner is sent to a hospital for counselling only to wake up in an unfamiliar building with no memory of how she got there. There, the only way out is through an elevator, where a machine-generated voice over an intercom decrees her as a "sacrifice" for the inhabitants of the upper floors. As Ray heads upwards from her current floor of B7 to B6, she encounters an insane, bandaged man wielding a scythe and barely escapes death, managing to find another elevator that heads up to B5. On B5, she reunites with Daniel "Danny" Dickens, her counselor, although it is soon clear that Danny is not trustworthy as he mainly talks about Ray's blue eyes, and is crazily obsessed with them. When Ray attempts to escape, Danny locked the door as he has anticipated her distrust. As he corners her, threatening to take out her eyes, Danny tells Ray that she will be reunited with her parents in hell. This statement seems to evoke Ray's lost memories, and Danny stops to ask her to stay with him forever. However, he is cut short when the man with the scythe cuts him through the gut, and is about to kill Ray, but finds her no longer afraid to be killed. The intercom designates the man as a "new sacrifice" for violating a rule of leaving his designated floor and attacking an inhabitant of another. As the man attempts to flee, Ray approaches him and asks him to kill her.
2	"Your grave is not here."	Takayuki Chiba	Kentarō Suzuki	July 13, 2018
Realising that he will need Ray's intelligence to escape the building, the man introduces himself as Zack, claiming that he is an idiot and that if Ray helped him out of the building, he would kill her. The two travel up to B4, a place entirely made out of stone and modeled after a graveyard, with graves for them as well. The two split up to investigate the area. Ray explores and finds a library containing records of every "sacrifice" in the building as well as a mysterious letter promising her that the writer knows her true wish. Flipping through the records, she finds Zack's real name to be Isaac Foster, an infamous serial killer that used to roam the deserted alleyways in search of victims. Meanwhile, as Zack destroys gravestones out of boredom, he accidentally activates a switch allowing Ray to proceed further into the building. Ray soon returns, and reveals that she has learned about his past. However, instead of being afraid like Zack has expected, Ray simply reminds Zack her wish to be killed. Proceeding their way, they are confronted by a boy wearing a pumpkin mask.
3	"I swear to God."	Kazunobu Shimizu	Susumu Hiroo	July 20, 2018
The boy, Edward "Eddie" Mason, reveals himself to be the inhabitant of B4 and wants to kill and bury Ray after having fallen in love with her at first sight. After a brief skirmish, Eddie flees and finds Ray, offering to grant her wish for death. However, Ray hesitates when she realizes that Zack won't be able to escape if she dies. Following her through the opening, Zack manages to track down the two and swears to God on their promise, immediately convincing Ray to side with him. Furious at her rejection, Eddie switches off the lights and attempts to use the darkness of his floor to his advantage to kill, but Ray thwarts his plans and steals his remote control. With the lights back on, Zack easily kills Eddie and buries him in the grave originally meant for Ray. The two proceed on the elevator up to floor B3, where they enter a prison-like environment.
4	"A sinner has no right of choice."	Yuki Morita	Kentarō Suzuki	July 27, 2018
Ray and Zack discover that B3 is controlled by Catherine "Cathy" Ward, a sadistic prison warden who forces the pair through various obstacles and booby traps as punishment for their crimes. In the first room they enter, Zack accidentally traps himself in an electric chair and is repeatedly shocked, with Cathy giving Ray a hint on how to rescue him. Ray figures out that the dummies in the room are controlling the chair. Upon destroying the dummies, Zack is freed and the door to the next room is unlocked. They enter and are trapped in a gas chamber slowly filling with poison gas. Cathy explains they must solve a puzzle to escape and they have one gas mask to share, but they have a limited time before she releases an even deadlier poison gas that renders the mask useless. Ray seemingly solves the first stage of the puzzle by balancing a scale, but she begins to succumb to the gas as the time limit runs out.
5	"Don't let me kill you just yet."	Yūsuke Onoda	Iku Suzuki	August 3, 2018
Ray notices that an air vent has opened and Zack boosts her up to reach it, allowing her to recover a keycard. However, in his haste to open the door, Zack breaks the card just as time runs out and the second gas begins to be pumped into the room. Ray deduces the flammable properties of the gas, creating a spark that triggers an explosion to destroy the door. Despite their escape, the two are weakened by the gas and decide to rest, where Zack recalls a dream from his childhood when he lived under abusive caretakers. When they proceed to the next room, he is forced to relive his childhood through a dollhouse puzzle mimicking his past, further agitating him. The obstacle the next room holds finally cracks Zack, involving two syringes: one being harmless and the other containing a dangerous hallucinatory drug. As he injects both into himself to spare Ray, Zack's past returns to haunt him, causing him to become more aggressive and threatening to kill Ray. Her reminder of the oath finally forces Zack to calm himself down and reaffirms it.
6	"Zack is the only one who can kill me."	Ei Tanaka & Kouhei Hatano	Sega Kajii	August 10, 2018
In a flashback, it is revealed that Zack murdered his abusive caretakers after being inspired by a horror slasher movie. In the present, Zack begins succumbing to the drug again and Ray is chased into the final room of the floor where Cathy herself is. In exhilaration, Cathy gives Ray a gun and suggests she kill Zack with it. Barely managing to get a hold of himself, Zack encourages Ray but she refuses, telling him that it's their choice to kill or be killed. Impressed by her words, Zack stabs himself to uphold their oath, angering Cathy who exits her safe room to inspect his body. Upon finding that he is still alive, she gleefully promises to torture him to death and threatens Ray with a machine-controlled gun installed on the ceiling, revealing that the gun she had given her was unloaded the whole time. Instead, Ray calmly takes out another fully loaded gun hidden in her bag and shoots Cathy in the stomach. This momentary distraction weakens her and lets Zack regain sufficient consciousness to deal the finishing blow. Ray and Zack proceed to the elevator, where Ray reveals she was in counseling after witnessing a murder when Zack collapses from his wounds.
7	"Who are you?"	Nana Harada & Risako Yoshida	Kouhei Hatano	August 17, 2018
The two proceed to the elevator, but Zack collapses from his wounds and is slowly bleeding to death. This forces Ray to keep moving ahead alone in hopes of finding anything that can heal him, meeting a priest named Abraham Gray on his floor modeled after a church complex. Gray and Ray make a deal whereby he will lead her back down to B5, Danny's floor, which stores the necessary medical gear, and in the process be allowed to let her go through a test to judge her character. Just before doing so, she promises Zack to retrieve a knife from his floor as well. Following Gray down to Cathy's floor again, Ray is instructed to restore power to the elevator in order to proceed further, and while beside him smells a strange bewitchingly sweet gas emanating from him. Journeying through the jail cells again, she is attacked by Cathy's zombie-like prisoners, now set free in her absence. Ray flees to the control room, activating Cathy's fire armament and booby traps to eliminate them.
8	"Yeah..., I 'm a monster."	Shigeki Awai & Yūsuke Onoda	Toru Yoshida	August 24, 2018
Ray is shocked to find Cathy's body missing, and is taunted by a hallucination of Cathy praising her as an exemplary sinner for her coldheartedness. They continue down to Eddie's floor, where Ray ruthlessly crushes screaming stuffed hands emerging from the upturned graves to activate the elevator, referring them as simply doll hands. Like Cathy, Eddie's grave is upturned and his body is missing, and Ray is once again taunted by a hallucination of Eddie who questions her lack of compassion. Gray expresses discomfort at Ray actions all the while observing her in each floor. Finally, they reach Danny's floor, only for Ray to discover in a panic that all the medicine and Danny's body are missing. With no other choice, she follows Gray back to Zack's floor. Meanwhile, back on B2, Zack has a continued dream of his childhood where he murdered another passing woman after his caretakers. Taken in by a kind old blind man, Zack tries to sate his urge to kill by murdering a random man in hopes that the blind man would fear him. However, the man merely leaves to buy more food, and Zack soon discovers that the blind man was murdered by a pair of gleeful muggers. Realising that destroying people's happiness was satisfying for him, Zack kills the pair and declares that he is a monster. Danny then approaches the unconscious Zack and wonders if he should kill him.
9	"There is no God in this World."	Hiroshi Kawashima & Naoki Murata	Hiroshi Kawashima	August 31, 2018
Danny tells the now-awake Zack how he survived using body armour and fake blood, offering medicine to Zack in return for him gouging out Ray's eyes. Zack refuses, and Danny takes his leave. Meanwhile, Ray finds Zack's knife in a makeshift bedroom, and upon observing the room realizes that she still knows nothing about him. Journeying back up to Gray's floor, the priest questions Ray's motives and concludes that she is a selfish witch who causes misfortune to those around her, additionally demeaning Ray's firm belief in her God. Distressed, she flees and reunites with Zack, deciding to follow Danny's trail of blood to get medicine. On the way, Zack is forced to fight off a giant snake, sapping his strength even further. Gathering her courage, Ray decides to chase after Danny alone, and Zack gives her his knife for protection.
10	"The witch trial shall start."	Ei Tanaka & Kouhei Hatano	Kentarō Suzuki	September 7, 2018
Ray runs into Gray, who reveals that he has confiscated the medicine Danny was carrying. The scene shifts to a courtroom with Gray presiding as the judge over a witch trial to determine her identity, with the hallucinations of Danny, Eddie and Cathy to testify against her. Cathy points out that Ray is hiding a lying heart under her calm facade, Eddie laments that Ray is selfish, and Danny boasts of her corrupted soul that is beyond saving. With all the testimonies against her, Gray declares Ray a witch and sentences her to be burned at the stake.
11	"'cause you are my God, Zack."	Masahiro Yamashita	Shinji Itadaki	September 14, 2018
As Ray is about to burn in the fire, she reflects on her relationship with Zack, and finally comes to conclusion that he is her God -- the one who had always helped and saved her when she needed it most. Cutting herself with his knife, Ray successfully returns to the present, deducing that Gray has been using drugs to create illusions on his floor. With death threats, Gray surrenders and gifts her the medicine, which Ray uses to stop the bleeding, disinfect the wound, and stitch it up, declaring her realization to him. As they proceed to the final floor B1, Zack reveals that his mother's lover set him on fire, resulting in him sustaining burns all over his body that had to be covered up with bandages, and his mother selling him off to an illegal orphanage that trafficked children. Ray attempts to tell him a secret of hers as well, but cannot bring herself to in fear that he will hate her for lying to him all this time. The elevator finally stops at B1, a dimly lit house with grey furnishings.
12	"Try to know everything about Her."	Kazunobu Shimizu	Rei Nakahara & Toru Yoshida	September 21, 2018
Zack heads deeper into the floor, opening a room at the end of the corridor filled with fake flowers and the corpses of a couple unnaturally stitched together with thread. Ray begins to go hysterical, begging him to kill her, before fainting. Danny then arrives suddenly and locks Zack out of the room, offering to unlock it only if he can fully explore the floor and find out Ray's past. Zack reluctantly begins exploring the floor, managing to fight his way through various death traps only to fall into a hole filled with sharp spikes. Saved by Gray, the priest explains that he controls the entire building as an experimental facility to study and observe those who claim to believe in God, with those placed in B7 as "sacrifices" that are to be judged by the "angels" on each floor. Deciding to place some interest in their relationship, he provides Zack with a clue on how to proceed, allowing him to enter Ray's room. A recorded news report details the murders of Mr. and Mrs. Gardner, a couple in wedlock whose bodies had been mutilated badly with bullet and knife wounds and were stitched together. Meanwhile, their daughter Ray was found completely unharmed even though a week had passed after their deaths, implying that she murdered her parents.
13	"I'm not Your God."	Nana Harada & Shigeki Awai	Kouhei Hatano & Osamu Tadokoro	October 5, 2018
Zack continues watching a recording of an interview between Danny and Ray, where Ray reveals that her parents were abusive and hated her and each other. One night, her father finally snapped and stabbed her mother to death, prompting her to take her mother's gun and shoot her father to death. Afterwards, she stitched their bodies together in order to create the "perfect family" and lived happily with them until the police arrived. Noticing her blank, blue eyes, Danny reveals to Ray that his mother committed suicide due to him having been born missing an eye, and he becomes obsessed with Ray since her eyes resemble his mother's. Angry and disgusted, Zack storms back to where Ray and Danny are and proclaims his suspicions that Ray is in fact the "angel" of B1, which Danny confirms, and reveals that Ray was sent to B7 after finding newfound faith in God by reading a Bible. Knowing that she lied to him, Zack angrily declares that he is not Ray's God. Disillusioned, Ray brought out her reloaded gun and shot Zack, but missed. Ray flees, luring Zack through more traps until he manages to corner her in the last room. He once again asks her if she intends to kill him when Danny arrives and holds him a gunpoint. Cornered by the two of them, Ray then calmly draws her gun and fires.
14	"Swear you will be killed by me."	Hiroshi Kawashima & Yūsuke Onoda	Hidetoshi Namura & Kouhei Hatano	October 12, 2018
Ray shoots Danny much to his surprise, claiming that Zack is hers to kill and sew up. However, she remains conflicted since she has lost her faith in her God, meaning there is nobody left to forgive her for her crimes, and hesitates in shooting Zack. Pushing her down, Zack reminds Ray that he is the one who made the promise to kill her, not her God, shaking Ray back to her senses. The two swear to each other again on their vow and attempt to continue their way out. Although B1 is Ray's floor, she is unaware of its location even after knowing every nook and cranny of the place, deducing that the exit must be on B2 due to her floor being the last to be built and the strange observation that no one ever came down from above. While on the way to reactivate the elevator, she encounters Gray, with questions her intentions and her identity, telling him that she has accepted herself and will hence take responsibility for her own actions and choices from now on. Satisfied with her answer, Gray gives her a hint that the exit is behind the huge stained glass window of his floor. When Zack and Ray reunite, they try to find her gun as well but realize Danny's body is missing once again and that Ray's gun has been destroyed. Together they warily return to B2, where Zack smashes through the stained glass window to reveal a long flight of stairs leading to the surface. Just then, the building's self-destruct sequence is initiated.
15	"A vow cannot be stolen."	Kouhei Hatano & Naoki Murata	Kentarō Suzuki	October 19, 2018
Ray and Zack flee up the stairs as the facility begins to burn and collapse, but their way is blocked by steel bars. Zack briefly has a panic attack due to his fear of fire, but he manages to regain his senses upon seeing Ray struggling to break the bars. Overcoming his fear, Zack manages to break through the bars and all other obstacles, though he breaks his scythe in the process. They finally reach the top floor, where Ray asks Zack if he truly wants to kill her, and she wouldn't fault him if he changed his mind. Zack reaffirms the promise he made when Danny arrives and shoots Ray in the back. He reveals he was the one who activated the self-destruct sequence and holds Zack at gunpoint to watch Ray die, so he will have to live with the knowledge he couldn't fulfill his promise. Ray assures Zack that she doesn't care if their vow is fulfilled or not, only that the vow was made in the first place, and she will carry the burden of their vow so Zack doesn't need to think of himself as a liar. Jealous of Ray's affection for Zack, Danny shoots Ray again and prepares to kill Zack when Gray disables him with a crossbow. Grey orders Zack to leave through the exit, assuring him there is still a chance to save Ray. Zack picks up Ray's body and heads for the door with Danny still pointing his gun at his back.
16	"Stop crying and smile."	Kazunobu Shimizu & Kentarō Suzuki	Kouhei Hatano & Toru Yoshida	October 26, 2018
Gray shoots Danny again to prevent him from shooting Zack. As Zack carries Ray through the exit, Gray has a final conversation with Danny, revealing that he became fascinated with how Ray and Zack managed to change each other, and how he's come to realize that everybody is a human, both flawed and beautiful. The building then collapses, presumably killing both Danny and Gray. Zack is able to reach the surface just as the police arrive to investigate the building collapse, surrendering to the police so Ray can be taken to a hospital. After recovering from her wounds, Ray is taken to a mental care facility where the staff attempt to rehabilitate her with limited success. Deemed guilty for his murder spree as well as killing Ray's parents and kidnapping her, Ray is informed that Zack is sentenced to death. However, shortly after hearing the news, Zack breaks into Ray's room to fulfill their oath, having escaped prison. As they both leap out of the window to escape, Ray once again pleads for Zack to kill her, which Zack reaffirms by telling her to stop crying and smile. By the time the police arrive, the room is already empty with a splatter of blood on the windowsill and Zack's knife on the floor.
