= Ai no Uta =

Ai no Uta, "Love Song" in Japanese, may refer to:

- Ai no Uta (album), by Ai Nonaka, 2006

== Songs ==
- "Ai no Uta" (Koda Kumi song), 2007
- "Ai no Uta" (Strawberry Flower song), 2001
- "Ai no Uta (Words of Love)", by Haruka Chisuga, 2016
- "Swallowtail Butterfly (Ai no Uta)", by Yen Town Band, 1996
- "Ai no Uta", by Angela Aki from Today, 2007
- "Ai no Uta", by Buck-Tick from Mona Lisa Overdrive, 2003
- "Ai no Uta", by Do As Infinity from True Song, 2002
- "Ai no Uta", by Eiko Shimamiya from Ozone, 2003
- "Ai no Uta", by Every Little Thing from Many Pieces, 2003
- "Ai no Uta", by Hitomi Shimatani from Flare, 2007
- "Ai no Uta", by Miki Imai, 2005
- "Ai no Uta", by Misia from Marvelous, 2001
- "Ai no Uta", by Nanase Aikawa, 2004
- "Ai no Uta", by Psycho le Cemu from Frontiers, 2003
- "Ai no Uta", by Something Else, 1999
- "Ai no Uta", by Tanpopo from the single "Motto"
- "Ai no Uta", by Yui Sakakibara, 2007
- "Ai no Uta", by Mai Fukui, from the TV series Koizora
- 愛の詩 (Ai no Uta), by LamazeP (ft. Hatsune Miku)
