= Love Song =

A love song is a song about being in love.

Love Song, Lovesong or A Love Song may also refer to:

== Film, television and theatre ==
=== Film ===
- Love Song (1954 film), an Italian film directed by Giorgio Simonelli
- Love Song, a 1985 film starring Maurice Denham and Constance Cummings
- Love Song (2000 film), an MTV movie starring Monica
- Love Song, a 2001 Japanese film starring Nakama Yukie
- Lovesong, a 2001 non-narrative short film by Stan Brakhage
- Lovesong (film), a 2016 American drama
- A Love Song (film), a 2022 American drama

=== Television ===
- Love Song (TV series), a 2016 Japanese drama series
- The Love Song (TV series), a 2016 Taiwanese romance series
- "Love Song", a 1954 episode of The Motorola Television Hour

=== Theatre ===
- Love Song, a 2006 play by John Kolvenbach
- The Love Song (operetta), a 1925 operetta with lyrics by Harry B. Smith

== Literature ==
- Lovesong (novel), a 2009 novel by Alex Miller
- Love Song: The Lives of Kurt Weill and Lotte Lenya, a 2012 dual biography by Ethan Mordden

== Music ==
- Love Song (band), an American Christian rock band, or their self-titled album

=== Albums ===
- Love Song (Anne Murray album), 1974
- Love Song (Gary Bartz album) or the title song, 1977
- Love Song (Riya album) or the title song, 2005

=== Songs ===
- "Lovesong" (Amiel song), 2003
- "Love Song" (BigBang song), 2011
- "Lovesong" (The Cure song), 1989; covered by 311 (2004)
- "Love Song" (The Damned song), 1979
- "Love Song" (Justin Bieber song), 2025
- "Love Song" (Luna Sea song), 2000
- "Love Song" (M-Flo song), 2006
- "Love Song" (The Oak Ridge Boys song), 1983
- "Love Song" (Sara Bareilles song), 2007
- "Love Song" (Simple Minds song), 1981
- "Love Song" (Sky song), 1999
- "Love Song" (Tesla song), 1989
- "A Love Song" (Lee Greenwood song), 1982; covered by Kenny Rogers (1982)
- "A Love Song" (Loggins and Messina song), 1973; covered by Anne Murray (1973)
- "The Love Song" (Jeff Bates song), 2002
- "The Love Song" (k-os song), 2005
- "The Love Song" (Miroslav Žbirka song) ("V slepých uličkách"), 1981
- "Loveeeeeee Song", by Rihanna, featuring Future, 2012
- "Love Song", by Alice in Chains from Sap, 1992
- "Love Song", by Angus & Julia Stone from the video game Life Is Strange: True Colors, 2021
- "Love Song", by Ayumi Hamasaki from Love Songs, 2010
- "Love Song", by Beach Bunny from Emotional Creature, 2022
- "Love Song", by Blue Café, representing Poland in the Eurovision Song Contest 2004
- "Love Song", by the Dandy Warhols from ...Earth to the Dandy Warhols..., 2008
- "Love Song", by Five for Fighting from Message for Albert, 1997
- "Love Song", by J. P. Amedori from the film Stick It, 2006
- "Love Song", by Korn from See You on the Other Side, 2005
- "Love Song", by Kristine W from Land of the Living, 1996
- "Love Song", by Lana Del Rey, from Norman Fucking Rockwell!, 2019
- "Love Song", by Lesley Duncan from Sing Children Sing, 1968
- "Love Song", by Lucky Twice, 2010
- "Love Song", by Madonna and Prince, from Like a Prayer, 1989
- "Love Song", by Pink from Try This, 2003
- "Love Song", by Rain from Back to the Basic, 2010
- "Love Song", by Syd Barrett from Barrett, 1970
- "Love Song", by Third Day from Third Day, 1996
- "Love Song", by Tilly and the Wall from Bottoms of Barrels, 2006
- "Love Song", by Tommy James, 1972
- "Love Song", by Vixen from Live & Learn, 2006
- "Love Song", by Why Don't We from The Good Times and the Bad Ones, 2021
- "Love Song (Oh Jene)", by AC/DC from High Voltage, 1975
- "Lovesong", by Beabadoobee from Beatopia, 2022
- "Lovesong", by Rasmus Seebach, 2019
- "A Love Song", by Amanda Blank from I Love You, 2009
- "A Love Song", by Ladyhawke from Wild Things, 2016
- "The Love Song", by Marilyn Manson from Holy Wood (In the Shadow of the Valley of Death), 2000

== Paintings ==
- The Love Song, a 1717 painting by Antoine Watteau
- Love Song (Giorgio de Chirico) or The Song of Love, a 1914 painting by Giorgio de Chirico
- The Love Song (Rockwell), a 1926 painting by Norman Rockwell

== See also ==
- Love Songs (disambiguation)
- Love Ballad (disambiguation)
- Love Sign (disambiguation)
- Love Theme (disambiguation)
- "Love You Like a Love Song", by Selena Gomez & the Scene, 2011
- Prem Geet (disambiguation) (lit. 'Love Song')
- Song of Love (disambiguation)
- Love Story (disambiguation)
