= The Asterisk War =

Japanese light novel series and its franchise

- Cover of the first light novel featuring Julis

学戦都市アスタリスク (Gakusen Toshi Asutarisuku)
- Genre: Action, harem
- Light novel
- Written by: Yū Miyazaki
- Illustrated by: Okiura
- Published by: Media Factory
- English publisher: NA: Yen Press
- Imprint: MF Bunko J
- Original run: September 25, 2012 – June 24, 2022
- Volumes: 17 + 3 side stories
- Manga
- Written by: Yū Miyazaki
- Illustrated by: Ningen
- Published by: Media Factory
- English publisher: NA: Yen Press
- Magazine: Monthly Comic Alive
- Original run: May 27, 2013 – September 27, 2016
- Volumes: 5
- Anime television series
- Directed by: Manabu Ono; Kenji Seto
- Produced by: Isao Sato; Masahito Ikemoto; Masayuki Nishide; Shousei Ito; Soichiro Umemoto; Yōsuke Futami; Youhei Hayashi
- Written by: Munemasa Nakamoto; Yukito Kizawa; Yukie Sugawara
- Music by: Rasmus Faber
- Studio: A-1 Pictures
- Licensed by: AUS: Crunchyroll Store Australia; NA: Aniplex of America; SEA: Medialink; UK: MVM Films
- Original network: Animax, Tokyo MX, GTV, GYT, BS11, ABC, CBC
- Original run: October 3, 2015 – June 18, 2016
- Episodes: 24
- icon

The Asterisk War: The Academy City on the Water (Japanese: 学戦都市アスタリスク, Hepburn: Gakusen Toshi Asutarisuku; lit. "Academy Battle City Asterisk") is a Japanese light novel series written by Yū Miyazaki, and illustrated by Okiura. Media Factory has published the series in seventeen volumes from September 25, 2012, to June 24, 2022, under their MF Bunko J imprint. Three spin-off volumes, Wings of Queenvale, were also released. The series was later serialized from January 2013 in Media Factory's seinen manga magazine Monthly Comic Alive where it was adapted into a manga. The artwork for the manga was done by Ningen, and three volumes have been collected into tankōbon. Eventually, an anime television series adaptation by A-1 Pictures was made which began airing on October 3, 2015. The anime aired for two seasons at twelve episodes each from October 3, 2015, to June 18, 2016. Other media adaptations include a video game called The Asterisk War: Houka Kenran which was released in Japan on January 28, 2016.

The anime has been licensed by Aniplex of America in North America, Crunchyroll Store Australia in Australasia, MVM Films in the United Kingdom and Medialink in Southeast Asia. The light novels and manga were licensed and localized by Yen Press from August 2016.

== Plot ==
In the 21st century, Earth is in a rapidly declining economic state as megacorporations known as the Integrated Enterprise Foundations (統合企業財体, Tōgō Kigyō Zaitai), rose to power after the Invertia (落星雨(インヴェルティア), Inverutia) (Note: Japanese text literally translates as "Rain of the Falling Stars Incident".) impact event destroyed most of the planet's cities and resulted in humans gaining superpowers to become the Genestella (星脈世代(ジェネステラ), Jenesutera). (Note: Japanese text literally translates as "Starpulse Generation".) The city of Rikka (六花), also called Asterisk, has six academies where the Genestella participate in tournaments called Festa (星武祭(フェスタ), Fesuta). (Note: Japanese text literally translates as "Star Battle Festival".) Battle performances at Seidoukan Academy (星導館学園, Seidōkan Gakuen), the city's fifth top-ranking academy, are falling significantly and the academy's incumbent student council president, Claudia Enfield, is determined to find a solution to the problem. Kirin Toudou is the academy's top fighter, but Claudia, as well as Lieseltanian princess Julis-Alexia von Riessfeld, are close behind.

Meanwhile, Ayato Amagiri investigates the disappearance of his sister, Haruka, a former student at Seidoukan. During his first day at the academy, Ayato is forced to fight Julis after discovering her half-dressed when returning her handkerchief to her. Claudia voids their duel and enrolls Ayato in Seidoukan. After rescuing Julis from a plot to cripple the Phoenix Festa, he sets out to become her protector and close friend. Eventually, Ayato wins against Kirin and is named the new top student at the academy. After Ayato participates in the Phoenix Festa with Julis to solve Seidoukan's performance crisis, they continue to participate in various Festas and also fight threats outside of the academy.

== Characters ==
=== Seidoukan Academy ===
Ayato Amagiri (天霧 綾斗, Amagiri Ayato)
Voiced by: Atsushi Tamaru, Ayaka Suwa (child) (Japanese); Erik Scott Kimerer (English)
Ayato is the top-ranked fighter at Seidoukan Academy. Transferring to Seidoukan at the recommendation of Claudia Enfield, Ayato searches for his sister Haruka's whereabouts. Afterward, he comes across one of the Four-Colored Runeswords, «Ser-Veresta»: Demon Blade of the Black Furnace (黒炉の魔剣(セルベレスタ), Seru Beresuta), which was once wielded by Haruka. After rescuing Julis when she was attacked by Silas, Ayato decides that his new goal is to protect Julis. Eventually, after dueling with Kirin Toudou, he becomes the academy's top student and earns himself the alias of Gathering Clouds (叢雲, Murakumo). Partnering up with Julis, they take on the Phoenix Festa together.
Julis-Alexia von Riessfeld (ユリス=アレクシア・フォン・リースフェルト, Yurisu-Arekushia Fon Rīsuferuto)
Voiced by: Ai Kakuma (Japanese); Kira Buckland (English)
Julis is the pink-haired fifth top-ranking fighter at Seidōkan Academy, known by the alias of «Glühen Rose»: Witch of Resplendent Flames (華焔の魔女(グリューンローズ), Gryūen Rōzu) and is the First Princess of Lieseltania, a small country located in the western Czech Republic. Her full name is Julis-Alexia Marie Florentia Renate von Riessfeld, according to Eishirō. She wields a rapier-type lux called «Aspera Spina» which she uses during the Phoenix tournament and bears the image of a flower for her power – control over flames. Her wish is to achieve what is known as a Grand Slam, a feat that involves rising to take the trophy in each of the three Festa, the Phoenix, the Gryps, and the Lindvolus. Teaming up with Ayato allowed her to achieve victory in the Phoenix and she joins Claudia's Team Enfield to participate in the Gryps. She resents Allekant Académie, specifically, the woman known as Magnum Opus, on the case of Orphelia Landlufen.
Claudia Enfield (クローディア・エンフィールド, Kurōdia Enfīrudo)
Voiced by: Nao Tōyama (Japanese); Erika Harlacher (English)
Claudia is the blonde second top-ranking fighter of Seidoukan Academy and its student council president, known by the alias of «Parta Morta»: Commander of a Thousand Visions (千見の盟主(パルタモルタ), Paruta Moruta). At the beginning of the series, Claudia recommends Ayato's transfer into the academy. She has held the position of Student Council President since junior high and wants to win the Gryps to make her wish come true because her powers are more geared towards team battles and as such, are not practical in the Phoenix and the Lindvolus. She uses the «Pan-Dora», an extremely powerful Orga Lux with the ability of precognition at the cost of reliving a different way of dying every night in her dreams.
Saya Sasamiya (沙々宮 紗夜, Sasamiya Saya)
Voiced by: Shiori Izawa (Japanese); Sarah Anne Williams (English)
The blue-haired daughter of Soichi and Kaya Sasamiya, Saya is Ayato's childhood friend and as such, was taught by Ayato the basics of the Amagiri Shinmei Style. She moved abroad six years ago due to her father's career as a Lux manufacturer and researcher. She seems to be an air-headed stoic who has trouble waking up in the morning and is directionally-challenged. Her main weapons are Luxes that her father made for her, including a Type 38 Lux Grenade Launcher: Helneklaum, a Type 39 Laser Cannon: Wolfdora, and a Type 41 Lux Twin Blaster: Waldenholt.
Kirin Toudou (刀藤 綺凛, Tōdō Kirin)
Voiced by: Ari Ozawa (Japanese); Brianna Knickerbocker (English)
Kirin is a silver-haired student in the junior high branch of Seidoukan Academy. Before meeting Ayato, she is the academy's top fighter at the beginning of the series, having defended her rank with only a normal nihontō, a testament to the absolute power of the Toudou Style (刀藤流, Tōdōryū) that she is the heiress of. She is known as the Keen-Edged Tempest (疾風刃雷, Shippū Jinrai) and along with Saya Sasamiya, rose to finish as a semifinalist in the Phoenix Festa.
Eishirou Yabuki (夜吹 英士郎, Yabuki Eishirō)
Voiced by: Yuma Uchida (Japanese); Max Mittelman (English)
Eishirou is Ayato's roommate. Well known as a member of the academy's newspaper club, he's also a member of the Shadow Star, a secret police force that works for the Integrated Enterprise Foundation (which is essentially the world government).
Lester MacPhail (レスター・マクフェイル, Resutā Makufeiru)
Voiced by: Takanori Hoshino (Japanese); Patrick Seitz (English)
Lester is the ninth highest-ranking fighter at Seidoukan Academy, his alias being «Kornephoros»: Axe of the Roaring Distance (轟遠の烈斧(コルネフォロス), Koruneforosu). Before the beginning of the series, he is ranked 5th but after losing to Julis, his rank drops. His Lux is an ax named «Bardiche-Leo».
Silas Norman (サイラス・ノーマン, Sairasu Nōman)
Voiced by: Yūichi Iguchi (Japanese); Kyle McCarley (English)
First introduced as a sidekick of Lester's, Silas is actually the mastermind behind the attacks Phoenix participants. After being defeated by Ayato, he was given a deal by Galaxy, the Integrated Enterprise Foundation, backing Seidoukan Academy, and is put to use as an operative of Shadowstar, as shown in Volume 9.
Randy Hooke (ランディ・フック, Randi Fukku)
Voiced by: Nobuyuki Kobushi (Japanese); Vic Mignogna (English)
Randy is another sidekick of Lester's and was his partner in the Phoenix before their team was defeated by Irene Urzaiz.
Kyouko Yatsuzaki (八津崎 匡子, Yatsuzaki Kyōko)
Voiced by: Yūko Kaida (Japanese); Johanna Luis (English)
Kyouko is the homeroom teacher of Ayato's class. Before becoming a teacher, she was the former second top-ranking fighter of Le Wolfe who led a team to victory in the Gryps Festa, being the only team from Le Wolfe to be victorious. As a student, her alias was «Machiaverus»: Witch of Nails (釘絶の魔女(マキアヴェルス), Makiaverusu) but it is unknown if she kept the alias after graduating (although this seems to be the case as Claudia addresses her by her alias).

=== St. Gallardworth Academy (Note: Also written as "st. Galahadworth School" in the official website of anime version.) ===
Ernest Fairclough (アーネスト・フェアクロフ, Ānesuto Feakurofu)
Voiced by: Takahiro Sakurai (Japanese); Vic Mignogna (English)
The student council president of St. Gallardworth Academy, Ernest Fairclough is the top-ranked student as well as the bearer of the alias, «Pendragon»: The Holy Knight (聖騎士(ペンドラゴン), Pendoragon), a title granted to him because of his wielding of the Orga Lux, also, one of the Four-Colored Runeswords, «Lei-Glems»: Demon Blade of White Purification (白濾の魔剣(レイグレム), Reiguremu). He is the leader of Team Lancelot.
Laetitia Blanchard (レティシア・ブランシャール, Retishia Buranshāru)
Voiced by: Saori Onishi (Japanese); Laura Post (English)
The Vice-President of St. Gallardworth Academy, Laetitia Blanchard is ranked #2 in her school, known as «Saint» (聖女, Seijō) and «Gloriara»: Witch of Shining Wings (光翼の魔女(グロリアラ), Guroriāra). She is a member of Team Lancelot and seems to harbor feelings of deep affection towards Ernest.
Elliot Forster (エリオット・フォースター, Eriotto Fōsutā)
Voiced by: Rie Takahashi (Japanese); Julie Anne Taylor (English)
Elliot Forster, like Kirin Toudou, is a junior high student and is an exceptionally skilled swordsman, rising to the rank of #12 despite the controlled society of St. Gallardworth. His alias is «Claíomh Solais»: Shining Sword (輝剣(クライオソレ), Kurau Sorasu).

=== Jie Long Seventh Institute ===
Xinglou Fan (范 星露, Fan Shinrū)
Voiced by: Omi Minami (Japanese); Cherami Leigh (English)
Despite only being nine years of age, Fan Xinglou is the inheritor of the title «Ban'yuu Tenra» (万有天羅, Banyū Tenra) and is the student council president of Jie Long Seventh Institute, considrered to be the most powerful Genestella as stated by Commander Helga Lindwall.
Shenyun Li (黎沈雲, Rī Shen'yun)
Voiced by: Satsumi Matsuda (Japanese); Erica Mendez (English)
«Phantom Builder» (幻映創起, Gen'ei Shinki) Shenyun Li is the ninth-ranked fighter in Jie Long and the brother of Shenhua. He is a very capable fighter, having forced Ayato to break the second layer of the seal placed on him by Haruka. He is a member of Team Huanglong (Team Yellow Dragon).
Shenhua Li (黎沈華, Rī Shenfa)
Voiced by: Risae Matsuda (Japanese); Lauren Landa (English)
«Phantom Vanisher» (幻映霧散, Gen'ei Musan) Shenhua Li is the tenth-ranked fighter in Jie Long and the sister of Shenyun. Shenhua's illusionary techniques are among the most powerful in all of Asterisk. She is a member of Team Huanglong (Team Yellow Dragon).
Hufeng Zhao (趙虎峰, Jao Fūfon)
Voiced by: Juri Kimura (Japanese); Kimberly Woods (English)
«Peerless Thorn» (天苛武葬, Tenka Musou) Hufeng Zhao is the fifth-ranked fighter in Jie Long and one of the main disciples of Xinglou. He is the leader of the Wood Faction and is a member of Team Huanglong (Team Yellow Dragon).
Ran Song (宋然, Son Ran)
Voiced by: Eiichiro Tokumoto (Japanese); Chris Cason (English)
Kunzhan Luo (羅坤展, Ruo Kunzan)
Voiced by: Tsuguo Mogami

=== Allekant Académie (Note: Also written as "Arlequint Academy" in the official website of anime version.) ===
Ernesta Kühne (エルネスタ・キューネ, Erunesuta Kyūne)
Voiced by: Chinatsu Akasaki (Japanese); Cassandra Lee Morris (English)
A student from Allekant Academy and leader of Pygmalion (Sculptor Faction). Her ultimate goal is to have her puppets gain equal rights to those of humans.
Camilla Pareto (カミラ・パレート, Kamira Parēto)
Voiced by: Mutsumi Tamura (Japanese); Cristina Vee (English)
A student from Allekant Academy and the leader of Ferrovious (Lions Faction). Her right arm and leg were destroyed in a war, leading Ernesta to give her prosthetics. Her ultimate goal is to create a Lux universally compatible with anyone. She develops a rivalry with Saya after claiming her father's Luxes were objectively inferior to other weapons.
Shuma Sakon (左近洲馬, Sakon Shūma)
Voiced by: Nobuo Tobita (Japanese); Lucien Dodge (English)
He is the student council president of Allekant. Not much else is known about him.
AR-D (アルディ, Arudi)
Voiced by: Wataru Hatano (Japanese); Keith Silverstein (English)
The puppet robot piloted by Ernesta, who displays incredible defenses.
RM-C (リムシィ, Rimushi)
Voiced by: Haruka Yoshimura (Japanese); Laura Post (English)
The puppet robot piloted by Camilla, who specializes in absolute offense.
Hilda Jane Rowlands (ヒルダ・ジェーン・ローランズ, Hiruda Jeen Rooranzu)
Voiced by: Yū Kobayashi (Japanese); Karen Strassman (English)
Known as Magnus Opus, she is the mad scientist behind Ophelia The strongest Strega in Asterisk

=== Le Wolfe Black Institute ===
Dirk Eberwein (ディルク・エーベルヴァイン, Diruku Ēberuvain)
Voiced by: Tomokazu Sugita (Japanese); Kaiji Tang (English)
The student council president of Le Wolfe Black Institute, (Note: Also written as "Rewolf Black Institute" in the official website of anime version.) Dirk Eberwein is the first non-Genestella to rise to the position of student council president with wits alone. He is so infamous, he has earned the alias of «Tyrant»: The Crafty King (悪辣の王(タイラント), Akuratsu no Ō(Tairanto)).
Korona Kashimaru (樫丸ころな, Kashimaru Korona)
Voiced by: Moe Toyota (Japanese); Xanthe Huynh (English)
The «Tyrant»'s secretary, Korona is a Strega with the ability to predict the future using tarots.
Irene Urzaiz (イレーネ・ウルサイス, Irēne Urusaisu)
Voiced by: Yumi Uchiyama (Japanese); Erica Lindbeck (English)
Le Wolfe's third-ranking student, Irene Urzaiz is a problem child who owes a huge debt to Dirk Eberwein. She is known as «Lamilexia»: Vampire Princess (吸血暴姫(ラミレクシア), Kyūketsuki Abahime(Ramirekushia)) due to her wielding of the Orga Lux, «Gravisheath»: Blood Scythe of Supreme Collapse (覇潰の血鎌(グラヴィシース), Hatsu no Chikama(Gurabishīsu)).
Priscilla Urzaiz (プリシラ・ウルサイス, Purishira Urusaisu)
Voiced by: Juri Nagatsuma (Japanese); Christine Marie Cabanos (English)
Irene's younger sister, Priscilla Urzaiz is a Strega with the much-coveted ability of self-regeneration and Irene uses her, much to her reluctance, as a power source for the Gravisheath, whose cost to wield it is to offer it blood.
Ophelia Landlufen (オーフェリア・ランドルーフェン, Ōferia Randorūfen)
Voiced by: Maaya Sakamoto (Japanese); Ryan Bartley (English)
A childhood friend of Julis, Orphelia Landlufen was collateral in the paying off of the orphanage's debt. She was sold to Frauenlob, the Integrated Enterprise Foundation backing Allekant Académie where she was used in an experiment by Hilda Jane Rowlands in order to artificially create Genestella. However, an anomaly in the experiment resulted in Hilda creating one of the world's strongest Strega. Through a series of covert dealings, Dirk Eberwein got his hands on Orphelia and she became a student at Le Wolfe. Her sheer power alone has allowed her to become the two-time champion of the solo tournament, the Lindvolus, defeating even the Sigrdrífa, Sylvia Lyyneheym. She is the top-ranked student in the official charts of Le Wolfe as well as the unofficial ranking websites. Her alias is «Erenshkigal»: Witch of Solitary Venom (孤毒の魔女(エレシキガル), Kojidoku no Majō(Erenshukīgaru)).
Moritz Nessler (モーリッツ・ネスラー, Mōrittsu Nesurā)
Voiced by: Masayuki Kato
Gerd Schiele (ゲルト・シーレ, Geruto Shīre)
Voiced by: Kenichirou Matsuda

=== Queenvale Academy for Young Ladies (Note: Also written as "Queenvail Girls' Academy" in the official website of anime version.) ===
Sylvia Lyyneheym (シルヴィア・リューネハイム, Shiruvia Ryūnehaimu)
Voiced by: Haruka Chisuga (Japanese); Mela Lee (English)
Sylvia Lyyenehym is the student council president of Queenvale Academy for Young Ladies and is the top-ranked student. Her alias is «Sigrdrífa»: Witch of Fearsome Melody (戦律の魔女(シグルドリーヴァ), Ikusaritsu no Majō(Shigurudorīva)). She is the world's top idol and is one of the strongest Strega in the history of Asterisk, the runner-up of the previous Lindvolus, losing only because Orphelia Landlufen was in the competition. Due to her popularity, she usually goes out in disguise. She is also in love with Ayato, the first of the five main heroines to realize that fact.
Yuzuhi Renjouji (蓮城寺 柚陽, Renjōji Yuzuhi)
Another childhood friend of Ayato's, Yuzuhi reunited with Ayato in the seventh light novel volume. She is also an adept practitioner in the Amagiri Shinmei Style, although her exceptional skill lies in the bow, to the point that Ayato admits that he cannot hope to match Yuzuhi using the bow.

== Media ==
=== Light novels ===
The series is written by Yū Miyazaki and illustrated by Okiura. It is published by Media Factory. The first volume was released in September 2012, and its final volume, volume 17, was released on June 24, 2022. Yen Press licensed the novels for publication in North America. The first English volume was released on August 30, 2016, and the last one on September 12, 2023. The first five volumes were translated into English by Melissa Tanaka and the rest by Haydn Trowell.

No.	Original release date	Original ISBN	English release date	English ISBN
1	September 25, 2012	978-4-04-066697-6	August 30, 2016	978-0-316-31527-2
2	January 25, 2013	978-4-04-066698-3	December 20, 2016	978-0-316-39858-9
3	May 24, 2013	978-4-04-067093-5	April 18, 2017	978-0-316-39860-2
4	September 25, 2013	978-4-04-067982-2	August 22, 2017	978-0-316-39862-6
5	March 25, 2014	978-4-04-066311-1	December 19, 2017	978-0-316-39865-7
6	June 25, 2014	978-4-04-066779-9	April 24, 2018	978-0-316-39867-1
7	November 25, 2014	978-4-04-067168-0	August 21, 2018	978-0-316-39869-5
8	May 25, 2015	978-4-04-067609-8	December 11, 2018	978-0-316-39871-8
9	September 25, 2015	978-4-04-067779-8	March 19, 2019	978-1-9753-0280-1
10	March 25, 2016	978-4-04-068033-0	June 18, 2019	978-1-9753-2935-8
11	August 25, 2016	978-4-04-068415-4	October 15, 2019	978-1-9753-0351-8
12	August 25, 2017	978-4-04-069337-8	January 21, 2020	978-1-9753-0431-7
13	March 24, 2018	978-4-04-069613-3	May 26, 2020	978-1-9753-0433-1
14	April 25, 2018	978-4-04-069614-0	November 24, 2020	978-1-9753-5945-4
15	December 25, 2019	978-4-04-064009-9	January 19, 2021	978-1-9753-1639-6
16	November 25, 2021	978-4-04-064805-7	November 22, 2022	978-1-9753-4860-1
17	June 24, 2022	978-4-04-064870-5	September 12, 2023	978-1-9753-6909-5

==== Wings of Queenvale ====
Yuu Miyazaki has also worked on a spinoff, focusing on Minato Wakamiya, the main protagonist, Chloe Flockhart, Minato's best friend, Sophia Fairclough, the younger sister of Ernest Fairclough, Nina Achenwall, a Strega whose powers are invoked through the mental image of a deck of cards, and Yuzuhi Renjouji, a childhood friend of Ayato Amagiri who trained in the Yatsuka Dojo of the Amagiri Shinmei Style, all students of Queenvale Academy for Young Ladies.

No.	Japanese release date	Japanese ISBN
1	April 25, 2016	978-4-04-068316-4
2	March 25, 2017	978-4-04-068771-1
3	April 25, 2019	978-4-04-065243-6

=== Manga ===
A manga adaptation by Ningen was published from 2013 to 2016 and has been compiled into five volumes. It was released in English by Yen Press. The English translation is by Melissa Tanaka. A manga adaptation of the spinoff Wings of Queenvale novels by Shou Akane premiered in Kodansha's Bessatsu Shōnen Magazine in August 2014, and ended in September 2016. The spinoff manga adaptation was collected in four volumes.

No.	Original release date	Original ISBN	English release date	English ISBN
1	February 22, 2014	978-4-04-066274-9	July 26, 2016	978-0-316-31528-9
2	November 22, 2014	978-4-04-066274-9	October 25, 2016	978-0-316-39876-3
3	September 19, 2015	978-4-04-067805-4	March 21, 2017	978-0-316-50275-7
4	March 23, 2016	978-4-04-068222-8	June 20, 2017	978-0-316-47173-2
5	September 23, 2016	978-4-04-068548-9	September 19, 2017	978-0-316-47342-2

=== Anime ===
Directed by Manabu Ono and Kenji Seto, an anime adaptation of the series was broadcast from October 3 to December 19, 2015, with a second season following from April 2 through June 18, 2016.

Four pieces of theme music are used for the two seasons: two opening themes and two ending themes. The opening themes, "Brand-new world" and "The Asterisk War", are both performed by Shiena Nishizawa. The first ending theme, titled "Waiting for the rain", is performed by Maaya Sakamoto, while the second ending theme is "Ai no Uta (Words of Love)" (愛の詩) performed by Haruka Chisuga. All theme songs and musical scores were written and produced by Rasmus Faber

Aniplex of America licensed the series for an English-language release in North and South America and simulcasted the series on Crunchyroll's streaming services. Aniplex released the series on DVD and Blu-ray in four compilations, each containing 6 episodes, from September 20, 2016, to April 25, 2017.

==== Season 1 ====
No.	Title	Original air date
1	"Witch of the Resplendent Flames" "Kaen no Majo" (華焔の魔女)	October 3, 2015
At Seidoukan Academy, Ayato Amagiri, a young male Genestella, grabs a handkerchief dropped from a dormitory window. When Ayato returns it to its owner, Julis-Alexia von Riessfeld, he inadvertently discovers her putting her clothes on. Julis challenges Ayato to a duel, but the duel is interrupted when the Seidoukan student council president, Claudia Enfield, intervenes as Ayato is not yet officially enrolled at Seidoukan. Ayato and Claudia discuss his sister Haruka, who has disappeared and led Ayato to transfer to Seidoukan. Ayato is introduced to the class. After school, Lester MacPhail challenges Julis to a duel.
2	"Ser Veresta" "Seru Beresuta" (セル ベレスタ)	October 10, 2015
Lester withdraws his challenge when Ayato intervenes. Julis explains that while she is a princess, she is fighting because she needs money for her country. Ayato meets up with his childhood friend Saya Sasamiya in class. Claudia appears when Saya is arguing with Julis to decide who takes Ayato on a tour around town. Julis takes Ayato on a tour with Saya. While on the tour, Julis and Saya get attacked by a hooded man and they easily defeat him. Later that day, Claudia takes Ayato to select his weapon. With Lester unable to wield the Ser Veresta, which is an Ogre Lux that Haruka previously wielded, Ayato grabs the Ser Veresta and displays his compatibility with it.
3	"A Holiday for Two" "Futari no Kyūjitsu" (二人の休日)	October 17, 2015
Ayato is asked by Claudia to find out who is responsible for the attacks that have been happening to Seidoukan students. Ayato and Julis go out on a date. Julis explains that she is fighting for money because she needs it to start up some welfare projects. The two meet with Lester demanding a rematch with Julis, but he withdraws because of his honor code. On the way home, Ayato and Julis get ambushed by Le Wolfe students. Julis easily defeats them. She discovers that a hooded man hired them to attack those Seidoukan students.
4	"Unshackled" "Tokihanata Reshi Mono" (解き放たれし者)	October 24, 2015
The hooded men turn out to be robots built by Ernesta Kuhne of Allekant and put to use by Silas Norman's Dante ability. Silas's motive is to injure as many of the top fighters using his robotic fighters so that he would have an easier time winning the Phoenix Festa. Julis takes on Silas's robots, but she is overpowered by their great numbers before Ayato intervenes and rescues Julis. Ayato unleashes the power of the Ser Veresta. However, he realizes that his power only lasts for five minutes because of the shackles on his power cast by Haruka. Meanwhile, Claudia corners and captures Silas.
5	"Lightning Blade Speed" "Shippūjinrai" (疾風刃雷)	October 31, 2015
In a meeting between student council presidents, Claudia strikes an agreement with Arlequint to form a partnership in research and development. Meanwhile, Ayato bumps into Kirin Toudou, who is the highest-ranking student of Seidoukan. Witnessing her uncle Kouichiro attacking her, Ayato intervenes and asks him to stop abusing her. Kouichiro accepts if he can defeat Kirin in a duel. Ayato holds back in his duel and loses to Kirin. Ayato finds out from Julis that Kirin is the top fighter in Seidoukan Academy despite her age.
6	"The True Face of the Girl" "Sugao no Shōjo" (素顔の少女)	November 7, 2015
Julis lectures Ayato for challenging Kirin, but she commends him for his actions. Ayato and Kirin have a training session together. Kirin explains that Kouichiro is an ambitious man who is plotting to use her to become a board member of the executive committee. Kirin also explains that she is fighting for her father, Seijiro, who was detained after using magic in self-defense. During the training session, Ayato and Kirin get attacked by shapeshifting lizards and end up falling underground.
7	"Decisions and Duels" "Ketsui to Kettō" (決意と決闘)	November 14, 2015
Ayato defeats the dragon that sent the shapeshifting lizards to attack him and Kirin. While trapped underground, Kirin explains her story about Seijiro: she was held hostage by a criminal that Seijiro killed to rescue her; he was arrested as a result. The two are rescued by other people. Upon hearing that Kouichiro is using her as a pawn in his plot, Kirin decides to follow Ayato instead of her uncle. Kirin challenges Ayato to a duel. Both fighters goes all out with Ayato emerging victorious. Following the duel, Kirin decides to train with Ayato and pair up with Saya for the Phoenix Festa as both are fighting for their fathers.
8	"A Holiday for Two, Part 2" "Futari no Kyūjitsu Ni" (二人の休日②)	November 21, 2015
Saya and Kirin struggle with their teamwork during a training session. Instead of continuing their training, the two go on a shopping trip together to strengthen their bonds. Saya buys a gun from a used Lux store. Saya and Kirin head to the pool to help Kirin learn how to swim. While at the pool, Kirin accidentally bumps into Violet Weinberg of Queenvail. An enraged Violet fights Saya but is easily defeated. The next day, Saya and Kirin return to training with their teamwork greatly improved. The match selections for the Phoenix Festa are announced with Ayato and Julis not having to fight Saya and Kirin until the finals.
9	"The Phoenix Festa" "Fenikusu" (鳳凰星武祭)	November 28, 2015
Irene Urzaiz of Le Wolfe is released from prison. She is given orders by the school's student council president, Dirk Eberwein, to defeat Ayato in the Phoenix Festa. The tournament begins with Ayato and Julis quickly winning their first match with a single strike by Ayato using the Ser Veresta. Following the match, Ayato has interviews with the media. Ayato is determined to keep the time limit of the Ser Veresta a secret. In the next match, Ernesta and Camilla easily win their first match using their robots RM-C and AR-D.
10	"The Tyrant Vampire Princess" "Ramirekushia" (吸血暴姫)	December 5, 2015
Saya's father, Souichi, tells her that he has a new gun prepared for her, but it would not arrive in time for her first match. Ayato and Julis go off to get some practice. While rushing to catch Saya and Kirin's first match, they see Irene brawling in the streets. Irene approaches Ayato to pick a fight with him, but her sister Priscilla arrives to apologize. Saya and Kirin win their first match. Ayato and Julis win their second match with only Julis attacking. The next match has Lester and Randy against Irene and Priscilla. Irene defeats Randy. As part of the plan, Priscilla's blood is drained to power Irene's Ogre Lux, the Gravi-Sheath. However, Irene sucks blood from Priscilla to recharge her Gravi-Sheath. Irene easily defeats Lester and wins the match.
11	"Power and Its Price" "Chikara to Daishō" (力と代償)	December 12, 2015
While searching for Saya, Ayato is met by Priscilla, who is being pursued by gamblers. Ayato helps Priscilla shake her pursuers. Irene arrives and tells Ayato that they are opponents for the next match. Irene attacks Dirk for failing to ensure Priscilla's safety as part of the contract, but her attack is rebuffed. Later that day, Ayato and Julis get invited to dinner at Irene and Priscilla's apartment. Irene tells Ayato and Julis her problem. Irene owes a massive debt to Dirk. She has been gambling at the casino to help pay it off. Later that night, Ayato sneaks into Claudia's apartment to ask about Irene's weapon. He learns that Ogre Luxes can change the wielder's personality.
12	"The Gravi-Sheath" "Guravishīzu" (グラヴィシーズ)	December 19, 2015
Irene recalls the time she received the Gravi-Sheath from Dirk shortly before the fourth match with Ayato and Julis. Julis unleashes her Rafflesia attack after some strategical tactics, but Irene survives the attack. Irene sucks Priscilla's blood. The Gravi-Sheath possesses Irene and causes a massive gravity flux on the battlefield. Ayato withstands the gravity attack and destroys the Gravi-Sheath using the Reverse-gouging Shell attack to win the match. Ayato used his powers past the five-minute limit that he suffers from its side effects. The side effects are now public knowledge. Dirk decides to form a partnership with Ernesta and Camilla. Priscilla lets Irene know that she will become a fighter someday to fight alongside Irene. Meanwhile, Steering Committee chairman Madiath Mesa reveals that he has a scheme. By winning, Ayato is interfering with Madiath's plan. When Julis asks Ayato if he is okay, he says he is okay. Ayato later appears to be in pain. Ayato vows to Julis that he will protect her. After that, Ayato and Julis attempt to kiss, but Claudia, Saya, and Kirin walk in, interrupting them.

==== Season 2 ====
No. overall	No. in season	Title	Original air date
13	1	"Divine Revelations" "Banyū Tenra" (有天羅万)	April 2, 2016
Ayato and Julis fight Song Ran and Zhou Kunzhan of Jie Long. Julis creates a wall of fire to turn the match into two one-on-one battles. In a coordinated attack, Julis makes a hole in the wall. Ayato and Julis take out each other's opponents. Following the match, the maid Flora Klemm shows up in the locker room to meet Julis.
14	2	"Corrupt Ruler" "Akuratsu no Ō" (悪辣の王)	April 9, 2016
Julis explains her background and relationship with Flora. One day, Julis visited the orphanage Flora is from. Julis' visit improved everybody's outlooks on life. As a result, Julis explains that she is fighting in the tournament to support the orphanage. The next day, Ayato, Julis, and Flora go out on a shopping trip together. Ayato is asked by a Rewolf student to meet Dirk, who reveals that Haruka was seriously injured fighting in an illegal underground tournament called the Eclipse Festa.
15	3	"Breaking the Memory Barrier" "Tsuioku Tōha" (追憶闘破)	April 16, 2016
On the night before the match, Ayato and Saya recall the time they trained together with Haruka. Ayato and Saya could never beat Haruka. The match against the twins Shenyun and Shenhua of Jie Long begins with Ayato activating his powers and knowing about his time limit. Shenyun creates clones of himself to force Ayato to use up his energy. Shenyun traps Ayato in his talisman cage. Julis fights Shenhua. Following the hit Ayato took from the exploding talismans, Shenyun is about to finish off Ayato with his time limit having been reached until Julis rescues him.
16	4	"Never Back Down" "Yuzurenu Omoi" (譲れぬ想い)	April 23, 2016
With Ayato battered, Julis struggles to defend him as she gets chained up. In response, Ayato unlocks the second level of his seal that allows him to sustain his powers for an hour. Realizing that the attacks are illusions, Ayato closes his eyes to withstand the attack and defeats Shenhua. Ayato defeats Shenyun after extending the reach of his weapon to destroy his fireball barrage. Following the match, Saya explains that her father lost most of his body in a lab accident. Saya and Kirin begin their semifinal match against AR-D and RM-C by reading their moves, which is something all previous opponents were unable to do.
17	5	"The Tyrant's Puppet Strings" "Akuratsu no Kuri-ito" (悪辣の繰り糸)	April 30, 2016
Saya unleashes her Lux cannon, but AR-D's barrier reduces the damage. The two robots, AR-D and RM-C, combine and overwhelm an exhausted Saya and Kirin. Following the match, Flora is kidnapped. The captors demand that Ayato put a freeze on his Ser Veresta that would make him unable to use the weapon ever again. Claudia comes up with a plan to apply for the freeze and then to stall the process for as long as possible until Flora can be rescued. Saya and Kirin go out to search for Flora.
18	6	"Scrambling" "Honsō" (奔走)	May 7, 2016
Ayato and Julis win their semifinal match against Elliot and Doroteo of St. Galahadworth without using Ser Veresta. Saya and Kirin continue to search around for leads with help from Eishirou. Ayato meets Irene in secret. Camilla recalls the past when she lost her limbs in a terrorist attack. Ernesta installed prosthetic limbs to replace them. Going off based on Irene's speculation, Ayato goes to Rotlicht. Rotlicht is cornered by mafia men. A mysterious girl suddenly appears.
19	7	"Battle Song" "Senritsu" (戦律)	May 14, 2016
Ayato and the mysterious girl escape the mafia. One person followed them. That one person is easily defeated. The mysterious girl reveals herself as the songstress Sylvia Lyyneheym. Sylvia sings a song to locate Flora. Ayato passes on her location to Saya and Kirin as they decide that they will rescue Flora themselves to allow Ayato and Julis to concentrate on their match. Saya and Kirin arrive at the hideout. Saya and Kirin are attacked by an endless army of shadows when Lester arrives to cover for them as they proceed deeper into the hideout.
20	8	"The Phoenix Showdown" "Fenikusu Kessen" (覇凰決戦)	May 21, 2016
In the match, Ayato and Julis form a strategy to force AR-D and RM-C to merge as quickly as possible and defeat them during the merge. During the merging process, Ayato defeats RM-C. However, Ayato fails to defeat AR-D. AR-D's transformed version makes him stronger than before. Meanwhile, Saya and Kirin rescue Flora after defeating the shadow master Wernher in a tough battle. With Flora rescued, Claudia announces the news over the microphone. Ayato activates the Ser Veresta now that the freeze has been canceled.
21	9	"Clinching Victory" "Kecchaku" (決着)	May 28, 2016
Ayato and AR-D battle. Deciding that speed is the key to victory, Julis transfers her energy to the Ser Veresta. Ayato performs the Moon of Carnage technique to defeat AR-D and win the Phoenix Festa. Ayato is presented the trophy from Madiath. Meanwhile, Eishiro kills Wernher. After the battle, Ayato and Julis are congratulated. Camilla and RM-C approach Saya asking for a rematch wanting to settle things with a fair fight. Ayato makes a request to Madiath to search for Haruka. Shortly afterward, Madiath goes his separate ways from Dirk and reveals that he is secretly in possession of Haruka's body.
22	10	"Lieseltania" "Rīzerutania" (リーゼルタニア)	June 4, 2016
Ayato, Julis, Claudia, Saya, and Kirin travel to Lieseltania for the winter break. Julis returns to her home to meet up with her brother Jolbert and sister-in-law Maria. Ayato meets up with Saya on the rooftop. Saya apologizes for cutting off communications between them when she moved away. Claudia asks everybody to form a team of five for the upcoming Gryps Festa and they accept. Later that night, the Riessfeld family puts on a ball that everybody attends. Ayato is approached by Gustave Malraux, who implores him to leave Claudia's team. Ayato refuses and is attacked by Gustave's chimera. Eventually, Ayato, Julis, Claudia, Saya, and Kirin destroy the chimera and Gustave retreats.
23	11	"The Lonely Strega" "Kodoku no Majo" (孤毒の魔女)	June 11, 2016
Jolbert asks Julis to marry Ayato and reveals that she has to abandon the Gryps Festa, as Julis might not be able to handle the added political pressure with her reputation earned by winning the Phoenix Festa. Julis visits the orphanage that she wanted to save with Ayato. On the way back home, she encounters her old friend, Ophelia Landlufen. Julis and Ophelia have a duel with Ophelia's miasma attacks overpowering Julis. Ayato steps in to fight Ophelia until Gustave arrives and uses two chimeras to fight Ayato and Julis. When Claudia arrives and easily defeat the chimeras, Ophelia and Gustave flee.
24	12	"Reunion" "Saikai" (再会)	June 18, 2016
Ayato wakes up three days later after fighting Ophelia and is informed about her history with Julis. In a flashback, a young Ophelia befriends Julis. With the orphanage in desperate need of money, Ophelia is sold off to be experimented on by the Arlequint scientist Hilda Jane Rowlands. Ophelia is artificially made into a Genestella that wilts any plants that she approaches. Back in the present, the Lieseltanian capital is under attack by Gustave's chimeras. Gustave uses a hydra monster to attack Julis. Ayato, Julis, and Saya defeat the hydra monster while Kirin captures Gustave. With everybody heading back to Seidoukan Academy, Julis informs Jolbert of her intentions to change Lieseltania. Julis commits herself to fight in the Gryps Festa. Back at Seidoukan Academy, Ayato sees Haruka's comatose body and encounters Hilda, who informs him that she can heal Haruka. Ayato refuses her offer and participates in the Gryps Festa.

=== Video game ===
A PlayStation Vita simulation game by Bandai Namco Games titled The Asterisk War: Houka Kenran was released in Japan on January 28, 2016.
