= Supplement (album) =

Supplement (サプリメント)

Studio album by Ai Nonaka (野中藍)
- Released: 22 April 2009
- Recorded: 2008–2009
- Genre: J-pop
- Length: 47:49
- Label: Starchild
- Producer: Ootsuki Toshimichi (大月俊倫); Moriyama Atsu (森山敦); Morita Shuken(PV CLIP) (森田珠見)

Ai Nonaka (野中藍) chronology
| Namida no Kiseki (2008) | Supplement (サプリメント) (2009) | Airenjaa (2010) |

Initial limited edition cover

Supplement is the fourth studio album by Ai Nonaka (野中藍), released on 22 April 2009. Excluding the bonus track, the album contains eight new songs and three songs compiled from past singles. Nonaka wrote the lyrics of the bonus track, Oyasumi (おやすみ).

== Track listing ==
1. VOICE
2. Kira Kira (キラキラ)
3. Motto (もっと)
4. Hop Step Love
5. Sweet Sunny Day
6. Tsunaide, Tsunaide (つないで、つないで)
7. Cherisshu (チェリッシュ)
8. Boku No Kimochi (ぼくの気持ち)
9. Kono mama, Kono mama (このまま、このまま)
10. Melody
11. Datte Anata Wa Anata Da Kara (だってあなたはあなただから)
12. Oyasumi (おやすみ)(BONUS TRACK)

== DVD (PV CLIPS) (Initial Limited Edition Only) ==
1. Sweet Sunny Day
