= Song of Love =

Song of Love may refer to:

- Song of love or love song, a song about falling in love
- The Song of Love (1923 film)
- Song of Love (1929 film), a film starring Belle Baker and Ralph Graves
- The Song of Love (1930 film)
- Song of Love (1947 film), a film starring Katharine Hepburn and Paul Henreid
- A Song of Love (Un chant d'amour), a 1950 film by Jean Genet
- Pyar Ka Taraana (lit. 'Song of Love'), a 1993 Indian Hindi-language film
- The Song of Love, a painting by Giorgio de Chirico
- "Song of Love" (song), a song by Paul McCartney
- "Song of Love", a song by Do As Infinity from True Song

== See also ==
- Love Song (disambiguation)
- Love Songs (disambiguation)
- Ai no Uta (disambiguation)
