= Prem Geet =

Prem Geet (lit. 'love song' in Indic languages) may refer to:

- Prem Geet (1981 film), an Indian Hindi-language film
- Prem Geet (1993 film), a Bangladeshi musical film
- Prem Geet (2016 film), a Nepalese romantic comedy film
- Prem Geet 2 (2017 film), a Nepalese romantic film
- Prem Geet 3 (2022 film), a Nepalese romantic film

== See also ==
- Love Song (disambiguation)
