= Namida No Kiseki =

Namida No Kiseki (ナミダノキセキ)

Studio album by Ai Nonaka (野中藍)
- Released: (Japan) 12 March 2008
- Genre: J-pop
- Length: 48:04
- Label: Starchild

Ai Nonaka (野中藍) chronology
Shiawase no Iro (2006)	Namida No Kiseki (ナミダノキセキ) (2008)	Supplement (2009)

Initial Limited Edition Cover

Namida No Kiseki is the 3rd studio album by Ai Nonaka (野中藍), released on 12 March 2008. The album contains 3 songs from past singles, 8 new songs, and 1 unlisted hidden track "Arigatou (ありがとう)" with lyrics penned by Nonaka herself. It reached the 62nd place on the Oricon Weekly Albums Chart.

== Track listing ==
1. CACAO85
2. A-ri-e-na-i! (あ・り・え・な・い)
3. Amanojaku (アマノジャク)
4. Maybe?
5. Koi no Museum (恋のミュージアム)
6. NO DREAM X NO LIFE
7. Cheer Ru-ga! (チアルーガ!)
8. Hitoribocchi (ひとりぼっち)
9. Kirari (キラリ)
10. Ureshinaki (ウレシ泣キ)
11. Donna Toki Datte (どんなときだって)(BONUS TRACK)

== DVD (PV CLIPS) (Initial Limited Edition Only) ==
1. Amanojaku (アマノジャク)
