= Airenjaa =

Airenjaa (アイレンジャー)

Greatest hits album by Ai Nonaka (野中藍)
- Released: (Japan) 27 January 2010
- Genre: J-pop
- Label: Starchild

Ai Nonaka (野中藍) chronology
Supplement (2009)	Airenjaa (アイレンジャー) (2010)

Initial Limited Edition Cover

Airenjaa is the first "Best Of" album by Ai Nonaka (野中藍), released on 27 January 2010. Fifteen songs were from past releases with two new songs added. The lyrics of the new song, Fight!! (ファイト!!), were penned by Nonaka herself. One of the new songs, Minna no Uta (Everybody's Song) (みんなのうた), was selected as 2010 January's ending theme for "Anison Plus (アニソンぷらす)", a weekly 30-minute anime song and artist-related program that has monthly changing opening and ending themes and is broadcast by TV Tokyo. As part of the efforts in promoting this album, Nonaka appeared as the pickup artist for the third time in Anison Plus (broadcast on 25 January 2010 27:15, i.e. 26 January 2010 3.15am). The theme of Airenjā is about five rangers led by the green ranger (renjā) protecting love (ai), thus rangers of love.

== Track listing ==
1. Yume no Drive (夢のドライブ)
2. Hatsukoi Frill (初恋フリル)
3. Kaze no Radio (風のラジオ)
4. LOVE@MESSENGER
5. Shiawase no Tane (幸せの種)
6. espresso
7. Yukina Miki (ゆきなみき)
8. Cheer Ruuga! (チアルーガ!)
9. Ureshinaki (ウレシ泣キ)
10. CACAO85
11. Donna Toki Datte (どんなときだって)
12. Datte Anata Wa Anata Da Kara (だってあなたはあなただから)
13. VOICE
14. Kira Kira (キラキラ)
15. Motto (もっと)
16. Minna no Uta (みんなのうた)
  - New song for this album
17. Fight!! (ファイト!!)
  - New song for this album

== DVD (PV CLIPS) (Initial Limited Edition Only) ==
1. Yume no Drive (夢のドライブ)
2. Tokimeki no Kotoba (トキメキの言葉)
3. LOVE@MESSENGER
4. Cheer Ruuga! (チアルーガ!)
5. Koi no Museum (恋のミュージアム)
6. Ureshinaki (ウレシ泣キ)
7. Amanojaku (アマノジャク)
8. Datte Anata Wa Anata Da Kara "Red Ver." (だってあなたはあなただから あかver.)
9. Datte Anata Wa Anata Da Kara "Blue Ver." (だってあなたじゃあなただから あおver.)
10. Sweet Sunny Day
11. Minna no Uta (みんなのうた)
