= Ai Nonaka =

Japanese voice actress and singer (born 1981)

- 野中 藍
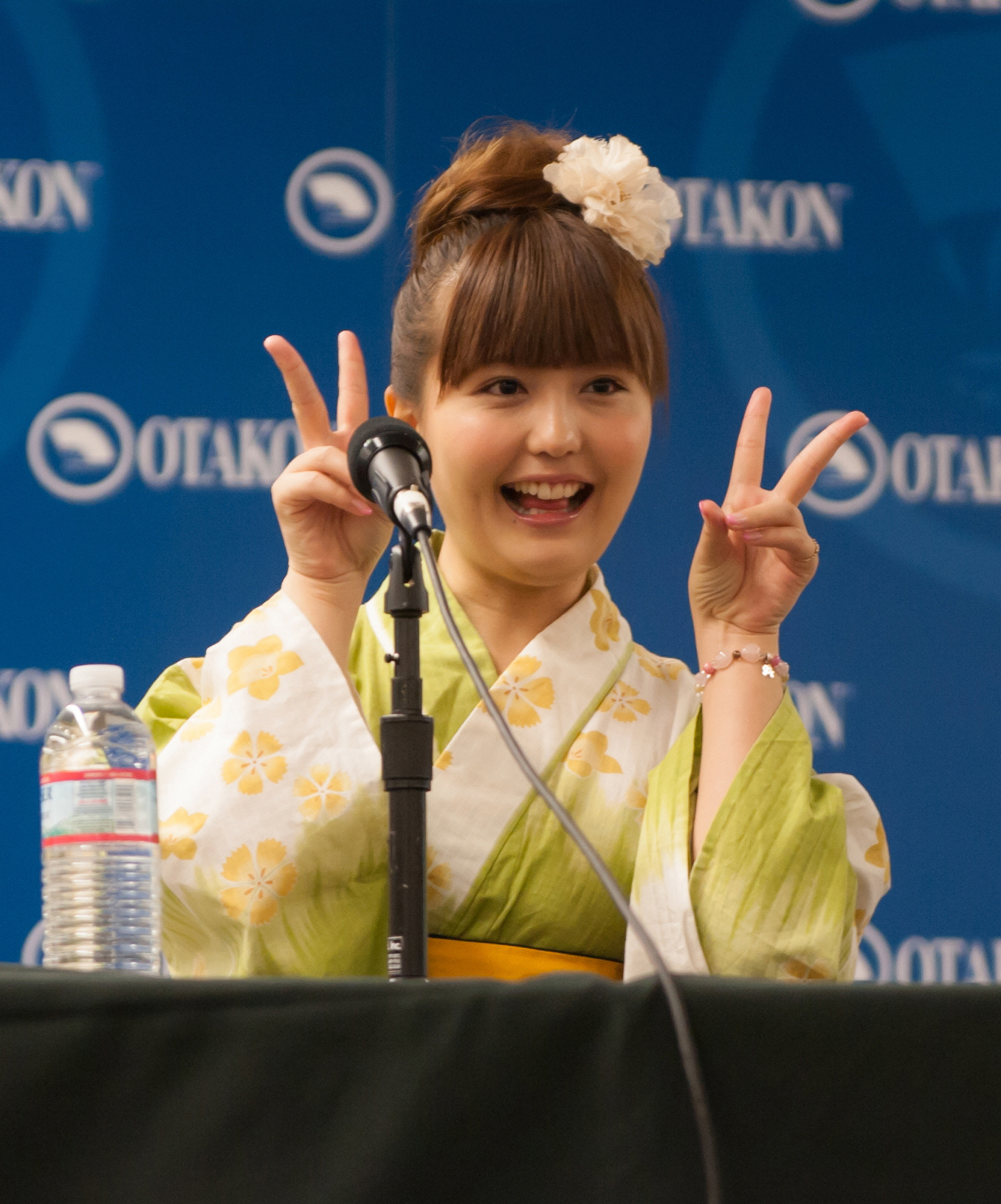
- Ai Nonaka at Otakon 2012 on July 28 of that year
- Born: June 8, 1981 (age 45); Sawara-ku, Fukuoka, Japan
- Other name: Ai-pon (藍ぽん)
- Occupations: Voice actress; singer
- Years active: 2000–present
- Agent: Aoni Production
- Notable work: Stellvia as Shima Katase; Sayonara, Zetsubou-Sensei as Kafuka Fu'ura; Bottle Fairy as Hororo; Negima! Magister Negi Magi as Konoka Konoe; Puella Magi Madoka Magica as Kyoko Sakura; Bobobo-bo Bo-bobo as Beauty; Clannad as Fuko Ibuki; Pani Poni Dash! as Ichijō; Dead or Alive as Honoka; Xenoblade Chronicles 2 as Tora
- Height: 156 cm (5 ft 1 in)
- Children: 2
- Website: Official website

Ai Nonaka (野中 藍, Nonaka Ai; born June 8, 1981) is a Japanese voice actress and singer. She works for Aoni Production and was formerly a member of the voice actor unit Drops, which included fellow voice actor Akemi Kanda, Tomoko Kaneda, Mariko Kōda, and Ryōko Shiraishi. In high school in Fukuoka, she was head of the drama club and her ambition was to play male roles in the famous all-female Takarazuka Revue.

== Personal life and career ==
Nonaka's initial interest in voice acting started after watching YuYu Hakusho. While self-proclaiming that she really would have preferred an acting career, but due to her height, as well as her interest in anime, she ultimately pursued voice acting after high school and graduated from the 21st batch of students from the Tokyo branch of Aoni's Seiyū Coaching School.

In December 2009, she announced both on her blog and web radio, "Radio Kouza Yoku Wakaru Gendai Mahou Dai Ichi" (ラジオ講座よくわかる現代魔法第一) episode 30, that she has passed and acquired level 2 certification in aromatherapy. This was again announced while Nonaka was featured in the January 25, 2010, broadcast of Anison Plus.

Nonaka has a regular column, "Ai-pon no O'Toriyose Hyaku Sen" (アイぽんのお取り寄せ100選), in monthly voice magazine, Seiyū Animedia (声優アニメディア). She has been featured three times in Anison Plus since the program started on July 7, 2008, (July 28, 2008, January 26, 2009, January 25, 2010).

On August 20, 2017, she announced on both her blog and YouTube channel that she married someone outside the voice acting business days earlier on August 16 of that same year. On January 5, 2019, she announced on her blog that she had given birth to their first child the previous year.

On December 15, 2020, she tested positive for COVID-19 and was recovering from the disease, but had fully recovered that month by December 24.

On June 8, 2021, she announced her pregnancy with a second child, with the second child being born later that year on September 1.

== Filmography ==
=== Television animation ===
List of voice performances in television animation
Year	Title	Role	Notes	Source
2001	One Piece	"Gaya" (voice of the crowd), Googly-Eyed, Mansherry	"Gaya" was debut voice acting role, Googly-Eyed in Eps. 567-568	
2002	Platonic Chain	Kagura Rika		
2002	Ultimate Muscle	Keiko, Terry the Kid (young)		
2003	Bobobo-bo Bo-bobo	Beauty		
2003	Bottle Fairy	Hororo		
2003	R.O.D the TV	Touko Shigno		
2003	Stellvia of the Universe	Shima Katase		
2004	Gakuen Alice	Nonoko Ogasawara		
2004	Kannazuki no Miko	Nekoko		
2004	Kinnikuman Nisei – Ultimate Muscle	Keiko		
2004	Doki Doki School Hours	Hanako Horie		
2005	Jinki: Extend	Satsuki Kawamoto		
2005	Kamichu!	Miko Saegusa		
2005	Mahō Sensei Negima	Konoka Konoe		
2005	Pani Poni Dash!	Ichijō, Ichijō's Younger Sister		
2006	Ape Escape	Sayaka		
2006	Binchō-tan	Binchō-tan		
2006	Kinnikuman Nisei 2	Keiko		
2006	Kujibiki Unbalance	Tokino Akiyama		
2006	Negima!?	Konoka Konoe		
2006	Poka Poka Mori no Rascal	Riruru		
2006	Sōkō no Strain	Lavinia Reberth and (Sara's and Ralph's) Emily		
2007	Doraemon	Noramyako, Mari Marui		
2007	Clannad	Fuko Ibuki		
2007	Gakuen Utopia Manabi Straight!	Mika Inamori		
2007	Mushi-Uta	C		
2007	Sayonara Zetsubō Sensei	Kafuka Fuura		
2008	Himitsu – Top Secret	Nanako Amachi		
2008	Mahō Sensei Negima OAD – Shiroki Tsubasa Ala Alba	Konoka Konoe		
2008	Real Drive	Yukino		
2008	Zoku Sayonara Zetsubō Sensei	Kafuka Fuura		
2008	Toradora!	Kihara Maya		
2009	Clannad After Story	Fuko Ibuki		
2009	Sora wo Kakeru Shōjo	Imoko Shishidou		
2009	Asura Cryin'	Kanade Takatsuki		
2009	Asura Cryin' 2	Kanade Takatsuki		
2009	Mahō Sensei Negima OAD – Mou Hitotsu No Sekai	Konoka Konoe		
2009	Natsu no Arashi!	Yayoi Fushimi		
2009	Zan Sayonara Zetsubō Sensei	Kafuka Fuura		
2009	Yoku Wakaru Gendai Mahō	Koyomi Morishita		
2009	Tatakau Shisho	Chakoly Cocotte		
2009	Tokyo Magnitude 8.0	Aya		
2010	The World God Only Knows	Fujiidera		
2010	Otome Yōkai Zakuro	Mugi		
2011	Ground Control to Psychoelectric Girl	Meme Touwa		
2011	Puella Magi Madoka Magica	Kyoko Sakura		
2011	Gintama	Pirako Doromizu		
2012	Another	Yukari Sakuragi		
2012	Saki Achiga-hen episode of Side-A	Kōko Fukuyo		
2013	Sasami-san@Ganbaranai	Tama Yagami		
2013	Muromi-san	Hii-chan		
2013	The World God Only Knows	Fujidera		
2013	WataMote	Megumi Imae		
2014	Amagi Brilliant Park	Tirami		
2014	Gugure! Kokkuri-san	Noel		
2014	Robot Girls Z	Archduke Gorgon		
2014	Saki: The Nationals	Kōko Fukuyo		
2015	Gourmet Girl Graffiti	Akira Machiko		
2015	Osomatsu-san	Chibimi		
2015	Shōnen Hollywood -Holly Stage for 50-	Kotomi		
2016	Tsukiuta. The Animation	Chisa Togawa		
2017	Schoolgirl Strikers	Sasa Momokawa		
2017	Kemono Friends	Reticulated Giraffe	Eps. 10 and 12	
2017	Fate/Apocrypha	Berserker of Black/Frankenstein's Monster, Medea	Berserker of Black/Frankenstein's Monster in Eps. 1–10, Medea in Ep. 18	
2017	UQ Holder!	Konoka Konoe		
2018	Fate/Extra Last Encore	Nursery Rhyme/Alice		
2020	Magia Record: Puella Magi Madoka Magica Side Story	Kyoko Sakura		
2020	Dropkick on My Devil!	Kraken		
2021	Chibi Maruko-chan	Reiko-chan		
2021	Kaginado	Fuko Ibuki		
2022	Girls' Frontline	416		
2023	Ninjala	Barney	Ep. 100	
2024	Demon Lord, Retry! R	XXX		
2025	Turkey! Time to Strike	Azuki	Eps. 3-6, 11-12	
2026	Great Detective Conan	Sachiyo Yumemiya	Eps. 1190-1191	

=== Theatrical animation ===
List of voice performances in theatrical animation
Year	Title	Role	Notes	Source
2002	Kinnikuman II Sei: Muscle Ginseng Competition! The Great Choujin War	Keiko		
2011	Mahō Sensei Negima: Anime Final	Konoka Konoe		
2012	Puella Magi Madoka Magica: Beginnings	Kyoko Sakura		
2012	Puella Magi Madoka Magica: Eternal	Kyoko Sakura		
2013	Puella Magi Madoka Magica: Rebellion	Kyoko Sakura		
2024	Doraemon: Nobita's Earth Symphony	Classmate		
2025	Gintama on Theater 2D: Kabukicho Four Devas Arc	Pirako Doromizu		
2026	Puella Magi Madoka Magica: Walpurgisnacht: Rising	Kyoko Sakura		

=== Original video animation (OVA) ===
List of voice performances in original video animation
Year	Title	Role	Notes	Source
2003	Submarine 707R	Rei		
2004	Tenbatsu! Angel Rabbie	Lui		
2005	Iriya no Sora, UFO no Natsu	Iriya Kana		
2006	Negina! Spring Special!?	Konoka Konoe		
2006	Negima! Summer Special!?	Konoka Konoe		
2008	Goku Sayonara Zetsubō Sensei	Kafuka Fuura		
2009	Master of Martial Hearts	Miko Kazuki		
2012	Detective Conan: The Miracle of Excalibur	Minae		

=== Video games ===
- 12Riven – Myū Takae
- Another Eden – Myunfa
- Ape Escape 3 – Sayaka
- Arknights – Glaucus
- Atelier Annie: Alchemists of Sera Island – Annie Eilenberg
- Azur Lane - Honoka
- Blaze Union: Story to Reach the Future – Emilia and Pamela
- Clannad – Fuko Ibuki
- Code 18 – Hikari Haruna
- Cross Edge – Meu
- Dead or Alive 5 Last Round – Honoka
- Dead or Alive 6 – Honoka
- Dead or Alive Xtreme 3 – Honoka
- Dead or Alive Xtreme Venus Vacation – Honoka
- Dengeki Gakuen RPG: Cross of Venus – Kana Iriya, Kanade Takatsuki
- Dragon Ball Xenoverse – Time Patroller (Female 4)
- Dragon Ball Xenoverse 2 – Time Patroller (Female 4)
- Dynasty Warriors 7 – Bao Sanniang
- Epic Seven - Alencia
- Fate/Extra – Caster (Nursery Rhyme), Alice
- Fate/Extra Record – Alice
- Fate/Grand Order – Mary Read, Medea [Lily], Nursery Rhyme, Frankenstein's Monster
- Final Fantasy Type-0 – Aria
- Food Fantasy (2018) – Apple Pie
- Food Girls 2: Civil War – Long'er
- Girls' Frontline – HK416
- Gloria Union – Locomoco and Pamela
- Granblue Fantasy – Karteira, Konoka Konoe
- Grand Chase: Dimensional Chaser - Myung Hwarin
- Magia Record – Kyouko Sakura
- Mana Khemia: Alchemists of Al-Revis – Lene Kier
- Mega Man X: Command Mission – Cinnamon
- Memories Off: Yubikiri no Kioku – Orihime Hoshitsuki
- NieR Replicant – Yonah
- Puella Magi Madoka Magica Portable – Kyouko Sakura
- Puyo Puyo Quest - Kyouko Sakura
- Riviera: The Promised Land – Serene
- Rune Factory: A Fantasy Harvest Moon – Tori or Torte
- Senran Kagura: Peach Beach Splash – Honoka
- Shining Force EXA – Catheana
- Shining Wind – Mao
- The King of Fighters All Star – Honoka
- The King of Fighters EX2: Howling Blood – Miu Kurosaki
- The Legend of Heroes: Trails of Cold Steel – Towa Herschel
- The Legend of Heroes: Trails Through Daybreak II – Towa Herschel
- Tokyo Xanadu – Towa Kokonoe
- Toukiden: The Age of Demons – Hatsuho
- Venus Vacation Prism: Dead or Alive Xtreme – Honoka
- Warriors All-Stars – Honoka
- WarTech: Senko No Ronde – Baek Changpo
- Wrestle Angels: Survivor – Cutie Kanai, Noel Shiraishi
- Xenoblade Chronicles 2 – Tora
- Xenosaga Episode II: Jenseits von Gut und Böse – 100-Series Realian
- Yakuza 5 – Azusa Osawa
- Yggdra Union: We'll Never Fight Alone – Pamela and Emilia
- Ys: The Oath in Felghana – Elena Stoddart

=== Drama CD ===
2009

- Koroshiya San – Kyuu Onna san
- Toradora! Drama CD Vol. 2 – Kihara Maya
- Drama CD Himawari – Ariesu
- Drama CD Persona – Ayase Yuka
- Bouso Rettou Seishun Hen – Chihou no Jidai ga Yatte Kita! – Higuchi Kyouko
- Transistor Teaset – Denki Gairozu – Ooshiro Kagami
- Yggdra Unison – Pamela, Emilia

2010

- MM! – Shizuka Sado

2011

- Puella Magi Madoka Magica – Kyoko Sakura

=== Dubbing ===
==== Live-action ====
- The Spy Next Door – Nora

==== Animation ====
- Chuggington – Koko
- High Guardian Spice – Sage

== Discography ==
=== Singles ===
Release date	Title
December 28, 2005	Yume no Drive
October 4, 2006	Tokimeki no Kotoba (トキメキの言葉)
October 4, 2006	Love Messenger
August 8, 2007	Cheer Ruuga! (チアルーガ!)
September 9, 2007	Koi no Museum (恋のミュージアム)
October 10, 2007	Ureshinaki (ウレシ泣キ)
January 14, 2009	Datte Anata Wa Anata Da Kara

=== Albums ===
Release date	Title
February 1, 2006	Ai no Uta
December 6, 2006	Shiawase no Iro
March 12, 2008	Namida no Kiseki
April 22, 2009	Supplement

=== Compilation albums ===
Release date	Title
January 27, 2010	Airenjā

=== DVDs ===
- Ai Pon the Films (Released March 3, 2007)
- Ai Nonaka's "No Tear x No Live 2008" (Released August 6, 2008)
