= Ai no Uta (Words of Love) =

Single by Haruka Chisuga

from the album Try!
- B-side: "Lonely Feather"; "Ai no Taiyou"
- Released: April 27, 2016
- Recorded: 2016
- Genre: EDM
- Length: 4:26
- Label: Flying Dog; Victor Entertainment
- Songwriters: Yamada Toshiaki, Rasmus Faber
- Producer: Rasmus Faber

Haruka Chisuga singles chronology
| "Je Je T'aime Communication" (2015) | "Ai no Uta (Words of Love)" (2016) |

"Ai no Uta (Words of Love)" (Japanese: 愛の詩 (words of love); "Love Poem (words of love)") is a song recorded by Japanese recording artist Haruka Chisuga, taken from her debut studio album Try! (2016). It was released as the fifth single from the album by Victor Entertainment and their subsidiary label Flying Dog on April 27, 2016. The lyrics were written by Yamada Toshiaki and the music was composed and produced by Swedish electronic dance musician Rasmus Faber. Musically, "Ai no Uta (Words of Love)" is an electronic dance song with a four on the floor beat that features synthesizers and string arrangements in its instrumentation.

Upon its release, it received positive reviews from music critics. Some complimented the composition, noting a departure from her previous J-pop influenced music, and commended the songwriting. Commercially, the song fared better in Japan than her previous releases, peaking at number 47 on the Oricon Singles Chart. An accompanying music video was directed by Nozomi Tanaka, which featured Chisuga in a large aquarium surrounded by bright lights. To promote the single, Chisuga appeared on radio stations throughout Japan including Rajira Sunday and Hiroshi Kamiya's All Night, and was used as the closing theme song for the second season of Japanese anime television series, The Asterisk War.

== Background and release ==
On October 4, 2015, it was confirmed through Anime News Network that Chisuga was to voice over the character Sylvia Lyyneheym for the second season of Japanese anime television series, The Asterisk War. However, Chisuga did not comment about a potential theme song recording for the show. Then in February 2016, Chisuga confirmed that a new song, titled "Ai no Uta (Words of Love)", would serve as the show's ending theme song. "Ai no Uta (Words of Love)" was written by Yamada Toshiaki and produced by Swedish electronic dance musician Rasmus Faber. Musically, it is an electronic dance song with a four on the floor beat, and it incorporates an "elegant" string section, as described by a staff member at CD Journal.

The single was released as the album's fifth single by Flying Dog, a subsidiary label owned by Victor Entertainment, on April 27, 2016. It was released on a CD single in Japan, which included the track, two B-side songs "Lonely Feather" and "Ai no Taiyou", and an a cappella version of "Lonely Feather". It also included the instrumental versions of the first three tracks. The digital EP included the four recordings but omitted the instrumental versions. Through CDJapan.com, pre-ordered versions of the CD single included a large B2-sized poster and a scanned hand-written letter by Chisuga herself, which was then signed.

== Reception ==
Upon its release, it received positive reviews from music critics. A staff member at Amazon.com complimented Faber's production and arrangement, who believed he was able to "expand" Chisuga's sound outside of J-pop. The reviewer also complimented the songwriting and her vocal performance. In a similar review, a CD Journal staff member praised Chisuga's "free" and "vigorous" vocal performance, alongside its "glossy" production. The review concluded with the reviewer calling it "highly polished".

Commercially, the song fared better in Japan than her previous releases. It debuted at number 47 on the Oricon Singles Chart, her highest selling entry and first top 50 single since "Planet Cradle" / "Wandering" in 2013; it sold 1,462 units. Despite falling outside of the top 50 the following week, it lasted eight weeks inside the top 200. As of June 2016, "Ai no Uta (Words of Love)" is her second best selling single according to Oricon Style.

== Promotion ==
To promote the single, Chisuga appeared on several radio stations in Japan including Rajira Sunday and Hiroshi Kamiya's All Night radio show through Nippon Broadcasting System. She also held a live event to promote the single in Osaka, Japan, May 2015. Then throughout early-mid May 2016, Chisuga visited the Japanese music store Animate in cities Yokohama, Nagoya, Kyoto, Sannomiya, and Osaka, and signed autographs. She then followed up by visiting stores Namba Shop and Akiba Sofmap in Japan. On July 9, Chisuga will perform "Ai no Uta (Words of Love)" for the first time, in order to promote the single. An accompanying music video was directed by Nozomi Tanaka. It was shot in an aquarium, and included Chisuga sitting down and observing several fishes. Along with this, she was surrounded by several glow lights and spot lights. It was released on YouTube by Victor Entertainment, Chisuga's parent label, and premiered through Japanese music television on April 8, 2016.

== Personnel ==
Credits adapted from the CD liner notes of "Ai no Uta (Words of Love)".

Recording and management

- Recorded in 2016. Management and record label Flying Dog and Victor Entertainment.

Credits

- Haruka Chisuga – vocals, background vocals
- Yamada Toshiaki – songwriting (track 1)
- Yūho Iwasato – songwriting (track 3)
- Rasmus Faber – songwriting (track 2), production, arranging, composing
- Nozomi Tanaka – music video director

== Track listings and formats ==
CD single / digital download
| No. | Title | Lyrics | Music | Arrangement | Length |
|---|---|---|---|---|---|
| 1. | "Ai no Uta (Words of Love)" (愛の詩 (words of love)) | Yamada Toshiaki | Rasmus Faber | Faber | 4:26 |
| 2. | "Lonely Feather" | Faber | Faber | Faber | 1:45 |
| 3. | "Ai no Taiyou" (愛の太陽) | Yūho Iwasato | Faber | Faber | 4:12 |
| 4. | "Lonely Feather" (Acapella version) | Faber | Faber | Faber | 2:01 |
| 5. | "Ai no Uta (Words of Love)" (愛の詩 (words of love) [Instrumental]) | Toshiaki | Faber | Faber | 4:26 |
| 6. | "Lonely Feather" (Instrumental) | Faber | Faber | Faber | 1:45 |
| 7. | "Ai no Taiyou" (愛の太陽 [Instrumental]) | Iwasato | Faber | Faber | 4:12 |
| Total length: | | | | | 12:25 |

== Charts ==
=== Weekly charts ===
| Chart (2016) | Peak position |
|---|---|
| Japan Weekly Chart (Oricon) | 47 |

=== Rankings chart ===
| Chart (2016) | Peak position |
|---|---|
| Japan Profile (Oricon) | 2 |

=== Sales ===
| Region | Certification | Certified units/sales |
|---|---|---|
| Japan (RIAJ) | — | 1,462 |

== Release history ==
| Region | Date | Format | Label |
|---|---|---|---|
| Japan | April 27, 2016 | CD | Flying Dog; Victor Entertainment |
| Japan | April 27, 2016 | Digital download | Flying Dog; Victor Entertainment |
