= Shiawase No Iro =

Shiawase No Iro (しあわせのいろ)

Studio album by Ai Nonaka (野中藍)
- Released: (Japan) 6 December 2006
- Genre: J-pop
- Label: Starchild
- Producer: Ootsuki Toshimichi (大月俊倫)

Ai Nonaka (野中藍) chronology
Ai no Uta (2006)	Shiawase No Iro (しあわせのいろ) (2006)	Namida no Kiseki (2008)

Shiawase No Iro is the second studio album by Ai Nonaka (野中藍), released on 6 December 2006.

== Track listing ==
1. Andante (アンダンテ)
2. espresso
3. Tokimeki no Kotoba (トキメキの言葉)
4. Yukina Miki (ゆきなみき)
5. Yoake no Charm (夜明けのチャーム)
6. Number
7. Barairo no Hoho (ばら色の頬)
8. Co.lor.fu.l (カ・ラ・フ・ル)
9. Jewelry Heart
10. Shiawase no Tane (幸せの種)
11. Marble no Koi (マーブルの恋)
12. LOVE@MESSENGER
