= Love Theme =

Love Theme may refer to:

== Music ==
- "Love's Theme" by the Love Unlimited Orchestra, 1973
- "The Love Theme" by John Barry from Dances with Wolves (soundtrack), 1990
- "Love Theme" by Carmine Coppola from the soundtrack of Apocalypse Now Redux, 2001
- "Love Theme" by Danny Elfman from Batman (score), 1989
- "Love Theme" by Manfred Mann from Up the Junction (soundtrack), 1968
- "Love Theme" by Ennio Morricone from the soundtrack of Cinema Paradiso, 1988
- "Love Theme" by Shogo Sakai from the soundtrack of Mother 3, 2006
- The love theme of Romeo and Juliet (Tchaikovsky), first published in 1870 by Pyotr Ilyich Tchaikovsky
- "Love Theme" by Vangelis from Blade Runner (soundtrack), 1994
- "Love Theme from Closer to Grey" by Chromatics, 2019
- "Love Theme from The Godfather" by Nino Rota, 1972
- "Love Theme from KISS" from Kiss (Kiss album), 1974
- "Love Theme from Oliver’s Story" by Francis Lai from the soundtrack of Oliver's Story, 1978
- "Love Theme from Romeo and Juliet" by Nino Rota, 1969
- "Love Theme from The Sandpiper" by Jack Sheldon, 1965
- "Love Theme from A Star Is Born" by Barbra Streisand, 1976
- "Love Theme from St. Elmo's Fire" by David Foster, 1985
- "Love Theme from Sunflower" by Henry Mancini from the soundtrack of Sunflower (1970 film)
- "Love Theme from Superman" by John Williams from the music of Superman, 1979
- "Love Theme from True Stories" by David Byrne from Sounds from True Stories, 1986
- "Love Theme from Twin Peaks" by Angelo Badalamenti from Soundtrack from Twin Peaks, 1990
- "The Man Who Married a Robot / Love Theme" by The 1975, 2018

== See also ==
- Love song
- Theme music
