= Love Sign (disambiguation) =

"Love Sign" is a 1994 song by Nona Gaye and Prince.

Love Sign may also refer to:

- Love Sign (horse) (foaled 1977), racehorse
- Love Sign (album), by Free Energy, 2013
- Love Sign, an EP by Laboum, 2016
- The LOVE sculpture at LOVE Park in Philadelphia, PA, which in turn is based on the Love pop art image

== See also ==
- Love Signs, a 2021 album by the Jungle Giants
