= Greatest Love Songs =

Greatest Love Songs may refer to:

- Greatest Love Songs (Joe Cocker album), a 2003 compilation album by Joe Cocker
- Greatest Love Songs (Frank Sinatra album), a 2002 compilation album by American singer Frank Sinatra
- Greatest Love Songs Vol. 666, the debut album by Finnish band Him
- The Greatest Love Songs of All Time, a 2010 album by Barry Manilow
