= Ai no Uta (album) =

Ai No Uta (あいのうた)

Studio album by Ai Nonaka (野中藍)
- Released: (Japan) 1 February 2006
- Genre: J-pop
- Label: Starchild
- Producer: Ootsuki Toshimichi (大月俊倫)

Ai Nonaka (野中藍) chronology
Ai No Uta (あいのうた) (2006)	Shiawase No Iro (2006)

Ai no Uta is the first studio album by Ai Nonaka (野中藍), released on 1 February 2006.

== Track listing ==
1. Hatsukoi Frill (初恋フリル)
2. Yume no Drive (夢のドライブ)
3. Snow White Graffiti (スノー・ホワイト・グラフィティ)
4. Peace! (ピース！)
5. Kaze no Radio (風のラジオ)
6. Kuroneko no Hitomi (黒猫の瞳)
7. Hajimete no Nichiyoubi (はじめての日曜日)
8. Escalator Rider (エスカレーターライダー)
9. fairy
10. ai no uta (アイノウタ)
11. epilogue -ai no uta- (epilogue 〜あいのうた〜)
