= Love Songs (Johnny Gill album) =

Greatest hits album by Johnny Gill
- Released: January 11, 2005
- Recorded: 1990–1996
- Genre: Contemporary R&B
- Length: 57:31
- Label: Motown
- Producer: Various

Johnny Gill chronology
The Millennium Collection: The Best of Johnny Gill (2003)	Love Songs (2005)

Professional ratings
Review scores
Source	Rating
AllMusic	3.5/5 stars

Love Songs is a compilation album of love songs by singer Johnny Gill, which includes material from Johnny Gill (1990), Provocative (1993), Let's Get The Mood Right (1996), as well as New Edition's Heartbreak (1988), and the soundtracks for New Jack City (1991) and Mo' Money (1992).

== Track listing ==
1. "My, My, My"
2. "Lady Dujour"
3. "Let's Spend the Night"
4. "Mastersuite"
5. "I Got You"
6. "Quiet Time to Play"
7. "Someone to Love"
8. "Let's Get the Mood Right"
9. "It's Your Body" (Mario Winans Remix) (Feat. Roger Troutman)
10. "Can You Stand the Rain"
11. "I'm Still Waiting"
12. "Let's Just Run Away"

== Album credits ==
- Johnny Gill – Producer, Vocal Arrangement, Liner Notes
- Nathan Morris – Producer
- Wanya Morris – Producer
- Randy Ran – Producer
- Babyface – Producer
- Daryl Simmons – Producer
- Shawn Stockman – Producer
- Harry Weinger – Compilation Producer
- Lance Alexander – Producer, Vocal Arrangement, Rhythm Arrangements
- Ellen Fitton – Digital Remastering
- Vartan – Art Direction
- Prof. T. – Producer, Rhythm Arrangements, Vocal Arrangement
- Dana Smart – Compilation Producer
- Albert Watson – Photography
- Pamela Springsteen – Photography
- Rebecca Meek – Design
- Eddie Wolfl – Photography
- Ryan Null – Photo Research
- Shannon Steckloff – Production Coordination
- Kevin Anders – Producer
- R. Kelly – Arranger, Producer
- Kayo – Producer
- Jimmy Jam – Producer, Vocal Arrangement
- Terry Lewis – Producer, Vocal Arrangement
- Boyz II Men – Vocals (Background)
- Kenny G – Saxophone, Soloist, Guest Appearance
