= Rasmus Faber =

Swedish musician (born 1979)

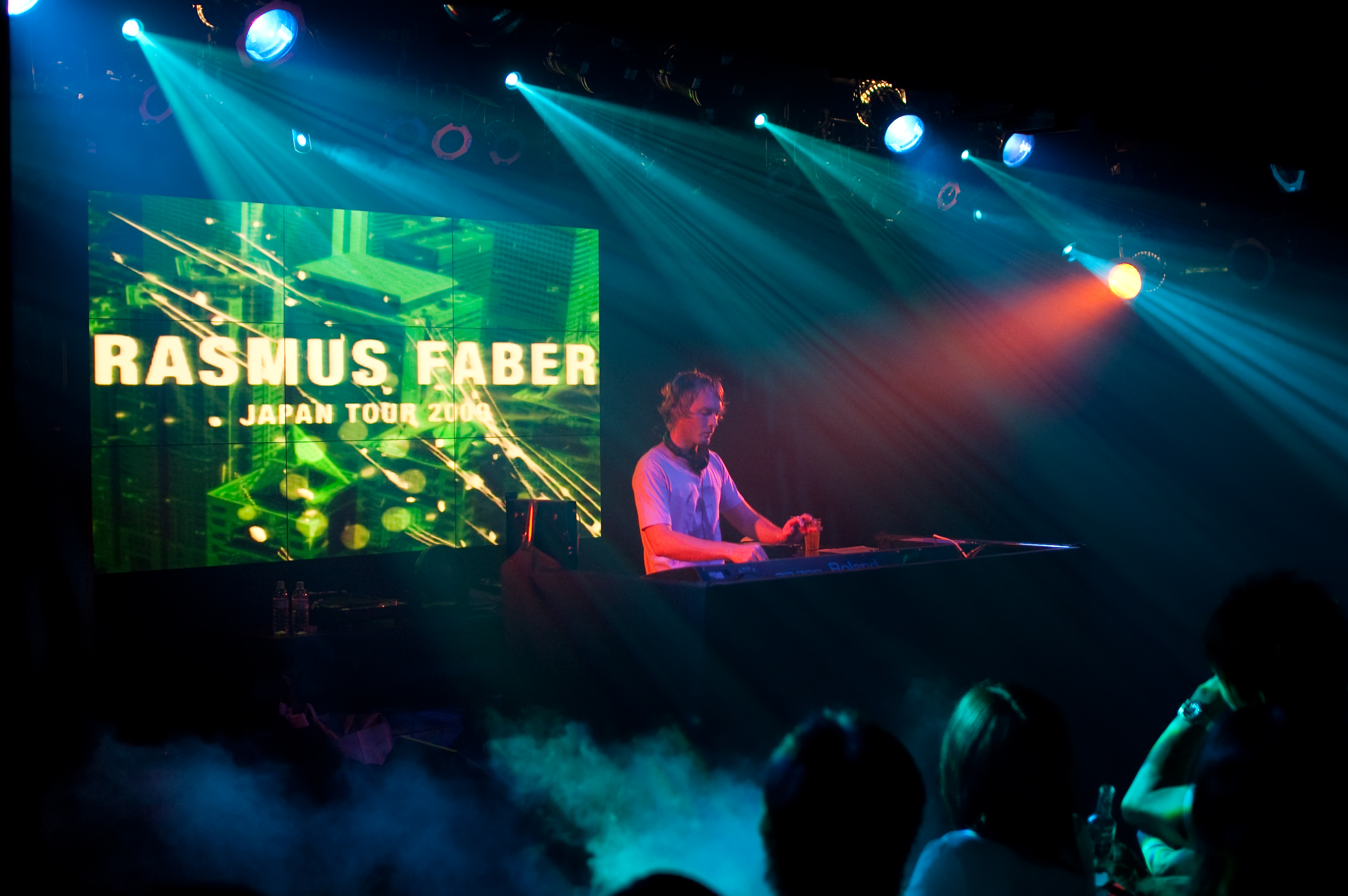
- Rasmus Faber performing in Japan

Background information
- Birth name: Rasmus Peter Faber
- Born: 16 May 1979 (age 46); Stockholm, Sweden
- Genres: House Music, Jazz
- Occupations: Pianist; Composer
- Years active: 1999–present
- Labels: Farplane Records
- Website: rasmusfaber.com

Rasmus Peter Faber (born 16 May 1979) is a Swedish pianist, DJ, remixer, composer, record producer, sound engineer, and founder of the record label Farplane Records. He is notable in the electronic dance music genre, and performs solo as a DJ and pianist, and live with his band the RaFa Orchestra. Over the last decade, Faber has become better known as a composer of music for anime, computer games, advertising, and virtual reality worlds.

== Early life ==
Following his musical education, Faber started working as a session musician, pianist, and musical director for local acts in Sweden.

=== Producer career ===
In 2002, Faber released his first collaboration single "Never Felt So Fly" with Melo produced by British record label Black Vinyl Records. After its success, his career and reputation grew quickly, and Rasmus started collaborating with big dance label Defected Records, and achieved further success and notoriety with his remix of Junior Jack's E Samba. The first single on the label was "Ever After" featuring singer Emily McEwan, which was a successful club hit worldwide.

Over the last decade, Faber has become producer of exotic instruments (and performers), including the nyckelharpa and tongue drum (used on YouTube virtual celebrity project Artiswitch). His down-tempo single, "Be Real", has become his most popular release to date with more than 24 million streams on Spotify and counting.

=== RaFa Orchestra ===
Since 2009, Faber has been playing his songs live, together with a group of ten musicians and singers forming the RaFa Orchestra. Selected venues they have played include Billboard Live Tokyo/Osaka; Java Jazz Festival, Jakarta, Indonesia; the Southport Weekender Festival.

== Discography ==
=== Music department ===
Year	Work	Type	Job	Episodes	Ref.
2024	Spice and Wolf: Merchant Meets the Wise Wolf	TV Series	music coordinator	16	
2024	Trapezium		music coordinator		
2021	Moriarty the Patriot	TV Series	theme music composer	13	
2020	D4DJ Groovy Mix	Video Game	composer additional music		
2019	Ensemble Stars!	TV Series	composer additional music		
2018	Takunomi	TV Series	theme music composer	12	
2017	Arcaea	Video Game	composer additional music		
2015 – 2016	The Asterisk War	TV Series	Lyrics and music: "Hold You in the Wind"; Vocals: "Hold You in the Wind"; Music: ending theme lyrics and music: "Lonely Feather"; Lyrics and music: ending theme Music: "Ai no Taiyō"	24	
2015	Gourmet Girl Graffiti	TV Mini Series	theme music composer	12	
2012	Lagrange: The Flower of Rin-ne	TV Series	theme music composer	24	

=== Composer ===
Year	Work	Type	Episodes	Ref.
2021	AMAIM Warrior at the Borderline	TV Series	13	
2021	ArtisWitch	TV Series	6	
2020	The Multiverse Bakery: Tales from Soda Island, Chapter 1	Short		
2018	Harukana Receive	TV Mini Series	12	
2015 - 2016	The Asterisk War	TV Series		

== Awards and nominations ==
Year	Award	Category	Notes	Work	Result	Ref.
2024	Hollywood Music in Media Awards HMMA Award	Best Song/Score - Mobile Video Game	Shared with: Robbie Say, Martin Landström, Matthew Carl Earl, Laurent Courbier, Henrik Lindström, Volker Bertelmann, 2WEI	Honor of Kings	Won	
2016	Anime Trending Awards Annual Award	Best in Soundtrack	5th place	The Asterisk War	Nominated	
