= Haruka Chisuga =

Japanese voice actress and singer

- 千菅 春香
- Born: January 23, 1992 (age 34); Morioka, Iwate Prefecture, Japan
- Occupations: Voice actress; singer
- Years active: 2013–present
- Agent: Fortunerest
- Notable work: Shirobako as Shizuka Sakaki; Angels of Death (video game) as Rachel "Ray" Gardner; The Asterisk War as Sylvia Ryuneheim; Girls Beyond the Wasteland as Sayuki Kuroda
- Height: 157 cm (5 ft 2 in)
- Musical career
- Genres: J-pop; anison
- Instrument: Vocals
- Label: Flying Dog
- Website: haruka-chisuga.net

Haruka Chisuga (千菅 春香, Chisuga Haruka; born January 23, 1992) is a Japanese voice actress and singer from Morioka, Iwate Prefecture affiliated with the agency Fortunerest. As a singer, she is signed to Victor Entertainment under their label Flying Dog.

== Biography ==
During her early childhood, Chisuga took classical piano lessons. During high school, Chisuga decided to become a voice actress and singer after seeing a video of Nana Mizuki performing. She was discovered in 2012 after winning the Miss Macross 30 contest, which was held to celebrate the 30th anniversary of the Macross franchise. She played her first main role as Shizuka Sakaki in the 2014 anime television series Shirobako.

== Filmography ==
=== Television animation ===
2013

- Ore no Imōto ga Konna ni Kawaii Wake ga Nai. as Fairy (ep 5)
- Strike the Blood as D-Type, Yuko Tanahara (ep 5&10)
- Tamayura: More Aggressive as Junior (ep 12), School trip student (ep 8.5)
- White Album 2 as Tomo's Friend (ep 7), Tsukumi (ep 1)

2014

- Amagi Brilliant Park as Shiina Chūjō
- Blue Spring Ride as schoolgirl
- Lord Marksman and Vanadis as Child (eps 5&13), Maid (ep 1)
- Love Live! 2nd Season as Classmate
- M3 the dark metal as Tasaki, Mukuro
- Shirobako as Shizuka Sakaki, Lucy Weller (ep 24)
- Soul Eater Not! as Tsugumi Harudori
- Yona of the Dawn as Court lady (ep 1), Girl (ep 22), young Kija (ep 10), Wind Clan member (ep 4), Woman (ep 17), Young lady (ep 21)

2015

- Gourmet Girl Graffiti as Hina Yamazaki, Announcer (ep 4)
- Go! Princess PreCure as Hanae Komori
- Seraph of the End as young Mikaela (ep 1), little girl (eps 7,8)
- Wish Upon the Pleiades as Theater Festival Announcer (ep 5)
- Hibike! Euphonium as Kitauji concert band member (eps 2,3,4 & 10), Kohaku Kawashima (ep 8)
- Aquarion Logos as Kokone Kikogami
- The Idolmaster Cinderella Girls 2nd Season as Ryo Matsunaga
- The Asterisk War as Sylvia Ryuneheim
- Heavy Object as Girl (ep 6)

2016

- Girls Beyond the Wasteland as Sayuki Kuroda
- Haruchika as Miyoko Narushima
- Myriad Colors Phantom World as Contest of Strength Phantom (ep 3)
- Korogashi-ya no pun as Hotaru
- The Asterisk War 2nd Season as Sylvia Ryuneheim
- Alderamin on the Sky as Haroma Bekker

2017

- Miss Kobayashi's Dragon Maid as Girl
- Tsuki ga Kirei as Miu Imazu
- The Idolmaster Cinderella Girls Theater as Ryo Matsunaga

2018

- Angels of Death as Rachel
- The Seven Deadly Sins: Revival of the Commandments as Zaneri

2019

- Is It Wrong to Try to Pick Up Girls in a Dungeon? II as Sanjōno Haruhime
- Tenka Hyakken ~Meiji-kan e Yōkoso!~ as Goō Yoshimitsu

2020

- Is It Wrong to Try to Pick Up Girls in a Dungeon? III as Sanjōno Haruhime

2021

- Blue Reflection Ray as Ruka Hanari

2022

- Eternal Boys as Pepechan
- Is It Wrong to Try to Pick Up Girls in a Dungeon? IV as Sanjōno Haruhime

=== OVA/OAD ===
- Zetsumetsu Kigu Shōjo Amazing Twins (2014) as Mana
- Amagi Brilliant Park (2015) as Shiina Chūjō
- Akatsuki no Yona (2015) as young Kija

=== ONA ===
- 7 Seeds (2019) as Koruri

=== Anime films ===
- The Laws of the Universe Part 0 (2015) as Natsumi
- Sound! Euphonium: The Movie – Welcome to the Kitauji High School Concert Band (2016) as Brass Band Member
- Pretty Cure Dream Stars! Movie (2017) as Komori Hanae
- Human Lost (2019) as Tsuneko
- Shirobako: The Movie (2020) as Shizuka Sakaki

=== Video games ===
2013

- Macross 30: Voices across the Galaxy (PlayStation 3) as Mina Forte

2014

- Soul Eater x Soul Eater Not!〜Satsubatsu? Ukiuki? Card Battle!〜 as Harudori Tsugumi
- Heroes Placement as Chie Miyazawa

2015

- The Idolmaster Cinderella Girls as Ryo Matsunaga
- The Idolmaster Cinderella Girls: Starlight Stage as Ryo Matsunaga
- Chō Ginga Sendan (PC game) as Yūko Hoshi

2016

- Ensemble Girls! as Konan Yako
- The Asterisk War Festa Kirameki no Stella as Lyyneheym Sylvia
- The Asterisk War Festa Houka Kenran as Lyyneheym Sylvia
- Quiz RPG: The World of Mystic Wiz as Noin Kera
- Girls Beyond the Wasteland as Kuroda Sayuki
- Rage of Bahamut as Imera
- Neji-maki Seirei Senki Amekagami no Alderamin ROAD OF ROYAL KNIGHTS as Haroma Becker
- MacrossΔScramble as Mina Forte
- Megami Meguri as Amenosagume
- Yamato Chronicle Sousei as Himiko
- Yome Collection as Sakaki Shizuka

2017

- Damnachi -Cross・Isutoria- as Sanjouno Haruki
- Tenge Hyaku Ken - Ki - as Goou Yoshimitsu
- Mon Musume ☆ wa 〜 Remu as Ashley

2018

- Identity V as Rachel Gardner (Angels of Death collab)

2020

- Hypnosis Mic -Alternative Rap Battle- as Amiria Nakiri

2022

- Arknights as Rockrock

== Discography ==
=== Singles ===
Release date	Title	Peak Oricon chart position	Album
February 27, 2013	Planet Cradle/Wonder Ring	#38	TRY!
March 20, 2013	Kibou no Hana (希望の花)	#22	TRY!
February 26, 2014	Zetsumetsuki gu Shōjo! (絶滅危愚少女!)	#167	TRY!
July 23, 2014	Momoiro Fantasy (桃色ファンタジー)	#97	TRY!
July 22, 2015	Ju Je t'aime Communication (ジュ・ジュテーム・コミュニケーション)	#75	TRY!
April 27, 2016	Ai no Uta -words of love- (愛の詩-words of love-)	#47	TRY!

=== Albums ===
Year	Album details	Peak Oricon chart positions
2016	TRY!: Released: June 22, 2016; Label: FlyingDog; Format: CD	47
"—" denotes releases that did not chart.
