= Jun Hatanaka =

Japanese manga artist

Jun Hatanaka 畑中 純
- Born: March 20, 1950 Kokura, Japan
- Died: June 13, 2012 (aged 62) Chōfu, Japan
- Area: Manga artist
- Notable works: Mandaraya no Ryouta

Jun Hatanaka (Japanese: 畑中 純, Hepburn: Hatanaka Jun; March 20, 1950 – June 13, 2012) was a Japanese manga artist and woodblock artist. Born in Kokura, Fukuoka Prefecture, Tsukiyo (月夜) marked his debut as a professional manga artist in 1977. Two years later, his most well-known work, Mandaraya no Ryouta, began to be published in Jitsugyo no Nihon Sha's Weekly Manga Sunday magazine. He also served as an instructor in Tokyo Polytechnic University's Department of Manga before he died on June 13, 2012, from an abdominal aortic aneurysm in Chōfu, Tokyo.

== Works ==
- Mandaraya no Ryouta (まんだら屋の良太) (Weekly Manga Sunday, Jitsugyo no Nihon Sha)
- Genkai Yūkyōden Saburōmaru (玄海遊侠伝 三郎丸) (Weekly Manga Sunday, Jitsugyo no Nihon Sha)
- Hyaku Hachi no Koi (百八の恋) (Weekly Morning, Kodansha)
- Obake (オバケ) (Weekly Morning, Kodansha)
- Risō Miya (理想宮) (Big Gold, Shogakukan)
- Dai Tama Tsukiyo (大多摩月夜) (Big Gold, Shogakukan)
- Orokamono no Hakuen (愚か者の楽園) (Shōsetsu Shinchō, Shinchosha)
- Gaki (ガキ) (Comic Tom, Ushio Shuppan)
- Ryouta (良太) (Monthly Comic Bingo, Bungeishunjū)
- Gokudō Mon (極道モン) (Jitsuwajidai, Media Boy)
- Gataro (ガタロ) (Garo, Seirindō)
