= The Laughing Salesman =

Japanese manga series

- First bunkobon volume cover

笑ゥせぇるすまん (Warau Sērusuman)
- Genre: Black comedy; Psychological thriller
- Manga

The Black Salesman (one-shot)
- Written by: Fujiko Fujio (Note: Motoo Abiko alone)
- Published by: Shogakukan
- Magazine: Big Comic
- Published: 1968
- Manga

The Black Salesman
- Written by: Fujiko Fujio
- Published by: Jitsugyo no Nihon Sha
- Magazine: Manga Sunday
- Original run: 1969 – 1971
- Volumes: 2
Further information
Anime television series
The Laughing Salesman
Directed by	Toshirō Kuni (chief); Yoshitomo Yonetani
Produced by	Sōichi Besshi; Seitarō Kodama; Hiroshi Inoue
Written by	Yasuo Tanami
Music by	Kōhei Tanaka
Studio	Shin-Ei Animation
Original network	JNN (TBS)
Original run	Original run October 10, 1989 – September 29, 1992; Specials; December 26, 1992 – December 28, 1993
Episodes	127
Manga
The Laughing Salesman
Written by	Fujiko Fujio A
Published by	Chuokoron-Shinsha
Magazine	Chuokoron
Original run	1990 – 1995
Volumes	5 (Note: Including the previously uncollected chapters from The Black Salesman.)
Manga
The Salesman Returns
Written by	Fujiko Fujio A
Published by	Jitsugyo no Nihon Sha
Magazine	Manga Sunday
Original run	1996 – 2000
Volumes	2
Television drama
Directed by	Mitsuo Ezaki; Takahito Hara; Hiroshi Ikezoe; Gō Nakajima; Kyōji Mafune
Produced by	Fumio Igarashi; Masaru Takahashi; Gō Nakajima
Written by	Reiko Yoshida; Natsuko Takahashi; Atsushi Maekawa
Music by	Kōji Endō (e-KLAY 1999)
Studio	TV Asahi; Cosmic Utopia Corporation
Original network	ANN (TV Asahi)
Original run	June 26, 1999 – September 18, 1999
Episodes	10
Manga
The Dancing Salesman
Written by	Fujiko Fujio A
Published by	Jitsugyo no Nihon Sha
Magazine	Manga Sunday
Original run	2001 – 2004
Anime television series
New Laughing Salesman
Directed by	Hirofumi Ogura
Written by	Naohiro Fukushima; Asami Ishikawa; Midori Natsu
Music by	Kōhei Tanaka
Studio	Shin-Ei Animation
Licensed by	NA: Crunchyroll
Original network	Tokyo MX, Yomiuri TV, BS11, Animax
Original run	April 3, 2017 – June 19, 2017
Episodes	12 (24 segments)
Television drama
Directed by	Masaaki Itō; Yōhei Osabe; Daisuke Yamamoto; Shōta Sasaki
Written by	Kankurō Kudō; Magy; Tōru Hosokawa; Udai Iwasaki
Studio	TV Tokyo
Original network	Amazon Prime Video
Original run	July 18, 2025 – August 1, 2025
Episodes	12
Video games
The Laughing Salesman (1991); The Laughing Salesman (1993)
- icon

The Laughing Salesman (Japanese: 笑ゥせぇるすまん, Hepburn: Warau Sērusuman) is a Japanese manga series created by Fujiko Fujio A. The manga "The Black Salesman" began as a one-shot manga in Shogakukan's Big Comic magazine in 1968, later serialized in Jitsugyo no Nihon Sha's Manga Sunday magazine from 1969 to 1971. It was again re-released as "The Laughing Salesman" by Chuokoron-Shinsha from 1990 to 1995. The manga tells the story of a salesman named Moguro Fukuzou, (Note: The name, with the same kanji, is read as "Mokoku Fukuzou" in The Black Salesman.) whose job is to help people fill gaps in their soul. In reality, he often ruins the lives of his clients if they do not follow his strict instructions or if they betray his trust.

An anime television series adaptation was produced by Shin-Ei Animation, directed by Toshirō Kuni and written by Yasuo Tanami. It aired on TBS from 1989 to 1993 with a total of 127 episodes. A live-action adaptation aired in 1999 while a second anime television series adaptation aired on Tokyo MX in 2017. A second live-action drama adaptation aired in 2025.

== Plot ==
Society is filled with people who struggle through their lives or never achieved their goals. The stories in the series focus on individuals who meet a shadowy and ominous salesman named Moguro Fukuzou (喪黒 福造). Moguro promises to "fill your empty soul" and give them a better life, if they follow his advice or agree to his conditions. However, once Moguro's clients begin to enjoy the fruits of their new life, they often breach their conditions, betray his trust, or deny that they received assistance at all. When this invariably happens due to their avarice, greed or selfishness, Moguro punishes his clients by using their reliance on his aid against them. With their lives ruined, he believes that they have been justly rewarded and he looks for more potential clients that he can help in a similar way.

The names of Moguro's clients are often puns on their situation or predicament, or refer to aspects of Japanese culture or history. For example, in Episode 18, the name of the client, Urashima Taichi, alludes to the legend of Urashima Tarō, a type of Japanese Rip Van Winkle.

== Media ==
=== Manga ===
Fujiko Fujio first created the manga as a one-shot called The Black Salesman (黒イせぇるすまん, Kuroi Sērusuman) in Shogakukan's Big Comic magazine in 1968. Later serialized in Jitsugyo no Nihon Sha's Manga Sunday magazine from 1969 to 1971. After the first anime adaptation's release, Fujiko Fujio A continued the series from 1990 to 1995 in Chuokoron-Shinsha's Chuokoron magazine, this time under the same title of the anime, The Laughing Salesman (笑ゥせぇるすまん, Warau Sērusuman), and later in Manga Sunday from 1996 to 2000 as The Salesman Returns (帰ッテキタせぇるすまん, Kaettekita Sērusuman), with a bilingual (Japanese and English) version released in 2013. The fourth sequel, The Dancing Salesman (踊ルせぇるすまん, Odoru Sērusuman), ran in Jitsugyo no Nihon Sha's Manga Sunday from 2001 to 2004. Both the Chuokoron-Shinsha version and The Salesman Returns have been published in both physical and digital formats, with volume 1 of the bunkobon edition of the former and volume 1 of the latter including the previously uncollected chapters from The Black Salesman.

=== Anime ===
An anime adaptation of the manga was produced by Shin-Ei Animation and aired as part of the 1989–1992 variety show Gimme a Break (ギミア・ぶれいく, Gimia・bureiku) on TBS from October 10, 1989, to September 29, 1992, and later continued as 2 hour specials which aired from December 26, 1992, to December 28, 1993. It was directed by Toshirō Kuni and written by Yasuo Tanami, while Kōhei Tanaka composed the music. The opening song is titled Kodoku no Uta (孤独の唄; lit. Song of Loneliness) while the ending is titled Kokoro no Uta (ココロの唄; lit. Song of the Heart), both performed by Tomio Umezawa.

A DVD boxed set of the series was released by Pony Canyon on March 20, 2013. The anime has also been digitally remastered and released on various video on demand streaming services in Japan.

A second anime adaptation titled New Laughing Salesman (Japanese: 笑ゥせぇるすまんNEW, Hepburn: Warau Sērusuman Nyū) was also produced by Shin-Ei Animation. It was directed by Hirofumi Ogura, with Naohiro Fukushima, Asami Ishikawa and Midori Natsu writing the scripts and Kohei Tanaka composing the music. Fujio Suzuki designed the characters and served as chief animation director. Minoru Nishida was the art director, with Akiko Inoue in charge of color design. The series aired on Tokyo MX from April 3, 2017, to June 19, 2017. It was streamed on Crunchyroll, making it first The Laughing Salesman material available online outside Japan. The opening song is titled "Don't" by NakamuraEmi while the ending theme is titled "Bam! The Time I Got Suckered" (ドーン！やられちゃった節, Dōn! Yararechatta setsu) by Junji Takada.

=== Video games ===
Compile released the first video game based on the series for the MSX2 in Japan in 1991.

A visual novel of the series was released on the Sega CD in Japan on September 17, 1993. It was also developed by Compile and published by Sega, adapting three episodes of the anime. In the game, it features fully-voiced cutscenes with 2D artwork and as they progress through, they will go through some mini-games, related to the episode (e.g. following Moguro by choosing the correct path). The player can change the outcome of the events of the customer. If the player makes the right choices, the customer can have a happy ending. However, if the player makes the wrong choices, the customer will get the bad ending, just like in the anime.

Fukuzou Moguro makes an appearance as a guest character in the 2012 game Girls RPG Cinderelife developed by Level-5 for the Nintendo 3DS.

=== Live-action drama ===
A live-action adaptation was produced by TV Asahi, which stars Shirō Itō as Moguro Fukuzou. It aired from June 26 to September 18, 1999. A second live-action adaptation was announced by Amazon Prime Video, and premiered on the streaming platform on July 18, 2025. The series stars Ryūji Akiyama as the titular character.
