= Shizukanaru Don – Yakuza Side Story =

Japanese manga series

- Cover of the first tankōbon volume, featuring Shizuya Kondou

静かなるドン (Shizukanaru Don)
- Genre: Yakuza, Comedy
- Manga
- Written by: Tatsuo Nitta
- Published by: Jitsugyo no Nihon Sha
- Magazine: Weekly Manga Sunday
- Original run: November 15, 1988 – January 8, 2013
- Volumes: 108
- Original video animation
- Directed by: Hajime Kamegaki
- Written by: Kuniaki Ashikawa
- Music by: Shinji Miyazaki
- Studio: Tokyo Movie Shinsha
- Released: April 12, 1991
- Runtime: 40 minutes

Shizukanaru Don – Yakuza Side Story (Japanese: 静かなるドン, Hepburn: Shizukanaru Don; aka. "The Quiet Don") is a Japanese manga series written and illustrated by Tatsuo Nitta, about a Yakuza boss who works in a lingerie manufacturer during the day. It started serialization in Jitsugyo no Nihon Sha's seinen magazine, Weekly Manga Sunday on November 15, 1988. The manga was licensed and published in Taiwan by Da Ran Culture before being transferred to Sun Ho Culture.

== Media ==
=== Manga ===
Jitsugyo no Nihon Sha released the first tankōbon volume of the manga on April 6, 1989. The last tankōbon, the 108th volume, was released on June 29, 2013. Jitsugyo no Nihon Sha re-released the manga in 16 bunkobon volumes between July 28, 2005, and June 25, 2006. The manga was licensed in Taiwan by Da Ran Culture up to volume 66 before it went bankrupt on March 31, 2003. Volumes 67 onwards were licensed by Sun Ho.

=== Live-action films ===
Two live-action film adaptations were released in 2000 and 2009.

In January 2023, T-Joy announced a live-action film project adaptation comprising four "episodes". The first two are set to release on May 12, while the other half will premiere a week later. They were directed by Kento Yamaguchi, who wrote the scripts with Riuji Yoshizaki.

=== Other adaptations ===
The manga was adapted into an original video animation by Tokyo Movie Shinsha. Directed by Hajime Kamegaki, it was released in Japan by Toho on April 12, 1991. It was made into a Japanese television drama series in 1994 and into a drama CD in 2010.

== Reception ==
It has sold over 45 million copies in Japan as of 2016. In 2013, it won the Grand Prize of the 42nd Japan Cartoonists Association Award as the judges declared it was an important manga to support Weekly Manga Sunday and due to its "absurdity and fun."
