= Easygoing Territory Defense by the Optimistic Lord =

Japanese light novel series

- Easygoing Territory Defense by the Optimistic Lord: Production Magic Turns a Nameless Village into the Strongest Fortified City
- First light novel volume cover

お気楽領主の楽しい領地防衛 ～生産系魔術で名もなき村を最強の城塞都市に～ (Okiraku Ryōshu no Tanoshii Ryōchi Bōei: Seisan-kei Majutsu de Na mo Nakimura o Saikyō no Jōsai Toshi ni)
- Genre: Isekai
- Novel series
- Written by: Sou Akaike
- Published by: Shōsetsuka ni Narō
- Original run: May 15, 2020 – present
- Light novel
- Written by: Sou Akaike
- Illustrated by: Kururi
- Published by: Overlap
- English publisher: NA: Seven Seas Entertainment
- Imprint: Overlap Novels
- Original run: September 25, 2021 – present
- Volumes: 10
- Manga
- Written by: Sou Akaike
- Illustrated by: Maro Aoiro
- Published by: Overlap
- English publisher: NA: Seven Seas Entertainment
- Imprint: Gardo Comics
- Magazine: Comic Gardo
- Original run: August 13, 2021 – present
- Volumes: 9
- Anime television series
- Directed by: Takayuki Kuriyama (Note: Credited as Series Director (シリーズディレクター, Shirīzu Direkutā)); Tetsuya Tatamitani
- Written by: Yutaka Yasunaga
- Music by: Kana Utatane
- Studio: NAZ
- Licensed by: Crunchyroll; SEA: Muse Communication
- Original network: Tokyo MX, BS11, SUN, AT-X, GYT, NCC, TVA, HTB
- Original run: January 10, 2026 – March 28, 2026
- Episodes: 12
- icon

Easygoing Territory Defense by the Optimistic Lord: Production Magic Turns a Nameless Village into the Strongest Fortified City (Japanese: お気楽領主の楽しい領地防衛 ～生産系魔術で名もなき村を最強の城塞都市に～, Hepburn: Okiraku Ryōshu no Tanoshii Ryōchi Bōei: Seisan-kei Majutsu de Na mo Nakimura o Saikyō no Jōsai Toshi ni) is a Japanese light novel series written by Sou Akaike and illustrated by Kururi. It began serialization on the user-generated novel publishing website Shōsetsuka ni Narō in May 2020 and is ongoing updated on Saturday mornings. It was later acquired by Overlap who began publishing it under their Overlap Novels imprint in September 2021. A manga adaptation illustrated by Maro Aoiro began serialization on Overlap's Comic Gardo manga service in August 2021. An anime television series adaptation produced by NAZ aired from January to March 2026.

== Premise ==
Van Ney Fertio is an 8-year-old prodigy. Raised so due to being the reincarnation of a well-known hero and thus born with instinctual knowledge of magic. However, when the kind of magic he manifests is creation magic, his snooty family kick him out to a small podunk village to defend. Fortunately, Van sees great potential and with the aid of several followers who still believe in him, Van believes he can turn this small village around for the better all while trying to avoid drawing attention from those who want to use his land for their own gain.

== Characters ==
Van Ney Fertio (ヴァン・ネイ・フェルティオ, Van Nei Ferutio)
Voiced by: Yumi Uchiyama
A boy from Earth who was reincarnated as the youngest son of Marquis Jalpa. Unlike his older brothers, who possess elemental magic, he possesses creation magic. His father considers him useless and had him exiled to a town that is on the verge of collapse, where he becomes its lord and attempts to revive the town.
Till (ティル, Tiru)
Voiced by: M.A.O
Van's loyal but protective maid, who is skilled with sword combat. She goes with Van to his new territory. It is hinted that she has feelings for Van.
Khamsin (カムシン, Kamushin)
Voiced by: Mariya Ise
A boy who was sold into slavery by his toxic father. After Van bought him, he became a loyal follower to Van since he treats him with respect unlike his father and also goes with him to his new home.
Panamera Carrera Cayenne (パナメラ・カレラ・カイエン, Panamera Karera Kaien)
Voiced by: Yoko Hikasa
A viscountess and Arte On Ferdinand's caretaker. She travels to assess Van's village as a potential ally or enemy, and to reluctantly introduce Arte On Ferdinand for marriage. After being impressed with Van's abilities as a lord, she encourages the relationship with Van and Arte, forms an equal alliance with Van, and becomes his liaison to the King of Scuderia. She wields powerful fire magic and has powerful sword skills.
Arte On Ferdinand (アルテ・オン・フェルディナット, Arte On Ferudinatto)
Voiced by: Shion Wakayama
A young girl who is in the care of Panamera. They have a mother and daughter-like relationship. She was exiled by her father because her Marionette Magic is widely discriminated against, including by her mother. She is brought to Van's village to be engaged to him, though she does eventually develop feelings for him. Her Marionette Magic enables her to control objects as if they were puppets. When in combat, she uses human-sized puppets that Van made for her to attack her opponents.
Esparda (エスパーダ, Esupāda)
Voiced by: Kenyu Horiuchi
Jalpa's former butler and Van's teacher, who retires so he can go with Van to his new territory to continue teaching him. He is calm and collected, but also a very strict teacher for Van. He is skilled with using Earth magic.
Dee (ディー, Dī)
Voiced by: Chikahiro Kobayashi
A knight commander who trains Van with using a sword and goes with him to his new home. His charming and energetic nature makes him overbearing to Van.
Ortho Sheet (オルト・シート, Oruto Shīto)
Voiced by: Makoto Furukawa
An adventurer who comes to respect Van after he helps defeat a gang of bandits. After their initial mission to escort Van to the village, he and his group decide to stay and continue working for Van as adventurers.
Purriel (プルリエル, Pururieru)
Voiced by: Wakana Kuramochi
A member of Ortho's group. She is a mage who wields water magic. Like Till, she may have feelings for Van.
Kusala (クサラ, Kusara)
Voiced by: Gen Satō
A member of Ortho's group. He falls in love with Flamiria after saving her.
Lada Priora (ラダ・プリオラ, Rada Puriora)
Voiced by: Nonoka Ōbuchi
A mermaid-like being called an apkallu. She and her people move to Van's village after learning of his heroic deeds. She has a crush on Van and wants to marry him.
Lada Vesta
Lada's father and the leader of the apkallu. He persists in Van marrying his daughter, and calls him "son-in-law", despite Van's objections.
Marquis Jalpa
Van's stern father, who is disappointed that he has creation magic rather than elemental magic like his brothers. He at first considers executing Van, but is instead convinced to exile him to a rundown town where he will become its lord. He can use fire magic.
Murcia, Jard, and Sesto
Van's older brothers, who possess elemental magic. It was Murcia who convinced his father to exile Van instead of killing him, showing that he cares for Van unlike the rest of his family.
Rosalie
A nun from the Mary Chamber of Commerce who can wield magic.
Arb and Law
Two knights who accompany Van to his new territory.
Ronda
The chief of Van's village.
Bell and Rango
Two merchants from the Mary Chamber of Commerce. They set up shop in Van's village.
Dino En Tsora Bellrinet
The king of Scuderia.
Aperta
Dino's chancellor.
Flamiria
A woman who lost her home and father. After Kusala saves her from monsters, she falls in love with him and moves to Van's village.
Uinmog
The eighth prince of the Yelenetta kingdom, who was sent to launch and attack on Van's village. He is very arrogant and hot-tempered. However, he ends up being captured as he had highly underestimated Van's power.
Bariatt Shirocco Ferdinand
A count and Arte's father. He can also use magic.
Sharon Tora Ferdinand
Arte's mother, who got her husband to exile their younger daughter after she considered her powers useless. After Arte saved her hometown from Yelenetta's invasion, Sharon began to regret how she had treated Arte.

== Media ==
=== Light novel ===
Written by Sou Akaike, Easygoing Territory Defense by the Optimistic Lord: Production Magic Turns a Nameless Village into the Strongest Fortified City began serialization on the user-generated novel publishing website Shōsetsuka ni Narō on May 15, 2020. It was later acquired by Overlap who began releasing it with illustrations by Kururi under their Overlap Novels light novel imprint on September 25, 2021. Ten volumes have been released as of June 2026. The series is licensed in North America by Seven Seas Entertainment.

No.	Original release date	Original ISBN	North American release date	North American ISBN
1	September 25, 2021	978-4-86554-980-5	November 23, 2023 (digital); January 9, 2024 (print)	979-8-88843-318-8
2	February 25, 2022	978-4-8240-0111-5	April 4, 2024 (digital); May 14, 2024 (print)	979-8-88843-583-0
3	August 25, 2022	978-4-8240-0272-3	September 19, 2024 (digital); October 22, 2024 (print)	979-8-88843-584-7
4	March 25, 2023	978-4-8240-0416-1	February 6, 2025 (digital); March 11, 2025 (print)	979-8-89160-577-0
5	August 25, 2023	978-4-8240-0585-4	July 17, 2025 (digital); August 19, 2025 (print)	979-8-89373-380-8
6	March 25, 2024	978-4-8240-0765-0	November 13, 2025 (digital); January 6, 2026 (print)	979-8-89373-535-2
7	January 25, 2025	978-4-8240-0953-1	April 23, 2026 (digital); May 26, 2026 (print)	979-8-89561-778-6
8	August 25, 2025	978-4-8240-1261-6	August 27, 2026 (digital); October 20, 2026 (print)	979-8-89765-985-2
9	December 25, 2025	978-4-8240-1455-9	March 2, 2027 (print)	979-8-89863-655-5
10	June 20, 2026	978-4-8240-1694-2	—	—
11	December 20, 2026	978-4-8240-1979-0	—	—

=== Manga ===
A manga adaptation illustrated by Maro Aoiro began serialization on Overlap's Comic Gardo manga service on August 13, 2021. The manga's chapters have been collected into nine tankōbon volumes as of November 2026. The manga adaptation is also licensed in North America by Seven Seas Entertainment.

No.	Original release date	Original ISBN	North American release date	North American ISBN
1	February 25, 2022	978-4-8240-0117-7	January 30, 2024	979-8-88843-319-5
2	August 25, 2022	978-4-8240-0278-5	April 30, 2024	979-8-88843-585-4
3	February 25, 2023	978-4-8240-0425-3	August 27, 2024	979-8-88843-850-3
4	August 25, 2023	978-4-8240-0593-9	February 4, 2025	979-8-89160-552-7
5	March 25, 2024	978-4-8240-0774-2	July 1, 2025	979-8-89373-134-7
6	August 25, 2024	978-4-8240-0934-0	November 25, 2025	979-8-89373-912-1
7	April 25, 2025	978-4-8240-1173-2	May 26, 2026	979-8-89765-205-1
8	February 25, 2026	978-4-8240-1543-3	November 24, 2026	979-8-89863-179-6
9	November 20, 2026	978-4-8240-1945-5; 978-4-8240-1946-2 (SE)	—	—

=== Anime ===
An anime television series adaptation was announced during the "Great Overlap Bunko All-Star Gathering Special 2025" livestream on April 20, 2025. It is produced by NAZ and directed by Tetsuya Tatamitani, with Takayuki Kuriyama serving as series director and supervisor, series composition handled by Yutaka Yasunaga, characters designed by Shingo Nakamura, and music composed by Kana Utatane. The series premiered from January 10 to March 28, 2026, on Tokyo MX and other networks. The opening theme song is "Okirakuze~shon" (おきらくぜ～しょん), performed by Rei Nakashima, while the ending theme song is "Make It", performed by Nonoka Ōbuchi. Crunchyroll is streaming the series. Muse Communication licensed the series in Southeast Asia.

==== Episodes ====
No.	Title	Directed by	Written by	Storyboarded by	Original release date (Note: Episodes are released on Prime Video, Crunchyroll and simulcast platforms by Muse 3 days before their televised airings.)
1	"The Young Genius's Harsh Expulsion From His Home"; Transliteration: "Tensai Shōnen no Kibishī Furusato Sasen" (Japanese: 天才少年の厳しい故郷左遷)	Takayuki Kuruyama	Yutaka Yasunaga	Hiroyuki Shimazu	January 10, 2026
A salaryman is reincarnated to an alternate world as two year old noble Van Ney Fertio. He quickly learns that elemental magical power is highly valued and his father Marquis Jalpa expects Van to gain fire magic, as his brothers already wield elemental magic. Van's sudden increase in intelligence amazes his maid Till, so the butler Esparda becomes his tutor. At four years old, Till teaches him how to use a sword and by five, Van is capable of dueling older trainee knights. Commander Dee is impressed and begins formally training him. By six, Van is recognized as a genius. Van witnesses a man selling his abused son Khamsin into slavery, so with help from Rosalie of the Mary Chamber of Commerce, Van buys Khamsin as a servant. Van reaches eight years old and has his magic appraised. Jalpa is furious that Van only has Production Magic, which can create objects from available materials. Jalpa decides to execute Van to avoid the shame, but Murcia, one of Van's brothers, convinces Jalpa to make Van the lord of a nameless, undeveloped village in the mountains. Esparda retires as Jalpa's butler so he can accompany Van and continue his education. Likewise, Khamsin, Till, Dee, and knights Arb and Law insist on going with Van. Everyone learns of Van's departure even though Jalpa intended to keep it a secret.
2	"The Proper Way to Use Weak Magic"; Transliteration: "Nanjaku Majutsu no Tadashī Shiyō Hōhō" (Japanese: 軟弱魔術の正しい使用方法)	Takayuki Kuruyama	Yutaka Yasunaga	Takayuki Kuruyama	January 17, 2026
As Van learns how to use Production Magic, he finds the village under attack by bandits. The adventurer guards refuse to do anything except protect Van. Van volunteers to charge a carriage at the bandits, and the others reluctantly let him. Amazed that a noble would risk himself for commoners, the adventurer Ortho convinces the others to join the battle with Dee, Arb and Law, Esparda, Van, and Khamsin. Most of the bandits are killed along with their leader while the survivors are captured. As most of the adventurers already have other work scheduled, they depart, but Ortho and his party decide to stay. Van introduces himself to the village chief Ronda and discovers the village inside the wall is mostly empty space with several run down houses and 100 villagers, who are doubtful of him. Convincing them that he is there to help, Van immediately drops taxes from 30% to 10% and has Esparda erect a temporary earth wall to deter bandits so they can set up defenses later. Van begins practicing with Production Magic and discovers a way of knitting wood fibers together into material as strong as nanofiber. No one understands his explanation, but are amazed that his new wood blocks can't be damaged. He also experiments with metal, making a katana for Khamsin and a huge axe for the disappointed Till. Confident in his abilities, Van produces a mansion in seconds, giving the villagers real hope.
3	"The Wonderful Renovation of an Impoverished Frontier"; Transliteration: "Hinkon Hekichi no Subarashī Dai Kaizō" (Japanese: 貧困僻地の素晴らしい大改造)	Nana Fujiwara	Yutaka Yasunaga	Hiroyuki Shimazu	January 24, 2026
After creating his mansion, Van produces improved wooden houses for everybody with plans to modify them to each family's requirements once he can replace the wood with stone, though Ortho gets competitive with Dee over gathering lumber. He also produces a public bath house with the help of Purriel and Khamsin, though Dee embarrasses Van while bathing. The next day, everyone cooperates to construct a canal to divert the river and provide unlimited fresh water. As a precaution against droughts, Van also constructs a giant lake. Nearby, a carriage containing Lady Panamera and the younger Lady Arte approaches the village during the night. The following day, Van turns the temporary earth wall into vast walls of concrete with massive ballistae against bandit attacks. Next, Van decides to figure out how the village can make money without relying on him to produce sellable goods. While having Khamsin and Till test out their weapons, Ortho discovers that the mountains nearby contain iron, gold, silver, and even mithril, which Van uses to create new weapons for Ortho's party. With ores just lying on the ground, Esparda believes that there is an undiscovered dungeon, and if it is on Van's lands, the village would quickly become a dungeon town and very wealthy. It also makes them vulnerable to attack from other nations, or even from Van's father, who might seize the village for himself and force Van to move. The adventurers agree not to search for the dungeon until the village is ready. Armored Lizard monsters approach, and while the villagers panic, Van rallies them to trust in their new walls.
4	"Rushed Hospitality and a Busy Emissary Visit"; Transliteration: "Dotabata Settai to Isogashī Shisha Geihin" (Japanese: ドタバタ接待と忙しい使者迎賓)	Mayu Uehata & Asuka Okubo	Yutaka Yasunaga	Royden B	January 31, 2026
The villagers prepare for battle against the lizard monsters, but Dee warns Van that there are forty of them and are hard to take down. The ballistae weapons are surprisingly effective against the lizards despite their tough armor. Upon running out of metal bolts, Van advises them to use the wooden bolts, which also prove effective. After all the lizards are slain, the villagers harvest them for their meat and materials. They have a feast at night. Ortho, his party, Arb, and Law all offer to buy the weapons that Van made. Van also learns how much the lizard meat and materials will sell, but he fears that selling them will alert his father. Esparda suggests selling them to Murcia so to reduce their chances of attracting unwanted attention. Traveling merchants Bell and Rango arrive at the village and buy the lizard meat and materials from Van, along with the weapons that he made. To avoid drawing attention, Van has them set up a shop in the village. Panamera and Arte arrive at the village and are wary of it as Van continues his plan to convert the town into a fortress town. Upon meeting Panamera and Arte, Van correctly deducts that they're here to judge if he is an ally or enemy. Van also explains where he came from and demonstrates his Production Magic. Panamera reveals that Arte's father sent Arte here to arrange a marriage between her and Van, but they aren't sure about it yet. They also decide to stay in Van's village. Van also deduces that Arte was exiled from her hometown.
5	"A Rare Species' Passionate Engagement Competition"; Transliteration: "Kishō Shuzoku no Atsui Shinkon Shōbu" (Japanese: 希少種族の熱い新婚勝負)	Takahiro Ono	Yutaka Yasunaga	Hiroyuki Shimazu	February 7, 2026
Van is woken up by Till and Khamsin, who bring him to the village's lake where the other villagers are. In the lake is an apkallu, a rare being that is half-fish and half-human. Unable to communicate with her, Van lures her over with meat so they can interact. She returns with more of her kind upon learning that Van defeated the lizard monsters, and her father Lada Vesta, the leader of the apkallus, requests for Van to marry his daughter, whose name is Lada Priora. When Van asks why, Vesta explains that the lizards have been threatening his kind in the past and desires to have his daughter get engaged with a strong human so his people will be kept safe. Van turns down the marriage and instead will provide homes for them in his village while also allowing Priora to marry whoever she chooses. The apkallus also help keep the lake clean. When Panamera and Arte arrive, a misunderstanding occurs when Priora claims that she is Van's wife, as she still wishes to marry him. Later, Van speaks to Arte alone until Priora and some young apkallus interrupt them, causing Van to accidentally upset Lada and Vesta, who decides to hold a competition to see whom Van will marry, with all of Van's allies agreeing to take part in it. Van provides Khamsin, Till, Dee, and Panamera with bathing suits so they can take part in water activities. They start with a water volleyball match, which ends with the apkallus' team winning. The next event is a relay race in the lake, which Dee wins at. The last event involves eating shaved ice in record time, with Arte choosing to take part in this event. Van's team wins, but Priora and Vesta do not call off the engagement despite this loss. Arte then recalls her past. The next day, Arte starts developing feelings for Van. Meanwhile, Ortho and his party are being chased by something.
6	"Slaying a Dangerous Forest Dragon with Large Ballistae"; Transliteration: "Ōgata Ishiyumi-Hō no Abumai Mori Ryū Tōbatsu" (Japanese: 大型弩砲の危ない森竜討伐)	Takayuki Kuruyama	Yutaka Yasunaga	Atushi Ikariya	February 14, 2026
After finishing all the village ramparts, Panamera is left amazed, especially with the ballistae that Van made. Khamsin does a demonstration with one of the ballistae to show how powerful they are. Panamera wants to buy one, but Van says that they aren't for sale; however, she asks to return a favor in exchange for a ballistae instead, which Van agrees. Khamsin also demonstrates the strength of Van's swords by using one to destroy Panamera's, as they are made from the same material as the ballistae, which persuades her to also obtain some of the ballistae bolts. Van sees Ortho and his party still on the run from their pursuer, a large forest dragon. Though Ortho intends to lure it away, Van wants to fight it instead, with Panamera also aiding him. As Till takes Arte to safety, Van prepares the ballistae to fire as Panamera attacks the dragon with her fire magic, allowing Ortho's group to get to safety. Unable to take the dragon down, they escape to the village. Esparda holds back the dragon with his Earth magic to buy them more time, though he is unable to run, prompting Khamsin to accompany him. As Van forms a plan with Panamera, Dee, Arb, and Law go to fight the dragon, but are no match for it. Van's plan weakens the dragon, allowing Dee to kill it by slicing off its head. As Van decides to upgrade the ballistae, he, Dee, and Esparda are given full credit for killing the dragon. Panamera's backstory is revealed during this. She then forms a firm alliance with Van.
7	"Earnest Merchants and Receiving a Proud Title"; Transliteration: "O Majime Shōnin to Hokorashī Shakui Juyo" (Japanese: お真面目商人と誇らしい爵位授与)	Mayu Uehata	Yutaka Yasunaga	Royden B	February 21, 2026
Van begins making plans to expand the village. Merchants from the Mary Chamber of Commerce arrive to buy parts of the slain dragon, and Van learns how much they are worth. The merchants are revealed to be shady; Bell and Rango disagree with their prices, leading the merchants threatening to have them fired in response. Van suggests that they start their own business in his town and has Panamera help them, with Van also suggesting that she should also take credit for slaying the dragon. She shoots this idea down and advices Van to become a baron instead, intimidating him into doing so. Bell and Rango are pleased that their new business is going well, but discover that the shady merchants have taken their carriage. Van and Panamera help build them another carriage that's faster than their old one, and Panamera, Bell, and Rango beat the merchants to the Kingdom of Scuderia, where Panamera asks its ruler Dino to make Van a noble after telling him about Van's recent actions, showing him a dragon's fang as proof. Dino agrees, and Van is able to give further upgrades to his town. He has lunch with his subordinates at the top of one of the newly built towers. They decide to name the village Van Town. Immigrants later arrive at the village, to which Van learns of the village's true name: Seatoh Village. Upon learning how poor they have been living, revealed to be the work of Van's father, Van allows them to move into his village. Van also learns that they have cows and considers putting them to good use. Van provides the new villagers with a meal. To help them make money, Van has them open shops and handle labor in the village.
8	"The Noisy Post-Apocalyptic Dungeon Crawl"; Transliteration: "Chō Seikimatsu no Urusai Meikyū Tansaku" (Japanese: 超世紀末のうるさい迷宮探索)	Takahiro Ono	Yutaka Yasunaga	Hiroyuki Shimazu	February 28, 2026
As Van continues to develop the village, Ortho's group return to tell him that they found the dungeon, which means they will have to report to the capital and put Seatoh Village at risk of being targeted. Van decides to tell the capital anyway to lure in adventurers and sends Kusala to deliver the message, giving him a mithril sword to help. Along the way, Kusala finds a carriage under attack by orcs, which he defeats. He meets its occupant: a girl named Flamiria, who recently lost her father and house, and is heading to the capital to find a new home. Kusala accompanies her and she falls in love with him. As Van makes plans to build another village for the adventurers who are interested in the dungeon, Kusala and Flamiria arrive along with a group of thuggish adventurers. The adventurers belittle Van at first, but when he shows his creation magic and Dee forces them to behave, they become loyal to him. Ortho's group also request Van to build a base near the dungeon since its location is dangerous and it is far away from the village. Van heads there with Till, Khasmin, Aret, Ortho's group, and the adventurers. Along the way, the adventurers kill a giant troll, and Van builds a safe bridge across a large ravine. Once there, Van creates a gate in front of the dungeon entrance to keep monsters inside and builds a large hotel base near it. The inside consists of a rest and storage area, a dining room, bedrooms, a balcony, and rain catchments. Van has Ortho be in charge of the base. Arte also discovers mithril ore before they return to the village, but Van proceeds to get a stein lecture by Esparda for being away for too long despite Ortho attempting to defend him.
9	"The Timid Girl's Graceful Marionette Dance"; Transliteration: "Okubyō Shōjo no Utsukushī Kugutsu Buyō" (Japanese: 臆病少女の美しい傀儡舞踊)	Nana Fujiwara	Yutaka Yasunaga	Katsuya Kikuchi	March 7, 2026
While touring the village with Arte, Van invites her to stay in his village. She accepts and wants to be engaged to Van. Bell and Rango return with platinum coins allow with a special kind of crossbow. Van is unable to replicate it. Van also question Arte about her magic, and she reveals that she has Marionette magic, which is very rare. He has her test it out by controlling a doll like a puppet. An amazed Till wants to show off this talent, but Arte is skeptical as her magic is considered illegal. Van convinces her to do so, and they set up a puppet show for the villagers to see. After showing off this magic via controlling a human-sized puppet that Van created for her, everyone enjoys it. The next day, Panamera returns and is amazed to see that Arte has changed. Dino is also here along with his chancellor Aperta. They enter a partnership and Van also tells Dino about the dungeon and the dragon that he slayed. Van gives Dino a tour around the town and demonstrates their defenses, also introducing the adventurers and apkulla. Another rampart is then built on the other side of the lake. Vesta forms an alliance with Dino and gives him orichalcum, which Van uses to make a sword. Dino witnesses this and Van gives him certain demands to protect his land in exchange for Dino requesting usage of Van's skills, all while ensuring that Van won't have to move to the capital. Afterwards, a wyvern suddenly attacks the village.
10	"A Secret Weapon's Villainous Attack on the Homeland"; Transliteration: "Himitsu Heiki no Waru Doi Bokoku Shūgeki" (Japanese: 秘密兵器の悪どい母国襲撃)	Mika Takahata	Yutaka Yasunaga	Royden B	March 14, 2026
The wyvern has a mage, who is its master, riding on its back. Dino suspects this to be an attack from a rival kingdom called Yelenetta, who has been at war with Scuderia for years. Meanwhile, a group of knights from Yelenetta are approaching Seatoh to conquer it, led by a prince named Uinmog; the mage is working with them. Uinmog is amazed by Seatoh's construction. Thinking that it is a façade, he orders his men to attack the city, but they can't break through its walls. Van greets Uinmog, who is shocked that he knew who they are. Uinmog orders the mage on the wyvern to attack Van, but Van responds by making Panamera fire a rampant that creates a rain of shurikens that knock the wyvern out of the sky. Upon noticing Dino, the knights surrender, but Uinmog refuses to until Panamera makes him give in. Dino decides to reconsider the laws of magic. While interrogating Uinmog, Panamera learns of Yelenetta's plan to invade nearby kingdoms starting with Seatoh. Their next target is the Fortress City of Scudet, so Dino asks Van to help them defend the city. Van accepts without hesitation. Dee and his men, Khamsin, Till, Arte, the thuggish adventurers, and Ortho's group all agree to go with Van while Panamera plans to join Van later. Meanwhile, Marquis Jalpa learns about the attack on Scudet and prepares for a counterattack, but refuses to believe how much Van's legacy is grown. Jalpa reaches Scudet, only to find it already conquered by Yelenetta's forces. Jalpa's men are quickly defeated, but Yelenetta's wyverns leave without attacking Jalpa. Arte attacks the enemy soldiers and wyverns with her puppet. The enemy soldiers discover Van's group, but they quickly overpower the soldiers. Van and his friends decide to fall back for now when more enemy soldiers arrive. Jalpa, having also been forced to retreat, prepares for another counterattack to retake Scudet. Marcia arrives with Dino, and Jalpa informs him of what happened, leading Dino to suspect that his survival was Van's doing. Jalpa is shocked to see what Van has become while Marcia is proud of him. Later, Van creates a catapult as a new weapon, but will make more during the battle. He begins tomorrow's plan of attack.
11	"The Ultimate Squad's Proud Counterattack"; Transliteration: "Saikyō Butai no Kedakai Keisei Gyakuten" (Japanese: 最強部隊の気高い形勢逆転)	Takayuki Kuruyama	Yutaka Yasunaga	Hiroyuki Shimazu	March 21, 2026
Van's group travel to the city near Scudet, where most of the kingdom's army has retreated to. Van meets his father again for the first time. Jalpa demands to know how Van managed to rise to power as Panamera meets up with them, asking to buy more of Van's weapons. They all go to meet up with Dino and other nobles; among them is Arte's father, Count Ferdinand. They talk about Yelenetta's powerful army and new weapons. When Van gives Dino an idea, Dino asks him to take the front line, but Van instead wants to be on the support capacity. Jalpa continues to belittle Van. After learning of Yelenetta's earlier attempt to conquer Seatoh, Van explains his plans to use ballistae to counter the attack and shows off his powers by creating a catapult and ballistae, but Jalpa is still doubtful that they would be of any help and leaves. Arte meets her father again and he reveals how her mother is doing. Van has Till stay with Arte before meeting up with the rest of his allies to figure out how to deal with the wyverns. The gang lead another attack to reclaim Scudet, using shields that Van made to block their attacks. Panamera leads a team to break down the gate, allowing the army to get inside the city, fighting and defeating many enemy soldiers. The commander of the enemy soldiers summons the wyverns to attack, but Khamsin counters them with catapults. However, there is also a large wyvern, whom they eventually manage to defeat. The Yelenetta commander is forced to surrender. Jalpa leaves without talking to Van, though he begins to see that he was wrong about him. Meanwhile, Van and his allies interrogate the commander, learning that Scudet and Seatoh were only two of the three cities that Yelenetta planned to conquer. The third one is Ferdinand County, Arte's hometown.
12	"Easygoing Territory Defense by the Optimistic Lord"; Transliteration: "O Kiraku Ryōshu to Tanoshī Ryōchi Bōei" (Japanese: お気楽領主と楽しい領地防衛)	Takayuki Kuruyama	Yutaka Yasunaga	Hiroyuki Shimazu	March 28, 2026
Arte chooses to go to her hometown on her own, as Van helping her may cause a downfall for her father's reputation. Van accepts, but also sends Orthos, his party, and the adventurers to escort her. The group arrive at Ferdinand County to find it under attack, to Arte's horror. She decides that only someone from her family must deal with the threat. Meanwhile, Arte's mother Sharon and her older sister are watching from the castle, fearing for the worse as Yelenetta has almost conquered the town. Arte sends her puppet into battle, but this gets the enemy soldiers' attention and they target Arte's group. Arte decides to ask Ortho and his group for help as she heads for the front line. Despite losing an arm, Arte's puppet can still move. Although they managed to defeat all the enemy soldiers, they still have to deal with the wyverns. Arte summons a second puppet to help, eventually defeating all the wyverns. This forces Yelenetta's forces to retreat. Count Ferdinand informs his wife and elder daughter that it was Arte who saved them, causing Sharon to regret how she had treated her. Arte chooses to not go home as it would cause further harm to her family, instead deciding to go back to Seatoh. Arte still lacks confidence in herself, but Van cheers her up. Van has also further improved the town, remembering what it was like before his arrival. However, Van now finds himself in an argument between Esparda and Dee, and runs to get out of it.

== Reception ==
By March 2024, the series has over 1 million copies in circulation. The series was also ranked third in the tankōbon category in the 2022 Next Light Novel Awards.

== See also ==
- Isekai Izakaya "Nobu", another light novel series with the same illustrator
- Magic Maker, another light novel series with the same illustrator
