= Dark Machine =

Japanese mixed media project

- Genre: Mecha; Science fiction; Sports (eSports)
- Created by: Project Caruncole; Keiichi Yano
- Manga

Dark Machine: The Animation
- Illustrated by: Kei Kondо̄
- Published by: Jitsugyo no Nihon Sha
- Magazine: Comic Ruelle; Comic Jardin
- Original run: September 25, 2026 – present
- Anime television series

Dark Machine: The Animation
- Directed by: Kazumi Terada
- Written by: Team Carbuncle (Takaaki Suzuki, Tatsuhiko Urata, Atsuo Ishino, Satohito Sata)
- Music by: Sugizo
- Studio: Production +h.
- Licensed by: Crunchyroll: SEA: Medialink
- Original network: Fuji TV, Kansai TV, BS Fuji
- Original run: October 14, 2026 – present
- Episodes: 1
- Video game

Dark Machine: The Game
- Developer: Liona Interactive
- Publisher: Liona Interactive
- Produced by: Gorō Taniguchi
- Designed by: Hidetaka Tenjin
- Platform: PC, iOS, Android
- icon

Dark Machine is a Japanese mixed-media project produced by Project Carbuncle. It includes a video game that uses Web3 elements, including integrated cryptocurrency and an NFT marketplace. An anime television series titled Dark Machine: The Animation and produced by Production +h. premiered in October 2026.

== Premise ==
Dark Machine takes place in a futuristic world where the world is at conflict over energy resources. This follows the discovery of Palmer crystals, which provide a high amount of energy to power the world, but has also gained the attention of competing factions. As part of this conflict, factions have developed highly advanced mechs, initially for harvesting Palmer crystals, but have since been modified for use in underground battles.

Dark Machine: The Animation is set in Golden Valley, a special economic zone in Japan that uses the popular esports game Dark Machine to boost the local economy. A young man named Kairi arrives in Golden Valley following the death of his grandfather. Following an encounter with a young girl named Rudora, and getting involved with a conflict with Ajima, who is a powerful Dark Machine player, Kairi finds himself thrust into the world of Dark Machine.

== Characters ==
Kairi (カイリ)
Voiced by: Kensho Ono
Rudora (ルドラ)
Voiced by: Miyuki Sawashiro
Shinn (シン, Shin)
Voiced by: Koki Uchiyama
Bran (ブラン, Buran)
Voiced by: Riho Sugiyama
Isana (イサナ)
Voiced by: Saya Aizawa
Ajima (アジマ)
Voiced by: Yuichi Nakamura
Myōjin (ミョウジン)
Voiced by: Kazuyuki Okitsu
Ryō (リョウ)
Voiced by: Ryōta Suzuki
Kinji (キンジ)
Voiced by: Genta Nakamura
Hiru (ヒル)
Voiced by: Sōhei Horikane
Nyūdō (ニュウドウ)
Voiced by: Ryūnosuke Watanuki
Hachiman (ハチマン)
Voiced by: Jun Kousaka
Bianca (ビアンカ, Bianka)
Voiced by: Minori Suzuki
Weiss (ヴァイス, Vuaisu)
Voiced by: Rikuya Yasuda
Ark (アルク, Aruku)
Voiced by: Nao Tōyama
Denebora (デネボラ)
Voiced by: Nonoka Ōbuchi
Spica (スピカ, Supika)
Voiced by: Rei Nakashima

== Other media ==
=== Manga ===
A manga adaptation of the anime series illustrated by Kei Kondо̄ began serialization on Jitsugyo no Nihon Sha's Comic Ruelle and Comic Jardin websites on September 25, 2026.

=== Anime ===
The anime promotional video was first presented at San Diego Comic-Con in July 2024, with an upload of additional scenes being shown at the Tokyo Game Show later that year from October. An anime television series titled Dark Machine: The Animation and produced by Production +h. was announced on November 23, 2025. The series is directed by Kazumi Terada, features Taniguchi as a creative producer, Tenjin as the mech designer, and character designs by Kō Yoshinari and Akira Mitani. Takaaki Suzuki, Tatsuhiko Urata, Atsuo Ishino, and Satohito Sata are credited as scriptwriters under the name Team Carbuncle, and the music was composed by Sugizo. It premiered on October 14, 2026, on Fuji TV and other networks. The opening theme song is "Sonzai Riyū Kai" (存在理由 改; Reason to Live, Renewed), performed by Buck-Tick, and the ending theme song is "Galaxy Mode", performed by Sandaime J Soul Brothers. Crunchyroll is streaming the series. Medialink licensed the series in Southeast Asia for streaming on Ani-One Asia's YouTube channel.

=== Video game ===
The Dark Machine game was announced on February 9, 2024, with a release planned for PC, iOS, and Android. The game is created by Keiichi Yano, is produced by anime director Gorō Taniguchi, and features art by Hidetaka Tenjin. The game is integrated with blockchain and Web3 elements, such as the cryptocurrency $MXNA and a marketplace that allows users to purchase and trade non-fungible tokens, though these are not required to play the game.
