= I'm a Behemoth =

Japanese light novel series

- I'm a Behemoth, an S-Ranked Monster, but Mistaken for a Cat, I Live as an Elf Girl's Pet
- First light novel volume cover

Ｓランクモンスターの《ベヒーモス》だけど、猫と間違われてエルフ娘の騎士ペットとして暮らしてます (Esuranku Monsutā no "Behīmosu" dakedo, Neko to Machigawarete Erufu Musume no Kishi Petto to Shite Kurashitemasu)
- Genre: Adventure; Fantasy comedy; Sword and sorcery
- Novel series
- Written by: Nozomi Ginyoku
- Published by: Shōsetsuka ni Narō
- Original run: August 19, 2017 – present
- Light novel
- Written by: Nozomi Ginyoku
- Illustrated by: Mitsuki Yano
- Published by: Micro Magazine
- English publisher: NA: Yen Press
- Imprint: GC Novels
- Original run: March 30, 2018 – present
- Volumes: 2
- Manga
- Written by: Nozomi Ginyoku
- Illustrated by: Taro Shinonome
- Published by: Hakusensha
- English publisher: NA: Yen Press
- Imprint: Young Animal Comics
- Magazine: Young Animal Arashi; (March 2 – June 1, 2018); Young Animal; (July 13, 2018 – present)
- Original run: March 2, 2018 – present
- Volumes: 14
- Anime television series

Beheneko: The Elf-Girl's Cat Is Secretly an S-Ranked Monster!
- Directed by: Tetsuo Hirakawa
- Written by: Kanichi Katō
- Music by: Yūsuke Shirato; Oni
- Studio: Zero-G; Saber Works
- Licensed by: Sentai Filmworks: SA/SEA: Muse Communication
- Original network: Tokyo MX, SUN, BS11, TVh, UX, NCC, HAB (censored); AT-X (uncensored)
- Original run: January 4, 2025 – March 22, 2025
- Episodes: 12
- icon

I'm a Behemoth, an S-Ranked Monster, but Mistaken for a Cat, I Live as an Elf Girl's Pet, (Note: Japanese: Ｓランクモンスターの《ベヒーモス》だけど、猫と間違われてエルフ娘の騎士ペットとして暮らしてます, Hepburn: Esuranku Monsutā no "Behīmosu" dakedo, Neko to Machigawarete Erufu Musume no Kishi Petto to Shite Kurashitemasu) also known simply as Beheneko, is a Japanese light novel series written by Nozomi Ginyoku and illustrated by Mitsuki Yano. It began serialization on the user-generated novel publishing website Shōsetsuka ni Narō in August 2017. It was later acquired by Micro Magazine, which began publishing it under its GC Novels imprint in March 2018. A manga adaptation illustrated by Taro Shinonome began serialization in Hakusensha's Young Animal Arashi magazine in March 2018 before being transferred to the Young Animal magazine in July of the same year. Beheneko follows a story of a once proud knight, slain in battle, finds himself alive once more-reincarnated in the body of a small kitten owned by a young, female elf.

An anime television series adaptation produced by Zero-G and Saber Works aired from January to March 2025.

== Plot ==
An unnamed knight is killed and is reincarnated as a baby behemoth, one of the most powerful monsters, which happens to resemble an ordinary cat. A beautiful elf girl named Aria adopts him as a pet and names him Tama. He quickly falls in love with her, and when he demonstrates his incredible powers to protect her, everyone assumes that he is an elemental cat. Aria had bad experiences with men but grows to love Tama, and several other women fall in love with him too.

== Characters ==
Tama (タマ)
Voiced by: Tasuku Hatanaka, Riho Sugiyama (cat) (Japanese); Ben McLaughin (English)
A knight who was killed by demons and reincarnated as a young behemoth, one of the strongest monsters in the world, but he resembles a cat. He can evolve, eat monster remains to gain their abilities, and store things in a pocket dimension. He is Aria's pet, who found him in the dungeon and nursed him back to health. She also named him; however, Aria doesn't know of his true nature. Whenever they are traveling, he usually resides in Aria's breasts. Before long, he gains lots of love interests; Aria included, but they are very competitive for him. Many think he's an elemental cat or a holy beast, but a few individuals know what he really is. Upon evolving, he can take his monstrous form until he runs out of energy.
Aria (アリア)
Voiced by: Hinaki Yano (Japanese); Kira Vincent-Davis (English)
An elf girl adventurer who wishes to be a warrior like her idol Alisha. She is the master of Tama after finding him in the dungeon and giving him his name, though she has no idea that he is a behemoth; however, she soon becomes smitten with him and gets jealous when anyone else falls in love with him. She possesses an ability that allows her to move very fast and fights with daggers, but soon gains the ability to turn them into holy blades and later a powerful skill called Excalibur, which can kill even strong demons.
Vulcan (ヴァルカン, Varukan)
Voiced by: Tomori Kusunoki (Japanese); Brittney Karbowski (English)
A female Tigris-ears blacksmith, who wields a large hammer and fire magic. She joins Aria and Tama on their adventure and also becomes attracted to Tama. She has connections to Geisel and his allies.
Stella (ステラ, Sutera)
Voiced by: Hitomi Ueda (Japanese); Celeste McCarthy (English)
An earth dragon whom Tama kills so her eye can be used as an antidote for Aria, who was poisoned by a demon. She is reincarnated as a girl with sharp teeth and claws called a dragonnewt. Aria names her and, believing that she lost her memories, has her join her team. She can deploy dragon claws and a tail, telepathically communicate with Tama, and fight with a large sword and shield thanks to her super strength. She also develops feelings for Tama despite being defeated by him, making Aria jealous. She knows that Tama is a behemoth, but agrees to keep it a secret.
Lily (リリ, Riri)
Voiced by: Nonoka Ōbuchi (Japanese); Jade Kelly (English)
A fairy who joins Aria's party and grows attached to Tama. She and Feri get along well with Belzebuth.
Feri (フェリ)
Voiced by: Yū Wakui (Japanese); Katelyn Barr (English)
A dryad who joins Aria's party and grows attached to Tama. She and Lily get along well with Belzebuth.
Kasman
A very perverted adventurer who tries to execute Tama and force Aria to marry him by beating them in a duel, but he loses to Tama. As a result, he is forced to leave them alone.
Arnold Holzweilzenegger
A guild receptionist. Though he is a guy, he has the face of a woman and wears a revealing female outfit. He and Cedric are in a relationship. He can use ice magic.
Alisha
The Sword Saint, who once protected Aria's village in the past. This inspired Aria to follow her footsteps. Like Stella, she also knows that Tama is a behemoth, but agrees to keep it a secret. She is one of the Grand Mage's wives.
Lala
An orphan girl whom Tama and Aria save from thugs. Aria takes her to the church where she can stay with other orphans under the care of a nun who works there.
Cedric Ruine
The leader of a party of powerful heroes. He is in a relationship with Arnold.
Danny, Howard, Keni, and Mariette
Members of Cedric's group, who are all heroes who emerged victorious in the battle against demons. Keni and Mariette also develop affection for Tama.
Beryl Astaroth
The leader of a group of demons, who wields powerful magic and wants revenge on humanity for defeating the demons. He is killed by Aria.
Reiss Greybone
A man who seeks revenge for the death of his wife, but his persuaded by his wife's animated skeleton to give up revenge, and he surrenders.
Eliza Greybone
Reiss's wife, who was murdered by an evil earl. Her reanimated skeleton later convinces her husband to not take revenge.
Earl of Gladstone
A corrupted man who murdered Eliza and several other women along with his butler. After his crimes are exposed, he and his butler are arrested.
Geisel Auschra
The ruler of the imperial capital and Julius's father. Vulcan had a partnership with him and Julius in the past.
Julius
The prince of the imperial capital and Geisel's son. He is a powerful fighter and previously worked with Vulcan.
Belzebuth
A demon who is an ally to Geisel. She can read minds. She serves as a mentor to Feri and Lily and gets along with them well. She is one of the Grand Mage's wives.
Grand Mage
An unseen character who is a reincarnated person from Japan. He is Belzebuth and Alisha's husband.
Elvan
The chief of Lumines, Aria's home village.
Fionne
Aria's childhood friend, who fights with archery.
Leona
Aria's mother, who can wield shockwave magic.
Leo
An elemental cat who works with Alisha and Fionne. He gets along well with Tama, Feri, and Lily.
Gusione
The Amazon leader of a squad in Lumines. She is actually a demon working for Vasaago, but Alisha sees through her disguise and kills her.
Vasaago
One of Mammon's four demons, who is the strongest of the group, but shows very little regard for his subordinates. He is killed by Aria.
Nidhogg
Vasaago's pet dragon. He is killed by Aria.
Revi
One of Mammon's four demons, who can transform into a dragon. She is killed by Alisha.
Mammon
The leader of a group of four demons, who plan to free him so he can revive the God of Darkness.
God of Darkness
An unknown powerful being who can cause world destruction. Mammon seeks to revive him once he is freed.

== Media ==
=== Light novel ===
Written by Nozomi Ginyoku, I'm a Behemoth, an S-Ranked Monster, but Mistaken for a Cat, I Live as an Elf Girl's Pet began serialization on the user-generated novel publishing website Shōsetsuka ni Narō on August 19, 2017. It was later acquired by Micro Magazine who began publishing it with illustrations by Mitsuki Yano under their GC Novels imprint on March 30, 2018. Two volumes have been released as of October 2018. During their Anime Expo 2019 panel, Yen Press announced that they licensed the light novel.

No.	Original release date	Original ISBN	North American release date	North American ISBN
1	March 30, 2018	978-4-89637-700-2	July 21, 2020	978-1-9753-3294-5
2	October 30, 2018	978-4-89637-829-0	November 17, 2020	978-1-9753-0840-7

=== Manga ===
A manga adaptation illustrated by Taro Shinonome began serialization in Hakusensha's Young Animal Arashi magazine on March 2, 2018. The manga was later transferred to the Young Animal magazine on July 13 that same year. The manga's chapters have been collected into fourteen tankōbon volumes as of March 2026. During their Anime Expo 2019 panel, Yen Press announced that they also licensed the manga adaptation.

No.	Original release date	Original ISBN	North American release date	North American ISBN
1	October 29, 2018	978-4-592-16271-1	April 21, 2020	978-1-9753-9923-8
0. "Reincarnation"; 1. "A Knight's Vow"; 2. "The Elf Girl's Secret"; 3. "The Elf Girl Has Yet Another Secret"; 4. "Vulcan's Item Shop"; 5. "Impending Danger"; 6. "The Duel"; Bonus
2	March 29, 2019	978-4-592-16272-8	July 21, 2020	978-1-9753-9952-8
7. "A New Party"; 8. "A Knight in His Element"; 9. "A Pure and Noble Girl"; 10. "Knight Squadron Captain Cedric"; 11. "The Sheer Power of the Knight Squadron"; 12. "Beginning a Quest"; Bonus
3	October 29, 2019	978-4-592-16273-5	November 9, 2021	978-1-9753-2131-4
13. "The Enemy's True Identity"; 14. "Fierce Battle Against the Demon"; 15. "Return to the Fearsome One"; 16. "From Now On as a Cat"; 17. "In the Elven Homeland, Lumilus"; 18. "The Final Moments of the Strong and What Came Next"; Bonus: "What Tama and Aria Did After the Duel"; Bonus
4	March 27, 2020	978-4-592-16274-2	March 22, 2022	978-1-9753-2333-2
19. "A Kitty and Elf's Picnic"; 20. "A Storm of Jealousy"; 21. "Stella's First Bath and Meal"; 22. "Reincarnations"; 23. "Choosing New Equipment for Stella"; 24. "Stella's Weakness"; Bonus
5	November 27, 2020	978-4-592-16275-9	October 25, 2022	978-1-9753-3455-0
25. "A Girl on the Run"; 26. "A Special Mission"; 27. "An Incident on the Highway"; 28. "An Unsullied Labyrinth"; 29. "Fairies of the Forest"; 30. "Teardrops of Truth"; Bonus
6	May 28, 2021	978-4-592-16336-7	April 18, 2023	978-1-9753-4950-9
31. "A Merchant's Metamorphosis"; 32. "A New Skill"; 33. "The Earl of Gladstone"; 34. "Revenge"; 35. "The Undead Dragon"; 36. "Moment of Truth"; Bonus
7	February 28, 2022	978-4-592-16337-4	August 22, 2023	978-1-9753-6231-7
37. "The Heroes Return"; 38. "Looking for a Home"; 39. "New Powers and Deviation"; 40. "The World Tree and Life Spring"; 41. "A Kitty Between Titties, Plus a Beatdown"; 42. "All Together"; Bonus
8	October 28, 2022	978-4-592-16338-1	January 23, 2024	978-1-9753-7367-2
43. "A Break and a Sudden Troll Battle"; 44. "Hero Prince and the Sudden Demon Lord"; 45. "Determination and the Sword Saint"; 46. "The Will to Confront Terror"; 47. "The Sword Saint, Smiling"; 48. "Time for Revival"; Special Chapter: "Meowing Together in the Bath"; Bonus
9	April 28, 2023	978-4-592-16339-8	May 21, 2024	978-1-9753-8851-5
49. "Vasago of the Four Fiends"; 50. "Tama's Determination and the Sword Saint's True Power"; 51. "Third Form and Awakened Power"; 52. "Leveling Up a Cat Knight"; 53. "On the Road to Lumilus"; 54. "The Female Knight and Her Elemental Cat"; Bonus
10	October 27, 2023	978-4-592-16340-4	October 15, 2024	978-1-9753-9694-7
55. "Reuniting with Mother"; 56. "Battle Training Together"; 57. "A Fierce Battle 1"; 58. "A Fierce Battle 2"; 59. "When Sacred and Demonic Energies Collide"; 60. "The Young Girl Sets Off!"; Bonus
11	March 29, 2024	978-4-592-16428-9	February 18, 2025	979-8-8554-1021-1
61. "A Visitor from the Future"; 62. "Otherworldly Monsters"; 63. "A Glimpse of the Power of the Grand Sorcerer's Beloved Daughter"; 64. "An Icy Female Hero"; 65. "A Dragon Girl and a Cat Knight Cooperate"; 66. "Belphegor of the Seven Great Demon Lords"; Bonus
12	December 26, 2024	978-4-592-16429-6	February 24, 2026	979-8-8554-2331-0
67. "Versus an Ancient Golem"; 68. "Belphegor's Second Form"; 69. "Anticipating a New Battle"; 70. "To the Other World"; 71. "The Village of Ibrah"; 72. "The Ark Labyrinth"; Bonus
13	July 29, 2025	978-4-592-16430-2	January 26, 2027	979-8-8554-3544-3
14	March 27, 2026	978-4-592-16499-9	—	—
15	November 27, 2026	978-4-592-16732-7	—	—

=== Anime ===
An anime television series adaptation was announced on March 18, 2024. It is produced by Zero-G and Saber Works, and directed by Tetsuo Hirakawa, with Kanichi Katō in charge of series scripts, Tomoyuki Abe designing the characters, and Yūsuke Shirato and Oni composing the music. The series aired from January 4 to March 22, 2025, on Tokyo MX and other networks. The opening theme song is "Saijōkyū no Kokoro" (最上級の心; Supreme Heart) by Nonoka Ōbuchi, while the ending theme song is "Rimi" (リミー) by Poka Poka Ion, a special music unit of voice actresses Nao Tōyama and Kiyono Yasuno. Sentai Filmworks licensed the series under the title Beheneko: The Elf-Girl's Cat is Secretly an S-Ranked Monster! in North America for streaming on Hidive. Muse Communication licensed the series in Asia-Pacific.

==== Episodes ====
No.	Title	Directed by	Written by	Storyboarded by	Original release date (Note: Episodes are released on ABEMA, HIDIVE and simulcast platforms by Muse a week before their televised airings.)
1	"The Elf Girl and the Knight's Vow"; Transliteration: "Erufu Musume to Kishi no Chikai" (Japanese: エルフ娘と騎士の誓い)	Takashi Asami	Tetsuo Hirakawa	Tetsuo Hirakawa	January 4, 2025
A knight is killed by a demon and is reincarnated in a dungeon as a baby behemoth, which looks like a cat. Behemoths are one of the world's most powerful monsters. He kills and eats a slime, wyvern, minotaur, golem, and poison serpent and gains their abilities, and learns how to store items in a pocket dimension. A young elf girl named Aria enters the dungeon. The behemoth finds a treasure chest, but touching the gem inside it teleports him to a hostile earth dragon. He escapes with heavy injuries, then Aria finds him, takes him home, and nurses him back to health. When he is healed, he discreetly follows her to the dungeon, vowing to protect her. She kills goblins, then he saves her from a goblin mage. They return to her guild where a man named Kasman sexually harasses her, prompting the behemoth to attack him. Kasman draws his sword, but the guild receptionist, Arnold Holzweilzenegger, makes him leave. Aria names the behemoth Tama and says that he is her pet. They bathe and she confides that as a child, demons attacked her village until they were saved by Alisha the Sword Saint, which made her aspire to be just like Alisha. Later, Kasman gets a paper from a baron to have Tama euthanized, then challenges Aria to a duel. If she wins, Tama will live, but if he wins, she must marry him. He allows her to have a partner, but only Tama volunteers. With Arnold as the judge, the duel begins and Kasman swiftly overpowers Aria, but Tama uses his powers and beats Kasman, ending with his own sword falling on his groin. He fears that he will be killed now that he revealed his abilities, which would make everything discover that he is a behemoth. To his surprise, everyone instead mistakes Tama for an elemental cat as Aria is declared the winner and is allowed to keep him.
2	"The Tiger-Eared Blacksmith and a New Skill"; Transliteration: "Tora-mimi Kaji-shi to Aratanaru Skiru" (Japanese: 虎耳鍛冶士と新たなるスキル)	Keita Nakano	Toshiaki Satō	Takashi Asami	January 11, 2025
Tama learns that Aria's ears are an erogenous zone. Aria goes to the tiger-eared blacksmith Vulcan to get armor for Tama made. Vulcan decides to go with them to the dungeon to learn why Aria's swords keep breaking. Vulcan easily kills goblins with her massive hammer and power over fire. Aria's swords break against tentacled roper monsters. Vulcan deduces that her high-speed fighting style is unsuited for swords and passes her daggers with which she kills the ropers. Tama discreetly eats one to gain its powers. While they bathe in a spring found in the dungeon, Vulcan reveals that her former party broke up due to pregnancy and warns Aria that elemental cats can interbreed with other species and tend to rape others when they go into heat, but Aria gets excited and looks forward to that, freaking the others out. While fighting a minotaur, Tama saves Vulcan from falling debris, making her become attracted to him. They decide to be a team and spend the night with each other. Tama learns that he has the potential to evolve to his next stage, but he refuses because he wants to stay as Aria's cat. Aria and Tama save an orphan girl named Lala from bullies and take her to the church where other orphans are staying. Arnold promotes Aria from Rank D to Rank C, then tells the team that demons are attacking the nearby town of Lenard and abducting people. Aria is determined to stop them.
3	"Urgent Quest - Defeat the Demons!"; Transliteration: "Kinkyū Kuesuto Mazoku Tōbatsu e!" (Japanese: 緊急クエスト 魔族討伐へ！)	Keita Nakano & Kentaro Mizuno	Tetsuo Hirakawa	Shin'ichi Watanabe	January 18, 2025
Aria, Vulcan, and Tama join a party led by Cedric Ruine and composed of Danny, Howard, Keni, and Mariette, all heroes who won a previous war against the demons. Vulcan knows him, and Cedric and Arnold are also revealed to be in a relationship. After defeating some trolls, the party goes to Lenard and bathes in a hot spring. Danny and Howard attempt to peep on the girls, but Tama stops them. The party goes to the demons' lair. The demons' leader, Beryl Astaroth, sends werewolves at them, but they are defeated. He reveals himself and explains he seeks revenge on humanity for the demons' previous defeat. Beryl uses force fields to separate the party and sends trolls with regeneration after them, intending to isolate Tama so he can be killed easily. Tama and Cedric defeat them with fire blasts and a life-draining sword respectively. Aria kills Beryl, but he slashes her with a poisoned dagger and gives a chilling warning before he dies. The party rushes her to the town where a doctor explains the antidote requires an earth dragon eye. Tama rushes to the dungeon and fights the earth dragon from before. Realizing he cannot defeat it as he is now, he evolves to his next stage and becomes an enormous behemoth.
4	"Awaken - Behemoth!"; Transliteration: "Kakusei! "Behīmosu"" (Japanese: 覚醒！《ベヒーモス》)	Lee Dong-ik	Tetsuo Hirakawa	Shin Matsuo	January 25, 2025
Tama mortally wounds the earth dragon after tricking it into letting its guard down, but runs out of energy and returns to cat form. He carries the dragon back to Lenard where the team extracts an eye and feeds it to Aria. As she recovers, she remembers being saved from demons by Alisha and her elemental cat. They return home and Tama goes to the dungeon alone, where he discovers that he now has the earth dragon's powers and is then attacked by a woman with fangs and claws, but he escapes. While going on a picnic, Aria confides that she is tired of always being saved. She gets new revealing armor from Vulcan and the three of them return to the dungeon. They meet the woman from before who has no name and wants to have sex with Tama, only to learn that Tama is still too young to reproduce. Thinking that she lost her memories, Aria takes pity on her and takes her in, naming her Stella. Aria and Vulcan need to teach her basic things like bathing. As Aria sleeps, Stella telepathically speaks to Tama and explains that she was the earth dragon he killed, who reincarnated in a humanoid form and is now in love with him. Aria wakes up and says that Tama is hers, but Stella refuses to give up.
5	"Elf Girl & Dragon Girl"; Transliteration: "Erufu Musume to Doragon Musume" (Japanese: エルフ娘とドラゴン娘)	Takashi Asami	Kan'ichi Katō	ROMANoV HiGA	February 1, 2025
As they eat breakfast, Stella thinks that Aria is strong since she is Tama's master. Tama makes Stella promise not to tell anyone he is a behemoth. Vulcan makes Stella some armor, which is also revealing, and she chooses a massive sword and shield as her weapons. She demonstrates that she can turn her hands into dragon claws and grow a dragon tail at will. They explore the dungeon, but Stella keeps recklessly charging ahead and defeating monsters with ease. She is almost defeated by a roper until Tama saves her, making her calm down and agree to work with the others while fighting as a human and not as a dragon. As they bathe in a dungeon spring, Aria and Stella argue about who deserves Tama and get angry when Vulcan suggests they all share him. They return to the guild so that Arnold can register Stella as an adventurer. A man named Reiss asks for help protecting a shipment. Vulcan cannot come because she has a blacksmithing job. Stella is shocked to learn that the shipment is the skeleton of her previous earth dragon body, which Reiss previously won in an auction.
6	"Girls of the Wandering Woods"; Transliteration: "Mayoi no Mori no Shōjo-tachi" (Japanese: 迷いの森の少女たち)	Shigeki Awai	Toshiaki Satō	Shin Matsuo	February 8, 2025
Before they leave, Arnold promotes Aria to Rank B. Reiss, Aria, Stella, and Tama transport the skeleton by wagon to his hometown of Gladstone. After fending off monsters, they make camp and Reiss gifts Aria some lily of the valley, his fiancee Eliza's favorite flower. He says the skeleton is for raw materials because a war is coming soon. A forest-like labyrinth emerges in their path, but they escape and reach Gladstone. Reiss thanks them and lets them explore the labyrinth. Voices lure them to some hostile apes, but after defeating them, the voices surrender and reveal themselves as the dryad Feri and the tiny fairy Lily. The two give them a potion and have them retrieve a key to a boss room. The group takes them in and they go to Gladstone, but must teach them concepts like paying for food. Reiss examines the potion and says it is Drop of Truth, a powerful truth serum. When he sees Feri and Lily, he is shocked and excuses himself. The group bathes and Tama nearly goes crazy when the others grope Aria. Vulcan finishes her job and rushes to Gladstone on foot. She is attacked by a skeleton that she defeats, but hears a bell and sees some lily of the valley. The group returns to the boss room and defeats a torrent drake. They find a scroll that instantly gives Aria the ability to turn her daggers into holy blades. Feri and Lily, who were waiting outside, are suddenly kidnapped. Reiss rings a bell and tells a portrait of Eliza that he'll be able to bring her back soon.
7	"Undead on Approach Dark Tales of the Earl"; Transliteration: "Semari Kuru Andeddo Hakushaku-ryō no Kuroi Uwasa" (Japanese: 迫りくるアンデッド 伯爵領の黒いうわさ)	Keita Nakano	Tetsuo Hirakawa	Takayuki Inagaki	February 15, 2025
Aria, Stella, and Tama cannot find Feri and Lily, then Vulcan arrives and they fill her in. A butler says that the Earl of Gladstone requests their presence. As they travel to him, Vulcan says she heard rumors of girls disappearing around Gladstone. The Earl, a fat and ugly man, asks the three girls to be his mistresses and tries to serve them drugged tea, but Tama neutralizes it. They interrogate him, but he doesn't know about Feri and Lily and thinks they are actually demons in disguise. The town gets attacked by skeletons. The Earl flees and abandons the girls. Vulcan guards the people while Aria, Stella, and Tama find Reiss summoned them with his bell and kidnapped Feri and Lily, putting them in a trance to drain their mana. He wants revenge against the Earl for killing Eliza and reanimates the earth dragon skeleton, placing himself, Feri, and Lily in its heart. They battle it and Aria destroys the skeleton with her holy blade skill while Tama rescues Feri and Lily. One of the skeletons reveals herself as Eliza and tells Reiss not to seek revenge, destroying his will to fight as the bell and the skeletons disappear. Reiss is arrested and sentenced to the guillotine by the Earl, but Aria serves the Earl tea laced with Drop of Truth, making him confess that he and his butler raped and murdered several women, including Eliza. The enraged townspeople turn on them. The Earl, the butler, and Reiss are all sentenced to life in prison. Feri and Lily have joined the party and they all bathe and argue over who deserves Tama.
8	"The Elf Girl Makes a Move"; Transliteration: "Erufu Musume no Ohikkoshi" (Japanese: エルフ娘のお引越し)	Takashi Asami	Kan'ichi Katō	Yoshihiro Takamoto	February 22, 2025
The party comes home and Arnold promotes Aria to Rank A and Stella to Rank B, but Vulcan turns down a promotion. Gladstone gifts the party a ten year supply of preserves, but they have no room to store them. Arnold suggests they move into a new house and they agree. They buy a house with a kitchen, garden, large bedroom, and a private bathhouse. That night, Tama learns that his behemoth form has evolved, making Stella even more attracted to him. The next day, Feri grows a World Tree and Lily creates a Fountain of Life in the yard, but Vulcan warns everyone to keep them secret. Arnold says a monster in the dungeon has killed people, so the party enters and slays goblins and a massive troll. Feri and Lily are also given new outfits by Vulcan. As the party bathes, they discover a function that turns the bath into a bubble bath. Aria realizes the party is her new family and vows to protect them. Meanwhile, knights separately tell the emperor and Alisha that monster attacks are intensifying, possibly due to the demons.
9	"Fated Reunion in the Imperial City!"; Transliteration: "Teito e! Unmei no Saikai" (Japanese: 帝都へ！ 運命の再会)	Shigeki Awai	Toshiaki Satō	Fumikazu Satō	March 1, 2025
Arnold tells the party that Emperor Geisel Auschra has summoned them, but Vulcan is nervous. They take a wagon to the imperial capital and are escorted to the emperor and Prince Julius. After the emperor thanks them for saving Gladstone, it is revealed that Vulcan knows them since she was once the royal smith and a veteran of the war against the demons. A demon ally named Lady Belzebuth, who can read minds, arrives. She says she needs help because four demons plan to unseal the 7th demon king, Mammon, and revive the God of Darkness, which explains Beryl’s warning. They have Vulcan forge new weapons, Julius train Stella, Belzebuth teach Feri and Lily new spells, and the retired Alisha is asked to train Aria. Aria is starstruck to meet her again as she dreams of training with her. During sparring, Alisha easily beats Aria with a wooden sword and Julius easily beats Stella with his superior skill, but they slowly improve. While they bathe, Alisha and Belzebuth reveal they are both married to the Grand Mage, who is from Japan and transported from Earth, but is busy and cannot help them. Alisha tells Tama that she knows he is a behemoth, but will keep the secret. Eventually, the four demons are detected in separate locations. Cedric and his party will deal with two of them, but one is in Alisha's hometown of Alphes and one is in Ruine, the town the party lives in.
10	"The Powers of Tama and Aria"; Transliteration: "Tama to Aria no Mezameru Chikara" (Japanese: タマとアリアの目覚める力)	Yūji Kanzaki & Keita Nakano	Tetsuo Hirakawa	ROMANoV HiGA	March 8, 2025
Alisha goes to Alphes alone while Aria's party and Julius go to Ruine. They meet Cedric's party (Cedric decided go alone) and enter the dungeon. After demonstrating their new skills and weapons on some monsters, Cedric's party is occupied fighting trolls while the rest meet the demon Vasaago. Vasaago summons a cyclops and orthus to fight the party while he fights Julius. Julius is quickly knocked out and Vasaago escapes to the demon realm. When the party starts losing, Tama has no choice but to transform into his evolved behemoth form. In Alphes, Alisha finds the demon Revi bathing. Revi turns into a dragon while boasting of her power, but Alisha effortlessly kills her. Aria and the others mistake Tama's form for a holy beast. When outmatched, the orthus and cyclops commit suicide to perform a powerful flamethrower and create a homing lance respectively. Tama matches the flamethrower with his own while Stella blocks the lance, expecting to die. Aria awakens a new skill, Excalibur, and fires a holy blast that destroys the lance and the orthus' body. Tama reverts to his cat form. Back in the capital, Belzebuth says that Vasaago's forces are moving towards Aria's home village of Lumines. They are after the Philosopher's Stone stored there. Everyone volunteers to defend it.
11	"The Philosopher's Stone & the Secret of Lumines"; Transliteration: "Kenja no Ishi to Rumirusu no Himitsu" (Japanese: 賢者ノ石とルミルスの秘密)	JOL-chan	Kan'ichi Katō	Hong Min-seok	March 15, 2025
Everyone, including Arnold, sails to Lumines, but Cedric is still busy. They are greeted by the village chief Elvan, and a squad led by the Amazon Gusione and Aria's mother Leona. After the party meets Aria's friend Fionne and her elemental cat Leo, Elvan shows them the Philosopher's Stone is stored in a massive tree. Leona hosts the party and Aria is worried about her getting hurt, but Leona assures her that she became a warrior to defend the village. Gusione tries to steal the Philosopher's Stone, but Alisha unmasks her as a demon and kills her. Gusione's owl familiar escapes and reports to Vasaago, who opens portals to let his army invade the village. Alisha surrounds the village with a force field that kills the demons on contact, but Vasaago is uncaring and crashes his forces against it until holes are made in it allowing them to enter. After Julius makes a rousing speech, everyone charges into battle.
12	"Sacred Blade & Beast"; Transliteration: "Seinaru Yaiba to Seinaru Kemono" (Japanese: 聖なる刃と聖なる獣)	Keita Nakano & Takashi Asami	Tetsuo Hirakawa	Kin'ya Nakamura	March 22, 2025
As everyone battles Vasaago's forces, Cedric arrives and saves Arnold from a sneak attack, then they fight together. Vasaago summons the dragon Nidhogg and rides it into battle. Tama takes his evolved behemoth form and Aria rides him to take the pair on. Vasaago gets past them, breaks into the tree, and has Nidhogg swallow the Philosopher's Stone before trying to ride it through a portal to the demon realm in the sky. Aria jumps on Nidhogg and tries to fight Vasaago, but jumps off when she notices Tama hesitating out of fear of hitting her. Tama and Nidhogg clash, then while still falling, Aria blasts them with Excalibur, vaporizing Vasaago and Nidhogg while leaving the Philosopher's Stone intact. Tama catches both while the demons retreat. Tama returns to cat form and everyone celebrates with a feast. Vulcan beats Howard in a drinking contest. Julius asks Stella to join his army, but is refused. Belzebuth praises Lily and Feri for their part in the battle and conjures exotic food. Alisha grants Aria and Tama the titles Sacred Blade and Sacred Beast. Upon returning to Ruine, everyone is praised as heroes. While the party bathes, Aria, Vulcan, and Stella beg Tama to take his behemoth form and have sex with them, horrifying him. The party later wanders as Tama narrates that they have many adventures ahead and he will continue to protect Aria and their friends.
