= Happy at Home =

Japanese anthology manga series

- Cover of the volume

家が好きな人 (Ie ga Suki na Hito)
- Genre: Slice of life
- Manga
- Written by: Chiaki Ida
- Published by: Jitsugyo no Nihon Sha
- English publisher: NA: Kana
- Imprint: Ruelle Comics
- Published: February 1, 2023
- Volumes: 1

Happy at Home (家が好きな人, Ie ga Suki na Hito) is a Japanese anthology manga series written and illustrated by Chiaki Ida. It was published under Jitsugyo no Nihon Sha's Ruelle Comics imprint in February 2023.

== Synopsis ==
The series is centered around the lives of five different women in their respective households.

== Publication ==
Written and illustrated by Chiaki Ida, Happy at Home was published under Jitsugyo no Nihon Sha's Ruelle Comics manga imprint on February 1, 2023. In August 2026, Abrams ComicArts announced that it had licensed the series for English publication under its Kana imprint in May 2027.

No.	Original release date	Original ISBN	North American release date	North American ISBN
1	February 1, 2023	978-4-408-64080-8	May 4, 2027	978-1-419-77829-2

== Reception ==
The series was ranked twentieth in Da Vinci's "Book of the Year" list in 2023. The series was ranked seventh in the 2024 edition of Takarajimasha's Kono Manga ga Sugoi! guidebook's list of the best manga for female readers. The series won in the Manga category of the Prix Babelio 2026.
