= Mysterious Disappearances =

Japanese manga series

- First tankōbon volume cover

怪異と乙女と神隠し (Kaii to Otome to Kamikakushi)
- Genre: Comedy drama; Mystery; Supernatural
- Manga
- Written by: Nujima
- Published by: Shogakukan
- English publisher: NA: Seven Seas Entertainment
- Magazine: Yawaraka Spirits
- Original run: October 18, 2019 – present
- Volumes: 11
- Anime television series
- Directed by: Tomomi Mochizuki
- Produced by: Joutarou Ishigami; Reiko Sasaki; Shousei Itou; Yuu Okazaki; Aya Iizuka
- Written by: Tomomi Mochizuki
- Music by: Kayo Konishi; Yukio Kondō
- Studio: Zero-G
- Licensed by: Crunchyroll
- Original network: AT-X, Tokyo MX, BS NTV, Kansai TV
- Original run: April 10, 2024 – June 26, 2024
- Episodes: 12
- icon

Mysterious Disappearances (Japanese: 怪異と乙女と神隠し, Hepburn: Kaii to Otome to Kamikakushi; lit. 'Mysteries, Maidens and Mysterious Disappearances') is a Japanese manga series written and illustrated by Nujima. It has been serialized on Shogakukan's Yawaraka Spirits website since October 2019. An anime television series adaptation produced by Zero-G aired from April to June 2024.

== Plot ==
Sumireko Ogawa is a bookstore clerk who dreamed of writing novels in her youth. She teams up with her coworker, Ren Adashino, who is hiding secrets of his own, to investigate supernatural phenomena happening in the city.

== Characters ==
Sumireko Ogawa (緒川 菫子, Ogawa Sumireko)
Voiced by: Fairouz Ai
A 28-year-old woman, first discovered her passion for writing as a teenager but struggled to maintain her creative drive as she grew older. While working at a bookstore, she stumbled upon a mysterious grimoire—one that accidentally transformed her back into a child. Without Ren's timely intervention, the magic would have killed her. Now, she assists Ren and Oto in solving supernatural mysteries across Tokyo. Having absorbed some of the grimoire's power, Sumireko can freely shift between her adult and child forms.
Ren Adashino (化野 蓮, Adashino Ren)
Voiced by: Daiki Yamashita
Sumireko's co-worker at the bookstore. Taking on the appearance of a human teen, he actually is a being from outside Earth, and believes that solving enough supernatural mysteries and collecting the cursed objects behind them will be enough to buy a ticket home for himself and his sister.
Oto Adashino (化野 乙, Adashino Oto)
Voiced by: Eri Yukimura
Manami Uname (畦目 真奈美, Uname Manami)
Voiced by: Yui Horie
Shizuku Hayami (早見 シズク, Hayami Shizuku)
Voiced by: Rie Takahashi
Nodoka Ametsuchi (天地 のどか, Ametsuchi Nodoka)
Voiced by: Saya Aizawa
Jikū no Ossan (時空のおっさん)
Voiced by: Yūya Uchida
Jormun Himeuo (姫魚 よるむん, Himeuo Yorumun)
Voiced by: Naomi Ōzora
Station Attendant (駅係員, Ekikakariin)
Voiced by: Masako Nozawa

== Media ==
=== Manga ===
Written by and illustrated by Nujima, Mysterious Disappearances started on Shogakukan's Yawaraka Spirits website on October 18, 2019. Shogakukan has collected its chapters into individual tankōbon volumes. The first volume was released on April 10, 2020. As of September 11, 2026, eleven volumes have been released.

In July 2023, Seven Seas Entertainment announced that it licensed the series for English publication, with the first volume released in May 2024.

==== Volumes ====
No.	Original release date	Original ISBN	English release date	English ISBN
1	April 10, 2020	978-4-09-860559-0	May 21, 2024	979-8-88843-755-1
2	October 12, 2020	978-4-09-860749-5	July 16, 2024	979-8-88843-756-8
3	May 12, 2021	978-4-09-861021-1	October 15, 2024	979-8-89160-049-2
4	December 10, 2021	978-4-09-861225-3	January 14, 2025	979-8-89160-050-8
5	January 12, 2023	978-4-09-861617-6	April 15, 2025	979-8-89160-051-5
6	July 12, 2023	978-4-09-861833-0	July 29, 2025	979-8-89373-018-0
7	March 29, 2024	978-4-09-862744-8	October 28, 2025	979-8-89373-567-3
8	June 11, 2024	978-4-09-862878-0	February 24, 2026	979-8-89373-700-4
9	April 11, 2025	978-4-09-863454-5	June 23, 2026	979-8-89765-119-1
10	December 12, 2025	978-4-09-863748-5	October 27, 2026	979-8-89863-216-8
11	September 11, 2026	978-4-09-864129-1	–	—

=== Anime ===
An anime television series adaptation was announced on January 12, 2023. It is produced by Zero-G, and written and directed by Tomomi Mochizuki, with character designs handled by Takuya Tani, and music composed by Kayo Konishi and Yukio Kondō. The series aired from April 10 to June 26, 2024, on AT-X and other networks. The opening theme song is "Hazard Symbol", performed by Yuyu, and the ending theme song is "Shuku Somete Shinzō" (朱く染めて心臓; "Scarlet-Dyed Heart"), performed by Nonoka Ōbuchi. Crunchyroll streamed the series worldwide excluding Japan and China.

==== Episodes ====
No.	Title (Note: All English titles are taken from Crunchyroll.)	Directed by	Storyboarded by	Original release date
1	"The Cursed Book, the Maiden, and the Birthday"; Transliteration: "Noroisho to Otome to Tanjōbi" (Japanese: 呪書と乙女と誕生日)	Takeshi Shiga	Tomomi Mochizuki	April 10, 2024
2	"Schoolhouse, Drool, and an Apartment Wife"; Transliteration: "Kōsha to Yodare to Danchi Tsuma" (Japanese: 校舎とよだれと団地妻)	Kentaro Mizuno	Daiji Iwanaga	April 17, 2024
3	"Horns, Bullying, and a Hair Ornament"; Transliteration: "Tsuno to Ijime to Kamikazari" (Japanese: 角といじめと髪飾り)	Hidehiko Kadota	Daiji Iwanaga	April 24, 2024
4	"A Bath, Cleaning and a Surprise"; Transliteration: "O Furo to Sōji to Sapuraizu" (Japanese: お風呂と掃除とサプライズ)	Yusuke Onoda	Yoshitaka Yasuda	May 1, 2024
5	"Underwear, Snacks, and Scarlet Clothes"; Transliteration: "Shitagi to Okashi to Akai Fuku" (Japanese: 下着とお菓子と紅い服)	Takeshi Shiga	Tomomi Mochizuki	May 8, 2024
6	"A Curiosity, a Maid, and a Cultured Young Lady"; Transliteration: "Kaī to Meido to Ojōsama" (Japanese: 怪異とメイドとお嬢様)	Hidehiko Kadota	Hidehiko Kadota	May 15, 2024
7	"A Station, Scissors, and a Haircut"; Transliteration: "Eki to Hasami to Sanpatsu" (Japanese: 駅とハサミと散髪)	Keita Nakano	Shin Matsuo	May 22, 2024
8	"A Book, An Affair, and a Mermaid"; Transliteration: "Hon to Furin to Ningyohime" (Japanese: 本と不倫と人魚姫)	Rei Mano	Yoshitaka Yasuda	May 29, 2024
9	"Dreams, Dance, and a Tsukumogami"; Transliteration: "Yume to Dansu to Tsukumogami" (Japanese: 夢とダンスと付喪神)	Takeshi Shiga	Shin Matsuo	June 5, 2024
10	"A Live Performance, a Curse, and the Person Inside"; Transliteration: "Raibu to Noroi to Naka no Hito" (Japanese: ライブと呪いと中の人)	Masaki Utsunomiya	Daiji Iwanaga; Yoshitaka Yasuda	June 12, 2024
11	"Cats, Swimsuits, and a Black Aeonium"; Transliteration: "Neko to Mizugi to Kuro Hōshi" (Japanese: 猫と水着と黒法師)	Reiji Sugii	Matsuzono	June 19, 2024
12	"A Ticket, a Video, and Mysterious Disappearances"; Transliteration: "Kippu to Dōga to Kamikakushi" (Japanese: 切符と動画と神隠し)	Tomomi Mochizuki	Tomomi Mochizuki	June 26, 2024

== Reception ==
In 2020, the manga was one of the nominees for the sixth Next Manga Awards in the web category.

The manga was recommended in 2021 by manga artist Akihito Tsukushi.
