= Isekai Izakaya "Nobu" =

Japanese light novel series and its franchise

- First light novel volume cover

異世界居酒屋「のぶ」
- Novel series
- Written by: Natsuya Semikawa
- Published by: Shōsetsuka ni Narō
- Original run: 2012 – present
- Light novel
- Written by: Natsuya Semikawa
- Illustrated by: Kururi
- Published by: Takarajimasha
- Imprint: Kono Light Novel ga Sugoi! Bunko
- Original run: 2014 – present
- Volumes: 7
- Manga
- Illustrated by: Virginia Nitōhei
- Published by: Kadokawa Shoten
- English publisher: NA: Udon Entertainment
- Magazine: Young Ace
- Original run: July 2015 – present
- Volumes: 22
- Original net animation

Isekai Izakaya: Japanese Food from Another World
- Directed by: Katsumi Ono
- Produced by: Atsushi Umezaki
- Written by: Shin Yoshida
- Music by: Mito; Sunrise Music Publishing
- Studio: Sunrise
- Released: April 13, 2018 – September 14, 2018
- Episodes: 24
- Television drama

Season 1
- Directed by: Hiroshi Shinagawa
- Written by: Hiroshi Shinagawa
- Studio: WOWOW
- Original run: May 15, 2020 – July 17, 2020
- Episodes: 10
- Television drama

Season 2
- Directed by: Hiroshi Shinagawa
- Written by: Hiroshi Shinagawa
- Studio: WOWOW
- Original run: May 27, 2022 – July 29, 2022
- Episodes: 10
- Television drama

Season 3 ~The Emperor and Princess of Oilia~
- Directed by: Hiroshi Shinagawa
- Written by: Hiroshi Shinagawa
- Studio: WOWOW
- Original run: January 13, 2023 – March 17, 2023
- Episodes: 10
- icon

Isekai Izakaya "Nobu" (異世界居酒屋「のぶ」; lit. Alternate World Bar "Nobu") is a Japanese light novel series written by Natsuya Semikawa and illustrated by Kururi. It began serialization online in 2012 on the user-generated novel publishing website Shōsetsuka ni Narō. It won the site's Ni Narō Con Taishō award before being acquired by Takarajimasha, who have published seven volumes since 2014 under their Kono Light Novel ga Sugoi! Bunko imprint. A manga adaptation with art by Virginia Nitōhei began serialization in Kadokawa Shoten's seinen manga magazine Young Ace from July 2015. As of August 2026, there have been 22 tankōbon volumes released in Japan. Udon Entertainment announced during their panel at San Diego Comic-Con that they have licensed the manga. As of March 15, 2022, volume 10 ISBN 9781772942163 has been published in English. An original net animation adaptation by Sunrise premiered from April 13 to September 14, 2018.

== Plot ==
Nobuyuki Yazawa owns a Kyoto izakaya where the waitress Shinobu Senke serves customers. Three months before the start of the series, Shinobu went to an Inari shrine and prayed for the izakaya's success. Inari-sama has responded by making the front door open into the old capital city of Aitheria in another world.

== Characters ==
=== Izakaya Nobu ===
Nobuyuki Yazawa (矢澤 信之, Yazawa Nobuyuki)
Voiced by: Tomokazu Sugita
Played by: Ryohei Otani
The owner of Izakaya Nobu, who established the restaurant after he left his former employment and cooks for customers from the other world. He is referred to as "Taishō" by everyone. Over time, he starts integrating and incorporating unfamiliar Western foods into the menu, such as schnitzel and al ajillo, to expand his field of cooking.
Shinobu Senke (千家 しのぶ, Senke Shinobu)
Voiced by: Suzuko Mimori
Played by: Rena Takeda
Izakaya Nobu's waitress. The daughter of Nobuyuki's former employer, she became a waitress for Izakaya Nobu after running away from an arranged marriage. Despite her cheerful attitude, she tends to act childishly when Taishō makes fun of her; she can be very stern and serious when anyone disrespects Nobu.
Eva (エーファ, Ēfa)
Voiced by: Misaki Kuno
Played by: Yuzumi Shintani
A dishwasher at Izakaya Nobu, who was hired after she tried to take a water faucet on a mistaken pretense. She is so far the only resident to cross into the "other world" (Japan) and speak to Byakko. She has two younger siblings, whom she brings food back home after completing her shift.
Hermina (ヘルミーナ, Herumīna)
Voiced by: Maaya Uchida
Played by: Akane Hotta
A waitress at Izakaya Nobu and Berthold's wife, who grew up in a fishing village; due to this, she's efficient at handling live seafood. Despite her kind nature, it has been hinted that she can be very fearsome if necessary. Being a daughter of a squid fisherman, she is quite strong for her size, with good wrist and grip. She later leaves Nobu temporarily on her maternal leave.
Hans (ハンス, Hansu)
Voiced by: Atsushi Abe
Played by: Yutaka Kobayashi
A junior Palace Guard in Aitheria, he is a regular patron after being introduced to the restaurant by Nikolaus. He is also a glassmaker, Lorentz's son. He wants to eventually leave the guards to pursue other interests, and usually goes to Taishō for advice. He also has a small crush on Shinobu. Later, he quits his guard position, and begins his culinary apprenticeship under Taishō's teachings.

=== Aitheria Guard ===
Nikolaus (ニコラウス, Nikorausu)
Voiced by: Showtaro Morikubo
Played by: Jin Shirasu
A Palace Guard in Aitheria, he introduced his fellow peers to the restaurant. Despite being known to be a womanizer, he is observant of those who come in and out of the kingdom.
Berthold (ベルトホルト, Berutohoruto)
Voiced by: Katsuyuki Konishi
Played by: Shinnosuke Abe
He is the Captain of the palace guard; thus Hans and Nikolaus' superior. He is also Hermina's husband. After being introduced to Nobu by Hans, he instantly fell in love with Nobu's chicken dishes. Originally, he was fearful of seafood, specifically squid, as his great-grandfather told him about a giant squid encounter he had, his fear of squid further escalated when he fought an enemy knight with a squid emblem. It is revealed he was raised in the mountains, the exact opposite lifestyle to Hermina's.

=== Water Transportation Guild ===
Godhardt (ゴドハルト, Godoharuto)
Voiced by: Ryotaro Okiayu
Played by: Ryuhei Watabe
The leader of Water Dragon's Scale, Aitheria's largest guild. Out of the guild leaders, he is the most temperamental and feared by many of the customers. After learning about Nobu's cooking of eel and octopus, he falls in love with Taishō's cooking. Despite his gruff and fearsome appearance, it is noted that he is actually a huge lover of poetry.
Eleonora (エレオノーラ, Ereonōra)
Voiced by: Kana Ueda
Played by: Arisa Yagi
The leader of Harpies Shanty along with her mother. Harpies Shanty is the richest and most influential guild in the kingdom. She chooses to be a single woman, as she is picky about choosing men; however, she's started to show feelings for Nikolaus. As per her sense of beauty inherited from her mother, she's taken a liking about Nobu's beautiful dishes and tablewares, especially with Reishu and fishes.
Reinhold (ラインホルト, Rainhoruto)
Voiced by: Takanori Hoshino
Played by: Yuuki Ogoe
The leader of Golden Willow's Boat, who recently inherited the company after his father died. His company, which was founded by his grandfather, is the longest-running guild in the kingdom; however, due to competition, the company begins to deteriorate, with many employees leaving for Water Dragon's Scale or Harpies Shanty. It is not until with the help of "Nobu", that useless fish like eel turn out to be edible. Now, the three guilds work together as a partnership instead of competition. He soon begins introducing Taishō to many weird catches such as octopus to see if the food is both edible and profitable.

=== The Craftsmans Guild ===
Lorentz (ローレンツ, Rōrentsu)
Voiced by: Takaya Kuroda
Played by: Tomoharu Shoji
A lead Glass Maker and Hans' father. He also acts as an intermediary between the Water Transport Guilds. His students provide "Nobu" with the bento boxes for the eel dishes.
Holger (ホルガー, Horugā)
Voiced by: Tsuyoshi Koyama
A lead Blacksmith and a friendly rival of Lorentz. He usually keeps Taishō up to date of the news going on in the capital.

=== Nobles ===
Bachschouf (バッケスホーフ, Bakkesuhōfu)
Voiced by: Akio Otsuka
Played by: Eisuke Sasai
The Aiteria City Council Chairman who abuses his power; even with the combined efforts of the guilds, the church, and the town; they are powerless to stop him. He uses his power in attempts to buy off "Nobu" and attempt to get Nobuyuki and Shinobu arrested for breaking capital laws due to their alcohol being lager; unaware its technically NOT the capital inside the restaurant. He also uses his power in attempts to get the hand of both Shinobu and Hermina, the latter getting her marriage annulled. It was thanks to Gernot, that he was able to expose Bachschouf for his crimes.
Brantano (ブランターノ, Burantāno)
Voiced by: Junichi Suwabe
Played by: Houka Kinoshita
A Baron and self-professed foodie. He pesters Nobu at first, but after being served his favourite meal, humbly takes his leave. He later returns, helping to discover evidence against Bachschouf behind the scenes and saving Nobu.
Johan Gustav (ヨハン・グスタフ, Yohan Gusutafu)
Voiced by: Daisuke Namikawa
Played by: Makoto Shinada
A nobleman who adopted Hildegard after the death of his older brother and sister-in-law.
Hildegard (ヒルデガルド, Hirudegarudo)
Voiced by: Yoshino Nanjo
Played by: Kana Hayama
Hildegard is Johan Gustav's niece, who was adopted by her uncle after the death of her parents. Despite her age, she is soon to be married. She used to be a picky eater with a weak stomach, due to the fact that she only ended up tasting cold dishes, after her servants tested for food poisoning as always. After she eats a warm and heartfelt meal at Nobu, she feels satisfied with the great hospitality of the restaurant.
The Former Emperor (Conrad IV) (先帝, (コンラート四世), Sentei, (Konraato Yonsei))
Johan's uncle and Hildegard's grand-uncle. It was thanks to him that after his personal dining experience in Nobu, he was able to repeal the ban of lager; as well as deal with the conflicts in the Northern Area.

=== Townspeople ===
Damian (ダミアン)
Voiced by: Kazuhiko Inoue
Played by: Zen Kajihara
A servant who works for Bachschouf and previously worked for Baron Branton before being fired. During his employment under Branton, he tries to use his employer's name and authority to pressure Nobu into renting out the entire restaurant for the day, after which he is fired and finds new work under Bachschouf. He later tries to harass and usurp Nobu once more after Shinobu kicked him out for mistreating her and the business. In the anime version, Damian is exiled from Aitheria after Bachschouf's arrest. In the manga version, however, he flees from the back door of Nobu after his failed attempt at the witch hunt along with Archbishop Rodrigo, and gets trapped by Byakko's alternate dimension shrine gates. Later, he gets arrested by guards, along with his entire properties confiscated, until he later gets amnesty from the wedding of Emperor Conrad V, and ultimately wanders and becomes a drunkard in the United Kingdom.
Gernot (ゲーアノート, Gēanōto)

Voiced by: Kenjiro Tsuda

Played by: Kazuki Namioka
The Aiteria tax collector, who is known for being quite ruthless. When attempting to collect taxes from Nobu (which he cannot as its not actually part of his domain), Shinobu serves him Napolitan, a pasta dish that is not on the menu; it was this dish that made him lenient on Nobu; as the dish reminded him of his childhood. Because Napolitan was not on the menu, Shinobu had to make the dish for Gernot behind Nobuyuki's back until he found out; to which the dish is now a special item for Gernot. When Bachschouf attempted to take Nobu, Gernot did everything in his power to find evidence to clear the bar's name; which he did and at the same time catch Bachschouf in his corruption.
Due to a misunderstanding regarding a certain handkerchief in Eva's possession after the former emperor visited Nobu, Gernot came to the misassumption that Eva was the former emperor's granddaughter, and one of the reasons why the ban on lager was lifted. After coming to this wrongful conclusion, he would not hear anything else and decided to take the "secret" with him to his grave.
Carmi (カミル, Kamiru) and Ignaz (イグナーツ, Igunātsu)
Voiced by: Nobunaga Shimazaki (Carmi)
Voiced by: Yūki Ono (Ignaz)
Soon to be brother-in-laws, who tend to make wacky bets with each other; whether it be Carmi trying different types of raw fish or Ignaz dressing as a woman in attempts to fool the customers and staff of Nobu. Ignaz refers Carmi as "Carmi the Coward" due to his personality.
Frank (フランク, Furanku)
Voiced by: Nobuyuki Kobushi
The old capital's local butcher. He's responsible for providing Nobu with his daily wholesale supplies of fresh meats and other wild games.

=== The Holy Order ===
Edwin (エトヴィン, Etovin)
Voiced by: Chō
Played by: Ryosei Tayama
The town's newly appointed deacon from the Holy Order, who took a liking to Nobu's alcohol. He also provides the Cardinal's approval letter to Berthold and Hermina for their marriage to prevent it from being annulled by Bachschouf. At "Nobu", his favourite foods are Shiokara, Shutō, Horse Mackerel, and other dishes suitable for drinking.
Thomas (トマス, Tomasu)
A young priest, as well as the superior and former student of Deacon Edwin. When Edwin is summoned, he chooses Thomas as his temporary replacement, while he has gone. The two discuss rumors about a witch search among the Holy Order. Besides his works as a priest, he also focus upon astrology as well. Although he's quite a disciplinarian, and unwilling to drink alcohol, he could actually become drunk at the first few sips. At "Nobu", his favourite foods are eggplants and Scomber.

=== Others ===
Byakko (白狐; white fox)
Voiced by: Asami Shimoda
She is God's Messenger, who serves under Ukanomitama. She takes the form of either a mikobeing of the Nobu shop from time to time. The only one who knows about her identity is Eva; after she chased her, in her fox form, through the magical door into Japan. In the anime, she has visited the bar and made contact with Nobuyuki and Shinobu in her human form, but remained silent around them, not revealing her identity; usually, giving a tip of Japanese yen instead of the Aitheria currency. Her favorite food is Abura-age (油揚げ).
Jean-Francois Mount De La Vigny (フランソワ・モーント・ド・ラ・ヴィニー, Jan Furansowa Mōnto Do Ra Vinī)
Voiced by: Ryōhei Kimura
An Otogishu, a spy who was sent from the Eastern Kingdom of Oilia. He stumbled upon Nobu to gather intel; there Shinobu served him sample salads. Edwin seemed to already know his identity. After gathering intel from Shinobu and Nobu, he realized that Aitheria was too strong of a country; not realizing Nobu came from another world, where resources are abundant. Because of the place he rented during his mission, it's prevented Berthold and Herminia from moving in after their wedding, despite Berthold already buying the home.
Leontaine du Louv (リオンティーヌ・デュ・ルーヴ, Riontīnu Dyu Rūbu)
Voiced by: Mikako Komatsu
Played by: Seina Sagiri
A female knight from the Eastern Kingdom of Oilia, who fought Berthold. She wears the armor with the squid emblem, which causes Berthold to relive his fear of squid. In turn, she refers to Berthold as The Demon after defeating many of her soldiers. Berthold managed to defeat her, but spared her life. Since then, she looked for Berthold to be his wife; using an Encounter Amulet to try and find him. After the war, she became a mercenary and escort which include The Witches of Brantano Forest, whom she provided an Encounter Amulet to Ingrid. When encountering Nikolaus, he determined that she was a mercenary, then directed her to Nobu after asking about any good places in Aitheria. She becomes friendly with Hermina after learning they're both from fishing villages; however, she eventually learns from Nobuyuki and Shinobu that Berthold is already married to Hermina. Since she's escorted the cardinal, she returns to the ancient capital once again. After completing her mission, she's replaced Hermina as an employee of "Nobu" temporarily, who's on her maternal leave.
Ingrid (イングリド, Ingurido) and Camilla (カミラ, Kamira)
The so-called witches who appear during the Night of the Dual Moons are actually a medical doctor, Ingrid, and her disciple, Camila. The duo live in Brantano Forest because of how isolated it is. Despite Ingrid's age, she has a childish personality, usually craving things like sweets and alcohol; while her disciple, Camilla, has a serious demeanor; usually reprimanding her for it. Camila also hates being treated like a kid. Despite being both a doctor and a pharmacist, Ingrid does practice magic as a hobby and is able to detect the magic emitting from "Nobu". Camilla gets upset about Ingrid's hobby due to it causing the townspeople to fear them. On top of that, Ingrid always gets drunk at "Nobu" first thing during the broad daylight, which upsets Camilla even further. At "Nobu", Ingrid's favourite foods are Pudding and Beni shōga (Red Pickled Ginger), and can accept Sashimi there (although she dislikes meat), while Camilla's favourite foods are Onigiri and Sashimi.

== Media ==
=== Light novels ===
No.	Title	Release date	ISBN
1	Alternate World Bar "Nobu"; Isekai Izakaya "Nobu" (異世界居酒屋「のぶ」)	September 10, 2014	978-4-8002-3057-7
2	Alternate World Bar "Nobu" – Second Drink; Isekai Izakaya "Nobu" Ni Haime (異世界居酒屋「のぶ」二杯目)	February 9, 2015	978-4-8002-3721-7
3	Alternate World Bar "Nobu" – Third Drink; Isekai Izakaya "Nobu" San Haime (異世界居酒屋「のぶ」三杯目)	June 24, 2015	978-4-8002-4174-0
4	Alternate World Bar "Nobu" – Fourth Drink; Isekai Izakaya "Nobu" Yon Haime (異世界居酒屋「のぶ」四杯目)	December 4, 2015	978-4-8002-4877-0
5	Alternate World Bar "Nobu" – Fifth Drink; Isekai Izakaya "Nobu" Go Haime (異世界居酒屋「のぶ」五杯目)	April 7, 2018	978-4-8002-5903-5
6	Alternate World Bar "Nobu" – Sixth Drink; Isekai Izakaya "Nobu" Roku Haime (異世界居酒屋「のぶ」六杯目)	May 25, 2019	978-4-8002-9523-1
7	Alternate World Bar "Nobu" – Seventh Drink; Isekai Izakaya "Nobu" Nanatu Haime (異世界居酒屋「のぶ」七杯目)	July 8, 2021	978-4-299-01830-4

=== Manga ===
A manga adaptation with art by Virginia Nitōhei began serialization in Kadokawa Shoten's seinen manga magazine Young Ace from July 2015. As of August 2026, the series has been collected in 22 Japanese tankōbon volumes. Ten of them have been translated into English. Udon Entertainment previewed volume 1 on March 29, 2018, with the cover for the September 2018 release.

In October 2024, Nitōhei announced on X that volume 19 of the manga would not have bonus features, alleging that a promise by the publisher that they would be paid for their work had been revoked.

=== Anime ===
An anime adaptation of the light novel series was announced in November 2016. The original net animation (ONA) is produced by Sunrise under the title Isekai Izakaya: Japanese Food from Another World (異世界居酒屋〜古都アイテーリアの居酒屋のぶ〜, Isekai Izakaya ~Koto Aitheria no Izakaya Nobu~) and it premiered worldwide simultaneously on April 13, 2018, on different streaming services. Katsumi Ono directed the anime with scripts written by Shin Yoshida and character designs by Mariko Ito. The ending theme is "Prosit!" by musical trio Clammbon. Crunchyroll is streaming the series.

No.	English title (Note: All English titles are taken from Crunchyroll.) Original Japanese title	Original release date
1	"Potatoes in Oden"; Transliteration: "Oden no Jagaimo" (Japanese: おでんのじゃがいも)	April 13, 2018
2	"Juicy Kara-Age"; Transliteration: "Wakadori no Karāge" (Japanese: 若鶏の唐揚げ)	April 13, 2018
3	"Rich Girl and the Impossible Order"; Transliteration: "Ojōsama no nandai" (Japanese: お嬢様の難題)	April 27, 2018
4	"The First Kaisendon"; Transliteration: "Hajimete no kaisendonburi" (Japanese: はじめての海鮮丼)	April 27, 2018
5	"Shinobu's Special Napolitan"; Transliteration: "Shinobu-chan no tokusei Naporitan" (Japanese: しのぶちゃんの特製ナポリタン)	May 11, 2018
6	"Kiss Day"; Transliteration: "Kisu no hi" (Japanese: キスの日)	May 11, 2018
7	"The Burglar"; Transliteration: "Nusutto (nu~tsutto)" (Japanese: 盗人（ぬすっと）)	May 25, 2018
8	"After Work Tonjiru"; Transliteration: "Shigoto-gaeri no Tonjiru" (Japanese: 仕事帰りの豚汁)	May 25, 2018
9	"The Company Commander's Weakness"; Transliteration: "Chū taichō no Jakuten" (Japanese: 中隊長の弱点)	June 8, 2018
10	"Uninvited Guests"; Transliteration: "Manekarezar-Kyaku" (Japanese: 招かれざる客)	June 8, 2018
11	"A Clash of Masters"; Transliteration: "Oyakata Kenka" (Japanese: 親方喧嘩)	June 22, 2018
12	"Beauty and the Abura-age"; Transliteration: "Bijo to Aburaage" (Japanese: 美女と油揚げ)	June 22, 2018
13	"Menchi-Katsu"; Transliteration: "Menchikatsu" (Japanese: メンチカツ)	July 6, 2018
14	"The Spy and the Salad"; Transliteration: "Mittei to Sarada" (Japanese: 密偵とサラダ)	July 6, 2018
15	"Kabayaki Without Honor"; Transliteration: "Jingi naki Kabayaki" (Japanese: 仁義なき蒲焼き)	July 20, 2018
16	"The Company Commander's Triumphant Return"; Transliteration: "Chū taichō no gaisen" (Japanese: 中隊長の凱旋)	July 20, 2018
17	"A Tempura Early Summer Mix"; Transliteration: "Shoka no Tenpura Moriawase" (Japanese: 初夏の天ぷら盛り合わせ)	August 3, 2018
18	"The Great Drunken Kara-age Debate"; Transliteration: "San Suijin no Karaage Mondou" (Japanese: 三酔人のカラアゲ問答)	August 3, 2018
19	"The Female Merc"; Transliteration: "On'na Yōhei" (Japanese: 女傭兵)	August 17, 2018
20	"The Secret of Whatsontap: Part 1"; Transliteration: "Toriaezunama no Himitsu (Zenpen)" (Japanese: トリアエズナマの秘密 (前編))	August 17, 2018
21	"The Secret of Whatsontap: Part 2"; Transliteration: "Toriaezunama no Himitsu (Kōhen)" (Japanese: トリアエズナマの秘密（後編）)	August 31, 2018
22	"The Old Man and Fish"; Transliteration: "Rōjin to Sakana" (Japanese: 老人と魚)	August 31, 2018
23	"The Tale of the Three Northern Territories Conference"; Transliteration: "Hoppou San Ryouhou Kaigi no Tenmatsu" (Japanese: 北方三領邦会議之顛末)	September 14, 2018
24	"Ale from the Ancient City"; Transliteration: "Koto no Ēru" (Japanese: 古都のエール)	September 14, 2018

=== Drama ===
A drama adaptation aired on WOWOW between May and July 2020 for ten episodes. A second season was broadcast on WOWOW between May and July 2022 with another 10 episodes. A third season, titled "Isekai Izakaya 'Nobu' Season 3 ~Emperor and Princess of Oilia~", aired between January and March 2023 on WOWOW Prime and WOWOW 4K. As in the previous seasons Hiroshi Shinagawa served as the director and writer of the script, Rena Takeda and Ryohei Otani act as the leads in all three seasons.

== See also ==
- Easygoing Territory Defense by the Optimistic Lord, another light novel series with the same illustrator
- Magic Maker, another light novel series with the same illustrator
