= Manga Sunday =

Japanese manga magazine

Manga Sunday 週刊漫画サンデー
- Cover of 22–29 August 2006 issue
- Categories: Seinen manga
- Frequency: Weekly
- First issue: August 11, 1959; 67 years ago
- Final issue: February 19, 2013; 13 years ago
- Company: Jitsugyo no Nihon Sha
- Country: Japan
- Language: Japanese
- Website: Official site (archived)

Manga Sunday (Japanese: 漫画サンデー, Hepburn: Manga Sandē), also known by the nickname Mansun (漫サン), is a defunct Japanese weekly seinen manga magazine published by Jitsugyo no Nihon Sha. It started to be published under the name Weekly Manga Sunday (週刊漫画サンデー, Shūkan Manga Sandē) in 1959. On June 5, 2012, it start to be published twice in a month and the "Weekly" was dropped from its name. On February 19, 2013, the last issue was published and the magazine was declared defunct by Jitsugyo no Nihon Sha.

== Serialized works ==
Listed alphabetically by title.

- Robot boy Dotakon (Hosuke Fukuchi)
- First Human Giatrus (Shunji Sonoyama)
- Heisei Harenchi Gakuen (Go Nagai)
- Hitler (Shigeru Mizuki, 1971)
- The Laughing Salesman (Fujiko Fujio A)
- Mandaraya no Ryouta (Jun Hatanaka)
- Shizukanaru Don (Tatsuo Nitta)
- Sarusuberi (Hinako Sugiura)
