= Magic Maker =

Japanese light novel series

- Magic Maker: How to Make Magic in Another World
- First light novel volume cover

マジック・メイカー ～異世界魔法の作り方～ (Majikku Meikā: Isekai Mahō no Tsukurikata)
- Genre: Isekai
- Novel series
- Written by: Kazuki Kaburagi
- Published by: Shōsetsuka ni Narō
- Original run: June 9, 2017 – present
- Light novel
- Written by: Kazuki Kaburagi
- Illustrated by: Kururi
- Published by: Media Factory
- English publisher: NA: Seven Seas Entertainment
- Imprint: MF Books
- Original run: May 25, 2020 – present
- Volumes: 3
- Manga
- Written by: Kazuki Kaburagi
- Illustrated by: Tomozo Nishioka
- Published by: Mag Garden
- English publisher: NA: Seven Seas Entertainment
- Imprint: Blade Comics
- Magazine: Manga Doa
- Original run: June 19, 2021 – February 4, 2023
- Volumes: 3
- Anime television series
- Directed by: Kazuomi Koga
- Written by: Keiichirō Ōchi
- Music by: Kei Yoshikawa; Kana Hashiguchi
- Studio: Studio Deen
- Licensed by: Crunchyroll
- Original network: TV Tokyo, TVO, BS NTV, AT-X
- English network: SEA: Animax Asia
- Original run: January 9, 2025 – March 27, 2025
- Episodes: 12

Magic Maker: How to Make Magic in Another World (マジック・メイカー ～異世界魔法の作り方～, Majikku Meikā: Isekai Mahō no Tsukurikata; "How to Perform Alternate World Magic") is a Japanese light novel series written by Kazuki Kaburagi and illustrated by Kururi. It began serialization online in June 2017 on the user-generated novel publishing website Shōsetsuka ni Narō. It was later acquired by Media Factory, who have published three volumes since May 2020 under their MF Books imprint. A manga adaptation with art by Tomozo Nishioka was serialized via the Manga Doa app from June 2021 to February 2023 and was collected in three tankōbon volumes by Mag Garden. An anime television series adaptation produced by Studio Deen aired from January to March 2025.

== Characters ==
Shion (シオン)
Voiced by: Megumi Han (Japanese); Rowan Gilvie (English)
Marie (マリー, Marī)
Voiced by: Ai Kakuma (Japanese); Hannah Alyea (English)
Rose (ローズ, Rōzu)
Voiced by: Sora Amamiya (Japanese); Amanda Gael (English)
Raphina (ラフィーナ, Rafīna)
Voiced by: Yū Serizawa (Japanese); Whitney Rodgers (English)
Brigitte (ブリジット, Burijitto)
Voiced by: Aoi Koga (Japanese); Rebecca Danae (English)
Cole (コール, Kōru)
Voiced by: Naoya Miyase (Japanese); Mark Allen Jr. (English)
Gawain (ガウェイン, Gawein)
Voiced by: Mitsuru Miyamoto (Japanese); Nick Huber (English)
Ema (エマ)
Voiced by: Megumi Toyoguchi (Japanese); Kirsty Johnson (English)
Grast (グラスト, Gurasuto)
Voiced by: Masayuki Akasaka (Japanese); Dalton Tindall (English)

== Media ==
=== Light novel ===
Written by Kazuki Kaburagi, Magic Maker: How to Make Magic in Another World began serialization online on the user-generated novel publishing website Shōsetsuka ni Narō on June 9, 2017. It was later acquired by Media Factory who began publishing it with illustrations by Kururi under their MF Books light novel imprint on May 25, 2020. Three volumes have been released as of December 2024.

In May 2025, Seven Seas Entertainment announced that they also licensed the light novels for English publication.

No.	Original release date	Original ISBN	English release date	English ISBN
1	May 25, 2020	978-4-04-064655-8	February 19, 2026 (Digital); March 17, 2026 (Physical)	979-8-89765-224-2
2	December 25, 2020	978-4-04-680072-5	May 14, 2026 (Digital); July 7, 2026 (Physical)	979-8-89765-225-9
3	December 25, 2024	978-4-04-683826-1	—	—

=== Manga ===
A manga adaptation illustrated by Tomozo Nishioka was serialized on the Manga Doa app from June 19, 2021 to February 4, 2023. The manga's chapters were collected by Mag Garden into three tankōbon volumes from December 2021 to February 2023.

In January 2025, Seven Seas Entertainment announced that they licensed the manga for English publication.

No.	Original release date	Original ISBN	English release date	English ISBN
1	December 9, 2021	978-4-8000-1153-4	September 9, 2025	979-8-89373-980-0
2	August 9, 2022	978-4-8000-1226-5	January 13, 2026	979-8-89373-981-7
3	February 9, 2023	978-4-8000-1297-5	May 5, 2026	979-8-89373-982-4

=== Anime ===
An anime television series adaptation was announced on July 10, 2024. it is produced by Studio Deen and directed by Kazuomi Koga, with Keiichirō Ōchi writing series scripts, Takayuki Noguchi designing the characters, and Kei Yoshikawa and Kana Hashiguchi composing the music. The series aired from January 9 to March 27, 2025, on TV Tokyo and other networks. (Note: TV Tokyo lists the series premiere on January 8, 2025, at 24:00, which is effectively January 9 at midnight JST.) The opening theme song is "Kirameki" (煌めき; Twinkle), performed by XIIX, while the ending theme song is "Yoake no Uta" (夜明けの歌; Song of Dawn), performed by Humbreaders. Crunchyroll streams the series.

==== Episodes ====
No.	Title	Directed by	Written by	Storyboarded by	Original release date
1	"Marie and Shion"; Transliteration: "Marī to Shion" (Japanese: マリーとシオン)	Masahiko Watanabe	Keiichirō Ōchi	Takashi Iida	January 9, 2025
Marie and her younger brother Shion were born into an aristocratic family in a rural area. Marie doted on Shion and always cared for him, to the point that there were many aspects of Shion that only Marie knew, such as when he played house alone or the mature expression he suddenly displayed. One night, when Shion was three years old, he experienced great disappointment during a conversation with his family. Three years had passed since that day and the word "magic" had never left his mouth again. One day, Marie witnessed a certain phenomenon and took Sion by the hand, leading him through the forest to a lake.
2	"There Is No Magic in This Other World"; Transliteration: "Kono Isekai ni wa Mahō ga nai" (Japanese: この異世界には魔法がない)	Shunji Yoshida	Keiichirō Ōchi	Kazuomi Koga	January 16, 2025
Shion's life of yearning for magic comes to an end and his second life begins. For him, the luminous phenomenon he witnessed at the lake with Marie and the others added great color to his everyday life. Shion has named this phenomenon, and the glow caused by strong emotions, the "demonic possession state", and as he becomes fascinated with it, he makes several discoveries. Shion wants to practice the "demonic gathering state" so that he can move on to the next step, so he takes on a joint sword fighting training session with Marie and Rose. There, Shion sees something true in Marie...
3	"Goblin Attack"; Transliteration: "Goburin Shūrai" (Japanese: ゴブリン襲来)	Takeshi Yoshimoto	Takahiro Nagase	Ryōji Fujiwara	January 23, 2025
Unlike what Shion knew from his previous life, in this world goblins appear near the village, beings that many people fear. While his father, Gawain, sets out to hunt goblins, the women who remained in the village, along with the children (including Shion), take refuge together in the mansion to protect themselves from any harm. Suddenly, the sound of a loud door slamming and a window breaking breaks the silence. The goblins invade the mansion and walk towards the room where Shion and the others are hiding.
4	"Magical Research Begins in Earnest"; Transliteration: "Mahō Kenkyū, Honkaku Shidō" (Japanese: 魔法研究、本格始動)	Naoki Hishikawa	Yasunori Yamada	Toshifumi Kawase	January 30, 2025
After a battle with a goblin, Shion's father recognize his interest in magic. With his help, Shion is excited to discover a new magic spell: "Flare." Unlike Shion, Marie's usual gentle and caring expression has disappeared. Marie wielded her sword with such concentration, as if trying to shake off some unpleasant memory, that her hands were covered in blisters making it difficult for her to hold the sword. In Marie's heart, there are images of goblins and Shion...
5	"Lightning Ore and Bolt"; Transliteration: "Raikōseki to Boruto" (Japanese: 雷鉱石とボルト)	Naoki Murata	Keiichirō Ōchi	Hiroyuki Fukushima	February 6, 2025
After confessing their feelings to each other, Shion and Marie no longer have any hard feelings for each other, but Marie's affection for Shion seems to have intensified. Shion is confused as Marie becomes increasingly dependent, when his father's friend Glast appears. They attempt to use Shion's knowledge to collect and sell lightning ore, but Glast's warehouse is filled to the brim with stone reserves. He asks Shion to think of a way to sell the lightning ore.
6	"Guild and Monster Suppression"; Transliteration: "Girudo to Mamono Tōbatsu" (Japanese: ギルドと魔物討伐)	Shunji Yoshida	Takahiro Nagase	Takashi Iida	February 13, 2025
One night, Shion's father, Gawain, says something that shakes his heart, but he continues to dedicate his days to studying magic. However, as his research on fire, lightning, and water magic reaches a standstill, he decides to reach a new level and start defeating monsters. Despite facing an unexpected situation, Shion, Marie, and Rose fight the kobolds. Shion uses magic while Marie and Rose use their swords to defeat the kobolds, but just when they think it's all over...
7	"Daily Life Begins to Break Down"; Transliteration: "Koware Yuku Nichijō" (Japanese: 壊れゆく日常)	Haruki Nekusu	Yasunori Yamada	Ryōji Fujiwara	February 20, 2025
It's been two years since Shion started hunting monsters. When he was 10 and Marie and Rose were 12, they decided one day to exterminate the pests in Rose's family's fields. The three of them spent their time together as usual, laughing as they responded to Marie's words, "I'll catch more next year." At that moment, a mysterious red light flashed through the rain clouds for a split second. Immediately afterward, Marie suddenly collapses behind Shion as if the thread had snapped. Noticing the strange noise, Shion turns pale and picks Marie up, but...
8	"I Will Do the Healing"; Transliteration: "Boku ga Naosu" (Japanese: 僕が治す)	Takeshi Yoshimoto	Keiichirō Ōchi	Kiyotaka Ōhata	February 27, 2025
Marie is diagnosed with lethargy and has become completely unresponsive to outside stimuli. Seeing this, Shion's body and mind weaken, but he remembers the words Marie once told him: "Help people with magic." He stands up and does what he can. At the same time Marie was defeated, an incident involving a mysterious monster known as Wraith occurred, resulting in many casualties. To deal with this, Theon and Gawain visit Duke Balfe.
9	"Lethargy Sickness ~Treatment and Research~"; Transliteration: "Taida-byō ~Chiryō to Kenkyū~" (Japanese: 怠惰病 ～治療と研究～)	Shigeki Awai	Takahiro Nagase	Ryōji Fujiwara	March 6, 2025
After accepting Marie's feelings, Shion, along with Cole, Rafina, and Bridget, set out to research a cure for the lethargy disease. Shion continues to search for a cure, using magic as a key clue. Meanwhile, Marie's friend Rose is also worried about her situation. Shion continues desperately searching for a cure. Wanting to help the two, Rose offers to use her own body to conduct magical research.
10	"The Night Menace Has Come"; Transliteration: "Kakuya ga Ki tari te" (Japanese: 赫夜が来たりて)	Kazuomi Koga	Yasunori Yamada	Ryōji Fujiwara	March 13, 2025 (Note: This episode aired at 12:10 a.m. JST, 10 minutes after the original air time on TV Tokyo.)
Two years pass and a red curtain flashes across the sky again, announcing the appearance of a large number of Specters. Shion, Rafina, and others fight against a horde of Specters approaching Istria. Likely due to Akatsuki's influence, their magical power is not depleted, and they are able to use magic to repel the Specters, but the swarm of Specters still remains in large numbers and attacks the group. Glast and a certain someone arrive before Shion and the others, who seem half-desperate.
11	"Sorcery and Magic"; Transliteration: "Majutsu to Mahō" (Japanese: 魔術と魔法)	Shunji Yoshida	Keiichirō Ōchi	Hiroyuki Fukushima	March 20, 2025
The situation changes dramatically with the appearance of Einzwelf, a man who calls himself a demon. With a single movement, he summons flames to explode everywhere, engulfing many soldiers. In a situation where fear and despair dominate, Shion gathers his courage and confronts Einzwelf, who possesses magical powers far greater than his own. Einzwelf, who called Shion "a member of the Lugger bloodline," confronts him and, seeing Shion's powers, calls it "magic."
12	"Who Am I Really?"; Transliteration: "Boku wa Nanimono Nan desu ka?" (Japanese: 僕は何者なんですか？)	Tarō Kubo	Keiichirō Ōchi	Toshifumi Kawase	March 27, 2025
Shion repels Einzwelf using the power of "magic" rather than sorcery. After a fierce battle, Shion slips into a week-long coma. When he awakens, he discovers a magical light overflowing from his body, illuminating him so brightly that he mistakes night for day. Having gained a tremendous amount of magical power, Shion goes to Marie, who is still slumbering, to test his hypothesis about the lethargy disease. Shion places his hand on Marie's chest and channels magic into her body, allowing her to finally wake. After returning home, Marie stays in rehabilitation to recover, determined to catch up with Shion in the royal capital.

== See also ==
- Easygoing Territory Defense by the Optimistic Lord, another light novel series with the same illustrator
- Isekai Izakaya "Nobu", another light novel series with the same illustrator
