= Nonoka Ōbuchi =

- 大渕 野々花
- Born: March 13, 2000 (age 26); Saitama Prefecture, Japan
- Occupations: Singer, actress, voice actress
- Years active: 2024–present
- Agent: e-stone music
- Musical career
- Years active: 2017–2018, 2024–present
- Label: FlyingDog
- Formerly of: Flowlight
- Website: e-stonemusic.com/nonoka

Nonoka Ōbuchi (大渕 野々花, Ōbuchi Nonoka; born March 13, 2000) is a Japanese singer, actress, and voice actress who is affiliated with e-stone music with a business partnership with Voice Kit. She initially began her entertainment activities as a child actress, before being a part of the dance and music unit Flowlight from 2017 to 2018. She made her debut as a solo artist in 2024 with the release of her single "Shuku Somete Shinzō", the title track being used as the ending theme to the anime television series Mysterious Disappearances. She is also active as an actress and voice actress, appearing in the stage play adaptation of Lycoris Recoil and the anime series I'm a Behemoth in 2025.

== Biography ==
Ōbuchi was born in Saitama Prefecture on March 13, 2000. At an early age, she had been interested in music, learning to play the piano at the age of four. When she was in elementary school, she started listening to Vocaloid, becoming a fan of the composer Neru since she was 11 years old. She also aimed to become a voice actress, writing "voice acting" during her elementary graduation essay. She initially began her entertainment activities as a child actress at the age of 10, appearing in stage shows, TV programs, and singing competitions such as TBS's Sing! Sing! Sing!.

In 2017, Ōbuchi became part of the three-member music unit Flowlight; she remained part of the group until December 2018. After leaving the group, she enrolled at the Tokyo Women's Christian University, where she studied literature. She was also a contestant at the university's Miss Campus Contest pageant in 2019. During her studies, she also worked as a student newscaster.

In 2022, Ōbuchi participated in InuCon, a talent audition held by Victor Entertainment's subsidiary FlyingDog. Ōbuchi won a special award, while the grand prize went to solo singer Rei Nakashima. She also participated in an audition for new members of the idol group Shiritsu Ebisu Chugaku, although she was ultimately not selected. In 2023, she portrayed Kurumi in the stage play adaptation of the anime series Lycoris Recoil.

Ōbuchi made her debut as a singer in 2024, releasing her first single "Shuku Somete Shinzō" (朱く染めて心臓; lit. "Scarlet-Dyed Heart"); the title track was used as the opening theme to the anime television series Mysterious Disappearances and was composed and written by Neru. She also debuted as a voice actress in the series, voicing the character Yuri Takanashi in episode 6.

In 2025, Ōbuchi voiced the character Lily in the anime television series I'm a Behemoth, an S-Ranked Monster, but Mistaken for a Cat, I Live as an Elf Girl's Pet; she also released her second single "Saijōkyū no Kokoro" (最上級の心; lit. "Supreme Heart"), the title track being used as the opening theme to I'm a Behemoth. In 2026, she voiced the character Lada Priora in the anime series Easygoing Territory Defense by the Optimistic Lord; she also performed the series' ending theme "Make It".

== Filmography ==
=== Anime ===
2024

- Mysterious Disappearances, Yuri Takanashi (episode 6)

2025

- I'm a Behemoth, an S-Ranked Monster, but Mistaken for a Cat, I Live as an Elf Girl's Pet, Lily

2026

- Easygoing Territory Defense by the Optimistic Lord, Lada Priora
- Dark Machine: The Animation, Denebora

== Discography ==
=== Singles ===
- "Shuku Somete Shinzō" (朱く染めて心臓; lit. "Scarlet-Dyed Heart") (May 22, 2024)
- "Saijōkyū no Kokoro" (最上級の心; lit. "Supreme Heart") (February 26, 2025)
- "Make It" (February 25, 2026)
