= Riho Sugiyama =

Japanese voice actress

- 杉山 里穂
- Born: December 31; Hokkaido, Japan
- Occupation: Voice actress
- Years active: 2013–present
- Agents: Yu-rin Pro (2013–2018); Mausu Promotion (2018–2026); Asleben (2026–present)
- Notable credits: Wave, Listen to Me! as Minare Koda; I've Been Killing Slimes for 300 Years and Maxed Out My Level as Rosalie; 86 as Henrietta Penrose; Reign of the Seven Spellblades as Pete Reston

Riho Sugiyama (杉山 里穂, Sugiyama Riho; born December 31) is a Japanese voice actress affiliated with Asleben.

== Biography ==
After graduating from high school, Sugiyama attended the Sapporo Manga, Anime, & Voice Actor Vocational School, where she trained to become a voice actor. She joined the talent agency Yu-rin Pro in 2013, and later moved to Mausu Promotion in 2018. Sugiyama joined the talent agency Asleben in June 2026.

Sugiyama starred in her first lead role as Tanis in the 2018 anime series Creatures Family Days. In 2020, she voiced Minare Koda in the anime series Wave, Listen to Me!, for which she was nominated for Best VA Performance (Japanese) at the 5th Crunchyroll Anime Awards. In 2021, Sugiyama was one of the recipients of the Best New Actress Award at the 15th Seiyu Awards.

== Filmography ==
=== Anime series ===
2017

- Kenka Bancho Otome: Girl Beats Boys as Tadashi Konparu
- Atom: The Beginning as Urara Suidobashi

2018

- Creatures Family Days as Tanis
- Kakuriyo: Bed and Breakfast for Spirits as Ranmaru (childhood)
- FLCL Progressive as Yuya
- Conception as Tarua
- Ulysses: Jeanne d'Arc and the Alchemist Knight as Miriam

2019

- My Roommate Is a Cat as Subaru (childhood)
- Boogiepop and Others as Shizuka Hashizaka
- JoJo's Bizarre Adventure: Golden Wind as Anita
- No Guns Life as Imelda

2020

- Aikatsu on Parade! as Kotomi Kojima
- Wave, Listen to Me! as Minare Koda
- Tsugu Tsugumomo as Arumi Ashimine
- Cardfight!! Vanguard Gaiden if as Masked Magician Harri
- Love Live! Nijigasaki High School Idol Club as Vice President

2021

- Cardfight!! Vanguard overDress as TV Announcer
- 86 as Henrietta Penrose
- I've Been Killing Slimes for 300 Years and Maxed Out My Level as Rosalie
- Tropical-Rouge! Pretty Cure as Izumi Komori
- Takt Op. Destiny as Jimmy
- The Vampire Dies in No Time as Shadow, Twink Hunters

2022

- Requiem of the Rose King as Buckingham (first cour)
- GaruGaku II: Lucky Stars as Chino Hamura
- On Air Dekinai! as Yori-chan
- 3 Seconds Later, He Turned Into a Beast as Tsumugi Kume (on-air version)
- Vermeil in Gold as Jessica Schwartz

2023

- Spy Classroom as Eve
- Farming Life in Another World as Ya
- Heavenly Delusion as Manaka Mikura, Nata
- Reign of the Seven Spellblades as Pete Reston
- The Idolmaster Million Live! as Sora Hayasaka
- 16bit Sensation: Another Layer as Yuki
- The Vexations of a Shut-In Vampire Princess as Flöte Mascarail
- Dr. Stone: New World as Hyoga (young)

2024

- Rinkai! as Kinusa Takamatsu
- Himitsu no AiPri as Spicy P
- Grendizer U as Yamada
- Sengoku Youko as Kikudomaru
- 2.5 Dimensional Seduction as Saito
- Tying the Knot with an Amagami Sister as Uryu Kamihate (young)
- Mechanical Arms as Yuan

2025

- Beheneko: The Elf-Girl's Cat Is Secretly an S-Ranked Monster! as Tama (cat)
- Solo Leveling: Arise from the Shadow as Esil Radiru
- Zenshu as Luke Braveheart (young)
- Necronomico and the Cosmic Horror Show as Miko Kurono
- New Saga as Miranda
- Backstabbed in a Backwater Dungeon as Mera

2026

- The Invisible Man and His Soon-to-Be Wife as Luna Jarashi
- Akane-banashi as Hiiragi
- Pardon the Intrusion, I'm Home! as Hazuki Takamine
- Petals of Reincarnation as S. Häyhä
- The Ghost in the Shell as Nurse Sue
- That Time I Got Reincarnated as a Slime as Takt
- My Stepmother and Stepsisters Aren't Wicked as Takiko Mizuse
- Overgeared as Jishuka
- My Girlfriend's Friend as Miyuki
- Psyren as Fubuki Yoshina
- Dark Machine: The Animation as Bran

=== Anime films ===
2021

- Sing a Bit of Harmony as Ryoko

2024

- Dead Dead Demon's Dededede Destruction as Sugimura, Chanmiyo, Katsuyo

=== Original video animation ===
2021

- Planetarian: Snow Globe as Mother

2024

- Code Geass: Rozé of the Recapture as Yōko Araki

=== Original net animation ===
2018

- Lost Song as Alond

2020

- Ghost in the Shell: SAC_2045 as Opeko
- Zetsumetsu Kigu-shun as Rakko-shun

2023

- Junji Ito Maniac: Japanese Tales of the Macabre as Kazuko Morinaka

=== Video games ===
2014

- Great Edo Blacksmith as Ranmaru

2015

- Yōkai Hyakkitan! as Kidōmaru, Makura-gaeshi

2016

- Uchi no Hime-sama ga Ichiban Kawaii as Hera
- Kansen × Shōjo as Hotaru Kirishima

2018

- Kuro no Kishidan: Knights Chronicle as Electra, Abel

2019

- Kamihime Kakusei Melty Maiden as Sara
- Conception Plus: Ore no Kodomo o Undekure! as Tarua
- Utawarerumono: Lost Flag as Unkei
- Pokémon Masters EX as Anzu/Janine

2020

- Saint Seiya: Rising Cosmo as Cassiopeia Bilda
- World Flipper as Nicola

2021

- Samurai Force: Shing! as Aiko
- Monster Hunter Rise as Monju

2022

- Star Melody: Yumemi Dreamer as Envy Rose
- Final Fantasy XIV as Azeyma
- Azur Lane as SMS Thüringen
- AI: The Somnium Files – Nirvana Initiative as Hanayo Nasu

2023

- Dragon Quest X as Linker
- Mario + Rabbids Sparks of Hope as Kanya
- Assassin's Creed Mirage as Nehal

2024

- Another Code: Recollection as Ashley Mizuki Robbins
- Bar Stella Abyss as Maia
- Final Fantasy VII Rebirth as Regina
- Unicorn Overlord as Amalia
- Guilty Gear Strive as A.B.A
- Witch & Lilies as Dolores, Hiiragi
- Solo Leveling: Arise as Esil Radiru
- Ash Echoes as Roar

2025

- The Hundred Line: Last Defense Academy as Szanshin
- Mobile Suit Gundam U.C. Engage as Lynette
- Guardian Tales as Callie
- Everybody's Golf Hot Shots as Lun
- Towa and the Guardians of the Sacred Tree as Mitoku
- Majogami as Aradia

2026

- Code Vein II as Lise Anjou
- Path to Nowhere as Clementine
- Anomalith as Yuiga Koda

=== Dubbing ===
- 28 Years Later as Spike (Alfie Williams)
- 28 Years Later: The Bone Temple as Spike (Alfie Williams)
- Erin & Aaron as Erin Park (Ava Ro)
- Extraordinary Attorney Woo as Dong Geu-ra-mi (Joo Hyun-young)
- Gabby's Dollhouse as MerCat (Secunda Wood)
- King Richard as Venus Williams (Saniyya Sidney)
- Last Night in Soho as Jocasta (Synnøve Karlsen)
- Mare of Easttown as Siobhan Sheehan (Angourie Rice)
- Mom and Dad as Carly Ryan (Anne Winters)
- Scream VI as Mindy Meeks-Martin (Jasmin Savoy Brown)
- Scream 7 as Mindy Meeks-Martin (Jasmin Savoy Brown)
- Till Death as Emma (Megan Fox)
- Uncharted as Zoe (Alana Boden)
