= Jitsugyō no Nihon =

Business magazine in Japan (1897–2002)

- Editor: Masuda Yoshikazu
- Categories: Business magazine
- Frequency: Fortnightly; Monthly
- Publisher: Dainihon Jitsugyo Gakkai; Jitsugyō no Nihon Sha, Ltd (From 1900)
- Founded: 1897
- First issue: 10 June 1897
- Final issue: March 2002
- Country: Japan
- Based in: Tokyo
- Language: Japanese

Jitsugyō no Nihon (実業の日本, Business Japan) was one of the first business magazines of Japan. The magazine was published monthly and was based in Tokyo. It was in circulation between June 1897 and March 2002.

== History and profile ==
Jitsugyō no Nihon was started in 1897. The first issue appeared on 10 June 1897. The founding publisher was Dainihon Jitsugyo Gakkai. Later it was published by a company with the same name, Jitsugyō no Nihon Sha, Ltd., which was founded by Masuda Yoshikazu in 1900. Masuda Yoshikazu was the founding editor, and Shibusawa Eiichi was among the regular contributors. The magazine was published on a fortnightly basis and later on a monthly basis The headquarters was in Tokyo.

Jitsugyō no Nihon covered articles about economy, finance and current affairs. It also offered information about business targeting people with no formal education on the subject. The magazine was one of the supporters of Japan's participating in World War II. Following the war it changed its focus becoming a trade magazine with a special reference to the stock market. Jitsugyō no Nihon ceased publication in 2002, and the final issue appeared in March 2002.
