= On Air Dekinai! =

Japanese manga series

- Cover of On Air Dekinai! volume by Asahi Shimbun Publishing

オンエアできない！ (On'ea Dekinai!)
- Manga
- Written by: Kana Mafune
- Published by: Asahi Shimbun Publishing
- Imprint: Sonorama+ Comics
- Published: October 20, 2017
- Volumes: 1
- Manga

On Air Dekinai! Deep
- Written by: Kana Mafune
- Published by: Asahi Shimbun Publishing
- Imprint: Sonorama+ Comics
- Magazine: Sonorama Plus
- Original run: January 8, 2019 – 2020
- Volumes: 1
- Anime television series
- Directed by: Jun Aoki
- Written by: Jun Aoki
- Music by: Junpei Yamada
- Studio: Jinnan Studio; Space Neko Company
- Original network: BS TV Tokyo, TV Tokyo, AT-X
- Original run: January 10, 2022 – March 28, 2022
- Episodes: 12

On Air Dekinai! (オンエアできない！, On'ea Dekinai!; "We Can't Go On Air!") is a Japanese manga series by Kana Mafune, who works for BS TV Tokyo. It was serialized in 2017 and collected in a single tankōbon volume by Asahi Shimbun Publishing in October of the same year. A sequel manga by Mafune titled On Air Dekinai! Deep (オンエアできない！ Deep, On'ea Dekinai! Deep; "We Can't Go On Air! Deep") was serialized online via Asahi Shimbun Publishing's Sonorama Plus website between January 2019 and 2020 and also collected in a single tankōbon volume in March 2020. An anime television series adaptation by Jinnan Studio and Space Neko Company aired from January to March 2022.

== Characters ==
Mafuneko (まふねこ)
Voiced by: Yō Taichi
Director Onigawara (鬼河原ディレクター)
Voiced by: Yasuhiro Mamiya
Yori-chan (よりちゃん)
Voiced by: Riho Sugiyama
Chief AD Yokoyama (横山チーフAD)
Voiced by: Yūya Hirose

== Media ==
=== Anime ===
On November 2, 2021, an anime television series adaptation was announced. The series is animated by Jinnan Studio and Space Neko Company, with Jun Aoki directing and writing the series, and Junpei Yamada composing the series' music at Warlock with cooperation by TV Tokyo Music, and Yuusuke Inada in charge of sound effects. It aired from January 10 to March 28, 2022, on BS TV Tokyo, TV Tokyo, and AT-X. Izuki Minato performed the series' ending theme song "Work out!".

==== Episode list ====
| No. | Title | Original release date |
|---|---|---|
| 1 | "AD is Hard"; Transliteration: "Ei Dī wa Tsurai yo" (Japanese: ADはつらいよ) | January 10, 2022 |
| 2 | "It's a Production Station! Everyone Gather"; Transliteration: "Seisaku-kyoku da yo! Zen'in Shūgō" (Japanese: 制作局だョ！全員集合) | January 17, 2022 |
| 3 | "Escape is Useful for TV"; Transliteration: "Nigeru wa Terebi no Yaku ni Tatsu" (Japanese: 逃げるはTVの役に立つ) | January 24, 2022 (Note: This episode aired at 1:35 a.m. JST, 30 minutes after the original air time on BS TV Tokyo.) |
| 4 | "Screaming Love, In the Center of Shibuya"; Transliteration: "Shibuya no Chūshin de, Ai o Sakebu" (Japanese: 渋谷の中心で、愛を叫ぶ) | January 31, 2022 |
| 5 | "Wearing Lunandez!"; Transliteration: "Chaku Runandesu!" (Japanese: 着ルナンデス！) | February 7, 2022 |
| 6 | "Hero Mafuneko and Insert Island"; Transliteration: "Yūsha Mafuneko to Insāto no Shima" (Japanese: 勇者マフネコとインサートの島) | February 14, 2022 |
| 7 | "Girl with a Haze"; Transliteration: "Moya o Kakeru Shōjo" (Japanese: 靄をかける少女) | February 21, 2022 |
| 8 | "What Joint Party is You Going?"; Transliteration: "Yū wa Nanishi ni Gōkon e?" (Japanese: Youは何しに合コンへ？) | February 28, 2022 |
| 9 | "The Tongue of God"; Transliteration: "Kami no Shita" (Japanese: 神の舌) | March 7, 2022 |
| 10 | "Hyper Hardboiled Director Report"; Transliteration: "Haipā Hādoboirudo Direkutā Ripōto" (Japanese: ハイパーハードボイルドディレクターリポート) | March 14, 2022 |
| 11 | "The First D! (Part 1)"; Transliteration: "Hajimete no Dī Kai! (Zenpen)" (Japanese: はじめてのDかい！（前編）) | March 21, 2022 |
| 12 | "The First D! (Part 2)"; Transliteration: "Hajimete no Dī Kai! (Kōhen)" (Japanese: はじめてのDかい！（後編）) | March 28, 2022 |
