= Nagasaki Culture Telecasting =

JOXI-DTV

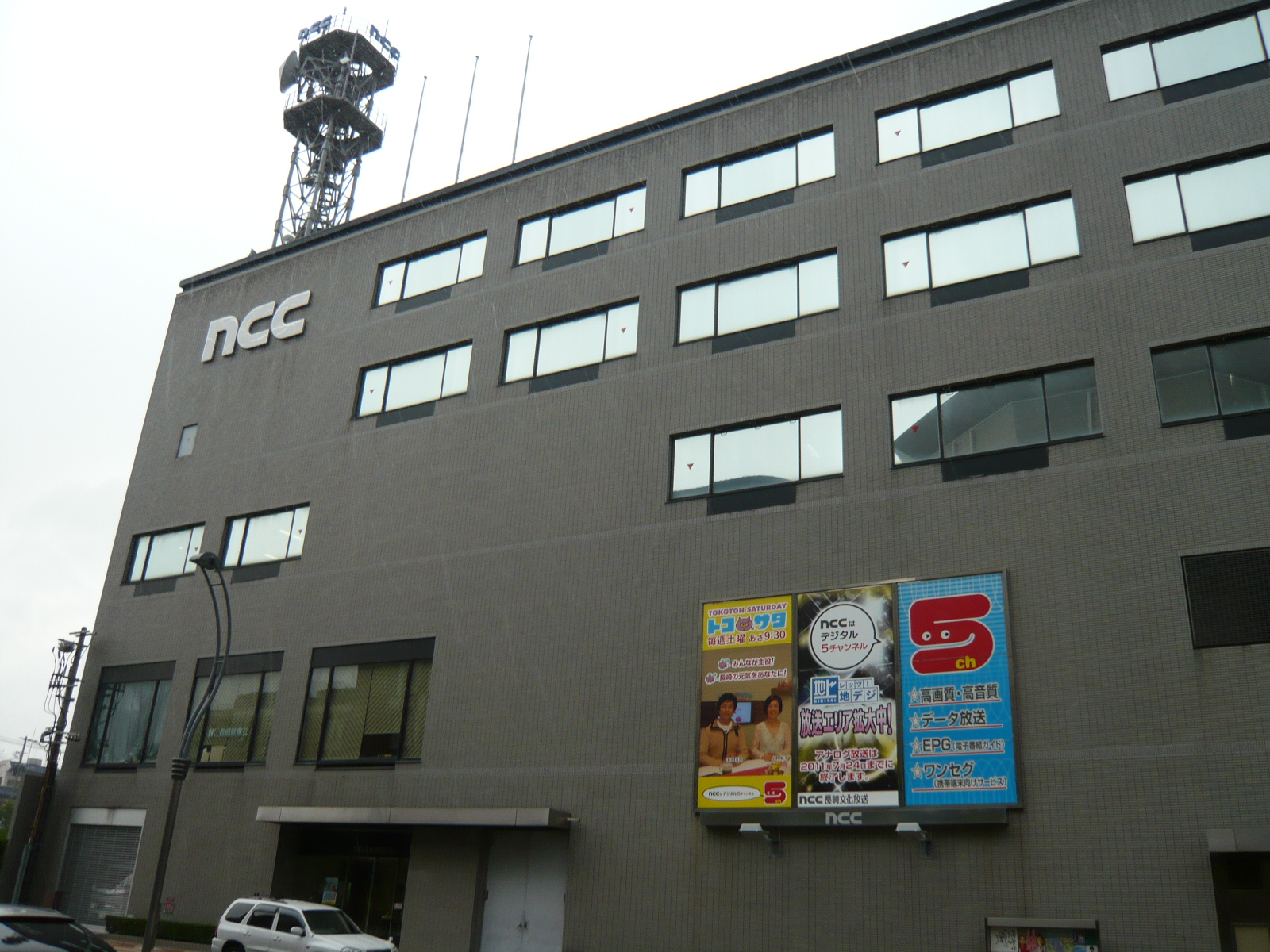
- Headquarters in Morimachi, Nagasaki
- Nagasaki Prefecture; Japan
- City: Nagasaki
- Channels: Digital: 19 (UHF); Virtual: 5
- Branding: ncc Nagasaki Culture Telecasting

Programming
- Affiliations: All-Nippon News Network

Ownership
- Owner: Nagasaki Culture Telecasting Corporation

History
- Founded: December 27, 1988
- First air date: April 1, 1990
- Former call signs: JOXI-TV (1990-2011)
- Former channel numbers: Analog: 27 (UHF, 1990-2011)

Technical information
- Licensing authority: MIC

Links
- Website: https://www.ncctv.co.jp/

Nagasaki Culture Telecasting (長崎文化放送, Nagasaki Bunka Hōsō), also known as NCC, is a television network headquartered in Nagasaki Prefecture, Japan. It is affiliated with All-Nippon News Network. TV Asahi Holdings and Asahi Shimbun are the main shareholders of NCC.

Nagasaki Culture Telecasting is the third commercial television station in Nagasaki prefecture. It was started broadcasting in 1990, and started digital terrestrial television broadcasting in December 2006. In 2020, NCC started to use its new master control room.
