= Jitsugyo no Nihon Sha =

Japanese publishing company

Jitsugyo no Nihon Sha, Ltd.
- Native name: 株式会社実業之日本社
- Romanized name: Kabushiki-gaisha Jitsugyō no Nihon Sha
- Type: Private KK
- Industry: Publishing
- Founded: June 10, 1897; 129 years ago
- Founder: Giichi Masuda
- Headquarters: Minami-Aoyama, Minato, Tokyo, Japan
- Products: Books; Manga; Magazines
- Website: j-n.co.jp

Jitsugyo no Nihon Sha, Ltd. (株式会社実業之日本社, Kabushiki-gaisha Jitsugyō no Nihon Sha; JNI) is a Japanese publishing company founded on June 10, 1897.

== Magazines ==
=== Monthly ===
- Body+
- Comic Candoll
- GarrRV
- Garuru
- Misty
- Monthly Bijutsu
- Monthly J-novel
- Waggle

=== Quarterly ===
- Kabuka Yohō
- NAIL VENUS

=== Defunct ===
- Jitsugyō no Nihon
- Fujin Sekai
- Nihon shōnen
- Shōjo no tomo
- Manga Sunday
- My Birthday

== Manga Imprints ==
- Mansun Comics
  - Mansun Q Comics
- MB Comics
- Jippi English Comics (bilingual Japanese-English)
  - Jungle Emperor Leo (Kimba the White Lion)
  - Mighty Atom (Astro Boy)
