= List of manga series by volume count =

This is a list of manga series by volume count of manga series that span at least 50 tankōbon volumes. There are 163 manga series from which 93 series are completed and 70 series are in ongoing serialization. Ongoing series are highlighted in light green.

== Series count ==
The list also notes the number of volumes and chapters, the author, the Japanese magazine in which it was originally serialized and its frequency, publisher and date of release of first and last (latest) volume of respective manga volume.

Sr. No.	Volumes	Chapters	Title	Author	Magazine (frequency) Publisher	First chapter (Note: The date for the first chapter of a series should generally be the date on the cover of the magazine issue it ran in.) First volume	Last chapter Last volume
1	223	759 (Note: Chapters published (both compiled and not compiled) as of volume 218.)	Golgo 13 (ゴルゴ13)	Takao Saito (1968–2021), Saito Production (2021–)	Big Comic (semimonthly); Shogakukan	October 1968; June 21, 1973	Ongoing
2	205 (Note: Dokaben consists of five named series. The first series, simply titled Dokaben, is collected in 48 volumes; the second series, Dai Kōshien (大甲子園), is collected in 26 volumes; the third series, Dokaben Professional Baseball (ドカベン プロ野球編), is collected in 52 volumes; the fourth series, Dokaben Superstars (ドカベン スーパースターズ編), is collected in 45 volumes; and the fifth series, Dokaben Dream Tournament (ドカベン ドリームトーナメント編), is collected in 34 volumes.)	1,767	Dokaben (ドカベン)	Shinji Mizushima	Weekly Shōnen Champion (weekly); Akita Shoten	April 24, 1972; October 21, 1972	June 28, 2018; September 7, 2018
3	203	1,990	KochiKame: Tokyo Beat Cops (こちら葛飾区亀有公園前派出所)	Osamu Akimoto	Weekly Shōnen Jump (weekly); Shueisha	September 21, 1976; July 9, 1977	September 17, 2016; October 2, 2026
4	188	1,691	Minami no Teiō (ミナミの帝王)	Dai Tennōji, Rikiya Gō	Weekly Manga Goraku (weekly); Nihon Bungeisha	January 1992; March 16, 1992	February 13, 2026; April 9, 2026
5	179	1,747 (Note: Chapters as of volume 179.)	Cooking Papa (クッキングパパ)	Tochi Ueyama	Morning (weekly); Kodansha	June 6, 1985; January 18, 1986	Ongoing
6	160 (Note: Ginga consists of six series. The original Silver Fang (銀牙 -流れ星 銀-) is collected in 18 volumes with 164 chapters; Its sequel, Weed is collected in 60 volumes with 500 chapters; its second sequel, Ginga Legend Weed: Orion (銀牙伝説WEEDオリオン), is collected in 30 volumes with 239 chapters; its third sequel, Ginga: The Last Wars (銀牙〜THE LAST WARS〜), is collected in 22 volumes with 176 chapters; Its fourth sequel, Ginga Legend: Noah (銀牙伝説ノア) is collected in 17 volumes with 136 chapters; Its fifth sequel, Ginga Legend: Requiem (銀牙伝説レクイエム) is ongoing with 104 chapters collected in 13 volumes as of December 2026.)	1,319	Silver Fang (銀牙 -流れ星 銀-)	Yoshihiro Takahashi	Weekly Shōnen Jump; Shueisha; Weekly Manga Goraku (weekly); Nihon Bungeisha	November 28, 1983; July 1, 1984	Ongoing
7	156 (Note: Grappler Baki consists of six series. The original Grappler Baki contains 42 volumes covering 371 chapters; Baki (バキ) contains 31 volumes covering 276 chapters; Baki Hanma (範馬刃牙) is collected into 37 volumes covering 312 chapters, Baki-Dou (刃牙道) is collected into 22 volumes covering 198 chapters, Baki Dou (バキ道) is collected into 17 volumes covering 151 chapters, and Baki Rahen (刃牙らへん) is collected into 7 volumes covering 63 chapters and still ongoing.)	1,378 (Note: Chapters as of volume 156.)	Grappler Baki (グラップラー刃牙)	Keisuke Itagaki	Weekly Shōnen Champion (weekly); Akita Shoten	October 10, 1991; February 21, 1992	Ongoing
8	151 (Note: Kinnikuman consists of two series. The original Kinnikuman manga is collected in 94 volumes and is currently ongoing; its second series, Kinnikuman Nisei (キン肉マンII世), is collected in 57 volumes.)	1,532 (Note: Chapters as of volume 94 of Kinnikuman and volume 57 of Kinnikuman Nisei.)	Kinnikuman (キン肉マン)	Yudetamago	Weekly Shōnen Jump, Weekly Playboy (weekly); Shueisha	May 15, 1979; February 15, 1980	Ongoing
9	145	1,506 (Note: Chapters as of volume 145.)	Hajime no Ippo (はじめの一歩)	George Morikawa	Weekly Shōnen Magazine (weekly); Kodansha	October 11, 1989; February 17, 1990	Ongoing
10	140 (Note: JoJo's Bizarre Adventure consists of nine shorter story arcs. Phantom Blood (ファントムブラッド) contains the first 47 chapters collected into 5 volumes, the second arc Battle Tendency (戦闘潮流) contains 67 chapters collected into 7 volumes, the third arc Stardust Crusaders (スターダストクルセイダース) contains 141 chapters collected into 16 volumes, the fourth arc Diamond Is Unbreakable (ダイヤモンドは砕けない) contains 180 chapters collected into 18 volumes, the fifth arc Golden Wind (黄金の風) contains 157 chapters collected into 17 volumes, the sixth arc Stone Ocean (ストーンオーシャン) contains 158 chapters collected into 17 volumes, the seventh arc Steel Ball Run (スティール・ボール・ラン) contains 95 chapters collected into 24 volumes, the eighth arc JoJolion (ジョジョリオン) contains 110 chapters collected into 27 volumes, and the ninth arc The JoJoLands contains 36 chapters collected into 9 volumes and still ongoing.)	993 (Note: Chapters as of volume 140.)	JoJo's Bizarre Adventure (ジョジョの奇妙な冒険)	Hirohiko Araki	Weekly Shōnen Jump (weekly); Ultra Jump (monthly); Shueisha	January 1, 1987; August 10, 1987	Ongoing
11	135	1,355 (Note: Chapters as of volume 135.)	Edomae no Sushi (江戸前の旬)	Shin Tsukumo, Terushi Satō	Weekly Manga Goraku (weekly); Nihon Bungeisha	March 1999; February 1, 2000	Ongoing
12	128	387 (Note: Chapters as of volume 128.)	Onihei Hankachō (鬼平犯科帳)	Takao Saito (1993–2021), Saito Production (2021–)	Comic Ran (monthly); LEED Publishing, Bungeishunjū	January 1993; January 19, 1994	Ongoing
13	122 (Note: Kobo, the Li'l Rascal was published for 60 volumes by Soyosha and is currently being published by Houbunsha at a total of 62 volumes as New Kobo, the Li'l Rascal.)		Kobo, the Li'l Rascal (コボちゃん)	Masashi Ueda	Yomiuri Shimbun (daily); Soyosha, Houbunsha	April 1, 1982; December 1, 1982	Ongoing
14	119	1,122 (Note: Chapters as of volume 119.)	Tsuribaka Nisshi (釣りバカ日誌)	Jūzō Yamasaki, Kenichi Kitami	Big Comic Original (semimonthly); Shogakukan	June 15, 1979; July 29, 1980	Ongoing
15	119 (Note: Hakuryuu consists of three series. The original Hakuryuu manga is collected in 21 volumes; the second series, Hakuryuu Legend (白竜LEGEND), is collected in 48 volumes (46 regular volumes and 2 Genshiryoku Mafia-hen volumes); the third series, Hakuryuu Hadou (白竜HADOU), is ongoing with 50 volumes.)	1,036 (Note: Chapters as of volume 119.)	Hakuryuu (白竜)	Dai Tennōji, Michio Watanabe	Manga Goraku Nexter (semimonthly); Weekly Manga Goraku (weekly); Nihon Bungeisha	September 27, 1996; June 1, 1997	Ongoing
16	118 (Note: Shizukanaru Don – Yakuza Side Story consists of two series. The original, Shizukanaru Don: Yakuza Side Story (静かなるドン) is collected in 108 volumes. Its sequel, Shizukanaru Don: Mou Hitotsu no Saishuushou (静かなるドン-もうひとつの最終章-最終章) is ongoing at 10 volumes.)	1,254	Shizukanaru Don – Yakuza Side Story (静かなるドン)	Tatsuo Nitta	Manga Sunday (weekly); Jitsugyo no Nihon Sha; Grand Jump (semimonthly); Shueisha	November 15, 1988; April 6, 1989	Ongoing
17	118 (Note: Tough consists of four series. The first series, Kōkō Tekkenden Tough is collected in 42 volumes; the second series, Tough, is collected in 39 volumes; the third series, Tough: Ryuu wo Tsugu Otoko is collected in 35 volumes and the fourth series, Tough - Dainishou is ongoing and collected in 2 volumes.)	1,344 (Note: Chapters as of volume 118.)	Tough (高校鉄拳伝タフ)	Tetsuya Saruwatari	Weekly Young Jump, Weekly Playboy (weekly); Shueisha	July 22, 1993; March 18, 1994	Ongoing
18	118	1,159 (Note: Chapters as of volume 118.)	Tenpai (天牌)	Tomoshi Kuga, Nobuaki Minegishi	Weekly Manga Goraku (weekly); Nihon Bungeisha	May 14, 1999; October 1, 1999	Ongoing
19	118	1,124 (Note: Chapters as of volume 118.)	Kowashiya Gen (解体屋ゲン)	Hoshino Hideki, Sadayoshi Ishii	Weekly Manga Times (weekly); Houbunsha	January 10, 2003; July 7, 2003	Ongoing
20	116	1,190 (Note: Chapters as of volume 116.)	One Piece (ワンピース)	Eiichiro Oda	Weekly Shōnen Jump (weekly); Shueisha	July 22, 1997; December 24, 1997	Ongoing
21	112 (Note: Major consists of two series. The original, Major (メジャー) is collected in 78 volumes. Its sequel, Major 2nd (メジャーセカンド) is ongoing at 34 volumes.)	1,078 (Note: Chapters as of volume 112.)	Major (メジャー)	Takuya Mitsuda	Weekly Shōnen Sunday (weekly); Shogakukan	August 3, 1994; January 13, 1995	Ongoing
22	112	1,039	Haguregumo (浮浪雲)	George Akiyama	Big Comic Original (semimonthly); Shogakukan	December 5, 1973; June 6, 1975	September 20, 2017; January 30, 2018
23	111	1,039	Oishinbo (美味しんぼ)	Tetsu Kariya, Akira Hanasaki	Big Comic Spirits (weekly); Shogakukan	October 15, 1983; November 30, 1984	May 12, 2014; December 10, 2014
24	110 (Note: Super Radical Gag Family consists of five series which includes the original Super Radical Gag Family with 31 volumes, 28 volumes of the Ganzo! Urayasu Tekkin Kazoku (元祖!浦安鉄筋家族), 24 volumes of the Maido! Urayasu Tekkin Kazoku (毎度!浦安鉄筋家族), 24 volumes of the Appare! Urayasu Tekkin Kazoku (あっぱれ!浦安鉄筋家族) and 3 volumes of the Moretsu! Urayasu Tekkin Kazoku (モーレツ!浦安鉄筋家族) which is currently ongoing.)	1,640 (Note: Chapters as of volume 110.)	Super Radical Gag Family (浦安鉄筋家族)	Kenji Hamaoka	Weekly Shōnen Champion (weekly); Akita Shoten	January 28, 1993; June 1, 1993	Ongoing
25	110	1,254	Nijitte Monogatari (弐十手物語)	Kazuo Koike, Satomi Kōe	Weekly Post (weekly); Shogakukan	March 13, 1978; April 27, 1981	November 3, 2003; February 28, 2005
26	110 (Note: The Captain Tsubasa series includes the original 37 volume manga, the 18 volume Captain Tsubasa: World Youth Saga (キャプテン翼 ワールドユース編) manga, the 15 volume Captain Tsubasa: Road to 2002 (キャプテン翼 ROAD TO 2002) manga, the 12 volume Captain Tsubasa: Golden-23 (キャプテン翼 GOLDEN-23) manga, the 2 volume covering 24 chapters Captain Tsubasa: Kaigai Gekito Hen in Calcio (キャプテン翼 海外激闘編 IN CALCIO) manga, the 6 volume Captain Tsubasa: Kaigai Gekito Hen En La Liga (キャプテン翼 海外激闘編 EN LA LIGA) manga and the 20 volume Captain Tsubasa: Rising Sun (キャプテン翼 ライジングサン) manga.)	1,026	Captain Tsubasa (キャプテン翼)	Yōichi Takahashi	Weekly Shōnen Jump, Weekly Young Jump (weekly); Grand Jump (semimonthly); Shueisha	March 31, 1981; January 9, 1982	April 4, 2024; June 4, 2024
27	109	1,169 (Note: Chapters as of volume 109.)	Case Closed (名探偵コナン)	Gosho Aoyama	Weekly Shōnen Sunday (weekly); Shogakukan	January 5, 1994; June 18, 1994	Ongoing
28	107 (Note: Super Doctor K consists of three series which includes the original Super Doctor K with 44 collected volumes, its sequel Doctor K with 10 collected volumes and its second sequel K2 which is currently ongoing with 53 volumes.)	1,008 (Note: Chapters as of volume 107.)	Super Doctor K (スーパードクターK)	Kazuo Mafune	Weekly Shōnen Magazine (weekly), Evening (semimonthly); Kodansha	April 6, 1988; August 17, 1988	Ongoing
29	107	976	Abu-san (あぶさん)	Shinji Mizushima	Big Comic Original (semimonthly); Shogakukan	February 20, 1973; May 15, 1974	February 5, 2014; March 28, 2014
30	106 (Note: Senri no Michi mo series consists of four series. The original Senri no Michi mo (千里の道も) manga is collected in 45 volumes. its sequel, Shin Senri no Michi mo manga is collected in 16 volumes, its second sequel, Senri no Michi mo Daisanshou (千里の道も第三章), is collected in 39 volumes, its third sequel, Senri no Michi mo: Shura no Michi Hen (千里の道も 修羅の道編), is collected in 6 volumes.)	1,187	Senri no Michi mo (千里の道も)	Ippo Ōhara, Satoshi Watanabe	Weekly Golf Digest (weekly); Golf Digest Sha	January 3, 1989; May 1, 1991	July 28, 2014; October 1, 2014
31	105 (Note: Higanjima consists of three series. The original Higanjima manga is collected in 33 volumes, its first sequel, Higanjima: Saigo no 47 Hiai (彼岸島 最後の47日間), is collected in 16 volumes, and its second sequel, Higanjima 48-nichi-go... (彼岸島 48日後...), is ongoing with 56 volumes.)	988	Higanjima (彼岸島)	Kōji Matsumoto	Weekly Young Magazine (weekly); Kodansha	November 2, 2002; April 4, 2003	Ongoing
32	104	655	Patalliro! (パタリロ!)	Mineo Maya	Hana to Yume (semimonthly), Bessatsu Hana to Yume (monthly); Hakusensha	November 20, 1978; October 20, 1979	Ongoing
33	103 (Note: Kindaichi Case File consists of nine series. The first series, the File series (FILEシリーズ), is collected in 27 volumes; the second series, Case series (Caseシリーズ), is collected in 10 volumes; the third series, Short File series (Short Fileシリーズ), is collected in 6 volumes; the fourth series, New series (新シリーズ), is collected in 14 volumes; the fifth series, 20th Anniversary series (20周年記念シリーズ), is collected in 5 volumes; the sixth series, Kindaichi Case Files R (金田一少年の事件簿R) is collected in 14 volumes; the seventh series, 37 Year Old Kindaichi Case Files (金田一37歳の事件簿) is collected in 18 volumes; the eighth series, Kindaichi Case Files 30th (金田一少年の事件簿30th) is collected in 4 volumes and the ninth series, Kindaichi Papa no Jikenbo (金田一パパの事件簿) is ongoing and collected in 5 volumes.)	815 (Note: Chapters as of volume 103.)	The Kindaichi Case Files (金田一少年の事件簿)	Yōzaburō Kanari, Seimaru Amagi, Fumiya Satō	Weekly Shōnen Magazine (weekly), Evening (semimonthly); Kodansha	October 14, 1992; February 17, 1993	Ongoing
34	103	873 (Note: Chapters as of volume 103.)	Yowamushi Pedal (弱虫ペダル)	Wataru Watanabe	Weekly Shōnen Champion (weekly); Akita Shoten	February 21, 2008; July 8, 2008	Ongoing
35	102 (Note: Dear Boys consists of six series. The original Dear Boys manga is collected in 23 volumes; the second, Dear Boys: The Early Days, is collected in one volume; the third, Dear Boys: Act II, is collected in 30 volumes; the fourth, Dear Boys: Act 3, is collected in 21 volumes; the fifth series, Dear Boys: Over Time, is collected in 3 volumes; and the sixth series, Dear Boys: Act 4, is currently ongoing and collected in 24 volumes.)	423 (Note: Chapters as of volume 102.)	Dear Boys (ディアボーイズ)	Hiroki Yagami	Monthly Shōnen Magazine (monthly); Kodansha	June 6, 1989; December 16, 1989	Ongoing
36	102	1,020	Myougatani Namidazaka Shinryoujo (なみだ坂診療所)	Jun Ujitani, Kougo Tsuguo	Weekly Manga Times (weekly); Houbunsha	November 17, 2000; May 1, 2001	April 9, 2021; February 2, 2023
37	100 (Note: Uramiya Honpo consists of seven series. The first series, Uramiya Honpo (怨み屋本舗), is collected in 20 volumes. The second series, Uramiya Honpo - Sukuruma Fuusuke (怨み屋本舗巣来間風介), is collected in 6 volumes. The third series, Uramiya Honpo - Reboot (怨み屋本舗REBOOT), is collected in 13 volumes. The fourth series, Uramiya Honpo - Revenge (怨み屋本舗 REVENGE), is collected 11 volumes. The fifth series, Uramiya Honpo - Evil Heart (怨み屋本舗 EVIL HEART), is collected in 9 volumes. The sixth series, Uramiya Honpo - Worst (怨み屋本舗WORST), is collected in 21 volumes. The seventh series, Uramiya Honpo - Diablo (怨み屋本舗DIABLO) is ongoing with 16 volumes. The spin-off series, Uramiya Honpo - Stream (怨み屋本舗 STREAM), which is also counted by Shueisha, is also ongoing with 4 volumes.)	668 (Note: Chapters as of volume 100.)	Uramiya Honpo (怨み屋本舗)	Shoushou Kurihara	Business Jump, Grand Jump (semimonthly); Shueisha	March 27, 2000; November 19, 2001	Ongoing
38	100	1,738	Asari-chan (あさりちゃん)	Mayumi Muroyama	Various Kodomo Magazines; Shogakukan	July 1, 1978; April 26, 1980	February 1, 2014; February 28, 2014
39	100	392	Inochi no Utsuwa (いのちの器)	Kimiko Uehara	For Mrs. (monthly); Akita Shoten	October 1991; September 22, 1994	March 3, 2026; April 16, 2026
40	98	967 (Note: Chapters as of volume 98.)	Mogura no Uta (土竜の唄)	Noboru Takahashi	Weekly Young Sunday, Big Comic Spirits (weekly); Shogakukan	August 18, 2005; January 5, 2006	Ongoing
41	97 (Note: Seito Shokun! consists of four series. The first series, Seito Shokun!, is collected in 24 volumes; the second series, Seito Shokun! Kyoshi-hen (生徒諸君!教師編), is collected in 25 volumes; the third series, Seito Shokun! Sai Shūshō: Tabidachi (生徒諸君! 最終章・旅立ち), is collected in 30 volumes and the fourth series "Seito Shokun! Kids" (生徒諸君! Kids), is ongoing and collected in 18 volumes as of October 2026.)	542 (Note: Chapters as of volume 97.)	Seito Shokun! (生徒諸君!)	Yoko Shoji	Shōjo Friend, Be Love (monthly); Kodansha	September 20, 1977; February 15, 1978	Ongoing
42	96	922 (Note: Chapters as of volume 96.)	Futari Ecchi (ふたりエッチ)	Katsu Aki	Young Animal (semimonthly); Hakusensha	December 27, 1996; August 29, 1997	Ongoing
43	94 (Note: Kōtarō Makaritōru! consists of three series. The first series Kōtarō Makaritōru! is collected in 59 tankōbon volumes, the second series Shin Kōtarō Makaritōru! (新・コータローまかりとおる!) is collected in 27 tankōbon volumes and the third series Kōtarō Makaritōru! L (コータローまかりとおる! L) is collected in 8 tankōbon volumes.)	464	Kōtarō Makaritōru! (コータローまかりとおる!)	Tatsuya Hiruta	Weekly Shōnen Magazine (weekly); Magazine Special (monthly); Kodansha	August 25, 1982; January 20, 1983	July 20, 2004; October 15, 2004
44	93 (Note: Kosaku Shima consists of nine series. The first series, Kachō Kōsaku Shima is collected in 17 volumes; the second series, Buchō Kōsaku Shima (部長島耕作), is collected in 13 volumes; the third series, Torishimariyaku Kōsaku Shima (取締役島耕作), is collected in 8 volumes; the fourth series, Jōmu Kōsaku Shima (常務島耕作), is collected in 6 volumes; the fifth series, Senmu Kōsaku Shima (専務島耕作), is collected in 5 volumes; the sixth series, Shachō Kōsaku Shima (社長島耕作), is collected in 16 volumes; the seventh series, Kaichō Kōsaku Shima (会長島耕作), is collected in 13 volumes; the eighth series, Sōdanyaku Shima Kōsaku (相談役島耕作) is collected in 6 volumes and the ninth series, Shagai Torishimariyaku Shima Kosaku (社外取締役 島耕作) is ongoing with 9 volumes.)	1,039 (Note: Chapters as of volume 93.)	Kosaku Shima (課長島耕作)	Kenshi Hirokane	Morning (weekly); Kodansha	February 24, 1983; June 14, 1985	Ongoing
45	93 (Note: Kabachitare! consists of three series which includes the original Kabachitare! compiled into 20 volumes, 34 volumes of Tokujou Kabachi!! - Kabachitare! 2 (特上カバチ!!-カバチタレ!2-) and 39 volumes of Kabachi!!! - Kabachitare! 3 (カバチ!!!-カバチタレ!3-).)	974	Kabachitare! (カバチタレ!)	Takashi Tajima, Takahiro Kochi	Morning (weekly); Kodansha	May 6, 1999; November 11, 1999	September 16, 2021; December 23, 2021
46	91 (Note: Kaiji consists of six series. The first series, Tobaku Mokushiroku Kaiji (賭博黙示録カイジ), is collected in 13 volumes. The second series, Tobaku Hakairoku Kaiji (賭博破戒録カイジ), is collected in 13 volumes. The third series, Tobaku Datenroku Kaiji (賭博堕天録カイジ), is collected in 13 volumes. The fourth series, Tobaku Datenroku Kaiji: Kazuya-hen (賭博堕天録カイジ 和也編), is collected 10 volumes. The fifth series, Tobaku Datenroku Kaiji: One Poker-hen (賭博堕天録カイジ ワン・ポーカー編), is collected in 16 volumes. The sixth series, Tobaku Datenroku Kaiji: 24 Oku Dasshutsu-hen (賭博堕天録カイジ 24億脱出編) is ongoing and collected in 26 volumes.)	881 (Note: Chapters as of volume 91.)	Kaiji (カイジ)	Nobuyuki Fukumoto	Weekly Young Magazine (weekly); Kodansha	February 19, 1996; September 6, 1996	Ongoing
47	90 (Note: Duel Masters consists of nine series. The original Duel Masters is collected in 17 volumes; its second series, Duel Masters Fighting Edge (デュエル・マスターズ FE), is collected in 12 volumes; its third series, Duel Masters Star Xross (デュエル・マスターズ SX) is collected in 9 volumes; its fourth series, Duel Masters Victory (デュエル・マスターズビクトリー) is collected in 10 volumes; its fifth series, Duel Masters Versus (デュエル・マスターズ VS) is collected in 12 volumes; its sixth series, Duel Masters (2017) (デュエル・マスターズ (2017)) is collected in 11 volumes; its seventh series, Duel Masters King (デュエル・マスターズ・キング) is collected in 8 volumes; its eighth series, Duel Masters Win (デュエル・マスターズ WIN (ウィン)), is collected in 10 volumes and the ninth series, Duel Masters RX (デュエル・マスターズ RX), is ongoing and currently collected in 1 volume.)	470 (Note: Chapters as of volume 90.)	Duel Masters (デュエル・マスターズ)	Shigenobu Matsumoto	CoroCoro Comic (monthly); Shogakukan	April 1999; December 1, 1999	Ongoing
48	90 (Note: The Prince of Tennis series consists of two series. The original, Tenisu no Oujisama (テニスの王子様), is collected in 42 volumes. The sequel, Shin Tenisu no Oujisama (新テニスの王子様), is collected in 48 volumes.)	856	The Prince of Tennis (テニスの王子様)	Takeshi Konomi	Weekly Shōnen Jump (weekly), Jump Square (monthly); Shueisha	July 6, 1999; January 7, 2000	August 4, 2026; September 4, 2026
49	89 (Note: Aji Ichi Monme consists of six series. The original Aji Ichi Monme is collected in 33 volumes, its second series, Shin Aji Ichi Monme (新・味いちもんめ), is collected in 21 volumes; and the third series, Aji Ichi Monme - Dokuritsu Hen (味いちもんめ 独立編) is collected in 10 volumes. Fourth series, Aji Ichi Monme: Nippon Shokukikou (味いちもんめ にっぽん食紀行), is collected in 6 volumes. Fifth series, Aji Ichi Monme: Sekai no Naka no Washoku-hen (味いちもんめ 世界の中の和食編), is collected in 2 volumes. The latest, sixth series, Aji Ichi Monme: Tsugi Aji (味いちもんめ 継ぎ味) is currently ongoing with 17 collected volumes.)	851 (Note: Chapters as of volume 89.)	Aji Ichi Monme (味いちもんめ)	Zenta Abe; Yoshimi Kurata	Big Comic Original Zōkan, Big Comic Superior (semimonthly); Shogakukan	October 15, 1984; May 30, 1986	Ongoing
50	88 (Note: Shonan Junai Gumi series consists of four series. The original, Shōnan Jun'ai Gumi! (湘南純愛組!), is collected in 31 volumes with 267 chapters. The first sequel, GTO, is collected in 25 volumes with 200 chapters. The second sequel, GTO: 14 Days in Shonan (GTO SHONAN 14DAYS), is collected in 9 volumes with 70 chapters. The third sequel, GTO: Paradise Lost (GTO パラダイス・ロスト, GTO Paradaisu Rosuto), is collected in 23 volumes with 191 chapters.)	728 (Note: GTO: Paradise Lost initially had its serialization discontinued with 20 released volumes and 165 chapters compiled; later it got its serialization resumed under the renamed title of GTO: Paradise Lost Kai, where it got fully republished and collected in 23 volumes and 191 chapters total.)	Shonan Junai Gumi (湘南純愛組!)	Tooru Fujisawa	Weekly Shōnen Magazine, Weekly Young Magazine (weekly); Kodansha	October 10, 1990; March 14, 1991	October 15, 2024; June 19, 2026
51	85 (Note: Q.E.D. consists of three series. The original Q.E.D. manga is collected in 50 volumes, its sequel, Q.E.D. iff - proven end - (Q.E.D. iff－証明終了－), is collected in 30 volumes, and its second sequel, Q.E.D. UNIV. (Q.E.D. UNIV ―証明終—) is collected in 5 volumes and still ongoing.)	169	Q.E.D. (Q.E.D. 証明終了)	Motohiro Katou	Monthly Shōnen Magazine+, Shōnen Magazine R, Getsumaga Kichi (monthly); Kodansha	June 20, 1997; December 16, 1998	Ongoing
52	85	851	Impact (インパクト)	Nobuhiro Sakata, Ryouji Ryuuzaki	Par Golf (weekly); Gakken	2002; February 1, 2002	2019; July 9, 2019
53	84 (Note: Ironfist Chinmi is divided into three series which includes 35 volumes of Tekken Chinmi (鉄拳チンミ), 20 volumes of the Shin Tekken Chinmi (新鉄拳チンミ) and 29 volumes of the Tekken Chinmi: Legends (鉄拳チンミLegends) which is still ongoing.)	402 (Note: Chapters as of volume 84.)	Ironfist Chinmi (鉄拳チンミ)	Takeshi Maekawa	Monthly Shōnen Magazine (monthly); Kodansha	December 1983; February 1987	Ongoing
54	84		G・DEFEND (ジー・ディフェンド)	Shuu Morimoto	Racish, Ichiraci (monthly); Tosuisha	February 1993; May 1993	Ongoing
55	84	759	Kaze no Daichi (風の大地)	Nobuhiro Sakata, Eiji Kazama	Big Comic Original (semimonthly); Shogakukan	August 1990; March 30, 1991	August 30, 2022; December 5, 2022
56	84 (Note: Yuushun no Mon consists of seven series. The first series, Yuushun no Mon (優駿の門), is collected in 33 volumes; The second series, Yuushun no Mon GI (優駿の門GI), is collected in 13 volumes; The third series, Yuushun no Mon: Pieta (優駿の門 -ピエタ-), is collected in 11 volumes; The fourth series, Yuushun no Mon: Champ (優駿の門 -チャンプ-), is collected 8 volumes; The fifth series, Yuushun no Mon: GP (優駿の門 GP), is collected in 5 volumes; The sixth series, Yuushun no Mon: 2020 Bajutsu (優駿の門 2020馬術), is collected in 8 volumes; The seventh series, Yuushun no Mon Munk (優駿の門 ムンク) is collected in 6 volumes.)	771	Yuushun no Mon (優駿の門)	Hiromi Yamasaki	Weekly Shōnen Champion, Play Comic, Champion Cross (weekly); Akita Shoten	December 16, 1994; May 1, 1995	February 2024; May 20, 2024
57	81	729 (Note: Chapters as of volume 81.)	Tasogare Ryūseigun (黄昏流星群)	Kenshi Hirokane	Big Comic Original (semimonthly); Shogakukan	November 20, 1995; June 29, 1996	Ongoing
58	81	889 (Note: Chapters as of volume 81.)	Kingdom (キングダム)	Yasuhisa Hara	Weekly Young Jump (weekly); Shueisha	January 26, 2006; May 19, 2006	Ongoing
59	81	391	Nanto Magoroku (なんと孫六)	Kei Sadayasu	Monthly Shōnen Magazine (monthly); Kodansha	March 6, 1981; August 20, 1981	May 2, 2014; July 14, 2014
60	81	731	Soumubu Soumuka Yamaguchi Roppeita (総務部総務課山口六平太)	Norio Hayashi, Kenichirou Takai	Big Comic (semimonthly); Shogakukan	September 23, 1985; January 30, 1987	November 10, 2016; January 30, 2017
61	81 (Note: Tokumei Kakarichō Tadano Hitoshi consists of three series. The first series, Tokumei Kakarichō Tadano Hitoshi is collected in 9 volumes; the second series, Shin Tokumei Kakarichō Tadano Hitoshi (新・特命係長只野仁) is collected in 20 volumes and the third series, Tokumei Kakarichō Tadano Hitoshi Final (特命係長只野仁ファイナル) is collected in 52 volumes.)	850	Tokumei Kakarichō Tadano Hitoshi (特命係長只野仁)	Kimio Yanagisawa	Shūkan Gendai; Kodansha; Comic Manga Ō (weekly); Green Arrow Shuppansha	August 29, 1998; December 15, 2000	2018; February 28, 2018
62	81 (Note: Ace of Diamond consists of two series. The original Ace of Diamond is collected in 47 volumes, and its sequel, Ace of Diamond Act II (ダイヤのA act2), is collected in 34 volumes.)	725	Ace of Diamond (ダイヤのA)	Yuji Terajima	Weekly Shōnen Magazine (weekly); Kodansha	May 17, 2006; September 15, 2006	October 26, 2022; May 17, 2023
63	79 (Note: Musashi Number 9 series consists of five series. The original series, Kyūbanme no Musashi (9番目のムサシ), is collected in 21 volumes. The first sequel, Kyūbanme no Musashi: Mission Blue (9番目のムサシ ミッション・ブルー), is collected in 8 volumes. The second sequel, Kyūbanme no Musashi: Red Scramble (9番目のムサシ レッドスクランブル), is collected in 12 volumes. The third sequel, Kyūbanme no Musashi: Silent Black (9番目のムサシ サイレントブラック), is collected in 15 volumes. The fourth sequel, Kyūbanme no Musashi: Ghost and Gray (9番目のムサシ ゴースト アンド グレイ), is ongoing and collected in 23 volumes.)	333 (Note: Chapters as of volume 79.)	Musashi Number 9 (9番目のムサシ)	Miyuki Takahashi	Kirara 16, Mystery Bonita (monthly); Akita Shoten	April 15, 1996; September 1, 1996	Ongoing
64	78	488	Zero: The Man of the Creation (ゼロ THE MAN OF THE CREATION)	Shirou Toozaki, Kei Satomi	Super Jump (semimonthly); Shueisha	1990; September 10, 1991	October 12, 2011; December 19, 2011
65	77 (Note: Aoba Jitensha-ten consists of four series. The original series, Namikibashidōri Aoba Jitensha-ten (並木橋通りアオバ自転車店), is collected in 20 volumes totaling 164 chapters; the second series, Aoba Jitensha-ten (アオバ自転車店), is collected in 20 volumes totaling 143 chapters; the third series, Aoba Jitensha-ten e Yōkoso! (アオバ自転車店へようこそ!), is collected in 20 volumes totaling 123 chapters; and the fourth series, Aoba Jitensha-ten to Ikō yo! (アオバ自転車店といこうよ!) is ongoing with 17 collected volumes totaling 107 chapters.)	537 (Note: Chapters as of volume 77.)	Aoba Jitensha-ten (アオバ自転車店)	Gaku Miyao	Young King (semimonthly), Monthly Young King, Young King Ours, Monthly Young King Ours GH (monthly); Shōnen Gahōsha	March 8, 1999; October 8, 1999	Ongoing
66	77 (Note: Fisherman Sanpei consists of two series. The original, Tsurikichi Sanpei, is collected in 65 volumes; Its sequel, Tsurikichi Sanpei: Heisei-ban, is collected in 12 volumes.)	605	Fisherman Sanpei (釣りキチ三平)	Takao Yaguchi	Weekly Shōnen Magazine (weekly); Kodansha	July 25, 1973; February 18, 1974	2010; May 17, 2010
67	77	704	Gintama (銀魂)	Hideaki Sorachi	Weekly Shōnen Jump (weekly); Shueisha	December 8, 2003; April 2, 2004	June 20, 2019; August 2, 2019
68	75	402	Marugoshi Deka (まるごし刑事)	Ken Kitashiba, Michio Watanabe	Manga Sunday (weekly); Jitsugyo no Nihon Sha	1986; September 1986	March 1, 2003; March 29, 2003
69	74	686 (Note: 15 chapters of Bleach were published with negative chapter numbers: -108 to -100 covering the whole volume 36 (after chapter 315 from volume 35) and -99 to -97 at the beginning of volume 37 (before chapter 316); chapter -17 at the end of volume 15, after chapter 130; chapter -16 at the end of volume 32, after chapter 286; chapter -12.5 at the beginning of volume 20, before chapter 169; these are included in this count. In addition, there's a special chapter at the end of volume 10 numbered 88.5, following chapter 88; a chapter 0.8 was published at the end of volume 12, after chapter 107; at the end of volume 23, after chapter 205, two chapters numbered "0. side-A" and "0. side-B" were published; and a misplaced chapter 520.5 was published after chapter 642, at the end of volume 70; these are also included in this count. As of August 22, 2016, 686 properly numbered chapters and 20 negative or otherwise oddly numbered chapters have been compiled into 74 volumes. There are also a few unnumbered chapters in the series' support material, but they're not included in this count.)	Bleach (ブリーチ)	Tite Kubo	Weekly Shōnen Jump (weekly); Shueisha	August 7, 2001; January 5, 2002	August 22, 2016; November 4, 2016
70	73 (Note: Sakigake!! Otokojuku consists of four series: The original series, Sakigake!! Otokojuku (魁!!男塾) collected in 34 volumes; the second series, Akatsuki!! Otokojuku: Seishen yo, Taishi no Dake (曉!!男塾 青年よ、大死を抱け) collected in 25 volumes; the third series, Goku!! Otokojuku (極!! 男塾) collected in 8 volumes; the fourth series, Shin!! Otokojuku (真!!男塾) collected in 6 volumes.)	637	Sakigake!! Otokojuku (魁!!男塾)	Akira Miyashita	Weekly Shōnen Jump; Super Jump (semimonthly); Shueisha; Weekly Manga Goraku (weekly); Nihon Bungeisha	April 30, 1985; February 1, 1986	April 26, 2019; July 29, 2019
71	72	1,142 (Note: Chapters as of volume 72.)	Sunset on Third Street (三丁目の夕日 夕焼けの詩)	Ryōhei Saigan	Big Comic Original (semimonthly); Shogakukan	September 1974; September 29, 1975	Ongoing
72	72 (Note: Kattobi Itto consists of two series. The original Kattobi Itto is collected in 46 volumes and its sequel, Buttobi Itto (風飛び一斗), is collected in 26 volumes.)	268	Kattobi Itto (かっとび一斗)	Motoki Monma	Monthly Shōnen Jump (monthly); Shueisha	August 4, 1985; June 10, 1986	May 2, 2007; September 4, 2007
73	72	700 (Note: Naruto is split into two parts by a 2 1/2 year timeskip; Part I consists of 27 volumes with 244 chapters, and Part II (1, 2) contains the remaining 45 volumes and 456 chapters.)	Naruto (NARUTO -ナルト-)	Masashi Kishimoto	Weekly Shōnen Jump (weekly); Shueisha	September 20, 1999; March 3, 2000	November 10, 2014; February 4, 2015
74	72 (Note: Sengoku consists of four series. The original, Sengoku (センゴク) is collected in 15 volumes. its sequel, Sengoku Tenshouki (センゴク天正記) is collected in 15 volumes, its second sequel, Sengoku Ittouki (センゴク一統記), is collected in 15 volumes, and its third sequel, Sengoku Gonbee (センゴク権兵衛), is collected in 27 volumes.)	676	Sengoku (センゴク)	Hideki Miyashita	Weekly Young Magazine (weekly); Kodansha	April 19, 2004; November 3, 2004	February 28, 2022 May 6, 2022
75	72 (Note: Drops of God consists of three series. The original Drops of God is collected in 44 volumes; its sequel, Marriage ~The Drops of God Final Arc~ (マリアージュ 〜神の雫 最終章〜) is collected in 26 volumes and its second sequel, Drops of God deuxième (神の雫 deuxième) is collected in 2 volumes.)	698	Drops of God (神の雫)	Tadashi Agi, Shuu Okimoto	Morning (weekly); Kodansha	November 18, 2004; March 23, 2004	April 18, 2024; May 22, 2024
76	71	696 (Note: Chapters as of volume 71.)	Crest of the Royal Family (王家の紋章)	Chieko Hosokawa	Princess (monthly); Akita Shoten	September 6, 1976; January 24, 1977	Ongoing
77	71	707 (Note: Chapters as of volume 71.)	Giant Killing (ジャイアントキリング)	Masaya Tsunamoto, Tsujitomo	Morning (weekly); Kodansha	January 11, 2007; April 23, 2007	Ongoing
78	71	480	Dreams (ドリームス)	Tarō Nami, Sanbanchi Kawa	Weekly Shōnen Magazine (weekly); Magazine Special (monthly); Kodansha	August 21, 1996; November 15, 1996	January 20, 2017; February 17, 2017
79	71 (Note: Ousama no Shitateya consists of four series. The first series, Ousama no Shitateya: Sarto Finito, is collected in 32 volumes; the second series, Ousama no Shitateya: Sartoria Napoletana (王様の仕立て屋 ～サルトリア・ナポレターナ～), is collected in 13 volumes; the third series, Ousama no Shitateya: Fiori di Girasole (王様の仕立て屋 ~フィオリ・ディ・ジラソーレ~), is collected in 7 volumes and the fourth series, Ousama no Shitateya: Shitamachi Tailor (王様の仕立て屋 ~下町テーラー~) is collected in 19 volumes.)	480	Ousama no Shitateya (王様の仕立て屋)	Ton Okawara	Super Jump, Grand Jump (semimonthly); Shueisha	June 25, 2003; January 5, 2004	July 3, 2024; August 19, 2024
80	70 (Note: The Seven Deadly Sins consists of two series. The original, The Seven Deadly Sins (七つの大罪) is collected in 41 volumes. Its sequel, The Seven Deadly Sins: Four Knights of the Apocalypse (黙示録の四騎士) is ongoing at 29 volumes.)	601 (Note: Chapters as of volume 70.)	The Seven Deadly Sins (七つの大罪)	Nakaba Suzuki	Weekly Shōnen Magazine (weekly); Kodansha	October 10, 2012; February 15, 2013	Ongoing
81	70 (Note: Puzzle Game High School consists of eight series. The first series, Puzzle Game High School (パズルゲーム☆はいすくーる), is collected in 34 volumes; the second series, Shin Puzzle Game High School (新パズルゲーム☆はいすくーる), is collected in 6 volumes; the third series, Puzzle Game High School X (パズルゲーム☆はいすくーるX), is collected in 8 volumes; the fourth series, Puzzle Game Treasure (パズルゲーム☆トレジャー), is collected in 4 volumes; the fifth series, Puzzle Game Pro (パズルゲーム☆Pro), is collected in 3 volumes; the sixth series, Puzzle Game Luxury (パズルゲーム☆ラグジュアリー), is collected in 5 volumes; the seventh series, Puzzle Game Prestige (パズルゲーム☆プレステージ), is collected in 4 volumes and the eighth series, Puzzle Game Succeed (パズルゲーム☆サクシード), is collected in 6 volumes.)		Puzzle Game High School (パズルゲーム☆はいすくーる)	Miyuki Noma	Hana to Yume; Hakusensha; Mystery Bonita (monthly); Akita Shoten	1983; January 1, 1984	2020; December 4, 2020
82	69		Kariage-kun (かりあげクン)	Masashi Ueda	Manga Action (weekly), Manga Town (monthly); Futabasha	1980; December 5, 1980	July 7, 2026
83	69 (Note: The original Arakure Knight is collected in 28 volumes; its sequel, Arakure Knight: Koukou Bakusouhen (荒くれKNIGHT 高校爆走編), is collected in 11 volumes; its second sequel, Arakure Knight: Kuroi Zankyō Kanketsu-hen (荒くれKNIGHT 黒い残響完結編), is collected in 20 volumes and its third sequel, Arakure Knight: Remember Tomorrow (荒くれKNIGHT リメンバー・トゥモロー) is collected in 10 volumes.)	624	Arakure Knight (荒くれKNIGHT)	Satoshi Yoshida	Young King; Shōnen Gahōsha Young Champion (semimonthly); Akita Shoten	1995; April 24, 1996	November 22, 2021; March 17, 2022
84	68	6,477	Sazae-san (サザエさん)	Machiko Hasegawa	Asahi Shōgakusei Shimbun (daily); Asahi Shimbun	April 22, 1946; September 20, 1994	February 21, 1974; September 20, 1994
85	68 (Note: Wild 7 consists of five series. The original, "Wild 7" (ワイルド7), is collected in 48 volumes; the second series, "Shin Wild 7" (新ワイルド7), is collected in 14 volumes; the third series, "Zoku Shin Wild 7" (続・新ワイルド7), is collected in 2 volumes; the fourth series, "Hiyou - Mou Hitotsu no Wild 7" (飛葉 もうひとつのワイルド7), is collected in 2 volumes and the fifth series, "Wild 7 R" (ワイルド7 R), is collected in 2 volumes.)		Wild 7 (ワイルド7)	Mikiya Mochizuki	Shōnen King; Shōnen Gahōsha; Comic Banban, Weekly Asahi Geinō; Tokuma Shoten; Manga Sunday (weekly); Jitsugyo no Nihon Sha	September 21, 1969; August 1, 1970	2011; December 21, 2011
86	67	786	Jarinko Chie (じゃりン子チエ)	Etsumi Haruki	Manga Action (weekly); Futabasha	September 28, 1978; May 1979	August 5, 1997; November 1997
87	67 (Note: Kōgyō Aika Volleyboys consists of two series: The original Kōgyō Aika Volleyboys (工業哀歌バレーボーイズ) is collected in 50 volumes and its sequel, Kōshoku Aika Moto Volleyboys (好色哀歌 元バレーボーイズ), is collected in 17 volumes.)	711	Kōgyō Aika Volleyboys (工業哀歌バレーボーイズ)	Hiroyuki Murada	Weekly Young Magazine (weekly); Kodansha	1989; July 17, 1989	2011; July 6, 2011
88	67 (Note: Violinist of Hameln consists of three series. The original, Violinist of Hameln (ハーメルンのバイオリン弾き) is collected in 37 volumes; its sequel, Violinist of Hameln: Shchelkunchik (ハーメルンのバイオリン弾き〜シェルクンチク〜), is collected in 8 volumes; its second sequel, Zoku Violinist of Hameln: Ai no Bolero (続 ハーメルンのバイオリン弾き), is collected in 22 volumes.)	314	Violinist of Hameln (ハーメルンのバイオリン弾き)	Michiaki Watanabe	Monthly Shōnen Gangan (monthly), Young Gangan (semimonthly); Square Enix	March 12, 1991; September 22, 1991	2025; April 14, 2025
89	66 (Note: Ryūrōden consists of three series. The original, Ryūrōden (龍狼伝), is collected in 37 volumes and 158 chapters; its sequel, Ryūrōden: Chugen Ryōran-hen (龍狼伝 中原繚乱編), is collected in 17 volumes and its second sequel, Ryūrōden: Ouha Rikkoku-hen (龍狼伝 王霸立国編), is ongoing with 12 volumes.)	343 (Note: Chapters as of volume 66.)	Ryūrōden (龍狼伝)	Yoshito Yamahara	Monthly Shōnen Magazine (monthly); Kodansha	July 6, 1993; December 16, 1993	Ongoing
90	66	528 (Note: Chapters as of volume 66.)	Mukoubuchi (むこうぶち)	Etsuya Amajishi	Kindai Mahjong (semimonthly); Takeshobo	1999; November 7, 1999	Ongoing
91	66 (Note: Afro Tanaka consists of seven series: Kōkō Afro Tanaka (高校アフロ田中), Chūtai Afro Tanaka (中退アフロ田中), Jōkyō Afro Tanaka (上京アフロ田中), Sasurai Afro Tanaka (さすらいアフロ田中), Shiawase Afro Tanaka (しあわせアフロ田中) and Kekkon Afro Tanaka (結婚アフロ田中) were collected in 10 volumes each. The seventh series, My Home Afro Tanaka (マイホームアフロ田中) is currently ongoing with 6 collected volumes.)	716 (Note: Chapters as of volume 66.)	Afro Tanaka (アフロ田中)	Masaharu Noritsuke	Big Comic Spirits (weekly); Shogakukan	December 3, 2001; April 26, 2002	Ongoing
92	66 (Note: Maji! series consists of four series. The original manga, Maji!, is collected in 50 volumes; its sequel, Maji! II (本気!II), is collected in 5 volumes; the third series, Maji! Samdhana (本気!サンダーナ), is collected in 7 volumes; the fourth series, Maji! Shuushou Kayaku (本気! 終章 火薬) is collected in 4 volumes.)	578	Maji! (本気！)	Ayumi Tachihara	Weekly Shōnen Champion (weekly); Young Champion (semimonthly); Akita Shoten	August 29, 1986; January 1, 1987	August 22, 2023; May 20, 2024
93	66 (Note: Jingi consists of three series which includes the original Jingi which is collected in 33 volumes, JingiS (仁義S) which is collected in 19 volumes and Jingi Zero (仁義 零) which is collected in 14 volumes.)	553	Jingi (仁義)	Ayumi Tachihara	Young Champion (semimonthly); Akita Shoten	March 22, 1988; December 19, 1988	October 30, 2017; November 20, 2017
94	66 (Note: Shoot! consists of four series. The original series, Shoot! (シュート!), is collected in 33 volumes; its prequel, Shoot! ~Aoki Meguriai~ (シュート! 〜蒼きめぐり逢い〜), is collected in 5 volumes; the sequel to the original series, Shoot! ~Atsuki Chōsen~ (シュート! ～熱き挑戦～), is collected in 12 volumes; the final series, Shoot! ~Aratanaru Densetsu~ (シュート! 〜新たなる伝説〜), is collected in 16 volumes.)	580	Shoot! (シュート!)	Tsukasa Ōshima	Weekly Shōnen Magazine (weekly); Kodansha	August 8, 1990; January 1991	May 14, 2003; June 17, 2003
95	66 (Note: Boys Be... consists of five series. The first series, Boys Be..., is collected in 32 volumes; the second series, Boys Be... 2nd Season, is collected in 20 volumes; the third series, Boys Be... L CO-OP, is collected in 6 volumes; the fourth series, Boys Be... Next Season, is collected in 6 volumes and the fifth series, Boys Be... ~young adult~, is collected in 2 volumes.)	495	Boys Be... (新恋愛白書)	Masahiro Itabashi, Hiroyuki Tamakoshi	Weekly Shōnen Magazine (weekly); Magazine Special; Kodansha; Monthly Dragon Age (monthly); Fujimi Shobo	July 24, 1991; January 17, 1992	July 9, 2018; October 9, 2018
96	66 (Note: Azumi consists of two series. The original, Azumi (あずみ) is collected in 48 volumes. Its sequel, Azumi (－あずみ－) is collected in 18 volumes.)	475	Azumi (あずみ)	Yū Koyama	Big Comic Superior (semimonthly); Shogakukan	July 15, 1994; January 30, 1995	February 28, 2014; April 30, 2014
97	66 (Note: Negima! Magister Negi Magi consists of two series. The original, Negima! Magister Negi Magi (魔法先生ネギま!) is collected in 38 volumes. Its sequel, UQ Holder!: Magister Negi Magi! 2 (UQ HOLDER! 〜魔法先生ネギま!2〜) is collected in 28 volumes.)	547	Negima! Magister Negi Magi (魔法先生ネギま!)	Ken Akamatsu	Weekly Shōnen Magazine (weekly); Bessatsu Shōnen Magazine (monthly); Kodansha	February 26, 2003; July 16, 2003	February 9, 2022; March 9, 2022
98	65	575 (Note: Chapters as of volume 65.)	Tonbo! (オーイ! とんぼ)	Ken Kawasaki, Yū Furusawa	Weekly Golf Digest (weekly); Golf Digest	August 4, 2014; May 28, 2016	Ongoing
99	65	362	Rakudai Ninja Rantarō (落第忍者乱太郎)	Sōbē Amako	Asahi Shōgakusei Shimbun (daily); Asahi Shimbun	January 7, 1986; March 1993	December 29, 2018; November 30, 2019
100	65 (Note: Karura Mau consists of nine series. The original, "Hengen Taima Yakou - Karura Mau!" (変幻退魔夜行 カルラ舞う!), is collected in 18 volumes; The first sequel, "Hengen Taima Yakou Shin Karura Mau!" (変幻退魔夜行 新 カルラ舞う!), is collected in 18 volumes; The second sequel, "Shin Karura Mau!" (真・カルラ舞う!), is collected in 8 volumes; The third sequel, "Hengen Taima Yakou - Chou Karura Mau!" (変幻退魔夜行 超・カルラ舞う!), is collected in 5 volumes; The fourth sequel, "Hengen Taima Yakou - Karura Mau! - Shoutoku Taishi no Jujutsu Hen" (変幻退魔夜行 カルラ舞う! 聖徳太子の呪術編), is collected in 3 volumes; The fifth sequel, "Hengen Taima Yakou - Karura Mau! - Shounen Onmyouji" (変幻退魔夜行カルラ舞う!少年陰陽師), is collected in 3 volumes; The sixth sequel, "Hengen Taima Yakou - Karura Mau! - Katsuragi no Kodaishin" (カルラ舞う! 変幻退魔夜行 葛城の古代神), is collected in 3 volumes; The seventh sequel, "Hengen Taima Yakou - Karura Mau! - Gaiden Abe Seimei Hen" (変幻退魔夜行 カルラ舞う! ~外伝 安倍晴明編~), is collected in 3 volumes and the eighth sequel, "Hengen Taima Yakou Karura Mau! Kokoku Geneijou" (変幻退魔夜行 カルラ舞う! 湖国幻影城), is collected in 4 volumes.)		Karura Mau (カルラ舞う!)	Takakazu Nagakubo	Monthly Halloween; Asahi Sonorama; Suspiria, Mystery Bonita (monthly); Akita Shoten	September 10, 1986; February 1, 1988	November 6, 2017; January 16, 2019
101	64	616 (Note: Chapters as of volume 64.)	Pokémon Adventures (ポケットモンスターSPECIAL)	Hidenori Kusaka, Satoshi Yamamoto	CoroCoro Ichiban!, Shogakukan's separate grade learning magazines (former), Pokémon Fan / Pokémon Wonderland (former), Club Sunday / Sunday Webry (web) (former)(monthly); Shogakukan	March 3, 1997; August 8, 1997	Ongoing
102	64	281 (Note: Chapters as of volume 64.)	Kinpeibai (金瓶梅)	Mami Takezaki	Manga Grimm Douwa (monthly); Bunkasha	2004; November 12, 2004	Ongoing
103	64 (Note: Fuuunjitachi consists of two series. The original, Fuuunjitachi (風雲児たち) is collected in 30 volumes and its sequel, Fuuunjitachi: Bakumatsuhen (風雲児たち 幕末編), is collected in 34 volumes.)	461	Fuuunjitachi (風雲児たち)	Tarou Minamoto	Comic Tom; Ushio Shuppansha; Comic Ran (monthly); LEED Publishing, Bungeishunjū	1979; February 1, 1982	2020; August 27, 2020
104	63 (Note: Kenichi: The Mightiest Disciple consists of two series. The original, Kenichi: The Mightiest Disciple (史上最強の弟子ケンイチ) is collected in 61 volumes; Its sequel, Kenichi the Mightiest Disciple 2: Masters Arc (史上最強の弟子ケンイチ2 達人編), is currently ongoing and collected in 2 volumes.)	599 (Note: Chapters as of volume 63.)	Kenichi: The Mightiest Disciple (史上最強の弟子ケンイチ)	Syun Matsuena	Weekly Shōnen Sunday, Sunday Webry (weekly); Shogakukan	April 17, 2002; August 9, 2002	Ongoing
105	63 (Note: Dark Angel consists of five series. The original series, "Dark Angel" (ダーク・エンジェル), is collected in 22 volumes; The first sequel, "Dark Angel II - M no Densetsu" (Mの伝説～ダーク・エンジェル2～), is collected in 13 volumes; The second sequel, "M - Dark Angel III" (M～ダーク・エンジェルIII～), is collected in 12 volumes; The third sequel, "Doctor M - Dark Angel IV" (ドクターM ―ダーク・エンジェルIV), is collected in 8 volumes; The fourth sequel, "Dark Angel Legend - Kegai Hikawa Miwako" (ダーク・エンジェル レジェンド 外科医 氷川魅和子), is collected in 8 volumes.)	290	Dark Angel (ダーク・エンジェル)	Hiroko Kazama	Elegance Eve (monthly); Akita Shoten	1995; January 19, 1996	March 26, 2020; June 16, 2020
106	63	616	Psychic Squad (絶対可憐チルドレン)	Takashi Shiina	Weekly Shōnen Sunday (weekly); Shogakukan	August 25, 2005; October 18, 2005	July 14, 2021; September 17, 2021
107	63	549	Fairy Tail (フェアリーテイル)	Hiro Mashima	Weekly Shōnen Magazine (weekly); Kodansha	August 2, 2006; December 15, 2006	July 26, 2017; November 17, 2017
108	62	635	Emblem Take 2 (代紋TAKE2)	Kazumasa Kiuchi, Jun Watanabe	Weekly Young Magazine (weekly); Kodansha	February 19, 1990; July 17, 1990	August 30, 2004; April 30, 2005
109	62	478	Godhand Teru (ゴッドハンド輝)	Kazuki Yamamoto	Weekly Shōnen Magazine (weekly); Kodansha	April 4, 2001; July 17, 2001	October 5, 2011; February 17, 2012
110	61	819 (Note: Chapters as of volume 61.)	Super Mario-kun (スーパーマリオくん)	Yukio Sawada	CoroCoro Comic (monthly); Shogakukan	1990; July 27, 1991	Ongoing
111	61 (Note: Kengan Ashura consists of two series. The original, Kengan Ashura (ケンガンアシュラ) is collected in 27 volumes. Its sequel, Kengan Omega (ケンガンオメガ) is ongoing at 34 volumes.)	607	Kengan Ashura (ケンガンアシュラ)	Yabako Sandrovich, Daromeon	Ura Sunday (weekly); Shogakukan	April 18, 2012; December 18, 2012	Ongoing
112	61 (Note: The Chef consists of two series. The original, The Chef (ザ・シェフ) is collected in 41 volumes and its sequel, The Chef: Shinshō (ザ・シェフ－新章) is collected in 20 volumes.)	488	The Chef (ザ・シェフ)	Mai Tsurugina, Tadashi Katō	Weekly Manga Goraku (weekly); Bessatsu Manga Goraku (monthly); Nihon Bungeisha	1985; April 19, 1985	August 25, 2012; September 18, 2012
113	60 (Note: Kamen Rider Spirits consists of three series. The original, Kamen Rider Spirits (仮面ライダーSPIRITS), is collected in 16 volumes; Its first sequel, Shin Kamen Rider Spirits (新仮面ライダーSPIRITS), is collected in 42 volumes and its second sequel, Shin Kamen Rider Spirits – Lonely Kamen Rider Edition (新仮面ライダーSPIRITS ロンリー仮面ライダー編), is ongoing and collected in 2 volume$.)	277 (Note: Chapters as of volume 60.)	Kamen Rider Spirits (仮面ライダーSPIRITS)	Kenichi Muraeda	Monthly Magazine Z, Monthly Shōnen Magazine (monthly); Kodansha	November 25, 2000; April 20, 2001	Ongoing
114	60	721 (Note: Chapters as of volume 60.)	Meshibana Deka Tachibana (めしばな刑事タチバナ)	Sabei Sakado, Tori Tabii	Weekly Asahi Geinō (weekly); Tokuma Shoten	December 30, 2010; March 30, 2011	Ongoing
115	60	438	Sangokushi (三国志)	Mitsuteru Yokoyama	Comic Tom (monthly); Ushio Shuppansha	1971; April 20, 1974	1986; October 20, 1988
116	60 (Note: Keirin Yarou consists of two series. The original, Keirin Yarou: Shuu to Kazumi no Love Story (ケイリン野郎 周と和美のラブストーリー) is collected in 56 volumes and its sequel, Keirin Yarou GP (ケイリン野郎GP), is collected in 4 volumes.)	228	Keirin Yarou (ケイリン野郎)	Riki Kusaka	Judy (monthly); Shogakukan	1989; June 26, 1991	2006; July 26, 2006
117	59		Sake no Hosomichi (酒のほそ道)	Roswell Hosoki	Weekly Manga Goraku (weekly); Nihon Bungeisha	1994; January 19, 1996	Ongoing
118	59 (Note: Amai Seikatsu consists of two series. The original Amai Seikatsu manga is collected in 40 volumes, and its sequel, Amai Seikatsu: 2nd Season (甘い生活 2nd season), is collected in 19 volumes.)	739	Amai Seikatsu (甘い生活)	Hikaru Yuzuki	Business Jump, Grand Jump (semimonthly); Shueisha	May 15, 1990; December 13, 1990	June 5, 2024; September 19, 2024
119	59	615	Kura no Yado (蔵の宿)	Yūji Nishi, Toshinobu Tana	Weekly Manga Times (weekly); Houbunsha	September 1998; May 17, 1999	2022; May 15, 2022
120	59 (Note: Naniwa Tomoare consists of 2 series. The original series, Naniwa Tomoare (ナニワトモアレ), is collected in 28 volumes; its sequel, Naniwa Tomoare (なにわ友あれ), is collected in 31 volumes.)	644	Naniwa Tomoare (ナニワトモアレ)	Katsuhisa Minami	Weekly Young Magazine (weekly); Kodansha	November 29, 1999; December 4, 2000	June 16, 2014; September 5, 2014
121	58	491	Ashita Tenki ni Naare (あした天気になあれ)	Tetsuya Chiba	Weekly Shōnen Magazine (weekly); Kodansha	October 1, 1980; April 1, 1981	May 29, 1991; July 1, 1991
122	58	242	Wataru ga Pyun! (わたるがぴゅん!)	Tsuyoshi Nakaima	Monthly Shōnen Jump (monthly); Shueisha	1984; June 10, 1985	2004; November 4, 2004
123	57 (Note: Chihayafuru consists of two series. The original, Chihayafuru (ちはやふる) is collected in 50 volumes and its sequel, Chihayafuru Plus: Kimi ga Tame (ちはやふる plus きみがため), is currently ongoing and collected in 7 volumes.)	274 (Note: Chapters as of volume 57.)	Chihayafuru (ちはやふる)	Yuki Suetsugu	Be Love (monthly); Kodansha	December 28, 2007; May 13, 2008	Ongoing
124	57	498	The Knight in the Area (エリアの騎士)	Hiroaki Igano, Kaya Tsukiyama	Weekly Shōnen Magazine (weekly); Kodansha	April 30, 2006; August 17, 2006	March 29, 2017; May 17, 2017
125	57 (Note: Gamaran consists of two series. The original Gamaran manga is collected in 22 volumes and its sequel, Gamaran: Shura (我間乱―修羅―), is collected in 35 volumes.)	505	Gamaran (我間乱)	Yousuke Nakamaru	Weekly Shōnen Magazine; Magazine Pocket (weekly); Kodansha	May 13, 2009; August 17, 2009	February 27, 2025; April 9, 2025
126	56 (Note: Hell Teacher: Jigoku Sensei Nube consists of four series. The first series, Hell Teacher Nūbē, is collected in 31 volumes; the second series, Hell Teacher Nūbē Neo (地獄先生ぬ〜べ〜NEO) is collected in 17 volumes; the third series, Hell Teacher Nūbē S (地獄先生ぬ〜べ〜S) is collected in 4 volumes; the fourth series, Hell Teacher Nūbē Kai (地獄先生ぬ〜べ〜怪) is ongoing and collected in 4 volumes.)	435 (Note: Chapters as of volume 56.)	Hell Teacher: Jigoku Sensei Nube (地獄先生ぬ〜べ〜)	Shou Makura, Takeshi Okano	Weekly Shōnen Jump (weekly), Grand Jump, Saikyō Jump (semimonthly); Shueisha	September 1993; January 16, 1994	Ongoing
127	56 (Note: Grandpa Danger consists of four series. The first series, Zettai Zetsumei: Dangerous Jii-san, is collected in 20 volumes; the second series, Dangerous Jii-san Ja (でんぢゃらすじーさん邪), is collected in 20 volumes; the third series, Nanto! Dangerous Jii-san (なんと!でんぢゃらすじーさん), is collected in 16 volumes and the fourth series, Mecha Kawa▽Dangerous Jii-san (漫画：でんぢゃらすじーさん), is currently ongoing and not collected in any volume yet.)	390 (Note: Chapters as of volume 56.)	Grandpa Danger (でんぢゃらすじーさん)	Kazutoshi Soyama	CoroCoro Comic; Shogakukan	September 14, 2001; October 2001	Ongoing
128	56	224 (Note: Chapters as of volume 56.)	Kenkaku Shōbai (剣客商売)	Yasuichi Oshima	Comic Ran (monthly); LEED Publishing, Bungeishunjū	2008; June 26, 2008	Ongoing
129	56 (Note: Kinzo no Agatte Nanbo!! consists of three series. The original manga, Kinzo no Agatte Nanbo!!, is collected in 8 volumes; its sequel, Shin Agatte Nanbo!! Taichi yo Nakuna (新上ってなンボ!!太一よ泣くな), is collected in 36 volumes; the third series, Shin ya Uetsute Nanbo!! Taichi yo Nakuna (新々 上ってなンボ!! 太一よ泣くな) is collected in 12 volumes.)		Kinzo no Agatte Nanbo!! (キンゾーの上ってなンボ!!)	Kazuo Koike, Seisaku Kanou	Weekly Sankei (weekly); Fusousha; Albatross View (semimonthly); Koike Shoin	September 6, 1984; July 11, 1988	2009; December 21, 2009
130	56		Gekiga Ningen Kakumei (劇画 人間革命)	Isami Ishii	Seikyo Shōgakusei Shimbun (daily); Seikyo Shimbun	January 2, 1989	February 11, 2003
131	56	563	Inuyasha (犬夜叉)	Rumiko Takahashi	Weekly Shōnen Sunday (weekly); Shogakukan	November 13, 1996; April 18, 1997	June 15, 2008; February 18, 2009
132	56 (Note: Karate Shōkōshi Kohinata Minoru consists of two series. The original Karate Shōkōshi Kohinata Minoru manga is collected in 50 volumes and its sequel, Karate Shoukoushi Monogatari (空手小公子物語), is collected in 6 volumes.)	563	Karate Shōkōshi Kohinata Minoru (空手小公子 小日向海流)	Yasushi Baba	Weekly Young Magazine (weekly); Kodansha	March 27, 2000; July 6, 2000	April 14, 2014; June 6, 2014
133	55 (Note: Gurazeni consists of four series. The first series, Gurazeni, is collected in 17 volumes; the second series, Gurazeni: Tokyo Dome-hen (グラゼニ 〜東京ドーム編〜) is collected in 15 volumes; the third series, Gurazeni: Pa League-Hen (グラゼニ ～パ・リーグ編～) is collected in 13 volumes and the fourth series, Gurazeni: Dai League-Hen (グラゼニ 〜大リーグ編〜) is ongoing at 10 volumes.)	455 (Note: Chapters as of volume 55.)	Gurazeni (グラゼニ)	Yuji Moritaka, Keiji Adachi	Morning (weekly); Kodansha	December 2, 2010; May 23, 2011	Ongoing
134	55 (Note: Yajikita Gakuen Douchuuki consists of three series. The original series, Yajikita Gakuen Douchuuki (やじきた学園道中記), is collected in 29 volumes; The first sequel, Yajikita Gakuen Douchuuki II (やじきた学園道中記II), is collected in 12 volumes and the second sequel, Yajikita Gakuen Douchuuki F (やじきた学園道中記F), is collected in 14 volumes.)	542	Yajikita Gakuen Douchuuki (やじきた学園道中記)	Ryouko Shitou	Princess Gold, Mystery Bonita (monthly); Akita Shoten	August 25, 1982; July 1, 1984	April 6, 2022; June 16, 2022
135	55	260	Manga Nihon no Rekishi (マンガ 日本の歴史)	Shotaro Ishinomori	Chūō Kōron (monthly); Chuokoron-Shinsha	1989; November 8, 1989	1994; June 20, 1994
136	55 (Note: Dragon Quest Retsuden: Roto no Monshō consists of two series. The original Dragon Quest Retsuden: Roto no Monshō (ドラゴンクエスト列伝 ロトの紋章) is collected in 21 volumes totaling 86 chapters; The sequel, Dragon Quest Retsuden: Roto no Monshō 〜Monshō wo Tsugumono-tachi e〜 (ドラゴンクエスト列伝 ロトの紋章 〜紋章を継ぐ者達へ〜) is collected in 34 volumes totaling 324 chapters.)	410	Dragon Quest Retsuden: Roto no Monshō (ドラゴンクエスト列伝 ロトの紋章)	Chiaki Kawamata, Kamui Fujiwara	Monthly Shōnen Gangan (monthly); Young Gangan (semimonthly); Square Enix	1991; September 20, 1991	January 4, 2020; March 25, 2020
137	55 (Note: Odds consists of three series. The first series, Odds, is collected in 10 volumes; the second series, Odds GP! Is collected in 14 volumes; the third series, Odds VS! is collected in 31 volumes.)	329	Odds (オッズ)	Osamu Ishiwata	Young Sunday Shogakukan Manga Action (weekly) Futabasha	2006; July 5, 2006	2023; November 7, 2023
138	54	238	Alfheim no Kishi (妖精国の騎士)	Seika Nakayama	Princess (monthly); Akita Shoten	September 1986; February 1987	2006; December 15, 2006
139	54 (Note: Wangan Midnight consists of two series. The original Wangan Midnight manga is collected in 42 volumes; its sequel, Wangan Midnight: C1 Runner (湾岸ミッドナイト C1ランナー), is collected in 12 volumes.)	690	Wangan Midnight (湾岸ミッドナイト)	Michiharu Kusunoki	Big Comic Spirits; Shogakukan; Weekly Young Magazine (weekly); Kodansha	January 8, 1990; January 5, 1993	July 9, 2012; October 5, 2012
140	53 (Note: Ramen Hakkenden consists of three series. The first series, Ramen Hakkenden is collected in 26 volumes; the second series, Ramen Saiyuuki (らーめん才遊記) is collected in 11 volumes; and the third series, Ramen Saiyuuki Shin (らーめん才遊記), is currently ongoing with 16 volumes.)	488 (Note: Chapters as of volume 53.)	Ramen Hakkenden (ラーメン発見伝)	Rokurou Kube, Hitoe Kawai	Big Comic, Big Comic Superior (semimonthly); Shogakukan	November 8, 1999; April 26, 2000	Ongoing
141	53	342 (Note: Chapters as of volume 53.)	Skip Beat! (スキップ・ビート!)	Yoshiki Nakamura	Hana to Yume (weekly); Hakusensha	February 15, 2002; July 19, 2002	Ongoing
142	53	484	Mandaraya no Ryouta (まんだら屋の良太)	Jun Hatanaka	Manga Sunday (weekly); Jitsugyo no Nihon Sha	1979; December 6, 1979	April 20, 1989; December 1, 1989
143	52 (Note: Circuit no Ōkami manga includes the original 27-volume series and its 25-volume sequel called Circuit no Ōkami II: Modena no Tsurugi (サーキットの狼II モデナの剣).)	500	Circuit no Ōkami (サーキットの狼)	Satoshi Ikezawa	Weekly Shōnen Jump, Weekly Playboy (weekly); Shueisha	1975; January 31, 1976	1995; August 1995
144	52 (Note: Dr. Typhoon consists of three series. The original manga, Dr. Typhoon, is collected in 25 volumes; its sequel, Dr. Typhoon JR (Dr.タイフーンJR), is collected in 11 volumes; the third series, Ganso Dr. Typhoon (元祖Dr.タイフーン) is collected in 16 volumes.)	532	Dr. Typhoon (Dr.タイフーン)	Michitsuna Takahashi, Eiji Kazama	Manga Action (weekly); Futabasha	1986; March 1, 1986	2000; December 1, 2000
145	52 (Note: 3x3 Eyes series consists of three series. The original manga, 3x3 Eyes, is collected in 40 volumes; its sequel, 3x3 Eyes: Kenjū no Mori no Sōnansha (3×3 EYES 幻獣の森の遭難者), is collected in 4 volumes; the third series, 3x3 Eyes: Kiseki no Yami no Keiyakusha (3×3EYES 鬼籍の闇の契約者) is collected in 8 volumes.)	745	3×3 Eyes (サザンアイズ)	Yuzo Takada	Weekly Young Magazine (weekly), Young Magazine Kaizokuban, E-Young Magazine; Kodansha	December 14, 1987; October 17, 1988	May 18, 2023; September 20, 2023
146	52 (Note: Boys Over Flowers consists of two series. The original, Boys Over Flowers (花より男子) is collected in 37 volumes. Its sequel, Boys Over Flowers Season 2 (花のち晴れ～花男 Next Season～) is collected in 15 volumes.)	357	Boys Over Flowers (花より男子)	Yoko Kamio	Margaret (semimonthly), Shōnen Jump+ (weekly); Shueisha	October 1992; October 28, 1992	December 22, 2019; March 3, 2020
147	52 (Note: Midori no Makibaō manga is divided into three series which includes the original Midori no Makibaō contains 16 volumes, 16 volumes of Taiyou no Makibaō (たいようのマキバオー) and 20 volumes of Taiyou no Makibaō W (たいようのマキバオーW).)	580	Midori no Makibaō (みどりのマキバオー)	Tsunomaru	Weekly Shōnen Jump, Weekly Playboy (weekly); Shueisha	November 15, 1994; June 1, 1995	November 14, 2016; February 17, 2017
148	52 (Note: Jotei consists of two series. The original Jotei manga is collected in 24 volumes, and its sequel, Jotei: Hanamai (女帝 花舞), is collected in 28 volumes.)	531	Jotei (女帝)	Ryou Kurashina, Issaku Wake	Weekly Manga Times; Houbunsha; Weekly Manga Goraku (weekly); Nihon Bungeisha	1996; April 15, 1997	February 2007; April 19, 2007
149	52	568	Hayate the Combat Butler (ハヤテのごとく!)	Kenjiro Hata	Weekly Shōnen Sunday (weekly); Shogakukan	October 6, 2004; February 18, 2005	April 12, 2017; June 16, 2017
150	51	612 (Note: Chapters as of volume 51.)	Ahiru no Sora (あひるの空)	Takeshi Hinata	Weekly Shōnen Magazine (weekly); Kodansha	December 10, 2003; May 15, 2004	Ongoing
151	51 (Note: Tōhai consists of four series. The first series, Tōhai, is collected in 12 volumes; the second series, Tōhai: Hitobashira-hen (凍牌 ～人柱篇～) is collected in 16 volumes; the third series, Tōhai: Minagoroshi-hen (凍牌~ミナゴロシ篇~) is collected in 10 volumes and the fourth series, Tōhai: Cold Girl (凍牌 ～コールドガール～) is currently ongoing at 13 volumes.)	465 (Note: Chapters as of volume 51.)	Tōhai (凍牌)	Kōji Shinasaka	Young Champion (semimonthly); Akita Shoten	June 27, 2006; December 20, 2006	Ongoing
152	51	456 (Note: Chapters as of volume 51.)	Welcome to Demon School! Iruma-kun (魔入りました! 入間くん)	Osamu Nishi	Weekly Shōnen Champion (weekly); Akita Shoten	March 2, 2017; July 7, 2017	Ongoing
153	51 (Note: Ring ni Kakero consists of two series. The original Ring ni Kakero manga is collected in 25 volumes, and its sequel, Ring ni Kakero 2 (リングにかけろ2), is collected in 26 volumes.)	456	Ring ni Kakero (リングにかけろ)	Masami Kurumada	Weekly Shōnen Jump (weekly), Super Jump (semimonthly); Shueisha	January 10, 1977; January 1978	November 26, 2008; February 4, 2009
154	51 (Note: Naze ka Shousuke consists of two series. The original, Naze ka Shousuke is collected in 29 volumes. Its sequel, Dakara Shousuke (だから笑介) is collected in 22 volumes.)	570	Naze ka Shousuke (だから笑介)	Hideo Hijiri	Big Comic Spirits (weekly), Big Comic Superior (semimonthly); Shogakukan	October 30, 1982; March 1, 1984	April 2000; June 30, 2000
155	51	459	4P Tanaka-kun (4P田中くん)	Tarō Nami, Sanbanchi Kawa	Weekly Shōnen Champion (weekly); Akita Shoten	July 4, 1986; December 1, 1986	May 23, 1996; August 1, 1996
156	51 (Note: Yankee Reppuu-tai consists of two series. The original, Yankee Reppuu-tai (ヤンキー烈風隊) is collected in 28 volumes and its sequel, Shin Yankee Reppuu-tai (新ヤンキー烈風隊), is collected in 23 volumes.)		Yankee Reppuu-tai (ヤンキー烈風隊)	Masahide Motohashi	Monthly Shōnen Magazine; Kodansha; Young Teioh (monthly); Bunkasha	August 6, 1986; January 12, 1987	1998; December 1, 1998
157	51 (Note: Shana ou Yoshitsune series consists of two series. The original, Shana ou Yoshitsune (遮那王義経), is collected in 22 volumes consisting of 78 chapters. The sequel, Shana ou Yoshitsune: Genpei no Kassen (遮那王義経 源平の合戦), is collected in 29 volumes consisting of 93 chapters.)	171	Shana ou Yoshitsune (遮那王義経)	Hirofumi Sawada	Monthly Shōnen Magazine (monthly); Kodansha	December 6, 2000; March 14, 2001	April 6, 2015; June 17, 2015
158	50		Bonobono (ぼのぼの)	Mikio Igarashi	Manga Club, Manga Life, Manga Life Original (monthly); Takeshobo	March 1986; March 20, 1987	Ongoing
159	50	503 (Note: Chapters as of volume 50.)	Battle Studies (バトルスタディーズ)	Nakibokuro	Morning (weekly); Kodansha	January 8, 2015; April 23, 2015	Ongoing
160	50	454	750 Rider (750ライダー)	Isami Ishii	Weekly Shōnen Champion (weekly); Akita Shoten	September 11, 1975; February 28, 1976	January 17, 1985; May 1, 1985
161	50 (Note: Hōchō Mushuku consists of two series. The original Hōchō Mushuku manga is collected in 45 volumes, and its sequel, Shin Hōchō Mushuku (新包丁無宿), is collected in 5 volumes.)	337	Hōchō Mushuku (包丁無宿)	Yasuyuki Tagawa	Weekly Manga Goraku (weekly); Nihon Bungeisha	1982; September 1982	1998; August 1998
162	50	562	Kirin (キリン)	Shohei Harumoto	Master Bike BG (monthly); Young King (semimonthly); Shōnen Gahōsha	1987; September 26, 1990	June 27, 2016; July 25, 2016
163	50	1,126	Crayon Shin-chan (クレヨンしんちゃん)	Yoshito Usui	Manga Action (weekly), Manga Town (monthly); Futabasha	August 1990; April 11, 1992	February 5, 2010; July 10, 2010

== See also ==
- List of anime franchises by episode count
- List of anime series by episode count
