= List of Kaze no Daichi chapters =

The Japanese manga series Kaze no Daichi is written by Nobuhiro Sakata and illustrated by Eiji Kazama. It has been serialized in the seinen manga magazine Big Comic Original by Shogakukan since 1990. The series follows the story Keisuke Okita, who takes up golf at the age of 24 and through talent, hard work, and good coaching quickly turns into a pro. The chapters have been collected in 84 tankōbon and are released by Shogakukan. The first volume of Kaze no Daichi was released on March 30, 1991. As of September 30, 2021, eighty-one volumes have been released.

== Volume list ==
No.	Release date	ISBN
1	March 30, 1991	4-09-182461-7
001. Okurete Kita Kenjuusei (遅れてきた研修生); 002. Kouun no Inu (幸運の犬); 003. (100ヤードの壁); 004. Renshuu Raundo (練習ラウンド); 005. Haru no Kaze (春の風); 006. Yume ni Mukatte Hashire (夢に向かって走れ); 007. Yume no Atosaki (夢のあとさき); 008. Deai (出会い); 009. Seichou (成長)
2	July 30, 1991	4-09-182462-5
010. Tama no Omosa (球の重さ); 011. (イップス); 012. Kamisama no Raundo (神様とのラウンド); 013. Kenshuukai (研修会・); 014. Kenshuukai (研修会・); 015. Kenshuukai (研修会・); 016. Kenshuukai (研修会・); 017. Kenshuukai (研修会・); 018. Kenshuukai (研修会・)
3	November 30, 1991	4-09-182463-3
4	July 30, 1992	4-09-182464-1
5	December 19, 1992	4-09-182465-X
6	May 29, 1993	4-09-182466-8
7	October 29, 1993	4-09-182467-6
8	March 30, 1994	4-09-182468-4
9	July 30, 1994	4-09-182469-2
10	January 30, 1995	4-09-182470-6
11	July 29, 1995	4-09-183681-X
12	December 19, 1995	4-09-183682-8
13	May 30, 1996	4-09-183683-6
14	September 30, 1996	4-09-183684-4
15	December 19, 1996	4-09-183685-2
16	April 30, 1997	4-09-183686-0
17	August 30, 1997	4-09-183687-9
18	December 19, 1997	4-09-183688-7
19	February 26, 1998	4-09-183689-5
20	July 30, 1998	4-09-183690-9
21	November 30, 1998	4-09-185211-4
22	May 29, 1999	4-09-185212-2
23	September 30, 1999	4-09-185213-0
24	March 30, 2000	4-09-185214-9
25	June 30, 2000	4-09-185215-7
26	November 30, 2000	4-09-185216-5
27	April 26, 2001	4-09-185217-3
28	September 29, 2001	4-09-185218-1
29	January 30, 2002	4-09-185219-X
30	April 26, 2002	4-09-185220-3
31	July 30, 2002	4-09-186531-3
32	February 28, 2003	4-09-186532-1
33	June 30, 2003	4-09-186533-X
34	September 30, 2003	4-09-186534-8
35	February 28, 2004	4-09-186535-6
36	September 30, 2004	4-09-186536-4
37	February 28, 2005	4-09-186537-2
38	June 30, 2005	4-09-186538-0
39	September 30, 2005	4-09-186539-9
40	December 26, 2005	4-09-186540-2
41	May 30, 2006	4-09-180388-1
42	September 29, 2006	4-09-180744-5
43	February 28, 2007	978-4-09-181096-0
44	July 30, 2007	978-4-09-181384-8
45	December 26, 2007	978-4-09-181578-1
46	April 26, 2008	978-4-09-181889-8
47	August 29, 2008	978-4-09-182139-3
48	November 28, 2008	978-4-09-182247-5
49	April 30, 2009	978-4-09-182489-9
50	September 30, 2009	978-4-09-182627-5
51	March 30, 2010	978-4-09-183095-1
52	August 30, 2010	978-4-09-183390-7
53	March 30, 2011	978-4-09-183727-1
54	July 29, 2011	978-4-09-184015-8
55	December 27, 2011	978-4-09-184200-8
56	March 30, 2012	978-4-09-184308-1
57	July 30, 2012	978-4-09-184516-0
58	November 30, 2012	978-4-09-184784-3
59	March 29, 2013	978-4-09-185067-6
60	September 30, 2013	978-4-09-185427-8
61	December 27, 2013	978-4-09-185713-2
62	May 30, 2014	978-4-09-186223-5
63	October 30, 2014	978-4-09-186578-6
64	April 30, 2015	978-4-09-186898-5
65	September 30, 2015	978-4-09-187239-5
66	December 28, 2015	978-4-09-187547-1
67	April 28, 2016	978-4-09-187603-4
68	September 30, 2016	978-4-09-187794-9
69	April 28, 2017	978-4-09-189420-5
70	October 30, 2017	978-4-09-189729-9
71	March 30, 2018	978-4-09-189827-2
72	August 30, 2018	978-4-09-860072-4
73	November 30, 2018	978-4-09-860141-7
74	March 29, 2019	978-4-09-860251-3
75	August 30, 2019	978-4-09-860391-6
76	October 30, 2019	978-4-09-860452-4
77	April 27, 2020	978-4-09-860606-1
78	July 30, 2020	978-4-09-860688-7
79	November 30, 2020	978-4-09-860775-4
80	April 30, 2021	978-4-09-861033-4
81	September 30, 2021	978-4-09-861154-6
