= List of Q.E.D. chapters =

Written and illustrated by Motohiro Katou, Q.E.D. started in Kodansha's shōnen manga magazine Magazine Great's July 1997 issue. Magazine Great was rebranded as Magazine E-no on April 20, 2009, and the series ran in the magazine until it ceased publication on June 22, 2011. The series was transferred to the then brand new magazine Monthly Shōnen Magazine+ on October 20, 2011, until the magazine ceased publication on February 20, 2014. Kodansha collected its chapters in fifty tankōbon volumes, released from December 16, 1998, to February 17, 2015.

A sequel, titled Q.E.D. iff –Shōmei Shūryō– (Q.E.D. iff –証明終了–), started in Shōnen Magazine R on April 20, 2015. Shōnen Magazine R ceased publication on January 20, 2023, and the series was transferred to the online manga platform Getsu Maga Kichi on February 14 of the same year. It finished on February 11, 2025. Kodansha collected its chapters in 30 tankōbon volumes, released from June 17, 2015, to April 16, 2025.

A third series, titled Q.E.D. Univ. –Shōmei Shūryō– (Q.E.D. UNIV.－証明終了－), started on Getsu Maga Kichi on March 4, 2025. The first tankōbon volume was released on August 12, 2025. As of August 17, 2026, four volumes have been released.

== Q.E.D. ==
No.	Japanese release date	Japanese ISBN
1	December 16, 1998	978-4-06-333659-7
1. "The Owl of Minerva" (ミネルヴァの梟（ふくろう）, Mineruva no Fukurō); 2. "The Silver Eye" (銀の瞳, Gin no Hitomi)
2	January 14, 1999	978-4-06-333664-1
3. "Rokubu's Treasure" (六部の宝, Rokubu no Takara); 4. "Lost Royale" (ロスト・ロワイヤル, Rosuto Rowaiyaru)
3	May 17, 1999	978-4-06-333679-5
5. "Breakthrough" (ブレイク・スルー, Bureiku Surū); 6. "The Fading of Star Map" (褪（あ）せた星図, Aseta Seizu)
4	September 16, 1999	978-4-06-333696-2
7. "1st, April, 1999"; 8. "Jacob's Ladder" (ヤコブの階段, Yakobu no Kaidan)
5	December 15, 1999	978-4-06-333706-8
9. "The Distorted Melody" (歪（ひず）んだ旋律, Hizunda Senritsu); 10. "The Afterimage of Light" (光の残像, Hikari no Zanzō)
6	April 14, 2000	978-4-06-333722-8
11. "Uncertain Memories" (ワタシノキオク, Watashi no Kioku); 12. "Secret Blue Room" (青の密室, Ao no Misshitsu)
7	August 10, 2000	978-4-06-333734-1
13. "Serial John Doe"; 14. "A Melancholy Afternoon" (憂鬱な午後, Yūutsu na Gogo)
8	December 15, 2000	978-4-06-333750-1
15. "Falling Down" (フォーリング・ダウン, Fōringu Daun); 16. "School Festival Melody Mania" (学園祭狂騒曲, Gakuen-sai Kyōsōkyoku)
9	March 16, 2001	978-4-06-333760-0
17. "The Rules of the Game" (ゲームの規則, Gēmu no Kisoku); 18. "The Frozen Hammer" (凍てつく鉄槌（てっつい）, Itetsuku Tettsui)
10	July 17, 2001	978-4-06-333775-4
19. "In the Hand of the Witch" (魔女の手の中に, Majo no Te no Naka ni)
11	November 16, 2001	978-4-06-333796-9
20. "Sea of Refuge" (寄る辺の海, Yorube no Umi); 21. "Winter Zoo" (冬の動物園, Fuyu no Dōbutsuen)
12	April 17, 2002	978-4-06-333819-5
22. "In the Corner of the Galaxy" (銀河の片隅にて, Ginga no Katasumi nite); 23. "Rainbow Mirror" (虹の鏡, Niji no Kagami)
13	September 17, 2002	978-4-06-333843-0
24. "Calamity Man" (厄災の男, Yakusai no Otoko); 25. "Klein Tower" (クラインの塔, Kurain no Tō)
14	January 17, 2003	978-4-06-333859-1
26. "Summer Vacation Case" (夏休み事件, Natsuyasumi Jiken); 27. "Irregular Bound" (イレギュラーバウンド, Ireguyaru Baundo)
15	May 16, 2003	978-4-06-333882-9
28. "Glass Room" (ガラスの部屋, Garasu no Heya); 29. "Dedekind Cut" (デデキントの切断, Dedekinto no Setsudan)
16	September 17, 2003	978-4-06-333901-7
30. "Sakura Sakura" (サクラ サクラ, Sakura Sakura); 31. "A Corpse's Tears" (死者の涙, Shisha no Namida)
17	February 17, 2004	978-4-06-333922-2
32. "Disaster of a Disastrous Man" (災厄の男の災厄, Yakusai no Otoko no Yakusai); 33. "Black Nightshade" (いぬほおずき, Inuhoozuki)
18	June 17, 2004	978-4-06-333938-3
34. "Arrival of the Famous Detective(s)!" (名探偵"達"登場！, Meitantei "Tachi" Tōjō!); 35. "Three Birds" (3羽の鳥, Sanwa no Tori)
19	October 15, 2004	978-4-06-370956-8
36. "The Ghost of Macbeth" (マクベスの亡霊, Makubesu no Bōrei); 37. "The Legacy of the Sage" (賢者の遺産, Kenja no Isan)
20	February 17, 2005	978-4-06-370972-8
38. "Infinite Moon" (無限の月, Mugen no Tsuki); 39. "The Busy Ms. Enari" (多忙な江成さん, Tabō na Enari-san)
21	June 17, 2005	978-4-06-370993-3
40. "Joined Threads" (接がれた紐, Tsugareta Himo); 41. "The Beautiful Actress Being Watched, the Fear of the Stalker, the Gunshot Reverberating Off The Cliff Face, What Touma And Kana Saw" (狙われた美人女優、ストーカーの恐怖 絶壁の断崖にこだまする銃声 燈馬と可奈はずっと見ていた, Nerawareta Bijin Joyū, Sutōkā no Kyōfu Zeppeki no Dangai ni Kodamasuru Jūsei Tōma to Kana wa Zutto Miteita)
22	October 17, 2005	978-4-06-371011-3
42. "Spring in the Small River" (春の小川, Haru no Ogawa); 43. "Venetian Labyrinth" (ベネチアン迷宮, Beneshian Meikyū)
23	March 17, 2006	978-4-06-371026-7
44. "The Liar" (ライアー, Raiā); 45. "Another World" (アナザー・ワールド, Anazā Wārudo)
24	May 17, 2006	978-4-06-371043-4
46. "Christmas Eve Eve" (クリスマスイブイブ, Kurisumasu Ibu Ibu); 47. "Crime and Punishment" (罪と罰, Tsumi to Batsu)
25	September 15, 2006	978-4-06-371059-5
48. "Outer Space Battle" (宇宙大戦争, Uchū Daisensō); 49. "Parallel" (パラレル, Parareru)
26	February 16, 2007	978-4-06-371077-9
50. "Summer Time Capsule" (夏のタイムカプセル, Natsu no Taimu Kapuseru); 51. "Accomplice" (共犯者, Kyōhansha)
27	July 17, 2007	978-4-06-371099-1
52. "Mirror Image" (鏡像, Kyōzō); 53. "Burden of Proof" (立証責任, Risshō Sekinin)
28	September 14, 2007	978-4-06-371109-7
54. "Pharaoh's Necklace" (ファラオの首飾り, Farao no Kubikazari); 55. "Human Firework" (人間花火, Ningen Hanabi)
29	February 15, 2008	978-4-06-371131-8
56. "Elephant" (エレファント, Erefanto); 57. "Motive And Alibi" (動機とアリバイ, Dōki to Aribai)
30	June 17, 2008	978-4-06-371149-3
58. "Doll Killer" (人形殺人, Ningyō Satsujin); 59. "Dog Bowl" (犬の茶碗, Inu no Chawan)
31	October 17, 2008	978-4-06-371164-6
60. "The Devil in the Eyes" (眼の中の悪魔, Me no Naka no Akuma); 61. "Promise" (約束, Yakusoku)
32	January 16, 2009	978-4-06-371177-6
62. "Magic & Magic" (マジック&マジック, Majikku & Majikku); 63. "Red File" (レッド・ファイル, Reddo Fairu); 63.5 "The Drama Murder Case"
33	June 17, 2009	978-4-06-371196-7
64. "Paradox Room" (パラドックスの部屋, Paradokkusu no Heya); 65. "The Detective Novelist Murder Case" (推理小説家殺人事件, Suiri Shōsetsuka Satsujin Jiken)
34	October 16, 2002	978-4-06-371209-4
66. "Disaster Man's Wedding" (災厄の男の結婚, Yakusai no Otoko no Kekkon); 67. "Bonaridou" (母也堂, Bonaridō)
35	February 17, 2010	978-4-06-371226-1
68. "Two Suspects" (二人の容疑者, Futari no Yōgisha); 69. "Christmas Present" (クリスマス・プレゼント, Kurisumasu Purezento)
36	June 17, 2010	978-4-06-371245-2
70. "Kurogane Villa Murder Case" (黒金邸殺人事件, Kurogane-tei Satsujin Jiken); 71. "Q & A"
37	October 15, 2010	978-4-06-371255-1
72. "Murder Lecture" (殺人講義, Satsujin Kōgi); 73. "Anima" (アニマ, Anima)
38	February 17, 2011	978-4-06-371270-4
74. "Empty Dream" (虚夢, Kyomu); 75. "17" (十七, Jū Nana)
39	June 17, 2011	978-4-06-371286-5
76. "The Incident in Urban Hills Room #6" (ああばんひるず6号室事件, Āban Hiruzu Roku-gōshitsu Jiken); 77. "Grand Tour" (グランドツアー, Gurando Tsuā)
40	October 17, 2002	978-4-06-371302-2
78. "Love Square" (四角関係, Shikaku Kankei); 79. "Secret Room No. 4" (密室 No.4, Misshitsu Nanbā Fō)
41	February 17, 2012	978-4-06-371318-3
80. "Special Envoy of Balkia" (バルキアの特使, Barukia no Tokushi); 81. "Caff's Memories" (カフの追憶, Kafu no Tsuioku)
42	June 15, 2012	978-4-06-371330-5
82. "Escher Hotel" (エッシャーホテル, Esshā Hoteru); 83. "Logic Tower" (論理の塔, Ronri no Tō)
43	October 17, 2002	978-4-06-371346-6
84. "Investigation" (検証, Kenshō); 85. "Ginger The Salesman" (ジンジャーのセールス, Jinjā no Sērusu)
44	February 15, 2013	978-4-06-371361-9
86. "Tuba and Grave" (チューバと墓, Chūba to Haka); 87. "Question!"
45	June 17, 2013	978-4-06-371376-3
88. "Venus" (金星, Kinsei); 89. "First Love" (初恋, Hatsukoi)}
46	October 17, 2013	978-4-06-371390-9
90. "Broken Heart" (失恋, Shitsuren); 91. "Pilgrimage" (巡礼, Junrei)
47	February 17, 2014	978-4-06-371406-7
92. "The Sun Is Still Blazing" (陽はまだ高い, Hi wa Mada Takai); 93. "The Slope" (坂道, Sakamichi)
48	June 17, 2014	978-4-06-371422-7
94. "The Representative" (代理人, Dairinin); 95. "Fahya's Drawing Book" (ファイハの画集, Faiha no Gashū)
49	October 17, 2014	978-4-06-371438-8
96. "Unrelated Cases" (無関係な事件, Mukankei na Jiken); 97. "Love Story" (ラブストーリー, Rabu Sutōrī)
50	February 17, 2015	978-4-06-371457-9
98. "Observation" (観測, Kansoku); 99. "Escape" (脱出, Dasshutsu)

== Q.E.D. iff ==
No.	Japanese release date	Japanese ISBN
1	June 17, 2015	978-4-06-371475-3
1. Iff; 2. In The Year Of Quantum Mechanics (量子力学の年に, Ryōshi Rikigaku no Toshi ni)
2	October 16, 2015	978-4-06-371488-3
3. "The Emperor's New Clothes" (素っ裸の王様, Suppadaka no Ōsama); 4. "The Shape of Murder" (殺人のかたち, Satsujin no Katachi)
3	February 17, 2016	978-4-06-392507-4
5. "Three Killers" (三人の刺客, Sannin no Shikaku); 6. "The Bike Thief" (自転車泥棒, Jitensha Dorobō)
4	June 17, 2016	978-4-06-392527-2
7. "The Jade Miko" (碧の巫女, Midori no Miko); 8. H.N. (Handle Name)
5	October 17, 2016	978-4-06-392547-0
9. "Even" (イーブン, Ībun); 10. "The Imperfect Locked Room" (不完全な密室, Fukanzen na Misshitsu)
6	February 17, 2017	978-4-06-392564-7
11. "The Man Who Claimed To Land On The Earth" (地球に落ちてきたと言っている男, Chikyū ni Ochite Kita to Itteiru Otoko); 12. "Sudden Change" (急転, Kyūten)
7	June 16, 2017	978-4-06-392584-5
13. "Ramanujan Beyond The Rainbow" (虹の彼方のラマヌジャン, Niji no Kanata no Ramanujan); 14. "A Certain Showman" (ある興行師, Aru Kōgyōshi)
8	October 17, 2017	978-4-06-392605-7
15. "Eyewitness By The Seaside" (海辺の目撃者, Umibe no Mokugekisha); 16. "White Crow" (白いカラス, Shiroi Karasu)
9	February 16, 2018	978-4-06-510926-7
17. "Ghostly Fire" (陰火, Inka); 18. "Beautiful Painting" (美しい絵, Utsukushii E)
10	June 15, 2018	978-4-06-511707-1
19. "Outlaws" (アウトローズ, Autorōzu); 20. "Dying Message" (ダイイングメッセージ, Daingu Messēji)
11	October 17, 2018	978-4-06-513175-6
21. "The Unreliable Witness" (信頼できない語り手, Shinrai Dekinai Katarite); 22. "The Drowning Bird" (溺れる鳥, Oboreru Tori)
12	February 15, 2019	978-4-06-514622-4
23. "A Good Man" (いい奴, Ii Yatsu); 24. "A Moment of Regeneration" (再生の時, Saisei no Toki)
13	June 17, 2019	978-4-06-516095-4
25. "Crime Scene" (殺人風景, Satsujin Fūkei); 26. "The Singular Woman" (特異点の女, Tokuiten no Onna)
14	October 17, 2019	978-4-06-517371-8
27. "The Man Travelling With 100 Million Yen" (1億円と旅する男, Ichi Oku En to Tabi Suru Otoko); 28. "Memory" (メモリ, Memori)
15	February 17, 2020	978-4-06-518542-1
29. "That World" (その世界, Sono Sekai); 30. "Something A Human Still Cannot See" (人がまだ見ることができない, Hito ga Mada Miru Koto ga Dekinai)
16	June 17, 2020	978-4-06-519683-0
31. "Clock Tower" (時計塔, Tokeitō); 32. "Mademoiselle Clouseau" (マドモアゼル・クルーゾー, Madomowazeru Kurūzō)
17	October 16, 2020	978-4-06-521040-6
33. "The Poplar House Murder Game" (ポプラ荘の殺人ゲーム, Popura-sō no Satsujin Gēmu); 34. "Trolley Problem" (トロッコ問題, Torokko Mondai)
18	February 17, 2021	978-4-06-522360-4
35. "House of the Dead" (精霊の家, Seirei no Ie); 36. "School Festival Suite" (学園祭組曲, Gakuen-sai Kumikyoku)
19	June 17, 2021	978-4-06-523729-8
37. "Doppelganger" (ドッペルゲンガー, Dopperugengā); 38. "Spring Wind" (春の風, Haru no Kaze)
20	October 15, 2021	978-4-06-524888-1
39. "Fact" (ファクト, Fakuto); 40. "Fraud Artist" (贋作画家, Gansaku Gaka)
21	February 17, 2022	978-4-06-527004-2
41. "Diophantine Equations" (ディオファントスの方程式, Diofantosu no Hōteishiki); 42. "Post-Mortem Letter" (死後の手紙, Shigo no Tegami)
22	July 15, 2022	978-4-06-528126-0
43. "Thievery, Corruption, and Murder" (盗難、収賄そして殺人, Tōnan, Shūwai Soshite Satsujin); 44. "Other People's Way Of Life" (他人の生活, Tanin no Seikatsu)
23	November 16, 2022	978-4-06-529965-4
45. "Assimilation" (同化, Dōka); 46. "Legal Realism" (形式的 真実, Keishikiteki Shinjitsu)
24	March 16, 2023	978-4-06-531294-0
47. "Ball Games and Nash Equilibrium" (ナッシュ均衡と球技大会, Nasshu Kinkō to Kyūgi Taikai); 48. "Seven Facts" (七つの事実, Nanatsu no Jijitsu)
25	July 14, 2023	978-4-06-532256-7
49. Dai Yon no Gēto (第4のゲート); 50. Kantan na Kotae (簡単な答え)
26	November 16, 2023	978-4-06-533716-5
51. Kuroi Seibo-zō (黒い聖母像); 52. Monti Hōru Mondai (モンティ・ホール問題)
27	April 17, 2024	978-4-06-535041-6
53. Dōru Hausu no Satsujin Jiken (ドールハウスの殺人事件); 54. Rinji Tokubetsu Shindai Ressha Jiken (臨時特別寝台列車事件)
28	August 16, 2024	978-4-06-536247-1
55. Kōun (幸運); 56. Ronten Seiri (論点整理)
29	December 17, 2024	978-4-06-537750-5
57. Hane ga Nakute mo (羽がなくても); 58. Essei (エッセイ)
30	April 16, 2024	978-4-06-538829-7
59. Puresutēji (プレステージ); 60. Doa ga Shimaru Toki (ドアが閉まる時)

== Q.E.D. Univ. ==
No.	Japanese release date	Japanese ISBN
1	August 12, 2025	978-4-06-540383-9
1. Beginning of the UNIV.; 2. "Roots" (ルーツ, Rūtsu)
2	December 17, 2025	978-4-06-541598-6
3	April 16, 2026	978-4-06-542981-5
4	August 17, 2026	978-4-06-544293-7

=== Chapters not yet in tankōbon format ===
- 3. Mizube no Uma (水辺の馬)
