= List of Hajime no Ippo manga volumes =

First tankōbon volume cover, released by Kodansha on February 17, 1990

Hajime no Ippo (はじめの一歩; lit. 'The First Step') is a Japanese boxing manga series written and illustrated by George Morikawa. It has been serialized by Kodansha in Weekly Shōnen Magazine since 1989 and collected in over 145 tankōbon to date. It follows the story of high school student Makunouchi Ippo, as he begins his career in boxing and over time obtains many titles and defeats various opponents.

The manga currently has more than 140 tankōbon volumes published in Japan by Kodansha. The first manga volume released on February 17, 1990, and the 145th on January 16, 2026.

== List ==
=== Volumes 1–20 ===
No.	Japanese release date	Japanese ISBN
1	February 17, 1990	978-4-06-311532-1
2	March 17, 1990	978-4-06-311543-7
3	May 17, 1990	978-4-06-311566-6
4	August 17, 1990	978-4-06-311591-8
5	October 17, 1990	978-4-06-311608-3
6	December 14, 1990	978-4-06-311625-0
7	February 16, 1991	978-4-06-311641-0
8	April 17, 1991	978-4-06-311658-8
9	July 17, 1991	978-4-06-311690-8
10	September 17, 1991	978-4-06-311708-0
11	December 13, 1991	978-4-06-311730-1
12	February 17, 1992	978-4-06-311754-7
13	May 16, 1992	978-4-06-311783-7
14	August 8, 1992	978-4-06-311814-8
15	October 17, 1992	978-4-06-311830-8
16	December 14, 1992	978-4-06-311851-3
17	March 17, 1993	978-4-06-311881-0
18	June 17, 1993	978-4-06-311909-1
19	August 17, 1993	978-4-06-311927-5
20	November 17, 1993	978-4-06-311956-5

=== Volumes 21–40 ===
No.	Japanese release date	Japanese ISBN
21	January 17, 1994	978-4-06-311975-6
22	March 17, 1994	978-4-06-311994-7
23	June 17, 1994	978-4-06-312025-7
24	August 17, 1994	978-4-06-312041-7
25	November 17, 1994	978-4-06-312068-4
26	January 17, 1995	978-4-06-312090-5
27	March 17, 1995	978-4-06-312112-4
28	May 17, 1995	978-4-06-312135-3
29	August 17, 1995	978-4-06-312165-0
30	November 16, 1995	978-4-06-312197-1
31	January 17, 1996	978-4-06-312219-0
32	March 16, 1996	978-4-06-312241-1
33	May 16, 1996	978-4-06-312265-7
34	August 12, 1996	978-4-06-312299-2
35	October 17, 1996	978-4-06-312325-8
36	January 17, 1997	978-4-06-312361-6
37	April 17, 1997	978-4-06-312390-6
38	June 17, 1997	978-4-06-312417-0
39	August 12, 1997	978-4-06-312439-2
40	November 17, 1997	978-4-06-312475-0

=== Volumes 41–60 ===
No.	Japanese release date	Japanese ISBN
41	February 17, 1998	978-4-06-312509-2
42	April 17, 1998	978-4-06-312532-0
43	June 17, 1998	978-4-06-312556-6
44	August 17, 1998	978-4-06-312578-8
45	November 17, 1998	978-4-06-312616-7
46	January 14, 1999	978-4-06-312640-2
47	April 16, 1999	978-4-06-312673-0
48	June 17, 1999	978-4-06-312697-6
49	August 17, 1999	978-4-06-312723-2
50	October 15, 1999	978-4-06-312744-7
51	February 17, 2000	978-4-06-312799-7
52	May 17, 2000	978-4-06-312837-6
53	July 17, 2000	978-4-06-312857-4
54	September 14, 2000	978-4-06-312879-6
55	December 15, 2000	978-4-06-312911-3
56	March 16, 2001	978-4-06-312944-1
57	June 15, 2001	978-4-06-312978-6
58	September 17, 2001	978-4-06-313017-1
59	December 17, 2001	978-4-06-313051-5
60	February 15, 2002	978-4-06-313072-0

=== Volumes 61–80 ===
No.	Japanese release date	Japanese ISBN
61	17 May 2002	978-4-06-363103-6
62	17 September 2002	978-4-06-363143-2
63	17 December 2002	978-4-06-363176-0
64	17 March 2003	978-4-06-363211-8
65	17 June 2003	978-4-06-363246-0
66	17 September 2003	978-4-06-363284-2
67	17 December 2003	978-4-06-363315-3
68	16 April 2004	978-4-06-363355-9
69	15 July 2004	978-4-06-363396-2
70	17 September 2004	978-4-06-363428-0
71	17 December 2004	978-4-06-363458-7
72	17 March 2005	978-4-06-363495-2
73	17 July 2005	978-4-06-363548-5
74	16 December 2005	978-4-06-363606-2
75	17 March 2006	978-4-06-363636-9
76	16 June 2006	978-4-06-363665-9
77	17 August 2006	978-4-06-363705-2
78	17 November 2006	978-4-06-363742-7
79	16 February 2007	978-4-06-363786-1
80	17 May 2007	978-4-06-363827-1

=== Volumes 81–100 ===
No.	Japanese release date	Japanese ISBN
81	September 14, 2007	978-4-06-363881-3
82	December 17, 2007	978-4-06-363922-3
83	March 17, 2008	978-4-06-363946-9
84	June 17, 2008	978-4-06-363994-0
85	September 17, 2008	978-4-06-384033-9
86	December 17, 2008	978-4-06-384072-8
87	March 17, 2009	978-4-06-384094-0
88	June 17, 2009	978-4-06-384143-5
89	September 17, 2009	978-4-06-384180-0
90	December 17, 2009	978-4-06-384219-7
91	March 17, 2010	978-4-06-384262-3
92	June 17, 2010	978-4-06-384309-5
93	September 17, 2010	978-4-06-384360-6
94	December 17, 2010	978-4-06-384391-0
95	March 17, 2011	978-4-06-384455-9
96	June 17, 2011	978-4-06-384485-6
97	September 16, 2011	978-4-06-384548-8
98	December 16, 2011	978-4-06-384594-5
99	April 17, 2012	978-4-06-384653-9
100	July 17, 2012	978-4-06-384701-7

=== Volumes 101–120 ===
No.	Japanese release date	Japanese ISBN
101	October 17, 2012	978-4-06-384746-8
102	January 17, 2013	978-4-06-384796-3
103	May 17, 2013	978-4-06-384842-7
104	August 16, 2013	978-4-06-394906-3
105	November 15, 2013	978-4-06-394961-2
106	February 17, 2014	978-4-06-395008-3
107	June 17, 2014	978-4-06-395075-5
108	September 17, 2014	978-4-06-395185-1
109	December 17, 2014	978-4-06-395263-6
110	April 17, 2015	978-4-06-395372-5
111	September 17, 2015	978-4-06-395463-0
112	November 17, 2015	978-4-06-395570-5
113	March 17, 2016	978-4-06-395579-8
114	June 17, 2016	978-4-06-395687-0
115	September 16, 2016	978-4-06-395762-4
116	December 16, 2016	978-4-06-395832-4
117	April 17, 2017	978-4-06-395902-4
118	July 14, 2017	978-4-06-510087-5
119	November 11, 2017	978-4-06-510246-6
120	March 16, 2018	978-4-06-511076-8

=== Volumes 121–current ===
No.	Japanese release date	Japanese ISBN
121	May 17, 2018	978-4-06-511417-9
122	August 17, 2018	978-4-06-511799-6
123	November 16, 2018	978-4-06-513251-7
124	March 15, 2019	978-4-06-514127-4
125	July 17, 2019	978-4-06-515079-5
126	October 17, 2019	978-4-06-517210-0
127	February 17, 2020	978-4-06-517210-0
128	June 17, 2020	978-4-06-519177-4
129	November 17, 2020	978-4-06-521304-9
130	March 17, 2021	978-4-06-522652-0
131	June 17, 2021	978-4-06-523576-8
132	September 17, 2021	978-4-06-524835-5
133	December 17, 2021	978-4-06-526282-5
134	March 17, 2022	978-4-06-527275-6
135	July 15, 2022	978-4-06-528774-3
136	November 17, 2022	978-4-06-529638-7
137	March 16, 2023	978-4-06-530922-3
138	July 14, 2023	978-4-06-532178-2
139	November 16, 2023	978-4-06-533516-1
140	February 16, 2024	978-4-06-534556-6
141	July 17, 2024	978-4-06-536158-0
142	December 17, 2024	978-4-06-537776-5
143	April 16, 2025	978-4-06-539043-6
144	August 12, 2025	978-4-06-540364-8
145	January 16, 2026	978-4-06-542203-8
