= List of Kenichi: The Mightiest Disciple chapters =

First tankōbon volume cover, released by Shogakukan on August 9, 2002

The chapters of the Japanese manga series Kenichi: The Mightiest Disciple were written and illustrated by Syun Matsuena. The manga was serialized in Shogakukan's magazine Weekly Shōnen Sunday from April 2002 to September 2014. Its 583 chapters were collected 61 tankōbon volumes, released from August 9, 2002, to February 18, 2015. The story focuses on Kenichi Shirahama, an average 16-year-old high school student who is often bullied. After meeting a mysterious transfer student named Miu Fūrinji and following her advice to join a dojo named "Ryōzanpaku", his life begins to change.

== Volumes ==
=== Volumes 1–20 ===
No.	Release date	ISBN
01	August 9, 2002	978-4-09-126571-5
Battle 001. "The High School Girl Who Is Like An Assassin" (殺し屋気取りの女子高生, Koroshiya Kidori no Joshikōsei); Battle 002. "The Big Incident" (まずい事になった！, Mazui Koto ni Natta!); Battle 003. "Defense For Now" (まずは防御！, Masu wa Bōgyo!); Battle 004. "Hidden Meaning" (隠された意味, Kakusareta Imi); Battle 005. "From Defense To Assault" (防御から攻撃へ！, Bōgyo kara Kōgeki e!); Battle 006. "Go To That Place" (ある場所へ行け！, Aru Bajo e Ike!); Battle 007. "Ryozanpaku Dojo" (梁山泊, Ryōzanpaku)
02	October 8, 2002	978-4-09-126572-2
Battle 008. "He Becomes The Disciple" (弟子になる！, Deshi ni Naru!); Battle 009. "There's No Time!" (間に合わないんだ！, Maniawanainda!); Battle 010. "The Face I Don't Wish To See" (見せたくない顔！, Misetakunai Kao!); Battle 011. "Sakaki Sensei" (逆鬼先生！, Sakaki Sensei!); Battle 012. "The First Blow" (最初の一撃！, Saisho no Ichigeki!); Battle 013. "Weightless" (軽い！, Karui!); Battle 014. "The Fight's Inferno!" (ケンカ地獄!!, Kenka Jigoku!!); Battle 015. "Honoka's Price" (ほのかの偵察, Honoka no Teisatsu); Battle 016. "The Dream" (屋根の上の夢, Yane no Ue no Yume); Battle 017. "Get Caught In The Neighborhood!" (町内一周中にバッタリ!!, Chōnai Isshū-chū ni Battari)
03	January 18, 2003	978-4-09-126573-9
Battle 018. "Are You Just Going To Leave" (帰っちゃうの!?, Kaecchau no!?); Battle 019. "Small Seedling" (小さな芽, Chiisana Me); Battle 020. "Genius of Weaponry" (武器の申し子, Buki no Mōshigo); Battle 021. "I Stand Corrected" (訂正します。, Teiseishimasu.); Battle 022. "Pink Coloured Muscles" (ピンク色の筋肉, Pinkuiro no Kinniku); Battle 023. "Appachai's Training" (アパチャイの修行！, Apachai no Shugyō); Battle 024. "Now, Dodge!" (そこで、よけるよ！, Sokode, Yokeru yo!); Battle 025. "Sakaki's Worry" (逆鬼の心配, Sakaki no Shinpai); Battle 026. "Takeda's Scheme" (武田の策, Takeda no Saku)
04	March 18, 2003	978-4-09-126574-6
Battle 027. "In The Ring!" (リングの中で！, Ringu no Uchi de!); Battle 028. "Takeda's Past" (武田の過去, Takeda no Kako); Battle 029. "Consolation!" (上へ!!, Ue e!!); Battle 030. "The Race Track And Families" (競馬場とファミレス！, Keibajō to Fyamiresu!); Battle 031. "The Fate of Maskman" (マスクマンの運命, Masukuman no Unmei); Battle 032. "A New Opponent" (新たな敵, Aratana Tekii); Battle 033. "Freedom" (自由？, Jiyū?); Battle 034. "A New Killing Medthod" (ケンカ殺法（さっぽう）！, Kenka Sappō!); Battle 035. "An Ally Appears!" (助っ人登場！, Suketto Tōjō!)
05	June 18, 2003	978-4-09-126575-3
Battle 036. "Shady Plans" (恐ろしい計画!?, Osoroshii Keikaku!?); Battle 037. "The Plans For My Disciple" (内弟子化計画, Uchideshika Keikaku); Battle 038. "Hot Springs" (温泉...!?, Onsen...!?); Battle 039. "The Nosy Honoka" (おせっかいなほのか, Osekkaina Honoka); Battle 040. "The Search" (見つかったモノ, Mitsukatta Mono); Battle 041. "Rapid Fall In Ranking" (ランキング急降下, Rankingu Kyūkōka); Battle 042. "Aim For The Blind Spot" (手が出ない!!, Te ga Denai!!); Battle 043. "Dojo Hunting" (道場破り, Dōjō Yaburi); Battle 044. "First Disciple" (一番弟子, Ichiban Deshi)
06	August 8, 2003	978-4-09-126576-0
Battle 045. "To Furinji Island" (風林寺島へ！, Fūrinjitō e!); Battle 046. "Escape" (脱出！, Dasshutsu!); Battle 047. "Someone You Know" (知り合い？, Shiriai?); Battle 048. "8 Fist Heroes" (八拳豪); Battle 049. "Mophead Conclusion" (モジャモジャ決着！, Moja Moja Ketchaku!); Battle 050. "Skills Training" (技の修行！, Gi no Shugyō!); Battle 051. "Trace The Call!" (ぎゃくたん！, Gyakutan!); Battle 052. "Kisara's Skill" (キサラの技！, Kisara no Waza!); Battle 053. "Shinpaku Alliance!!" (新白連合!!, Shinpaku Rengō)
07	November 18, 2003	978-4-09-126577-7
Battle 054. "The Rise of Haruo" (新島台頭!?, Niijima Taitō!?); Battle 055. "House of Youkai" (妖怪屋敷, Yōkai Yashiki); Battle 056. "Juliet!" (ジュリエット!!, Jurietto!!); Battle 057. "A Flash of Melancholy" (哀しい光, Kanashii Hikari); Battle 058. "Found Out" (ばれた!?, Bareta!?); Battle 059. "Can't Pass Here!" (通さない!!, Tōsanai!!); Battle 060. "Pierro" (ピエロ!?, Piero!?); Battle 061. "Hermit's True Appearance!" (ハーミットの正体!!, Hāmitto no Shōtai!!); Battle 062. "Fist of Strength" (剛の拳, Gō no kobushi)
08	February 18, 2004	978-4-09-126578-4
Battle 063. "Mountain Training Begins!" (山修行...開始!!, Yamashugyō... Kaishi!!); Battle 064. "The Difference Is Tactics" (違いは兵法!?, Chigai wa Heihō!?); Battle 065. "The Talent of Hard Work" (努力する才能, Doryokusuru Sainō); Battle 066. "Master Ba's Motive" (馬師父の理由, Ba Shifu no Riyuu); Battle 067. "The Chinatown Conspiracy" (チャイナタウンの陰謀, Chainataun no Inbō); Battle 068. "Blood Relative" (血族, Ketsuzoku); Battle 069. "Thanks" (ありがとう, Arigatou); Battle 070. "Shinpaku Alliance Formation!" (新白連合...結成!!, Shinpaku Rengō...Kessei!!); Battle 071. "Battle of Deception" (ダマシ合戦！, Damashi Gassen!)
09	March 18, 2004	978-4-09-126579-1
Battle 072. "Niijima Vs The Zombie" (新島vsゾンビ, Niijima Vs Zombi); Battle 073. "Because He's A Bad Friend" (悪友だから...!!, Akuyū Dakara...!!); Battle 074. "Night of The Living Dead" (ナイト・オブ・リビングデッド); Battle 075. "Drink The Whole Thing" (のんじまえ!!, Nonjimae!!); Battle 076. "The-Zero Be At Attack" (無拍子の一撃！, Mubyōshi no Ichigeki!); Battle 077. "Fierce Fight Home Visit! Part 1" (激闘・家庭訪問!! 前編, Gekitō・Kateihōmon!! Zenpen); Battle 078. "Fierce Fight Home Visit! Part 2" (激闘・家庭訪問!! 後編, Gekitō・Kateihōmon!! Kōhen); Battle 079. "Until Its Worn Out!!" (すり減るまで!!, Suriheru Made!!); Battle 080. "The Face is Nice!!" (その顔、いいじょ!!, Sono Kao, Ii jo!!)
10	May 18, 2004	978-4-09-126580-7
Battle 081. "Big Brother" (お兄ちゃん, Oniichan); Battle 082. "Crash" (激突!!!, Gekitotsu!!!); Battle 083. "Akisame's Wager" (秋雨の賭！, Akisame no Kake!); Battle 084. "Hermit's Cross" (ハーミットの十字架, Hāmitto no Jūjika); Battle 085. "The Fist" (拳は語る...!!, Kobushi wa Kataru...!!); Battle 086. "Kensei" (拳聖, Kensei); Battle 087. "Take Him!!" (やっちまえ!!, Yacchimae!!); Battle 088. "Bloody Battle of Exhaustion!!" (ボロボロの血戦!!, Boro Boro no Kessen!!); Battle 089. "Path of the Hermit" (隠者の道, Inja no Michi)
11	July 16, 2004	978-4-09-127151-8
Battle 090. "The Stray Novice" (迷える入門者, Mayoeru Nyūmon); Battle 091. "The Man From Ryozampaku" ("梁山泊"の男!?, "Ryōzampaku" no Otoko!?); Battle 092. "Lets Believe in Our Masters!!" (師匠を信じましょう!!, Shishō o Shinjimashō!!); Battle 093. "My Finishing Move Is" (ボクの必殺技...!?, Boku no Hissatsuwaza...!?); Battle 094. "Miu-chan, Upset" (美羽ちゃん、おかんむり!?, Miu-chan, Okanmuri!?); Battle 095. "Fierce Fight – Triangle Relationship" (激闘・三角関係!!, Gekitō ・ Sankaku Kankei); Battle 096. "Poolside Spirit" (プールサイドの精霊); Battle 097. "Fight Skillfully" (うまく戦う...!?, Umaku Tatakau...!?); Battle 098. "Terror of the Sumo Ring" (ちゃんこの恐怖, Chanko no Kyōfu)
12	October 18, 2004	978-4-09-127152-5
Battle 099. "Pride of the Ring" (心の土俵!!); Battle 100. "Teacher vs Disciple" (師匠VS.弟子!!!); Battle 101. "See You in the Alley" (路地裏の再会); Battle 102. "Two For One" (二人と一匹); Battle 103. "Tag Me In" (ワタシの番!!); Battle 104. "Mouse Flare" (ネズミ花火!?); Battle 105. "The Owner of Yourself!" (己の主となれ!!); Battle 106. "The Old Tale of the Elder" (長老の今昔物語); Battle 107. "The Cherry Giving Giant!" (サクランボの巨人)
13	December 17, 2004	978-4-09-127153-2
Battle 108. "Fierce Battle on the High Seas!" (洋上の大激戦!!); Battle 109. "Secret Technique..." (秘技...!?); Battle 110. "Battle Plan H" (コードネーム"H（エイチ）"!!); Battle 111. "A Visit from Father!" (父、来たる!!); Battle 112. "A Father's Punch" (親父のコブシ!!); Battle 113. "Days of Peace" (穏やかな日々); Battle 114. "Meeting Place" (約束の地); Battle 115. "True Strength Revealed!" (威を振るう龍); Battle 116. "Seikuken" (制空圏)
14	February 18, 2005	978-4-09-127154-9
Battle 117. "Elder in Action!" (長老、立つ!!); Battle 118. "Hunger Strikes" (お腹ペコペコ); Battle 119. "Outdoor Survival at its Worst" (毒2サバイバル!!); Battle 120. (出没注意!!); Battle 121. "The Limiter" (リミッター); Battle 122. "Escape From Death" (ニアミス！); Battle 123. "Party...Heaven and Earth" (パーティー...天と地と。); Battle 124. "The Hunt for Shinpaku Begins" (新白狩り); Battle 125. "Run Away Niijima" (新島、走る!!)
15	April 18, 2005	978-4-09-127155-6
Battle 126. "Requiem" (鎮魂歌（レクイエム）); Battle 127. "That Guy's Ideals!" (アイツの信念!!); Battle 128. "Dance...Kisara!" (キサラ...舞う!!); Battle 129. "Nijima's Will" (新島の決意!!); Battle 130. "Revolution" (革命（レボリューション）...!?); Battle 131. "Quick Turn for the Worse" (戦闘配置!!); Battle 132. "Battle Places!" (急転直下!!); Battle 133. "Excitement and Stubbornness" (スリルと執念); Battle 134. "Exterminating Evil" (妖怪退治)
16	June 16, 2005	978-4-09-127156-3
Battle 135. "Battle of the Aces" (大将戦...!!); Battle 136. "The One Who Deceives" (偽善者...); Battle 137. "The Invisible Spear" (見透す槍); Battle 138. "Meeting" (出会い...); Battle 139. "Nice Dodge, Kenichi!" (閃きの兼一!!); Battle 140. "Ryozanpaku's Rhythm" (リズム梁山泊); Battle 141. "That Day" (あの日...); Battle 142. "It's Time" (時間切れ); Battle 143. "Result of the Promise" (約束の果て)
17	August 8, 2005	978-4-09-127157-0
Battle 144. "One's Own Strength" (自分の強さ); Battle 145. "Business" (ビジネス); Battle 146. "Assassin of Beauty" (麗しの暗殺者); Battle 147. "Master Train" (達人トレイン!!); Battle 148. "Battle of the Twin Towers" (ツインタワーの攻防); Battle 149. "Interesting Disciple" (面白い弟子); Battle 150. "Well Then, Let's Do Our Best" (それでよし！); Battle 151. "Gentle Legend" (優しき伝説); Battle 152. "Shigure's Reasons" (しぐれの事情)
18	November 18, 2005	978-4-09-127158-7
Battle 153. "Hitogiri Bouchou" (人斬り包丁); Battle 154. "He is Awkward" (不器用なり...); Battle 155. "As a Father" (父として...); Battle 156. "Your Name Is" (君の名は...); Battle 157. "The Flower within Yami" (闇の中の花); Battle 158. "Meeting Again" (再見（サイツェン）...!!); Battle 159. "The Fight's Presence" (戦いの気配); Battle 160. "The Assassin's Power" (刺客の実力!!); Battle 161. "The Disciple's Arrival" (弟子...来たる!!)
19	January 18, 2006	978-4-09-120048-8
Battle 162. "Ghostly Attack" (変化攻撃!!); Battle 163. "The Battle's Stance" (闘いのスタンス); Battle 164. "The Flower Garden's Tears" (花園の涙); Battle 165. "The-Master Missile" (達人ミサイル!!!); Battle 166. "A Master and a Father" (師父...そして父); Battle 167. "The Nine Shadow Fists" (一影九挙); Battle 168. "Worrying Youngsters" (悩め若者!!); Battle 169. "Step into the Darkness" (暗闇に踏み出せ!!); Battle 170. "A Special Day" (特別な日)
20	April 18, 2006	978-4-09-120348-9
Battle 171. "Found Wings" (翼を見つけた); Battle 172. "Don't Go!!" (行かないで!!); Battle 173. "God of Destruction Lives Under a Bridge" (ガード下の破壊神); Battle 174. "The Gong of a Battle" (戦いのゴング); Battle 175. "Soldier of Darkness" (闇のソルジャー); Battle 176. "Perfect Mission" (パーフェクトミッション); Battle 177. "Master Trap" (達人トラップ); Battle 178. "The Battlefield is Ryouzanpaku" (戦場は梁山泊！); Battle 179. "Impossible Analysis" (分析不可能!!)

=== Volumes 21–40 ===
No.	Release date	ISBN
21	July 18, 2006	978-4-09-120437-0
Battle 180. "All Out War" (全面戦争); Battle 181. "The Lure on Top of the Snow" (雪上の誘惑); Battle 182. "Desperate Fight on Snow" (デスペレイト ファイト オン スノー); Battle 183. "The King of the Snow Field" (雪原の王); Battle 184. "The Declaration in the Blizzard" (吹雪の宣言!!); Battle 185. "Determination to Fight to the Death" (死闘の覚悟); Battle 186. "The Night of Revolution" (革命前夜); Battle 187. "The Will of the King" (王者の意地); Battle 188. "Tragic Disciple" (悲劇の弟子)
22	October 4, 2006	978-4-09-120625-1
Battle 189. "Who is Number 1" (誰が一番...!?); Battle 190. "Proof of Strength" (強さの証明); Battle 191. "Master Children" (達人チルドレン); Battle 192. "Everyone's Here" (みんながいる。); Battle 193. "Things I Am Capable Of" (ボクにできること); Battle 194. "Knives Swords And My Fists" (銃とナイフと僕の拳); Battle 195. "Diamond And Clay" (ダイヤと土塊); Battle 196. "Invitation Letter" (招待状); Battle 197. "Meaning of An Adventure" (冒険の正体)
23	December 16, 2006	978-4-09-120699-2
Battle 198. "Cross the Line" (一線を越えろ!!); Battle 199. "Paradise" (楽園); Battle 200. "Shinpaku Alliance Taking Control" (新白連合...制圧!?); Battle 201. "Night of Determination" (決意の夜); Battle 202. "Continued Battle" (緒戦); Battle 203. "The Will of Defeat" (敗北の意地); Battle 204. "Takeda, Jump!" (武田、跳ねる!!); Battle 205. "Fight to the Death" (死んでも負けるな！); Battle 206. "Fierce Butterfly" (鋭き蝶); Battle 207. "Lightning Lady" (ラストニング・レディー)
24	March 16, 2007	978-4-09-121022-7
Battle 208. "Courage Controlling Technique" (勇気のコントロール); Battle 209. "I Am The Super Teenager!" (超人青年じゃ!!); Battle 210. "The 3 Greatest Martial Arts" (中国三大武術!!); Battle 211. "A Different Battle to the Death" (もう一つの死闘); Battle 212. "The True Meaning of 2 vs 3!" (2対3の真実); Battle 213. "The Power of Friendship" (友という力); Battle 214. "Fierce Taichi" (壮絶・太極拳!!); Battle 215. "Flowing Water Head Butt" (流水頭撃); Battle 216. "Secret Move of Hatred" (怨念の秘技); Battle 217. "After Struggling Through" (あがき抜いた先に)
25	June 18, 2007	978-4-09-121076-0
Battle 218. "For the Sake of Getting Stronger" (強くなるための...); Battle 219. "The Messenger from Yami" (闇よりの使者); Battle 220. "Violet Moon" (ヴァイオレットムーン); Battle 221. "The Man of Misfortune" (THE MAN of MISFORTUNE); Battle 222. "Fallen Wings" (堕ちる羽); Battle 223. "A Fight During the Crucial Moment" (瀬戸際勝負！); Battle 224. "Each of Their Attacks" (それぞれの一撃); Battle 225. "Show Time" (ショータイム); Battle 226. "Showing Off..." (魅せられて...); Battle 227. "Bitter Memories" (苦～い思い出)
26	September 18, 2007	978-4-09-121186-6
Battle 228. "A New Deal" (新たなる契り); Battle 229. "The Appropriate Martial Arts" (適した武術); Battle 230. "The Mysterious... Hell" (謎...地獄!!!); Battle 231. "Garyuu x 2 =" (我流×2=!?); Battle 232. "Awakening from Beyond" (極限の悟り); Battle 233. "Supreme Teachings" (超伝授); Battle 234. "Result of the Sparring" (組手の果てに...); Battle 235. "Our Bond" (俺たちの絆); Battle 236. "Descend of Friendship" (友情のダイビング！); Battle 237. "Plan Failed" (作戦失敗!?)
27	December 15, 2007	978-4-09-121225-2
Battle 238. "Nirvana no Canon" (涅槃の追走曲（カノン）); Battle 239. "Invincible Siegfried" (無敵のジークフリート！); Battle 240. "Kisara's Will" (キサラの意地！); Battle 241. "Yomi – Asamiya Ryuuto" (YOMI・朝宮龍斗); Battle 242. "The Kuremisago" (暗鶚衆); Battle 243. "Source of Movements" (動きの源); Battle 244. "Ray of Hope" (希望の光); Battle 245. "Winner of the Brawl" (ケンカの勝者！); Battle 246. "Beginning of a Tragedy" (惨劇の幕開け); Battle 247. "Fists of Fury" (怒る鋼挙！)
28	March 18, 2008	978-4-09-121297-9
Battle 248. "The Great Raid" (大襲撃！); Battle 249. "The Person I Made a Promise With" (約束してくれた人); Battle 250. "Direct Teaching" (まっすぐな教え); Battle 251. "Fortuna's Counterattack" (フォルトナの逆襲); Battle 252. "Dance with the Superhumans" (超人、戦場に舞う！); Battle 253. "Fortuna, Master Class" (達人級（マスタークラス）・フォルトナ); Battle 254. "Concert of Friendship" (友情の協奏曲（コンチェルト）); Battle 255. "Shinpaku Alliance Gathered" (新白連合総力戦！); Battle 256. "Combined Strength" (重なりあう力); Battle 257. "Awakening" (覚醒)
29	May 16, 2008	978-4-09-121389-1
Battle 258. "Ryusui Seikuken" (流水制空圏); Battle 259. "Martial Arts Without Feelings" (非情なる武術); Battle 260. "Test Subject" (実験台); Battle 261. "Ryusui Seikuken's True Meaning" (流水制空圏の極意); Battle 262. "Disciples of 2 Masters" (2人の弟子); Battle 263. "The Result of the Death Match" (決着。そして...); Battle 264. "Flight Towards Freedom" (自由への飛翔); Battle 265. "Return of the Winners" (勝者たちの帰還); Battle 266. "Kajima Satomi" (鍛冶摩 里巳); Battle 267. "New Semester New Enemies" (波瀾の新学期)
30	August 11, 2008	978-4-09-121450-8
Battle 268. "Enlightenment of The Satsujin Ken" (殺人拳の啓蒙); Battle 269. "Yomi in High School" (YOMI IN THE HIGH SCHOOL); Battle 270. "Fist of Destruction, Alexander Gaidar" (殲滅の拳士); Battle 271. "Determination as a Martial Artist" (武道家の覚悟); Battle 272. "Night of the Super Masters" (超人ミッドナイト); Battle 273. "Complete the Mission" (命令遂行); Battle 274. "Quality of a Disciple" (弟子の本分); Battle 275. "Bond Between Master and Disciple" (以心伝心); Battle 276. "Capability of A Disciple" (弟子の本領); Battle 277. "United We Stand" (一致団結)
31	November 18, 2008	978-4-09-121508-6
Battle 278. "In the Same Boat" (呉越同舟); Battle 279. "Battle on the Horse" (馬上の攻防); Battle 280. "House of Battle" (戦いの館); Battle 281. "The Person Wo Knows About Weak Points" (弱点を知る者); Battle 282. "Terror! The Killing Fist" (恐怖！殺人拳); Battle 283. "Seed of Terror" (恐怖のタネ); Battle 284. "Rules Your World" (武器の世界); Battle 285. "Pick Up Your Sword!" (剣をとれ！); Battle 286. "The Man of Tsubanari" (鍔鳴りの男); Battle 287. "Armguards of Determination" (決意の防具)
32	February 18, 2009	978-4-09-121589-5
Battle 288. "Fear Detector" (恐怖センサー); Battle 289. "Blade of Condolence" (弔いの太刀); Battle 290. "The Unforgivable Person" (許されざる者); Battle 291. "Heart and Blade Become One" (心と刀を1つに); Battle 292. "The Blade that Cannot be Broken" (斬れない刀); Battle 293. "Return of the Soldiers!!" (コマンド再び!!); Battle 294. "In the Same Boat" (臨海学校); Battle 295. "Mountain Unit" (山岳部隊); Battle 296. "Begin the Operation" (ミッション発動！); Battle 297. "Forceful Breakthrough!!" (強行突破!!)
33	April 17, 2009	978-4-09-121893-3
Battle 298. "Summoning Flute of the Demon" (召喚魔笛); Battle 299. "Undercover Man" (潜伏の男); Battle 300. "Vs Mission" (バーサス・ミッション); Battle 301. "Ultimate Partnership" (究極タッグ!!); Battle 302. "The Evolutionary Mankind" (進歩する人種); Battle 303. "Determination of a Fight to Death" (決死たる覚悟); Battle 304. "Decision of the Master and His Disciple" (師弟の選択); Battle 305. "The Lingering Sound of Victory" (勝負の余韻); Battle 306. "Things the Eye Cannot See" (目に見えぬもの); Battle 307. "Worst Mismatch" (最悪の相性); Battle 308. "Fighting in My Own Way" ("ボク流"の戦い)
34	July 17, 2009	978-4-09-121693-9
Battle 309. "Omen of Oncoming Catastrophe" (災いの予感); Battle 310. "Crucial Situation" (危機一髪!!); Battle 311. "Attack Trail Fight" (技撃軌道戦); Battle 312. "Death God of the Underground Muay Tahi" (裏ムエタイ界の死神); Battle 313. "To Each His Own" (適材適所); Battle 314. "Troublemaker" (トラブルメーカー); Battle 315. "True Self" (本当の自分); Battle 316. "A Small Change" (ちょっとした変化); Battle 317. "The Best Training" (最高の修行); Battle 318. "Underground Boxing" (裏ボクシング)
35	September 17, 2009	978-4-09-121730-1; 978-4-09-159066-4 (LE)
Battle 319. "The Biggest Weakness" (最大の欠点); Battle 320. "Tenacity Towards Victory" (勝利への執念); Battle 321. "Full Power" ("全力"); Battle 322. "Moustaches and Bonds" (ヒゲと絆); Battle 323. "Good Fortune Comes to Those Who Smile!" (笑う門には福来たる!?); Battle 324. "Their Respective Intentions" (それぞれの意図); Battle 325. "The Sinister Party" (禍々しき宴); Battle 326. "Things That Should be Protected" (守るべき者); Battle 327. "Master March" (達人マッチ!!); Battle 328. "Full of Openings" (隙だらけ!?)
36	December 18, 2009	978-4-09-122026-4
Battle 329. "Angry Masters" (怒れる達人); Battle 330. "Timer Activated" (タイマー作動!!); Battle 331. "Can't Hold Back" (手加減不要); Battle 332. "On Top of the Sea" (海の上を...！); Battle 333. "Entertainer" (エンターテイナー); Battle 334. "Finale" (フィナーレ); Battle 335. "Get Stronger!" (強くなれ！); Battle 336. "Normal Girl" (ふつーの娘); Battle 337. "The Long Awaited Chance" (せっかくの機会); Battle 338. "Proposal" (提案)
37	February 18, 2010	978-4-09-122147-6
Battle 339. "A Counter Strategy" (対応策を...!!); Battle 340. "The Theory of Development" (発展の理); Battle 341. "The Wall to Overcome" (超えるべき壁); Battle 342. "The Sprouts of Effort" (努力の芽); Battle 343. "The Strength of His Balance" (重心力!!); Battle 344. "The Day Before the Fight" (決闘前日!!); Battle 345. "Slow Starter" (スロースターター!?); Battle 346. "The Seeds of Fear" (恐怖の種); Battle 347. "Trump Card" (奥の手!?); Battle 348. "Korui Nuki" (孤るい抜き)
38	May 18, 2010	978-4-09-122295-4
Battle 349. "Commence the Break In" (突入開始!!); Battle 350. "Rescue Mission" (救出戦!!); Battle 351. "Goodbye" (グッバイ); Battle 352. "Tanimoto Natsu" (谷本 夏); Battle 353. "True Form" (真の姿); Battle 354. "Death Match" ("死合い"); Battle 355. "Yomi, The Decider" (YOMI、決す!!); Battle 356. "The Promise Made To Honoka" (ほのかの約束); Battle 357. "Kenichi's Choice" (兼一の選択); Battle 358. "The Weapon User And The Unarmed Division" (武器組と無手組)
39	July 16, 2010	978-4-09-122417-0
Battle 359. "Red Feather Sword" (赤羽刀); Battle 360. "The Struggle For Excellent Swords" (名刀争奪戦!!); Battle 361. "Setsunamaru Vs Akabanetou" (刹那丸と赤羽刀); Battle 362. "And A Hero Comes Along" (救世主現る!?); Battle 363. "Local Battle" (局地戦!!); Battle 364. "The Real Masters" (真の達人たち); Battle 365. "Kushinada's Juujutsu" (櫛灘流柔術); Battle 366. "Unfortunate Words" (不吉な言葉); Battle 367. "Power To Face It" (逃げない力); Battle 368. "Level-Up?" (レベルアップ?)
40	October 18, 2010	978-4-09-122620-4
Battle 369. "Tanaka Tsutomu" (田中勤); Battle 370. "Interdisciplinary Sparring Match" (交流組手); Battle 371. "Two Similar Fighters" (似た者同士？); Battle 372. "Anti-Weapon Battle" (対武器戦!!); Battle 373. "The United" (共闘者たち); Battle 374. "Weapons, Face Off!!" (対、武器!!); Battle 375. "All Out War" (総力戦); Battle 376. "An Unexpected Obstacle" (思わぬ難関); Battle 377. "Cut Down" (斬られた!?); Battle 378. "A Disciple of the Armed Division" (武器組の弟子)

=== Volumes 41–61 ===
No.	Release date	ISBN
41	January 18, 2011	978-4-09-122767-6
Battle 379. "Kugatachi Style Jou-Jutsu" (久賀舘流杖術, "Kugatachi-ryū Jōjutsu"); Battle 380. "House Arrest" (謹慎, "Kinshin"); Battle 380.5. "Kenichi: History's Strongest Disciple—Side Story: The Boy Who Came from the Mountains" (史上最強の弟子ケンイチ外伝 〜山より来たりし男の子〜, Shijō Saikyō no Deshi Ken'ichi Gaiden Yama Yoriki Tarishi Otokonoko); Battle 381. "Reaction" (リアクション); Battle 382. "To Okinawa* (沖縄へ!!, "Okinawa e!!"); Battle 383. "Anxious Friends" (心強い友!?, "Kokorozuyoi Tomo!?"); Battle 384. "Front-On Attack" (正面突破!!, "Shōmen Toppa!!"); Battle 385. "Base Invasion" (拠点侵攻, "Kyoten Shinkō"); Battle 386. "Battles On All Fronts" (全面衝突, "Zenmen Shōtotsu"); Battle 387. "Shigure Vs The Lance of the West" (しぐれV.S.西の槍, "Shigure V.S. Nishi no Yari")
42	April 18, 2011	978-4-09-122850-5
Battle 388. "Ma Vs Akisame" (馬V.S.秋雨, "Ma V.S. Akisame"); Battle 389. "Akisame Vs The Spear of The East" (秋雨V.S."東の槍", "Akisame V.S. 'Higashi no Yari'"); Battle 390. "Ma Vs Kyoken no Izayoi" (馬V.S.狂剣のイザヨイ, "Ma V.S. Kyōken no Izayoi"); Battle 391. "Sakaki Vs The Spear of The Core" (逆鬼V.S.中央の槍, "Sakaki V.S. Chūō no Yari"); Battle 392. "Start of The Decisive Battle" (決戦開始, "Kessen Kaishi"); Battle 393. "Akisame Style Information Confrontation" (秋雨流情報戦, "Akisame-ryū Jōhōsen"); Battle 394. "A Meeting In The Underground Muay Thai World" (裏ムエタイ界での出会い, "Ura Muetai-kai de no Deai"); Battle 395. "Underground Muay Thai World" (裏ムエタイ界, "Ura Muetai-kai"); Battle 396. "Muay Boran" (ムエボーラン); Battle 397. "Revenge" (仇討ち, "Adauchi")
43	May 18, 2011	978-4-09-122869-7
Battle 398. "Spirit of Disciple" (弟子の意地, "Deshi no Iji"); Battle 399. "Screams of The Heart" (心の叫び, "Kokoro Sakebi"); Battle 400. "The Grand Conclusion" (壮絶なる決着, "Sōzetsunaru Kecchaku"); Battle 401. "Broken Soul" (砕かれた魂, "Kudakareta Tama"); Battle 402. "The Depths of The Heart" (心の淵, "Kokoro no Fuchi"); Battle 403. "Those Forced To Stand Up" (立ち上がらせるもの, "Tachiagaraseru Mono"); Battle 404. "The Absolute Basics" (絶対なる基本技, "Zettainaru Kihon Waza"); Battle 405. "The Conclusion" (死んでも, "Shindemo"); Battle 406. "The Path of Power" ("力"の道, "'Chikara' no Machi"); Battle 407. "Farewell To The Death God" (死神との別れ, "Shinigami tono Wakare')
44	October 18, 2011	978-4-09-123334-9
Battle 408. "The End of The Fight" (戦い終えて); Battle 409. "The Wanted Men" (おたずねもの); Battle 410. "Young Detective Squad?" (少年探偵団?); Battle 411. "Time To Fulfill That Promise" (誓いを果たす時); Battle 412. "Priest Soldier" (僧兵); Battle 413. "The Traitor" (裏切り者); Battle 414. "Between A Tiger And A Wolf" (前門の虎 後門の狼); Battle 415. "The Battle Over A Disk" (ディスクをめぐる攻防); Battle 416. "Reinforcement Arrival!" (援軍到着!); Battle 417. "The Girl That Is Way Too Fast" (速すぎる彼女)
45	November 18, 2011	978-4-09-123384-4
Battle 418. "Rittoku No Kan"; Battle 419. "A Team Battle of Friends"; Battle 420. "The Location of The Data"; Battle 421. "Vs. Mastermind"; Battle 422. "Sakaki's Rage"; Battle 423. "Developments"; Battle 424. "Common People Observing Journal"; Battle 425. "I Want to Ask!"; Battle 426. "The Mystery of the Kuremisago"; Battle 427. "Uninhabited Village"
46	March 16, 2012; March 14, 2012 (LE)	978-4-09-123564-0; 978-4-09-941722-2 (LE)
Battle 428. "Revenge"; Battle 429. "Why is he Dead?"; Battle 430. "Saiga & Shizuka"; Battle 431. "An Approaching Life or Death Battle"; Battle 432. "The One Shadow Nine Fists Scheme"; Battle 433. "The Two Rivals Start To Move"; Battle 434. "Yami's Chivalrous Order"; Battle 435. "The True Karate"; Battle 436. "The Battle of Shockwave's Orbit"; Battle 437. "The Three Men of Valor"
47	June 18, 2012; June 15, 2012 (LE)	978-4-09-123697-5; 978-4-09-941740-6 (LE)
Battle 438. "Diligent Study"; Battle 439. "Ambush"; Battle 440. "Suzuki Hajime's Dream"; Battle 441. "Man of Darkness"; Battle 442. "Death Match"; Battle 443. "Selfishness"; Battle 444. "Katsujin & Satsujin"; Battle 445. "Lump of Martial Arts"; Battle 446. "Miu's Fury"; Battle 447. "Fight for Miu"
48	September 18, 2012	978-4-09-123805-4
Battle 448. "Miu's Whereabouts"; Battle 449. "A Village Deep In The Mountains"; Battle 450. "Tidat's Kingdom"; Battle 451. "To Tidat Kingdom"; Battle 452. "Follow the Lead"; Battle 453. "Successor to the Throne"; Battle 454. "Oath of the Queen"; Battle 455. "Clue"; Battle 456. "Bulu Indah"; Battle 457. "Common Front"
49	November 16, 2012; November 14, 2012 (LE)	978-4-09-124010-1; 978-4-09-941805-2 (LE)
Battle 458. "Junazard's Expectations"; Battle 459. "A Heartless Opponent"; Battle 460. "A Fractured Heart"; Battle 461. "The Next Assassin"; Battle 462. "Pride and Faith"; Battle 463. "Things You Should Protect"; Battle 464. "Promise"; Battle 465. "Welcome Back"; Battle 466. "The Gauntlet Mementos"; Battle 467. "Furinji Saiga"
50	February 18, 2013	978-4-09-124182-5
Battle 468. "Fist of Killing vs. Fist of Killing"; Battle 469. "Front Kick"; Battle 470. "Checkmate!"; Battle 471. "Master and Disciple"; Battle 472. "Dimension Apart"; Battle 473. "Life Within Death"; Battle 474. "The Abyss of Death"; Battle 475. "Tenacity Towards Martial Arts"; Battle 476. "Martial Arts for Beliefs' Sake"; Battle 477. "Outbreak of a Civil War?!"
51	May 17, 2013	978-4-09-124302-7; 978-4-09-159148-7 (LE)
Battle 478. "Return of the King"; Battle 479. "In the Far East Land"; Battle 480. "Distance Between Two"; Battle 481. "Double Date"; Battle 482. "Secret Meeting at the Aquarium"; Battle 483. "Decisive Battle at the Aquarium!"; Battle 484. "Even If This Body Will..."; Battle 485. "Heartbeats"; Battle 486. "Everyone's Motivation"; Battle 487. "The Ones Who Wait and the Ones who Don't Wait"
52	August 16, 2013	978-4-09-124348-5
Battle 488. "The Duel"; Battle 489. "The Karma Circle of Martial Arts"; Battle 490. "Because It's Sad"; Battle 491. "All of Ryouzanpaku Departs; Battle 492. "Weird Feeling; Battle 493. "Mysterious"; Battle 494. "Submission Man"; Battle 495. "Combination"; Battle 496. "The Light of Katsujinken"; Battle 497. "Kensei's Project"
53	September 18, 2013; September 13, 2013 (LE)	978-4-09-124404-8; 978-4-09-159148-7 (LE)
Battle 498. "Before the Storm...."; Battle 499. "The Ones Who Stand in the Shadows of the Arts"; Battle 500. "Start!"; Battle 501. "A Series of Battles"; Battle 502. "For the Sake of Love"; Battle 503. "To Be Loved"; Battle 504. "The YOMIs Power"; Battle 505. "Cautious"; Battle 506. "Devouring Each Other"; Battle 507. "Shiba's Hint"
54	November 18, 2013; November 15, 2013 (LE)	978-4-09-124493-2; 978-4-09-941824-3 (LE)
Battle 508. "The Mastermind Appears"; Battle 509. "Life and Death decided in instant"; Battle 510. "Ki on rampage"; Battle 511. "Fly!"; Battle 512. "That Technique"; Battle 513. "Everyone's Limit"; Battle 514. "At The End of Love"; Battle 515. "Devil"; Battle 516. "The Meaning of Doing Martial Arts"; Battle 517. "Attack And Defense In 30 Seconds"
55	February 18, 2014; February 14, 2014 (LE)	978-4-09-124561-8; 978-4-09-941826-7 (LE)
Battle 518. "Everything At Stake"; Battle 519. "End of The Local Wars"; Battle 520. "Guide To The Darkness"; Battle 521. "The Truth Behind Tanaka Tsutomu"; Battle 522. "A Tragedy Brought By An Ideology"; Battle 523. "Unstoppable"; Battle 524. "Protect"; Battle 525. "The End of The Deathfight"; Battle 526. "The Ones Who Got Out of The Darkness"; Battle 527. "The Steps of The Weapon Team"
56	May 16, 2014; May 14, 2014 (LE)	978-4-09-124642-4; 978-4-09-941832-8 (LE)
Battle 528. "Shigure-Chan Special"; Battle 529. "The Shinpaku Alliance Turns Into A Weapon Team!?"; Battle 530. "Something To Give You"; Battle 531. "The Hachiou Executioner Blade"; Battle 532. "Something You Can't Oppose"; Battle 533. "The Darkness' Mightiness"; Battle 534. "The True Form of Unease"; Battle 535. "Head-On Collision"; Battle 536. "The Power of Katsujinken"; Battle 537. "The Real Goal"
57	August 18, 2014	978-4-09-125078-0; 978-4-09-159198-2 (LE)
Battle 538. "Distraction"; Battle 539. "The Meaning of The Decoy"; Battle 540. "The Emptiness of The Power"; Battle 541. "The Work of A Professional"; Battle 542. "Kousaka School Final Technique"; Battle 543. "Long Lasting Battle"; Battle 544. "Witch"; Battle 545. "The Man Who Knows That Mouse"; Battle 546. "Shigure, Her Father And Her Disciple Brother"; Battle 547. "The Darkness Moves Forth"
58	September 18, 2014	978-4-09-125110-7
Battle 548. "The Shinpaku Alliance Information Squad"; Battle 549. "The Wild Masters"; Battle 550. "Clue"; Battle 551. "Sextant"; Battle 552. "Kiyoi Kidou"; Battle 553. "Fight In The Telecommunications Room"; Battle 554. "Cultural Exchange"; Battle 555. "Detached Unit"; Battle 556. "Determination And Decision"; Battle 557. "The War Starts"
59	October 17, 2014	978-4-09-125319-4
Battle 558. "Master Ba's Wrath" (馬師の怒り, Ma-shi no Ikari); Battle 559. "Divide" (分割, Bunkatsu); Battle 560. "Disciple's Mission" (弟子の任務, Deshi no Ninmu); Battle 561. "Each and Every Role" (それぞれの役割, Sorezore no Yakuwari); Battle 562. "Two Master's Orders" (2人の師の命, Futari no Shi no Mei); Battle 563. "Two Orders" (二つの指命, Futatsu no Shimei); Battle 564. "The Time of Demise" (終焉の時, Shūen no Toki); Battle 565. "Facing the Killing Fist's Attack" (殺人拳の合わせ技, Setsuninken no Awase Waza); Battle 566. "Cage of Battle" (戦の檻, Ikusa no Ori); Battle 567. "Life and Honor" (命と名誉と, Inochi to Meiyo to)
60	November 18, 2014	978-4-09-125368-2
Battle 568. "Methods" (道のあり方, Michi no Arikata); Battle 569. "Mid-Air Dismemberment" (空中分解, Kūchū Bunkai); Battle 570. "Of Martial Arts" (武術とは, Bujutsu to wa); Battle 571. "Nijima's Offense and Defense" (新島を巡る攻防, Nījima o Meguru Kōbō); Battle 572. "Merciless Confrontation" (残酷な再会, Zankokuna Saikai); Battle 573. "One Shadow's True Self" (一影の正体, Ichiei no Shōtai); Battle 574. "I Do Believe" (信じるさ, Shinjirusa); Battle 575. "The Kuremisago Rebellion" (暗鶚の乱, Kuremisago no Ran); Battle 576. "The Kuremisago's Darkness" (暗鶚の闇, Kuremisago no Yami)
61	February 18, 2015	978-4-09-125627-0
Battle 577. "Disciple vs. Master" (弟子VS.達人, Deshi VS. Tatsujin); Battle 578. "Battleground of the Gods" (神々の戦場, Kamigami no Senjō); Battle 579. "New Technique" (新たな技, Aratana Waza); Battle 580. "Ki Holding" (気の消化, Ki no Shōka); Battle 581. "Missile Course" (ミサイルの行方, Misairu no Yukue); Battle 582. "Those Who Persist" (貫いたもの, Tsuranuita Mono); Battle 583. "The Path to Becoming the Strongest" (最強への道, Saikyō e no Michi)
