= List of best-selling manga =

The following is a list of the best-selling Japanese manga series to date in terms of the number of collected tankōbon volumes sold. All series in this list have at least 20 million copies in circulation. This list is limited to Japanese manga and does not include manhwa, manhua, or original English-language manga. The series are listed according to the highest sales or circulation (copies in print) estimate of their collected tankōbon volumes as reported in reliable sources unless indicated otherwise. Ties are arranged in alphabetical order.

Note that most manga series are first serialized and sold as part of manga magazines, before being sold separately as individual collected tankōbon volumes. This list only includes the number of collected tankōbon volumes sold.

== Collected tankōbon volumes ==
Legend

- Background shading indicates manga series currently running.
- † Dagger glyph indicates the number of tankōbon copies a series has in circulation/print, rather than actually sold.
- ‡ Double-dagger glyph indicates that the number includes digital sales.

=== At least 100 million copies ===
Manga series	Author(s)	Publisher	Demographic	No. of collected volumes	Serialized	Approximate sales
One Piece	Eiichiro Oda	Shueisha	Shōnen	115	1997–present	600 million†‡
Doraemon	Fujiko F. Fujio	Shogakukan	Children	45	1969–1996	300 million
Golgo 13	Takao Saito, Saito Production	Shogakukan	Seinen	221	1968–present	300 million†
Case Closed / Detective Conan	Gosho Aoyama	Shogakukan	Shōnen	108	1994–present	270 million†
Dragon Ball	Akira Toriyama	Shueisha	Shōnen	42	1984–1995	260 million
Naruto	Masashi Kishimoto	Shueisha	Shōnen	72	1999–2014	250 million†
Demon Slayer: Kimetsu no Yaiba	Koyoharu Gotouge	Shueisha	Shōnen	23	2016–2020	220 million†‡
Slam Dunk	Takehiko Inoue	Shueisha	Shōnen	31	1990–1996	185 million†
KochiKame: Tokyo Beat Cops	Osamu Akimoto	Shueisha	Shōnen	201	1976–2016	157.2 million†
Jujutsu Kaisen	Gege Akutami	Shueisha	Shōnen	30	2018–2024	150 million†‡
Crayon Shin-chan	Yoshito Usui, UY Team	Futabasha	Seinen	65	1990–present	148 million† (Note: Includes Crayon Shin-chan and its sequel series; New Crayon Shin-chan)
Attack on Titan	Hajime Isayama	Kodansha	Shōnen	34	2009–2021	140 million†‡
Oishinbo	Tetsu Kariya, Akira Hanasaki	Shogakukan	Seinen	111	1983–2014 (on hiatus)	135 million†
Bleach	Tite Kubo	Shueisha	Shōnen	74	2001–2016	130 million†
Kingdom	Yasuhisa Hara	Shueisha	Seinen	81	2006–present	130 million†‡
JoJo's Bizarre Adventure	Hirohiko Araki	Shueisha	Shōnen / Seinen	139	1987–present	120 million†
Astro Boy	Osamu Tezuka	Kobunsha	Shōnen	23	1952–1968	100 million
Baki the Grappler	Keisuke Itagaki	Akita Shoten	Shōnen	156	1991–present	100 million† (Note: Includes Baki the Grappler's sequel series; New Grappler Baki, Hanma Baki, Baki-Dou, Bakidou and Baki Rahen)
Fist of the North Star	Buronson, Tetsuo Hara	Shueisha	Shōnen	27	1983–1988	100 million
Hajime no Ippo	George Morikawa	Kodansha	Shōnen	145	1989–present	100 million†
Hunter × Hunter	Yoshihiro Togashi	Shueisha	Shōnen	39	1998–present	100 million†‡
The Kindaichi Case Files	Yōzaburō Kanari, Seimaru Amagi, Fumiya Satō	Kodansha	Shōnen / Seinen	102	1992–present	100 million†
My Hero Academia	Kōhei Horikoshi	Shueisha	Shōnen	42	2014–2024	100 million†‡
Touch	Mitsuru Adachi	Shogakukan	Shōnen	26	1981–1986	100 million

=== Between 50 million and 99 million copies ===
Manga series	Author(s)	Publisher	Demographic	No. of collected volumes	Serialized	Approximate sales
Captain Tsubasa	Yōichi Takahashi	Shueisha	Shōnen / Seinen	110	1981–2024	90 million† (Note: Includes Captain Tsubasa and its sequel series; Captain Tsubasa: World Youth, Captain Tsubasa: Road to 2002, Captain Tsubasa: Golden-23, Captain Tsubasa: Kaigai Gekito Hen, and Captain Tsubasa: Rising Sun)
Fullmetal Alchemist	Hiromu Arakawa	Enix (2001–2003); Square Enix (2003–2010)	Shōnen	27	2001–2010	90 million†
Sazae-san	Machiko Hasegawa	Kodansha	—	68	1946–1974	86 million
Kinnikuman	Yudetamago	Shueisha	Shōnen / Seinen	93	1979–1987, 2011–present	85 million†
Vagabond	Takehiko Inoue	Kodansha	Seinen	37	1998–2015 (on hiatus)	82 million
Sangokushi	Mitsuteru Yokoyama	Ushio Shuppansha	Shōnen	60	1971–1986	80 million
Tokyo Revengers	Ken Wakui	Kodansha	Shōnen	31	2017–2022	80 million†‡
Haikyu!!	Haruichi Furudate	Shueisha	Shōnen	45	2012–2020	75 million†
Gintama	Hideaki Sorachi	Shueisha	Shōnen	77	2003–2019	73 million†‡
Fairy Tail	Hiro Mashima	Kodansha	Shōnen	63	2006–2017	72 million†
Rurouni Kenshin	Nobuhiro Watsuki	Shueisha	Shōnen	28	1994–1999	72 million†‡
Berserk	Kentaro Miura, Kouji Mori, Studio Gaga	Hakusensha	Seinen	43	1989–present	70 million†‡
Major	Takuya Mitsuda	Shogakukan	Shōnen	110	1994–present	66.66 million† (Note: Includes Major and its sequel series; Major 2nd.)
Blue Lock	Muneyuki Kaneshiro, Yusuke Nomura	Kodansha	Shōnen	39	2018–present	65 million†‡
That Time I Got Reincarnated as a Slime	Fuse, Taiki Kawakami	Kodansha	Shōnen	32	2015–present	62 million† (Note: Includes the original light novel and its spin-offs)
Boys Over Flowers	Yoko Kamio	Shueisha	Shōjo	37	1992–2003	61 million†
Minami no Teiō	Dai Tennōji, Rikiya Gō	Nihon Bungeisha	Seinen	188	1992–2026	60 million†
The Prince of Tennis	Takeshi Konomi	Shueisha	Shōnen	42	1999–2008	60 million†
Rokudenashi Blues	Masanori Morita	Shueisha	Shōnen	42	1988–1997	60 million†
The Apothecary Diaries	Hyūganatsu, Minoji Kurata, Nekokurage	Square Enix; Shogakukan	Seinen	39	2017–present	57 million†‡ (Note: Includes the original light novel and its two manga adaptations)
Initial D	Shuichi Shigeno	Kodansha	Seinen	48	1995–2013	56 million†
Bad Boys	Hiroshi Tanaka	Shōnen Gahōsha	Seinen	22	1988–1996	55 million†
H2	Mitsuru Adachi	Shogakukan	Shōnen	34	1992–1999	55 million†
Ranma ½	Rumiko Takahashi	Shogakukan	Shōnen	38	1987–1996	55 million†
The Seven Deadly Sins	Nakaba Suzuki	Kodansha	Shōnen	68 (Note: Including Four Knights of the Apocalypse)	2012–present	55 million†‡
Shura no Mon	Masatoshi Kawahara	Kodansha	Shōnen	31	1987–1996	55 million†‡
Super Radical Gag Family	Kenji Hamaoka	Akita Shoten	Shōnen	107	1993–present	51 million† (Note: Includes Super Radical Gag Family and its sequel series; Ganso! Super Radical Gag Family, Maido! Super Radical Gag Family and Appare! Super Radical Gag Family; and its spin-off manga series Gaiden! Super Radical Gag Family Tatakae! Harumaki and Otakara! Super Radical Gag Family)
City Hunter	Tsukasa Hojo	Shueisha	Shōnen	35	1985–1991	50 million†
Cobra	Buichi Terasawa	Shueisha	Shōnen	18	1978–1984	50 million†
Devilman	Go Nagai	Kodansha	Shōnen	5	1972–1973	50 million†
Dragon Quest: The Adventure of Dai	Riku Sanjo, Koji Inada	Shueisha	Shōnen	37	1989–1996	50 million†
Fisherman Sanpei	Takao Yaguchi	Kodansha	Shōnen	65	1973–1983	50 million†
Glass Mask	Suzue Miuchi	Hakusensha	Shōjo	49	1976–2012 (on hiatus)	50 million†
Great Teacher Onizuka	Tooru Fujisawa	Kodansha	Shōnen	25	1997–2002	50 million
Inuyasha	Rumiko Takahashi	Shogakukan	Shōnen	56	1996–2008	50 million†
Nana	Ai Yazawa	Shueisha	Shōjo	21	2000–2009 (on hiatus)	50 million†
Saint Seiya	Masami Kurumada	Shueisha	Shōnen	28	1985–1990	50 million
Shoot!	Tsukasa Ōshima	Kodansha	Shōnen	66	1990–2003	50 million†
YuYu Hakusho	Yoshihiro Togashi	Shueisha	Shōnen	19	1990–1994	50 million

=== Between 30 million and 49 million copies ===
Manga series	Author(s)	Publisher	Demographic	No. of collected volumes	Serialized	Approximate sales
Dokaben	Shinji Mizushima	Akita Shoten	Shōnen	205	1972–2018	48 million†
Black Jack	Osamu Tezuka	Akita Shoten	Shōnen	25	1973–1983	47.66 million (Note: While some sources claim there are 100 million copies sold worldwide, NHK reports that no official statistics confirm this figure.)
Kosaku Shima	Kenshi Hirokane	Kodansha	Seinen	92	1983–present	47 million†‡ (Note: Includes all sequels.)
Tokyo Ghoul	Sui Ishida	Shueisha	Seinen	30	2011–2018	47 million† (Note: Includes Tokyo Ghoul's sequel series, Tokyo Ghoul:re)
Crows	Hiroshi Takahashi	Akita Shoten	Shōnen	26	1990–1998	46 million†
Sailor Moon	Naoko Takeuchi	Kodansha	Shōjo	18	1991–1997	46 million†‡ (Note: Includes all the re-editions of the manga volumes)
Shizukanaru Don – Yakuza Side Story	Tatsuo Nitta	Jitsugyo no Nihon Sha	Seinen	108	1988–2013	46 million†
Ace of Diamond	Yuji Terajima	Kodansha	Shōnen	81	2006–2022	45 million† (Note: Includes Ace of Diamond's sequel series Ace of Diamond Act II)
Dear Boys	Hiroki Yagami	Kodansha	Shōnen	101	1989–present	45 million† (Note: Includes Dear Boys and its sequel series; Dear Boys: The Early Days, Dear Boys: Act 2, Dear Boys: Act 3, Dear Boys: Over Time, and Dear Boys: Act 4)
Shonan Junai Gumi	Tooru Fujisawa	Kodansha	Shōnen	31	1990–1996	45 million†
Yu-Gi-Oh!	Kazuki Takahashi	Shueisha	Shōnen	38	1996–2004	44 million†
The Promised Neverland	Kaiu Shirai, Posuka Demizu	Shueisha	Shōnen	20	2016–2020	43 million†‡
Spy × Family	Tatsuya Endo	Shueisha	Shōnen	17	2019–present	42 million†
Shaman King	Hiroyuki Takei	Shueisha; Kodansha	Shōnen	32	1998–2004	41 million† (Note: Includes the total print number of its spin-off and re-editions)
Be-Bop High School	Kazuhiro Kiuchi	Kodansha	Seinen	48	1983–2003	40 million
Cooking Papa	Tochi Ueyama	Kodansha	Seinen	178	1985–present	40 million†
Crest of the Royal Family	Chieko Hosokawa	Akita Shoten	Shōjo	71	1976–present	40 million†
Kyō Kara Ore Wa!!	Hiroyuki Nishimori	Shogakukan	Shōnen	38	1988–1997	40 million†
Nodame Cantabile	Tomoko Ninomiya	Kodansha	Josei	25	2001–2010	39 million†
One-Punch Man	One, Yusuke Murata	Shueisha	Seinen	37	2012–present	38 million†‡
Black Butler	Yana Toboso	Square Enix	Shōnen	35	2006–present	36 million†
Chainsaw Man	Tatsuki Fujimoto	Shueisha	Shōnen	24	2018–2026	36 million†‡
Kimi ni Todoke	Karuho Shiina	Shueisha	Shōjo	30	2005–2017	36 million†‡
The Chef	Mai Tsurugina, Tadashi Katou	Nihon Bungeisha	Seinen	41	1985–1993	35 million†
Chibi Maruko-chan	Momoko Sakura	Shueisha	Shōjo	18	1986–2022	35 million†‡
Frieren: Beyond Journey's End	Kanehito Yamada, Tsukasa Abe	Shogakukan	Shōnen	15	2020–present	35 million†
Itazura na Kiss	Kaoru Tada	Shueisha	Shōjo	23	1990–1999	35 million†
Salary Man Kintaro	Hiroshi Motomiya	Shueisha	Seinen	30	1994–2002	35 million†
Space Brothers	Chūya Koyama	Kodansha	Seinen	46	2007–2026	35 million†‡
Urusei Yatsura	Rumiko Takahashi	Shogakukan	Shōnen	34	1978–1987	35 million†
Worst	Hiroshi Takahashi	Akita Shoten	Shōnen	33	2002–2013	35 million†
Yowamushi Pedal	Wataru Watanabe	Akita Shoten	Shōnen	101	2008–present	35 million†
3×3 Eyes	Yuzo Takada	Kodansha	Seinen	40	1987–2002	33.33 million†
Kaze Densetsu: Bukkomi no Taku	Hiroto Saki, Juzo Tokoro	Kodansha	Shōnen / Seinen	27	1991–1997	33 million†
Hell Teacher: Jigoku Sensei Nube	Shō Makura, Takeshi Okano	Shueisha	Shōnen	31	1993–1999	32 million†‡
The Silent Service	Kaiji Kawaguchi	Kodansha	Seinen	32	1988–1996	32 million†‡
A Certain Magical Index	Kazuma Kamachi	Square Enix	Shōnen	33	2007–present	31 million† (Note: Includes the original light novel and its spin-offs)
Kuroko's Basketball	Tadatoshi Fujimaki	Shueisha	Shōnen	30	2008–2014	31 million†
Bastard!!	Kazushi Hagiwara	Shueisha	Shōnen / Seinen	27	1988–2012 (on hiatus)	30 million†
Chameleon	Atsushi Kase	Kodansha	Shōnen	47	1990–2000	30 million†
Death Note	Tsugumi Ohba, Takeshi Obata	Shueisha	Shōnen	12	2003–2006	30 million†
Dr. Slump	Akira Toriyama	Shueisha	Shōnen	18	1980–1984	30 million†
The Fable	Katsuhisa Minami	Kodansha	Seinen	36	2014–present	30 million†‡ (Note: Includes The Fable's sequel series The Fable Second Contact and The Fable Third Secret)
Fruits Basket	Natsuki Takaya	Hakusensha	Shōjo	23	1998–2006	30 million†
Gaki Deka	Tatsuhiko Yamagami	Akita Shoten	Shōnen	26	1974–1980	30 million†
Golden Kamuy	Satoru Noda	Shueisha	Seinen	31	2014–2022	30 million†
Jarinko Chie	Etsumi Haruki	Futabasha	Seinen	67	1978–1997	30 million†
Jingi	Tachihara Ayumi	Akita Shoten	Seinen	66	1988–2017	30 million† (Note: Includes Jingi and its sequel series; JingiS and Jingi Zero)
Kaiji	Nobuyuki Fukumoto	Kodansha	Seinen	91	1996–present	30 million† (Note: Includes Tobaku Mokushiroku Kaiji's sequel series; Tobaku Hakairoku Kaiji, Tobaku Datenroku Kaiji, Tobaku Datenroku Kaiji Kazuya-Hen, Tobaku Datenroku Kaiji One Poker Hen and Tobaku Datenroku Kaiji: 24 Oku Dasshutsu-hen.)
Pokémon Adventures	Hidenori Kusaka, Mato, Satoshi Yamamoto	Shogakukan	Children	64	1997–present	30 million†
Reborn!	Akira Amano	Shueisha	Shōnen	42	2004–2012	30 million†
Tokimeki Tonight	Koi Ikeno	Shueisha	Shōjo	30	1982–1994	30 million†
Toriko	Mitsutoshi Shimabukuro	Shueisha	Shōnen	43	2008–2016	30 million†
Ushio & Tora	Kazuhiro Fujita	Shogakukan	Shōnen	33	1990–1996	30 million†
Yawara!	Naoki Urasawa	Shogakukan	Seinen	29	1986–1993	30 million†

=== Between 20 million and 29 million copies ===
Manga series	Author(s)	Publisher	Demographic	No. of collected volumes	Serialized	Approximate sales
Futari Ecchi	Katsu Aki	Hakusensha	Seinen	95	1997–present	29.5 million†‡
Chihayafuru	Yuki Suetsugu	Kodansha	Josei	50	2007–2022	29 million†
Shonan Bakusozoku	Satoshi Yoshida	Shōnen Gahōsha	Shōnen	16	1982–1988	29 million†
Asari-chan	Mayumi Muroyama	Shogakukan	Shōjo	100	1978–2014	28 million†
Assassination Classroom	Yūsei Matsui	Shueisha	Shōnen	21	2012–2016	27 million†
D.Gray-man	Katsura Hoshino	Shueisha	Shōnen	29	2004–present	27 million†
Eyeshield 21	Riichiro Inagaki, Yusuke Murata	Shueisha	Shōnen	37	2002–2009	27 million†‡
Sakigake!! Otokojuku	Akira Miyashita	Shueisha	Shōnen	34	1985–1991	27 million†
Seito Shokun!	Yoko Shoji	Kodansha	Shōjo / Josei	79	1977–2019	27 million† (Note: Includes Seito Shokun!'s sequel series Seito Shokun! Kyoshi-hen and Seito Shokun! Saishū-shō: Tabidachi)
Yūkan Club	Yukari Ichijo	Shueisha	Shōjo	19	1982–2002	27 million
20th Century Boys	Naoki Urasawa	Shogakukan	Seinen	22	1999–2006	26.4 million†
Aoashi	Yugo Kobayashi, Naohiko Ueno	Shogakukan	Seinen	40	2015–2025	26 million†‡
Bari Bari Densetsu	Shuichi Shigeno	Kodansha	Shōnen	38	1983–1991	26 million†
Tsuribaka Nisshi	Jūzō Yamasaki, Kenichi Kitami	Shogakukan	Seinen	118	1979–present	26 million†
Angel Heart	Tsukasa Hojo	Shinchosha (Note: First series); Tokuma Shoten (Note: Second series)	Seinen	49	2001–2017	25 million† (Note: Includes Angel Heart (published by Shinchosha) and Angel Heart: 2nd Season (published by Tokuma Shoten))
Ashita no Joe	Ikki Kajiwara, Tetsuya Chiba	Kodansha	Shōnen	20	1968–1973	25 million†
Black Clover	Yūki Tabata	Shueisha	Shōnen	38	2015–2026	25 million†‡
Blue Exorcist	Kazue Kato	Shueisha	Shōnen	34	2009–present	25 million†
Boys Be...	Masahiro Itabashi, Hiroyuki Tamakoshi	Kodansha	Shōnen	58	1991–2001	25 million†
Emblem Take 2	Kazumasa Kiuchi, Jun Watanabe	Kodansha	Seinen	62	1990–2004	25 million†
Flame of Recca	Nobuyuki Anzai	Shogakukan	Shōnen	33	1995–2002	25 million†
Fushigi Yûgi	Yuu Watase	Shogakukan	Shōjo / Josei	34 (Note: Including Fushigi Yuugi Genbu Kaiden and Fushigi Yuugi Byakko Senki)	1991–present	25 million† (Note: Includes the print number of the side-story light novel series Fushigi Yuugi Gaiden and its prequel series; Fushigi Yuugi Genbu Kaiden and Fushigi Yuugi Byakko Senki)
Hikaru no Go	Yumi Hotta, Takeshi Obata	Shueisha	Shōnen	23	1998–2003	25 million†
Magi: The Labyrinth of Magic	Shinobu Ohtaka	Shogakukan	Shōnen	37	2009–2017	25 million†
Maison Ikkoku	Rumiko Takahashi	Shogakukan	Seinen	15	1980–1987	25 million†
Miyuki	Mitsuru Adachi	Shogakukan	Shōnen	12	1980–1984	25 million†
Neon Genesis Evangelion	Yoshiyuki Sadamoto	Kadokawa Shoten	Shōnen	14	1994–2013	25 million
Oh My Goddess!	Kōsuke Fujishima	Kodansha	Seinen	48	1988–2014	25 million†
Oshi no Ko	Aka Akasaka, Mengo Yokoyari	Shueisha	Seinen	16	2020–2024	25 million†‡
Patalliro!	Mineo Maya	Hakusensha	Shōjo	104	1979–present	25 million†
Parasyte	Hitoshi Iwaaki	Kodansha	Seinen	10	1989–1994	25 million†
The Ping Pong Club	Minoru Furuya	Kodansha	Seinen	13	1993–1996	25 million†
Saiyuki	Kazuya Minekura	Square Enix (Note: First series and Gaiden prequel); Ichijinsha (Note: Second and third series and its prequel (Gaiden and Ibun))	Shōnen / Shōjo / Josei	27	1997–present	25 million† (Note: Includes Saiyuki and its sequel and prequel series; Saiyuki Reload, Saiyuki Reload Blast, Saiyuki Gaiden and Saiyuki Ibun)
Tasogare Ryūseigun	Kenshi Hirokane	Shogakukan	Seinen	79	1995–present	25 million†
Ahiru no Sora	Takeshi Hinata	Kodansha	Shōnen	51	2004–2019 (on hiatus)	24 million†
Gantz	Hiroya Oku	Shueisha	Seinen	37	2000–2013	24 million† (Note: Includes Gantz and its spin-off; Gantz:G, Gantz/Minus, Gantz/Exa and Gantz:E)
Kaguya-sama: Love Is War	Aka Akasaka	Shueisha	Seinen	28	2015–2022	24 million†
Zatch Bell!	Makoto Raiku	Shogakukan	Shōnen	33	2001–2007	23.8 million†‡
Rave Master	Hiro Mashima	Kodansha	Shōnen	35	1999–2005	23.5 million†
Giant Killing	Masaya Tsunamoto, Tsujitomo	Kodansha	Seinen	70	2007–present	23 million†
Himitsu Series	Yasuko Uchiyama, Tokuo Yokota, Terumi Fujiki, Yoshitari Iizuka	Gakken	Children	116	1972–2014	23 million† (Note: Includes Shin-Himitsu series)
The Rose of Versailles	Riyoko Ikeda	Shueisha	Shōjo	10	1972–1973	23 million†
Ushijima the Loan Shark	Shohei Manabe	Shogakukan	Seinen	46	2004–2019	23 million†
Abu-san	Shinji Mizushima	Shogakukan	Seinen	107	1973–2014	22 million†
Cardcaptor Sakura	Clamp	Kodansha	Shōjo	28	1996–2023	22 million†‡ (Note: Includes Cardcaptor Sakura's sequel series; Cardcaptor Sakura: Clear Card)
Don't Call It Mystery	Yumi Tamura	Shogakukan	Josei	16	2016–present	22 million†‡
Hayate the Combat Butler	Kenjiro Hata	Shogakukan	Shōnen	52	2004–2017	22 million†
Hoshin Engi	Ryu Fujisaki	Shueisha	Shōnen	23	1996–2000	22 million†
Made in Abyss	Akihito Tsukushi	Takeshobo	Shōnen	14	2012–present	22 million†
Swan	Kyoko Ariyoshi	Shueisha	Shōjo	21	1976–1981	22 million†
Terra Formars	Yū Sasuga, Kenichi Tachibana	Shueisha	Seinen	23	2011–present	22 million† (Note: Includes light novel and spin-off series)
Dōbutsu no Oisha-san	Noriko Sasaki	Hakusensha	Shōjo	12	1987–1993	21.6 million†
Osu! Karate Club	Koji Takahashi	Shueisha	Seinen	43	1985–1996	21 million†
Rookies	Masanori Morita	Shueisha	Shōnen	24	1998–2003	21 million†
Tsubasa: Reservoir Chronicle	Clamp	Kodansha	Shōnen	28	2003–2009	21 million
Dragon Quest: The Mark of Erdick	Chiaki Kawamata, Junji Koyanagi, Kamui Fujiwara	Enix	Shōnen	21	1991–1997	20.9 million†
Soul Eater	Atsushi Ohkubo	Square Enix	Shōnen	25	2004–2013	20.4 million†
Shōnen Shōjo Nippon no Rekishi	Kōta Kodama, Arakawa Shoji	Shogakukan	Children	24	1981–2018	20.2 million†
750 Rider	Isami Ishii	Akita Shoten	Shōnen	50	1975–1985	20 million†
Buddha	Osamu Tezuka	Ushio Shuppan	Seinen	14	1972–1983	20 million†
Cat's Eye	Tsukasa Hojo	Shueisha	Shōnen	18	1981–1985	20 million†
Cuffs – Kizu Darake no Chizu	Jin Tojo	Shueisha	Seinen	32	1997–2005	20 million†
Dr. Stone	Riichiro Inagaki, Boichi	Shueisha	Shōnen	27	2017–2022	20 million†‡
Fire Force	Atsushi Ohkubo	Kodansha	Shōnen	34	2015–2022	20 million†
Food Wars!: Shokugeki no Soma	Yūto Tsukuda, Shun Saeki	Shueisha	Shōnen	36	2012–2019	20 million†
Haruhi Suzumiya	Makoto Mizuno, Gaku Tsugano, Puyo, Eretto	Kadokawa Shoten	Shōnen	20	2005–2013	20 million† (Note: Includes the original light novel and all its spin-off manga)
Kaiju No. 8	Naoya Matsumoto	Shueisha	Shōnen	16	2020–2025	20 million† (Note: Includes spin-off manga series, Kaiju No. 8: B-Side & Kaiju No. 8: Relax)
Keiji	Keiichiro Ryu, Tetsuo Hara	Shueisha	Shōnen	18	1990–1993	20 million†
Kimagure Orange Road	Izumi Matsumoto	Shueisha	Shōnen	18	1984–1987	20 million†
Love Hina	Ken Akamatsu	Kodansha	Shōnen	14	1998–2001	20 million†
Master Keaton	Naoki Urasawa, Hokusei Katsushika, Takashi Nagasaki	Shogakukan	Seinen	18	1988–1994	20 million†
Mazinger Z	Go Nagai	Shueisha; Kodansha	Shōnen	5	1972–1974	20 million†
Monster	Naoki Urasawa	Shogakukan	Seinen	18	1994–2001	20 million
Negima! Magister Negi Magi	Ken Akamatsu	Kodansha	Shōnen	38	2003–2012	20 million†
Peacock King	Makoto Ogino	Shueisha; Shogakukan; Leed	Seinen	45	1985–2019	20 million† (Note: Includes Kujaku Ō, and its sequel series; Kujaku Ō: Taima Seiden, Kujaku Ō: Magari Gamiki, and Kujaku Ō: Sengoku Tensei)
The Quintessential Quintuplets	Negi Haruba	Kodansha	Shōnen	14	2017–2020	20 million†
Record of Ragnarok	Shinya Umemura, Takumi Fukui, Azychika	Coamix	Seinen	28	2017–present	20 million†
Red River	Chie Shinohara	Shogakukan	Shōjo	28	1995–2002	20 million†
Shōnen Ashibe	Hiromi Morishita	Shueisha	Seinen	8	1988–1994	20 million
Sukeban Deka	Shinji Wada	Hakusensha	Shōjo	22	1976–1982	20 million†
Tokyo Daigaku Monogatari	Tatsuya Egawa	Shogakukan	Seinen	34	1992–2001	20 million†
Weed	Yoshihiro Takahashi	Nihon Bungeisha	Seinen	60	1999–2009	20 million†
Welcome to Demon School! Iruma-kun	Osamu Nishi	Akita Shoten	Shōnen	49	2017–present	20 million†‡

== See also ==
- List of anime series by episode count
- List of best-selling comic series
- List of best-selling light novels
- List of highest-grossing media franchises
- List of Japanese manga magazines by circulation
- List of The New York Times Manga Best Sellers
- Weekly Shōnen Jump circulation figures
