= UFO Warrior Dai Apolon =

Japanese anime television series

- UFO Warrior Daiapolon
- Screenshot from UFO Warrior Daiapolon

UFO 戦士ダイアポロン (Yūfō senshi daiaporon)
- Genre: Mecha
- Anime television series
- Directed by: Tatsuo Ono
- Written by: Chikara Matsumoto; Noboru Shiroyama; Seiji Matsuoka; Sōji Yoshikawa; Takao Koyama
- Studio: Eiken
- Original network: TBS (part 1); Tokyo 12 Channel (part 2)
- Original run: April 6, 1976 – February 24, 1977
- Episodes: 47

UFO Warrior Daiapolon (UFO戦士ダイアポロン, Yūfō Senshi Dai Aporon) is a Japanese mecha anime television series that was produced by Eiken. There were 47 episodes aired at 25 minutes each. It is also known as "UFO Senshi Dai-Apolon", "UFO Soldier Dai-Apolon", "UFO Robo Dai-Apolon", "Daiapolon", "Shadow World".

== Synopsis ==
The series is about a 16-year-old boy Takeshi who recently formed an American football team at the Blue Sky orphanage. One day the game is interrupted by a light in the sky. Takeshi discovers he is the son of the king of the planet Apolon, spirited away to Earth by his father's retainer Labi to avoid death at the hands of General Dazaan. He turns out to have special energy abilities which can control UFO saucers from a base under the ocean floor.

His friends Miki, Matsuo and Goro also become pilots. They magically change into their uniforms every time they yell U! F! O!. There are three robots: Header (Head); Trangur (Trunk) and Legger (Leg). They combine into a larger and powerful robot called Daiapolon. Through a solar-powered process known as "body fusion", activated by the "Key Energy" device placed inside the boy's chest, Takeshi can "grow" in mass and become a giant humanoid, thus "wearing" the Daiapolon as a kind of cybernetical armour.

== Development ==
The anime was loosely based on the manga Galactic Warrior Apolon by creator Tetsu Kariya (which also created the manga Oishinbo) and illustrator Shigeru Tsuchiyama (serialized in Shōnen Gahōsha's Weekly Shonen King, which also serialized the first run of the Galaxy Express 999 manga). That manga featured a 15-year-old orphan called Akira. Although there are UFO scenes in the manga, it did not have the American football or super robot elements, and the enemies were demons with the power of the 108 Stars of Destiny. It was unusual for the football element to be added, since the sport was barely even recognized as an amateur sport in Japan in the mid 1970s. It may just be a coincidental blend to add variety to the super robot genre.

The original run ended at 26 episodes, followed by 21 episodes of UFO Warrior Dai Apolon II. Some episodes of this combined new footage and re-edited footage from the first series, and the rest were reruns.

== English release ==
Five episodes were combined and dubbed in English to create a re-edited movie called Shadow World. The setting was changed to California and the names of the protagonists were changed to American ones, although Dai Apolon and some of the villains kept their names. This movie was released on video in 1986.

== Voice actors ==
Character	Original	English
Narrator	Osamu Ichikawa	John Mayer
Takeshi/Terry	Akira Murayama	Richard Rossner
Goro/Grey	Keisuke Yamashita	Gregg Berger
Miki/Mickey	Kazue Komiya	Marla Scott
Matsuo/Mark	Sachiko Chijimatsu	Mona Marshall
Hideki/Harold	Kiyoshi Komiyama	Robert A. Gaston
Principal/Ms. Johnson	Miyoko Shoji	Laura Mendoza
Giraniku/Garano	Shōzō Iizuka	Paul Ross
Joketsu/Josephine	Kazuko Sawada	Marla Scott
Emperor Dazan	Toshiya Sugita	Bunker Jenkins
Rabi/Largo	Junji Chiba	John Mayer

== Staff ==
- Director
  Tatsuo Ono
- Screenwriter
  Takao Koyama
  Okihara Matsumoto
  Noboru Shiroyama
  Soji Yoshikawa
  Seiji Matsuoka
- Creator
  Tetsu Kariya
- Design
  Toyoo Ashida
- Animation
  Keiichiro Kimura
  Takashi Kakuta
  Konio Okoto
  Toyoo Ashida
- Music
  Masahisa Takeichi
  Masayuki Yamamoto
