= Someone Hertz =

Japanese manga series

- First tankōbon volume cover, featuring Kurage Mizuo

さむわんへるつ (Samuwan Herutsu)
- Genre: Romantic comedy
- Manga
- Written by: Ei Yamano
- Published by: Shueisha
- English publisher: NA: Viz Media
- Imprint: Jump Comics
- Magazine: Weekly Shōnen Jump
- Original run: September 16, 2025 – present
- Volumes: 5

Someone Hertz (Japanese: さむわんへるつ, Hepburn: Samuwan Herutsu) is a Japanese manga series written and illustrated by Ei Yamano. It has been serialized in Shueisha's shōnen manga magazine Weekly Shōnen Jump since September 2025. As of October 2026, five volumes have been released. The manga follows the extracurricular activities of two contemporary high school students who are dedicated fans of a late night comedy radio show. It won the 2026 Next Manga Award in the print manga category.

== Plot ==
Mimei and Kurage listen regularly to the weekly late-night radio show Monday Midnight Talking (Mon-Mid), which features the hosts The Long Hopes, a manzai duo consisting of Osera and Koyama, reading jokes submitted by listeners on air. Mimei, who succeeds at nearly everything he tries, has never had a joke read on air, and idolizes an amateur comic who uses the pen name "Eel Potato" and has a submission read nearly every week. After his friend Kurage confesses to being "Eel Potato", she adds that she will not date anyone who is less funny than her. Is his renewed motivation (and her encouragement) to have his submissions read on-air born out of his frustration, her sense of competition, or from genuine romantic interest?

== Characters ==
=== Main characters ===
Mimei Fukumori (梟森未明) / "Owl in the Woods" (「森にふくろう」, Mori ni Fukurō)
Voiced by: Kazuki Ura (PV and voiced comic)
A serious, studious second-year student who is at the top of the class academically and athletically, but has a significant deficit of his secret passion, comedy. Since discovering Mon-Mid while studying for high school entrance exams, he has submitted jokes diligently for three years under the pen name "Owl in the Woods", but none of them have been read on the air.
Kurage Mizuo (水尾海月) / "Eel Potato" (「うなぎポテト」, Unagi Poteto)
Voiced by: Saku Mizuno (PV and voiced comic)
Kurage is quick with a pun when speaking with other students and despite assumptions, does not have a boyfriend, vowing that she will not go out with anyone who is less funny than her pen name, "Eel Potato", who has won a minor following through her submissions to Mon-Mid.

=== Other listeners ===
Natsu Akabane (赤羽ナツ) / "Bat Bahtz-Waru" (「バットばつ悪」, Batto Batsu Waru)
A 22-year-old entrepreneur who runs a cafe; Natsu expresses some jealousy over Mimei's relationship with Mizuo. She met Mizuo at the previous Listener Koshien, a competition between the top ten submitters, determined by the number of entries read on-air; she uses the pen name "Bat Bahtz-Waru".
Shuri Ebina (海老奈 シュリ) / "Shrimp Sushi" (「えびのおすし」, Ebi no o Sushi)
An 18-year-old fan of Mon-Mid who fell just behind Eel Potato in the prior listener Koshien. She is socially awkward, having no one in real life with which to share her love of comedy.
Torano Karino (狩野 虎乃) / "Iron Man of Cold Chinese Noodles" (「冷やし中華の鉄人」, Hiyashichūka no Tetsujin)
A 27-year-old advertising agency employee
Shintaro Shirokuma (城熊 晋太郎) / "Don't Pass Middle Infield" (「抜けないで二遊間」, Nukenai de Niyūkan), later "Don't Leave the Team, Middle Reliever"
A 19-year-old part-timer and serious baseball fan; he later changes his on-air name, prompting the Long Hopes to ask what is happening to his team.
(?) / "Eight Guys in a Four-and-a-Half-Mat Room" (「四畳半に8人」, Yojōhan ni 8-ri)
His identity and age are unknown, as he showed up to a public meeting wearing a paper bag over his head
Ryuji Kamakiri (鎌桐 竜司) / "Chupet of Love" (「恋のチューペット」, Koi no Chūpetto)
A 23-year-old researcher. Chupet is a soft drink which was packaged in a tubular polyethylene container, popularly frozen and sold as a freezie until it was discontinued in 2009 due to manufacturing issues.
Ryusuke Nekota (猫田 良介) / "Super Town Mayor" (「超町長」, Chō Chōchō)
A 42-year-old employee of the town hall
Hideto Miyamoto (宮本 英人) / "Hateful Eight" (「ヘイトフルエイト」, Heitofurueito)
A professional comedian who belongs to the same agency as the Long Hopes
Mokomo Watanuki (綿貫 もこも) / "Do Gummies Count as Snacks" (「グミはお菓子に入りますか？」, Gumi wa okashi ni hairimasu ka?)
A cheerful girl who is a fan of the Long Hopes and regularly submits entries.
Reiji Takayama (鷹山 零時) / "Noise-Canceling Junkie" (「ノイズキャンセリングジャンキー」, Noizukyanseringujankī)
The childhood friend of Mokomo who has been submitting entries to Mon-Mid solely for his resume, as he wants to work in media. He is rather direct.

=== Mon-Mid ===
Long Hopes (ロングホープズ)
The Long Hopes are a comedy duo who host Monday Midnight Talking; they are Osera (大瀬良) and Koyama (小山). Osera is taller and wears glasses and a beard. They are alumni of same high school as Mimei and Kurage.
Inami (伊波)
Inami is the scriptwriter and producer of Mon-Mid.
Midran (ミドラン)
The mascot of Mon-Mid is a radio-loving kaiju.

== Publication ==
Written and illustrated by Ei Yamano, the series began serialization in Shueisha's shōnen manga magazine Weekly Shōnen Jump on September 16, 2025. As of October 2, 2026, the series' individual chapters have been collected into five tankōbon volumes.

Viz Media and Manga Plus are publishing the series in English simultaneously with its Japanese release.

A collaboration with the late-night radio show All Night Nippon was held to commemorate the release of the first volume.

=== Volumes ===
No.	Release date	ISBN
1	January 5, 2026	978-4-08-884815-0
1. "On-Air Name: Eel Potato" (ラジオネーム うなぎポテト, Rajio Nēmu Unagi Poteto); 2. "You Are Funny" (面白いよね, Omoshiroi yo ne); 3. "Tired of Walking" (歩くの疲れた, Aruku no Tsukareta); 4. "Fun Duo" (たのしいふたり, Tanoshī Futari); 5. "Matching Pair" (お揃い, O Soroi); 6. "I'm Double Dribbling" (私はダブルドリブル, Watashi wa Daburudoriburu); 7. "After All, I'm a Rival" (ライバルだから, Raibarudakara)
Mimei is shocked to learn his friend and fellow Mon-Mid fan Kurage is the famed on-air contributor "Eel Potato". She advises him to send in multiple submissions, and his joke is read on-air for the first time. They aim to enter the Listener Kōshien, despite her huge lead. To research the week's prompt, Kurage invites Mimei to karaoke; once again, her submission makes it to air. Because Mimei realizes he needs experience to write better jokes, Kurage takes Mimei to a cafe run by her friend, Natsu Akabane ("Bat Bahtz-Waru"), who promptly puts both to work. Mimei and Kurage shop for radios with their cafe wages and pick a matching set. Later, one of his jokes is read on air, while hers is not. For the Ball Game Festival at school, Mimei competes in soccer and Kurage is drafted onto the basketball team. When he sees her practicing alone, he teaches her while they listen to an old Mon-Mid episode which had three entries read on-air from Eel Potato. To their surprise, the next prompt involves basketball. Kurage's friends ask if she is dating Mimei; he overhears and wonders how he feels. After running into each other at the convenience store, Kurage asks if he has started to hate Mon-Mid, but his glum attitude is from missing out on collaborative merchandise. They visit Natsu together, who gives them some of the sold-out merchandise, and later that night, congratulate each other, as they each had one joke read on-air.
2	March 4, 2026	978-4-08-884869-3
8. "Friend?" (ともだち？, Tomodachi?); 9. "Bad Kid" (悪い子, Warui Ko); 10. "I Don't Remember" (覚えてないよ, Oboetenai yo); 11. "Let's Swap" (交換しよ, Kōkan Shiyo); 12. "Sense of Connection" (繋がってる感, Tsunagatteru-kan); 13. "Can't Delete It" (消せないよ, Kesenai yo); 14. "Expected Person" (待ち人, Machibito); 15. "Semifinals" (準決勝, Junkesshō); 16. "Baka Majime" (ばかまじめ, Baka Majime)
Shuri Ebina, aka "Shrimp Sushi", another Mon-Mid fan, confronts Kurage, but she does not react until Shuri calls Mimei "some random listener". The trio research that week's prompt at an arcade and form an awkward friendship. After Kurage tells Mimei that he can't be funny by being a good kid all the time, they run to the fifth anniversary Mon-Mid event through the rain, which wrinkles their stickers; Kurage does not regret the memories. The Long Hopes mention them on-air as a soaked high school couple they passed who were obviously having fun; Mimei fears Kurage is acting strange because of that call-out, but she is suffering from a cold. He takes her to the nurse's office and walks her home after school. Kurage passes a makeup quiz in math using his mechanical pencil, which she claims absorbed his diligence, so in exchange, she gives Mimei her joke writing pen. Mimei and Kurage submit jokes with postcards due to phone issues; Kurage's joke is read and Mimei's thanks are shared privately among the Mon-Mid staff, who notice the postcards came from the same neighborhood. Kurage and Mimei return to Natsu's cafe and buy a disposable camera to research the latest topic; Natsu asks Mimei to photograph Kurage while they find the Mon-Mid mascot Midran at the neighboring shopping mall. Kurage takes a picture of Mimei for the last frame. With only four points, Mimei fails to qualify for the Listener Kōshien. After school, they run into Shuri, who drops her Line contact information and an Omamori amulet, inspiring Kurage to visit the same shrine, where Mimei prays for her success, receiving "small luck". She prays that he will join her in the next competition next time and pulls "expected person", auguring well. For the Listener Kōshien semi-final, ten contestants each submit ten entries and the three with the most read on-air advance to the finals. Kurage, buoyed by Mimei's cheering, gets one more than Shuri, advancing to the final with "Hateful Eight" and last year's winner, "Battle Chimney". Kurage asks Mimei to listen to the finals together; when he is surprised she is being shut out, he hurries over to encourage her.
3	May 1, 2026	978-4-08-885037-5
17. "I'd Say I'm a Corn Dog" (私でいうアメリカンドッグ, Watashi de iu Amerikan Doggu); 18. "Samesies" (被った, Kabutta); 19. "Leave It as Dark History" (黒歴史にしてよ, Kokurekishi ni Shite yo); 20. "What She Wants" (欲しいもの, Hoshīmono); 21. "Master Eel Potato" (うなぎポテト師匠, Unagi Poteto Shishō); 22. "A Guy Who's Not Funny Yet" (まだ面白くない奴, Mada Omoshirokunai Yakko); 23. "Once Summer Break Hits" (夏休みになったら, Natsuyasumi ni Nattara); 24. "Mizudran" (水ドラン, Mizudoran); 25. "What Do You Think?" (どう思ってる?, Dō Omotteru?)
Although she staged a remarkable comeback, Kurage finishes second to "Battle Chimney". She calmly asks Mimei to push her on the swings, where he initially does not see her crying and when he does, he comforts her by offering some tissues. He vows to compete as her peer, and the next day, she says the next Listener Koshien has started. Mimei picks up some products used by the Long Hopes; at school, he panics when he sees Kurage has matching items, fearing he is being too forward; she says she noticed and wants more matching things. To research the next prompt, Kurage studies "all-too-perfect" Mimei as he goes through a typical day, admiring his perspicacity. They each have an entry read that night on Mon-Mid. Mimei researches a prompt for his friend Nakatani by shopping for a present for a girl. At the mall, he runs into Kurage, who invites him to a meetup for Mon-Mid Listener Koshien contestants. Kurage misses the start of the meetup to make up a math test; in her absence, Mimei's awkwardness evaporates after introducing himself as "Eel Potato"'s disciple. After Kurage shows up late, Mimei runs an errand for Natsu. Outside, he meets "Hateful Eight", a professional comedian who describes himself as "not funny at all", recognizing the same characteristics in Mimei and encouraging him to keep working to beat "Eel Potato". Walking home together, Kurage tells Mimei that right now she is the only one who knows how funny he is. Mimei hits a submission slump as the summer school break starts; walking home, they duck into a Saizeriya restaurant for lunch to wait out a sudden rainstorm. After their meal, they are stunned by a vivid rainbow and Mimei nervously proposes weekly listening meetings together, to which Kurage readily agrees. The next week, they attend the Tozai Radio Festival and run into a fellow Mon-Mid Listener Koshien contestant Torano Karino, who is running an event using Midran, the Mon-Mid mascot, to sell a new drink. Kurage steps in to portray Chef Midran. She slips coming off the stage, but Mimei catches her by the hands; is her face flushed only from the heat of the costume? Torano assumes that Kurage is Mimei's girlfriend, which he quickly denies. As research for the next topic, Mimei asks Kurage to visit a summer festival together, then frets he is being too forward. When he arrives, wearing a yukata, she is already working at Natsu's yakisoba stall alongside Natsu's grandpa. Natsu loans Kurage an old yukata and Mimei proves to be an able paper net fisherman while Kurage's efforts go awry. When they try to watch the fireworks with Natsu, they are separated by the crowd.
4	August 4, 2026	978-4-08-885135-8
26. "Their World" (2人の世界, Futari no Seki); 27. "Its My Fault" (私のせいで, Watashi no Sei de); 28. "I'm a Rival Too?" (俺もライバル?, Ore mo Raibaru?); 29. "Deliciousness is Love" (おいしさは愛, Oishi-sa wa Ai); 30. "Perfect Attendance Award" (皆勤賞, Kaikin-shō); 31. "There Were This Many People" (こんなにいたんだ, Konnani Itanda); 32. "It's All Right" (大丈夫, Daijōbu); 33. "Proper Silly" (ちゃんとばか, Chanto Baka); 34. "Gyoza" (餃子, Gyōza)
While separated, Kurage helps a lost dog; the Mon-Mid episode helps them reconnect at the Baby Castella stand, where they enjoy the fireworks. Kurage suggests they can repair Mimei's sandal at her home. Outside her building, Kurage patches up Mimei's scrapes and applies a bandage with a handwritten message of encouragement, which he finds while writing submissions. She continues to drop hints about her interest, as she filed their selfie with Midran in her "folder of important stuff". They each have one submission read the following Monday. Mimei forces Kurage to finish her homework at Cafe Akabane, where they run into a new part-timer: Shuri, who is surprisingly tied with Mimei at three points and calls Mimei a rival; after Shuri's shift, she confesses she planned to stop submitting and study for college entrance exams, but Kurage's effort inspired her to keep competing. Kurage reassures Mimei that he has earned his rival status. Mon-Mid celebrates its two-year anniversary with a special episode featuring trivia questions mocking Osera. Although Mimei knows most of the answers, he hesitates; he memorized one answer because he listened to that episode with Kurage. The pair join morning neighborhood radio calisthenics for a week to research the current topic; reluctant and arrhythmic at first, Kurage gradually improves. Mimei oversleeps and misses the last day, but Kurage gives him a personal exercise session and "stamps" his palm (as an ersatz attendance card) with her finger; the physical contact results in mutual blushes. Outside the Mon-Mid live event, Mimei and Kurage help a middle schooler find a lost ticket, making them slightly late to get in; the Long Hopes offer a personal, friendly greeting, raising their spirits. Mimei, surprised by the size of the crowd, confides to Kurage that he was depressed while studying for high school entrance exams, and Mon-Mid helped him realize he was not alone; Kurage says the show was always this popular, even if only a handful regularly submit entries, and reassures him that she is also present. Kurage and Mimei are seated next to another high school pair: Mokomo ("Do Gummies Count as Snacks") and Rei ("Noise-Canceling Junkie"). During the show, the Long Hopes read ten listener entries; both Kurage and Rei are included. Rei pointedly asks Mimei if he would keep listening after the Listener Koshien, and Mimei replies that only those with a weak attachment to the show would do so. Kurage admires his cool response and reminds Mimei about the Rookie Round, which is a Listener Koshien limited to listeners with less than five points; he vows to win. To help Mimei, Kurage proposes they do all the potential summer activities in a single day at a dude ranch where Natsu is running an onsite cafe, catching a ride with her. On the way there, Natsu is dismayed to hear all the times Mimei and Kurage have hung out together, and Mimei is surprised to hear Natsu call their outings dates. Kurage leads him through a series of fun activities, including wading in a river, gobbling soft serve, sliding down a hill, feeding goats, and wandering through a field of tall sunflowers, advising him to abandon any sense of shame that would keep him from enjoying them. He asks why funny people are cool even when doing uncool things, and she replies that anyone who gives their all is inherently cool; she approves of his effort that day, calling him "properly silly". She volunteers to grab his lost hat, leading to another physical encounter. The exhausted couple fall asleep on the way home, leaning in toward each other, and Natsu, who won the rookie round four years ago, wishes Mimei good luck reluctantly. As part of her summer homework, Kurage writes her favorite food (gyoza) in calligraphy at Natsu's cafe, where they meet up with Mokomo and Rei before the rookie round starts. The four are drafted into searching for a lost parrot who belongs to a fellow Mon-Mid fan. Mokomo tells Kurage that Rei helped write her entries to win the exclusive keychains. Rei tells Mimei he wants to make Mokomo see him as a romantic prospect instead of just a friend; he recognizes the same effort in Mimei. As the rookie round starts, Kurage realizes that should Mimei win, he will be awarded five points, moving into a tie with her.
5	October 2, 2026	978-4-08-885203-4
35. "Mimei Fukumori's Radio Days, Part 1" (梟森未明のラジオデイズ①, Fukurō Mori Mimei no Rajiodeizu 1); 36. "Mimei Fukumori's Radio Days, Part 2" (梟森未明のラジオデイズ②, Fukurō Mori Mimei no Rajiodeizu 2); 37. "Beet Red" (真っ赤, Makka); 38. "Watch This" (見てなね, Mite na ne); 39. "On A Roll" (調子のいい日, Chōshinoī-bi); 40. "A Fight with Your Belt" (おどれとの戦い, O Dore to Notatakai); 41. "It's Kurageeee" (くらげや〜〜♡, Kurage ya 〜〜♡); 42. "Whatta Mess" (えらいこっちゃ, Erai Kotcha); 43. "Evolving Each Day" (進化する日々, Shinka Suru Hibi)
After reading a prompt on-air, "rookie" listeners of Mon-Mid submit jokes over the next half hour; the most jokes broadcast wins. Mimei recalls how he discovered the show two years ago: while studying for the Elite High entrance exams, his fears of disappointing everyone left him feeling alone when he chanced on Mon-Mid. When he learned that "Eel Potato" is his age, he applied to South High instead, where he met Kurage, who confessed to being "Eel Potato". Encouraged by his memories, he secures first place by remembering Kurage's advice to be silly; Rei places third and is about to give up entirely on Mon-Mid until he receives on-air praise as a rookie who only just started. Mimei meets Kurage at the park to celebrate. Mimei goes to great lengths to conceal any hint he and Kurage know each other. For the new term, he is seated directly behind her and their undeniable mutual attraction leads to blushing public denials. Bowling together, Kurage says she wants to support him, but still wants to be number one. That week, she advances from their tied scores, having two entries read on-air, while he is shut out. During Tozai Radio's music week, listeners submit song requests, which will be played between programs. When Kurage's request is selected, they also announce the reason for her choice, namely that something really wonderful happened the day it was played, which Mimei recalls as his first on-air joke submission. Mokomo invites Kurage to a restaurant offering a portion challenge to help Rei prepare for a mukbang, where the two near-couples each order the 4 kg (8.8 lb) challenge hamburger for pairs. Kurage returns from the restroom and polishes off the remainder, while Rei was unable to finish the last bite. Mimei uses the gift certificates he won to buy Rei a radio. When they part, Kurage observes that Mimei now has a personal rival. Natsu spots and follows Kurage and Mimei, trying to figure out if they are truly dating; just as their actions start to cause Natsu irreversible anxiety, they present her with gifts they made for her birthday. Kurage calls her cute and funny and on their way out, Natsu asks Mizuo again if they are dating; he explains that Kurage will not love anyone who is less funny than "Eel Potato". The Long Hopes note that "Bad Bahtz-Waru" has suddenly started submitting many entries. Kurage is drafted into setting up a haunted house for the upcoming school culture festival; Mimei is briefly tempted to take advantage of her sudden workload, thinking it may prevent her from submitting any entries, but his conscience wins and he helps her through the chores. That Monday night, he confesses he was too busy to send in any entries; Kurage tells him her extracurricular work became lighter, and she continues to pull ahead. The truth behind Osera's participation in his school festival is revealed: he was not on the official planning committee, but volunteered to help the cutest girl in school, making Mimei blush by seeing his own actions mirrored. Kurage, who volunteered to run in the class relay race, seeks tutelage from Mimei, but he has a prior engagement to coach another student. She runs into Shuri and obtains advice from her instead; after Kurage and Mimei meet during training, they walk home together to discuss recent developments.

=== Chapters not yet in tankōbon format ===
These chapters have yet to be published in a tankōbon volume.

44. "The Phantom of Minami Town" (南町の怪異, Minami-machi no Kaii)
45. "Might Be Terrible!" (まずいかも!, Mazui Kamo)
46. "The Night Before" (前夜, Zenya)
47. "You Sure Have Won My Heart" (好きだな…, Sukida na...)
48. "What Did You Say?" (なんて言ってた?, Nante Itteta?)
49. "Two Ghosts" (2おばけ, Ni-obake)
50. "Even Though I'm the Student Council President!" (生徒会長なのに!, Seito Kaichōnanoni!)
51. "Wrap-Up Party" (打ち上げ, Uchiage)
52. "Between Radio and Work" (ラジオと仕事と, Rajio to Shigoto to)
53. "Likes" (好きなもの, Suki na Mono)
54. "Senpai" (先輩たち, Senpai-tachi)
55. "Memories of Nacchi" (なっちの思い出, Nacchi no Omoide)
56. "Proactive Mini Soup Bean" (積極性ミニつけ麺, Sekkyoku-sei Mini Tsuke-men)
57. "See You Later"
58. "Wall"

== Reception ==
Kittun Nozomi of Real Sound felt that the comedy was more relaxed than Akane-banashi and Beshari-Gurashi, two other comedy manga published in Weekly Shōnen Jump. They also liked the focus on the late-night radio subculture and the story's setting. Radio personality Hikaru Ijūin discussed the manga during an episode of his show.

The pre-orders for the first volume sold out on Amazon Japan. By May 2026, the series had 300,000 copies in circulation. By August 2026, the series had 500,000 copies in circulation between its print and digital editions.

The series won the 12th Next Manga Award in 2026 in the print category.
