= Fisherman Sanpei =

Japanese manga series

- Cover of the first tankōbon volume, featuring Sanpei Mihira

釣りキチ三平 (Tsurikichi Sanpei)
- Manga
- Written by: Takao Yaguchi
- Published by: Kodansha
- Magazine: Weekly Shōnen Magazine
- Original run: 1973 – 1983
- Volumes: 65
- Manga
- Written by: Takao Yaguchi
- Published by: Kodansha
- Original run: 2002 – 2010
- Volumes: 12
- Anime television series
- Directed by: Yoshikata Nitta
- Studio: Nippon Animation
- Original network: FNS (Fuji TV)
- Original run: April 7, 1980 – June 28, 1982
- Episodes: 109

Fisherman Sanpei (Japanese: 釣りキチ三平, Hepburn: Tsurikichi Sanpei) is a Japanese manga written and illustrated by Takao Yaguchi. The manga was serialised in Kodansha's Weekly Shōnen Magazine from 1973 to 1983. Kodansha has published the manga's 65 bound volumes between February 18, 1974, and May 16, 1983.

The manga was adapted into an 109-episode anime series. Directed by Yoshikata Nitta, the anime's 109 episodes were broadcast on Fuji TV between April 7, 1980, and June 28, 1982. The official English name is Fisherman Sanpei.

As of October 2020, the Fisherman Sanpei manga had over 50 million copies in circulation, making it one of the best-selling manga series.

== Plot ==
Raised by his wise grandfather, Sanpei spends much of his time exploring rivers, lakes, and mountains in search of fish, gradually developing his angling skills.

Although fishing is the central theme, the series is really about personal growth. Each journey introduces Sanpei to new people, environments, and challenges. He encounters experienced fishermen, talented rivals, and legendary fish that test not only his technical ability but also his character. Through success and failure, he learns perseverance, humility, patience, and respect for nature.

Unlike many sports-oriented stories, Sanpei's victories rarely come from strength alone. He succeeds by observing carefully, learning from others, adapting to changing conditions, and refusing to give up when confronted with setbacks. Every fish becomes a puzzle, and every expedition teaches him something about himself and the world around him.

The series also highlights the beauty and diversity of Japan's natural landscapes. Rivers, lakes, forests, and mountain streams are portrayed with great detail, emphasizing the close relationship between people and the environment. Fishing is depicted not merely as a hobby or competition, but as a way of understanding nature and appreciating its complexity.

At its heart, Fisherman Sanpei is the story of a curious and determined boy searching for mastery, adventure, and meaning. The lessons he learns from fishing extend far beyond the water, shaping him into a resilient, thoughtful, and compassionate young man. The anime combines adventure, education, and heartfelt storytelling, making it much more than a simple fishing series.

In essence, Fisherman Sanpei is a tale of growth, perseverance, and the lifelong pursuit of knowledge, told through the eyes of a boy whose love for fishing opens the door to countless lessons about life.

== Characters ==
- Sanpei Mihira (三平三平)
- Ippei Mihira (三平 一平)
- Gyoshin Ayukawa (鮎川魚紳)
- Masaharu Kase (加瀬 正治)
- Yuri Takayama (高山 ユリ)

== Anime ==
The anime uses two pieces of theme song. "Wakaki Tabibito" (若き旅人) by MoJo is the series' opening theme, while "Ore wa tsurikichi Sanpei da" (おれは釣りキチ三平だ) also by MoJo is the series' ending theme. An OVA called まんがビデオシリーズ 釣りキチ三平 was released in 2001 on VHS only.

=== Episode list ===
1. Monster of Yonaki (夜泣き谷の怪物)
2. Blue Crucian Carp of the Caldera (カルデラの青鮒)
3. Wild Koi of Mikazukiko (三日月湖の野鯉)
4. The Mitsumatachi Gang (三ツ又池のギャング)
5. The God of Fury Hook (毛バリの神サマ)
6. The Goro Pulling Rascal (ゴロ引きゴンベ)
7. Takitaro of O-ike (池の滝太郎)
8. The King of The Rock (磯の王者)
9. The Tears of Shiro Itsu (シロギスの涙)
10. Saida Iwas Denya (𩹷の原野)
11. Meko Iwa (メッコ岩魚の怪)
12. The Little Fox Near The Fishing Field (釣り場の子ギツネ)
13. Night Catching Kaikatsu (カジカの夜突き)
14. The Monster of Sanga Ike (三角瀞の主)
15. The Sad Song of Zukiga Field ススキ川原エレジー
16. The Sogiyo of Kabura Wata 蕪渡しの草魚
17. The Mini Big Game 小さなビッグゲーム
18. The Rod of Unrest Soul 怨み竿
19. Naboromo Buna of Syunema 幽沼の羽衣鮒
20. The weird fishes in old billabong 古沼の大怪魚
21. The red crucian in cave billabong おっぽり沼の緋鮒
22. The bareheaded in the Bareheaded Bog 坊主沢の沢坊主
23. The universal crucian of the Burn Bog 焼沼の宇宙ブナ
24. The bomb fish of the Youming beach
25. The competition of salmon in Canada
26. The dancer of the lake mountain
27. RCフィッシング
28. The Sakura and Black Cyprinoid 桜吹雪カラス鯉
29. The battle between Raigyo and Kuma-hawk ライギョ対ミサゴ王者の対決
30. The Gold Carp
31. The Blue Flag Marlin of Hawaii
32. The Finger fish in Hand bog 手形沼の指切り魚
33. The Dragon of Dragon Waterfall
34. 蝉しぐれのブラウン
35. The Esa fish after the Northwest rain 驟雨のオトリアユ
36. Fishing dog Shou Hachi
37. The weird rockfish in Shower Valley しぐれ谷の化物イワナ
38. The secret technique of River Zhuchuan 簗川流簗秘伝
39. Battle of Sanpei Syringe 三平式珍ドウ作戦
40. The legend of Ali Crucian お里鮒伝説
41. The dream net 茜屋流小鷹網 幻の投網の巻
42. Aneka eagle net, Kigawa 茜屋流小鷹網 紀ノ川の巻
43. Net in a house; devil but Buddhisms heart. 茜屋流小鷹網 鬼手仏心の巻
44. Kluck sound, brawniness ガッチンがん鉄
45. Killer of the lake, Black rocket launcher 湖の殺し屋ブラックバス
46. Maple leaf dike big rainbow trout 紅葉堤の大ニジマス
47. Rintaros great carp 太郎沼の巨鯉
48. Fishing mother 1553 フィッシングかあちゃん
49. Instruction fish fishing law トモ釣り伝授
50. Golden Valleys Gold fish 黄金谷のキンイワナ
51. Red Eddy Fish and The Famous Fishing-Rod アカブチと幻の名竿
52. Fight Bravely At The Pond Fishing 釣り堀奮戦記
53. Fighting Of The Transplantation Of Rock Fish イワナ大移植作戦
54. Fishing The Egret Fish In The Ice Cave ワカサギの氷穴釣り
55. Red Dragonfly Fishing Method Of 1 Meter Long Dragon Fish 尺バヤのアカネ釣り
56. ペンペン釣りとポカン釣り
57. Use The Wood Toon To Tooning The Guqi Fish クキのドン突き
58. The Big Black Silver Carp 幻の大魚コクレン
59. Secret Of The Fire Rock 火の石の謎
60. Lakes Monster Of Nian Zhu Lake 念珠湖のネッシー
61. Fossil Fishing Way 石化け
62. Fighting With Carp 巨鯉釣り大作戦
63. Secret Method! Reed Rod 秘技!ススキ釣り
64. Gold colour trout - Golden Trout 黄金のマス・ゴールデントラウト
65. Enticement Of Aquatic larva ニンフの誘惑
66. Odd Fish With Vine Cane Flower Look カラクサ模様の怪魚
67. Princess Water 水のプリンセス
68. the magician of the brook Mountain Jade 渓流の魔術師ヤマセミ
69. The summer of the delicious fish 若鮎たちの夏
70. The king of fisherman- The ghost fish 湿原の王者釣り
71. Facing Attack Rockfish Catcher 襲われたイワナ密漁者
72. Hunters superior... Sansi Lang 熊撃ちマタギの三四郎
73. Bulrush fishing-rod to fishing frigid zone Arhat fish 寒バヤのアシ竿釣り
74. Chinese Toon Fish Wujinqiu group ドン突き!たまきんトリオ
75. Fishing Chinese Toon Fish San Ping secret battle ドン突き!三平（秘）作戦
76. Summer Brook - Movement of Sliver crap 春の小川・ギンブナ騒動
77. Lower savory fish Rotate Fishing 落鮎のコロガシ釣り
78. The Strange Fish was Curse 呪い谷の怪奇魚
79. The secret of Flying bird カジカの夜突き・蛍火の謎
80. The Struggle of Worm ケダニ先生奮戦記
81. Aiko, Spread the Wings! 大空へはばたけ、三平!

== Film ==
A live action film adaptation of the manga was released in 2009, starring Kenta Suga, Takashi Tsukamoto and Yuu Kashii. The official English name of this film is Sanpei the Fisher Boy.

== Video games ==
There were two official video games, developed by Victor Musical Industries, and published by Cross Media Soft for MSX home computers and the Famicom:

- Fisherman Sanpei Blue Marine Edition (釣りキチ三平ブルーマリン編) (1988)
- Tsurikichi Sanpei Tsurisennin Hen (釣りキチ三平釣り仙人編) (1989)
