= Kaze Densetsu: Bukkomi no Taku =

Japanese manga series

- First tankōbon volume cover

疾風伝説 特攻の拓
- Genre: Yankī
- Manga
- Written by: Hiroto Saki
- Illustrated by: Jūzō Tokoro
- Published by: Kodansha
- Magazine: Weekly Shōnen Magazine
- Original run: June 19, 1991 – July 23, 1997
- Volumes: 27
- Manga

Kaze Densetsu: Bukkomi no Taku Gaiden – Early Day's
- Written by: Hiroto Saki
- Illustrated by: Jūzō Tokoro
- Published by: Kodansha
- Magazine: Monthly Young Magazine
- Original run: March 9, 2011 – June 12, 2013
- Volumes: 5
- Manga

Kaze Densetsu: Bukkomi no Taku – After Decade
- Written by: Hiroto Saki
- Illustrated by: Shinya Kuwahara
- Published by: Kodansha
- Magazine: Monthly Young Magazine
- Original run: November 28, 2016 – April 28, 2017
- Volumes: 9
- icon

Kaze Densetsu: Bukkomi no Taku (Japanese: 疾風伝説 特攻の拓) is a Japanese manga series written by Hiroto Saki and illustrated by Jūzō Tokoro. It was serialized in Kodansha's Weekly Shōnen Magazine from June 1991 to July 1997, with its chapters collected in 27 tankōbon volumes.

By January 2023, the manga had over 33 million copies in circulation, making it one of the best-selling manga series of all time.

== Publication ==
Written by Hiroto Saki and illustrated by Jūzō Tokoro, Kaze Densetsu: Bukkomi no Taku was serialized in Kodansha's Shōnen manga magazine Weekly Shōnen Magazine from June 19, 1991, to July 23, 1997. Kodansha collected its chapters in 31 tankōbon volumes, published from September 12, 1991, to December 13, 1996. Kodansha republished the series 27 volumes in new print from February 20, 2023, to December 9, 2005.

A spin-off titled Kaze Densetsu: Bukkomi no Taku Gaiden – Early Day's (Note: Japanese: 疾風伝説 特攻の拓 外伝 〜Early Day's〜, 疾風〈かぜ〉伝説 特攻＜ぶっこみ＞の拓 外伝 〜Early Day's〜) was serialized in Kodansha's seinen manga magazine Monthly Young Magazine from March 9, 2011, to June 12, 2013. Kodansha collected its chapters in five volumes, published from September 6, 2011, to April 20, 2022.

A sequel titled Kaze Densetsu: Bukkomi no Taku – After Decade (Note: Japanese: 疾風（かぜ）伝説 特攻（ブッコミ）の拓 ～After Decade～, 疾風伝説特攻の拓~AfterDecade~) written by Hiroto Saki and illustrated by Shinya Kuwahara was serialized in Kodansha's seinen manga magazine Monthly Young Magazine from February 19, 2017, to February 18, 2022. Kodansha collected its chapters in nine volumes, published from August 17, 2017, to April 20, 2022.

== Reception ==
The series and its sequel and spinoff combined have 33 million copies in circulation. It ranked tenth on Anime! Anime!'s "Completed Manga that Most Wanted Anime Adaptation" poll in 2015.
