= Rookies (manga) =

Japanese manga series

- First tankōbon volume cover, featuring Koichi Kawato (front) and the students of the Futagotamaga High School
- Genre: Sports
- Manga
- Written by: Masanori Morita
- Published by: Shueisha
- Imprint: Jump Comics
- Magazine: Weekly Shōnen Jump
- Original run: February 16, 1998 – August 25, 2003
- Volumes: 24
- Television drama
- Directed by: Yuichiro Hirakawa
- Written by: Yoshihiro Izumi
- Music by: Takefumi Haketa; Yu Takami
- Original network: TBS
- Original run: April 19, 2008 – July 26, 2008
- Episodes: 11 + Special
- Live-action film

Rookies: Graduation
- Directed by: Yūichirō Hirakawa
- Studio: Toho
- Released: May 31, 2009
- icon

Rookies (stylized in all caps) is a Japanese manga series written and illustrated by Masanori Morita. It was serialized in Shueisha's shōnen manga magazine Weekly Shōnen Jump from February 1998 to August 2003, with the chapters collected in 24 tankōbon volumes. The manga has been adapted into a television series which was broadcast on TBS between April 19, 2008, and July 26, 2008. The series was later released on DVD by TC Entertainment, and the soundtrack released on June 28, 2008. The finale of the TV series was in the form of a film, called Rookies: Graduation (Rookies－卒業－, Rookies -Sotsugyō) which premiered on Japanese cinemas on May 31, 2009. Rookies is one of the best-selling manga series, with over 21 million copies in circulation.

Rookies is the story of an amateur teacher, Koichi Kawato, who is faced with the challenge of guiding a high school baseball club composed of delinquents. The students are wary of him and often threaten Kawato, but he refuses to abandon them and continuously speaks highly of recognizing their dreams. Eventually, the team is assembled and they dedicate their time to achieve their dream of going to the Koshien Spring baseball tournament.

== Plot ==
Koichi Kawato is the new Japanese teacher at the ill-famed Futakotamagawa High School, whose baseball club is composed of thugs and bullies who have been suspended for a year from all school competitions, for causing a brawl during an official match. The newly appointed teacher finds that the club members left are only interested in women, smoking and doing nothing good until, under Kawato's guidance, they recognize that baseball is what they truly love doing. Kawato also teaches them that they should follow their dreams, and for them, being able to reach the national high school tournament finals in Koshien (Hyogo prefecture) is what they have always wished for. However, reaching Koshien is far from easy as many obstacles await them.

== Characters ==
The names of all the characters are inspired by famous players from the Hanshin Tigers.

=== Teachers ===
Koichi Kawato
Koichi Kawato is a young, optimistic, and highly honorable teacher who strongly believes in following dreams. He also tries to build more personal relationships with his students, even memorizing all their names from the class list. After he promises a student that he would protect the school's baseball team, he becomes the team's advisor. It is later found out he resigned from his last school after getting in a fight with a student, and he vowed never to hit anyone again. Despite this, he was near universally loved at his last school and they try (unsuccessfully) to get him to come back.
Vice Principal Ikebe
Vice Principal Ikebe is a former member of the baseball team who had once made it to Koshien. Though he seemed uptight and strict at first, often lecturing Kawato over the smallest details, he later warms up to Kawato. When the team starts playing again, Ikebe becomes their coach, lending his expertise.
Principal Murayama
Principal Murayama is the former captain of the baseball team from 43 years ago, when the team went to Koshien. He harbors a resentment for the current baseball team as he views them as tarnishing the legacy he left behind, and is willing to do anything to get them all expelled. However, after witnessing their first game against Yoga Daiichi, he starts to regard the baseball team more positively. When Yoga Daiichi's coach threatens to press charges of assault against Kawato for hitting him during their game, Murayama takes the blame for Kawato and resigns.

=== Baseball team ===
Toru Mikoshiba
Toru Mikoshiba is the team's captain. Though non-violent and intelligent, he is often affected by nervousness and insecurity. He does, however, know when to take a stand and lead the team. He was originally the gofer when they were still a team of thugs.
Keiichi Aniya
Keiichi Aniya is the team's primary pitcher. He was well known in middle school, but lost his motivation after a pitcher who had struck him out was unable to strike anyone out at Koshien Stadium. Despite fooling with other girls, he is in love with his childhood friend, Toko Yagi. He once stated that the reason he played around so much was because she would not go out with him. However, after seriously beginning to train for baseball, he has stopped dating so frequently.
Shuta Sekikawa
Shuta Sekikawa is the team's fastest member and sports a mohawk that is "rock hard" due to the amount of styling products he uses. When he lets his hair down (washes the styling products out), his speed increases greatly. He was the second one to be convinced by Kawato to officially join the team, after Mikoshiba.
Kei Shinjo
Kei Shinjo was originally angry at the other members for starting to leave gang-life behind, and proceeded to heavily injure them. He is later revealed to care deeply about his friendship with the team, but was reluctant to rejoin due to his actions. He later rejoins and works twice as hard to make up for his actions. He has great batting abilities, being able to hit a 123 meter line drive. His swing is described as being able to cut through the wind.
Yuya Okada
Yuya Okada is a rational member who keeps his hair in long dreadlocks. He is by far the calmest and wisest among the group, though perhaps not the most mature. It has been mentioned that he gets good grades, along with Mikoshiba and Shinjo.
Tetsuro Yufune
Tetsuro Yufune is a nervous player who uses his batting technique "Cat Swing", in which he screams "Meow" before he hits the ball, to achieve better accuracy. He also has a crush on the English teacher, Rie Mayumi, but he is unable to confess his feelings to her, choosing to jump off a balcony (yelling "meow" like he does when he is nervous) rather than do so.
Kiyooki Hiyama
Kiyooki Hiyama is one of the team's worst batters, often mocked by other teams as "the bearded strikeout king". Although he is short-tempered, he refused to fight against a few boys from Megurogawa attacking him to avoid team disqualification. However, after constant practice, he managed to improve his hitting.
Tomochika Wakana
Tomochika Wakana is the only player able to consistently catch Aniya's pitches, though he originally was unable to keep his eyes open as the ball came to him. With help from Hiyama, Wakana was able to overcome this obstacle. He is considered to be the mood maker of the team.
Taira Hiratsuka
Taira Hiratsuka is a strong member who has almost no skill in baseball. However, he is able to achieve incredible hits by using survival instinct, particularly when a ball is thrown at his head. He is often ignored by his teammates and even Kawato, not out of spite but because they simply do not notice him. He has a huge crush on Toko Yagi after she slapped him for making fun of Shinjo.
Shinobu Imaoka
Shinobu Imaoka is the team's ambidextrous player and considered strange among several of his teammates. He has surprising talent for the sport, having great baseball sense and being able to bat and pitch well. He is close friends with Hiratsuka and refers to him by the nickname "Hiracchi".
Shouji Akaboshi
Shouji Akaboshi is one of two new first years who join after the main group of ten. He is a skilled player who was also well known in middle school, and dreamed of being able to compete in Major League Baseball. At first he seems arrogant, claiming he only needs high school to learn English and refuses to join the baseball team as he views them beneath him. However, he practices with a university team in secret, something Yagi and Aniya accidentally find out. When he is convinced to join the team, he discovers they were all more talented than he thought, leading him to work much harder for his spot on the team.
Hamanaka Taiyou
Hamanaka Taiyou is one of two new first years who join after the main group of ten, being a full year younger than the rest. At first, he is a bully who beats up old men for money. After an encounter with Hiratsuka, he begins to model himself after Hiratsuka, who he believes to be a brilliant player. After realizing the truth, Hamanaka still joins the baseball team, though he is deemed useless.
Toko Yagi
Toko Yagi is the baseball team manager and childhood friend of Aniya, for whom she has romantic feelings. She has great baseball sense and managing capabilities.

== Media ==
=== Manga ===
Written and illustrated by Masanori Morita, Rookies was serialized in Shueisha's Weekly Shōnen Jump from February 16, 1998, to August 25, 2003. Shueisha released the manga in 24 tankōbon volumes between June 4, 1998, and November 4, 2003. It was licensed in France by Editions Tonkam, and in Taiwan by Da Ran Culture before it went bankrupt. The Taiwan license was transferred to Tong Li Publishing. In Italy, Rookies was licensed by Star Comics and serialized in the magazine Express.

=== TV drama ===
The manga was adapted into a live-action Japanese television drama. The series' script was written by Yoshihiro Izumi and was directed by Yuichiro Hirakawa. It was produced by Tsuru Masaaki. Its 11 episodes were broadcast on TBS between April 19, 2008, and July 26, 2008. The series' theme song was "Kiseki" by Greeeen. The first three episodes of the drama were released as a Rookies Omote Box by TC Entertainment on July 18, 2008. Episodes four to eleven were released in a Rookies Ura Box on October 8, 2008. The soundtrack to the drama was released on a CD on June 28, 2008.

==== Cast ====
- Ryuta Sato as Koichi Kawato
- Keisuke Koide as Toru Mikoshiba
- Hayato Ichihara as Keiichi Aniya
- Akiyoshi Nakao as Shuta Sekikawa
- Yu Shirota as Kei Shinjo
- Takeru Satoh as Yuya Okada
- Shunji Igarashi as Tetsuro Yufune
- Sōsuke Takaoka as Tomochika Wakana
- Hiroyuki Onoue as Shinobu Imaoka
- Eri Murakawa as Toko Yagi

=== Film ===
A live-action film, Rookies: Graduation (Rookies－卒業－, Rookies -Sotsugyō-), was adapted from the manga. Created by Toho and directed by Yūichirō Hirakawa, the film premiered on May 31, 2009.

== Reception ==
Rookies was ranked the ninth top-selling manga in Japan in 2008 with 2,765,163 copies sold.

The last episode of Rookies live-action television adaptation, broadcast on July 26, 2008, was rated 19.5 in the average household ratings. The television special episode of Rookies garnered a 10.0 rating. The Rookies Ura Box set sold 5,595 copies during the October 15–21, 2008 weekend. Rookies TV drama DVDs were ranked the top having the most copies sold in 2008. The first episode of Rookies was rated a 9.5 when it re-ran on December 31, 2008. The Rookies Omote Box was ranked 30th on the Oricon charts with 1,891 copies sold between June 8–14, 2009, and the Rookies Ura Box set was ranked 24th on the Oricon charts with 1,997 copies sold between June 1–7, 2009.

The Rookies drama series was awarded five of the possible nine awards at the 58th Television Drama Academy Awards in 2008. Rookies was awarded best drama; Ryuta Sato was awarded best actor; Hayato Ichihara was awarded best supporting actor; "Kiseki" by Greeeen was awarded best theme song and Nikogaku Nine was awarded the special award. Rookies was highly commended as one of the best drama series at the 2008 Asian Television Awards.

Document of Rookies ~Sotsugyō debut at 15th on the Oricon charts between April 21–28, 2009 with 9,141 copies sold. It sold 3,092 copies during June 1–7, 2009 to be ranked tenth. It sold 2,648 copies the following week and dropped to rank 20.

Rookies: Graduation topped the Japanese box office chart when it premiered on May 30, 2009, earning the equivalent of US$12,703,775 over the May 30–31 weekend. It continued to top the Japanese box office chart the following weekend, earning US$12,703,775 that weekend. It was ranked second on the box office chart to Terminator Salvation, earning US$8,278,440 that weekend. It rose back to top the box office charts on the June 20–21 weekend, earning US$6,404,066 that weekend. On the fifth weekend, the movie dropped to second place behind Evangelion: 2.0 You Can (Not) Advance, earning US$4,290,266 that weekend. On its sixth weekend on the box office charts, it stayed at second place, earning US$2,933,634 that weekend. In its seventh weekend, Rookies: Graduation fell to fourth place and earned US$1,894,007, and has grossed US$82 million as of July 15. In its eighth weekend, Rookies: Graduation, fell to 8th place and earned US$1,129,349. In its ninth weekend, Rookies: Graduation rose to sixth place and earned US$748,804.
