= 750 Rider =

Japanese manga series

- Cover of the first tankōbon volume, featuring Mitsu Hayakawa with his Honda Dream CB750 FOUR

750ライダー (Nanahan Raidā)
- Manga
- Written by: Isami Ishii
- Published by: Akita Shoten
- Imprint: Shōnen Champion Comics
- Magazine: Weekly Shōnen Champion
- Original run: 1975 – 1985
- Volumes: 50

750 Rider (Japanese: 750ライダー, Hepburn: Nanahan Raidā) is a Japanese shōnen manga series written and illustrated by Isami Ishii. It was published from 1975 to 1985 in the magazine Weekly Shōnen Champion, owned by Akita Shoten, with a total of 50 volumes.

This manga was preceded by another work of the same author named 750 Rock, which was published between 1973 and 1974 in the magazine Weekly Shōnen Sunday, owned by Shogakukan. In 2001, two live actions were released, named 750 Rider and 750 Rider 2, which would later be released on DVD.

== Synopsis ==
It depicts the interaction between Mitsu Hayakawa, a high school sophomore who loves riding his 750cc motorcycle Honda Dream CB750 FOUR, and his group of friends.

== Reception ==
By 2014, the manga had over 20 million copies in circulation.
