= Tetsu Kariya =

Japanese manga artist and essayist

Tetsu Kariya 雁屋 哲
- Born: Tetsuya Totsuka (戸塚 哲也); October 6, 1941 (age 85) Beijing, China
- Area: Manga artist
- Notable works: Oishinbo
- Awards: 32nd Shogakukan Manga Award Young Adult General Category (1987)

Tetsuya Totsuka (Japanese: 戸塚 哲也, Hepburn: Totsuka Tetsuya; born October 6, 1941), also known as Tetsu Kariya (雁屋 哲, Kariya Tetsu), Ageta Shinya, Ryu Setaki, and Kariya F., is a Japanese manga artist and essayist. He is best known for writing the manga series Oishinbo, one of the best-selling manga series in history. The series was a perennial best-seller, selling 1.2 million copies per volume, for a total of more than 135 million copies sold. It has also been adapted into anime, games, TV dramas, and films.

In March 2016, Kariya announced on his blog that he wanted to end the manga after it returned from hiatus. He wrote that "30 years is too long for many things" and that he believed "it's about time to end it.

== Early life ==
Born on October 6, 1941 (30th year of the Republic of China) in Beijing, Republic of China. After the war, he returned to Japan and grew up in Denenchofu, Tokyo. He was in and out of hospitals during his elementary and middle school years due to tuberculous infections, and had to see doctors frequently, so he wanted to become a doctor himself, but he was disgusted by the gloominess of the University of Tokyo Hospital building and changed his goal. After graduating from Tokyo Metropolitan Koyamadai High School, he majored in quantum mechanics at the Department of Basic Sciences, College of Arts and Sciences, University of Tokyo.

When he entered university, he wanted to be a scholar, but in the summer of his fourth year, he decided that "rather than staying at university, I wanted to learn about the realities of human society in a more realistic way" and after graduating, he joined the advertising agency Dentsu, where he worked as a company employee for three years and nine months. However, he was unable to adapt to the corporate structure, and while still employed there, he began working as a manga author. After leaving the company in 1974, he began working full-time as a freelancer. In the early days, he mainly wrote manga for men's magazines and boys' magazines, and some of his works were adapted for television and movies.

In 1983, he began serializing the gourmet manga Oishinbo, illustrated by Akira Hanasaki. In 1988, he moved to Sydney, Australia. He has also published essays about Japanese food. In the late 1990s, he published the manga Shoot the Bat! and manga The Japanese and the Emperor, illustrated by Sugar Sato, in the opinion magazine Weekly Friday.

== Style ==
=== Debut - Dramatic works ===
In 1972, under the name Ageta Shinya, he began serializing his works in Kodansha's Weekly Shonen Magazine together with Ikegami Ryoichi. His first work was "Hitoribocchi no Rin," which depicts the athletic spirit of the protagonist, an orphan who excels in bicycle racing. Since then, he has produced many masculine and anti-authority gekiga works, many of which depict young men with strong bodies and minds confronting the corrupt powers that trample on people. His works serialized in boys' magazines include "Otokogumi" and "Otoko Ozora."

A representative work serialized in a young men's magazine during this period, "The Kingdom of Ambition," was a complete departure from the Otokogumi, with a picaresque theme centered on violence and murder committed by villains seeking power, and it continues to enjoy cult popularity today. In the afterword to the "complete edition" published by Nippon Bungeisha, Kariya states, "In The Kingdom of Ambition, I intended to portray, without sugarcoating it, that violence is at the root of what drives human society."

=== Tipping point ===
The turning point for Karaya was "Dan, the Warrior of the Wind." Traditionally, Kariya did not like its illustrators to include elements that were not in the original work, but in this work, illustrator Kazuhiko Shimamoto included a gag that was not in the original work. However, Kariya agreed to it, finding it funny, and even began to include gags when writing the original work. This marked a turning point for Kariya, who had been exclusively focused on violent manga, and foreshadowed the success of "Oishinbo". Shimamoto wrote a line expressing his own dissatisfaction with a main character who suffers in the work, saying, "Even works by the same author can be so different! In Oishinbo, they eat delicious food and then complain. And yet they eat even more delicious food! And yet!!" as a joke, highlighting the difference between this work and Oishinbo, which had become a social phenomenon at the time.

=== Oishinbo ===
In 1983, he began serializing "Oishinbo" in Shogakukan's Big Comic Spirits magazine in collaboration with young manga artist Akira Hanasaki. In the story, he drew the "Ultimate Menu" published by Tozai Shimbun, and the word "Ultimate" won the Gold Prize in the New Words and Buzzwords Awards in 1986. The series has continued to this day, with total sales of the book exceeding 100 million copies. In 1987, it won the Young Adults General Category of the 32nd Shogakukan Manga Award. It has also been adapted into anime, games, TV dramas, and movies.

"Oishinbo" is a commercially successful manga with the longest serialization period and the highest sales of any of Kariya's works. However, since the 1990s, he has not published any new works for boys' or young men's magazines, and has hardly been active as an author of violent manga in the past, such as "Oakland". Therefore, since the serialization of "Oishinbo", this work is considered to be Kariya's masterpiece. When Kariya later started a blog, he titled it "Oishinbo Diary" and acknowledged it himself. Kariya wrote the original story to criticize the gourmet boom, but with the birth of this work, it has come to be called a gourmet manga rather than a cooking manga. He also shows dislike for being treated as a gourmet writer or a foodie, and in his work he often criticizes the pretense and snobbishness of "foodies" and the "gourmet boom".

In addition to gourmet food, Oishinbo also covers many topics related to food safety and ethics, and is therefore sometimes praised for having made an impact on postwar food culture. However, the story also sometimes criticizes real manufacturers and specific products (Ajinomoto, Asahi Beer, Suntory, etc.). There are also several cases in which food-related knowledge is published with incorrect understanding, which has led to criticism.

He often deals with food culture and political themes related to food, and in the 13th volume, "Fierce Whale Battle," he introduced whaling and the Japanese culture surrounding it, arguing that "whaling is a culture." In 2009, in his blog, "Oishinbo Diary," he criticized the anti-whaling group Sea Shepherd, which engages in whaling obstruction activities, as being more than just pirates, but "terrorists," and stated that it was only natural to send in Self-Defense Force vessels, calling for the capture of Sea Shepherd and the arrest and detention of its crew. At the same time, he criticized the Australian government for condoning their activities. Regarding Australia, in the 33rd volume, "The Enchanting Continent (Part 2)", he is inspired by the country and says that "Australian multiculturalism is the most advanced in the world" and that he even decided to move there himself. However, in the 65th volume, "Australia in Crisis (Part 2)", he takes up the issue of the rise of discrimination in Australia and has a character say that "it's a country you shouldn't go to right now", harshly criticizing the country as dangerous even for tourists, changing his previous opinion.

== List of works ==
=== Comics ===
- Kaze no Bancho (art: Sachio Umemoto, circa 1974, Monthly Shonen Magazine)
- Otoko-gumi (art: Ryoichi Ikegami, 1974–1979, Weekly Shonen Sunday)
- Ginga Senshi Apolon (art: Ryu Kaido, 1975, Shonen King) – A science fiction manga about a space war, which later became the original concept for the anime UFO Senshi Daiapolon, but it does not feature giant robots. Not collected in tankōbon.
- Kaisho-Oh (art: Eiji Kazama, 1975–1976, Weekly Shonen Magazine)
- Kaibutsu Kyudan (art: Shuichi Seino, 1976–1977, Comic Magazine)
- Yabo no Okoku (art: Kenji Yuki, 1977–1982, Weekly Manga Goraku)
- Kuro no Key (art: Seisaku Kano, 1977, Big Comic Original) – A rather radical work where the mastermind behind the protagonist's opposing organization is a very prominent figure.
- Tsukiya (art: Hosei Hasegawa, 1977, Weekly Shonen Sunday) – Serialized during Otoko-gumi's hiatus.
- Jinro Sensen (art: Yosuke Tamaru, 1978, Manga Donki)
- Honoo no Chojin Megaloman (art: Shigeru Akimoto, 1979, Terebi-kun) – A comic adaptation of the TV tokusatsu series of the same title, but the original story for the serialization was newly written. This was clearly stated in the column headers of the pages.
- Otoko Ozora (art: Ryoichi Ikegami, 1980–1982, Weekly Shonen Sunday)
- Otoko wa Tenpei (art: Tokihiko Inoue, 1981–1983, Weekly Young Jump)
- Kaze no Senshi Dan (art: Kazuhiko Shimamoto, 1982–1986, Weekly Shonen Sunday Zokan)
- Shishi-tachi no Koya (art: Kenji Yuki, 1983–1984, Weekly Manga Goraku)
- Oishinbo (art: Akira Hanasaki, 1983–, Big Comic Spirits) – Received the 32nd Shogakukan Manga Award (1986).
- Star Steps (art: Minoru Ito, 1983–1986, Monthly ComiComi)
- ZINGY (art: Atsushi Kamijo, 1984, Weekly Shonen Sunday)
- Don (art: Kazuhiro Iga, 1985, Nihon Bungeisha Goraku C)
- The Terror (art: Morimi Murano, 1986–1988, Weekly Sankei)
- Komori o Ute! (art: Sugar Sato, 1997–1998, Weekly Kinyobi) – A work in the vein of Kariya's Gomanism Sengen, positioned as the antithesis of Gomanism Sengen. It concluded with the start of the Manga Nihonjin to Tenno serialization.
- Manga Nihonjin to Tenno (art: Sugar Sato, 1998–2000, Weekly Kinyobi)
- Manga Masaka no Fukuzawa Yukichi (art: Sugar Sato, 2016, Yugensha) – Two volumes, newly drawn tankōbon

Under the name Shinya Ageta

- Hitoribocchi no Rin (art: Ryoichi Ikegami, 1972, Weekly Shonen Magazine) – Debut work. Co-original story. A passionate sports manga depicting the process of an orphaned protagonist becoming a keirin racer after tremendous effort.

Under the name Ryu Setaki

- Nihiki no Bull (art: Takashi Iwasuke, 1986–1988, Big Comic Spirits) – A different pen name was used as it was serialized concurrently with Oishinbo.

=== Novels ===
- Nisen Nanahyaku-nen no Bimi (Kadokawa Shoten, September 1993). Kyukyoku no Bimi (Kadokawa Shoten &lt;Kadokawa Horror Bunko>, December 1995). ISBN 978-4041783047

=== Anime/Tokusatsu ===
- UFO Senshi Daiapolon (Eiken, 1976) - Robot anime. Ginga Senshi Apolon was the original concept, and some of the settings were carried over, but the author was not involved in the production.
- Megaloman (Toho, 1979) – Tokusatsu hero show. As the original author, he was involved from the planning stages and also wrote the lyrics for the theme song.

Essays

- Oishinbo no Shokutaku (Kadokawa Shoten, July 1987). ISBN 4-04-883217-4. Oishinbo no Shokutaku (Kadokawa Shoten &lt;Kadokawa Bunko>, September 1990). ISBN 4-04-178301-1.
- Oishinbo Shugi (Kadokawa Shoten, March 1989). ISBN 4-04-883232-8. Oishinbo Shugi (Kadokawa Shoten &lt;Kadokawa Bunko>, May 1992). ISBN 4-04-178303-8.
- Kariya Tetsu no Oishinbo Retto (NHK Publishing, June 1989). ISBN 4-14-008651-3.
- Nihonjin no Hokori "Kane o Oshimuna, Na o Oshime" no Shiso (Asukashinsha, August 1995). ISBN 4-87031-227-1.
- Oishinbo Juku "Oishinbo" o Motto Oishiku Suru Tokubetsu Kogi (Shogakukan &lt;My First Big Books>, April 20, 2001). ISBN 4-09-359381-7.
- Oishinbo Juku 2 Shoku o Aisuru Subete no Hito ni Okuru Tsukai Kogi (Shogakukan &lt;My First Big Books>, June 15, 2006). ISBN 4-09-359382-5.
- Sydney Kosodate Ki Steiner Kyoiku to no Deai (Yugensha, November 2008). ISBN 978-4-9903019-3-4.
- Zutsu, Kata Kori, Kokoro no Kori ni Oishinbo (Yugensha, June 2010). ISBN 978-4-9903019-5-8.
- Oishinbo "Hanaji Mondai" ni Kotaeru (Yugensha, January 2015). ISBN 978-4-9903019-8-9.
- Rosanjin to Oishinbo (Shogakukan, December 2016). ISBN 978-4-0918770-6-2
