= Isami Ishii =

Japanese manga artist (1941–2022)

- Born: 8 December 1941; Ōta, Tokyo, Japan
- Died: 17 September 2022 (aged 80)
- Education: Tokyo Metropolitan Kuramae Technical High School
- Occupation: Manga artist

Isami Ishii (Japanese: 石井いさみ Ishii Isami; 8 December 1941 – 17 September 2022) was a Japanese manga artist. He was mainly known for writing the manga 750 Rider and Kutabare!! Namida-kun.

== Works ==
- Nora Inu no Oka
- Kutabare!! Namida-kun (1970)
- Aoi Tori no Densetsu (1972)
- Banchou Ace (1972)
- Goromaki Ken (1973)
- Koukou Akumyouden (1974)
- 750 Rider (1975)
- Zakuro no Hana (1976)
- Shikakui Aozora (1978)
- Kenka no Seisho (1979)
- Ashita ni Makatte Nagero! (1980)
- Ryuu ga Kiru! (1980)
- Kaze to Ore-tachi (1980)
- Tsume Ato (1984)
- Hashire!! Mio (1984)
- Tic Tak (1985)
- 750 Rock (1986)
- Neppuu Sensei (1988)
