= Oishinbo =

Manga and anime series

- 102nd tankōbon volume cover, featuring Shirō Yamaoka (top right), Yūzan Kaibara (top left), and Yūko Kurita (center bottom)

美味しんぼ
- Genre: Cooking; Comedy
- Manga
- Written by: Tetsu Kariya
- Illustrated by: Akira Hanasaki
- Published by: Shogakukan
- English publisher: NA: Viz Media
- Magazine: Big Comic Spirits
- Original run: October 1983 – May 12, 2014 (indefinite hiatus)
- Volumes: 111
- Anime television series
- Directed by: Yoshio Takeuchi
- Produced by: Hidehiko Takei (NTV); Yoshio Katō
- Music by: Kazuo Otani
- Studio: Shin-Ei Animation
- Original network: NNS (NTV)
- Original run: October 17, 1988 – March 17, 1992
- Episodes: 136
- Anime television film

Oishinbo: Kyūkyoku Tai Shikō, Chōju Ryōri Taiketsu!!
- Directed by: Iku Suzuki
- Written by: Haruya Yamazaki
- Music by: Kazuo Otani
- Studio: Shin-Ei Animation
- Original network: NNS (NTV)
- Released: December 11, 1992
- Runtime: 90 minutes
- Anime television film

Oishinbo: Nichibei Kome Sensō
- Directed by: Iku Suzuki
- Written by: Haruya Yamazaki
- Music by: Kazuo Otani
- Studio: Shin-Ei Animation
- Original network: NNS (NTV)
- Released: December 3, 1993
- Runtime: 89 minutes
- Live-action film
- Directed by: Azuma Morisaki
- Produced by: Shigehiro Nakagawa; Renji Tazawa; Junichirō Hisaita; Katsuhiko Takemasa; Osamu Kamei; Hisaomi Saitō
- Written by: Toshiharu Maruuchi; Masao Kajiura
- Music by: Takayuki Inoue
- Studio: Shochiku
- Released: April 13, 1996
- Runtime: 105 minutes
- Anime television series

Shin Oishinbo
- Directed by: Kenichi Nishida
- Written by: Takahiro Nagano
- Studio: SynergySP; Vega Entertainment
- Original network: TV Tokyo, BS Asahi
- Original run: January 5, 2027 – scheduled
- icon

Oishinbo (Japanese: 美味しんぼ; lit. "The Gourmet") is a long-running Japanese cooking manga series written by Tetsu Kariya and drawn by Akira Hanasaki. The manga's title is a portmanteau of the Japanese word for "delicious", oishii (美味しい), and the word for someone who loves to eat, kuishinbō (食いしん坊). The series depicts the adventures of culinary journalist Shirō Yamaoka and his partner (and later wife), Yūko Kurita. It was published by Shogakukan between 1983 and 2008 in Big Comic Spirits, and resumed again on February 23, 2009, only to be put on an indefinite hiatus after the May 12, 2014, edition in the weekly Big Comic Spirits, following harsh criticism of Oishinbo's treatment of the Fukushima Daiichi disaster.

Before this suspension, Oishinbo was collected in 111 tankōbon volumes, making it the 18th longest manga released and among the best-selling manga series in history. The series was a perennial best-seller, selling 1.2 million copies per volume, for a total of more than 135 million copies sold.

The series received the 1986 Shogakukan Manga Award for seinen/general manga. It was adapted as a 136-episode anime television series by Shin-Ei Animation that was broadcast on Nippon Television from October 1988 to March 1992, followed by two sequel anime television film specials in 1992 and 1993. A new anime television series adaptation titled Shin Oishinbo is set to premiere in January 2027.

It was adapted into a live-action film directed by Azuma Morisaki, starring Kōichi Satō and Rentarō Mikuni, which premiered on April 13, 1996. The manga is licensed in English in North America by Viz Media.

In March 2016, writer Tetsu Kariya announced on his blog that he wanted to end the manga after it returned from hiatus. He wrote that "30 years is too long for many things" and that he believed "it's about time to end it."

== Plot ==
Oishinbo is a drama featuring journalist Shirō Yamaoka who works for the Tōzai Shimbun. He is a cynical food critic who is tasked by the newspaper's owner, along with the young Yūko Kurita, to provide recipes for the "ultimate menu". During their search, they encounter Yamaoka's fastidious and demanding father, Yūzan Kaibara, a famous gourmand who tries to sabotage Yamaoka's project.

== Characters ==
The character names listed here are in western order of family name last. The official English language manga volumes use the Japanese naming order of family name first.

Shirō Yamaoka (山岡 士郎, Yamaoka Shirō)
Voiced by: Kazuhiko Inoue (1988 series), Yōhei Azakami (2027 series)
Portrayed by: Toshiaki Karasawa (1994 show), Masahiro Matsuoka (2007 show)
Shirō Yamaoka a 27-year-old journalist for the Tōzai News (東西新聞社, Tōzai Shinbun)'s culture division and the head of its Ultimate Menu project. He is the only son of the world-famous potter and gourmand Yūzan Kaibara. He was forced to cook in his father's Gourmet Club when he was still at school and he resents his father, blaming him for his mother's early death. He once destroyed his father's paintings and ceramics because he believed his father cared more about food and his reputation than his family. Yamaoka appears lazy and uninterested unless it concerns food where he possesses a deep knowledge.
Yūko Kurita (栗田 ゆう子, Kurita Yūko)
Voiced by: Mayumi Shō (1988 series), Hitomi Sasaki (2027 series)
Portrayed by: Yuriko Ishida (1-3), Yasuko Tomita (4-5) (1995 show), Yuka (2007 show)
Kurita is Yamaoka's co-worker and assists him in the Ultimate Menu project. She is often seen with Noriko Hanamura and Kinue Tabata, and together they are referred to as the "Culture Department Flower Trio". Kurita later marries Shirō Yamaoka and they have two children together, Yōji (陽士) and Yumi (遊美).
Yūzan Kaibara (海原 雄山, Kaibara Yūzan)
Voiced by: Chikao Ōtsuka (1988 series), Akio Otsuka (2027 series)
Portrayed by: Yoshio Harada (1), Tōru Emori (2-5) (1994 show); Ken Matsudaira (2007 show)
Kaibara is Yamaoka's father and rival. Kaibara trained Yamaoka, but the two had a falling-out. The relationship worsens when Kaibara begins to work for the Supreme Menu project of the Teito Times (帝都新聞, Teito Shinbun), a rival newspaper. Kaibara is the founder and director of the Gourmet Club. He is also an artist and the author of the Dictionary of Poetic References. He is modelled after Kitaoji Rosanjin.
Daizō Ōhara (大原 大蔵, Ōhara Daizō)
Voiced by: Osamu Saka (1988 series), Nobuo Tobita (2027 series)
Ōhara is the publisher of the Tōzai News and initiates the Ultimate Menu project.
Kyōichi Koizumi (小泉 鏡一, Koizumi Kyōichi)
Voiced by: Seizō Katō (1988 series), Hiroshi Naka (2027 series)
Editor-in-chief of the Tōzai News.
Hideo Tanimura (谷村 秀夫, Tanimura Hideo)
Voiced by: Shunsuke Shima (1988 series), Tōru Furusawa (2027 series)
Tanimura is the director of the arts and culture department of the Tōzai News.
Tomio Tomii (富井 富雄, Tomii Tomio)
Voiced by: Osamu Katō (1988 series), Kōsuke Echigoya (2027 series)
Tomii is the deputy director of the arts and culture department. He is known for his buck teeth and baldness. His son's name is Hitoshi, who's known for his glasses, bowlcut hair and freckles and he studies in Class 5-B alongside classmate Masashi, who is the victim of this class' bullying.
Tōjin Tōyama (唐山 陶人, Tōyama Tōjin)
Voiced by: Kōsei Tomita (1988 series), Ken Uo (2027 series)
Tōyama is a famous ceramicist and gourmet and is married to the much younger woman, Ryoko.
Seiichi Okaboshi (岡星 精一, Okaboshi Seiichi)
Voiced by: Norio Wakamoto (1988 series), Tomokazu Seki (2027 series)
Okaboshi is a talented young chef and the owner of Yamaoka's preferred place to socialize.
Fuyumi Okaboshi (岡星 冬美, Okaboshi Fuyumi)
Voiced by: Yōko Asagami
Fuyumi becomes Okaboshi's wife and runs the restaurant with him.
Ryōzō Okaboshi (岡星 良三, Okaboshi Ryōzō)
Voiced by: Toshihiko Seki
Seiichi's younger brother who works as a chef in Kaibara's Gourmet Club.
Mantarō Kyōgoku (京極 万太郎, Kyōgoku Mantarō)
Voiced by: Takeshi Watabe (1988 series), Kenji Yamauchi (2027 series)
A wealthy businessman and a gourmet who lives in Osaka.
Noriko Hanamura (花村 典子, Hanamura Noriko)
Voiced by: Rei Sakuma (1988 series), Hiroko Ushida (2027 series)
She is a friend of Yūko Kurita and one of the "Culture Department Flower Trio".
Kinue Tabata (田畑 絹江, Tabata Kinue)
Voiced by: Rin Mizuhara (1988 series), Kyō Yaoya (2027 series)
She is a friend of Yūko Kurita and one of the "Culture Department Flower Trio".
Inspector Nakamatsu (中松警部, Nakamatsu-keibu)
Voiced by: Norio Fukutome
A Police Inspector with a gruff exterior, but he is quite soft-hearted and forms a friendship with Yamaoka.
Tatsu-san (辰さん)
Voiced by: Reizō Nomoto
A homeless man who collects leftovers from various restaurants in Ginza, so he knows which ones have the highest quality food. He introduced Yamaoka to Okaboshi's restaurant. His full name is Tatsunojō Hanamikōji (花見小路 辰之丈, Hanamikōji Tatsunojō).
Tokuo Nakagawa (中川 得夫, Nakagawa Tokuo)
Voiced by: Ryūji Nakagi
He is the head chef of the Gourmet Club.
Kairakutei Black (快楽亭ブラック, Kairakutei Burakku)
Voiced by: Takeshi Aono
An American food writer and researcher who gets acquainted with Yamaoka and Kurita when he is in Japan studying tofu dishes. He later becomes a rakugo artist and takes the name Kairakutei. His original name is Henry James Black but he also uses the pen name Stan Black.
Terue Yumemi (夢見テルエ, Yumemi Terue)
Voiced by: Minami Takayama
One half of a manzai comedy duo. She marries Kairakutei Black and they have a daughter together.
Mariko Niki (Note: In the Viz Media translation her family name is transcribed as Futaki.) (二木 まり子, Niki Mariko)
Voiced by: Saeko Shimazu
Mariko Niki is a co-worker of Yamaoka and Kurita who writes for Touzai Graph a weekly pictorial magazine. Her family is very wealthy. Her father is Takashi Niki, the president of one of Japan's biggest banks. She studied at a university in Paris and transferred back to Japan from the Touzai Paris office. To the dismay of Yūko Kurita, she pursues Yamaoka romantically but he is not interested in marrying her. Later, she marries a freelance photographer named Kinjō (近城).
Teruko (輝子)
Voiced by: Rihoko Yoshida
Teruko is Mariko's aunt. Mariko believes her difficult personality is the reason she's still unmarried. However, eventually she marries a novelist called Katamori.
Chairman Niki (二木会長, Niki-kaichō)
Voiced by: Hisashi Katsuta
Mariko's grandfather and chairman of the Nito Financial Group. He believes he should have a say in who Mariko chooses as a husband.
Arthur Brown (アーサー・ブラウン, Āsā Buraun)
Voiced by: Akira Murayama
A friend of Kairakutei Black and an editor for an American magazine. He often asks Yamaoka and his colleagues for help when he writes articles about Japan. His Japanese is strange as he uses archaic words and odd expressions.
Ichiro Dan (団一郎, Dan Ichirō)
Voiced by: Daisuke Ono
Isamu Kinjo (金城勇, Kinjō Isamu)
Voiced by: Yasuaki Takumi
Mariko Niki (仁木真理子, Niki Mariko)
Voiced by: Akane Fujita

== Media ==
=== Manga ===
==== Volumes ====
No.	Release date	ISBN
01	November 30, 1984	4-09-180751-8
001. "Tofu and water" (豆腐と水, "tōfu to Mizu"); 002. "A Battle of Flavors!!" (味で勝負（アンコウの肝）, "aji de Shōbu (ankō no kimo)"); 003. "The Heart for Sushi" (寿司の心（にぎり寿司）, "Sushi no Kokoro (nigirizushi)"); 004. "The Exceptional in The Unexpectional" (平凡の非凡（ご飯、ミソ汁、イワシの丸干し）, "Heibon no Hibon (Gohan, Misoshiru, Iwashi no Maruboshi)"); 005. "The Pride of a Chef" (料理人のプライド（バター）, "Ryōrinin no Puraido (Batā)"); 006. "The Sound of Oil" (油の音（天プラ）, "Abura no Oto (Tempura)"); 007. "The Secret to Dashi" (ダシの秘密（カツオブシ、昆布）, "Dashi no Himitsu (Katsuobushi, Kombu)"); 008. "The Freshness of Vegetables" (野菜の鮮度（ダイコン）, "Yasai no Sendo (Daikon)"); 009. "The Taste in Her Memories" (舌の記憶（水たき）, "Shita no Kioku (Mizutaki)")
02	March 30, 1985	4-09-180752-6
001. "The Value of Patience" (手間の価値, "Tema no kachi"); 002. "A fish That's Alive" (活きた魚, "Ikita sakana"); 003. "The Depth of Soba Tsuyu" (そばツユの深味, "Soba Tsuyu no Fukami"); 004. "The Ingredients of Japan" (日本の素材, "Nihon no sozai"); 005. "The Fundamentals of Knifework" (包丁の基本, "Hōchō no kihon"); 006. "The Memories in The Menu" (思い出のメニュー, "Omoide no menyū"); 007. "The Fish of Legend" (幻の魚, "Maboroshi no sakana"); 008. "Life with Chuka Soba" (中華そばの命, "Chūka soba no inochi")
03	May 30, 1985	4-09-180753-4
001. "The Magic of Charcoal" (炭火の魔力, "Sumibi no maryoku"); 002. "The Originality in Wagashi" (和菓子の創意, "Wagashi no sōi"); 003. "The Power of Claypots" (土鍋のカ, "Donabe no ka"); 004. "The Rules of Cuisine" (料理のルール, "Ryōri no rūru"); 005. "The Miracle of Soy Sauce" (醤油の神秘, "Shōyu no shinpi"); 006. "The Subtleties of Public Relations" (接待の妙, "Settai no myō"); 007. "The Source of Her Singing Voice" (美声の源, "Bisei no minamoto"); 008. "The Succulence of Beef" (肉の旨味, "Niku no umami"); 009. "The Consequence of Having Lunch" (昼メシの効果, "Hiru meshi no kōka")
04	October 30, 1985	4-09-180754-2
001. "The Power of Direct Flame" (直火の威力, "Chokubi no iryoku"); 002. "The Elegance of Women" (女の華, "On'na no hana"); 003. "The Ingenuity for Travel" (旅先の知恵, "Tabisaki no chie"); 004. "The Qualities of Liquors" (酒の効用, "Sake no kōyō")
05	April 30, 1986	4-09-180755-0
001. "Miso no shikomi" (味噌の仕込み); 002. "Aodake no kaori" (青竹の香り); 003. "Gikō no kyokuchi" (技巧の極致); 004. "Supaisu no himitsu" (スパイスの秘密); 005. "Kusa-sa no miryoku" (臭さの魅力); 006. "Gyūnabe no aji" (牛なべの味); 007. "Sarada to biyō" (サラダと美容); 008. "Motenashi no kokoro" (もてなしの心); 009. "Sendo to supīdo" (鮮度とスピード)
06	July 30, 1986	4-09-180756-9
001. "Edokko zōni" (江戸ッ子雑煮); 002. "Tamago to furaipan" (卵とフライパン); 003. "Haru no ibuki" (春のいぶき); 004. "Mafuyu no chinmi" (真冬の珍味); 005. "Karami no chōwa" (辛味の調和); 006. "Nihon no konsome" (日本のコンソメ); 007. "Gyūniku no chikara" (牛肉の力); 008. "Kyūkyoku no sahō" (究極の作法)
07	October 30, 1986	4-09-180757-7
001. "Daichi no aka" (大地の赤); 002. "Hyōka to koi" (氷菓と恋); 003. "Chajin to ichigo" (茶人といちご); 004. "Tesaki no bi" (手先の美)
08	December 17, 1986	4-09-180758-5
09	March 30, 1987	4-09-180759-3
10	May 30, 1987	4-09-180760-7
11	July 30, 1987	4-09-181401-8
12	September 30, 1987	4-09-181402-6
13	December 17, 1987	4-09-181403-4
14	March 30, 1988	4-09-181404-2
15	May 30, 1988	4-09-181405-0

=== Anime ===
==== 1988 television series ====
The manga was adapted into an anime television series produced by Shin-Ei Animation that ran on Nippon Television from October 17, 1988, to March 17, 1992, for 136 episodes. The series was followed by two television specials: Oishinbo: Ultimate VS Supreme (美味しんぼ 究極対至高 長寿料理対決!!, Oishinbo: Kyūkyoku Tai Shikō, Chōju Ryōri Taiketsu!!) aired in December 1992, and Oishinbo: Japan-US Rice War (美味しんぼ 日米コメ戦争, Oishinbo: Nichibei Kome Sensō) aired a year later in December 1993.

==== 2027 television series ====
A new anime television series adaptation titled Shin Oishinbo (新 美味しんぼ) was announced by Shin-Ei Animation during the Abema Anime Matsuri 2026 livestream event on September 19, 2026, commemorating its 50th anniversary. The series will be produced by SynergySP and Vega Entertainment and directed by Kenichi Nishida, with Takahiro Nagano handling series composition and Nozomi Kawashige designing the characters. It is set to premiere on January 5, 2027, on TV Tokyo and BS Asahi. The opening theme song is "PROMISE ME", performed by Yui Makino, and the ending theme song is "Akashi" (明石, Proof), performed by Skoop on Somebody.

=== Video games ===
- Oishinbo: Kyukyoku no Menu 3bon Syoubu (Family Computer, 1989, developed by TOSE)
- Oishinbo: DS Recipe Shuu (Nintendo DS, 2007, published by Namco Bandai Games)

== North American release ==
The manga is licensed in English in North America by Viz Media, which published the first volume in January 2009. Seven volumes from the Oishinbo à la Carte (美味しんぼア・ラ・カルト, Oishinbo A Ra Karuto) series were published from January 2009 to January 2010. These editions are thematic compilations (and include stories from across the timeline), making the English editions effectively a best of the "best of." These volumes are:

- Oishinbo: Japanese Cuisine, Vol. 1 (January 20, 2009; à la Carte volume 20) ISBN 1-4215-2139-3
- Oishinbo: Sake, Vol. 2 (March 17, 2009; à la Carte volume 26) ISBN 1-4215-2140-7
- Oishinbo: Ramen & Gyoza, Vol. 3 (May 19, 2009; à la Carte volume 2) ISBN 1-4215-2141-5
- Oishinbo: Fish, Sushi & Sashimi, Vol. 4 (July 21, 2009; à la Carte volume 5) ISBN 1-4215-2142-3
- Oishinbo: Vegetables, Vol. 5 (September 15, 2009; à la Carte volume 19) ISBN 1-4215-2143-1
- Oishinbo: The Joy of Rice, Vol. 6 (November 17, 2009; à la Carte volume 13) ISBN 1-4215-2144-X
- Oishinbo: Izakaya: Pub Food, Vol. 7 (January 19, 2010; à la Carte volume 12) ISBN 1-4215-2145-8

== Reception ==
In the 1980s, Japan had an upsurge in popularity in the gurume movement, called the "gourmet boom." Iorie Brau, author of Oishinbo's Adventures in Eating: Food, Communication, and Culture in Japanese Comics, said that this was the largest factor of the increase in popularity of gurume comics. The series's first volume sold around one million copies. The popularity of Oishinbo the comic lead to the development of the anime, the live action film, and many fansites. The fan-sites chronicle recipes that appeared in the manga.

Tetsu Kariya, the writer of Oishinbo, said in a 1986 interview that he was not a food connoisseur, and that he felt embarrassed whenever food experts read the comic.

== Controversy regarding Fukushima episodes ==
In April 2014, Oishinbo featured a story about the Fukushima nuclear accident called "The Truth of Fukushima". In this story, characters who visited the nuclear plant suffer nosebleeds that don't stop, and they conclude that the government should help people move away from the area because of the radiation. This prompted an intense backlash, both from local governments in Fukushima and across Japan; even Shinzo Abe weighed in, calling the claims "baseless rumors". The publisher had included statements along with the story from the Fukushima prefectural government and radiation expert Ikuro Anzai, objecting to the story for misleading people and noting that discrimination against Fukushima residents and products was doing far more harm than any radiation in the area. Despite these statements, Kariya stood by the story in the midst of the controversy, saying he had researched Fukushima for two years and could "only write the truth", but noted that he was not expecting such a strong reaction from the public. The following month, Shogakukan Inc. put Oishinbo on hiatus, its last appearance being the May 12, 2014, edition in the weekly Big Comic Spirits. Although the halt of publication coincided with the controversy, the editorial staff stated they had scheduled the hiatus beforehand.
