= Takao Yaguchi =

Japanese manga artist (1939–2020)

- Born: Takao Takahashi (髙橋 髙雄); 28 October 1939; Nishinaruse-mura, Ogachi District, Akita Prefecture, Empire of Japan
- Died: 20 November 2020 (aged 81)
- Occupation: Manga Artist
- Notable work: Fisherman Sanpei; Matagi

Takao Yaguchi (矢口高雄, Yaguchi Takao; 28 October 1939 – 20 November 2020), real name Takao Takahashi (髙橋 髙雄, Takahashi Takao), was a Japanese manga artist. He specialized in manga with ecological messages. His most famous manga was Fisherman Sanpei, which won the Kodansha Children's Manga Award in 1974.

== Biography ==
Takao Yaguchi was born Takao Takahashi (髙橋 髙雄, Takahashi Takao) on 28 October 1939 in Nishinaruse-mura, Ogachi District, Akita Prefecture in the Empire of Japan. He served as director on the board of directors for the Japan Cartoonists Association, and was an honorary director of the Masuda Manga Art Museum in Yokote.

He died on 20 November 2020 after being admitted to the hospital for treatment of pancreatic cancer.

== Bibliography ==
- Man's Path (おとこ道, Otoko Michi) (1970-1971, Weekly Shonen Sunday)
- Matagi Side Story (マタギ列伝, Matagi Gaiden) (1972-1974, Top Comic (Akita Shoten))
- Fishing Nuts (釣りバカたち, Tsuri Baka-tachi) (1972-1983, Weekly Manga Action)
- The Mysterious Wonder Snake Bachihebi (幻の怪蛇バチヘビ, Maboroshi no Kaija Bachihebi) (1973, Weekly Shonen Magazine)
- Oraga Village (おらが村, Oraga-mura) (1973-1975, 3 volumes, Weekly Manga Action)
- Fisherman Sanpei (1973-1983, 65 volumes, Weekly Shōnen Magazine)
- Matagi (マタギ) (1975-1976, 3 volumes, Manga Action)
- Toki (トキ) (1976, Kasakura Publishing)
- Katsumi (かつみ) (1977, 3 volumes, Weekly Shōnen Sunday)
- Japan Natural History (ニッポン博物誌, Nippon Hakubutsushi) (1978-1979, 3 volumes, Weekly Shōnen Sunday)
- Extreme Zodiac Investigative Report (劇的十二支考, Gekiteki Jūnishi Kō) (1983-1984, Comic Morning)
- Hometown (ふるさと, Furusato) (1983-1985, 11 volumes, Manga Action)
- Heeey!! Mountain Echo (オーイ!!やまびこ) (1988-1990, 7 volumes, Mainichi Chŭgakusei Shinbun)
- New Oraga Village (新・おらが村, Shin Oraga-mura) (1988-1992, 4 volumes, Chŭkō Comics Three)
- My Osamu Tezuka (ボクの手塚治虫, Boku no Tezuka Osamu) (1989, Mainichi Shinbun)
- Extreme Wave Magnitude 7.7 (激濤 Magnitude 7.7, Gekitō Magnichŭdo Nana-ten-Nana) (1989-1990, 3 volumes, Big Comic)
- Diligent Study Era (蛍雪時代, Keisetsu Jidai) (1993-1995, Shimbun Akahata, a somewhat autobiographical account of his junior high school years)
- Dropping Below 9!! Shōwa Banking Countryside Branch (9で割れ!!―昭和銀行田園支店, Kyuu de Ware!! Shōwa Ginkō Den'en Shiten) (1993-1995 and 2008–2009, Shōsetsu Chŭkō, a somewhat autobiographical account of his years as a banker)
- The Narrow Road to the Deep North (奥の細道, Oku no Hosomichi) (manga adaptation of the work by Bashō, volume 25 in the Manga Nihon no Koten (マンガ日本の古典) series, 1995, Chuokoron-Shinsha)
- Unpolished Folklore (野性伝説, Yasei Densetsu) (created by Yukio Togawa, 1995–1998, Monthly Big Gold). Contains the following short works:
  - "Tsume Ō" (爪王)
  - "Hifū" (羆風)
  - "Return North" (北へ帰る, Kita he Kaeru)
  - "Ameirokaku to Sanbon Yubi" (飴色角と三本指)
- Love Fish Sanpei Club (Love Fish三平クラブ, Rabu Fisshu Sanpei Kurabu) (1998-1999, Comic Alpha)
- Bass Boy Q (バスボーイQ, Basu Boi Kyū) (1999-2002, Crazy Bass)

== Awards and recognition ==
Year	Organization	Award title, Category	Work	Result	Refs
1974	Kodansha	Kodansha Culture Award, Childrens	Fisherman Sanpei	Won	
1976	Japan Cartoonists Association	Japan Cartoonists Association Award, Grand Prize	Matagi	Won	
2009	Minister of Education, Culture, Sports, Science and Technology	Person of Local Cultural Merit Award	-	Won	
