= Beshari-Gurashi =

Japanese manga series

- First tankōbon volume cover (Young Jump Comics edition)

べしゃり暮らし
- Genre: Comedy; Coming-of-age
- Manga
- Written by: Masanori Morita
- Published by: Shueisha
- Imprint: Jump Comics (2006; vol. 1–3); Young Jump Comics (2007–2019)
- Magazine: Weekly Shōnen Jump (2005–2006); Weekly Young Jump (2007–2015, 2019)
- Original run: October 3, 2005 – September 12, 2019
- Volumes: 20
- Television drama
- Directed by: Gekidan Hitori
- Written by: Tomihiko Tokunaga
- Music by: Yu Takami; Nobuaki Kanazawa
- Original network: TV Asahi
- Original run: July 27, 2019 – September 14, 2019
- Episodes: 8
- icon

Beshari-Gurashi (べしゃり暮らし; 'The Chatty Life') is a Japanese manga series written and illustrated by Masanori Morita. It was first serialized in Shueisha's shōnen manga magazine Weekly Shōnen Jump from October 2005 to June 2006, and later transferred to the publisher's seinen manga magazine Weekly Young Jump, where it ran from January 2007 to June 2015; a mini-story was published in the same magazine from July to September 2019. Its chapters were collected in 20 tankōbon volumes.

The series was adapted into an eight-episode television drama miniseries broadcast on TV Asahi from July to September 2019.

== Synopsis ==
Keisuke Agatsuma (上妻 圭右, Agatsuma Keisuke) is a high school student who aspires to a career in stand-up comedy, styling himself as his school's self-proclaimed "King of Comedy". His ambitions take a significant turn upon the arrival of Jun Nakanishi (中西 潤, Nakanishi Jun), a transfer student and former young comedian from Osaka. The two eventually form a comedic duo, navigating the challenges of the professional comedy industry while contending with personal conflicts, rivalries, and unresolved past experiences.

== Media ==
=== Manga ===
Written and illustrated by Masanori Morita, Beshari-Gurashi was first serialized for 28 chapters in Shueisha's shōnen manga magazine Weekly Shōnen Jump from October 3, 2005, to June 26, 2006. (Note: The series finished in the 30th issue of 2006 (cover date July 10), released on June 26.) Following a 29th chapter published in Akamaru Jump on August 16, 2006, the series was transferred to Shueisha's seinen manga magazine Weekly Young Jump on January 18, 2007, and finished on June 11, 2015; a mini-story was serialized in the same magazine from July 4 to September 12, 2019. Shueisha collected its chapters in twenty tankōbon volumes; the first three volumes were released under the Jump Comics imprint from February 3 to October 4, 2006; the volumes were later re-released and continued under the Young Jump Comics imprint from May 18, 2007, to September 19, 2019.

=== Drama ===
An eight-episode television drama adaptation was broadcast on TV Asahi from July 27 to September 14, 2019.

== Reception ==
Beshari-Gurashi was nominated for the 18th Tezuka Osamu Cultural Prize, for both the Grand Prize and Readers' Award, in 2014.
