= Masanori Morita =

Japanese manga artist

Morita Masanori 森田まさのり
- Born: December 22, 1966 (age 59) Ritto, Japan
- Area: Manga artist
- Notable works: Rokudenashi Blues, Rookies

Masanori Morita (Japanese: 森田まさのり, Hepburn: Morita Masanori; born December 22, 1966) is a Japanese manga artist known for his works Rokudenashi Blues and Rookies. He made his debut while still in high school and was an assistant of Tetsuo Hara on Fist of the North Star.

== Works ==
=== Serialized manga ===
- Rokudenashi Blues (ろくでなし BLUES, Rokudenashi Burūsu) (1988–1997); serialized in Shueisha's Weekly Shōnen Jump and collected in 42 tankōbon volumes
- Rookies (1998–2003); serialized in Shueisha's Weekly Shōnen Jump and collected in 24 tankōbon volumes
  - Rookies: Yume no Tsuzuki (ROOKIES 夢のつづき, Rūkīzu Yume no Tsuzuki) (2009); one-shot published in Shueisha's Weekly Young Jump
- Beshari-Gurashi (べしゃり暮らし) (2005–2015, 2019); serialized in Shueisha's Weekly Shōnen Jump (2005–2006) and Weekly Young Jump (2007–2015, 2019) and collected in 20 tankōbon volumes
- Zashisu (ザシス) (2022–2024); serialized in Shueisha's Grand Jump

=== Other ===
- Bachi – Atari Rock (1987); one-shot published in Shueisha's Weekly Shōnen Jump and collected in one volume with other one-shot stories in 1988 (reissued in 2010)
- Shiba Inu: Masanori Morita's Short Stories (柴犬 森田まさのり短編集, Shiba Inu Morita Masanori Tanpenshū) (2004); collection of one-shot stories published from 1991 to 2004 (reissued in 2010)
- Suberu o Itowazu: Masanori Morita's Short Stories (森田まさのり短編集 スベルヲイトワズ, Morita Masanori Tanpenshū Suberu o Itowazu) (2005; collection of one-shot stories)
- Hello Baby (2007); one-shot illustrated by Takeshi Obata and published in Shueisha's Jump Square
- Ato Ippon no Otoko (あと一本の男) (2014); one-shot illustrated Renjūrō Kindaichi and published in Shueisha's Weekly Young Jump
- Zetsubō no Petenshi-tachi (絶望のペテン師たち) (2016); one-shot illustrated by Hiroki Tomisawa and published in Shueisha's Miracle Jump
- Tobidase Byakudo! Jissen Jar Morita Masanori (とびだせビャクドー！ジッセンジャー) (2017); illustrated book published by Hongwanji Publishing
