= Hanagata =

Hanagata (written: 花形 lit. "floral pattern") is a Japanese surname. Notable people with the surname include:

- Keiko Hanagata (花形 恵子; 1935–2015), Japanese voice actress
- Rei Hanagata (花形 怜), Japanese manga artist
- Susumu Hanagata (花形 進; born 1947), Japanese boxer
