= List of Love Lab episodes =

- Cover of the seventh and final Blu-ray volume released by Aniplex in Japan on March 28, 2014.
- No. of episodes: 13

Release
- Original network: MBS
- Original release: July 4 – September 26, 2013

Love Lab is a 2013 comedy, slice of life Japanese anime series based on the manga by written and illustrated Ruri Miyahara. While delivering papers to the Student Council Room one day, Riko Kurahashi awkwardly walks in on the Student Council President and student exemplar, Natsuo Maki kissing a dakimakura. Riko then finds herself inadvertently recruited by Natsuo to be her aide in the student council, not only keep her secret, but to also help her practice romantic fantasies.

The anime is produced by Dogakobo and directed by Masahiko Ohta with series composition by Takashi Aoshima, character designs by Chiaki Nakajima, art direction by Shunsuke Suzuki and sound direction by Yasunori Ebina. The series premiered on MBS on July 4, 2013, with later airings on TBS, CBC, BS-TBS and AT-X along with online streaming on Niconico. The series was picked up by Crunchyroll for online simulcast streaming in North America and other select parts of the world, which began from the ninth episode. It was later obtained by the Anime Network for streaming. Aniplex released the series in Japan on seven Blu-ray and DVD volumes starting on September 20, 2013. The anime was licensed by Sentai Filmworks for distribution via select digital outlets and a home media release.

The opening theme is "Love Shitai—!" while the ending theme is "Best FriendS", both by Manami Numakura, Chinatsu Akasaki, Inori Minase, Ayane Sakura and Yō Taichi.

== Episode list ==
No.	Official English title (Note: All English titles are taken from Sentai Filmworks.) Original Japanese title	Directed by	Written by	Original release date (Note: As Love Lab premiered in MBS' Thursday 26:05 (02:05 JST) time slot, the episodes technically aired the days following the ones listed.)	Refs.
1	"Their Fateful Meeting"; Transliteration: "Deatte Shimatta Futari" (Japanese: 出会ってしまった二人)	Masahiro Ohta	Takashi Aoshima	July 4, 2013	
On their way to the prestigious Fujisaki Girls Academy, tomboy Riko Kurahashi saves two girls from a rogue football and are left marveling at her gruff wild exterior which is in contrast to the other girls at the academy. That day, Riko is reluctantly tasked with delivering papers to the Student Council Room, and finds that she desires excitement at the rather dull academy. When Riko arrives at the room, she shockingly discovers the student council president, Natsuo Maki kissing a dakimakura pillow. An embarrassed Natsuo begins panicking, but after a brief exchange of words, Riko promises to keep her secret and winds up in a strange situation where she has to simulate a scene involving meeting a guy for the first time with Natsuo. The next day, Riko shockingly finds herself recruited to the student council by Natsuo, as a cover to help her practice her relationship fantasies much to Riko's dismay. The next day, while pondering on all of the duties Natsuo is tasked with fulfilling, Riko feels as though she should offer aid with the workload. However Natsuo explains that her efficiency caused the previous Student council president to resign as well as explaining the strange traits of the two other members. Riko teasingly states that guys tend to avoid perfectly efficient girls, which prompts Natsuo to knowingly switch some important documents with her "Love Learning reports" and hence yielding her a severe scolding from Riko. Afterwards, Natsuo continues with her love lessons, but constantly finds herself pulled into unlikely romantic fantasies as frowned upon by Riko. The next day, while continuing their love lessons, a girl finds her way into the council room and timidly runs off before Riko can question her, while Natsuo is pulled into another one of her fantasies.
2	"The Cool, the Shy, and the Voyeur?"; Transliteration: "Hazukashigariya to Kūru to Hentai?" (Japanese: 恥ずかしがり屋とクールと変態？)	Takanori Yano	Hideaki Koyasu	July 11, 2013	
Suzune Tanahashi tries to hide when Natsuo and Riko begin a carefree exchange in the council room, destroying her image of Natsuo in the process and flees despite Riko attempting to stop her. Two days later Natsuo starts feeling hurt after thinking that Suzune disdains her due to her behavior, while Suzune herself starts regretting she ran away. Attempting to mend the situation Riko confronts Suzune and suggests that she clear things up with Natsuo after learning that both girls think that the other hates them. After school, Suzune makes her way to the council room and decides to do some cleaning while she waits for Riko and Natsuo; finding herself succumbing to her clumsiness just as the girls arrive. Natsuo takes that as inspiration and starts coming up with fantasies involving clumsiness, all of which are shot down by Riko. Afterwards, Natsuo and Suzune clear the air while the former expresses interest in the love lessons, while both girls simultaneously decide to refrain from lying, causing Riko to feel uncomfortable since she lied about having boyfriends to Natsuo. The next day, while the girls go through scenarios involving being carried by a guy, unbeknownst to them, another girl eavesdrops on their exchange. The next day, Riko and Natsuo start receiving harassment messages from the previous council president, Yuiko Enomoto and former treasurer, Sayori Mizushima who conspire to blackmail Riko and co. so that they can obtain their original council positions. As Natsuo and Riko realize who the messages originate from, Sayori startles them and starts inquiring about Natsuo's Dutch wife, but they end up spinning a web of lies which Sayori seems to buy, much to Riko's suspicion. Sayori later meets up with Yuiko and states that she declared war on Riko and co. much to Yuiko's shock.
3	"Sayo and Eno the Aggressors"; Transliteration: "Sensen Fukoku no Sayo to Eno" (Japanese: 宣戦布告のサヨとエノ)	Shōgo Arai	Kenji Sugihara	July 18, 2013	
While on her way to school, Riko remains bothered by Sayori's words and explains to Natsuo that their love lessons will have to be put on hiatus until Sayori's harassment stops. Meanwhile Yuiko and Sayori sneak into the council room and discover Natsuo's documents on love lessons. Later that day, Natsuo collapses in exhaustion from overwork while Yuiko devises a devious plan to use the love documents at the next council meeting. Riko tries to convince Sayori to rejoin the council although she states that she'll only return if Yuiko is reinstated as the president, something which Riko denies. Sayori goes on to explain Yuiko's traits until Yuiko herself abruptly enters the discussion and explains that she only wished for Natsuo to rely on her more before storming off, with Sayori lamenting on Yuiko's indecisiveness. Afterwards, Riko relays the information back to Natsuo and realize that she and Yuiko both want the other to rely on each other but keep letting their pride get in the way of their feelings. Elsewhere, another teacher mixes up the love documents with the committee documents and Yuiko mistakenly grabs the wrong pile after deciding not to follow through with her plan. The next day at the meeting, the love documents are discovered by its members and assume Natsuo had been behind those sort of lessons. Yuiko and Sayori enter the room and Riko shifts the blame to the former, which everyone seems to believe as plausible. As Natsuo becomes upset, Riko starts defending her along with the love learning notion although Sayori brilliantly comes up with a cover story by claiming that they were only researching the matter because of a note they received in the suggestion box. Finally at the end of the meeting, the student council members officially apologize to each other. Meanwhile outside the room, a girl drops a note into the suggestion box.
4	"Love Lab Research Resumes! or so we thought..." Transliteration: "Ren'ai Kenkyū Saikai! To Omottara……" (Japanese: 恋愛研究再開！と思ったら……)	Kaoru Yabana	Takamitsu Kōno	July 25, 2013	
With the student council finally repaired, Yuiko and Sayori join Riko and co. in their love lessons. As the lessons continue, Natsuo comes up with a new scenario for meeting a guy while hailing Riko as the teacher of their group. Yuiko and Sayori question why and learn that she has past relationship experience, shocking Riko that her lie is growing even larger, while silently Sayori doesn't seem to believe it. Afterwards the girls discuss blind dating. The next day the girls discuss how to attract guys by changing their hairstyles and Riko laments to herself that her own short hair hadn't done much for her on that front. Afterwards, Natsuo reports that they had received an anonymous note in the suggestion box from a girl asking for help on buying a present for a guy. Riko agrees to ask some guys on their preferences before she realizes that she can just obtain the information from magazines. Although, Sayori continues to pressure Riko, even giving her a camera to take pictures of the guy's she will ask. Yuiko starts teasing Natsuo about the "lingerie" prompting Yuiko and Sayori reveal to Riko and Suzune that Natsuo's family owns a lingerie company and her father had made a rather embarrassing promotional video and even named a training bra after her. Afterwards, Riko decides to take cram school and ask her past school mates about their preferences. As Sayori continues to pressure Riko, Suzune calls Sayori on her behavior causing her to back off, while silently admitting that it would be better if Riko had just confessed the lie. The next day, Riko returns with the results from her fellow cram school friends and the girls find that guy's preferences aren't what they had envisioned. Although, a new problem arises; how to let the anonymous girl know the results, to which Riko comes up with an idea of using their school's break time announcements.
5	"This is Fuji Girls' Love Station"; Transliteration: "Kochira Fuji Jo Ren'ai Hōsōkyoku" (Japanese: こちら藤女恋愛放送局)	Yoshiyuki Fujiwara	Takashi Aoshima	August 1, 2013	
At lunch, Natsuo and Yuiko head over to the Radio Broadcasting room and charm their way into preempting the regular broadcast order to announce the results of their findings to the anonymous girl. Simultaneously, Riko has Suzune and Sayori enter the Faculty Office to distract the teachers by using Suzune's clumsy demeanor to evoke their parental instincts. While this is happening, Natsuo and Yuiko continue with their broadcast by cleverly disguising it as an English tutorial using a prepared dialogue of two guys discussing their preferences in presents from girls, which they both pretend to be. Afterwards, with the broadcast a success, Riko fails to meet up with the Student Council, and later learn that she had sacrificed herself to detention by taking responsibility for the broadcast to the strict Ms. Sakagami, much to Natsuo's distress. At the same time, Riko had also been left with improving the score on her upcoming English exam by twenty percent for her English teacher, Ms. Yoshida as a further unexpected outcome of her plan. The next day, Riko is stuck being tutored English by Natsuo but can't seem to concentrate because of their usual antics. Natsuo disturbingly pulls out a male school uniform and Sayori has her cross-dress by pretending to be a guy called "Makio Maki" and teach Riko English. After Riko's English exam things seem to settle down a bit at the Student Council until they start discussing ways to meet guys. The next day, the girls receive a follow up letter from the anonymous girl and learn that while their advice was helpful, she had found herself in a love triangle but isn't going to give up and sincerely thanks them for their help. Meanwhile, two girls belonging to the Fujisaki Newspaper Society set their sights on uncovering what really goes on at the Student Council.
6	"Legend of the Worst Girl, Riko"; Transliteration: "Saitei Densetsu Riko" (Japanese: 最低伝説リコ)	Osamu Takahashi	Hideaki Koyasu	August 8, 2013	
Riko's younger brother, Rentarō Kurahashi teases Riko's tomboyish personality while their mother, Yumiko Kurahashi continues to motivate her daughter into becoming more feminine. With just Riko and Natsuo at the Council room that afternoon, they decide to suspend its activities and visit the mall. They bump into Sayori, and Riko is forced to show them how to get guys to approach a girl. Unbelievably, a guy does approach Riko and seems to know her, although she fails to recognize him. After feigning her way through a short chat, the guy runs away of embarrassment when it turns out Riko had rejected his confession a long time ago. The next day, Riko learns from Mika Kiriyama that an old acquaintance of hers, Masaomi Ikezawa had been asking about her at cram school, and after meeting him that same day, Riko unexpectedly encounters the guy from the mall, who flees at the sight of her. Riko chases the guy to a pedestrian crossing bridge where she reveals she hadn't remembered him although he brushes off Riko's curiosity before running off once more, just before she vaguely remembers him. Later, Riko's mother shows her a picture of the same guy, Satoshi Nagino, an old teammate of hers from grade school who had a feminine appearance back then. The next day, Riko and Natsuo wait to confront Satoshi before cram school, but he again flees at the sight of Riko. Giving chase, Riko stops Satoshi at the bridge and apologizes for not recognizing him, attributing it to his masculinity. As they begin chatting about how the other has changed, Riko ruins the conversation by involuntarily making a feminine comment about Satoshi. The next day, the Student Council starts receiving more letters asking for love help in the suggestion boxes and while collecting the boxes, Riko and Natsuo inadvertently let slip a hint to some letter contents to school journalists: Momoka Minami and Nana Ichikawa.
7	"To the Kurahashi Residence!"; Transliteration: "Iza Kurahashi-ke!" (Japanese: いざ倉橋家！)	Tomoaki Koshida	Kenji Sugihara	August 15, 2013	
Natsuo surprises Riko at the Council Room with a homemade gun that shoots party favors and explains that she intends to use it to make a guy's heart skip a beat, although Riko angrily tosses it out the window. Afterwards, Nana tries to retrieve the gun by climbing over a large wall as part of her news investigation but becomes stuck at the top and is hence discovered by Sayori and Yuiko before being rescued by Momoka. Yuiko and Sayori relay this to Riko and co. and decide that they should take precautionary measures to ensure that their love lessons aren't discovered. As the love lessons continue, the girls decide to continue with the topic of making a guy's heart skip a beat and Riko is forced to teach them how to slyly glance at a guy, although Natsuo goes overboard with Riko's advice. After deciding that they are still a ways away from actually approaching a guy, as shown my Suzune's timidity and Natsuo's experience with Masaomi, Riko invites the girls over to gain some experience by interacting with her brother Rentarō . The following day the girls show up at the Kurahashis' House and in addition to becoming smitten by Natsuo, Rentarō makes unrestrained comments about Sayori, Suzune and Yuiko prompting Riko to allow them to freely deject him. Afterwards, the girls spend the rest of the day in Riko's room where she narrowly dodges another situation whereby she would have had to reveal her lie to the group, while Rentarō keeps thinking about Natsuo. Afterwards, Rentarō asks Riko to find out what Natsuo thinks of elementary school boys and is disappointed by Natsuo's answer, prompting him to get back at Riko by showing their mother her poor tests results and gets her sent to cram school. Finally Riko once again encounters Masaomi and Satoshi at the cram school and has a rather heated argument about misunderstanding the latter's words when they last met.
8	"To the Wild One..."; Transliteration: "Wairudo na Kimi e……" (Japanese: ワイルドな君へ……)	Kiyoshi Fukumoto	Takamitsu Kōno	August 22, 2013	
After getting caught stalking Riko and Natsuo, Nana reveals that the Newspaper Club was demoted to an association by Sayori, and runs off in tears after revealing Natsuo's and Riko's nicknames, with the latter taking the "Wild One" branding particularly hard. Back at the Council Room Riko starts copying Natsuo's feminine characteristics in an attempt to avert her tomboyish personality, much to the disdain of her friends. Afterwards the Council receives more papers asking for love advice that were put out by Momoka and Nana. The next day, the Newspaper Association prepares a special article in an attempt to harass the Student Council into giving them back Club status. Meanwhile, as the Student Council comes up with answers for the love questions, they remain at a loss on what the Newspaper Association's true angle is and decide to split up and gather information. Afterwards, Momoka gives Riko and co. the harassment article which questions the Council's integrity. Meanwhile, Yuiko questions the former Newspaper Club adviser, Ms. Sugihara and learns that in ten days there would be a Newspaper contest which prohibits "Societies" from entering. As Yuiko returns with this startling information, Sayori leaves for the day after having a meet-up with her boyfriend, leaving the remaining members to deal with the Newspaper Association. Riko and Natsuo eventually confront Momoka with the love questions and learn that the Association wasn't trying to enter the contest after all. Meanwhile, on her way back from photographing Momoka's little brother's baseball game, Nana stumbles on Sayori's meetup and takes pictures which she plans on using to blackmail Sayori. However, the next day at school, they are both caught and detained by Ms. Sakagami and Sayori decides to quit being a member of the Council in order to protect her friends from the consequences of her illicit relationship.
9	"That Smile..."; Transliteration: "Sono Egao ga……" (Japanese: その笑顔が……)	Shōgo Arai	Takashi Aoshima	August 29, 2013	
Sayori returns to the Student Council room and reveals her sudden resignation from the Council due to the exposure of her illicit relationship to the teachers thanks to Nana's photo. Left in a state of shock, the girls try to deal with this revelation in their own way before Riko gathers the Council including Momoka and Nana to brainstorm ideas that would save Sayori, with Natsuo devising an ingenious plan involving her "Makio" persona. At the teachers intervention the next day, Makio unexpectedly bursts into the meeting along with Riko and co. and much to Sayori's shock, the girls begin weaving a web of lies built on some already established truths that the teachers were aware of. Yuiko shows them the fake love request submitted by Nana and explains that an anonymous student misinterpreted their previous radio broadcast. Riko continues that since Natsuo was not a person to turn away from a student's request, she dressed up like a boy to try and fulfill it with Sayori's help due to contact with actual boys being forbidden by the school. The girls then guilt the teachers into thinking they'd accept Sayori's confession without conducting a proper investigation and Natsuo strengthens this idea by claiming responsibility for the radio broadcast of which Ms. Sakagami wrongly blamed Riko, before threatening to quit the council. Believing that the teachers were wrong, Ms. Sakagami folds and lets the Student Council off with minor repercussions. Afterwards, as the Student Council reaffirms their friendship and success with their own unique expressions, Momoka thanks Ms. Sugihara for her help in getting the camera and remarks that she is happy with the state of their association as long as Nana regained her confidence. Finally, as Yuiko and Sayori walk home, the former fondly recalls the moment they accepted each other's friendship back in grade school.
10	"The Very Best of the Student Council (By Publisher Request)"; Transliteration: "Yorinuki Seitokai (Tori Oroshi)" (Japanese: よりぬき生徒会（撮り下ろし）)	Geisei Morita	Hideaki Koyasu	September 5, 2013	
With the Newspaper Association fiasco behind them, Riko and co. return their attention to the love requests they had been receiving in the suggestion boxes. However the girls first decide to address Sayori's plain fashion sense for the next date with her boyfriend.; Yū Yamazaki recalls his first meeting with Sayori when she transferred to his grade school and reveals that her family had been in a bit of financial turmoil at the time. This resulted in Sayori falling victim to bullying from her peers, but her stoic and realist personality helped her to easily overcome it, at the cost of making her a virtual loner. Yū eventually began liking Sayori after a childish incident which ended in her extorting him and later lamenting his wish to spend more time with her.; After school, Sayori visits Yuiko's house for her periodic chore of "slapping reality" into Yuiko's masochistic, shut-in older brother.; The girls discuss a photograph of a younger Suzune and her two older siblings who she explains used to compete with each other when doting on her. In contrast, they pity Yuiko's photos in which her brother constantly teases her.; Sayori decides to help reform Suzune by flicking her forehead every time she succumbs to her clumsy. Later that day, Natsuo notices and treats Suzune's hurt forehead. Afterwards, Suzune notices Yuiko helping two students in their cleaning duties and remarks on the former's sense of justice. Finally, Riko helps encourage Suzune when struggling at track and the latter fondly recalls that she only enjoys running when it helps take her to the Student Council room.; Note: This episode was organized into a series of disconnected shorts.
11	"Love Lab?"; Transliteration: "Ren'ai Rabo?" (Japanese: 恋愛ラボ？)	Kaoru Yabana	Kenji Sugihara	September 12, 2013	
The Student Council decides to have Riko survey guys at the Irikimi Cram School to accumulate responses for a love question regarding which hairstyles are most popular to guys attending the nearby South Middle School. Riko learns from Satoshi that guys at South Middle favor girls with silky, black hair in addition to idolizing Natsuo. Realizing that she is best able to answer the question, Natsuo comes up with various ridiculous situations to help showcase her hair to guys, all of which are rejected by Riko. Unbenknownt to Natsuo, her love research had been stumbled upon by her older sister who realizes that Natsuo's lack of male interaction had caused her yearning for romance to spiral out of control and hence making her emotionally vulnerable, and blames their over protective father, who enrolls Natsuo at the Irikimi Cram School to expand her social horizons. While taking a tour of the school, Masaomi calls Natsuo by her first name, causing the latter to panic and run off. After encountering Riko, Natsuo describes her ordeal which is thrown out of context and laments that a "popular girl" like Riko wouldn't be bothered by something so minuscule, to which Satoshi quickly pieces together Riko's deception. The next day, as Riko's conscience starts plaguing her, she discovers Natsuo still reeling from the previous day's events and helps Natsuo feel better at the cost of her own personal credibility. The next day, the Student Council begins their usual antics of pooling their various ideas together. Eventually the girls realize that they may have to cut back on answering love questions to keep their research from gaining unwanted attention in addition to balancing their other scholarly duties. Just then, Sayori notices the Newspaper Association eavesdropping on them and they deliver their latest issue which showcases a section called the "Love Lab Correspondence."
12	"Please Be My Friend Forever"; Transliteration: "Zutto Tomodachi de Ite Kudasai ne" (Japanese: ずっと友達でいてくださいね)	Yoshiyuki Fujiwara	Takamitsu Kōno	September 19, 2013	
Momoka and Nana reveal their intention of aiding the Student Council by disguising their love responses as fictional stories in the newly created "Love Lab Correspondence" section, which the latter all agree on. Simultaneously, Riko starts feeling the strain of deceiving Natsuo. At the cram school, Masaomi remarks that his interactions with Natsuo always end up awry leading Riko to assume his interest in her which he blatantly rejects. Eventually Riko decides to confess the truth to Natsuo, but never quite finds the opportune moment. While at the cram school the next day, unbeknownst to Riko, Natsuo encounters Satoshi in Mr. Irikimi's office and her inexperience with guys manifests itself before they have a brief chat, about his supposed "confession" to Riko. Afterwards, Satoshi explains to Riko of Natsuo's trust in her which aids her guilt. Meanwhile, much to his misfortune, Masaomi encounters Natsuo once again and after a brief chat, Natsuo starts speaking of Riko's "popularity." However Masaomi subverts Natsuo's view on Riko and questions their friendship, which Natsuo brushes off on the pretense of Masaomi being a horrible person. The next day, the Student Council devises a foolproof plot to draw the entire student body into their covert schemes. Afterwards, Riko joins Natsuo on a run around the school and upon finishing, the latter expresses her platonic love for Riko. This prompts Riko to finally confess the truth to Natsuo, before being interrupted and given detention by Ms. Yoshida. As Riko laments her unsuccessful attempt that evening, Mika approaches and teases her for giving love advice when she has no experience herself. However, much to Riko's horror Natsuo suddenly appears behind them and seems not to have heard their discussion before running off to the Student Council room. With Riko following in her wake, Natsuo's face shows a pained expression.
13	"Holding That Hand"; Transliteration: "Sono-te o Kasanete" (Japanese: その手を重ねて)	Shōgo Arai	Takashi Aoshima	September 26, 2013	
Natsuo uncharacteristically trips and falls over on her way to school, but Riko quickly helps and questions the former's unusual behavior. That afternoon, the Student Council's suspicions are piqued when Natsuo decides to skip love research to focus on council work. As this trend continues, Riko spirals into her guilt and resolves to confess the truth. The following day, Riko practices confessing the truth on Sayori while afterwards, Yuiko and Suzuno urge Riko to restore the usual air about the Student Council. Meanwhile in front of the cram school, Satoshi interrupts Natsuo's thought on Masaomi's words before they are both interrupted by one of Satoshi's teammates who refuses to believe Natsuo and Riko are friends. Natsuo defends Riko and describes her "popularity" to which Satoshi's friend reveals that Riko must have lied to her, on account of her true, violent personality, shocking Natsuo. As Riko shows up, Satoshi reveals his previous rejection by Riko and forces his friend to apologize. As a crowd starts gathering to view the commotion, Natsuo runs away and Satoshi urges Riko to go after her. Afterwards, Riko visits Natsuo's house and confesses the truth of her inexperience to Natsuo and tries and fails to quit the Student Council as penitence; calling Natsuo her best friend. Relieved that Masaomi's words were untrue, Natsuo forgives Riko and relishes the fact that they can share experiences from the same point of view; calling Riko her best friend. At the next day's Student Council meeting, Riko apologizes to Suzune, Yuiko and Sayori, who forgive her despite some slapstick punishment. Just then, Momoka and Nana enter and reveal the completed first issue of the underground newspaper. Finally the group excitedly starts preparing for the second issue, with Riko officially declaring the start of their next "Love Lab" meeting.

== Home media ==
Aniplex released the series in Japan on seven Blu-ray and DVD volumes between September 20, 2013, and March 28, 2014. The box artwork of each volume was drawn by Ruri Miyahara. The complete series was released on Blu-ray and DVD volumes by Sentai Filmworks on August 5, 2014.

Aniplex (Region 2 - Japan)
Vol.	Episodes	Blu-ray / DVD artwork	Bonus disc	Release date	Ref.
1	1	Riko Kurahashi	Music CD - (恋愛（ラブ）したいっ！)	September 20, 2013	
2	2, 3	Natsuo Maki	Music CD – Best FriendS	October 25, 2013	
3	4, 5	Suzune Tanahashi	Original Soundtrack Volume 1	November 29, 2013	
4	6, 7	Yuiko Enomoto	Drama CD Volume 1	December 27, 2013	
5	8, 9	Sayori Mizushima	Original Soundtrack Volume 2	January 31, 2014	
6	10, 11	Riko & Natsuo	Drama CD Volume 2	February 28, 2014	
7	12, 13	Riko, Natsuo, Yuiko, Sayori & Suzune	Original Soundtrack Volume 3	March 28, 2014	

Sentai Filmworks (Region 1 - North America)
Vol.	Episodes	Blu-ray / DVD artwork	BD / DVD Release date	BD Ref.	DVD Ref.
1	1–13	Riko, Natsuo, Yuiko, Sayori & Suzune	August 5, 2014		
