= Koikeda =

Koikeda may refer to:

- 49702 Koikeda, a main-belt asteroid, named after Japanese amateur astronomer Chuzo Koikeda (b. 1928)
- Maya Koikeda (born 1969), pen name of a Japanese manga artist Keiko Yamada
