= Re-Kan! =

Japanese manga and anime series

- Cover of Re-Kan! volume 1 by Houbunsha

レーカン! (Rēkan!)
- Genre: Comedy, supernatural
- Manga
- Written by: Hinako Seta
- Published by: Houbunsha
- Magazine: Manga Time Jumbo; (February 2010 – April 2018); Manga Time; (May 2018 – August 2025)
- Original run: February 2010 – August 7, 2025
- Volumes: 16
- Anime television series
- Directed by: Masashi Kudō
- Produced by: Tadakazu Hiraga; Tsuguharu Sakurai; Gou Tanaka; Shinji Sekigawa; Tarou Tamada; Atsushi Yoshikawa; Daisuke Konda
- Written by: Takahashi Aoshima
- Music by: Hiroyuki Kōzu
- Studio: Pierrot+
- Licensed by: AUS: Hanabee; NA: Sentai Filmworks; UK: MVM Films
- Original network: TBS, CBC, TUT, Sun TV, BS-TBS
- Original run: April 3, 2015 – June 26, 2015
- Episodes: 13

Re-Kan! (レーカン!, Rēkan!; lit. 'Sixth Sense!') is a Japanese four-panel manga series by Hinako Seta, serialized in Houbunsha's Manga Time Jumbo magazine. Re-Kan! was first published as a one-shot in Manga Time Jumbo's December 2009 issue, and it later began serialization with the February 2010 issue. It has been collected into twelve tankōbon volumes. A 13-episode anime television series adaptation by Pierrot+ aired in Japan between April and June 2015.

== Overview ==
High school girl Hibiki Amami has a sixth sense of perceiving and interacting with ghosts and supernatural beings, as well as talking with cats and other animals, but none of her peers share that ability. After transferring to Hanazuka Prefectural High School, she becomes friends with some classmates who put up with her antics, including class representative Narumi Inoue, who despises anything related to the occult. The story follows their everyday antics.

== Characters ==
=== Humans ===
Hibiki Amami (天海 響, Amami Hibiki)
Voiced by: Ibuki Kido (anime), Aya Endō (drama CD)
A beautiful high school student who has the ability to sense and to interact with supernatural beings such as ghosts and spirits, passed down from her late mother. She is very polite and always treats both humans and ghosts alike with respect.
Narumi Inoue (井上 成美, Inoue Narumi)
Voiced by: Miku Itō (anime), Haruka Tomatsu (drama CD)
Hibiki's classmate who becomes friends with her, despite being generally terrified of the ghosts surrounding her. She is usually not too honest with her feelings and is considered a "granny's girl", often being haunted by the spirit of her late grandmother.
Kana Uehara (上原 佳菜, Uehara Kana)
Voiced by: Riho Iida (anime), Kana Hanazawa (drama CD)
Hibiki's classmate who is childhood friends with Kyōko. Her hobby is taking pictures of ghosts, which become visible when viewed through a cellphone camera, and uploading them to her top-ranked supernatural blog.
Kyōko Esumi (江角 京子, Esumi Kyōko)
Voiced by: M.A.O (anime), Eri Kitamura (drama CD)
Hibiki's classmate who is childhood friends with Kana. She has a rough personality, usually being the first to attack Kenta when he acts stupid, but is compassionate and helps those in trouble. She is a former delinquent, with the nickname "Red-haired Messiah" (灼髪の救世主, Shakuhatsu no Meshia), almost always getting angry when someone brings it up.
Makoto Ogawa (小川 真琴, Ogawa Makoto)
Voiced by: Erii Yamazaki (anime), Ayana Taketatsu (drama CD)
Hibiki's classmate. A bright and cheerful airhead who has an obsession with creepily made zombie dolls, of which her friends are often fearful.
Kenta Yamada (山田 健太, Yamada Kenta)
Voiced by: Yoshitaka Yamaya (anime), Yusuke Shirai (drama CD)
Hibiki's classmate, and the sole male in her group of friends. Often considered a doofus among his friends, his overly cheerful attitude and sometimes dimwitted remarks often get him clobbered by Kyōko.
Asahi Amami (天海 朝陽, Amami Asahi)
Voiced by: Wataru Hatano (anime), Shin-ichiro Miki (drama CD)
Hibiki's father. Similar to Narumi, he doesn't like ghosts, and the relationship with his wife and her supernatural ability made his hair turn prematurely white over a short duration of time.
Yūki Inoue (井上 勇希, Inoue Yūki)
Voiced by: Ayahi Takagaki (anime), Sumire Uesaka (drama CD)
Narumi's younger cousin, whose father died.
Masaki Yamada (山田 正輝, Yamada Masaki)
Voiced by: Shuhei Kajikawa
Kenta's older brother who works as a police officer. He has a crush on Kyōko, whom he had previously encountered during her delinquent days.

=== Ghosts ===
Roll Call Samurai (代返侍, Daihenzamurai)
Voiced by: Yoshihisa Kawahara (anime), Kenyu Horiuchi (drama CD)
The ghost of a samurai who died of starvation. After Amami gave him food, he started to protect her and do anything for her in any way he can, such as answering to her teacher for roll call when Hibiki falls asleep in class.
Hanako-san (花子さん, Hanako-san)
Voiced by: Mikako Izawa (anime)
A spirit who haunts one of the stalls in the school's girls' restroom.
Ero-neko (エロ猫, Eroneko)
Voiced by: Kujira (anime), Norio Wakamoto (drama CD)
A cute but lecherous cat that constantly tries to take peeks at girls' panties, though is often thwarted by the ghosts protecting Hibiki.
Mary-san (メリーさん, Merī-san)
Voiced by: Eriko Matsui (anime)
A ghost with long grey hair who haunts others, usually Kana, through phone calls.
Kogal Spirit (コギャル霊, Kogyaru-rei)
Voiced by: Aya Uchida (anime), Aimi Terakawa (drama CD)
A kogal ghost girl who initially possesses Hibiki in order to make peace with her mother, but chooses to stick around. She appears to have a rivalry with the Roll Call Samurai.
Neckless Spirit (首無し霊, Kubi-nashi-rei) / Faceless Spirit (顔なし霊, Kao-nashi-rei)
Voiced by: Futaba Kino (anime)
A ghost girl in a sailor uniform who carries a red umbrella, which she offers to those who need shelter from the rain. She has no neck in the manga and no face in the anime.
Bound Spirit of the Park (公園の地縛霊, Kōen no Jibakurei)
Voiced by: Tsuguo Mogami (anime), Nobuo Tobita (drama CD)
A jibakurei that protects the local park, bound to the sign at the entrance. His figure is never seen.
Yūhi Amami (天海 夕陽, Amami Yūhi)
Voiced by: Yūko Minaguchi (anime), Kyōko Hikami (drama CD)
Hibiki's late mother, who died when Hibiki was born. While alive, her sixth sense was said to be much stronger than her daughter's, and she occasionally made prophecies with her ability. She currently resides within Hibiki's memories, looking after a trellis of flowers giving Hibiki her sixth sense.
Narumi's Grandmother (成美の祖母, Narumi no Sobo)
The spirit of Inoue's grandmother who is constantly watching over her.

== Media ==
=== Manga ===
The original manga by Hinako Seta was first published in Houbunsha's Manga Time Jumbo magazine in the December 2009 issue, and went into serialization from February 2010. An anthology comic was released on May 7, 2015. It moved to Manga Time for the May issue on April 7, 2018, when Jumbo was discontinued. Sixteen tankōbon volumes have been released from August 6, 2011, to November 7, 2025. It ended serialization on August 7, 2025.

=== Anime ===
A 13-episode anime television series adaptation by Pierrot+ aired in Japan between April 3, 2015, and June 26, 2015, and was simulcast by Crunchyroll. The opening and ending themes respectively are "Colorful Story" (カラフルストーリー, Karafuru Sutōrī) and "Kesaran Pasaran" (ケサランパサラン), both performed by every♥ing! (Ibuki Kido and Erii Yamazaki). Sentai Filmworks has licensed the anime for digital and home video release in North America.

==== Episode list ====
No.	Title	Original release date
1	"I Can See Them." "Watashi, Mierun desu." (わたし、視(み)えるんです。)	April 3, 2015
Narumi Inoue, a girl with a fear of the paranormal, meets Hibiki Amami, a girl who can communicate with ghosts. On the way home from school, the two visit a park, where Hibiki suddenly leaves Narumi alone to run an errand. Narumi comes across a group of kids, who she plays with; they are later revealed to be ghosts.
2	"This Is My Friend." "Watashi no, Otomodachi desu." (わたしの、お友達です。)	April 10, 2015
Hibiki finds herself sleep-deprived after a nightmare involving a perverted cat. Numerous ghosts come to her aid at school, including the "Roll Call Samurai", who is indebted to Hibiki after she fed him well. Hibiki later visits a faceless umbrella-toting spirit rumoured to offer her umbrella to people in exchange for their face.
3	"Delicious Fried Eggs." "Oishī, Tamagoyaki desu." (美味しい、卵焼きです。)	April 17, 2015
Narumi tries to appease her bossy younger cousin Yuki, who is picky about the fried eggs she makes. As Narumi and Hibiki try to find out how to satisfy Yuki, they learn from his mother that he wants the eggs his late father used to make. Following a recipe from the ghost of Narumi's grandmother, Narumi manages to make the eggs that Yuki wanted to eat.
4	"Summer Means the Beach." "Natsu to Ieba, Umi desu." (夏といえば、海です。)	April 24, 2015
The girls go on a trip to the beach, where Kyōko Esumi, a former delinquent, becomes concerned about classmate Kenta Yamada bringing his brother, a police officer who had developed a crush on her.
5	"The Legendary Culture Festival." "Densetsu no, Bunkasai desu." (伝説の、文化祭です。)	May 1, 2015
As the girls prepare a haunted house for the school festival, one featuring actual ghosts, they get to meet Hibiki's father, Asahi, who recounts how Hibiki got her sixth sense from her late mother.
6	"A Super Awesome Holy Night." "Choberigu na, Seiya desu." (チョベリグな、聖夜です。)	May 8, 2015
Hibiki is possessed by a kogal ghost, who wants to use her body to say goodbye to someone so she can pass on, and learns about how Kana Uehara doesn't get to spend much time with her parents because of their careers. After the ghost eventually manages to say goodbye to her living mother, she encourages Kana to spend Christmas with her parents.
7	"A Busy New Year." "Nigiyaka na, Toshiake desu." (にぎやかな、年明けです。)	May 15, 2015
Concerned about Hibiki's increasing fatigue due to constantly helping spirits out, the others give her special glasses to cut off her sixth sense so she can get some rest. However, when a child goes missing, Hibiki is forced to take them off in order to get help from her ghost friends. Later, Hibiki and the others celebrate New Year's Day, sharing the fun with humans and ghosts alike.
8	"Let's All Play Together." "Min'na de, Issho ni Asobun desu." (みんなで、一緒に遊ぶんです。)	May 22, 2015
With a lot of buzz surrounding a pair of teachers, Moriya and Kimura, who recently got engaged to each other, Hibiki comes across the ghost of a young girl who appears to be losing her memories, meaning that she won't be able to pass on if she forgets her lingering attachment. As Hibiki and the others spend time with her, they find that she has some connection to Moriya. While Hibiki has Moriya spend some time with the ghost, the others learn from Kimura that the ghost was a sickly girl Moriya was friends with when he was hospitalized as a child. Later that night, after Hibiki catches a glimpse of her memories, the ghost, having fulfilled her promise of meeting Moriya again, gives her farewell to him on his wedding day and passes on.
9	"The Secret Valentine." "Himitsu no, Barentain desu." (秘密の、バレンタインです。)	May 29, 2015
With Valentine's Day approaching, the gang become curious when Hibiki starts looking up how to make homemade chocolates. Determined to find out if she has a crush or not, Narumi and the others follow Hibiki to the park. There, she meets up with a notoriously grumpy old man, who they assume is the one she has a crush on. When Valentine's Day arrives, Hibiki gives him azuki bean chocolates she made based on his late wife's recipe in order to fulfil her Valentine's wish, after which she shares some chocolates with her friends.
10	"We've Entered Our Second Year." "Iyoiyo, Ninen-sei desu." (いよいよ、2年生です。)	June 5, 2015
Upon entering her second year of high school, Hibiki quickly ends up scaring the new freshmen when she tries to get her ghost friends to help them out. When giving Hibiki an image change fails to work, the other try giving the ghosts themselves a makeover, which has similarly bad luck. Later, zombie enthusiast Makoto Ogawa creates a teddy bear for Roll Call Samurai to possess, explaining how an old amateur manga inspired her love of creepy zombie dolls. When another spirit possesses Makoto's zombie doll and starts leading her somewhere, the girls receive help from the umbrella ghost to help the spirit pass on. The next day, Hibiki's attraction to ghosts leads some of her underclassmen to end up liking her.
11	"My Wish." "Watashi no, Onegai desu." (私の、お願いです。)	June 12, 2015
Hibiki invites everyone over to celebrate Tanabata, claiming that her family's wishes really do come true. As everyone tries to come up with wishes, Roll Call Samurai and the Kogal Spirit notice Hibiki holding back from hanging up a wish to see her mother, who died when she was born. Having sensed a warm feeling when the Kogal Spirit possessed Hibiki before, the two ghosts venture inside Hibiki's memories, where they meet with Hibiki's mother, Yūhi, who had been watching over Hibiki from within her memories. Yūhi explains that even though she wants to see Hibiki herself, she can't leave as she needs to keep her power going in order to protect a trellis of morning glory flowers from wilting. To this end, Hibiki's ghost friends offer to temporarily take Yūhi's place, allowing her to finally meet with her daughter. The next morning, however, Hibiki discovers she is no longer able to see or hear ghosts.
12	"We Are All Connected." "Minna, Tsunagatte Irun desu." (みんな、つながっているんです。)	June 19, 2015
Narumi and the others quickly become aware of Hibiki's situation, unable to see the ghosts through their phones either. As Hibiki passes out from anxiety over not being able to see her ghost friends, she stays at home, unable to face the others. Concerned that Hibiki hasn't been eating properly, Narumi asks Asahi to teach her how to cook Yūhi's fried eggs, getting Hibiki to eat and open up to her. Hibiki laments the loss of the bonds she formed with the ghosts. Narumi decides to take her outside, where they encounter all the people she's helped thanks to her sixth sense, before meeting with Yuki and his new little sister Kyouka, who was partially named after Hibiki as thanks for her help, showing that even without her sixth sense, she still has so many bonds. The kindness Hibiki feels from Narumi's friendship restores the flowers in her soul, bringing back her sixth sense and her ghost friends.
13	"Summer Memories." "Natsu no, Omoide desu." (夏の、思い出です。)	June 26, 2015
Hibiki and the others go to an amusement park, with Kyōko and Kana inviting the ghosts to come along. The group pay a visit to the park's haunted house, resulting in unique reactions from both the living and the dead. Later, Hibiki comes across a girl helping a lost child, who she soon remembers was someone who helped her when she was lost as a child. Afterwards, everyone comes over to Hibiki's house for a sleepover, where Hibiki helps Narumi sleep through the night.

== Reception ==
=== Previews ===
Anime News Network (ANN) had three editors review the first episode of the anime: Theron Martin gave praise to the humor being mostly delivered by both Inoue and Amami, and the upbeat, sugary charm used throughout the episode; Rebecca Silverman found the episode confused with either being a comedic or slice-of-life supernatural show and preferred that it stick with the latter subgenre with its human moments and work out its comedy elements. The third reviewer, Jacob Hope Chapman, heavily criticized the show's cheap production for its workmanlike animation clashing with the shoddy CG backgrounds and felt the humor was undone by poor direction and writing. He concluded that there's similar anime with better writing and aesthetics compared to this, saying that, "There's just not anything unique or intriguing about this one."

=== Series ===
Fellow ANN editor Paul Jensen reviewed the complete anime series in 2016. He commended the spiritual humor, the different interactions both Narumi and Hibiki have with the ghosts, and the moments of sweetness and melancholia throughout the various episodic storylines but was critical of the series overall not pushing forward its brand of comedy and drama beyond mildly entertaining and lacked the "sense of wonder or magic" humans have when interacting with spirits in their world compared to similar otherworldly series like Mushi-Shi and Flying Witch, concluding that "On the whole Re-Kan! is an enjoyable show that's worth a look if you've got a taste for lighthearted comedy or the slice of life genre in general." Allen Moody from THEM Anime Reviews was critical of Hibiki's supporting cast being made up of "one-trick ponies," the show's sentimental tales consisting of "mawkish, featherweight drama" and the lazily drawn ghost designs, but praised both episodes involving Inoue's cousin and the kogal ghost, and the slasher victim as his favorite character.
