= Weekly Manga Times =

Japanese manga magazine

- Cover of 18 April 2008 issue.
- Categories: Seinen
- Frequency: Weekly
- Circulation: 380,000 (2006)
- First issue: November 1956
- Company: Houbunsha
- Country: Japan
- Language: Japanese
- Website: shukanmanga.jp

Weekly Manga Times (週刊漫画TIMES, Shūkan Manga Taimusu) is a Japanese weekly manga magazine for men published by Houbunsha since November 1956. The publisher claims it was Japan's first weekly manga magazine, and the magazine is published every Friday. While its name resembles that of its sister magazine Manga Time, it does not publish yonkoma manga. The magazine is also known by the nickname Shūman (週漫), and uses the slogan "Live Happily Once a Week!" (一週間をユカイに生きる!, Isshūkan o Yukai ni Ikiru!). Manga Times has a weekly circulation of about 380,000.

Weekly Manga Times became known as one of the big three weekly manga magazines along with Weekly Manga Goraku, published by Nihon Bungeisha, and Manga Sunday, published by Jitsugyo no Nihon Sha. From 1969 until 1980, the magazine advertised on the outfield fence at Meiji Jingu Stadium.

A one-panel manga by Sunao Hari titled Weekend Egao was published on the table of contents page until the spring of 2008 when it was moved to the last page. Additionally, the interior paper was changed to use a higher quality white paper rather than the standard lower grade newsprint.

The cover of Weekly Manga Times has featured a realistic painting of a young woman on every issue. The cover artist since the April 1970 issue has been Keizō Tsukamoto, for which he won a spot in the Guinness Book of World Records for "the world's longest continuous career illustrating one magazine".

Weekly Manga Times also featured a series titled The Smiling Million People University (百万人のお笑い大学, Hyakumannin no Owarai Daigaku). The series was a one-panel comic which was used to fill blank space within each issue and consisted of submissions from readers which were judged by veteran manga artist, Taira Hara. As the entries consisted of reader submissions, the authors and artists were constantly changing.

== Currently serialized works ==
Listed alphabetically by title.

- Coin Locker Monogatari (author Tsunehisa Itō, artist Shinji Miyagi)
- Haruka no Sue (author Disk-Furai, artist Yasumasa Nishizaki)
- Honjitsu no Burger(Today's Burger) (author Rei Hanagata, artist Umetaro Saitani)
- Janus Oni no Ichizoku (Hayate Kuku)
- Issho ni kurasu tameno Yakusoku wo ikutsuka (Ahiru Okano)
- Kamisama Biyori (Masahiro Morio)
- Koryōriya Minako (Takeshi Miya, created by Takayuki Minami)
- Kowashiya Gen (author Hideki Hoshino, artist Sadayoshi Ishii)
- Kura no Yado – Yuki to Hana to (author Yūji Nishi, artist Toshinobu Tana)
- Madoromi Barmaid (Pao Hayakawa)
- Myōgatani Namidasaka Shinryōsho (author Jun Ujitani, artist Tsuguo Kōgo)
- Ripe for the Picking (Azusa Itakura)
- Toshokan no Aruji (Umiharu Shinohara)
- Wakaokusama Kiki ippatsu (Emai Komotoda)

=== Occasional series ===
- Chabashira Club (Sachiko Aoki)
- Drive Gohan (Ariyuki Hirosue)
- Higurashi Fudosan Akishitsu ari (Hiroshi Itaba)
- Kimi no Kazoku (Samematio)
- Mushoi (Tomomi Satō)
- Tsuribune Misakimaru (Kenichi Eguchi)
- Tokkō no Shima (Shūhō Satō)

== Previously serialized works ==
Listed alphabetically by title.

- A Chef of Nobunaga (author Mitsuru Nishimura, artist Takurō Kajikawa)
- Aisazu ni Irarenai (author Umine Hijikata, artist Yū Matsuhisa)
- Akahana deka (author Suisei Ogawa, artist Ikki Matsuda)
- Anokoro orewa Jyoshikōsei (Shō Arai)
- Barista (author Rei Hanagata, artist Kumi Muronaga)
- Bengoshi Tasuke (author Hōdō Harimura, artist Jun Hayase, irregular publication)
- Boku no Mini (Hiroki Nakagawa)
- Bura con (Chōsuke Nagasima)
- Cheese no Jikan (author Satoshi Hanagata, artist Yoshinobu Yamaguchi)
- Coffee Dream (author Satoshi Hanagata, artist Osamu Hiramatsu, irregular publication)
- Daboshatsu no Ten (Toshiya Masaoka)
- Daigaku no Oyabun (Baron Yoshimoto)
- Dokudami Tenement (Takashi Fukutani)
- Dokure-mono (author Tsunehisa Itō, Kenji Tagami)
- Darwin no Houteishi (author Hideyuki Ishizeki, Tsuyoshi Masuda)
- Doterai yatsu (author Kobako Hanato, Masamichi Yokoyama)
- Earth (Ayumi Tachihara)
- Fukushû no Kyojû (author Sergio Seki, Kōhei Tutsumi)
- Fûryû Tsumami-dōjō (Lasswell Hosoki)
- Getabaki Kâchan (Kojirō)
- Goshujin-sama to Yobanaide (author Yōusuke Moriguchi, Atsuchi Kuragami)
- Hachimaki Ojisan (Taku Shiraki)
- Hagawa no Ijô na Aijô (Takahiro Ôba)
- Haisai Shinbun Bunkaseikatsubu (author Tarô Takatsu, Osamu Hiramatsu)
- Hana Trail (Osamu Hiramatsu)
- Hashire! Bankman (Hiroshi Takano)
- Hatsukoi Drug (Ayumu Nanase)
- Himawari kun (Nobuyuki Kômasu)
- Honō no Bartender (Atsushi Mori, created by Ryūsei Kaji, irregular publication)
- Ikusa gaki(Fumiyasu Ishikawa, created by Gorō Oki)
- Immoral (Shūichi Sakanabe)
- Jotei (author Ryō Kurashina, artist Issaku Wake)
- Kanojo de Ippai (Johji Manabe)
- King size (author Ikkō Shimizu, Masamichi Yokoyama)
- Koe hime (Takeshi Takebayashi)
- Konikura Jîsan (Yoshirō Kamachi)
- Kura no Yado (author Yūji Nishi, artist Toshinobu Tana)
- Labyrinth, jp:雅亜公 (Ma'ako)
- Love 30 jp:ラブ30 (Ma'ako)
- Love-ho na Oshigoto (Chōsuke Nagashima)
- Maruhi Shanai Ren'ai (each story is by a different artist/author)
- Masashi-kun (Masashi Ueda)
- Matori (author Seiji Hosono, artist Tadashi Ichinose)
- Miyamoto Musashi (Baron Yoshimoto)
- Nagareboshi no Yado (author Yūji Nishi, Toshinobu Tana)
- Nanoka Dôsei (Shûichi Sakabe)
- Nice Middle Jōjima Buchō (Hitsuji Mitani, simultaneously serialized in Manga Time)
- Omoidebashi Garakutahonpo (Keizō Yoshiie)
- Onna-gui (author Yoshinori Hiroyama, Takeshi Mine)
- Onna Kansatsui (author Rō Hatta, Chikae Ide)
- Otoko-gui (author Tsunehisa Itō, Tsuguo Kougo)
- Pasta de Buono (Ryûji Okita)
- Pink gal (Yukio Shishikura)
- Rape (Shūichi Sakanabe)
- Rokusan Tengoku (Noboru Baba, 1961–1967)
- Sagishi Ippei (author Yōichi Nishi, Junichi Miyata)
- Salaryman Kaneshirō (Shō Tanaka)
- Shinmanga bungaku zenshu (Sadao Shōji)
- Shōwa Jōwa (Hiroshi Kurogane)
- Tokoton Toshiko (Toshiko Hara)
- Tokusō Deka (author Kōichi Iiboshi, Taka Momonari)
- TsumaSho (Yayū Murata)
- Yakubyō-gami (author Hiroyuki Kurokawa, Yōji Iori)
- Yasuji no Ninkyōdō (Yasuji Tanioka)
- Yaju keisatsu (author Kōichi Saitō, Takeshi Mine)
- Yoshiji no Shūkan Enikki (Yoshiji Suzuki, series ended in 2004 when the author died)
