= Kei Aoyama =

Japanese manga artist

Kei Aoyama 青山 景
- Born: September 26, 1979 Japan
- Died: October 2011 (aged 32) Komae, Tokyo, Japan
- Area: Manga artist
- Notable works: Swweeet; Yoiko no Mokushiroku
- Awards: 1st Ikiman (2003)

Kei Aoyama (青山 景, Aoyama Kei; September 26, 1979 – October 2011) was a Japanese manga artist. He graduated from the Department of Visual Communication Design at Musashino Art University. He made his professional debut in 2003 with the one-shot "Chaban Geki", winning Monthly Ikki magazine's Ikiman award for rookie artists. On October 9, 2011, an employee of Aoyama's publisher Kodansha called the police because they had not been able to contact him for several days. The police broke into Aoyama's Tokyo apartment and found him dead in a suicide by hanging. Two days later on October 11, 2011, Kodansha published the last completed chapter of his manga series Yoiko no Mokushiroku in Evening magazine. On February 23, 2012, Shogakukan released a collection of Aoyama's early works titled The Dog Race: Aoyama Kei Shoki Sakuhin-shū (THE DOG RACE 青山景初期作品集). The volume contains eight one-shots, including Aoyama's university graduation project and several previously unreleased manga.

== Works ==
=== One-shots ===
- "Chaban Geki" (Monthly Ikki May 2003, Shogakukan)
- "Drip" (Monthly Ikki October 2003, Shogakukan)
- "Pikōn!" (Monthly Ikki August 2004, Shogakukan)

=== Serializations ===
- Swweeet (Monthly Ikki April 2005 – June 2006, Shogakukan)
- Strobe Light (Continue Vols. 33–43, 45–46, Ohta Publishing)
- China Girl (script by Rei Hanagata, Big Comic 2009 No. 3–11, Shogakukan)
- Yoiko no Mokushiroku (Evening 2010 No. 18 – 2011 No. 21, Kodansha)

=== Anthologies ===
- Pikōn! (February 27, 2007, Shogakukan)
  - collects "Pikōn!" and "School Attack Syndrome", both adapted from works of the same name by Ōtarō Maijō
- The Dog Race: Aoyama Kei Shoki Sakuhin-shū (February 23, 2012, Shogakukan)
  - collects "Fake Fur", "Untitled", "Kuroi UFO", "Kuroi UFO '05", "Ririkachua", "The Dog Race", "Drip", and "Chaban Geki"
