= Aji Ichi Monme =

Japanese manga series

- First volume cover

味いちもんめ
- Genre: Cooking
- Manga
- Written by: Zenta Abe (S1); Yukie Fukuda (S2–4); Rei Hanagata (S5); Rokuro Kube (S6)
- Illustrated by: Yoshimi Kurata
- Published by: Shogakukan
- Magazine: Big Comic Original Zōkan; (1986); Big Comic Superior; (1987–present)
- Original run: 1986 – present
- Volumes: 87
- Series titles
- 1. Aji Ichi Monme (1986–1999, 33 volumes); 2. Shin Aji Ichi Monme (1999–2008, 21 volumes); 3. Aji Ichi Monme: Dokuritsu-hen (2008–2013, 10 volumes); 4. Aji Ichi Monme: Nippon Shoku Kiko (2013–2016, 6 volumes); 5. Aji Ichi Monme: Sekai no Naka no Washoku (2016–2017, 2 volumes); 6. Aji Ichi Monme: Tsugi Aji (2018–present, 15 volumes)
- Manga

Tabete Kaku! Mangaka-shoku Kikō
- Written by: Zenta Abe
- Illustrated by: Yoshimi Kurata
- Published by: Shogakukan
- Magazine: Big Comic Superior
- Original run: May 26, 2017 – August 10, 2018
- Volumes: 3
- Television drama
- Studio: TV Asahi; Toei Company
- Original network: ANN (TV Asahi)
- Original run: January 12, 1995 – March 21, 1996
- Episodes: 21 + 4 specials
- icon

Aji Ichi Monme (Japanese: 味いちもんめ) (Note: The title is a play on the name of a children's game, hana ichi monme, with aji meaning 'taste'.) is a Japanese manga series written by Zenta Abe and illustrated by Yoshimi Kurata. The series chronicles the lives of the staff and customers of a restaurant called Fujimura, owned by veteran chef Kumano. It was published by Shogakukan in Big Comic Superior from 1986 to 1999. After the death of Abe in 1999, other series have been released with other writers. The sixth series, Aji Ichi Monme: Tsugi Aji, began in 2018.

A television drama adaptation was broadcast on TV Asahi for two seasons in 1995 and 1996. Four specials were released in 1997, 1998, 2011, and 2013.

In 1999, Aji Ichi Monme won the 44th Shogakukan Manga Award in the general category.

== Media ==
=== Manga ===
Written by Zenta Abe and illustrated by Yoshimi Kurata, Aji Ichi Monme started in Shogakukan's seinen manga magazine Big Comic Original Zōkan in 1986, and was transferred in 1987 to Big Comic Superior, where it ran until 1999, following Abe's death in March of that same year. Shogakukan collected its chapters in 33 tankōbon volumes, published from May 30, 1986, to September 30, 1999.

After Abe's death, Yukie Fukuda served as the series writer, and a sequel, titled Shin Aji Ichi Monme (新 味いちもんめ), was serialized in Big Comic Superior from 1999 to 2008. Shogakukan collected its chapters in 21 tankōbon volumes, released from January 29, 2000, to March 28, 2008.

A third series, titled Aji Ichi Monme: Dokuritsu-hen (味いちもんめ 独立編), was serialized in Big Comic Superior from 2008 to 2013. Shogakukan collected its chapters in ten tankōbon volumes, released from September 30, 2008, to April 30, 2013.

A fourth series, titled Aji Ichi Monme: Nippon Shoku Kiko (味いちもんめ にっぽん食紀行), was serialized in Big Comic Superior from March 22, 2013, to March 25, 2016. Shogakukan collected its chapters in six tankōbon volumes, released from October 30, 2013, to May 30, 2016.

A fifth series, titled Aji Ichi Monme: Sekai no Naka no Washoku (味いちもんめ 世界の中の和食) was serialized in Big Comic Superior from May 27, 2016, to May 12, 2017. It was written by Rei Hanagata instead of Fukuda. Shogakukan collected its chapters in two tankōbon volumes, released on December 28, 2016, and July 28, 2017.

A sixth series, titled Aji Ichi Monme: Tsugi Aji (味いちもんめ -継ぎ味-), started in Big Comic Superior on December 28, 2018. The series is written in collaboration with Rokuro Kube. Shogakukan published the first tankōbon volume on June 28, 2019. As of February 27, 2026, 15 volumes have been published.

==== Other series ====
An extra story, titled Aji ichi Monme: Tabete Kaku! Mangaka-shoku Kikō (味いちもんめ 食べて・描く! 漫画家食紀行), was serialized in Big Comic Superior from May 26, 2017, to August 10, 2018. Each chapter features a guest manga artist. Shogakukan collected its chapters in three tankōbon volumes, released from October 30, 2017, to September 28, 2018.

A short series, titled Aji Ichi Monme: Fujimura Tayori (味いちもんめ 藤村便り) was serialized in Big Comic Superior from August 24 to December 14, 2018.

=== Drama ===
A 10-episode television drama adaptation was broadcast on TV Asahi from January 12 to March 16, 1995. A second season, subtitled Kyoto-hen (京都編), was broadcast from January 11 to March 21, 1996. Four specials were broadcast on January 2, 1997; January 2, 1998; January 8, 2011; and May 11, 2013.

== Reception ==
The overall series has had over 8 million copies in circulation.

In 1999, the series won the 44th Shogakukan Manga Award in the general category.
