= Madoromi Barmaid =

Japanese manga series

- First tankōbon volume cover

まどろみバーメイド (Madoromi Bāmeido)
- Genre: Drama
- Manga
- Written by: Pao Hayakawa
- Published by: Houbunsha
- Imprint: Houbunsha Comics
- Magazine: Weekly Manga Times
- Original run: March 10, 2017 – present
- Volumes: 19
- Television drama
- Directed by: Chihiro Ikeda; Go Furukawa
- Produced by: Satoru Egawa; Kôki Okamoto; Yûya Tanaka
- Written by: Hirofumi Tanaka; Tomoyuki Ueno
- Music by: Benjamin Bedoussac
- Studio: ADK Creative One
- Original network: TV Osaka
- Original run: July 13, 2019 – September 28, 2019
- Episodes: 12

Madoromi Barmaid (まどろみバーメイド, Madoromi Bāmeido; lit. "Sleepy Barmaid") is a Japanese manga series written and illustrated by Pao Hayakawa. It began serialization in Houbunsha's Weekly Manga Times magazine in March 2017. A live-action television drama adaptation aired from July to September 2019.

== Synopsis ==
The series is centered around three barmaids who live under the same roof: Yuki Tsukikawa, who runs the elusive food stall bar "Satellite" that randomly appears in Tokyo, Ibuki Kiho, who works at the long-established five-star hotel "Elysion Hotel Tokyo", and Hinozaki Hiyoko, who entertains customers with her flair bartending skills at the bar "Stream" in Koenji.

== Media ==
=== Manga ===
Written and illustrated by Pao Hayakawa, Sleepy Barmaid began serialization in Houbunsha's Weekly Manga Times magazine on March 10, 2017. Its chapters have been collected into nineteen tankōbon volumes as of June 2026.

No.	Release date	ISBN
1	July 14, 2017	978-4-8322-3556-4
2	December 15, 2017	978-4-8322-3586-1
3	July 13, 2018	978-4-8322-3618-9
4	December 14, 2018	978-4-8322-3649-3
5	June 13, 2019	978-4-8322-3679-0
6	December 16, 2019	978-4-8322-3706-3
7	June 16, 2020	978-4-8322-3747-6
8	December 16, 2020	978-4-8322-3789-6
9	June 16, 2021	978-4-8322-3833-6
10	December 16, 2021	978-4-8322-3878-7
11	June 16, 2022	978-4-8322-3920-3
12	December 15, 2022	978-4-8322-3960-9
13	June 15, 2023	978-4-8322-0302-0
14	December 14, 2023	978-4-8322-0351-8
15	June 14, 2024	978-4-8322-0409-6
16	December 16, 2024	978-4-8322-0464-5
17	June 13, 2025	978-4-8322-0516-1
18	December 12, 2025	978-4-8322-0572-7
19	June 12, 2026	978-4-8322-0626-7
20	December 14, 2026	978-4-8322-0677-9

=== Drama ===
A 12-episode Japanese television drama adaptation produced by ADK Creative One aired on TV Osaka from July 13 to September 28, 2019. The drama starred Mai Kiryū, Hyunri, and Alissa Yagi in lead roles.
