= Manga Home =

Japanese manga magazine

- Cover of September 2008 issue.
- Categories: Seinen manga
- Frequency: Monthly
- First issue: December 1987
- Company: Houbunsha
- Country: Japan
- Based in: Tokyo
- Language: Japanese
- Website: Official site

Manga Home (まんがホーム, Manga Hōmu) is a Japanese monthly seinen manga magazine published by Hōbunsha since December 1987. The magazine is released monthly on the 2nd. Manga Home is printed as B5 size. The magazine is known for having inspirational and family-themed messages on the edges of the pages, and many of the manga focus on husbands and wives, families, and related topics.

During the last several years, while sister magazine Manga Time Kirara has become the most popular of the Manga Time magazine family, Manga Home (along with Manga Time) has retained a fairly conservative style and focus which has allowed it to remain popular.

From December 1988 through July 1997, the magazine ran a "New Female Yonkoma Manga Artist" series which introduced a number of new artists such as Megumi Nanzawa, Chinatsu Tomobiki, Nobara Nonaka, Niniko Nitta, Moeko Narita, Yukari Tominaga, Aoi Morimura, Maya Koikeda, and Ryōji Sekine.

== Currently serialized works ==
Listed alphabetically.

- An'yo (Yumiko Akiyoshi, since July 2007)
- Chima-sanchi no Kobako (Emi Fukasaka, since May 2008)
- Faminyu? (Shō Yumemakura, since December 2007)
- Instant Angel Tenko-sama ga Kuru! (Tomoko Andō)
- Mama wa Idol (Naokazu Yanagita, since September 2005)
- Raika Days (Munko, since September 2003)
- Sakuranbo. (Nozomi Yoshihara, September 2006 - October 2007, November 2008, January 2009 - current)
- Tentama. (Akihiro Toyoda, since February 2007)
- Tonari no Nanige-san (Shiu Tachibana, since July 2008)
- Yes Master! (Mikan Matsumoto, May - July 2008, September 2008 - current)
- Yomeken (Hohetomaru, since August 2006)

== Previously serialized works ==
Listed in order of appearance.

- Bokunchi no Idol Hiromi-chan (Wakako Nariyuki, 1987–2002)
- Ōi Hachibe (Uko Ukai, 1987–2002)
- Okiraku Mama (Tomoko Nitta, 1999–2002)
- Suki da yon Tā-kun (Chinatsu Tomobiki, 1990–1995)
- Okaeri Mā-san (Maya Koikeda, 1991–1998)
- Uchi no Hahaoya Matta Nashi (Yumiko Akiyoshi, 1995–2007)
- Shima Shima Hamster (Kaoru Yukawa, 1998–2000)
- Pretty Mama ga Rival! (Mikiko Yoshida, 1999–2006)
- Boku no Kanojo wa Waitress (Naoki Shigeno, 2000–2004)
- Aoki Iin e Ikō! (Takeshi Ōsawa, 2002–2004)
- Tanin Donburi (Komaki Jinsenji, 2002–2006)
- Onegai Asakura-san (Uina Kinomoto, 2002-?)
- Akarui Fūfu Keikaku (Tomoko Inoue, 2002–2003)
- Daijōbu Desu! Success-sha (Naokazu Yanagida, 2003–2005)
- Hidamari Kazoku (Hohetomaru, 2003–2006)
- Mio Nikki (Cherry Arai, 2004–2006)
- Love Lab (Ruri Miyahara, 2006-?) (Moved to Manga Time Special)
- Gomen Asobase (Megumi Tanzawa, 1994–2007)
- Hiibaa Chachacha! (Junko Kubota, 2006–2007)
- C Q Q (Naoki Mita, 2007–2008)
- Chima Cherry (Meme Sakanaya, 2007–2008)
- High Five (Yukari Yagi, 2007–2008)
- Kururin! (Mikan Matsumoto, 2007–2008)
- Aiken Ume no Hana (Minami Hiroko, ?-2008)
- Furusato no Shiki (Makoto Sano, ? - 2008)
- Mononofu Kotohajime (Arashi Shindō, 2007–2009)
- Hanatama (Haruka Ogataya, 2007–2010)
- Ōedo Tote Shan (Akiko Morishima, 2007–2010)
- Marchen Tōsan (Mikiko Yoshida, 2006–2012)
- Fūfu na Seikatsu (Rui Ōhashi, 1999–2012)
- Ichibanboshi no Soba de (Hiroko Sengoku, 2012–2013)
