= Dokudami Tenement =

Japanese manga series

- Genre: Comedy, slice of life
- Manga
- Written by: Takashi Fukutani
- Published by: Houbunsha; Seirinkogeisha
- English publisher: Black Hook Press
- Magazine: Weekly Manga Times
- Original run: May 18, 1979 – April 7, 1993
- Volumes: 35

Dokudami Tenement (独身アパートどくだみ荘, Dokushin Apāto Dokudami-Sō; "Dokudami Singles Apartment") is a Japanese gekiga manga series written and illustrated by Takashi Fukutani.

== Description ==
Initially serialized in Japanese in the pages of Weekly Manga Times from May 18, 1979, until April 2, 1993, the work was hugely popular and subsequently collected into 35 volumes by the Japanese publisher Houbunsha. Total sales of Dokudami Tenement are recorded at 5 million copies. The series is currently out of print, but e-book volumes have been published.

Set in Tokyo during the 1980s, the work explores and deals with many subcultures and social issues that were prominent at the time, such as Japanese traditional customs, yakuza, recreational drug use, drug addicts, infidelity, fetishism, alcoholism, poverty, and isolation. Takashi Fukutani stated a number of times that the stories, characters and settings in Dokudami Tenement are semi-autobiographical and are based on his own life experiences during his time in the towns of Asagaya, and Koenji (both located in Suginami-ku, West Tokyo).

The series depicts the highs and lows a young man named Yoshio who is employed as a day labourer in civil construction sites during the Japanese asset price bubble period.

Dokudami is the Japanese name for Houttuynia cordata, a flowering plant native to Japan. It is often considered a weed and grows in damp and shady places. 'Doku' is also the word for poison in Japanese.

== Characters ==
Hori Yoshio, "Yoshio" (ほり ヨシオ)
The main protagonist of Dokudami Tenement is Yoshio, a 24-year-old man born in Saidaiji, Okayama prefecture. He moved to Tokyo, bringing his guitar, in search of the bohemian lifestyle, and settled in Asagaya, West Tokyo. Within one year he has sold his guitar and has become a day labourer on civll construction projects. With no guarantee of constant work the only accommodation available to him is the cheapest type of accommodation, without bathroom, air-conditioning, and bath, and with only a shared toilet and a shared kitchen "Dokudami-so". Yoshio, due to his young age and positive childlike enthusiastic demeanor, often finds himself in encounters with pretty young woman, and other interesting individuals. Yoshi's hobby is binge drinking, and when drunk he often falls to the roadside.
Hori Miyuki (ほり ミユキ)
Yoshio's sister.
Daisuke Ruta (ろくた だいすけ)
A Resident of Dokudomiso, he is a cartoonist who struggles to sell his comics for a living.
Aussie Hiromi (ごう ひろみ)
A Resident of Dokudami Tenement.

== Film ==
A film based on the manga was released on December 24, 1988. It was directed by Abe Hisaka, with the original screenplay written by Takashi Fukutani. The film was converted into VHS in 1989, but it has not been released on DVD or as a digital download.
