= Takashi Fukutani =

Japanese manga artist

- 福谷たかし
- Born: February 4, 1952; Okayama, Okayama, Japan
- Died: September 9, 2000 (aged 48); Tokyo, Japan
- Occupation: Manga artist
- Years active: 1978–2000
- Employer(s): Houbunsha, Kodansha
- Notable work: Dokudami Tenement

Takashi Fukutani (福谷たかし; February 4, 1952 – September 9, 2000) was a Japanese manga artist. He is best known for his manga series Dokudami Tenement.

== Early life and career ==
Fukutani was born in the Saidaiji area of Okayama and was raised by his father, a strict military veteran, after his parents divorced. His father died when he was 15, and he lived an unhappy life with his stepmother. By the age of 16 he was placed on juvenile probation following arrests for drug use and other petty crime. Upon turning 18, he went in search of his birth mother, and eventually settled in Tokyo.

After a series of low-paying jobs, Fukutani applied for a position as an assistant to Yukichi Yamamatsu (jp). Fukutani's drunkenness interfered with his work, and he was fired on his first day. Inspired by the experience, however, he began creating manga based on his experiences and in 1978 Fukutani was awarded an honorable mention in a contest run by Dakkusu manga magazine for his story Tokyo Adieu.

== Dokudami Tenement ==
In 1979 he used his experiences about his near destitute life, living and drinking in the Asagaya and Koenji districts while working as a day laborer on construction sites as inspiration for his manga. His first published work was the story Bohemian Rhapsody in the Weekly Manga Goraku in 1979.

He took some of his stories to the publishing company Houbunsha, owners of the magazine Weekly Manga Times who began to serialize the stories as Dokudami Tenement. Fukutani depicted life at the margins of Japan's largely middle-class society, among social groups rarely shown in the media, but necessary for the economic boom then occurring. The popular series ran for 14 years, and was adapted as a live action movie in 1988, three volumes of original video animation in 1989 and two direct-to-video movies in 1995.

As the series gained popularity, Fukutani developed a public reputation as a hard-drinking bohemian, with fans bringing gifts of alcohol and cigarettes to his public appearances. This image was reinforced by a notorious appearance on the late-night talk show 11PM (jp), where he shocked producers by drinking excessively throughout the program.

== Later career and death ==
Fukutani eventually tired of writing Dokudami Tenement, and after missing several deadlines, he announced that he would end the series in 1993. His attempts to create new series, such as the Yakuza-themed RETAKE, met with little success. After strong pressure from fans and his publishers, he relaunched his best-known work as New Dokudami Tenement in 1994, continuing for only a few months. Throughout the 1990s he struggled with alcoholism, and was repeatedly hospitalized, before dying of pulmonary edema in 2000.

== Posthumous recognition ==
Despite his domestic success, Fukutani and his work were little-known outside of Japan until well after his death, when French and English translations of Dokudami Tenement were published. When his work was introduced to a new international audience, Fukutani began to receive critical attention beyond Japan.

In French, the first volume of Dokudami Tenement (published as Le Vagabond de Tokyo) was an official selection of the Angoulême International Comics Festival in 2010. The third volume in the same series was nominated for the ACBD's Prix Asie de la Critique in 2013. In English, the first translated volume of Dokudami Tenement was nominated for the 2017 Broken Frontier Award for "Best Collection of Classic Material".

Paul Gravett includes Fukutani in his list of the 1001 most important creators in worldwide comics history. He also included Dokudami Tenement (translated as The Tokyo Drifter) in 1001 Comics You Must Read Before You Die, his list of "the best or most significant works in the medium".

== Partial bibliography ==
- Dokudami Tenement (1979-1993, Weekly Manga Times)
- New Dokudami Tenement (1994, Weekly Manga Times)
- Don't Look Back, (1981, Weekly Young Magazine)
- Duck Tail Yuu 「Duck Tail遊」, (1982, Weekly Young Magazine)
- RETAKE 「リ・テ・イ・ク」, (1992, ACTION PIZAZZ)

== Exhibitions of work ==
- Asagaya Manga Chronicle: Takashi Fukutani, Gallery Hakusen, Tokyo, July 30 - August 8, 2014
- Dokudami Tenement, Orbital Comics Gallery, London, 1–14 August 2017
- Mangasia: Wonderlands of Asian Comics, (group show) Barbican BIE, Worldwide, Ongoing

== Related works ==
- Legend - The Definitive Dokudami Tenement (Seirinkogeisha, 1 volume)
