= List of manga magazines =

This is a list of notable manga magazines or manga anthologies (漫画雑誌, manga zasshi) published in Japan. The majority of manga magazines are categorized into one of five demographics, which correspond to the age and gender of their readership:

- Children – aimed at young children.
- Shōnen – aimed at boys.
- Shōjo – aimed at girls.
- Seinen – aimed at young adult men.
- Josei – aimed at young adult women.

Some entries are listed as "Mixed", indicating that they are aimed at an audience of both girls and boys. For magazines that do not correspond to one of the five demographics, their primary genre is listed.

== List ==
- Most recent issue published only online

Magazine name	Japanese name	Year of First Issue	Year of Last Issue	Demographic / Genre	Frequency	Publisher
4-Koma Nano Ace	4コマnanoエース	2011	2013	Shōnen/Seinen	Monthly	Kadokawa Shoten
Altima Ace	アルティマエース	2011	2012	Shōjo	Bi-monthly	Kadokawa Shoten
Aria	アリア	2010	2018	Shōjo/Josei	Monthly	Kodansha
Asuka Fantasy DX	月刊ASUKAファンタジーDX	1991	2000	Shōjo	Monthly	Kadokawa Shoten
Be x Boy Gold	Be x Boy Gold	1993		Josei	Bi-monthly	Libre
Be Love	ビー·ラブ	1980		Josei	Semi-monthly	Kodansha
Bessatsu CoroCoro Comic	別冊コロコロコミック	1977		Kodomo (male)	Monthly	Shogakukan
Bessatsu Hana to Yume	別冊花とゆめ	1977	2018	Shōjo	Monthly	Hakusensha
Bessatsu Margaret	別冊マーガレット	1964		Shōjo	Monthly	Shueisha
Bessatsu Shōnen Magazine	別冊少年マガジン	2009		Shōnen	Monthly	Kodansha
Betsucomi (formerly Bessatsu Shōjo Comic)	ベツコミ (formerly 別冊少女コミック)	1970		Shōjo	Monthly	Shogakukan
Big Comic Original	ビッグコミックオリジナル	1972		Seinen	Semi-monthly	Shogakukan
Big Comic Superior	ビッグコミックスペリオール	1987		Seinen	Semi-monthly	Shogakukan
Bōken Ō	冒険王	1949	1983	Shōnen	monthly	Akita Shoten
Bouquet	ぶ〜け	1978	2000	Shōjo	monthly	Shueisha
Boy's Life	ボーイズライフ	1963	1969	Shōnen	Monthly	Shogakukan
Josei	Irregular	Seisensha				
Champion Red	チャンピオンレッド	2002		Shōnen	Monthly	Akita Shoten
Chara	Charaの本棚	1994		Shōjo	Bi-monthly	Tokuma Shoten
Charano!	キャラの!	2006	2013	Male	Bi-monthly	Hobby Japan
Cheese!	チーズ!	1996		Shōjo	Monthly	Shogakukan
ChuChu	ちゅちゅ	2005	2009	Shōjo	Monthly	Shogakukan
Ciao (formerly Weekly Shōjo Ciao)	ちゃお (formerly 週刊少女コミックちゃお)	1976		Shōjo	Monthly	Shogakukan
Cocohana (formerly Chorus)	コーラス	1994		Josei	Monthly	Shueisha
COM	コム	1967	1972	Shōnen	Monthly	Osamu Tezuka
Comi Digi +	隔月コミデジ+	2006	2008	Seinen	Bi-monthly	Flex Comix
Comic Beam	コミックビーム	1995		Seinen	Monthly	Enterbrain
Comic Birz	月刊コミックバーズ	1996	2018	Seinen	Monthly	Gentosha
Comic Blade Brownie	コミックブレイドブラウニー	2008	2009	Shōnen/Shōjo	Issued once	Mag Garden
Comic Blade Masamune	コミックブレイドマサムネ	2002	2007	Shōnen	Bi-monthly	Mag Garden
Comic BomBom	コミックボンボン	1981	2007	Kodomo (male)	Monthly	Kodansha
Comic Earth Star	コミック アース・スター	2011	2014 (print version)	Shōnen	Monthly	Earth Star Entertainment
Comic Gum	コミックガム	1996	2015	Seinen	Monthly	Wani Books
Comic High!	コミック·ハイ!	2004	2015	Seinen	Monthly	Futabasha
Comic Kairakuten	COMIC快楽天	1994		Hentai	Monthly	Wanimagazine
Comic LO	成年コミックエルオー	2002		Lolicon (male)	Monthly	Akane Shinsha
Comic Rex	コミックレックス	2005		Shōnen	Monthly	Ichijinsha
Comic Rush	月刊コミックラッシュ	2004	2014	Shōnen	Monthly	Jive
Comic Sylph	シルフ	2006	2017 (print version)	Shōjo	Monthly	ASCII Media Works
Comic Valkyrie	コミックヴァルキリー	2006		Seinen	Bi-monthly	Kill Time Communication
Comic Yuri Hime	コミック百合姫	2005		Shōjo	Monthly	Ichijinsha
Comic Yuri Hime S	コミック百合姫S	2007	2010	Shōnen/Seinen	Quarterly	Ichijinsha
Comp Ace	コンプ エース	2005		Shōnen	Monthly	Kadokawa Shoten
Comptiq	コンプティーク	1983		Seinen	Monthly	Kadokawa Shoten
Cookie	クッキー	2000		Josei	Bi-monthly	Shueisha
CoroCoro Comic	月刊コロコロコミック	1977		Kodomo (male)	Monthly	Shogakukan
Craft	クラフト	1999		Yaoi	Semi-monthly	Taiyoh Tosho
Dengeki Comic Gao!	月刊電撃コミックガオ!	1992	2008	Shōnen	Monthly	MediaWorks
Dengeki Daioh	月刊コミック電撃大王	1994		Shōnen	Monthly	ASCII Media Works
Dengeki G's Comic	電撃G'sコミック	2014	2019 (print version)	Seinen	Monthly	ASCII Media Works
Dengeki G's Festival! Comic	電撃G's Festival! COMIC	2007	2010	Seinen	Irregular	ASCII Media Works
Dengeki G's Magazine	電撃G's magazine	1992		Seinen	Monthly	ASCII Media Works
Dengeki hp	電撃hp	1998	2007	Seinen	Bi-monthly	MediaWorks
Dengeki Kuro Maoh	電撃黒「マ)王	2007	2010	Seinen	Quarterly	ASCII Media Works
Dengeki Maoh	電撃「マ)王	2005		Seinen	Monthly	ASCII Media Works
Dengeki Moeoh	電撃萌王	2002		Seinen	Bi-monthly	ASCII Media Works
Dengeki Teioh	電撃帝王	2004	2006	Seinen	Quarterly	ASCII Media Works
Dessert	デザート	1996		Shōjo/Josei	Monthly	Kodansha
Dragon Age Pure	ドラゴンエイジピュア	2006	2009	Shōnen	Bi-monthly	Fujimi Shobo
Evening	イブニング	2001	2023	Seinen	Bi-weekly	Kodansha
Feel Young	フィール·ヤング	1989		Josei	Monthly	Shodensha
For Mrs.	フォアミセス	1986		Josei	Monthly	Akita Shoten
Gangan Powered	ガンガンパワード	2001	2009	Shōnen	Monthly	Square Enix
Garo	ガロ	1964	2002	Mixed	Monthly	Katsuichi Nagai
Gessan (also referred to as Monthly Shōnen Sunday)	ゲッサン	2009		Shōnen	Monthly	Shogakukan
GFantasy	月刊Gファンタジー	1993		Mixed	Monthly	Square Enix
Good! Afternoon	good!アフタヌーン	2008		Seinen	Monthly	Kodansha
Grand Jump	グランドジャンプ	2011		Seinen	Semi-monthly	Shueisha
Gundam Ace	ガンダムエース	2001		Seinen	Monthly	Kadokawa Shoten
Hana to Yume	花とゆめ	1974		Shōjo	Semi-monthly	Hakusensha
Jossie	ジョシィ	1998	1998	Josei	Irregular	Hakusensha
Jump Square	ジャンプスクエア	2007		Shōnen	Monthly	Shueisha
June	コミックJUNE	1978	2004	Yaoi	Bi-monthly	Magazine Magazine (formerly Sun Publishing Co.)
Kerokero Ace	ケロケロエース	2007	2013	Shōnen	Monthly	Kadokawa Shoten
Kiss	キス	2007		Josei	Monthly	Kodansha
LaLa	ララ	1976		Shōjo	Monthly	Hakusensha
LaLa DX	ララ デラックス	1983		Shōjo	Bi-monthly	Hakusensha
Lemon People	レモンピープル	1981	1998	Hentai (adult men)	Monthly	Kubo Shoten
Josei	Bi-monthly	Shusuisha				
Lupin III Official Magazine	ルパン三世officialマガジン	2004		Seinen	Quarterly	Futabasha
Magazine Be × Boy	B-Boy	1993		Josei	Monthly	Libre
Magazine Special	少年マガジンSPECIAL	1983	2017	Shōnen	Monthly	Kodansha
Magi-Cu	マジキュー	2001	2007	Shōnen/Seinen	Monthly	Enterbrain
Manga 4-koma Kings Palette	まんが4コマKINGSぱれっと	2006		Seinen	Monthly	Ichijinsha
Manga Action (formerly Weekly Manga Action)	週刊漫画アクション	1967		Seinen	Bi-weekly	Futabasha
Manga Burikko	漫画ブリッコ	1982	1986	Lolicon (male)	Monthly	Serufu Shuppan
Manga Erotics F	マンガ·エロティクス·エフ	2001	2014	Mixed	Bi-monthly	Ohta Publishing
Manga Home	まんがホーム	1987		Seinen	Monthly	Houbunsha
Manga Life	まんがライフ	1984		Seinen	Monthly	Takeshobo
Manga Shōnen	漫画少年	1947	1954	Shōnen	monthly	Asahi Sonorama
Manga Time	まんがタイム	1981		Seinen	Monthly	Houbunsha
Manga Time Jumbo	まんがタイムジャンボ	1995		Seinen	Monthly	Houbunsha
Manga Time Kirara	まんがタイムきらら	2002		Seinen	Monthly	Houbunsha
Manga Time Kirara Carat	まんがタイムきららCarat	2003		Seinen	Monthly	Houbunsha
Manga Time Kirara Forward	まんがタイムきららフォワード	2006		Seinen	Monthly	Houbunsha
Manga Time Kirara Max	まんがタイムきららMAX	2004		Seinen	Monthly	Houbunsha
Manga Time Original	まんがタイムオリジナル	1982		Seinen	Monthly	Houbunsha
Margaret	マーガレット	1963		Shōjo	Semi-monthly	Shueisha
Megami Magazine	メガミマガジン	1999		Seinen	Monthly	Gakken
Melody	メロディ	1997		Josei	Bi-monthly	Hakusensha
Mimi	ミミ	1975	1996	Shōjo	Monthly / Semimonthly	Kodansha
Monthly Action	月刊アクション	2013		Seinen	Monthly	Futabasha
Monthly Afternoon	アフタヌーン	1986		Seinen	Monthly	Kodansha
Monthly Asuka	月刊あすか	1985		Shōjo	Monthly	Kadokawa Shoten
Monthly Big Comic Spirits	月刊!スピリッツ	2009		Seinen	Monthly	Shogakukan
Monthly Comic @Bunch (formerly Weekly Comic Bunch)	月刊コミック@バンチ	2011		Seinen	Monthly	Shinchosha
Monthly Comic Alive	月刊コミックアライブ	2006		Seinen	Monthly	Media Factory
Monthly Comic Avarus (formerly Monthly Comic Blade Avarus)	月刊コミックアヴァルス (formerly 月刊コミックブレイドアヴァルス)	2007		Shōjo	Monthly	Mag Garden
Monthly Comic Blade	月刊コミックブレイド	2002		Shōnen	Irregular	Mag Garden
Monthly Comic Dragon	月刊コミックドラゴン	1992	2003	Shōnen	Monthly	Fujimi Shobo
Monthly Comic Flapper	コミックフラッパー	1999		Seinen	Monthly	Media Factory
Monthly Comic Garden	月刊コミックガーデン	2014		Shōnen/Shōjo	Monthly	Mag Garden
Monthly Comic Gene	月刊コミックジーン	2011		Shōjo	Monthly	Media Factory
Monthly Comic Ryū	月刊COMICリュウ	1979		Seinen	Monthly	Tokuma Shoten
Monthly Comic Zenon	月刊コミックゼノン	2010		Seinen	Monthly	Tokuma Shoten
Monthly Comic Zero Sum	月刊コミックZERO-SUM	2002		Josei	Monthly	Ichijinsha
Monthly Dragon Age (formerly Monthly Comic Dragon)	月刊ドラゴンエイジ	2003		Shōnen	Monthly	Fujimi Shobo
Monthly Dragon Magazine	ドラゴンマガジン	1988	2025	Shōnen	Bi-monthly	Fujimi Shobo
Monthly Gangan Joker	月刊ガンガンJOKER	2009		Shōnen	Monthly	Square Enix
Monthly Gangan Wing	月刊ガンガンWING	1996	2009	Shōnen	Monthly	Square Enix
Monthly Halloween	月刊ハロウィン	1985	1995	Shōjo	Monthly	Asahi Sonorama
Monthly Ikki	月刊IKKI	2003	2014	Seinen	Monthly	Shogakukan
Monthly Magazine Z	月刊マガジンZ	1999	2009	Seinen	Monthly	Kodansha
Monthly Shōnen Champion (formerly Bessatsu Shōnen Champion)	月刊少年チャンピオン	1970		Shōnen	Monthly	Akita Shoten
Monthly Shōnen Gangan	月刊少年ガンガン	1991		Shōnen	Monthly	Square Enix
Monthly Shōnen Jump (formerly Bessatsu Shōnen Jump)	月刊少年ジャンプ (formerly 別冊少年ジャンプ)	1970	2007	Shōnen	Monthly	Shueisha
Monthly Shōnen Magazine (formerly Bessatsu Shōnen Magazine)	月刊少年マガジン (formerly 別冊少年マガジン)	1964		Shōnen	Monthly	Kodansha
Monthly Shōnen Sirius	月刊少年シリウス	2005		Shōnen	Monthly	Kodansha
Monthly Sunday Gene-X	月刊サンデーGENE-X	2000		Seinen	Monthly	Shogakukan
Morning 2	モーニング·ツー	2006		Seinen	Monthly	Kodansha
Nakayoshi	なかよし	1955		Shōjo	Monthly	Kodansha
Newtype	ニュータイプ	1985		Mixed	Monthly	Kadokawa Shoten
Oh Super Jump	オースーパージャンプ	2005	2011	Seinen	Monthly	Shueisha
Opera	オペラ	2005		Yaoi	Quarterly	Akane Shinsha
Petit Comic	プチコミック	1977		Josei	Monthly	Shogakukan
Premiere Cheese	プレミアCheese!	2016		Shōjo	Bi-monthly	Shogakukan
Princess	プリンセス	1975		Shōjo	Monthly	Akita Shoten
Princess Gold	プリンセスGOLD	1979	2020	Shōjo	Semi-monthly	Akita Shoten
Pucchigumi	ぷっちぐみ	2006		Kodomo (female)	Monthly	Shogakukan
Ribon	りぼん	1955		Shōjo	Monthly	Shueisha
Ribon Original	りぼんオリジナル	1981	2006	Shōjo	Bi-monthly	Shueisha
Saikyō Jump	最強ジャンプ	2010		Shōnen	Bi-monthly	Shueisha
Sho-Comi (formerly Shōjo Comic)	少コミ (formerly 少女コミック)	1968		Shōjo	Semi-monthly	Shogakukan
Shōjo Friend	少女フレンド	1962	1996	Shōjo	Monthly	Kodansha
Shōnen Ai no Bigaku	少年愛の美学	2003	2008	Shotacon (male)	Irregular	Shobukan
Shōnen Ace	月刊少年エース	1994		Shōnen	Monthly	Kadokawa Shoten
Shōnen Big Comic (formerly Weekly Shōnen Big Comic & Manga-kun)	少年ビッグコミック (formerly 週刊少年ビッグコミック and マンガくん)	1976	1987	Shōnen	Bi-weekly	Shogakukan
Shōnen Book	少年ブック	1958	1969	Shōnen	Monthly	Shueisha
Shōnen Rival	月刊少年ライバル	2008	2014	Shōnen	Monthly	Kodansha
Shōnen Sekai	少年世界	1895	1914	Shōnen	Monthly	Hakubunkan
Shōnen Sunday Super (formerly Shōnen Sunday Zokan)	少年サンデー超 (formerly 週刊少年サンデー増刊号)	1978		Shōnen	Monthly	Shogakukan
Super Jump	スーパージャンプ	1986	2011	Seinen	Bi-weekly	Shueisha
Televi-Kun	てれびくん	1976		Kodomo (male)	Monthly	Shogakukan
The Hana to Yume	ザ花とゆめ	1999		Shōjo	Bi-monthly	Hakusensha
Tsubomi	つぼみ	2009	2012	Yuri	Quarterly/Bi-monthly	Houbunsha
Ultra Jump	ウルトラ ジャンプ	1999		Seinen	Monthly	Shueisha
V Jump	ブイジャンプ	1993		Shōnen	Monthly	Shueisha
Weekly Comic Bunch	週刊コミックバンチ	2001	2010	Seinen	Weekly	Coamix/Shinchosha
Weekly Manga Goraku	週刊漫画ゴラク	1968		Seinen	Weekly	Nihon Bungeisha
Weekly Manga Sunday	週刊漫画サンデー	1959	2013	Seinen	Weekly	Jitsugyo no Nihon Sha
Weekly Manga Times	週刊漫画TIMES	1956		Seinen	Weekly	Houbunsha
Weekly Morning (formerly Comic Morning)	週刊モーニング (formerly コミックモーニング)	1982		Seinen	Weekly	Kodansha
Weekly Shōnen Champion	週刊少年チャンピオン	1969		Shōnen	Weekly	Akita Shoten
Weekly Shōnen Jump (formerly Shōnen Jump)	週刊少年ジャンプ (formerly 少年ジャンプ)	1968		Shōnen	Weekly	Shueisha
Weekly Shōnen Magazine	週刊少年マガジン	1959		Shōnen	Weekly	Kodansha
Weekly Shōnen Sunday	週刊少年サンデー	1959		Shōnen	Weekly	Shogakukan
Weekly Young Jump	週刊ヤングジャンプ	1979		Seinen	Weekly	Shueisha
Weekly Young Sunday	週刊ヤングサンデー	1987	2008	Seinen	Weekly	Shogakukan
Wings	月刊ウィングス	1982		Shōjo	Monthly	Shinshokan
You	ユー	1982	2018	Josei	Semi-monthly	Shueisha
Young Ace	ヤングエース	2009	2022	Seinen	Monthly	Kadokawa Shoten
Young Animal (formerly Animal House)	ヤングアニマル (formerly アニマルハウス)	1989		Seinen	Bi-weekly	Hakusensha
Young Animal Arashi	ヤングアニマル嵐	2000		Seinen	Monthly	Hakusensha
Young Champion	ヤングチャンピオン	1988		Seinen	Semi-monthly	Akita Shoten
Young Comic	ヤングコミック	1967		Seinen	Monthly	Shōnen Gahōsha
Young Gangan	ヤングガンガン	2004		Seinen	Semi-monthly	Square Enix
Young King	ヤングキング	1987		Seinen	Bi-weekly	Shōnen Gahōsha
Young King OURs	ヤングキングアワーズ	1993		Seinen	Monthly	Shōnen Gahōsha
Young Magazine	週刊ヤングマガジン	1980		Seinen	Weekly	Kodansha
Young Magazine Uppers	ヤングマガジンアッパーズ	1998	2004	Seinen	Semi-monthly	Kodansha
Young You	ヤングユー	1986	2005	Josei	Monthly	Shueisha
Yuri Shimai	百合姉妹	2003	2004	Yuri	Quarterly	Sun Magazine
Monthly Big Gangan (ex zoukan young gangan)	増刊ヤングガンガン	2011		Seinen	Monthly	Square Enix

The following have full details on the magazine entry:

Magazine name	Japanese name	Cover date of First Issue	Cover date of Last Issue	Demographic	Frequency	Publisher
Bessatsu Friend (formerly Bessatsu Shoujo Friend)	別冊フレンド (別冊少女フレンド)	1965		Shōjo	Monthly	Kodansha
Bessatsu Friend (formerly Bessatsu Shoujo Friend)	Originally published as Bessatsu Shoujo Friend between 1965 until December 1984.					
Big Comic	ビッグコミック	1968		Seinen	Semi-monthly	Shogakukan
Big Comic	Originally published monthly, the magazine changed format to semi monthly from April 1969.					
Big Comic Spirits	ビッグコミックスピリッツ	November 15, 1980		Seinen	Weekly	Shogakukan
Big Comic Spirits	Started as monthly magazine in November 1980 and changed to Bi-Weekly on July 30, 1981. became a weekly magazine in April 1986					
Business Jump	ビジネスジャンプ	July 1985	November 2, 2011	Seinen	Bi-weekly	Shueisha
Business Jump	Began as a monthly magazine until March 1986 when it changed to bi weekly. It was finally closed alongside Super Jump and was succeeded by Grand Jump.					
Champion Red Ichigo	チャンピオンレッドいちご	2006	2014	Seinen	Bi-monthly	Akita Shoten
Champion Red Ichigo	Red Ichigo was a series of special editions of Champion Red that was aimed at Seinen readership. The series lasted until 2014 when it was discontinued.					
Monthly Flowers (formerly Petit Flower)	月刊flowers (プチフラワー)	May 1, 1980		Josei	Monthly	Shogakukan
Monthly Flowers (formerly Petit Flower)	Published quarterly from launch until November 1981. Relaunched as bimonthly January 1982 and then monthly from March 1984. Renamed to Monthly Flowers in June 2002.					

== See also ==
- List of Japanese manga magazines by circulation
- List of manga magazines published outside of Japan
