= Asagaya =

Residential area of ward in Suginami-ku, Tokyo, Japan

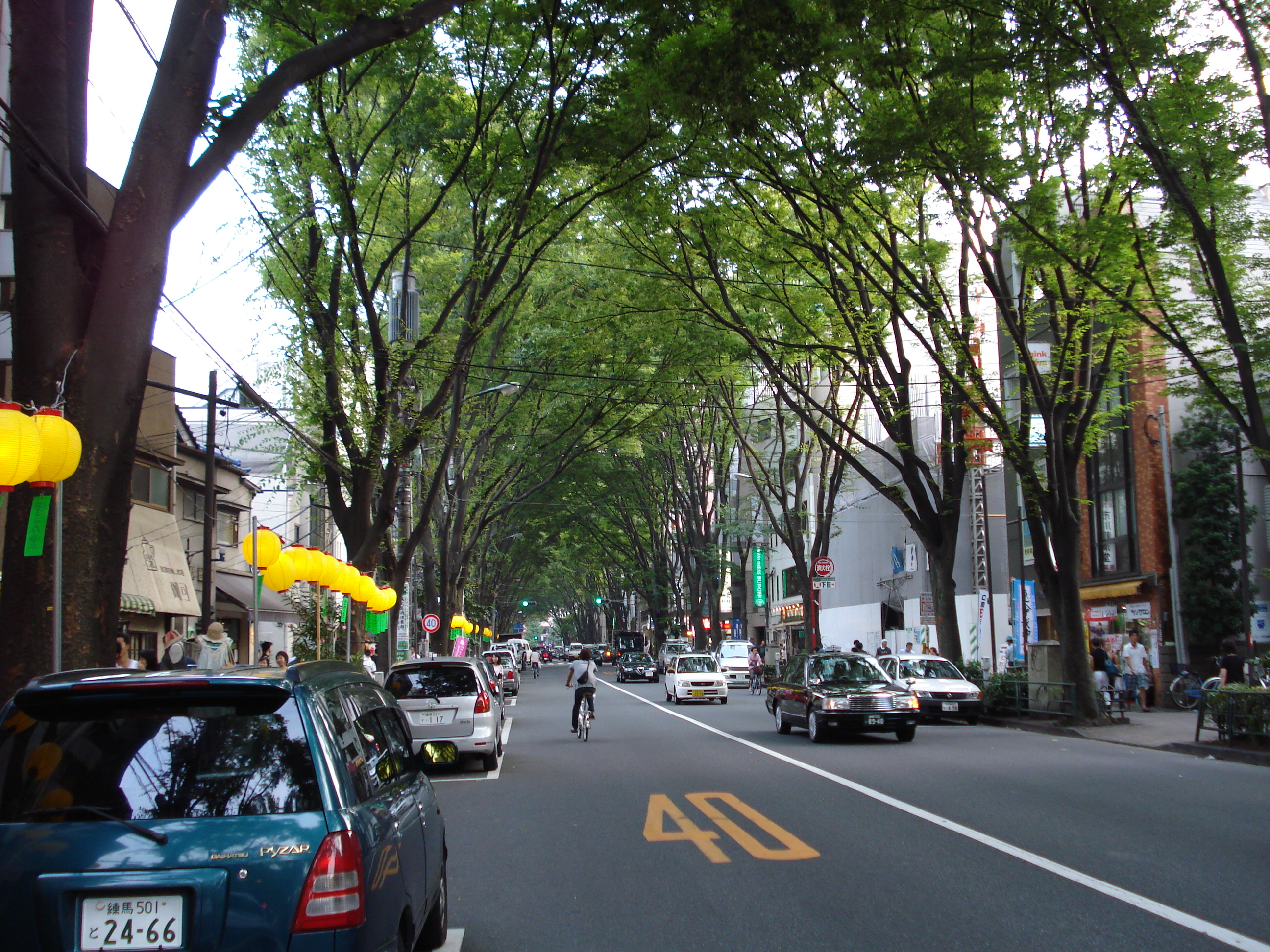

Asagaya (阿佐ヶ谷) is a residential area of Tokyo located in Suginami ward (one of the 23 wards or boroughs of Tokyo) west of Shinjuku. Main access to Asagaya is via the Chūō-Sōbu Line, 12 minutes by train from Shinjuku station.

== Geography ==
At present the Asagaya area is divided latitudinally into North (阿佐ヶ谷北; Asagaya-kita) and South (阿佐谷南; Asagaya-Minami) by the Chūō-Sōbu Line. Boundaries for this area are roughly the same as those for Asagaya Village (阿佐ヶ谷村, Asagaya-mura), dating back to the Edo Period. Longitudinally, the Japanese Zelkova serrata tree-lined boulevard, Nakasugi-dōri (中杉通り), divides Asagaya, running from Ome-kaido in the south to Waseda-dōri in the north. From around the Taishō period people began moving from the Yamanote area (central Tokyo) into the suburbs including Asagaya. At present, the area around the station is considered upper-level Tokyo suburban housing due to its space, greenery, convenience to central Tokyo—and numerous Shōtengai, the largest of which originates from the South exit of Asagaya Station.

Asagaya is accessible by train, subway, and bus. The ward office is located directly above the Minami-Asagaya station.

== Transportation ==
- JR East Asagaya Station (Chūō-Sōbu Line) 35°42′18″N 139°38′08″E
- Tokyo Metro Minami-Asagaya Station (Tokyo Metro Marunouchi Line) 35°41′58″N 139°38′08″E

== History ==
The origin of the area name "Asagaya" comes from the shallow valley (浅い谷地) of the Momozono River (桃園川). Later it was ruled by a family known as the Asagaya clan (阿佐ヶ谷氏) and thus known as Asagaya Village (阿佐ヶ谷村).

In 1921 a stop was created on the Sōbū streetcar line running on Ome-kaido from Shinjuku to Ogikubo, which later became the Tōden Suginami (都電杉並線) streetcar line, then the present subway Marunouchi Line. Service on the Tōden Suginami streetcar ended in 1961. Asagaya Station was built and added to the Kōbu railway line (built 1884; Kōbu-tetsudo (甲武鉄道) in 1924, which later became the Chūō Main Line.

After the exodus from central Tokyo following the Kantō Earthquake of 1923, Asagaya became the home to a literature community beginning with Ibuse Masuji, and eventually including Yosano Akiko, Dazai Osamu, Aoyagi Mizuho, Ima Harube, Miyoshi Tatsuji, Hino Ashihei, and Tokugawa Musei. Because of this history Asagaya is also known as "Literary Town Asagaya".

== Entertainment ==
=== Theater, film, and music ===
Asagaya is home to three theater spaces, Hitsuji-za, Theater Shine, and Zamuza, located about the revival movie house Laputa, which specializes in 1950–1970s Japanese film. It is also home to the anime studio A-1 Pictures.

Along the bar streets that run to the west of the JR Asagaya Station on the north and south sides are a number of tiny music venues, mostly jazz and folk oriented. A number of bars that offer jazz, blues, and rock also pepper the western bar area.

=== Shopping ===
The covered shopping street (shōtengai) Pearl Center, located on the south side of JR Asagaya station, is the largest in the area, though, smaller uncovered shōtengai also run to the north of the station. While Koenji to the east is known for its used clothing stores, most of the goods available are oriented toward household needs, though on the north side a number of used book and manga stores also do business.

=== Eating and drinking ===
On the lively street, Star Road (スターロード) originating from the northeast side of the JR Asagaya station, there are a number of tiny, intimate eateries, however while some places are renowned for their food, the size and number of these dens makes for an adventure.

On the southwest side of the station on Kawabata Street (かわばた通り), a number of bars and yakitori places abound, and other grilled delights abound.

=== Festivals ===
Asagaya has two large festivals each year. The Tanabata (七夕祭り) is held annually during the first week of August. The Tanabata festival is known for its assortment of hanging papier-mâché characters that adorn the Pearl Road.

Asagaya is also known for its jazz festival, Asagaya Jazz Streets, held over the last weekend in October. This jazz festival is one of the largest in the city with musicians playing an assortment of venues.

== In popular culture ==
Asagaya appears in the films Ring, Ring 2, Death Note, New Game! and Yellow Tears.

It is the setting for the long-running manga series Dokudami Tenement by Takashi Fukutani, its film and anime adaptations, and also for the 15th Manga Taishō nominée Hirayasumi by Keigo Shinzō.
