= Manga Time Jumbo =

Japanese manga magazine

- Cover of August 2008 issue.
- Categories: Seinen manga
- Frequency: Monthly
- First issue: April 1995
- Final issue: April 2018
- Company: Hōbunsha
- Country: Japan
- Based in: Tokyo
- Language: Japanese
- Website: Official site

Manga Time Jumbo (まんがタイムジャンボ, Manga Taimu Janbo) was a Japanese monthly yonkoma seinen manga magazine published by Hōbunsha from April 1995 to April 2018. The magazine was published in the 1990s as Manga Time Zōkan. Before the May 2005 issue, the magazine was released on the 12th day of the month, but changed to releasing monthly on the 4th. Manga Time Jumbo was printed as B5 size.

From February 1992 through October 2000, a "New Yonkoma Artist Panel" was convened. Every month, two to three works by newcomers would be included in the magazine, and readers would vote on them by sending in their opinions on a reply card. The winners of the contests would have their works serialized. Winners during this period include Ryōji Sekine, Poisson d'Avril, Takeshi Ōsawa, Shōko Fujita, Uina Kinomoto, Tōko Shiwasu, Kyūten Yuminaga, Nantoka, Tomoko Inoue, Shihori Watanabe, Eiji Ide, and Hairan.

Manga Time Jumbo had a "renewal" of sorts when it picked up series dropped by Manga Time Pop when it ceased publication in December 2003. The magazine's main draw, however, is due to its serialization of new works.

== Serialized works ==
Listed alphabetically.

- Akarui Fūfu Keikaku (Tomoko Inoue, April 2001 - February 2006, currently on hiatus)
- Aoi-chan to Yamato-kun (Tōko Shiwasu, since July 2001)
- Atsumu Toy Town (Masahito Mizuki, since December 2008)
- Boku no Shachōsama (Hiroshi Aro, since March 2004)
- Boy's Time (Kaoru Fujinagi, since September 2004)
- Damasarete Miko (Pārin Sanada, since June 2006)
- Gochamaze My Sister (Shihori Watanabe, since December 2003)
- Happy Come Come (Atsuko Katagiri, since September 2005)
- Himajin (Naoki Shigeno, since August 2000)
- Kibun wa Jōjō (Mairu Nanao, since April 2004)
- Ko Usagi Tsukikoyomi (Nantoka, since July 2007)
- Master Dog (Takashi Miyasaka, since May 2008)
- Onegai Asakura-san (Uina Kinomoto, since January 2001)
- Pâtissière! (Miyu Nohiro, since June 2005, title changed to Double Pâtissière! in September 2008)
- Re-Kan! (Hinako Seta, from 2010 to 2018, moved to Manga Time)
- Rikatteba! (Suzu Hasegawa, since December 2002, story format (rather than yonkoma))
- Tabibito (Naoki Shigeno, December 2003 - September 2004, currently on hiatus)
- Tadaima Benkyōchū (Tōko Tsuji, since January 2007)
- Tenshi na Koakuma (Nozomi Yoshihara, since July 2005)

== Previously serialized works ==
Listed in order of appearance.

- Okaeri Mā-san (Maya Koikeda, 1991–1998)
- Haruna-chan Sanjō! (Yumiko Akiyoshi, 1995–2001)
- Bokunchi no Idol Hiromi-chan (Wakako Naruyuki, 1995–2003)
- Enjoi Akira-sensei (Masahito Mizuki, 1995–2008)
- Dangerous na Kanojo (Rui Ōhashi, 1996–1997)
- Fūfu na Seikatsu (Rui Ōhashi, 1997–2004)
- Ashita no Atashi (Megumi Tanzawa, 1998–2002)
- Tadaima Kinmuchū (Tōko Tsuji, 1999–2003)
- Takuhaibin Dēsu! (Shōko Fujita, 1999–2003)
- Miura-ke no Nichijō (Takeshi Ōsawa, 1999–2004)
- Sausage March (Ryōji Sekine, 1999–2004)
- Shinshaku Fantasy Emaki (Nantoka, 2000–2007)
- Double Star (Kaoru Yukawa, 2001–2003)
- Café de Aimashō (Kahiro Okuya, 2001–2004)
- Tanin Donburi (Komaki Jinzenji, 2001–2004)
- Uchi no Hahaoya Mattanashi (Yumiko Akiyoshi, 2001–2005)
- Nanami Masshigura (Takashi Miyasaka, 2001–2008)
- Mama wa Trouble Hyōjun Sōbi (Hairan, 2002–2003)
- Sayurin (Kyūten Yuminaga, 2002–2007)
- Otona Desu yo? (Shihori Watanabe, 2003)
- Nijiiro Uranaishi (Tōko Tsuji, 2004–2005)
- Marin Karin (Misuzu Katagiri, 2004–2006)
- Hana to Oyogu (Gurigura Kuchihacchō, 2004–2008)
- More Better Friends (Tōko Tsuji, 2005–2006)
- Inaka no Gakkō (Akiko Kurikawa, 2006–2007)
