= Ooya-san wa Shishunki! =

Japanese four-panel manga and anime series

- The cover of the first volume.

大家さんは思春期！ (Ōya-san wa Shishunki!)
- Genre: Comedy, slice of life
- Manga
- Written by: Rurū Minase
- Published by: Houbunsha
- Magazine: Manga Time; Manga Time Family
- Original run: 2012 – present
- Volumes: 21
- Anime television series
- Directed by: Yuki Ogawa
- Produced by: Kazuaki Morijiri; Tadakazu Hiraga
- Written by: Nana Akutsu
- Music by: Arte Refact
- Studio: Seven Arcs Pictures
- Licensed by: NA: Crunchyroll
- Original network: Tokyo MX, Sun TV
- Original run: January 10, 2016 – March 27, 2016
- Episodes: 12

Ooya-san wa Shishunki! (大家さんは思春期！, Ōya-san wa Shishunki!; lit. "The Landlord is in Puberty") is a Japanese four-panel manga series written and illustrated by Rurū Minase. A 12-episode anime television series adaptation by Seven Arcs Pictures aired from January 10 to March 27, 2016.

== Plot ==
A young man, Maeda, moves into a new apartment, only to find that his new landlady, Chie, is a middle schooler.

== Characters ==
=== Residents of the apartment ===
Chie Satonaka (里中チエ, Satonaka Chie)
Voiced by: Yurika Kubo
Maeda (前田)
Voiced by: Takashi Kondō
Reiko Shirai (白井 麗子, Shirai Reiko)
Voiced by: Hitomi Nabatame

=== Chie's friends ===
Mayu Ueno (植野 真由, Ueno Mayu)
Voiced by: Ibuki Kido
Yuki Miyamura (宮村 雪, Miyamura Yuki)
Voiced by: Erii Yamazaki
Asuka Mori (森 明日香, Mori Asuka)
Voiced by: Yuki Nakashima
Sakura Kanemoto (金本 さくら, Kanemoto Sakura)
Voiced by: Kyouko Wada

=== Chie's classmate ===
Kengo Sasaki (佐々木 健吾, Sasaki Kengo)
Voiced by: Sanae Kobayashi

== Media ==
=== Manga ===
Rurū Minase began publishing the series in Houbunsha's Manga Time magazine in 2012. The manga is also serialized in the publisher's Manga Time Family magazine, starting in January 2014. The series has been collected into twenty-one tankōbon volumes.

==== Volumes ====
No.	Japanese release date	Japanese ISBN
1	7 October 2013	978-4-8322-5235-6
2	6 March 2014	978-4-8322-5272-1
3	7 August 2014	978-4-8322-5311-7
4	7 May 2015	978-4-8322-5381-0
5	7 January 2016	978-4-8322-5448-0
6	7 September 2016	978-4-8322-5513-5
7	6 May 2017	978-4-8322-5586-9
8	7 November 2017	978-4-8322-5638-5
9	7 August 2018	978-4-8322-5706-1
10	7 March 2019	978-4-8322-5744-3
11	7 October 2019	978-4-8322-5765-8
12	4 June 2020	978-4-8322-5792-4
13	6 November 2020	978-4-8322-5809-9
14	5 August 2021	978-4-8322-5836-5
15	7 June 2022	978-4-8322-5869-3
16	7 February 2023	978-4-8322-5891-4
17	7 November 2023	978-4-8322-5919-5
18	6 August 2024	978-4-8322-5948-5
19	6 March 2025	978-4-8322-5970-6
20	7 January 2026	978-4-8322-1012-7
21	7 September 2026	978-4-8322-1045-5

=== Anime ===
An anime adaptation was announced on 17 September 2015, and aired on TV in January 2016. The anime was directed by Yuki Ogawa, with animation by the animation studio Seven Arcs Pictures. Character designs were produced by Atsuki Shimizu, who also served as animation director. The series' music is composed by Arte Refact and produced by King Records and bilibili. It aired on Tokyo MX and Sun TV between 10 January 2016 to 27 March 2016. The series was simulcast worldwide on Crunchyroll.

==== Episode list ====
No.	Title	Original release date
1	"The Landlord is a Little Girl!" "Ōya-san wa Onna no Ko!" (大家さんは女の子！)	10 January 2016
2	"The Landlord is Domesticated!" "Ōya-san wa Kateiteki!" (大家さんは家庭的！)	17 January 2016
3	"The Landlord is Oblivious?" "Ōya-san wa Mujikaku?" (大家さんは無自覚？)	24 January 2016
4	"The Landlord is Neighborly" "Ōya-san wa Sewayaki!" (大家さんは世話焼き！)	31 January 2016
5	"The Landlord Likes to be Alone?" "Ōya-san wa Hitori Suki?" (大家さんはひとり好き？)	7 February 2016
6	"The Landlord is the Center of Attention!" "Ōya-san wa Chūmoku no Mato!" (大家さんは注目の的！)	14 February 2016
7	"The Landlord is a Chef!" "Ōya-san wa Ryōrijin!" (大家さんは料理人！)	21 February 2016
Note: Shuri, Megumi, Masako and Kuro from Komori-san wa Kotowarenai make a cameo appearance.
8	"The Landlord goes to the Public Baths!" "Ōya-san wa Sentō-gayoi!" (大家さんは銭湯通い！)	28 February 2016
9	"The Landlord is an Oddball?" "Ōya-san wa Kawarimono?" (大家さんは変わり者？)	6 March 2016
10	"The Landlord is Growing?" "Ōya-san wa Seichō-chū?" (大家さんは成長中？)	13 March 2016
11	"The Landlord has a Good Eye!" "Ōya-san wa Omegatakai!" (大家さんはお目が高い！)	20 March 2016
12	"The Landlord is Just So...!" "Ōya-san wa Yappari... !" (大家さんはやっぱり... ！)	27 March 2016
