= Maya Koikeda =

Japanese manga artist

Maya Koikeda (小池田 マヤ, Koikeda Maya; born May 4, 1969 in Hikari, Yamaguchi, Japan) is the pen name of a Japanese manga artist. Her real name is Keiko Yamada (山田 佳子, Yamada Keiko), and her pen name was created by saying backward the syllables from her real name. Koikeda graduated with a degree in art from the Kyoto City University of Arts. In addition to her work in manga, she is a part-time lecturer at a vocational school.

Koikeda won the first Hairdressing Scissors-chan Grand Prize presented by the Japan National Hairdressing Trade Association for her manga Barber Harbor.

== Works ==
- Okaeri Mā-san (1991-1998, 3 volumes, Manga Home, Manga Time, Manga Time Jumbo, Hōbunsha)
- Boku no Kawaii Jōshi-sama (1995-1999, 4 volumes, Hōbunsha, also published as 2 volume kanzenban by Futabasha)
- Urara kana Hibi (1997, 1 volume, Hōbunsha)
- Super Tumtum (1997-1998, 3 volumes, Hōbunsha, also published as 1 volume wideban by Kodansha)
- Reiko ga Iku! (1998-1999, 2 volumes, Hōbunsha)
- Tokimeki Makkun! (1996-1999, 3 volumes, Hōbunsha)
- Saint Kōkōsei (1998-2007 (currently on hiatus), 9 volumes (as of January 2009), Shōnengahosha
- Batsuichi 30ans (1999-2000, 2 volumes, Takeshobō)
- ...Sugi na Revolution (1999-2003, 8 volumes (republished as 3 volumes), Kodansha)
- My Pace! Yuzuran (1999-2004, 5 volumes, Futabasha)
- Aoi-sama ga Suki (2000, published in the same volume as Hinotama Love, Futabasha)
- Barber Harbor (2001-2005, 7 volumes, Kodansha)
- Ichigo Office (2002, 4 volumes, Daitosha)
- CGH! Cactus, Go to Heaven! (2005-2008, 5 volumes, Shodensha)
- Hinotama Love (2006-2007, 1 volume, Manga Action, Futabasha)
- Umeboshi (2006-2008, 2 volumes, Young Gangan, Square Enix)
- Barber Harbor NG (2007, 1 volume, Kodansha)
- Mermaid Blues (2007, 1 volume, Takeshobō)
- Fushigi-kun Jam (2008-current, 1 volume as of January 2009, Futabasha)
- TOMOS! Cole train no isan (2011-current, 2 volumes as of February 2011, Futabasha)
