= Rei Hanagata =

Japanese manga artist

- Born: Tokyo, Japan
- Occupations: Manga artist Screenwriter
- Years active: 2005–present
- Known for: China Girl; Barista; Aji Ichi Monme

Rei Hanagata (花形怜, Hanagata Rei) is a Japanese manga artist and a manga script writer especially well known in the gourmet manga field. Almost of his works are written about people involved in food industries, such as a coffee shop owner, a cheese shop owner, a Barista, a hamburger shop owner, or a traditional Japanese cuisine chef (Itamae).

== Career ==
In 2005 he started his manga writing career when he wrote the script of Cafe Dream, drawn by Osamu Hiramatsu, in Weekly Manga Times published by Houbunsha. Afterward he has written a lot of books for some Japanese big publishing companies such as Shogakukan, Nihon Bungeisha, Shueisha, Kodansha and so on.
His books are translated and published in Asian and European countries include France, Belgium, Taiwan, China, South Korea, Indonesia, Thailand etc.
In 2014 he also started his career as a Screenwriter when he wrote the script of an action movie whose title is Ankoku no tatakai(Battle in the darkness), directed by Takayuki Yamaga.

== Works ==
=== Manga ===
- Coffee Dream (2005, 5 volumes, art by Osamu Hiramatsu)
- Cheese no Jikan (2009, 5 volumes, art by Yoshinobu Yamaguchi)
- China Girl (2009, 1 volumes, art by Kei Aoyama)
- Don na Mondai! (2010, 2 volumes, art by Kanji Yoshikai)
- Barista (manga) (2010, 10 volumes, art by Kumi Muronaga)
- Onmitsu Boucho ~Honjitsu mo Urei Nashi~ (2015, 4 volumes, art by Kei Honjou)
- Today's Burger (2020, 18 volumes, art by Umetaro Saitani)
- Aji Ichi Monme - Sekai no Naka no Washoku (2017, 2 volumes, art by Yoshimi Kurata)
- Le Chocolatier Sadique (2020, 2 volumes, art by Kyuujo Matsumoto)
- Pasta no Ryuugi (2022, 3 volumes, art by Umetaro Saitani)

=== Film ===
- Ankoku no Tatakai (Battle in the Darkness) (2014, directed by Takayuki Yamaga)
- Koroshi no Gundan Pt. 1 (2015, directed by Yoshihisa Yamamoto)
- Koroshi no Gundan Pt. 2 (2015, directed by Yoshihisa Yamamoto)
- Charisma Yakuza (2017, directed by Masahiro Asao)
