= Love Lab =

Japanese manga series

- Cover of the first manga volume featuring Riko Kurahashi (left) and Natsuo Maki (right)

恋愛ラボ (Rabu Rabo)
- Genre: Romantic comedy, slice of life
- Manga
- Written by: Ruri Miyahara
- Published by: Houbunsha
- Imprint: Manga Time Comics
- Magazine: Manga Home → Manga Time Special
- Original run: 2006 – 2019
- Volumes: 15
- Anime television series
- Directed by: Masahiko Ohta
- Produced by: Yosuke Toba; Tsuguharu Sakurai; Hiromasa Minami; Tetsuya Endo; Kozue Kaneniwa; Hajime Kamata; Hiroo Maruyama
- Written by: Takashi Aoshima
- Music by: Yasuhiro Misawa
- Studio: Doga Kobo
- Licensed by: NA: Sentai Filmworks
- Original network: MBS, TBS, CBC, AT-X, BS-TBS, Niconico
- Original run: July 5, 2013 – September 27, 2013
- Episodes: 13
- icon

Love Lab (恋愛ラボ（ラブラボ）, Rabu Rabo) is a Japanese four-panel manga series written and illustrated by Ruri Miyahara. An anime adaptation by Doga Kobo aired in Japan from July to September 2013.

== Plot ==
Love Lab is set in Fujisaki Girls Academy, which is known for their school body being composed of very proper students. The most prominent one of them is Natsuo Maki, the student president who is admired by her classmates for her calm and polite demeanor. On the other hand, Riko Kurahashi is also admired but for having a very forward and boyish personality. Riko accidentally walks into Maki when she is kissing a body pillow with a picture of a guy for practice, and learns that she is not as collected as everyone thinks she is. Riko is forced into keeping Maki's secret and joins her in practicing romance activities such as holding hands and more.

== Characters ==
=== Main characters ===
Riko Kurahashi (倉橋 莉子, Kurahashi Riko)
Voiced by: Rie Kugimiya (drama CD) / Manami Numakura (anime)
Riko (リコ) is a popular girl who has a very forward and boyish personality. She joins the student council as an aide to president Maki after she is recruited for her perceived romance experience, even though she possesses little practical experience in love. She is known in her school as the "Wild Kid" (ワイルドの君, Wairudo no Kimi), a title which dismays her. However, even though she has a boyish personality, she secretly wishes that she could have a cuter nickname instead of "Wild Kid" and wants to have a cuter approach but has a trouble doing so due to how embarrassed she gets every time she tries to do something girlish. Riko can't stand handsome gentlemen like guys. Later in the manga, she realizes that she has feelings for Nagi.
Natsuo Maki (真木 夏緒, Maki Natsuo)
Voiced by: Yui Horie (drama CD) / Chinatsu Akasaki (anime)
The student council president, Maki (マキ) has a polite and calm demeanor. She is admired by the majority of students in their academy. Despite her reputation as a model student, in truth, Maki aims to learn about romance. Her devotion to this can lead to extremities to the point where she owns a hug pillow named "Huggy" (ダッキー, Dakkī), which she sometimes uses as practice for kissing. Another fact is that, despite her vast intelligence and rumored "perfection," whenever she is alone with Riko, she appears to have almost no common sense or perception of tact, almost to the point where one might think she's actually an airhead. Her lack of logic is especially prominent when it comes to the topic of romance that she loves so much; not only that, her perception of an ideal romance appears to mainly consist of common anime tropes, even down to having extremely melodramatic dialogue and bumping into someone while carrying bread in her mouth. Her father owns a famous undergarments manufacturer. She cross-dresses herself (Makio) sometimes to help Riko. She always finds herself having misunderstandings with Yan.
Suzune Tanahashi (棚橋 鈴音, Tanahashi Suzune)
Voiced by: Ryōko Shintani (drama CD) / Inori Minase (anime)
Suzu (スズ) is a petite and shy girl who serves as the student council's secretary. Inside their council office, she is usually in charge in making slapsticks that other members uses to punish fellow members as well. She has an older brother and sister who dote on her.
Yuiko Enomoto (榎本 結子, Enomoto Yuiko)
Voiced by: Ryō Hirohashi (drama CD) / Ayane Sakura (anime)
Eno (エノ) is a rich girl with thick eyebrows; she serves as the student council vice-president. Formerly the Student Council President, she resigns due to Maki not relying on her but is later reinstated as vice-president. She and Sayori are close friends. Eno also has a brother who is rather unstable and proclaims himself as a masochist, much to Eno's dismay. Eno finds herself falling in love with Minami Middle School's president Toda Haruka.
Sayori Mizushima (水嶋 沙依理, Mizushima Sayori)
Voiced by: Akeno Watanabe (drama CD) / Yō Taichi (anime)
Sayo (サヨ) wears glasses and is the student council treasurer. Infamously known to be somewhat wicked and a miser, Sayo actually has a boyfriend who lives in the neighboring district. Due to her greed over the Student Council's budget, Sayo is fired from the council by Maki, but is later reinstated along with Eno. She is also vice president of the literature club.

=== Supporting characters ===
Mika Kiriyama (桐山 美花, Kiriyama Mika)
Voiced by: Ayaka Suwa
Mika (ミカ) is Riko's friend and classmate.
Satoshi Nagino (凪野 智史, Nagino Satoshi)
Voiced by: Takahiro Mizushima
Nagi (ナギ) is Riko's childhood friend and former football teammate. He had a very feminine appearance when he was younger, which caused Riko to not initially recognize him. During grade school he asked out Riko, but he was rejected, although Riko does not remember this event and Nagi hopes she never does. Nagi hates being called cute and whacks Riko on the head every time she calls him cute, likewise Riko does the same to him when he refers to her as a boy. In the manga, he mistakes Makio for Riko's boyfriend who is in fact Maki cross-dressing. There are hints in the manga that may show that he actually still has feelings for Riko.
Masaomi Ikezawa (池澤 雅臣, Ikezawa Masaomi)
Voiced by: Yoshitsugu Matsuoka
Yan (ヤン) is a friend of Nagi. Yan was the vice-president of Minami Middle School's Student Council. He is constantly getting into conflict and misunderstandings with Maki.
Momoka Minami (南 桃香, Minami Momoka)
Voiced by: Chuna
Momo (モモ) is a member of the Newspaper Club. While Nana is in charge for the photos, Momo handles in article writing.
Nana Ichikawa (市川 奈々, Ichikawa Nana)
Voiced by: Rina Hidaka
Nana (ナナ) is another member of the Newspaper Club. She is clumsy and has a fear of heights, however, she is skilled with handling a camera; Suzu notes she takes good pictures.
Yumiko Kurahashi (倉橋 由美子, Kurahashi Yumiko)
Voiced by: Yoshiko Kamei
Riko's mother.
Rentarō Kurahashi (倉橋 蓮太郎, Kurahashi Rentarō)
Voiced by: Yuka Terasaki
Ren (レン) is Riko's younger brother. He is popular among girls. He also seems to have a crush on Maki.
Yū Yamazaki (山崎 佑, Yamazaki Yū)
Voiced by: Ayumu Murase
Yū (ユウ) is Sayori's boyfriend. In their elementary days, he first viewed Sayori as somewhat weird yet resolvable. After an accident while cleaning the floors, Yū started to hold feelings for Sayori.
Ms. Katsuragi (葛城 先生, Katsuragi-sensei)
Voiced by: Ikuko Tatsu
An elder looking school teacher at Fujisaki Academy. She often wears a long black dress with a white turtleneck blouse underneath.

== Media ==
=== Manga ===
The series has been released in fifteen tankōbon volumes.

The fifteenth and final volume was released on January 7, 2020.

No.	Release date	ISBN
1	March 7, 2008	978-4-8322-6619-3
2	January 7, 2009	978-4-8322-6706-0
3	July 7, 2009	978-4-8322-6757-2
4	December 26, 2009	978-4-8322-6807-4
5	November 6, 2010	978-4-8322-6904-0
6	October 7, 2011	978-4-8322-5008-6
7	November 22, 2012	978-4-8322-5134-2
8	July 5, 2013	978-4-8322-5202-8
9	September 6, 2013	978-4-8322-5221-9
10	September 6, 2014	978-4-8322-5318-6
11	August 7, 2015	978-4-8322-5407-7
12	November 7, 2016	978-4-8322-5531-9
13	September 7, 2017	978-4-8322-5621-7
14	November 7, 2018	978-4-8322-5727-6
15	January 7, 2020	978-4-8322-5776-4

=== Anime ===
An anime television series adaptation aired in Japan on MBS from July 5 to September 27, 2013. The series was animated by Doga Kobo, produced by Aniplex and directed by Masahiko Ohta, with series composition by Takashi Aoshima, original character designs by Chiaki Nakajima and music by Yasuhiro Misawa. The series was streamed on Niconico, after premiering on July 14, 2013, and on Crunchyroll, starting with the 9th episode on August 30, 2013. Sentai Filmworks licensed the series for release in North America.

The opening and ending themes are "Love Shitai—!" (恋愛(ラブ)したいっ!) and "Best Friends", both by the lead cast: Manami Numakura, Chinatsu Akasaki, Inori Minase, Ayane Sakura, and Yō Taichi.

== Reception ==
Carl Kimlinger of Anime News Network gave Love Lab an overall B− grade. He wrote that the series works better as a straightforward comedy when director Masahiko Ohta has the cast delivering slapstick humor than emotional moments throughout the three storylines that each carry a weighty dramatic ending like Kotoura-san, concluding that: "Even weighted down, though, this is a very funny comedy: easy to get into and easy to enjoy. It just isn't quite so easy to love." Tim Jones and Stig Høgset of THEM Anime Reviews praised the series' ongoing and complete plot, its main cast being "a fun bunch" (highlighting Sayo and her "hilarious deadpan, genre-savvy wit") and having "an equal amount of respect" towards both genders, concluding that: "It drags a bit at the end, but overall Love Lab is one of the funniest, quirkiest entries in the now well-tread high school girl comedy anime genre we've seen in a good while."

== See also ==
- The Kawai Complex Guide to Manors and Hostel Behavior, another manga series by Ruri Miyahara.
