= Manga Time =

Japanese manga magazine

- Cover of September 2008 issue
- Categories: Seinen manga
- Frequency: Monthly
- First issue: June 1981
- Company: Hōbunsha
- Country: Japan
- Based in: Tokyo
- Language: Japanese
- Website: Official site

Manga Time (まんがタイム, Manga Taimu) is a Japanese monthly yonkoma seinen manga magazine published by Hōbunsha since June 1981. The magazine is released monthly on the seventh. Manga Home is printed as B5 size. The magazine is sometimes referred to as simply Time (タイム, Taimu). It was created in 1981 by spinning off from Japan's first weekly manga magazine, Weekly Manga Times, creating Japan's first yonkoma manga magazine. Its 300th issue was published in 2005, and its longest running series, Otoboke Kachō reached its 300th chapter in March 2006.

Manga Time is the flagship title for Hōbunsha, and has spun off a series of related magazines including Manga Home, Manga Time Jumbo, Manga Time Kirara, Manga Time Lovely, Manga Time Family, Manga Time Kirara Max, Manga Time Special, Manga Time Original, and Manga Time Kirara Carat. All of these manga magazines are marketed as a "poor man's" comic, with a low price point and availability at locations such as convenience stores and train stations.

In addition to the magazines listed above, Manga Time also releases a monthly Manga Time Collection which contains works by only one artist per issue.

== Currently serialized works ==
Listed alphabetically by title.

- Doki Doki Tutorial (Rukapon, since August 2007)
- Hakoiri Ryōhin (Tomoko Inoue, since March 2005)
- Instant Angel Tenko-sama ga Kuru! (Tomoko Andō, since February 2005)
- Katsuage-kun (Hisashi Taira, formerly titled Sanchōme no Ankokugai)
- Love Jarashi! (Rieko Kawachi, since April 2007)
- Misorara (Ruri Miyahara, since August 2006)
- Neko Bukuro (Noriko Shimochi)
- Nippon no Waka Okusama (Kazuaki Kimura, since August 2006)
- Ohayo♪ (Tomochi, March–May 2006, September 2006 - current)
- Okan de Go!! (Shizuka Sada, since January 2006)
- Oshiete!! Ojii-chan (Yūko Satō, since January 2006)
- Otoboke Kachō (Masashi Ueda, since March 1981)
- Ooya-san wa Shishunki! (Rurū Minase, since 2012)
- Peach!! (Yoshio Kawashima, since March 2006)
- Puchi Tama (Riki Sodeyama, since July 2007)
- Radical Hospital (Ayu Hirano, since May 2006)
- Sensei no Suzume (Yōichirō Yui, since November 2007)
- Shuppatsu, Shingo!! (Mitsuo Hashimoto, created by Yūichirō Sueda, since June 2006)
- Sokonuke RPG (Ryōryō Satō, since January 2008)
- Sweet Room? (Meme Higashiya, since January 2007)
- Tama-san (Yukinatsu Mori, since November 2006)
- Tabibito (Naoki Shigeno, since June 2003)
- Tenshi-kun (Niniko Nitta)
- Ultra Kin-chan (Miyuki Sakamoto)

== Previously serialized works ==
Listed alphabetically by title.

- Anata ga Shuyaku ni Natta Toki (Hanako Matsuyama, 2004–2008)
- Asakaze-kun (Shō Tanaka)
- Assistant!! (Fumiwo Kagami, 2006–2010)
- Attaka Kazoku (Tatsuo Oda)
- Boku no Aisai Nikki (Hideharu Akaza)
- Boku wa Kōsuke-kun (Tōru Saiwai)
- Bokunchi no Hiromi-chan (Wakako Nariyuki)
- Chiaki Two-Face (Naokazu Yanagita, ?-2006)
- Chiisa na Koi no Monogatari (Chikako Mitsuhashi, 1983–1999)
- Choco Parfait (Izumi, 2003–2004)
- Datte Aishiteru (Munko, 2004–2007, 2008–2011)
- Fūfu na Seikatsu (Rui Ōhashi, 2005–2012)
- Fūka no Iru Fūkei (Masakazu Ōi, 2003–2005)
- Ganimata Keibu (Mitsuo Ozaki)
- Gaten no Kako-chan (Nobara Nonaka, ?-2004)
- Gohan Desu yo (Hiroshi Tanaka)
- Gomeiwaku Gals (Garu Okada, ?-2007)
- Harikiri Sayo-chan (Mariko Kubota)
- Hint de Mint! (Bomān, 2006–2009)
- Hiromi My Room (Mirika Sasai)
- Koi no Jikanwari (Emai Komotoda, 2003–2005)
- Koisuru Sayo-chan (Mariko Kubota)
- Madogiwa OL Tohoho na Asa Ufufu no Yoru (Nobu Ueda, created by Yuka Saitō, 2005–2007)
- Majokko @ Home (Tomomi Mizuna, 2003-?)
- Mukitamago Beauty (Haruka Fujino, ?-2004)
- My Pace! Tarako-san (Katsuhiko Hotta)
- Office no Aoisora (Hohetomaru, 2005–2006)
- Ofukuro-san (Masaharu Inoue)
- Ōi Hachibē (Uko Ukai)
- Okaeri Mā-san (Maya Koikeda, 1991–1998)
- Onegai Daisuke (Yoshimiiku, ?-2006)
- Oshigoto no Toriko (Ramune Suzuma, 2006–2007)
- Oyabaka Kobaka (Ken'ichi Kitami)
- Oyaji Café (Ken'ichi Kitami, created by Sumi Sawada, ?-2006)
- Papa x Mama Reversible (Akiko Morishima, ?-2006)
- Seishun Hakkyūkai (Tomoko Andō, ?-2004)
- Suzume-chan (Yoshirō Kamachi)
- Tennenshoku Girls (Junko Agi, ?-2004)
- Tonchi-kun (Masao Matsuda, ?-2007)
- Ukkari Tōsan (Hiroshi Suzuki)
- Watashi no Daiji na Danna-sama (Mayumi Wada, ?-2006)
- Yamahige-san (Sanpei Yamada)
- Yatai no Gensan (Noriko Kanagawa, ?-2007)
- Yuka Nisshi (Cherry Arai, 2004–2006)
