= Enomoto =

Enomoto (written: 榎本 or 永野元) is a Japanese surname. Notable people with the surname include:

- Aoi Enomoto (榎本 葵; born 1992), Japanese baseball player
- Atsuko Enomoto (榎本 温子; born 1979), Japanese voice actress and singer
- Chikatoshi Enomoto (榎本 千花俊; 1898–1973), Japanese painter
- Daiki Enomoto (榎本 大輝; born 1996), Japanese footballer
- Daisuke Enomoto (榎本 大輔; born 1971), Japanese business executive and space tourist
- Isami Enomoto (1929–2016), American ceramicist
- Jun Enomoto (榎本 潤; born 1977), Japanese footballer
- Kanako Enomoto (榎本 加奈子; born 1980), Japanese actress
- Kenichi Enomoto (榎本 健一; 1904–1970), Japanese comedian
- Kurumi Enomoto (榎本 くるみ; born 1981), Japanese singer-songwriter
- Nariko Enomoto (榎本 ナリコ; born 1967), Japanese manga artist
- Enomoto Seifu (榎本 星布; 1732–1815), Japanese poet
- Shinsaku Enomoto (榎本 新作; born 1998), Japanese basketball player
- Shunji Enomoto (榎本 俊二; born 1968), Japanese manga artist
- Enomoto Takeaki (榎本 武揚; 1836–1908), Admiral of the Imperial Japanese Navy
- Tatsuya Enomoto (榎本 達也; born 1979), Japanese footballer
- Tetsuya Enomoto (榎本 哲也; born 1983), Japanese footballer
- Yoshino Enomoto (永野元 佳乃; born 1998), Japanese ice hockey player

== Fictional characters ==
- Kei Enomoto (江ノ本 慧), a character in the manga series First Love Limited
- Yuiko Enomoto (榎本 結子), a character in the manga series Love Lab

== See also ==
- Enomoto: New Elements that Shake the World, a manga series by Shunji Enomoto
