= Monthly Ikki =

Japanese manga magazine

- Cover of the first issue of Monthly Ikki (cover dated April 2003)
- Editor: Hideki Egami
- Categories: Seinen manga
- Frequency: Monthly
- Circulation: 7,334 (July – September 2014)
- First issue: February 25, 2003
- Final issue: September 25, 2014
- Company: Shogakukan
- Country: Japan
- Language: Japanese
- Website: Official website

Monthly Ikki (Japanese: 月刊IKKI, Hepburn: Gekkan Ikki) was a monthly seinen manga magazine published by Shogakukan. Although it specialized in underground or alternative manga, it also had commercially successful series. The magazine started in 2000 as a spin-off to Shogakukan's Weekly Big Comic Spirits, titled Spirits Zōkan Ikki, published on a bimonthly basis, and became a standalone monthly magazine in 2003. In 2009, Viz Media launched an online English version of Monthly Ikki, named SigIkki, which serialized selected titles from the magazine. Ikki ceased publication after an almost 14-year-run in 2014, and was replaced by Hibana, which ran from 2015 to 2017, before ceasing its publication as well.

== History ==
First issue of Spirits Zōkan Ikki

Editor Hideki Egami, who spent 18 years in the editorial department of Shogakukan's Weekly Big Comic Spirits, observed the increasing sophistication of manga and believed some manga artists were better suited to monthly rather than weekly serialization. He noted that weekly series often required large teams of assistants and a fast-paced workflow, whereas monthly publication allowed creators like Taiyō Matsumoto (known for Tekkonkinkreet) to work more independently and deliberately. Egami credited Matsumoto with persuading him to develop a new magazine.

Egami conceived the magazine as a monthly spin-off of Weekly Big Comic Spirits. Naming the publication proved difficult due to trademark issues. After a rejected proposal to solicit names from readers, Egami and magazine designer Shin Sobue chose "Ikki" for its positive connotations, pleasing sound, and available copyright. (Note: The name "Ikki" carries multiple meanings: Hyakusho Ikki (百姓一揆): A peasant uprising, with "Ikki" implying unity or alliance.; Ikki Kassei (一気呵成): To complete a task in one effort; analogous to "Get it done!"; Ikki Uchi (一騎討ち): Single combat.; Ikki (イッキ): A drinking chant, similar to "Chug it!") The magazine launched as Spirits Zōkan Ikki (スピリッツ増刊IKKI, Supirittsu Zōkan Ikki), releasing 13 bimonthly issues from November 30, 2000, (Note: The first issue, cover-dated December 30, 2000, was released on November 30 of that year.) to December 25, 2002. It became a standalone monthly publication with its April 2003 issue, released February 25.

In 2009, Viz Media launched SigIkki, an English-language online version of Monthly Ikki. Egami acknowledged the defunct American magazine Pulp as a precursor that helped pave the way for Ikki's acceptance in the United States. With the magazine's original pages already digitized, Egami saw translation as an opportunity to reach a broader audience. The digital files, which separated text and art into layers, facilitated localization. Former Viz Media editorial manager Leyla Aker noted the project was internally nicknamed "Pulp 2.0" and shared the Viz Signature imprint's goal of publishing creatively excellent and diverse content. Monthly Ikki was also Shogakukan's first manga magazine to publish digitally. The SigIkki website serialized titles online, with popular series later receiving print publication, and featured interviews with creators and editors. In January 2013, the magazine's official site, Ikki Paradise, launched Web Ikipara Comic (WEBイキパラCOMIC), a free web manga corner serializing original online content.

After nearly 14 years, the September 2014 issue (released July 25) announced that Monthly Ikki would cease publication with the November issue (released September 25). Some series concluded in the final issue, while others transferred to different magazines. It was replaced by Hibana, (Note: ヒバナ, stylized as HiBaNa) which launched on March 6, 2015. Hibana itself ceased publication after two years, with its final issue released on August 7, 2017.

== Style ==
Well, not too long ago I was watched Shine a Light, and that reminded me of this quote of Keith's that I read about fifteen years ago. A reporter asked him something like, "What does it take to be like you?" Keith being Keith—that is, a much better talker than Mick—answered, "Stop trying to be like me." In other words, to be like Keith, you can't be like Keith. I want people out there to read IKKI in order to get inspired to create something brand new, not to become an IKKI look-alike. Be ready to make an entire genre yourself. Keep on digging underground to a whole new level even if you don't know what you'll find there.

— Hideki Egami

Monthly Ikki was regarded as an underground publication and was frequently compared to American and European alternative comics for its content. It has also been sometimes referred to as "Shogakukan's Afternoon" or "Shogakukan's Garo". The magazine prioritized authorial creativity over audience expectations. As Egami explained, his boss contrasted its approach with that of Weekly Big Comic Spirits: "for IKKI, you have to see the spring that is the origin of the river, meaning you have to see the creator and work with the creator; that it's important to understand the artists' point of view." This philosophy led the magazine to advertise itself as a "comics magazine" rather than a "manga magazine" to distinguish its unconventional content.

Its slogan, "[w]e are still at the dawn of the manga era," reflected an optimistic view of the medium's potential. Egami elaborated that this meant "if you assume that the history of manga will continue for 200 years or longer, we are still at the very beginning", suggesting ample room for innovation and growth beyond the perceived saturation of the market. He further expressed a belief in the future emergence of creators who could stand alongside Osamu Tezuka.

The magazine recruited artists both from other publications and through a newcomers contest. This initiative discovered talents such as Hisae Iwaoka, author of Saturn Apartments, and Shunju Aono, author of I'll Give It My All... Tomorrow.

== Circulation and demographic ==
Monthly Ikki's circulation experienced a gradual decline, from 33,916 copies in 2004 to 10,000 by 2013. Editor Hideki Egami acknowledged the magazine's limited commercial success in Japan. While anime adaptations of series like Bokurano: Ours and Rideback boosted their respective tankōbon sales, they had little effect on the magazine's overall circulation.

Although categorized as a seinen manga publication targeting older teens and adults, the magazine deliberately avoided focusing on a specific gender or age. Egami described its target audience as "everybody" with a creative mindset, and sought to stimulate "the highest sentiments that a person could feel." Its readership was primarily in their twenties, with a significant portion consisting of older teens and readers up to their fifties. Unusually for a seinen manga magazine, 40% of its readers were female, a figure that rose to 60% among its teenage audience. This broad appeal was partly facilitated by editorial choices, such as avoiding the use of nude photos on covers. Egami said that this was not necessarily because it would alienate female readers, but rather because it was not "that kind of nudity to begin with." Egami noted that the popularity of certain series with female readers, such as House of Five Leaves, occurred organically rather than by intentional design.

== Series featured in Ikki ==
=== Ongoing titles in the final issue ===
Series title	Author	Premiered	Notes
Afterschool Charisma (放課後のカリスマ, Hokago no Charisma)	Kumiko Suekane	April 2008	
Babel	Narumi Shigematsu	May 2012	Completed publication via compiled tankōbon volumes.
Dien Bien Phu (ディエンビエンフー, Dien Bien Fū) (Note: Stylized as Điện Biên Phủ)	Daisuke Nishijima	July 2006	Prototype version published in Kadokawa Shoten's Comic Shin Genjitsu from 2004 to 2005. Continued in Futabasha's Monthly Action as Dien Bien Phu: True End in 2017.
Dorohedoro (ドロヘドロ)	Q Hayashida	November 2000	Transferred to Hibana.
Futagashira (ふたがしら)	Natsume Ono	April 2011	Transferred to Hibana.
Golondrina (ゴロンドリーナ, Gorondorīna)	Est Em	June 2011	Completed publication via compiled tankōbon volumes.
Hakka Shōjo (薄花少女)	Yasuto Miura	December 2012	Transferred to Monthly Sunday Gene-X.
Ikki to Watashi (IKKIと私)	Shunju Aono	May 2014	
Kajiba no Baka IQ (火事場のバカIQ)	Shunji Enomoto	January 2013	Completed publication via compiled tankōbon volumes.
Kingyo Used Books (金魚屋古書店, Kingyoya Koshoten)	Seimu Yoshizaki	March 2004	Completed publication via compiled tankōbon volumes.
Kuma Fūfu (くま夫婦)	Yanboru Chūō	April 2009	
Levius	Haruhisa Nakata	December 2012	Continued with a sequel titled Levius/est in Shueisha's Ultra Jump.
Lotta Rain (ロッタレイン, Rotta Rein)	Tsuyoshi Matsumoto	April 2014	Transferred to Hibana.
Nekkoro (ネッコロ)	Isami Nakagawa	July 2013	Also published (and continued) in Shogakukan's Monthly Big Comic Spirits, Shōnen Sunday S and Pucchigumi.
Nōken (のうけん)	Ayumi Osada	December 2013	
Oni-san, Dochira (鬼さん、どちら)	Ine Arinaga	May 2014	Completed publication via compiled tankōbon volume.
Period	Sakumi Yoshino	June 2003	
Slapstick (スラップスティック, Surappusutikku)	Shunju Aono	November 2013	Transferred to Hibana.
Songbook	KNOTS	March 2014	
Sumire Fanfare (すみれファンファーレ, Sumire Fanfāre)	Naoko Matsushima	September 2011	Completed publication via compiled tankōbon volumes.
Sunny	Taiyō Matsumoto	December 2010	Transferred to Monthly Big Comic Spirits.

=== Previously serialized works ===
==== 2000–04 ====
- Anjū no Chi (安住の地) by Naoki Yamamoto (2000–2002)
- The Beetles (Note: Titled as Wāgen wo Dakishimetai (ワーゲンを抱きしめたい; "I Want to Hug the Volkswagen") in the collected volume.) by Atsushi Nobuzawa (original story) and Toshihiro Katagiri (art) (2000–2001)
- Fujisan (富士山) by Akira Sasō (2000–2001)
- G Senjō Heaven's Door (G戦場ヘヴンズドア, G Senjō Hevunzu Doa) by Yoko Nihonbashi (2000–2003)
- Guns & Blaze (ガンズ&ブレイズ, Ganzu & Bureizu) by Seiho Takizawa (2000–2002)
- Kagata no Suzu (永田のすず) by Ryo Nagata (2000–2002)
- Mahiru no Umi (まひるの海) by Sakuya Hikochi (2000–2002)
- Mangaka Chō Zankoku Monogatari (漫画家超残酷物語) by Nawoki Karasawa (2000–2003)
- No. 5 (ナンバーファイブ 吾, Nanbā Faibu) by Taiyō Matsumoto (2000–2005)
- Sexy Voice and Robo (セクシーボイスアンドロボ, Sekushī Boisu Ando Robo) by Iou Kuroda (2000–2002)
- Manga Sekuhara Senmon Gakkō (漫画セクハラ専門学校) by Nakatani D. (2001–2003)
- Freesia (フリージア, Furījia) by Jiro Matsumoto (2001–2009)
- Sukimasuki (スキマスキ) by Yumi Unita (2001–2003)
- Tetsuko no Tabi (鉄子の旅) by Hirohiko Yokomi (story) and Naoe Kikuchi (art) (2001–2006)
- Noramimi (のらみみ) by Kazuo Hara (2002–2009)
- Heibon Punch (平凡ポンチ, Heibon Ponchi) by George Asakura (2003–2005)
- Rideback by Tetsurō Kasahara (2003–2008)
- Witches (魔女, Majo) by Daisuke Igarashi (2003–2004)
- Maho Tsukai Mimicchi (まほおつかいミミッチ) by Hiroko Matsuda (2003–2006)
- Wild Mountain (ワイルドマウンテン, Wairudo Maunten) by Hideyasu Moto (2003–2009)
- Natsu no Kumo (ナツノクモ) by Rokuro Shinofusa (2003–2007)
- Bokurano: Ours (ぼくらの, Bokura no) by Mohiro Kitoh (2003–2009)
- Hakai: Uri Geller-san, Anata no Kao wa Iikagen Wasurete Shimaimashita (破戒 ~ユリ・ゲラーさん、あなたの顔はいいかげん忘れてしまいました~) by Suzuki Matsuo (story) and Naoki Yamamoto (art) (2004)
- Hana Boro (花ボーロ) by Hisae Iwaoka (2004–2005)
- Tsukidate no Satsujin (月館の殺人) by Yukito Ayatsuji (story) and Noriko Sasaki (art) (2004–2006)

==== 2005–09 ====
- Swweeet by Kei Aoyama (2005–2006)
- Children of the Sea (海獣の子供, Kaijū no Kodomo) by Daisuke Igarashi (2005–2011)
- Flying Girl (フライングガール, Furaingu Gāru) by Tetsu Kasabe (2005–2006)
- House of Five Leaves (さらい屋五葉, Sarai-ya Goyō) by Natsume Ono (2005–2010)
- Saturn Apartments (土星マンション, Dosei Mansion) by Hisae Iwaoka (2005–2011)
- Yomawari Sensei (夜回り先生) by Osamu Mizutani (original story) and Seiki Tsuchida (art) (2005–2009)
- Blanco (ブランコ, Buranco) by Wisut Ponnimit (2006–2010)
- Fruits (フルーツ, Furūtsu) by Kōichi Kiba (2006)
- I Love Biyori (あいらぶびより, Ai Rabu Biyori) by Kō Akita (2006–2009)
- Real World (リアルワールド, Riaru Wārudo) by Natsuo Kirino (original story) and Den Ishida (art) (2006–2007)
- I'll Give It My All... Tomorrow (俺はまだ本気出してないだけ, Ore wa Mada Honki Dashitenai Dake) by Shunju Aono (2007–2012)
- Saruman 2.0 (サルまん2.0) by Koji Aihara and Kentaro Takekuma (2007–2008)
- Ma Q Ken (魔Qケン乙) by Masahiko Kikuni (2008–2010) (moved from Weekly Young Sunday)
- Bob & His Funky Crew (ボブとゆかいな仲間たち, Bob to Yukaina Nakamatachi) by Puncho Kondoh (2009–2012)
- Sex Nanka Kyōminai (セックスなんか興味ない) by Nanki Satō (story) and Akira Kiduki (art) (2009–2012)
- Wombs by Yumiko Shirai (2009–2010) (continued publication via compiled tankōbon volumes)
- Shin Tetsuko no Tabi (新・鉄子の旅) by Hirohiko Yokomi (story) and Kanoko Hoashi (art) (2009–2013)
- Junkin' Gap Clash by Jinko Kobayashi (2009–2014)
- Takanashi-san (高梨さん) by Motoyuki Ōta (2009–2012)

==== 2010–14 ====
- Gunjō (羣青) by Ching Nakamura (2010–2012) (moved from Kodansha's Monthly Morning Two)
- Yorukumo (よるくも) by Michi Urushihara (2010–2014)
- I (アイ, Ai) by Mikio Igarashi (2010–2013)
- Nickelodeon (ニッケルオデオン, Nikkeruodeon) by Dowman Sayman (2010–2014)
- Jinrui wa Suitai Shimashita: Nonbirishita Hōkoku (人類は衰退しました のんびりした報告) by Romeo Tanaka (original story) and Takuya Mitomi (art) (2011–2012)
- Jinrui wa Suitai Shimashita: Nonbirishita Hōkoku 4-koma (人類は衰退しました のんびりした4コマ) by Romeo Tanaka (original story) and Takuya Mitomi (art) (2012)
- Watashi no Uchū (わたしの宇宙) by Ayako Noda (2012–2014)
- Ore wa Motto Honki Dashitenai Dake (俺はまだ本気出してないだけ) by Shunju Aono (2012–2013)
- Kūya Shōnin ga Ita by Taichi Yamada (original novel) and Hideki Arai (2013–14)

== Circulation figures ==
Year / Period	Monthly circulation	Magazine sales (est.)	Sales revenue (est.)	Issue price
September 2003 to August 2004	33,916	406,992	¥203,496,000	¥500
September 2004 to August 2005	29,000	348,000	¥174,000,000	¥500
September 2005 to August 2006	18,584	223,008	¥122,654,400	¥550
September 2006 to August 2007	16,000	192,000	¥105,600,000	¥550
October 2007 to September 2008	14,917	179,004	¥98,452,200	¥550
October 2008 to September 2009	13,750	165,000	¥107,250,000	¥650
October 2009 to September 2010	11,500	138,000	¥89,700,000	¥650
October 2010 to September 2011	11,000	132,000	¥72,600,000	¥550
October 2011 to September 2012	10,584	127,008	¥69,854,400	¥550
October 2012 to September 2013	10,000	120,000	¥66,000,000	¥550
September 2003 to September 2013	16,925	2,031,012	¥1,109,607,000	¥546
