= Voynich =

Voynich may refer to:

- Ethel Voynich (1864–1960), Irish novelist and musician, wife of Wilfrid
- Wilfrid Voynich (1865–1930), Polish revolutionary, discoverer of the Voynich manuscript, husband of Ethel
  - Voynich manuscript, a mysterious undeciphered document from the 15th century, named after its re-discoverer, Wilfrid Voynich
- The Voynich Hotel, a Japanese manga series
