= Levius =

Levius may refer to:

- The trade name for the drug known as aspirin
- Levius, a manga series created by Haruhisa Tanaka that was adapted into a Japanese anime series and released worldwide on Netflix on November 28, 2019
