= List of Hozuki's Coolheadedness chapters =

The chapters of the Japanese manga series Hozuki's Coolheadedness are written and illustrated by Natsumi Eguchi. They were serialized in Kodansha's magazine Weekly Morning between March 3, 2011, and January 9, 2020. Its 271 chapters have been collected into thirty-one tankōbon published between May 23, 2011, and September 23, 2020. An English-language digital edition is released by Kodansha Comics through its digital content distributor Kodansha Advanced Media. The first volume was released on March 21, 2017, while the tenth was made available on September 20, 2022.

A yonkoma (four-panel) spin-off by Monaka Shiba was published in Kodansha's Nakayoshi between December 1, 2015, and April 3, 2020; subtitled Shiro no Ashiato (シロの足跡; lit. 'Shiro's Footprints'), it focuses on Shiro. Its first tankōbon volume was released on November 22, 2016, while the fifth and last was released on September 23, 2020.

== Volume list ==
=== Hozuki's Coolheadedness ===
No.	Original release date	Original ISBN	English release date	English ISBN
1	May 23, 2011	978-4-06-387017-6	March 21, 2017	978-1-68-233405-8
Chapter 1. A Demon vs. His Arch-Nemesis; Chapter 2. Shiro and Daily Endeavours; Chapter 3. Discovery of Hell's Mysteries; Chapter 4. Hakutaku; Chapter 5. What Birthed Their Discord?; Chapter 6. Ogres, Underwear, and Crabs; Extra Chapter: Hell Affairs and This and That
2	August 23, 2011	978-4-06-387035-0	May 23, 2017	978-1-68-233598-7
Chapter 7. Hell's Yotsuya Taxi Kaiban; Chapter 8. Three Dead Animals!; Chapter 9. Duet of the Dragon and the Tiger; Chapter 10. A Mental Sports Festival; Chapter 11. Catparazzi; Chapter 12. Hell Ideal, Peach Maki; Extra Chapters: Hell Affairs and This and That; Sata. 2 — New (Hell) Recruits; Sata. 3 — Chatting with Lord Enma; Extra Chapter: Japan Afterlife University. Hell Department. Mythology Diversion. Japanese Studies Major.
3	November 22, 2011	978-4-06-387061-9	December 5, 2017	978-1-68-233599-4
Chapter 13. Man, Woman and Crushing Hell; Chapter 14. Hell Style Acupuncture; Chapter 15. Kachi-Kachi Hell; Chapter 16. An Extreme Example of Ruination Caused by Alcohol and Women; Chapter 17. A Swarm of Drunkards; Chapter 18. The Mundane World as Seen Through Enma's Crystal Mirror; Chapter 19. An Unsavoury Brawl; Chapter 20. The Beautiful Always Cry for the Moon; Extra Chapters: Hell Affairs and This and That; Sata. 4 — Right-Hand Blues; Sata. 5 — Right-Hand Blues Revisited
4	February 23, 2012	978-4-06-387086-2	February 6, 2018	978-1-64-212097-4
Chapter 21. Thirty-Six Views of Hell; Chapter 22. The Ten King's Banquet; Chapter 23. Hell's Obon Festival; Chapter 24. Lady Lilith; Chapter 25. A Man of Pride; Chapter 26. The Formerly Issun-Boshi; Chapter 27. Diets are Hellish; Chapter 28. The Reason Yokai Spread to China; Chapter 29. The Mountain Sisters' Morass
5	May 23, 2012	978-4-06-387110-4	December 21, 2021	978-1-63-699522-9
Chapter 30. The Battle of Children's Limbo; Chapter 31. Oban Koban; Chapter 32. The Difference in Intensity Between Fanatics and Non-Fanatics; Chapter 33. Hell's Regular Board Meeting; Chapter 34. A Day in the Life of Shiro; Chapter 35. Differences Between the East and West; Chapter 36. Is Art Explosive?; Chapter 37. Ancient Afterlife Revolution; Chapter 38. Unidentified Animal Spotted
6	August 23, 2012	978-4-06-387135-7	January 18, 2022	978-1-63-699562-5
Chapter 39. A Hell Fox's Proper Place; Chapter 40. Yuzu-Yuzu-Yu; Chapter 41. Ona-No-Takamura; Chapter 42. Mission: Possible; Chapter 43. A Man of Many Views; Chapter 44. Even Dinos are Dead; Chapter 45. Blessed Cacao Beans; Chapter 46. Princess Sakuya's Showtime; Chapter 47. Fashion is Balance
7	November 22, 2012	978-4-06-387159-3	March 15, 2022	978-1-63-699654-7
Chapter 48. The Hell of Many Orders & Comparing Dogs to Cats; Chapter 49. 24-Hour Crow Tengu Police; Chapter 50. Storytime with Rurio; Chapter 51. The Line Between Workaholics and Workmen; Chapter 52. Ladies Love Shopping; Chapter 53. Movie Talk: Goldfish Green Room; Chapter 54. The One Whatchamacallit Technique You See Now and Then; Chapter 55. Malediction of a Miffed Maiden; Chapter 56. Snow Ogre
8	February 22, 2013	978-4-06-387190-6	June 21, 2022	978-1-68-491172-1
Chapter 57. Eight Cold Hells; Chapter 58. I Guess They Are Kinda Similar; Chapter 59. Takamura the Oddball; Chapter 60. Ghosts = Dead = People; Chapter 61. The Urashimas' Ambivalent Taro; Chapter 62. Slander Hell; Chapter 63. King Gokan's First Aide; Chapter 64. Kaisuke the Money; Chapter 65. Lady Lilith's Tour of Greece
9	May 23, 2013	978-4-06-387212-5	July 19, 2022	978-1-68-491353-4
Chapter 66. Zashiki-Warashi; Chapter 67. Family; Chapter 68. The Messiah Reborn; Chapter 69. How to Train Your Zashiki-Warashi; Chapter 70. Tsuzura; Chapter 71. Idol Frontline; Chapter 72. Hot Rod Kasha; Chapter 73. Lavatory Horrors; Chapter 74. Japanese Shapeshifting Animals 101
10	August 23, 2013	978-4-06-387240-8	September 20, 2022	978-1-68-491444-9
Chapter 75. House of Horror; Chapter 76. Adults Strike While the Iron is Hot; Chapter 77. Under the Sod; Chapter 78. A Devil and Demon's Despicable Diplomacy; Chapter 79. A Rabbit Named Karashi; Chapter 80. Plague Demons; Chapter 81. A Snow Ogre Cometh; Chapter 82. Beauty is in the Eye of the Beholder; Chapter 83. Strikingly Similar
11	November 22, 2013	978-4-06-387269-9	November 15, 2022	978-1-68-491541-5
Chapter 84. Office Ogre; Chapter 85. Lethal Workaholic; Chapter 86. Bugs; Chapter 87. The Court of Boring; Chapter 88. My Fair Oko; Chapter 89. Funky Freaky Yokai; Chapter 90. No Grudge, No Gusto; Chapter 91. Please Rest, Japanese People; Chapter 92. Walk Like an Ancient Egyptian
12	December 20, 2013	978-4-06-387273-6	February 28, 2023	978-1-68-491642-9
Chapter 93. Hay Fever; Chapter 94. Scape the White Goat; Chapter 95. A Mother and Her Precious Kids; Chapter 96. Yakan Siblings; Chapter 97. In Those Days You Were Angsty; Chapter 98. The Sanzu River; Chapter 99. Art Was Expensive; Chapter 100. Storytime with King Enma; Chapter 101. Go Home, Crane
13	February 21, 2014	978-4-06-387295-8	April 25, 2023	978-1-68-491903-1
Chapter 102. Hell Warden for a Day; Chapter 103. Slippery as a Catfish; Chapter 104. Indulging in Western Clothing; Chapter 105. Older Sister; Chapter 106. Greetings, Ghosts; Chapter 107. Dogs of Hell; Chapter 108. Mountains are Monstrous; Chapter 109. Anubis the Grave Keeper; Chapter 110. Dakini of the Welcoming Committee (Part One)
14	May 23, 2014	978-4-06-388333-6	June 27, 2023	978-1-68-491979-6
Chapter 111. Dakini of the Welcoming Committee (Part Two); Chapter 112. School; Chapter 113. You'd Better Have a Go-To Song Ready; Chapter 114. Design Siblings; Chapter 115. Beat the Heat; Chapter 116. Keukegen; Chapter 117. An Auspicious Alliance; Chapter 118. Fortune-Telling is Hit or Miss; Chapter 119. Cat Congregation
15	August 22, 2014	978-4-06-388361-9	August 22, 2023	979-8-88-933103-2
Chapter 120. Folktale Folks; Chapter 121. Hell Hot Springs; Chapter 122. Jiangshi (Part One); Chapter 123. Jiangshi (Part Two); Chapter 124. Jiangshi (Part Three); Chapter 125. Woe be Upon Studying; Chapter 126. Jealousy Jet; Chapter 127. Apparition Amusements; Chapter 128. Hell RPG: The Five Crags
16	November 21, 2014	978-4-06-388393-0	October 31, 2023	979-8-88-933197-1
Chapter 129. Curry Day; Chapter 130. What in Blazes is a "Magical Girl"?; Chapter 131. The Geezer and the Granny; Chapter 132. Don't Bite the Hand that Feeds You; Chapter 133. Animals Never Forget One's Kindness; Chapter 134. A Hel Akin to a Hitchcock Movie; Chapter 135. Peerless at Poker; Chapter 136. The Legend of Karashi; Chapter 137. Mortal Realm Divine Comedy
17	February 23, 2015	978-4-06-388426-5	November 28, 2023	979-8-88-933279-4
Chapter 138. Colors Aplenty; Chapter 139. Fundamentally; Chapter 140. Shiro's Butt is in a Real Jam; Chapter 141. Mirror; Chapter 142. Dereliction of Duty; Chapter 143. Haunted House Revisited; Chapter 144. Arch of Ech; Chapter 145. Reviewing the Basics; Chapter 146. Shojin Otoshi
18	May 22, 2015	978-4-06-388457-9	January 16, 2024	979-8-88-933346-3
Chapter 147. A Lecture on Cursed by Monsters Born from Curses; Chapter 148. The Sparrow Lodge; Chapter 149. The Man Who Learned from Yokai and the Woman Who Makes Use of Yokai; Chapter 150. The Woman Who Makes Use of Yokai and the Man on the Sid of Yokai; Chapter 151. Dr Bird Head; Chapter 152. The Goddess is Pushy; Chapter 153. Please Turnip for the Demon Parade; Chapter 154. Root Rodent; Chapter 155. Autumn, the Season of Appetites
19	August 21, 2015	978-4-06-388486-9	March 19, 2024	979-8-88-933415-6
Chapter 156. Cause of Death; Chapter 157. Engagement Annulment; Chapter 158. Chef Miki; Chapter 159. Japanese-Style; Chapter 160. Amanojaku; Chapter 161. Act in Good Faith; Chapter 162. A Fun Look; Chapter 163. Covered in Fur and Cat Ashes; Extra: Interview
20	November 20, 2015	978-4-06-358781-4	May 21, 2024	979-8-88-933492-7
Chapter 164. Types; Chapter 165. The Blossom Front; Chapter 166. Blossom Dog; Chapter 167. A Name Never Remembered; Chapter 168. Ogre Soakers; Chapter 169. Even a Deviant has a Soul; Chapter 170. The Mechanical Chief of Staff; Chapter 171. The Zashiki-Warashi's Long Night; Chapter 172. Lottery
21	March 23, 2016	978-4-06-358804-0	July 16, 2024	979-8-88-933624-2
Chapter 173. Gon Gets to Work; Chapter 174. I Hesitate to Assume Someone is a Thief at First Glace; Chapter 175. Burning Mortal Realm; Chapter 176. Karuta; Chapter 177. Necessary Expenditures; Chapter 178. Disguise; Chapter 179. Court Appeal; Chapter 180. Fish Hell; Chapter 181. Mistress of Hell
22	July 22, 2016	978-4-06-388618-4	September 17, 2024	979-8-88-933749-2
Chapter 182. Sacred Tree; Chapter 183. Is Hell you Intended Destination?; Chapter 184. Games; Chapter 185. Basically Poison; Chapter 186. Statues; Chapter 187. Waste-Free; Chapter 188. Mixed Marital Arts Contest; Chapter 189. Pursuers of Beauty; Chapter 190. Recruiter Handbook
23	November 22, 2016	978-4-06-388660-3	November 19, 2024	979-8-88-933750-8
Chapter 191. The Heian Aristocrats' Not-So-Peaceful Poetry Contest; Chapter 192. The Eye of Horus Goes Round and Round; Chapter 193. One Soup. Three Dishes. Ten Meats; Chapter 194. A Roach by Any Other Name Would Look as Vile; Chapter 195. Time; Chapter 196. Depictions of Tokyo Hell; Chapter 197. Marriages are Made in Hell; Chapter 198. Ghosts and Spirits; Chapter 199. What Will Be Will Be
24	March 23, 2017	978-4-06-388701-3	January 21, 2025	979-8-88-933751-5
Chapter 200. Kids are Magma; Chapter 201. What is Strength?; Chapter 202. An Orge's Indiscretions; Chapter 203. An Age of Freedom; Chapter 204. Money Comes and Goes; Chapter 205. The New Year's God's Year-End Gift; Chapter 206. Lucky Bag; Chapter 207. Ghost Draft; Chapter 208. Digital Decedent Mk.I Should Arrive Before Long
25	September 22, 2017	978-4-06-510212-1	March 18, 2025	979-8-88-933752-2
Chapter 209. A Helping Hand is Not so Easy to Come By; Chapter 210. Curious Crypts; Chapter 211. Rumble in Crushing Hell (Part One); Chapter 212. Rumble in Crushing Hell (Part Two); Chapter 213. Rumble in Crushing Hell (Part Three); Chapter 214. To You Heart's Content; Chapter 215. Face; Chapter 216. Madame Phantom; Chapter 217. A Hellish Presentation
26	March 23, 2018	978-4-06-511108-6	May 20, 2025	979-8-88-933753-9
Chapter 218. Cooking; Chapter 219. March of the Delinquents; Chapter 220. Clear Your Mind; Chapter 221. Casual Play; Chapter 222. Mujina; Chapter 223. Fruits of the Land and Sea; Chapter 224. The Five Officials; Chapter 225. The Underling Life is Rough But Rich; Chapter 226. Miss Chili Pepper
27	September 21, 2018	978-4-06-512406-2	August 19, 2025	979-8-88-933754-6
Chapter 227. Casting Matters; Chapter 228. Battle of the Generations at Absolute Zero; Chapter 229. Jumbo Home Improvement Store; Chapter 230. Beauty is Scary; Chapter 231. The Medicine of Listening; Chapter 232. Positions; Chapter 233. Hell Music Festival; Chapter 234. Ogre & Devil & Jiangshi & Daoshi; Chapter 235. Letters are Your Friends
28	March 22, 2019	978-4-06-514959-1	November 18, 2025	979-8-88-933755--3
Chapter 236. Lets Play with Anime; Chapter 237. There's Almost Nothing Thoth Can't Solve; Chapter 238. Shiro's...Smart?; Chapter 239. Gentleman; Chapter 240. Devilish; Chapter 241. The Karmic Roots of Popularity; Chapter 242. Fukuro-Sage; Chapter 243. Catapult Appliance Talk; Chapter 244. Festivals are Full of Surprises
29	September 20, 2019	978-4-06-514959-1	February 17, 2026	979-8-88-933756-0
Chapter 245. Mujina Dog; Chapter 246. Good Workers are Generally Genuine; Chapter 247. Reception; Chapter 248. Day of Ghouls (Part One); Chapter 249. Day of Ghouls (Part Two); Chapter 250. The Assembly of Aides; Chapter 251. The Monolithic Nanja Monja; Chapter 252. Difficulty: Extreme; Chapter 253. Sparks of Rumors
30	March 23, 2020	978-4-06-518876-7	April 21, 2026	979-8-88-933757-7
Chapter 254. Bull Rush; Chapter 255. Political Rhapsody; Chapter 256. Haruichi the Trailblazer; Chapter 257. Both Are Bad; Chapter 258. Fiction; Chapter 259. The Stable Ba and Unstable Ka; Chapter 260. Big Role? Big Whoop!; Chapter 261. A Casual Party; Chapter 262. Poisonous
31	September 23, 2020	978-4-06-520361-3	June 23, 2026	979-8-88-933758-4
Chapter 263. The Gentleman Cat Means No Harm; Chapter 264. Names Are Powerful; Chapter 265. The Wicked Spirt and Her Companions; Chapter 266. Reiwa Momotaro Co.; Chapter 267. Gon-chan's Cane; Chapter 268. Adding Flair; Chapter 269. The Four Pillars of Family Gatherings: Coming of Age, Weddings, Funerals, and Memorials (Part One); Chapter 270. The Four Pillars of Family Gatherings: Coming of Age, Weddings, Funerals, and Memorials (Part Two); Chapter 271. The Nature of Nurture

=== Hozuki no Reitetsu: Shiro no Ashiato ===
No.	Japanese release date	Japanese ISBN
1	November 22, 2016	978-4-06-393077-1
2	July 21, 2017	978-4-06-393231-7
3	September 21, 2018	978-4-06-513199-2
4	September 20, 2019	978-4-06-516957-5
5	September 23, 2020	978-4-06-520538-9
