= Yoshizaki =

Yoshizaki (written: 吉崎 or 芳崎) is a Japanese surname. Notable people with the surname include:

- Hibiki Yoshizaki (吉崎 響, born 1980), Japanese animator
- Mine Yoshizaki (吉崎 観音, born 1971), Japanese manga artist
- Seimu Yoshizaki (芳崎 せいむ), Japanese manga artist

== See also ==
- Yoshizaki-gobō, a former Buddhist temple in Arawashi, Sakai District, Fukui Prefecture, Japan
