= Hakai =

Hakai may refer to:

- Hakai (album), a 2008 album by Wagdug Futuristic Unity
- Hakai (manga), a manga series by Suzuki Matsuo and Naoki Yamamoto
- Hakai (novel), a 1906 novel by Tōson Shimazaki
  - Hakai (film), a 1948 film based on the novel
- Hakai Institute a research institute on Calvert Island, British Columbia, Canada
  - Hakai Magazine, an online magazine by the Hakai Institute
