= Tetsuko no Tabi =

Japanese manga series

- First tankōbon volume cover

鉄子の旅
- Manga
- Written by: Hirohiko Yokomi
- Illustrated by: Naoe Kikuchi
- Published by: Shogakukan
- Magazine: Monthly Ikki
- Original run: November 30, 2001 – October 25, 2006
- Volumes: 6 + 2 extras
- Anime television series
- Directed by: Akinori Nagaoka
- Written by: Kazuhiko Sōma
- Music by: Cher Watanabe
- Studio: Group TAC
- Original network: Family Gekijo
- Original run: June 24, 2007 – September 23, 2007
- Episodes: 13
- Manga

Shin Tetsuko no Tabi
- Written by: Hirohiko Yokomi
- Illustrated by: Kanoko Hoashi
- Published by: Shogakukan
- Magazine: Monthly Ikki
- Original run: May 25, 2009 – January 25, 2013
- Volumes: 5 + 1 extra
- Manga

Tetsuko no Tabi 3-daime
- Written by: Hirohiko Yokomi
- Illustrated by: Akira Kirioka
- Published by: Shogakukan
- Magazine: Monthly Sunday Gene-X
- Original run: May 19, 2016 – January 19, 2019
- Volumes: 4
- icon

Tetsuko no Tabi (鉄子の旅; lit. 'Tetsuko's Travels') is a Japanese non-fiction manga series authored by Hirohiko Yokomi and illustrated by Naoe Kikuchi. The manga was serialized in Shogakukan's seinen manga magazine Monthly Ikki between 2001 and 2006. A 13-episode anime television series adaptation by Group TAC was broadcast in 2007.

== Overview ==
Tetsuko no Tabi is a non-fiction manga series inspired by Getting On and Off of JR's 4600 Stations (1998), a book by Hirohiko Yokomi documenting his journey to every train station in Japan. The project began when Shogakukan's Monthly Ikki editor-in-chief Hideki Egami sought to adapt Yokomi's travels into manga. Shogakukan editor and avid railfan Masahiko Ishikawa then recruited Naoe Kikuchi—a rising artist who had previously worked on shorts for the publisher—marking her debut serialized work. The series follows Kikuchi herself as she travels alongside Yokomi and Ishikawa, transforming their real-life adventures into manga.

== Characters ==
Hirohiko Yokomi
Voiced by: Nobuyuki Hiyama
The travel-writer, who turns out to be a huge train-fan. He has a lot of energy and passion for trains, and sometimes girls, but also micro-manages all their trips, planning every detail down to the second. He cares mostly about following the schedule and successfully achieving his planned goals (e.g. visiting all stations on a line in a completely bizarre order to accommodate infrequent trains).
Naoe Kikuchi
Voiced by: Akira Tomisaka
A manga artist. She has no interest in trains whatsoever, and she keeps getting freaked out by Yokomi's antics. She is also cynical, sarcastic, and rather lazy, mainly looking forward to the next ekiben.
Masahiko Ishikawa
Voiced by: Tokuyoshi Kawashima
Kikuchi's editor, another train geek.
Masaki Kamimura
Voiced by: Tetsuharu Ōta
Kikuchi's second editor.

== Media ==
=== Manga ===
Created by Hirohiko Yokomi and Naoe Kikuchi, Tetsuko no Tabi debuted in Shogakukan's Spirits Zōkan Ikki (Note: Re-branded as Monthly Ikki in 2003.) on November 30, 2001. The series finished on October 25, 2006. (Note: The series finished in the magazine's December 2006 issue, released on October 25 of that same year.) Shogakukan collected its chapters in six tankōbon volumes, released from November 30, 2004, to February 28, 2007. The series was again intermittently serialized from 2007, with chapters collected in a single volume, titled Tetsuko no Tabi Plus, released on February 25, 2009. An additional volume, titled Tetsuko no Tabi: Kikuchi Naoe Selection (鉄子の旅 ほあしかのこセレクション), was released on February 17, 2017.

A sequel, titled Shin Tetsuko no Tabi (新・鉄子の旅), illustrated by Kanoko Hoashi, was serialized in Monthly Ikki from May 25, 2009, to January 25, 2013. Shogakukan collected its chapters in five tankōbon volumes, released from February 25, 2010, to March 29, 2013. An additional volume, titled Shin Tetsuko no Tabi: Hoashi Kanoko Selection (新・鉄子の旅 ほあしかのこセレクション), was released on February 17, 2017.

Another manga series, titled Tetsuko no Tabi 3-daime (鉄子の旅 3代目), illustrated by Akira Kirioka, was serialized in Monthly Sunday Gene-X from May 19, 2016, to January 19, 2019. Shogakukan collected its chapters in four volumes, released from February 17, 2017, to July 19, 2019.

=== Anime ===
A 13-episode anime television series adaptation, animated by Group TAC, was broadcast on the cable television station Family Gekijo from June 24 to September 23, 2007. Toei Video collected the episodes in five DVD sets, released from September 21, 2007, to January 21, 2008.
