= Afterschool Charisma =

Japanese manga series by Kumiko Suekane

- First tankōbon volume cover

放課後のカリスマ (Hokago no Charisma)
- Genre: Fantasy, thriller
- Manga
- Written by: Kumiko Suekane
- Published by: Shogakukan
- English publisher: NA: Viz Media; SG: Chuang Yi
- Imprint: Ikki Comix
- Magazine: Monthly Ikki
- Original run: April 25, 2008 – September 25, 2014
- Volumes: 12
- icon

Afterschool Charisma (Japanese: 放課後のカリスマ, Hepburn: Hokago no Charisma) is a Japanese manga series written and illustrated by Kumiko Suekane. It was serialized in Shogakukan's seinen manga magazine Monthly Ikki from April 2008 to September 2014, and its chapters were compiled by Shogakukan and released into twelve tankōbon volumes. The manga is licensed in North America by Viz Media, and was partially available online at their website.

In developing the manga, Suekane felt it would be interesting to have "many great personages" together, and so she conceived of the idea of cloning them and putting them into the same world.

== Story ==
St. Kleio Academy is a very exclusive high school which restricts its enrollment to the clones of famous historical figures. The only exception seems to be the new transfer student Shirou Kamiya, the son of one of the main scientists involved in the cloning project. Shirou does his best to fit in, however, many of his classmates envy him because of the privilege he has as a human being even though Shirou wants nothing more than to help his new friends. Unlike Shirou, whose destiny has not been predetermined by history, the clones must closely study the achievements of their originals so that they can finish what their originals started. The students become ever more fearful of their futures, however, when the clone of John F. Kennedy is assassinated during his first presidential campaign in a manner similar to his original and they begin to seek out ways to alter their allegedly inevitable fates.

== Characters ==
=== Students ===
Shirou Kamiya (神矢史良)
Shirou Kamiya is the son of Dr. Kamiya and the only human student attending St. Kleio Academy. Both of these factors have earned him the resentment of his classmates even though he is good friends with several of them. The recent appearance of a man named Kai, who looks like him and claims to be a clone (later proven true), in addition to comments by Rockswell, has led Shirou to question his true identity.
Napoleon Bonaparte
Napoleon Bonaparte is the clone of the famous French emperor. Gregarious, he is one of Shirou's closest friends in the school. He has grown to a somewhat greater height already than his original is believed to have possessed. Though skeptical about the potency of the Almighty Dolly, he goes along with the rituals due to the influence of his friends, particularly Joan of Arc, whom he admires deeply. This goes to the point where he agrees to light the pyre in her mock burning at the stake, and is therefore deeply affected by her death when it goes awry.
Ikkyu (一休)
Ikkyu is the clone of the famous Japanese Zen Buddhist priest. He is very friendly and admired among the clones, spreading good cheer, mischief, and Buddhist ideals. He wears glasses, which his original did not due to the time period.
Sigmund Freud
Sigmund Freud is the clone of the famous Austrian psychologist. He commonly views the actions of his fellow students through the lens of his original's theories about parental complexes and sexual drives, and always assumes the worst about anti-clone movements. Though he does have a rather stable place in the main characters' circle of friends due to his intelligence, they are often put off by his constant mockery.
Carl Jung
The clone of the famous Swiss psychologist. Like his predecessor, he has a rivalry with the clone of Sigmund Freud.
Elizabeth Tudor (Elizabeth I)
Elizabeth Tudor is the clone of the famous English queen. Elizabeth is a hopeless romantic who yearns to be a wife and mother despite the fact that her original was well known for her chastity and her dedication to England. At the same time, however, Elizabeth fears that she may well die alone because, as a clone, she must follow the path of her original even if it means that she must set aside her own dreams. After the scarred Kai tells his story, and seeing how her preceding clone was, she left the academy with him and Hitler.
Florence Nightingale
Florence Nightingale is the clone of the famous English nurse. Caring and maternal, she gets along well with her fellow clones, though they are often embarrassed by her excessive physical affection.
Marie Curie (Maria Skłodowska-Curie)
Marie Curie is the clone of the famous Polish-French female scientist. As a clone, Marie is expected to follow the path of her original, however, she is far more passionate about music than physics and chemistry, especially inspired by the works of Mozart. At the start of the manga Shirou persuades his father to allow Marie to study music instead and she is supposedly transferred to a music school, but due to Rockswell's attempted killing of Pandora and his comments afterwards, it is implied that the Marie Curie that Shirou knew was killed, though Volume 7 reveals this to not be the case.
Adolf Hitler
Adolf Hitler is the clone of the infamous Nazi politician. Hitler, whose peers despise and even shun him because of his original, is a surprisingly benign boy who has vowed to atone for the sins of his original. Hitler was one of the first of the clones to befriend Shirou because he viewed Shirou as a fellow outcast. He is hopeful that the Almighty Dolly is merciful, and believes that she helped him and Shirou to save Mozart's life. When the false nature of the cult of Dolly is exposed by Rasputin's confession and Joan's death, he refuses to cease believing in the Almighty Dolly and shows signs of developing his original's misanthropy, to the point of shoving several charms down Rasputin's throat. He leaves the academy with the scarred Kai and Elizabeth.
Wolfgang Amadeus Mozart
Wolfgang Amadeus Mozart is the clone of the famous Austrian musician. He provided Marie Curie's clone with some of his original's work, but he is insensitive to her lack of desire to pursue her original's studies of radiation and views her as a failure for not following her destiny. He believes in the inherent superiority of clones to normal humans as they possess a higher purpose, to give a second life to great figures. For these reasons he clashes with Shirou, who challenges him to a duel to avenge his disregard for Marie Curie. Unable to live up to the pressure, he hangs himself, though Shirou and Hitler find him in time to save his life.
Joan of Arc (Jeanne d'Arc)
Joan of Arc is the clone of the famous French heroine who turned the tide of the Hundred Years War between France and England in favor of France. She is deeply devoted to the Almighty Dolly, as opposed to sharing her original's deep Catholic faith. It is arranged that her mock burning at the stake will take place at the expo, to demonstrate the malleability of clones' destinies; however, various events lead to her execution becoming genuine.
Grigori Efimovich Rasputin (Григорий Ефимович Распутин)
Grigori Efimovich Rasputin is the clone of the infamous Russian mystic who once wielded great influence over the Russian court. He orchestrates the cult of the Almighty Dolly at the direction of school officials, demonstrating the desperation of the clones and their gullibility. He believed that this would get him sent home.
Albert Einstein
Albert Einstein is the clone of the famous German physicist. He created the "Almighty Dolly" charms, believing in conjunction with Rasputin that this experiment would set them free from the school. However, during the Striker attack on the academy, he was killed by his preceding clone.
Himiko (卑弥呼)
Himiko is the clone of the legendary queen of the Japanese kingdom of Yamataikoku. She was one of the foremost runners of the cult of the Almighty Dolly, just below Rasputin and Einstein; however, when it was unmasked at the expo, she newly perceives the futility of clone existence and joins the Strikers to kill all clones.
Empress Dowager Cixi (慈禧太后)
Cixi is the clone of the famous Chinese empress. She is confident in being able to fill the shoes of her original, as according to her the empress succeeded primarily through use of her beauty, which as her clone she already possesses.
Charles Darwin
Charles Darwin is the clone of the famous English scientist who developed the theory of evolution. He claims that evolutionary theory applies to clones, and the Strikers' manifestation as terrorists instead of successors to their originals is merely a failure on which natural selection is doing its work.
John F. Kennedy
John F. Kennedy is the clone of the famous American president. His mysterious assassination during his first presidential campaign strikes fear into his former classmates and spreads the belief that all clones are destined to have the same fate as their originals.

=== Faculty ===
Dr. Kamiya (神矢)
The father of Shiro, Dr. Kamiya may show little emotion, but he truly cares for his son's well-being. He is eventually revealed to be a clone of Kai.
Kuroe (黒江)
A teacher at St. Cleo, especially judo. He has shown that he truly cares for the well-being of the clones, and openly shows his dislike of Rockswell.
Rockswell
The director of St. Cleo and the adoptive father of Pandora. Rockswell is a man with a childish attitude, which is part of why no one at the academy likes him. He also likes to spend his time goofing off, and usually forces one or more of the students to accompany him. He sees clones as less than human beings, and does not hesitate to kill clones if they are "not needed anymore," as he demonstrated when he attempted to strangle Pandora. It is hinted that he is in league with the Strikers.

=== Other ===
Pandora
Pandora is the clone of Marie Curie. Rockswell initially introduces her as his adopted daughter, however, he later reveals that she is yet another Marie Curie clone. Pandora was created because the first Marie Curie clone refused to follow the path of her original but Rockswell later attempts to strangle her after Shirou insists that Pandora cannot be Marie Curie due to the differing memories between the two clones. Shirou, however, still saves Pandora's life despite the revelation and the traumatized Pandora immediately abandons Rockswell to be with Shirou, who takes her under his wing.
Kai
Kai is a man who physically resembles Shirou in appearance, although he is much older. It is later revealed that there are many other clones of Kai, with Dr. Kamiya and Shiro being among them. The purpose of the Kai clones is to serve as the guardians of the other clones. One Kai, who has a scar above his nose, became weary of how people were treating the clones he grew up with. So he gathered them all and formed the Strikers, with the goal of killing all the clones at St Kleio Academy, and then themselves, as they believe that there is no need for the clones to even exist.
Leonardo da Vinci
Leonardo da Vinci is the clone of the famous Italian polymath during the European renaissance. He served as the director of the St. Kleio Academy until the scarred Kai killed a Marie Curie clone and then left the academy.

== Release ==
Written and illustrated by Kumiko Suekane, Afterschool Charisma was serialized in Shogakukan's Monthly Ikki from April 25, 2008, to September 25, 2014. Shogakukan collected its chapters in twelve tankōbon volumes, released from July 29, 2009, to November 28, 2014.

In North America, the series has been licensed for English language release by Viz Media.

=== Volumes ===
No.	Original release date	Original ISBN	English release date	English ISBN
1	July 29, 2009	978-4-09-188466-4	June 15, 2010	978-1421533971
2	May 29, 2009	978-4-09-188467-1	January 18, 2011	978-1421533988
3	November 30, 2009	978-4-09-188487-9	June 21, 2011	978-1421537269
4	June 30, 2010	978-4-09-188519-7	October 18, 2011	978-1421540214
5	December 25, 2010	978-4-09-188535-7	January 17, 2012	978-1421540801
6	June 30, 2011	978-4-09-188548-7	July 10, 2012	978-1421542171
7	January 30, 2012	978-4-09-188572-2	January 15, 2013	978-1421549224
8	July 30, 2012	978-4-09-188593-7	October 15, 2013	978-1421558912
9	February 28, 2013	978-4-09-188617-0	April 15, 2014	978-1421562360
10	November 8, 2013	978-4-09-188636-1	December 16, 2014	978-1421573472
11	October 30, 2014	978-4-09-188666-8	December 15, 2015	978-1421581262
12	November 28, 2014	978-4-09-188669-9	December 20, 2016	978-1421583921

== Reception ==
Deb Aoki, writing for About.com, enjoyed the "inventive premise" of the series, feeling that the use of historical figures added to the characterisation of the clones. Comic Book Bin's Leroy Douresseaux's first impression was of "a rather peculiar boarding school drama", but felt that the development of the story signalled the manga was about "more than teen angst", describing it as an "engrossing read". Katherine Dacey of Manga Critic felt the story had potential that had not "gelled yet" at the conclusion of the first volume.
