= Watashi no Uchū =

Japanese manga series

- First tankōbon volume cover

わたしの宇宙
- Genre: Metafiction
- Manga
- Written by: Ayako Noda
- Published by: Shogakukan
- Imprint: Ikki Comix
- Magazine: Monthly Ikki
- Original run: October 25, 2012 – March 24, 2014
- Volumes: 2
- icon

Watashi no Uchū (わたしの宇宙; 'My Universe') is a Japanese manga series written and illustrated by Ayako Noda. It was serialized in Shogakukan's seinen manga magazine Monthly Ikki from October 2012 to March 2014, with its chapters collected in two tankōbon volumes.

== Publication ==
Written and illustrated by Ayako Noda, Watashi no Uchū was serialized in Shogakukan's seinen manga magazine Monthly Ikki from October 25, 2012, to March 24, 2014. Shogakukan collected its chapters in two tankōbon volumes, released on August 30, 2013, and August 29, 2014.

=== Volumes ===
No.	Japanese release date	Japanese ISBN
1	August 30, 2013	978-4-09-188630-9
2	August 29, 2014	978-4-09-188661-3

== See also ==
- Double, another manga series by the same author
