= Double (manga) =

Japanese manga series

- First volume cover

ダブル
- Genre: Slice of life
- Manga
- Written by: Ayako Noda
- Published by: Hero's Inc.
- English publisher: NA: Tokyopop
- Magazine: Flat Hero's
- Original run: January 11, 2019 – present
- Volumes: 6
- Television drama
- Directed by: Kazuhiro Nakagawa
- Written by: Eriko Yoshida
- Original network: Wowow
- Original run: June 4, 2022 – August 6, 2022
- Episodes: 10

Double (Japanese: ダブル) is a Japanese manga series written and illustrated by Ayako Noda. It began serialization on the manga website Flat Hero's in January 2019; its individual chapters have been collected into six volumes as of September 2026. A live-action television series adaptation aired from June to August 2022.

== Media ==
=== Manga ===
Written and illustrated by Ayako Noda, the series began serialization on the Flat Hero's manga website on January 11, 2019. As of September 2026, six volumes have been released.

In July 2021, Tokyopop announced they licensed the series for English publication.

==== Volumes ====
No.	Original release date	Original ISBN	English release date	English ISBN
1	June 14, 2019	978-4-86-468652-5	January 25, 2022	978-1-42-786907-4
2	March 14, 2020	978-4-86-468708-9	March 22, 2022	978-1-42-786909-8
3	October 14, 2020	978-4-86-468759-1	May 3, 2022	978-1-42-786917-3
4	May 13, 2021	978-4-86-468806-2	August 9, 2022	978-1-42-786919-7
5	December 14, 2023	978-4-86-468222-0	December 3, 2024	978-1-42-787916-5
6	September 15, 2026	978-4-86-805237-1	—	—

=== Live-action ===
In March 2022, it was announced that the manga would be receiving a live-action television series adaptation. The series will be directed by Kazuhiro Nakagawa and scripted by Eriko Yoshida; Yudai Chiba and Kento Nagayama will perform the leads. It aired on various Wowow networks from June 4, 2022, to August 6, 2022.

== Reception ==
As part of Anime News Network's winter 2021 manga preview guide, Rebecca Silverman and Caitlin Moore reviewed the series for the website. Silverman praised the plot as unexpectedly dark. Meanwhile, Moore felt the series had a unique art style, which she had mixed feelings about. Sarah from Anime UK News also praised the series as intriguing and amusing.

At the 2020 Japan Media Arts Festival, the series won the excellence award in the manga division. In the same year, the series ranked 17th in the Next Manga Award in the web manga category.

== See also ==
- Watashi no Uchū, another manga series by the same author
