= Claude Horan =

American artist (1917–2014)

Claude Horan (29 October 1917 – 11 June 2014) was an American ceramicist, glass artist, and teacher. He collaborated with his wife Suzi Pleyte Horan on his large works. Horan started the ceramics program at the University of Hawai'i at Manoa.

== Early life and education ==
Claude Horan was born in Long Beach, California. He received a BA degree from San Jose State University in 1942 and an MA degree in art from Ohio State University in 1946.

== Career ==
Standing Female Figure by Claude Horan, stoneware with glaze and cobalt oxide, Honolulu Museum of Art

His wife Suzi Pleyte Horan collaborated on many of the larger projects. He was a lifeguard and longboard surfer in Santa Cruz in the late 1930s, and is credited with naming Steamer Lane.

He started the ceramics program at the University of Hawai'i at Manoa in 1947. After a sabbatical in 1967 during which he learned glass blowing, Horan established a glass blowing studio at the university in 1968. In 1978, he retired from the University of Hawaii as a professor emeritus. Horan's students include Toshiko Takaezu, Isami Enomoto, Henry Takemoto, Chiu Huan-tang and Harue Oyama McVay, who became chairman of the ceramics program upon Horan's retirement.

Standing Female Figure, in the collection of the Honolulu Museum of Art is an example of the whimsical ceramic figurines for which he is best known. He begins with a cylindrical vessel on the potter's wheel, onto which he sculpts human features. The Hawaii State Art Museum, the Honolulu Museum of Art, the Museum of Arts and Design (New York City), and the Division of Ceramics and Glass of the National Museum of American History (Washington, D.C.) are among the public collections holding work by Claude Horan.

He was named one of the Living Treasures of Hawaii in 1987, by the Honpa Hongwanji Mission of Hawaii.

== List of works ==
His sculptures in public places include:

- Untitled 1976 sculpture, Leilehua High School, Honolulu, Hawaii
- Hoʻolaulea (1976) and Cecil (1976), Red Hill Elementary School, Honolulu, Hawaii
- Vita Marinae, 1975, Waikiki Aquarium, Honolulu, Hawaii
- Na heʻenalu o kailua maluna o ke kilohana a na nalu, 1974, Kailua High School, Kailua, Hawaii
- Kiʻi Kalai Mea Pa'ani Na Kamaliʻi, 1974, Kealakehe Elementary School, Kailua-Kona, Hawaii
- The Stallion and His Crew, 1979, Pukalani Elementary School, Pukalani, Hawaii
- Moby Dick and Friends, 1980, Kekaha Elementary School, Kekaha, Hawaii
- In the Spirit of the Koolaus, 1980, Kalaheo High School, Kailua, Hawaii
