= Arigoke =

Japanese manga series

- First tankōbon volume cover

ありごけ
- Manga
- Written by: Michi Urushihara
- Published by: Shogakukan
- Magazine: Hibana
- Original run: March 6, 2015 – August 6, 2016
- Volumes: 2

Arigoke (ありごけ) is a Japanese manga series written and illustrated by Michi Urushihara. It was serialized in Shogakukan's seinen manga magazine Hibana from March 2015 to August 2016, with its chapters collected in two tankōbon volumes.

== Publication ==
Written and illustrated by Michi Urushihara, Arigoke was serialized in Shogakukan's seinen manga magazine Hibana from March 6, 2015, to August 6, 2016. Shogakukan collected its chapters in two tankōbon volumes, released on January 12 and November 11, 2016.

=== Volumes ===
No.	Japanese release date	Japanese ISBN
1	January 12, 2016	978-4-09-187353-8
2	November 11, 2016	978-4-09-189226-3

== See also ==
- Yorukumo, another manga series by the same author
