= G Senjō Heaven's Door =

Japanese manga series

- First volume cover

G戦場ヘヴンズドア (Jī Senjō Hevunzu Doa)
- Genre: Coming-of-age
- Manga
- Written by: Yoko Nihonbashi
- Published by: Shogakukan
- Imprint: Ikki Comix
- Magazine: Monthly Ikki
- Original run: November 30, 2000 – June 25, 2003
- Volumes: 3
- icon

G Senjō Heaven's Door (Japanese: G戦場ヘヴンズドア, Hepburn: Jī Senjō Hevunzu Doa; lit. 'G-battlefield Heaven's Door') is a Japanese manga series written and illustrated by Yoko Nihonbashi. It was serialized in Shogakukan's seinen manga magazine Monthly Ikki from November 2000 to June 2003, with its chapters published in three tankōbon volumes. It is about two boys, Machizo and Tetsuo, who work together to create manga.

== Plot ==
Machizo Sakaida is the son of Daizō Sakai, a renowned manga artist. Resenting his father's success, Machizo struggles to escape his shadow. After transferring to Tetsuo's school, Machizo clashes with him when Tetsuo attempts to enter a manga competition—hoping to win prize money for his mother's medical bills—by redrawing Oretachi no Banka, a series by Daizō. Machizo sabotages Tetsuo's early efforts, prompting Kumiko, a fierce admirer of Tetsuo, to retaliate. Eventually, Tetsuo recognizes Machizo's talent for writing, leading them to collaborate on a manga.

Meanwhile, it is revealed that Tetsuo's father—who had abandoned the family—seeks to cancel Oretachi no Banka. Additionally, Daizō had taken credit for a manga Tetsuo created, which inadvertently caused his mother's illness. Daizō claims his actions were meant to inspire Tetsuo to return to manga.

Machizo (writing) and Tetsuo (illustrating), aided by Kumiko's input, complete their manga just in time, earning the Special Merit Award. Daizō, serving as a judge, presents the prize and emotionally embraces Tetsuo, initially overlooking Machizo. However, Tetsuo's father imposes a new restriction: both must submit solo works for the next competition.

Following his mother's death, Tetsuo devotes himself obsessively to manga, while Machizo apprentices under another artist to hone his craft.

== Publication ==
Written and illustrated by Yoko Nihonbashi, G Senjō Heaven's Door started in the first issue of Shogakukan's Spirits Zōkan Ikki (re-branded as Monthly Ikki in 2003), released on November 30, 2000. The series finished on June 25, 2003. Shogakukan published its chapters in three tankōbon volumes, released from March 29 to September 30, 2003. A three-volume "Complete Edition" was published by Shogakukan between August 12 and October 12, 2016.

=== Volumes ===
No.	Release date	ISBN
1	March 29, 2003	4-09-188301-X
2	March 29, 2003	4-09-188302-8
3	September 30, 2003	4-09-188303-6

== Reception ==
G Senjō Heaven's Door was one of the Jury Recommended Works at the 7th Japan Media Arts Festival in 2003.

== See also ==
- Shojo Fight, another manga series by the same author
