= Dōbutsu no Oisha-san =

Japanese manga series and television drama

- Cover of the first tankōbon volume, featuring Chobi

動物のお医者さん
- Genre: Medical comedy
- Manga
- Written by: Noriko Sasaki
- Published by: Hakusensha
- Imprint: Hana to Yume Comics
- Magazine: Hana to Yume
- Original run: 1988 – 1993
- Volumes: 12

Dōbutsu no Oisha-san
- Written by: Ryota Kosawa; Furusawa Michiko; Eto Michiko
- Directed by: Shimako Satō; Masaki Fukasawa; Masahiro Kuno; Takashi Yamazaki
- Starring: Yoshizawa Yu; Jun Kaname; Takasugi Mizuho; Rio Hirai; Saki Kagami; Himura Akiko; Kyōko Kishida; Tōru Emori
- Voices of: Rumi Hiiragi; Keiko Yamamoto
- Narrated by: Keaton Yamada
- Ending theme: "Nadeshiko no Hana" performed by Mio Isayama
- Composer: Terashima Minya
- No. of seasons: 1
- No. of episodes: 11

Production
- Producer: Kotaro Takahashi
- Running time: 54 minutes
- Production company: TV Asahi

Original release
- Network: ANN
- Release: April 17 – June 26, 2003

Dōbutsu no Oisha-san (Japanese: 動物のお医者さん; lit. "Mr. Veterinarian") is a Japanese manga series written and illustrated by Noriko Sasaki. It was published in Hakusensha's shōjo manga magazine Hana to Yume from 1988 to 1993, with its chapters collected in 12 volumes. It received a TV drama adaptation, which was aired on ANN from April to June 2003 and had 11 episodes.

== Synopsis ==
Nishine Masaki, a young man from Hokkaido, is told by a mysterious man that he will become a veterinarian. Along with his best friend Nikaidou, and animal friends Chobi the dog, Mike the cat and Hiyo the rooster, Nishine sets out to fulfill his mysterious fate of becoming a veterinarian.

== Reception ==
By 2020, the manga had 21.6 million copies in circulation.
