= Babel (2012 manga) =

Japanese manga series

- First tankōbon volume cover
- Genre: Science fiction
- Manga
- Written by: Narumi Shigematsu
- Published by: Shogakukan
- Imprint: Ikki Comix
- Magazine: Monthly Ikki (May 25, 2012 – September 25, 2014)
- Original run: April 27, 2012 – August 28, 2015
- Volumes: 5
- icon

Babel (stylized in all caps) is a Japanese manga series written and illustrated by Narumi Shigematsu. Babel was first published as a tankōbon volume by Shogakukan in April 2012 and was later serialized in the publisher's seinen manga magazine Monthly Ikki from May 2012 to September 2014, when the magazine ceased its publication, and the series continued and finished with its fifth volume.

== Publication ==
Written and illustrated by Narumi Shigematsu, Babel was first released as a tankōbon volume by Shogakukan on April 27, 2012. Due to its popularity, Babel started its serialization in Shogakukan seinen manga magazine Monthly Ikki on May 25, 2012. The magazine ceased its publication on September 25, 2014, and the series would be finished with its fifth volume, released on August 28, 2015.

=== Volumes ===
No.	Japanese release date	Japanese ISBN
1	April 27, 2012	978-4-09-188584-5
2	February 28, 2013	978-4-09-188618-7
3	October 30, 2013	978-4-09-188634-7
4	June 30, 2014	978-4-09-188655-2
5	August 28, 2015	978-4-09-188683-5
