= Kūya Shōnin ga Ita =

Japanese manga series

- Tankōbon volume cover

空也上人がいた
- Novel
- Written by: Taichi Yamada
- Published by: Asahi Shimbun Publication
- Published: April 7, 2011
- Manga
- Written by: Taichi Yamada
- Illustrated by: Hideki Arai
- Published by: Shogakukan
- Imprint: Ikki Comix
- Magazine: Monthly Ikki
- Original run: October 25, 2013 – August 25, 2014
- Volumes: 1

Kūya Shōnin ga Ita (空也上人がいた) is a Japanese manga series, based on Taichi Yamada's novel of the same title, and illustrated by Hideki Arai. It was serialized in Shogakukan's seinen manga magazine Monthly Ikki from October 2013 to August 2014, with its chapters collected in a single volume.

== Publication ==
Written by Taichi Yamada, the Kūya Shōnin ga Ita novel was published by the Asahi Shimbun Publishing on April 7, 2011. The manga adaptation, illustrated by Hideki Arai, was serialized in Shogakukan's seinen manga magazine Monthly Ikki from October 25, 2013, to August 25, 2014. Shogakukan collected its chapters in a single tankōbon volume, released on September 30, 2014.

In France, the manga was licensed by Akata.

== Reception ==
In 2015, the manga adaptation won the Manga Honz Super New Award 2014 by the Japanese book recommendation website Honz.
