= The Kinks (manga) =

Japanese manga series

- First wideban volume cover

ザ・キンクス (Za Kinkusu)
- Genre: Comedy; Slice of life
- Manga
- Written by: Shunji Enomoto
- Published by: Kodansha
- Imprint: Wide KC Morning
- Magazine: Comic Days
- Original run: March 26, 2023 – present
- Volumes: 4
- icon

The Kinks (Japanese: ザ・キンクス, Hepburn: Za Kinkusu) is a Japanese manga series written and illustrated by Shunji Enomoto. It began serialization on Kodansha's Comic Days manga website in March 2023.

== Synopsis ==
The series centers around the mundane lives of the Kinku family. The novelist father, punk mother, coolheaded eldest daughter, and quiet son.

== Publication ==
Written and illustrated by Shunji Enomoto, The Kinks began serialization on Kodansha's Comic Days manga website on March 26, 2023. Its chapters have been compiled into four wideban volumes as of September 2026.

No.	Release date	ISBN
1	February 14, 2024	978-4-06-534584-9
2	September 20, 2024	978-4-06-536795-7
3	October 23, 2025	978-4-06-540761-5
4	September 18, 2026	978-4-06-544907-3

== Reception ==
The series was ranked fourth in the 2025 edition of Takarajimasha's Kono Manga ga Sugoi! guidebook's list of the best manga for male readers. The series was ranked seventh in Freestyle Magazine's "The Best Manga 2025" ranking in 2024. The series won the Short Work Prize at the 29th Tezuka Osamu Cultural Prize in 2025.
