= Lotta Rain =

Japanese manga series

- First tankōbon volume cover

ロッタレイン (Rotta Rein)
- Manga
- Written by: Tsuyoshi Matsumoto
- Published by: Shogakukan
- Imprint: Big Comics Special Hibana
- Magazine: Monthly Ikki (2014); Hibana (2015–2017)
- Original run: April 25, 2014 – June 7, 2017
- Volumes: 3
- icon

Lotta Rain (Japanese: ロッタレイン, Hepburn: Rotta Rein) is a Japanese manga series written and illustrated by Tsuyoshi Matsumoto. It was serialized in Shogakukan's seinen manga magazine Monthly Ikki from April to September 2014, when the magazine ceased its publication, and the series was transferred to Hibana, where it ran from March 2015 to June 2017.

== Plot ==
After the death of his mother, Hajime Tamai's life shatters when he witnesses his girlfriend having an affair with his boss. Distraught, he causes a bus accident and sustains major injuries. With nothing left, he is visited in the hospital by his estranged father and his 13-year-old stepsister, Hatsuho Yamaguchi, whom he has never met. His father proposes that they all live together. Despite Hatsuho's initial hostility, a romantic and sexual tension develops between her and Hajime, who is nearly 30.

== Publication ==
Written and illustrated by Tsuyoshi Matsumoto, Lotta Rain was serialized in Shogakukan's seinen manga magazine Monthly Ikki from April 25 to September 25, 2014, when the magazine ceased its publication. The series was transferred to Monthly Ikki's replacement, Hibana, where it ran from March 6, 2015, to June 7, 2017. Shogakukan collected its chapters in three tankōbon volumes, released from August 10 to October 12, 2017.

=== Volumes ===
No.	Japanese release date	Japanese ISBN
1	August 10, 2017	978-4-09-189527-1
2	September 12, 2017	978-4-09-189548-6
3	October 12, 2017	978-4-09-189737-4

== Reception ==
The series was recommended by Japanese filmmaker Makoto Shinkai. The series ranked 17th, alongside Adrian Tomine's Killing and Dying and Ai Tanaka's Limbo the King, on "The Best Manga 2018 Kono Manga wo Yome!" ranking by Freestyle magazine.
