= Takanashi-san =

Japanese manga series

- First volume cover

高梨さん
- Genre: Comedy
- Manga
- Written by: Motoyuki Ōta
- Published by: Shogakukan
- Imprint: Ikki Comix
- Magazine: Monthly Ikki
- Original run: September 25, 2009 – July 25, 2012
- Volumes: 3
- Television drama
- Original network: NHK 1seg 2; NHK-E
- Original run: April 1, 2013 – August 12, 2013
- Episodes: 20
- icon

Takanashi-san (高梨さん) is a Japanese manga series written and illustrated by Motoyuki Ōta. It was serialized in Shogakukan's seinen manga magazine Monthly Ikki from September 2009 to July 2012, with its chapters collected in three tankōbon volumes. It was adapted into a television drama series broadcast in 2013.

== Media ==
=== Manga ===
Takanashi-san is written and illustrated by Motoyuki Ōta. It was serialized in Shogakukan's seinen manga magazine Monthly Ikki from September 25, 2009, to July 25, 2012. Shogakukan published its chapters in three tankōbon volumes, released from May 28, 2010, to March 29, 2013.

=== Drama ===
A 20 five-minute episodes television drama adaptation; it was first broadcast in two episodes on NHK 1seg 2 in March 2013, and later on NHK-E from April 1 to August 12 of the same year.

== Reception ==
The series was recommended by manga author Makoto Yukimura, who drew commemorative illustration cards, alongside Tsuchika Nishimura, for the release of the second volume.
