= I'll Give It My All... Tomorrow =

Japanese manga series

- First tankōbon volume cover, featuring Shizuo Ōguro

俺はまだ本気出してないだけ (Ore wa Mada Honki Dashitenai Dake)
- Genre: Comedy; Slice of life
- Manga
- Written by: Shunju Aono
- Published by: Shogakukan
- English publisher: NA: Viz Media
- Imprint: Ikki Comix
- Magazine: Monthly Ikki
- Original run: January 25, 2007 – June 25, 2012
- Volumes: 5
- Manga

Ore wa Motto Honki Dashitenai Dake
- Written by: Shunju Aono
- Published by: Shogakukan
- Imprint: Ikki Comix
- Magazine: Monthly Ikki
- Original run: December 25, 2012 – April 25, 2013
- Volumes: 1
- Live-action film
- Directed by: Yūichi Fukuda
- Written by: Yūichi Fukuda
- Music by: Gontiti
- Studio: Shochiku
- Released: June 15, 2013
- Runtime: 105 minutes
- icon

I'll Give It My All... Tomorrow (Note: Japanese: 俺はまだ本気出してないだけ, Hepburn: Ore wa Mada Honki Dashitenai Dake lit. 'I Just Haven't Gone All Out Yet') is a Japanese manga series written and illustrated by Shunju Aono. It was serialized in Shogakukan's seinen manga magazine Monthly Ikki from January 2007 to June 2012, with its chapters collected in five tankōbon volumes. It was adapted into a live-action film released in June 2013. In North America, the manga was licensed for English release by Viz Media.

== Plot ==
Shizuo Ōguro is a forty-year-old salaryman going through a midlife crisis. He quits his job of fifteen years to find himself, despite being a single parent living with his teenage daughter and elderly father. Ōguro embarks on a hapless journey to achieve his dream of becoming a manga artist.

== Characters ==
Shizuo Ōguro (大黒シズオ, Ōguro Shizuo)
Portrayed by: Shinichi Tsutsumi
Suzuko Ōguro (大黒鈴子, Ōguro Suzuko)
Portrayed by: Ai Hashimoto
Shirō Ōguro (大黒志郎, Ōguro Shirō)
Portrayed by: Renji Ishibashi
Osamu Miyata (宮田修, Miyata Osamu)
Portrayed by: Katsuhisa Namase
Miyata's wife
Portrayed by: Miki Mizuno
Aya Unami (宇波綾, Unami Aya)
Portrayed by: Rino Sashihara

== Media ==
=== Manga ===
Written and illustrated by Shunju Aono, I'll Give It My All... Tomorrow was first published as a one-shot chapter in Shogakukan's seinen mangs magazine Monthly Ikki on January 25, 2007; the manga began its serialization in the same magazine on March 24 of that same year. In November 2008, the manga entered on hiatus due to Aono's health issues. It resumed publication on September 25, 2009. The manga finished on June 25, 2012. Shogakukan collected its chapters in five tankōbon volumes, released from October 30, 2007, to September 28, 2012.

In North America, Viz Media announced the English language release of the manga in May 2009. The five volumes were released from May 18, 2010, to July 16, 2013.

A spin-off series, titled Ore wa Motto Honki Dashitenai Dake (俺はもっと本気出してないだけ; lit. 'I Just Haven't Gone Even Further Yet') was serialized in Monthly Ikki from December 25, 2012, to April 25, 2013. Shogakukan compiled its chapters into a single tankōbon volume, published on May 30, 2013.

==== Volumes ====
No.	Original release date	Original ISBN	English release date	English ISBN
1	October 30, 2007	978-4-09-188377-3	May 18, 2010	978-1-4215-3365-0
2	April 26, 2008	978-4-09-188414-5	December 21, 2010	978-1-4215-3387-2
3	February 25, 2009	978-4-09-188427-5	May 17, 2011	978-1-4215-3388-9
4	June 30, 2010	978-4-09-188520-3	December 20, 2011	978-1-4215-4022-1
5	September 28, 2012	978-4-09-188520-3	July 16, 2013	978-1-4215-5481-5

=== Live-action film ===
A live-action film adaptation was announced in June 2012. The film is directed by Yūichi Fukuda, starring Shinichi Tsutsumi as Shizuo Ōguro. The acoustic guitar duo Gontiti scored the music and the all-female band Scandal performed the film's song theme "Awanai Tsumori no, Genki de ne" (会わないつもりの、元気でね; lit. 'I Don't Plan on Seeing You; Take Care'). The film was distributed by Shochiku and premiered on June 15, 2013.

== See also ==
- Million Yen Women, another manga series by the same author
