= Kajiba no Baka IQ =

Japanese manga series

- First tankōbon volume cover

火事場のバカIQ
- Genre: Gag
- Manga
- Written by: Shunji Enomoto
- Published by: Shogakukan
- Imprint: Ikki Comix
- Magazine: Monthly Ikki (January 25, 2013 – September 25, 2014)
- Original run: January 25, 2013 – January 30, 2019
- Volumes: 3
- icon

Kajiba no Baka IQ (火事場のバカIQ; lit. 'The Fierceness of an Idiot's IQ') is a Japanese anthology manga series written and illustrated by Shunji Enomoto. It was serialized in Shogakukan's seinen manga magazine Monthly Ikki from January 2013 to September 2014, when the magazine ceased its publication, and continued its publication directly in tankōbon format. Shogakukan released three volumes.

== Publication ==
Written and illustrated by Shunji Enomoto, Kajiba no Baka IQ was serialized in Shogakukan's seinen manga magazine Monthly Ikki from January 25, 2013, until the magazine's final issue, released on September 25, 2014. Shogakukan collected its chapters in two tankōbon volumes, which were released on December 27, 2013, and July 30, 2014. Following the suspension of Monthly Ikki, the series continued its publication directly in tankōbon format. The third and final volume was released on January 30, 2019. The manga was licensed in Spain by ECC Ediciones.

=== Volumes ===
No.	Japanese release date	Japanese ISBN
1	December 27, 2013	978-4-09-188640-8
2	July 30, 2014	978-4-09-188659-0
3	January 30, 2019	978-4-09-188679-8
