= Yorukumo =

Japanese manga series

- First tankōbon volume cover

よるくも
- Genre: Horror, romance
- Manga
- Written by: Michi Urushihara
- Published by: Shogakukan
- Imprint: Ikki Comix
- Magazine: Monthly Ikki
- Original run: May 25, 2010 – January 25, 2014
- Volumes: 5

Yorukumo (よるくも) is a Japanese manga series written and illustrated by Michi Urushihara. It was serialized in Shogakukan's seinen manga magazine Monthly Ikki from May 2010 to January 2014, with its chapters collected in four tankōbon volumes.

== Publication ==
Written and illustrated by Michi Urushihara, Yorukumo was serialized in Shogakukan's seinen manga magazine Monthly Ikki from May 25, 2010, to January 25, 2014. Shogakukan collected its chapters in five tankōbon volumes, released from January 28, 2011, to March 28, 2014.

=== Volumes ===
| No. | Japanese release date | Japanese ISBN |
|---|---|---|
| 1 | January 28, 2011 | 978-4-09-188538-8 |
| 2 | October 28, 2011 | 978-4-09-188560-9 |
| 3 | August 30, 2012 | 978-4-09-188598-2 |
| 4 | July 30, 2013 | 978-4-09-188629-3 |
| 5 | March 28, 2014 | 978-4-09-188650-7 |

== See also ==
- Arigoke, another manga series by the same author
