= Shojo Fight =

Japanese manga series

- First tankōbon volume cover, featuring Neri Ooishi

少女ファイト (Shōjo Faito)
- Genre: Sports
- Manga
- Written by: Yoko Nihonbashi
- Published by: Kodansha
- English publisher: NA: Kodansha USA (digital)
- Magazine: Evening (2005–2023); Comic Days (2023–present)
- Original run: December 27, 2005 – present
- Volumes: 18
- Original video animation

Nora Inu-tachi no Odekake
- Directed by: Shunsuke Tada
- Written by: Yoko Nihonbashi
- Music by: Yoshihiro Ike
- Studio: Production I.G
- Released: October 23, 2009
- Runtime: 30 minutes
- icon

Shojo Fight (Japanese: 少女ファイト, Hepburn: Shōjo Faito; lit. 'Girl's Fight') is a Japanese manga series written and illustrated by Yoko Nihonbashi. It was serialized in Kodansha's seinen manga magazine Evening from December 2005 to February 2023, when the magazine ceased its publication, and the series moved to the Comic Days manga app in June of the same year. Its chapters have been collected in 18 tankōbon volumes as of January 2022. An original video animation (OVA) produced by Production I.G was released in October 2009.

== Media ==
=== Manga ===
Written and illustrated by Yoko Nihonbashi, Shojo Fight started in Kodansha's seinen manga magazine Evening on December 27, 2005. In November 2020, it was announced that the manga would enter on a six-month hiatus due to the author's poor health, and resumed on May 11, 2021. Evening ceased its publication on February 28, 2023, and the series moved to Comic Days manga app on June 1 of that same year. Kodansha has collected its chapters into individual tankōbon volumes. The first volume was released on July 21, 2006. As of January 21, 2022, eighteen volumes have been released.

In North America, Kodansha USA has licensed the manga for English digital release in 2017.

==== Volumes ====
No.	Japanese release date	Japanese ISBN
1	July 21, 2006	978-4-06-372171-3
2	February 23, 2007	978-4-06-372262-8
3	September 21, 2007	978-4-06-372351-9
4	April 23, 2008	978-4-06-375476-6; 978-4-06-362110-5 (SE)
5	January 23, 2009	978-4-06-375638-8; 978-4-06-362132-7 (SE)
6	October 23, 2009	978-4-06-375794-1; 978-4-06-358308-3 (SE)
7	July 22, 2010	978-4-06-375944-0; 978-4-06-364836-2 (SE)
8	July 22, 2011	978-4-06-376063-7; 978-4-06-364872-0 (SE)
9	August 23, 2012	978-4-06-376640-0; 978-4-06-364890-4 (SE)
10	July 23, 2013	978-4-06-376861-9; 978-4-06-364926-0 (SE)
11	June 23, 2014	978-4-06-377009-4; 978-4-06-364957-4 (SE)
12	May 22, 2015	978-4-06-377178-7; 978-4-06-362294-2 (SE)
13	May 23, 2016	978-4-06-377465-8; 978-4-06-362330-7 (SE)
14	July 21, 2017	978-4-06-393235-5; 978-4-06-362373-4 (SE)
15	August 23, 2018	978-4-06-512375-1; 978-4-06-512861-9 (SE)
16	September 20, 2019	978-4-06-517221-6; 978-4-06-517222-3 (SE)
17	July 22, 2020	978-4-06-517221-6; 978-4-06-520262-3 (SE)
18	January 21, 2022	978-4-06-525927-6; 978-4-06-527007-3 (SE)

=== Original video animation ===
An original video animation (OVA), titled Nora Inu-tachi no Odekake (少女ファイト 野良犬たちのおでかけ; "The Origin of the Stray Dogs"), produced by Production I.G, directed by Shunsuke Tada and scripted by the manga's author, Yoko Nihonbashi, was bundled with the special edition of the sixth manga volume, released on October 23, 2009.

== Reception ==
Shojo Fight was one of the Jury Recommended Works at the 13th Japan Media Arts Festival in 2009.

== See also ==
- G Senjō Heaven's Door, another manga series by the same author
