= Nickelodeon (manga) =

Japanese manga series

- First volume cover

ニッケルオデオン (Nikkeruodeon)
- Manga
- Written by: Seiman Douman
- Published by: Shogakukan
- Imprint: Ikki Comix
- Magazine: Monthly Ikki
- Original run: September 25, 2010 – August 25, 2014
- Volumes: 3
- icon

Nickelodeon (Japanese: ニッケルオデオン, Hepburn: Nikkeruodeon) is a Japanese anthology manga series written and illustrated by Seiman Douman. It was serialized in Shogakukan's seinen manga magazine Monthly Ikki from September 2010 to August 2014, with its chapters collected in three tankōbon volumes.

== Publication ==
Nickelodeon is written and illustrated by Seiman Douman. It is an anthology collection of 39 stories that span a wide range of genres. It was serialized in Shogakukan's seinen manga magazine Monthly Ikki from September 25, 2010, to August 25, 2014. Shogakukan collected the chapters in three tankōbon volumes, released from January 30, 2012, to September 30, 2014.

=== Volumes ===
No.	Japanese release date	Japanese ISBN
1	January 30, 2012	978-4-09-188564-7
2	February 20, 2013	978-4-09-188616-3
3	September 30, 2014	978-4-09-188663-7

== Reception ==
Nickelodeon was one of the Jury Recommended Works at the 18th Japan Media Arts Festival in 2014.

== See also ==
- How Many Light-Years to Babylon?, another manga series by the same author
- The Voynich Hotel, another manga series by the same author
