= Tsukidate no Satsujin =

Japanese manga series

- First volume cover

月館の殺人
- Genre: Murder mystery
- Manga
- Written by: Yukito Ayatsuji
- Illustrated by: Noriko Sasaki
- Published by: Shogakukan
- Imprint: Ikki Comix
- Magazine: Monthly Ikki
- Original run: December 25, 2004 – April 25, 2006
- Volumes: 2
- icon

Tsukidate no Satsujin (月館の殺人; lit. 'Murder in Tsukidate') is a Japanese manga series written by Yukito Ayatsuji and illustrated by Noriko Sasaki. It was serialized in Shogakukan's seinen manga magazine Monthly Ikki from December 2004 to April 2006, with its chapters collected in two wideban volumes.

== Synopsis ==
After the death of her parents, high school student Sorami Karigaya boards the night train Genya to meet her estranged grandfather, her only remaining relative. Her journey is filled with firsts: her first train ride, her first time seeing snow, and her first visit to Hokkaido. Awaiting her on board, however, is a group of eccentric and obsessive railway enthusiasts, known as "Tetsu". The luxurious Genya train, which utilizes former Orient Express carriages pulled by the D51 steam locomotive, contains only seven passengers. Sorami soon discovers her grandfather personally invited all of them. This peculiar gathering takes a sinister turn when a passenger is found murdered aboard the moving train, abruptly dragging Sorami into a brutal and terrifying mystery.

== Publication ==
Written by Yukito Ayatsuji and illustrated by Noriko Sasaki, Tsukidate no Satsujin was serialized in Shogakukan's seinen manga magazine Monthly Ikki from December 25, 2004, to April 25, 2006. (Note: It finished in the magazine's June 2006 issue (cover date), released on April 25 of that same year.) Shogakukan collected its chapters in two wideban volumes, released on August 10, 2005, and July 28, 2006. Shogakukan re-published it in two tankōbon volumes released on January 30, 2009. Shogakukan re-published it again in two bunkoban volumes on January 13, 2017.

=== Volumes ===
No.	Japanese release date	Japanese ISBN
1	August 10, 2005	978-4-09-188581-4
2	July 28, 2006	978-4-09-188333-9

== Reception ==
Tsukidate no Satsujin was one of the Jury Recommended Works at the 10th Japan Media Arts Festival in 2006.
