= Harue Oyama McVay =

Hawaiian ceramist (born 1928)

Harue Oyama McVay (born 1928) is a ceramist born in Honolulu, Hawaii. While growing up, she had the opportunity to watch the landscape painter D. Howard Hitchcock (1861–1943), who rented his studio from the Oyama family. As an undergraduate at the University of Hawaii, she enrolled in a ceramics class taught by Claude Horan. She graduated from the university in 1950 and earned an MA from Ohio State University in 1951. She taught at the University of Hawaii from 1951 until 1993, when she retired as a professor emeritus.

McVay is best known for starting with wheel thrown clay and then manipulating it, often into organic forms.

The Hawaii State Art Museum, the Honolulu Museum of Art, the Museum of Arts and Design (New York City), and the Smithsonian American Art Museum are among the public collections holding work by Harue Oyama McVay.

== Exhibitions ==
She has also been in several group exhibitions.

- Art Hawaii 1978

== Sources ==
- Morse, Marcia (2001). Legacy : facets of island modernism. Honolulu: Honolulu Academy of Arts. pp. 58–63. ISBN 9780937426487. OCLC 50993176.
- Wisnosky, John; Klobe, Tom (2002). A tradition of excellence. Dept. of Art, University of Hawai`i at Manoa. pp. 84–87. OCLC 49661693.
