= Kingyo Used Books =

Japanese manga series by Seimu Yoshizaki

- First volume cover

金魚屋古書店 (Kingyoya Koshoten)
- Genre: Comedy; Slice of life
- Manga

Kingyoya Koshoten Suitouchō
- Written by: Seimu Yoshizaki
- Published by: Shōnen Gahōsha; Shogakukan
- Imprint: Young King Comics; Ikki Comix (re-issue)
- Magazine: OURs Girl; OURs Lite
- Original run: 2000 – 2002
- Volumes: 2
- Manga
- Written by: Seimu Yoshizaki
- Published by: Shogakukan
- English publisher: NA: Viz Media
- Imprint: Ikki Comix
- Magazine: Monthly Ikki (2004−2014)
- Original run: March 25, 2004 – June 30, 2020
- Volumes: 17
- icon

Kingyo Used Books (Japanese: 金魚屋古書店, Hepburn: Kingyoya Koshoten) is a Japanese manga series written and illustrated by Seimu Yoshizaki. It follows the events that unfold at a small used manga store that specializes in old and obscure manga. A first series, titled Kingyoya Koshoten Suitouchō, was published in Shōnen Gahōsha's Young King OURs's special editions OURs Girl and OURs Lite from 2000 to 2002, with its chapters collected in two volumes. Kingyo Used Books was serialized in Shogakukan seinen manga magazine Monthly Ikki from 2004 to 2014, when the magazine ceased its publication. The series continued only through compiled tankōbon volumes, with the 17th and final one released in 2020. Kingyo Used Books was licensed for English release in North America by Viz Media; only the first four volumes were released.

== Plot ==
The series takes place on a used manga shop, featuring vignette-style segments focused on various characters. It highlights the significance of manga in daily life and includes references to both popular and obscure titles, from the widely known Dr. Slump to the lesser-known Billy Puck.

== Publication ==
Manga author Seimu Yoshizaki first launched a series titled Kingyoya Koshoten Suitouchō (金魚屋古書店出納帳), which was published in Shōnen Gahōsha's Young King OURs's special editions OURs Girl and OURs Lite from 2000 to 2002. Two volumes were published on April 3 and June 26, 2003. Both volumes were re-released by Shogakukan on December 24, 2004.

Kingyo Used Books was serialized in Shogakukan's seinen manga magazine Monthly Ikki from March 25, 2004, to September 25, 2014, when the magazine ceased publication. The series was then continued via compiled volumes. The chapters were collected in 17 tankōbon volumes, released from December 24, 2004, to July 30, 2020.

In North America, the series was licensed for English release by Viz Media and debuted on Monthly Ikki's English website Sigikki on July 30, 2009. Only four volumes were released from April 20, 2010, to October 18, 2011.

=== Volumes ===
No.	Original release date	Original ISBN	English release date	English ISBN
1	December 24, 2004	978-4-09-188553-1	April 20, 2010	978-1-4215-3362-9
"The Components of Memory"; "Hokusai Manga"; "Far Away"; "The Boy Detective Arrives"; "A Country Without Manga"; "Fujiomi-Kun"; "The Sedori Business"; "Billy and Grandpa's Curious Travelogue"
2	August 30, 2005	978-4-09-188554-8	October 19, 2010	978-1-4215-3366-7
"His View"; "Yes or No"; "The Other Side of the Window"; "A Bundle of Papers"; "Dad Again"; "One Percent Man"; "Star Traveler"; "I Want to Be Happy"
3	March 30, 2006	978-4-09-188315-5	April 19, 2011	978-1-4215-3367-4
4	March 30, 2006	978-4-09-188346-9	October 18, 2011	978-1-4215-3368-1
5	May 30, 2007	978-4-09-188365-0	—	—
6	December 26, 2007	978-4-09-188390-2	—	—
7	July 30, 2008	978-4-09-188420-6	—	—
8	January 30, 2009	978-4-09-188439-8	—	—
9	September 30, 2009	978-4-09-188477-0	—	—
10	April 28, 2010	978-4-09-188515-9	—	—
11	November 30, 2010	978-4-09-188332-2	—	—
12	June 30, 2011	978-4-09-188549-4	—	—
13	February 29, 2012	978-4-09-188574-6	—	—
14	December 27, 2012	978-4-09-188610-1	—	—
15	November 29, 2013	978-4-09-188637-8	—	—
16	July 30, 2014	978-4-09-188660-6	—	—
17	June 30, 2020	978-4-09-188699-6	—	—

== Reception ==
Kingyo Used Books received an honorable mention in the 2010 Publishers Weekly comics critics poll. It was one of the Jury Recommended Works at the 16th Japan Media Arts Festival in 2012.

Carlo Santos in his Anime News Network column "Right Turn Only" gave the manga's first volume a grade of "B", saying that "if you want to get a non-manga fan into manga, this is probably not the manga to give them." Santos argued that "Kingyo is, if anything, too fixated on giving history lessons, trying to drown the reader in footnotes and details rather than letting the series speak for itself."

Jamais Jochim of Portland Book Review lauded Yoshizaki's storytelling, noting the importance of manga and how memories define people. Jochim described the art as good and more realistic than that of most manga. He characterized the stories as vignettes that emphasize how people draw power from connections. Jochim concluded that the book is suited for readers who assume that manga is only for kids or who need to relax. School Library Journal's review of the first volume praised Yoshizaki's artwork, but recommended the "meta-manga" for older, established readers, rather than young adults expecting an action story. Reviewing the third volume for Otaku USA, Danica Davidson wrote that the manga's "classy" and "artsy" tone helped it overcome a simple, singular focus and "languid" pacing.
