= I (manga) =

Japanese manga series

- First volume cover

I【アイ】 (Ai)
- Manga
- Written by: Mikio Igarashi
- Published by: Shogakukan
- Imprint: Ikki Comix
- Magazine: Monthly Ikki
- Original run: June 25, 2010 – June 25, 2013
- Volumes: 3
- icon

I (Japanese: アイ, Hepburn: Ai) is a Japanese manga series written and illustrated by Mikio Igarashi. It was serialized in Shogakukan's Monthly Ikki from June 2010 to June 2013, with its chapters collected in three wideban volumes.

== Publication ==
I is written and illustrated by Mikio Igarashi. It was serialized in Shogakukan's Monthly Ikki from June 25, 2010, to June 25, 2013. Shogakukan collected its chapters in three wideban volumes, released from July 29, 2011, to August 30, 2013.

=== Volumes ===
No.	Japanese release date	Japanese ISBN
1	July 29, 2011	978-4-09-188555-5
2	June 29, 2012	978-4-09-188586-9
3	August 30, 2013	978-4-09-188631-6

== Reception ==
Along with Hozuki's Coolheadedness, I ranked 19th on Kono Manga ga Sugoi! 2012's Top 10 Manga for Male Readers. It was nominated for the 16th, 17th and 18th Tezuka Osamu Cultural Prizes in 2012, 2013 and 2014, respectively.
