= How Many Light-Years to Babylon? =

Japanese manga series

- Volume cover

バビロンまでは何光年? (Babiron made wa Nankōnen?)
- Genre: Science fiction
- Manga
- Written by: Seiman Douman
- Published by: Akita Shoten
- English publisher: NA: Seven Seas Entertainment
- Magazine: Young Champion Retsu
- Original run: January 17, 2017 – July 16, 2019
- Volumes: 1

How Many Light-Years to Babylon? (Japanese: バビロンまでは何光年?, Hepburn: Babiron made wa Nankōnen?) is a Japanese manga written by Seiman Douman. It was serialized in Young Champion Retsu from January 2017 to July 2019 and published in a single volume in September 2019.

== Publication ==
Written and illustrated by Seiman Douman, the series began serialization in Young Champion Retsu on January 17, 2017. The series completed its serialization on July 16, 2019. The individual chapters were collected into a single tankōbon volume, which was released on September 19, 2019.

In April 2020, Seven Seas Entertainment announced they licensed the series for English publication. They released the volume on December 1, 2020.

== Reception ==
Grant Jones from Anime News Network praised the plot due to its balancing of its elements, while also feeling it can be aimless at points. Jones also felt the story was too short to delve into some of its aspects.

In 2020, the series won the Seiun Award for best comic.

== See also ==
- Nickelodeon, another manga series by the same author
- The Voynich Hotel, another manga series by the same author
