= Natsu no Kumo =

Japanese manga series

- Cover of the first volume

ナツノクモ Spinning Web
- Manga
- Written by: Rokuro Shinofusa
- Published by: Shogakukan
- Imprint: Ikki Comix
- Magazine: Monthly Ikki
- Original run: September 25, 2003 – March 24, 2007
- Volumes: 8
- icon

Natsu no Kumo: Spinning Web (Japanese: ナツノクモ Spinning Web; lit. 'Summer Spider: Spinning Web') is a Japanese manga series written and illustrated by Rokuro Shinofusa. It was serialized in Shogakukan's Monthly Ikki from September 2003 to March 2007, with its chapters collected in eight tankōbon volumes.

== Plot ==
In an alternate future, immersive online worlds are a dominant facet of society. To counteract the severe accidents caused by users violating mandatory playtime quotas, specialized doctors are integrated into the game to monitor and counsel the population.

A high-level player, Coil, operates within this system. Living in isolation after his family was hospitalized, he sells his services to organizations seeking order. Coil utilizes a secondary robotic avatar, the Engineman, to permanently eliminate other players through torture and deletion.

== Publication ==
Natsu no Kumo is written and illustrated by Rokuro Shinofusa. It was serialized in Shogakukan's Monthly Ikki from September 25, 2003, to March 24, 2007. Shogakukan collected its chapters in eight tankōbon volumes, released from May 28, 2004, to January 30, 2008.

=== Volumes ===
No.	Japanese release date	Japanese ISBN
1	May 28, 2004	978-4-09-188481-7
2	July 30, 2004	978-4-09-188482-4
3	February 4, 2005	978-4-09-188483-1
4	May 30, 2005	978-4-09-188484-8
5	November 30, 2005	978-4-09-188485-5
6	May 30, 2006	978-4-09-188320-9
7	October 30, 2006	978-4-09-188337-7
8	January 30, 2008	978-4-09-188397-1
