= Noramimi =

Japanese manga series

- First tankōbon volume cover

のらみみ
- Genre: Comedy
- Manga
- Written by: Kazuo Hara
- Published by: Shogakukan
- Imprint: Ikki Comix
- Magazine: Monthly Ikki
- Original run: December 25, 2002 – August 25, 2009
- Volumes: 8
- Anime television series
- Directed by: Yoshitaka Koyama
- Written by: Makoto Nakamura
- Music by: Kou Nakagawa
- Studio: TMS Entertainment
- Original network: CBC, TBS, Tokyo MX
- Original run: January 9, 2008 – December 17, 2008
- Episodes: 24
- icon

Noramimi (のらみみ) is a Japanese manga series written and illustrated by Kazuo Hara. It was serialized in Shogakukan's seinen manga magazine Monthly Ikki from December 2002 to August 2009, with its chapters collected in eight tankōbon volumes. A 24-episode anime television series produced by TMS Entertainment aired for two seasons from January to December 2008.

== Characters ==
Noramimi (のらみみ)
Voiced by: Nanae Katō
Toshio Handa (半田 トシオ, Handa Toshio)
Voiced by: Minoru Shiraishi
Tomagome (トマゴメ)
Voiced by: Tomomichi Nishimura
Sarashina (更科)
Voiced by: Tomoe Hanba
Naomi Ginkakuji (銀閣寺 ナオミ, Ginkakuji Naomi)
Voiced by: Eri Nakao
Cinnamon (シナモン, Shinamon)
Voiced by: Eri Kitamura
Dottari-kun (ドッタリ君)
Voiced by: Chie Kōjiro

== Media ==
=== Manga ===
Written and illustrated by Kazuo Hara, Noramimi was serialized in Shogakukan's Monthly Ikki (Note: The series began in the last issue of Spirits Zōkan Ikki, re-branded Monthly Ikki in 2003.) from December 25, 2002, to August 25, 2009. An additional chapter was published on October 24, 2009. Shogakukan collected its chapters in eight tankōbon volumes, released from November 29, 2003, to October 30, 2009.

=== Anime ===
An anime television series adaptation was announced by Monthly Ikki in July 2007. It was produced by TMS Entertainment and the first season was broadcast for 12 episodes on CBC, TBS and Tokyo MX from January 9 to March 26, 2008. The second season was broadcast for 12 episodes from October 1 to December 17, 2008.

== Reception ==
The anime series adaptation was one of the Jury Recommended Works at the 12th Japan Media Arts Festival in 2008.
