= Hakai (manga) =

Japanese manga series

- Hakai: Uri Geller-san, Anata no Kao wa Iikagen Wasurete Shimaimashita
- Volume cover

破戒 ~ユリ・ゲラーさん、あなたの顔はいいかげん忘れてしまいました~ (Hakai Yuri Gerā-san, Anata no Kao wa Iikagen Wasurete Shimaimashita)
- Manga
- Written by: Suzuki Matsuo
- Illustrated by: Naoki Yamamoto
- Published by: Shogakukan
- Imprint: Ikki Comix
- Magazine: Monthly Ikki
- Original run: April 24, 2004 – October 25, 2004
- Volumes: 1

Hakai: Uri Geller-san, Anata no Kao wa Iikagen Wasurete Shimaimashita (Japanese: 破戒 ~ユリ・ゲラーさん、あなたの顔はいいかげん忘れてしまいました~, Hepburn: Hakai Yuri Gerā-san, Anata no Kao wa Iikagen Wasurete Shimaimashita), also known as The Broken Commandment, is a Japanese manga series written by Suzuki Matsuo and illustrated by Naoki Yamamoto. It was serialized in Shogakukan's seinen manga magazine Monthly Ikki from April to October 2004, with its chapters collected in a single volume.

== Publication ==
Written by Suzuki Matsuo and illustrated by Naoki Yamamoto, Hakai was serialized in Shogakukan's seinen manga magazine Monthly Ikki from April 24 to October 25, 2004. Shogakukan collected its chapters in a single volume released on February 28, 2005. The manga was reissued by East Press and released on November 17, 2016.

It has been licensed in France by Atelier Akatombo.
