= Isami Enomoto =

- Died: February 16, 2016
- Education: University of Hawaiʻi at Mānoa, University of Hawaiʻi at Hilo
- Occupation: Ceramist

Isami Enomoto (May 17, 1929 – February 16, 2016) was a ceramicist from Hawaii. He is best known for his labor murals, which are on display at the University of Hawaiʻi at West Oʻahu library.

== Career ==
Enomoto was born on May 17, 1929, in Hilo, Hawaii. He studied commercial art at the University of Hawaiʻi at Mānoa and while completing his degree was told to take a ceramics class from "Horan" where he met Claude Horan. Having never been exposed to working with clay he fell in love with the medium and changed his major to ceramics. While finishing graduate school, Enomoto became burdened by the guilt of being in college while his close childhood friend from Hilo had survived the Korean War and told the harrowing experience of combat. Enomoto had completed all of his graduate work but decided to enlist in the United States Army and never completed his masters degree. While in basic training at Fort Ord in San Francisco, he met his wife Zora Kagawa through mutual friends from Hawaii who were living and working in San Francisco. Together they moved to Frankfurt Germany where Enomoto worked as a map maker in the topography unit of the US Army. He would later apply some of the lithography skills in his ceramics work. After being discharged from the army, they returned to Hawaii and eventually Enomoto would join his former professor, Claude Horan at Ceramics Hawaii. He then bought the company when Horan decided to return to teaching in 1957. Ceramics Hawaii Ltd. till about the mid-1970s did custom commercial work ranging from ashtrays, lamp bases and planters to large murals for local architects and interior designers. Enomoto said that some of his best work was for the City and County of Honolulu Parks and Recreation where he designed and created signage for local playgrounds and men and women's bathroom signs. During the economic crash of the 70's commissions dried up and Ceramics Hawaii turned to becoming a retail operation of materials and equipment with a few commissions with Jean Charlot the last being a statue for Maryknoll School of a Madonna and Child which was the last work of both Ceramics Hawaii and Jean Charlot. Enomoto worked with Vladimir Ossipoff on the wall tiles in the International Concourse of the Honolulu Airport, and with Jean Charlot on the murals on the United Public Works building in Honolulu. He operated Ceramics Hawaii until his death on February 16, 2016. The business closed shortly thereafter, on April 30.

== Labor murals ==
"Building and Construction", the third mural in Isami Enomoto's series of labor murals.

In 1960, the Bank of Hawaii built a new branch in Kapahulu, a district in Honolulu. They commissioned a mural for the wall above the teller counter. Enomoto was selected because the Ceramics Hawaii Studio was in the same neighborhood as the bank, making a local connection. He made five 6-foot tall murals that were 45 feet long when lined up depicting scenes of commerce, agriculture, transportation, and labor in Hawaii. The ceramic murals were mounted on plywood reinforced by steel channels. The largest section weighed 650 pounds. They were in a style similar to the public works projects created during the Great Depression.

In 2015, the Bank of Hawaii decided to close the Kapahulu branch. The bank did not want to keep the murals, and local art museums could not accept such large, heavy pieces. Docomo Hawaii managed and stored the pieces until a new home was found for them. They donated the murals to the University of Hawaii, West Oahu's Center for Labor Education and Research (CLEAR) in 2017, after $50,000 was raised to install the piece. The Hawaii Historic Foundation awarded CLEAR's director, William Puette, a Preservation Honor Award for their efforts to preserve and re-home the pieces.
