= Enomoto: New Elements that Shake the World =

Manga series

- Cover of volume 1, showing the main characters Gosuke and Michiro Maeda

えの素
- Genre: Comedy
- Manga
- Written by: Shunji Enomoto
- Published by: Kodansha
- Magazine: Weekly Morning
- Original run: 1997 – 2003
- Volumes: 9

Enomoto: New Elements that Shake the World (Japanese: えの素) is a Japanese manga series written and illustrated by Shunji Enomoto. It was serialized in Kodansha's Weekly Morning magazine from 1997 to 2003, and compiled in nine volumes. The series centers on the exploits of the shameless and irresponsible salaryman Gosuke Maeda (前田 郷介, Maeda Gōsuke), his equally unhinged preadolescent son Michiro (前田 みちろう, Maeda Michirou), and various depraved co-workers, including the obsessive voyeur and exhibitionist Masakazu Tamura (田村 政和, Tamura Masakazu) and the unsmiling closet dominatrix Midori Kuzuhara (葛原 緑, Kuzuhara Midori). It contains a large amount of scatological and sexual humor.

== Volumes ==
- Volume 1 (ISBN 4-06-337343-6)
- Volume 2 (ISBN 4-06-337360-6)
- Volume 3 (ISBN 4-06-337380-0)
- Volume 4 (ISBN 4-06-337402-5)
- Volume 5 (ISBN 4-06-337427-0)
- Volume 6 (ISBN 4-06-337483-1)
- Volume 7 (ISBN 4-06-337511-0)
- Volume 8 (ISBN 4-06-337523-4)
- Volume 9 (ISBN 4-06-337529-3)

All volumes above published by Kodansha.

A tribute volume, Enomoto Tribute: Shunji Enomoto and Pleasant People (ISBN 4-06-372231-7), featuring interpretations of Enomoto's characters by other cartoonists (including Moebius), was released by MouRa in 2006.

== International ==
The series has not been translated into English. Its main source of exposure among English-speaking audiences was an enthusiastic 2001 review by Highwater Books publisher Tom Devlin in The Comics Journal. Devlin marveled at Enomoto's ability to "make innovative comics that are almost entirely concerned with bodily functions," and suggested that it was "entirely unnecessary" to know what the characters were saying to appreciate the series: "Just imagine that every time someone opens their mouth, they scream 'Aaaaaaaaaaaaah!'." Enomoto: New Elements that Shake the World has also been praised by the alternative comics creators Tom Hart and James Kochalka.

Portions of the series have been translated into Italian and Spanish.
