= Enomoto Seifu =

Japanese poet

Enomoto Seifu (榎本 星布; 1732–1815) was a well known haiku poet. She was born into a samurai's family and received a good education. On becoming a widow she first mastered her poetic arts under the guidance of Kaya Shirao and then, following his death, she became a nun. Her poems were published after her death by her son as the collected haika verses of the nun Seifu. Yamamoto Kenichi has claimed she is the only pre-modern female poet to have left truly outstanding work.
