= Levius (manga) =

Japanese manga series

- Cover of the first manga volume

レビウス (Rebiusu)
- Genre: Dystopian; Martial arts; Steampunk
- Manga
- Written by: Haruhisa Nakata
- Published by: Shogakukan (former); Shueisha (current)
- English publisher: NA: Viz Media
- Imprint: Ikki Comix; (Shogakukan); Young Jump Comics; (Shueisha)
- Magazine: Monthly Ikki
- Original run: December 25, 2012 – September 25, 2014
- Volumes: 3 (original); 2 (reprint)
- Manga

Levius/est
- Written by: Haruhisa Nakata
- Published by: Shueisha
- English publisher: NA: Viz Media
- Imprint: Young Jump Comics
- Magazine: Ultra Jump
- Original run: April 18, 2015 – June 18, 2021
- Volumes: 10
- Original net animation
- Directed by: Hiroyuki Seshita (Note: Chief Director (総監督)); Keisuke Ide
- Produced by: Ryou Nakaoka
- Written by: Hiroshi Seko (Note: Series Composition (シリーズ構成) and Screenplay (脚本)); Kenta Ihara (Note: Screenplay (脚本))
- Music by: Yugo Kanno
- Studio: Polygon Pictures
- Licensed by: Netflix (streaming); NA: Viz Media (home video)
- Released: November 28, 2019
- Episodes: 12
- icon

Levius (Japanese: レビウス, Hepburn: Rebiusu) is a Japanese manga series written and illustrated by Haruhisa Nakata. The series was published in Shogakukan's Monthly Ikki from December 2012 to September 2014, when the magazine ceased publication. Shogakukan compiled its chapters into three tankōbon volumes. A sequel, titled Levius/est, was serialized in Shueisha's Ultra Jump from April 2015 to June 2021. The manga and its sequel are licensed in North America by Viz Media. A 12-episode original net animation (ONA) adaptation produced by Polygon Pictures premiered on Netflix in November 2019.

== Story ==
In the 19th century, Imperial City is heavily damaged in a war. A new sport known as "Metalboxing" (which combines the elements of boxing with robotic elements) is developed five years later. Levius Cromwell, who lost his father during the war, begins to emerge as a young fighter and begins training under his uncle Zacks Cromwell after losing his consciousness. Levius works up the boxing ranks until he finally reaches his goal, which is an opportunity to challenge for the promotion to Grade I, which is the highest rank any boxer could achieve. Levius was required to defeat Hugo Stratus to achieve that rank, but Hugo was unexpectedly defeated by a mysterious boxer named A.J. Langdon. The dignity of human beings and the future of Imperial City are in the hands of an ongoing battle between Levius and his opponents.

== Characters ==
Levius Cromwell (レビウス ・クロムウェル, Rebiusu Kuromuueru)
Voiced by: Nobunaga Shimazaki (Japanese); Zach Aguilar (English)
Levius is a young boxer who is notable in the sport of "Metalboxing". He deeply cares about the whereabouts of his mother, who fell unconscious during the war. He was required to amputate his right arm (which was replaced with a robotic arm) before the events of the manga due to corrosion after being attacked by an automated object.
Zacks Cromwell (ザクス ・クロムウェル, Zakusu Kuromuueru)
Voiced by: Junichi Suwabe (Japanese); Sean Burgos (English)
Zacks is Levius' uncle; he suffers from congenital tetrachromatic abnormality in his left eye, requiring him to wear an eyepatch over it. He also acts as Levius' trainer due to his previous experience as a regular boxer.
Natalia Garnet (ナタリア・ ガーネット, Nataria Gānetto)
Voiced by: Ayane Sakura (Japanese); Julia McIlvaine (English)
Natalia is a Grade III boxer who trains at Zacks Gym. She offers some advice to Levius about his upcoming matches.
A.J. Langdon (A.J.ラングドン, Ei-Jei Rangudon)
Voiced by: Saori Hayami (Japanese); Christine Marie Cabanos (English)
A member of the Amethyst military corporation, A.J. is the youngest soldier who fought in the war. She was not expected to be Levius' opponent in his Grade II promotion match; however, she defeated Hugo Stratus in a controversial fashion. After that match, she attacked Levius, which created a steam explosion that caused him to seek medical treatment.

== Media ==
=== Manga ===
Levius is written and illustrated by Haruhisa Nakata. Unlike most manga series, which are read from right to left, Levius is read from left to right. The manga was serialized in Shogakukan's Monthly Ikki from December 25, 2012, to September 25, 2014, until the magazine ceased its publication. The last issue announced that the series would continue serialization, but details were not given then. Shogakukan collected its chapters in three tankōbon volumes, released from January 30 to December 26, 2014. Shueisha republished the series in two volumes under the Young Jump Comics imprint on April 19 and May 17, 2019.

A sequel, titled Levius/est, was serialized in Shueisha's Ultra Jump from April 18, 2015, to June 18, 2021. Shueisha collected its chapters in ten tankōbon volumes, released from December 18, 2015, to August 18, 2021.

In North America, Viz Media announced the English language release of the manga in February 2019. Levius was released in a single omnibus volume on September 17, 2019. Viz Media began publishing Levius/est on November 19, 2019.

==== Levius ====
No.	Original release date	Original ISBN	English release date	English ISBN
1	January 30, 2014	978-4-09-188644-6	September 17, 2019	978-1-9747-0502-3
2	April 30, 2014	978-4-09-188652-1	September 17, 2019	978-1-9747-0502-3
3	December 26, 2014	978-4-09-188672-9	September 17, 2019	978-1-9747-0502-3

==== Levius/est ====
No.	Original release date	Original ISBN	English release date	English ISBN
1	December 18, 2015	978-4-08-890278-4	November 19, 2019	978-1-9747-0639-6
2	June 17, 2016	978-4-08-890463-4	January 21, 2020	978-1-9747-0640-2
3	January 19, 2017	978-4-08-890581-5	March 17, 2020	978-1-9747-0641-9
4	August 18, 2017	978-4-08-890731-4	May 19, 2020	978-1-9747-1237-3
5	April 19, 2018	978-4-08-890899-1	June 21, 2020	978-1-9747-1238-0
6	June 19, 2019	978-4-08-891302-5	September 15, 2020	978-1-9747-1491-9
7	November 19, 2019	978-4-08-891406-0	December 15, 2020	978-1-9747-1712-5
8	July 17, 2020	978-4-08-891586-9	May 18, 2021	978-1-9747-2287-7
9	December 18, 2020	978-4-08-891750-4	December 21, 2021	978-1-9747-2522-9
10	August 18, 2021	978-4-08-892057-3	August 16, 2022	978-1-9747-3013-1

=== Original net animation ===
A 12-episode original net animation (ONA) adaptation, produced by Polygon Pictures premiered worldwide on Netflix on November 28, 2019. The opening theme is "Wit and Love" and the ending theme is "Child Dancer"; both songs were performed by Nazome. The series was later broadcast in Japan on Tokyo MX and BS11 from January 9 to March 27, 2021. For the televised version, Nana Mizuki performed the series opening theme "Link or Chains", while Mamoru Miyano performed the ending theme "Beautiful Doll".

Viz Media released the series on Blu-ray in North America on March 21, 2023.

==== Episodes ====
No.	Title	Original release date
1	"All of the Impact Ends Up Here"	November 28, 2019
Despite his relative youth as a metal boxer, Levius Cromwell has been racking up victories in the ring thanks to his special move: a spinning punch that puts too much pressure on his prosthetic arm. Levius' reliance on his special move has his uncle and personal trainer, Zacks, concerned. Zacks believes that relying too much on this move could leave Levius injured and wide open to an enemy attack and tells Levius to stop using it. Levius continues to use the move, however, and wins his latest match with it, causing Zacks to remember a conversation with Levius' grandmother, who tells him that perhaps Levius is using metal boxing to find something he lost long ago.
2	"Does it Seem Like the Boy is Getting On Okay?"	November 28, 2019
Years ago, the Fosanian Conflict hit Greenbridge, Levius' hometown, and Levius attempted to rescue his mother, who was still in the hospital. On his way to the hospital, Levius saw a girl be kidnapped by mechanical soldiers. When he found his mother, the hospital collapsed around them. Levius' mother was rendered comatose, and Levius' right arm was incinerated, causing him to be placed under the care of Zacks. Sometime later, Levius caught a glimpse of the girl he saw in the day of the attack and followed her to a metal boxing stadium. Levius was inspired to become a metal boxer, with Zacks becoming his personal trainer and convincing his friend Bill Wyneberg to become Levius' technician. Early in his career, Levius defeated Natalia Garnet, who was impressed by Levius' skills and declared him to be her rival. In the present, Zacks gets a letter from the metal boxing association announcing Levius' next opponent: Malcolm Eden, a fighter who has killed every one of his opponents.
3	"How in the World Did That Thing Pass as an Elbow Guard?"	November 28, 2019
Despite Zacks' protests, Levius insists on fighting Malcolm, so Zack and Natalia decide to train him to predict and dodge Malcolm's aggressive moves. Natalia also agrees to support Levius from his corner at the ring and Bill teaches her about Agartha, the mysterious water that powers the prosthetics and implants used in metal boxing. According to Bill, the discovery of Agartha water led to the Fosanian Conflict, the war that caused the death of Levius' father. Bill is also able to modify Levius' prosthetic so that it can withstand several consecutive spinning punches. As the match begins, Malcolm immediately uses moves that draw blood from Levius and throw him to the ground.
4	"He... He's The Real Thing..."	November 28, 2019
Despite Levius' best efforts, Malcolm manages to land every single punch he throws and Levius barely survives two rounds against him. Fortunately, Zacks discovers that the key of Malcolm's fighting style lies in his footwork, which he uses to redirect his blows through a technique called "sidewinder". Levius is able to exhaust Malcolm with a sidewinder of his own till round 6, in which both fighters reach their limits. During the fight, Malcolm remembers his glory days as a metal boxer, until he was demoted and ignored by the media, causing him to become more aggressive in his fighting. Even his own daughter grew increasingly concerned for Malcolm's well-being. Levius ultimately defeats Malcolm, who retires from metal boxing, reconciles with his daughter and opens up a charity program for injured veterans. Sometime later, Zacks gets a letter from the International Metal Boxing Association, in which Levius is scheduled for a promotion bout against Hugo Stratus.
5	"Do I Look Like an Idiot Who Thinks about Losing Before a Fight?"	November 28, 2019
Bill grows suspicious that the first promotion bout in three years was given to Levius, who is only ranked 7th in Grade III's official rankings. Hugo goes to Zack's Gym and provokes Levius for no reason other than to make their upcoming fight interesting. Before the promotion match, however, Hugo is scheduled to fight an up-and-coming fighter named AJ Langdon. During the fight, Hugo attacks with superior striking power, but AJ dodges his punches and even draws blood from him. Levius takes a look at AJ's equipment and sees the same mark he saw on the mechanical soldiers that invaded Greenbridge when he was a child.
6	"She Called Out for My Help"	November 28, 2019
According to Bill, the mark on AJ's equipment belongs to Amethyst, a business conglomerate involved in the Fosanian Conflict and multiple Agartha-drilling operations all over the world. As the fight continues, Hugo is driven to the point of exhaustion and AJ gains the upper hand through superior speed. AJ changes her rhythm and relentlessly attacks Hugo, to the point she even knocks out the referee. Levius is forced to barge into the ring and prevents AJ from killing Hugo, until he realizes that AJ is the same girl kidnapped by Amethyst years ago. After the fight, Hugo's father, Raymond, asks Bill for help in saving Hugo, who has been left with injuries to his spinal cord and may never be able to fight again. The international metal boxing association switches Levius' promotion bout from Hugo to AJ, but Zacks wants to call the match off because he is concerned for Levius' safety. Levius wants to visit AJ, revealing that he saw her during the attack in his hometown, and Raymond makes arrangements for a visit to AJ's home.
7	"We Met Before... Do You Remember?"	November 28, 2019
Thanks to Raymond, Levius and his friends secure a visit to the mansion of Dr. Rudolph Clown, AJ's legal guardian. Once there, Raymond furiously confronts Clown, accusing him to arranging a match between Hugo and AJ just to show off AJ's skills and equipment and even threatening him at gunpoint. AJ easily incapacitates Raymond until Levius attempts to remind her of the time he saw her during the attack on Greenbridge. AJ continuously denies having met Levius and Clown says that he rescued AJ from the ruins of Greenbridge and now she lives happily with him. Noticing AJ's visible sadness, Levius proclaims he will save AJ from Clown, who proposes a deal. Should Levius win the promotion bout, AJ will be released; if Levius loses, however, he will be placed under the care of Clown. Levius agrees to the deal and begins his training for the promotion bout. Meanwhile, Bill works to improve Levius' equipment and discovers why Clown is so interested in Levius. Greenbridge featured an abundance of Agartha water springs, and over time, the townsfolk became capable of using Agartha better than normal people. Should Levius lose the upcoming match, Clown will have two genetically enhanced fighters at his disposal.
8	"These Young Geniuses... Are Enough to Make You Sick..."	November 28, 2019
Since AJ's equipment boasts superior technology, Bill insists that Levius replaces his left arm with a prosthetic to stand a much better chance at winning, but Levius refuses. Having re-watched AJ's fight with Hugo on film, Levius works on improving his mobility, with both Zacks and Natalie serving as sparring partners for him. Malcolm Eden, having heard of Levius' upcoming bout, offers to train Levius and teaches him on how to use his senses to dodge AJ's punches. Thanks to Raymond, Bill discovers that Clown keeps AJ under his control through a combination of brainwashing therapy and drugs, which make it next-to-impossible to incapacitate AJ without killing. Malcolm trains Levius with a technique that could smash AJ's steam generator and win the fight without killing her, but the move is incredibly risky, and Levius will have to expose himself to AJ's attacks before he can perform it. Bill also prepares a new prosthetic arm for Levius' upcoming match, but during a regulation checkup, the first out of three before the match, the prosthetic's hypersteam capacity is revealed to be much higher than what the rules permit.
9	"Can You Make the Deadline?"	November 28, 2019
While AJ passes her checkup without issue, Levius fails to pass the second checkup and only passes the third when he asks Bill to remove his front armor, therefore reducing the hypersteam consumption on his prosthetic. Natalia, worried for Levius' safety, begs Levius to forfeit the match, but Levius still chooses to fight. In the night of the match, AJ is mysteriously absent from her corner, until Clown appears in her place and silences the crowd.
10	"It's Me Who Wants to Give You That Thrashing"	November 28, 2019
Clown only shows up in the ring to introduce AJ, who easily keeps Levius on the defensive. As he struggles to dodge AJ's punches, Levius attempts to remind her of Greenbridge. Although AJ is able to remember some moments of the day, including the fact that she has a brother, she is still under Clown's control and continues her attack. Thanks to Malcolm's training, Levius is able to maintain his distance, but AJ is too fast for him to connect a proper blow. Meanwhile, Natalia initially refuses to watch Levius' fight but, after having a conversation with Levius' grandmother, she returns to the ring and cheers for Levius, who smashes AJ's steam generator. Unfortunately, the attack does not result in a knockout and AJ gets up seconds later.
11	"The Possibility of it Working is Infinitely Close to Zero!"	November 28, 2019
Both Bill and Malcolm realize that AJ has two steam generators instead of just one. Since the association only inspects external equipment, this second generator must be installed deep within AJ's body, but Levius has no way of finding it. Zacks removes his eyepatch and uses his injured eye, sensitive to heat, to find the generator. Although he risks losing his eye and suffering brain damage, Zacks finds the generator, right below AJ's heart. However, Levius' prosthetic is broken, and Levius can only use it for a spin-hook, not to mention that punching AJ in an area so close to the heart might kill her. To increase her chances of winning, Clown injects AJ with a serum that turns her into a raging berserker.
12	"It's Finer Than Usual Today"	November 28, 2019
An unstable AJ briefly incapacitates Levius, until Hugo, who is still recovering from his injuries, cheers for Levius. With his Agartha water supply running out, Levius attempts to use his spin-hook, but AJ shatters his prosthetic. Unexpectedly, Levius uses the momentum from AJ's attack to punch her with his flesh-and-blood arm, knocking her out and winning the fight. Clown admits having been impressed by Levius' skills and now that he has proven his worth as a fighter, he has no further use for AJ, whom he threatens to kill unless Levius becomes his property. Enraged by Clown's dishonesty, Levius punches Clown in the face, revealing him to be an automaton. With the match over, Levius and AJ receive medical attention. Sometime later, AJ has moved in with Levius and his family, while the real Clown remains at large.
