= Hozuki's Coolheadedness =

Japanese manga series

- Cover of the first Japanese volume

鬼灯の冷徹 (Hōzuki no Reitetsu)
- Genre: Dark comedy; Supernatural
- Manga
- Written by: Natsumi Eguchi
- Published by: Kodansha
- English publisher: NA: Kodansha Comics
- Magazine: Morning
- Original run: March 3, 2011 – January 9, 2020
- Volumes: 31
- Anime television series
- Directed by: Hiro Kaburaki (season 1); Kazuhiro Yoneda (season 2)
- Written by: Midori Gotō
- Music by: Tomisiro
- Studio: Wit Studio (season 1); Studio Deen (season 2)
- Licensed by: AUS: Madman Entertainment; NA: Sentai Filmworks
- Original network: MBS (season 1); Tokyo MX (season 2)
- English network: SEA: Aniplus Asia
- Original run: January 10, 2014 (Note: As stated on the official website, Hozuki's Coolheadedness officially premiered on January 9, 2014 at 25:35 i.e. January 10, 1:35 AM. This technically resulted in the episodes airing on the days following the ones scheduled. So, instead of ending on April 3, 2014, it ended on April 4.) – July 1, 2018 (Note: The second cour of the second season of Hozuki's Coolheadedness officially premiered on April 7, 2018 at 1:00 "late night" (深夜), according to its official website; AllCinema Movie & DVD Database informs it debuted on April 7, 2018, at 25:00. In both cases, it means the actual broadcast was on April 8, at 1:00 AM. This technically resulted in the episodes airing on the days following the ones scheduled. So, instead of ending in June 30, 2018, it ended on July 1.)
- Episodes: 39
- Original video animation
- Directed by: Hiro Kaburaki (#1–3; Chief #4); Kazuhiro Yoneda (#4–7)
- Written by: Midori Gotō
- Music by: Tomisiro
- Studio: Wit Studio (#1–3); Studio Deen (#4); Pine Jam (#5–7)
- Released: February 23, 2015 – September 23, 2020
- Episodes: 7
- Manga

Hōzuki no Reitetsu: Shiro no Ashiato
- Written by: Monaka Shiba
- Published by: Kodansha
- Magazine: Nakayoshi
- Original run: December 1, 2015 – April 3, 2020
- Volumes: 5

Hozuki's Coolheadedness (Japanese: 鬼灯の冷徹, Hepburn: Hōzuki no Reitetsu) is a Japanese manga series that was written and illustrated by Natsumi Eguchi. The plot revolves around Hozuki, a demon who works for the King and Head Judge of Hell. Kodansha serialized the manga in the magazine Morning between March 2011 and January 2020, and chapters were collected in thirty-one tankōbon volumes.

The manga was adapted into a television anime series; Wit Studio produced the first season in 2014, and Studio Deen was responsible for a second season in 2017–2018. Wit Studio also produced three original animation DVDs (OADs) in 2015, while Studio Deen produced one OAD in 2017, and Pine Jam produced three more OVAs in 2019 and 2020. Crunchyroll made the first season of Hozuki's Coolheadedness available to English-speaking audiences via streaming and Sentai Filmworks licensed the series for release on DVD. Sentai acquired the second season and released it on home media and through the streaming website Hidive.

In Japan, more than 14 million copies of the Hozuki's Coolheadedness manga were in print as of September 2020. The manga and both seasons of the anime have been included at various times in weekly top-ten best-selling lists in their respective media in Japan. The first season of the anime has been well received by English-language reviewers, and was chosen as one of the best anime of 2014. The manga received the 52nd Seiun Sci-Fi Award for Best Comic in 2021.

== Plot ==
An ogre-like demon and former human Hozuki (鬼灯, Hōzuki) works as Chief of Staff under King Enma (閻魔大王, Enma-Daiō), the King and Head Judge of Hell, who determines what kind of hell the dead will be sent to. The serious-minded Hozuki attempts to manage and troubleshoot unusual problems that occur in the Japanese hell. Two of Hozuki's most prominent subordinates are Karauri (唐瓜) and Nasubi (茄子). Other characters in the underworld include Okoh (お香, Okō) the chief assistant of Mortal Hell; Mustard (芥子, Karashi), the rabbit from Kachi-kachi Yama, who acts cute but snaps when someone says Tanuki/Raccoon or acts as one; Peach Maki (ピーチ・マキ, Pīchi Maki), a famous idol in Hell and Hozuki's acquaintance; and Yoshitsune Minamoto (源義経, Minamoto no Yoshitsune), a commander in the Crow-Tengu Police. Hozuki's main rival is Hakutaku (白澤), a Chinese medicine expert who works at Shangri-La. Hakutaku is assisted by Momotarō (桃太郎), who was a famous samurai in life. Momotaro's pets Shiro (シロ) the dog, Kakisuke (柿助) the monkey, and Rurio (ルリオ) the pheasant are also regular characters in the series, working as torturers in the animal cruelty section of hell. In the second season, more characters are introduced such as the original Chief of Staff Izanami-no-Mikoto (伊邪那美命), Miki (ミキ, Miki) an Idol signed in Maki's Idol office and Hozuki's Twin Zashiki-warashi adopted daughters.

== Production ==
In 2010, Natsumi Eguchi won the Honorable Mention Award of the 57th Chiba Tetsuya Awards for Hinichijōtekina Nanigenai Hanashi (非日常的な何気ない話; lit. 'An unusual casual story'). This work's character Oni (鬼; lit. 'Ogre') was the model upon which Hozuki, who would first appear in the Morning's 32nd issue of 2010 with the story Jigoku no Sata to Are ya Kore (地獄の沙汰とあれやこれ; lit. 'The State of the Hell, and This and That'), was based. The series was later renamed Hōzuki no Reitetsu and the magazine started to serialize it.

Eguchi developed a liking for yōkai manga such as GeGeGe no Kitarō and Akuma-kun because of the influence of her parents, whose "strange" preferences for these instead of the typical girl's manga and battle manga lead Eguchi to say she "has been reading only afterworld yōkai books since [she] can remember". The horror-themed series The Laughing Salesman and the Japanese folktales-based Manga Nihon Mukashi Banashi also influenced Eguchi, who attributes this childhood experience to her mother being a classical studies professor, and as such she had access to several mythology and folklore books, one of which was Shigeru Mizuki's compilation of 101 yōkai stories. Eguchi highlighted the influence of the anime adaptation of Mizuki's GeGeGe; she appreciated the characters' scary-but-cute features and their variety in each episode. Other non-horror works, including Doraemon—especially the main character's bossy personality in the "insane" manga as Eguchi dubbed it, rather than the educational anime, also influenced her.

== Media ==
=== Manga ===
The manga series Hozuki's Coolheadedness was written and illustrated by Natsumi Eguchi, and was serialized in Kodansha's Morning seinen magazine from March 3, 2011, to January 9, 2020. Kodansha collected its 271 chapters into thirty-one tankōbon volumes, the first of which was released on May 23, 2011, and the last was released on September 23, 2020. Some volumes were also released in a "limited edition" (限定版, Genteiban) that included new cover artworks and series-related merchandise. Kodansha Comics published an English-language translation through its digital content distributor Kodansha Advanced Media. The first volume was released on March 21, 2017, and the fourth one was released on February 6, 2018. After a hiatus, the fifth volume was made available on December 21, 2021. As of September 20, 2022, ten English digital volumes have been released.

On February 3, 2014, Kodansha released comic and an anime official guidebook, and an artbook was released on November 20, 2015. Kodansha's Nakayoshi magazine published a special chapter on December 27, 2014. From December 1, 2015, to April 3, 2020, the same magazine published a four-panel spin-off that was written by Monaka Shiba and subtitled Shiro no Ashiato (シロの足跡; lit. 'Shiro's Footprints'); it focuses on Shiro. The manga's first tankōbon volume was released on November 22, 2016, and the fifth-and-final installment was released on September 23, 2020.

=== Anime ===
An anime adaptation of Hozuki's Coolheadedness was first announced in Morning's 31st issue in June 2013. The anime's first promotional video was shown in July at Japan Expo in Paris and Anime Expo in Los Angeles. The Hozuki's Coolheadedness anime series was produced by Wit Studio and directed by Hiro Kaburaki, with screenplay by Midori Gotō and character designs by Hirotaka Katō. Mainichi Broadcasting System broadcast it in its programming block Animeism from January 10 to April 4, 2014. King Records released the entire series from April 9 to August 13, 2014, on both DVD and Blu-ray with an "A" and "B" version for each one of the six compilations. (Note: See the attached sources for volume 1: DVD ("A" version), DVD ("B" version), Blu-ray ("A" version), and Blu-ray ("B" version).) (Note: See the attached sources for volume 6: DVD ("A" version), DVD ("B" version), Blu-ray ("A" version), and Blu-ray ("B" version))

Crunchyroll simulcast the series in several English-speaking countries, including the United States, Canada, the United Kingdom, South Africa, Australia, and New Zealand. Sentai Filmworks licensed the series to the North American market in January 2014, and released the series in a box set both on DVD and Blu-ray Disc on February 17, 2015. At the Supernova Pop Culture Expo in April 2015, Madman Entertainment announced it had licensed the series and made it available through its streaming site AnimeLab in August 2015, and released a DVD box set on October 21, 2015, in Australia, and on November 12, 2015, in New Zealand. Aniplus broadcast an English-subtitled version to Indonesia, Thailand, and Singapore.

In June 2014, the production of a series of three original anime DVDs (OADs) was announced by the staff of the anime series. After the release of three teaser videos in August, October, and November, the OADs were screened in 11 theaters in Japan between December 6 and December 28, 2014. They were released along with the 17th, 18th, and 19th manga volumes on February 23, May 22, and August 21, 2015, respectively. In November 2016, the twenty-third volume of the manga announced the series would receive a new anime project that would begin with an OAD, which was bundled with the manga's twenty-fourth limited edition volume and released on March 21, 2017. The staff was the same from the anime and previous OAD series, and Studio Deen took over animation production from Wit Studio.

A second season was announced in March 2017; the voice cast from the 2017 OAD returned to reprise their roles. The second season premiered on October 8, 2017. (Note: The second season of Hozuki's Coolheadedness officially premiered on October 7, 2017, at 1:00 "late night" (深夜), according to its official site; AllCinema Movie & DVD Database informs it debuted on October 7, 2017, at 25:00. In both cases, it means the actual broadcast was on October 8, 2017, at 1:00 AM. This technically resulted in the episodes airing on the days following the ones scheduled. So, instead of ending on December 30, 2017, it ended on December 31.) Sentai Filmworks licensed the season for home media and digital release in North America. Sentai's website Hidive simulcast the season with English subtitles in the United States, Canada, the United Kingdom, Ireland, South Africa, Australia, and New Zealand. After the 13th episode aired on December 31, 2017, it was announced the second season would take a break and return in April 2018. The second cour of the second season premiered on April 8, 2018, and ended on July 1, 2018. In December 2018, Crunchyroll added the second season to its catalog. In Japan, the whole season was released in four DVD and Blu-ray box sets between January 17, 2018, and September 19, 2018. Sentai released the second season in single-volume DVD and Blu-ray box sets on June 11, 2019. After the acquisition of Crunchyroll by Sony Pictures Television, Hozuki's Coolheadedness, among several Sentai Filmworks titles, was dropped from the Crunchyroll streaming service on March 31, 2022.

Pine Jam produced three more OADs, the first two of which were released along with the 29th and 30th manga volumes on September 20, 2019, and March 23, 2020; and the third was released along with the 31st volume on September 23, 2020. Kazuhiro Yoneda and the rest of the staff of the second season reprised their roles.

=== Other ===
Tomisiro, under Starchild Records, composed the music for the Hozuki's Coolheadedness anime series, while Sound Team Don Juan produced the sound. The first season's soundtrack album was released on December 3, 2014, in two editions; one with only a CD and another with a CD and DVD. The second season's soundtrack was released in first cour's DVD and Blu-ray box sets on January 17, 2018.

Animate TV broadcast a thirteen-episode online radio program between December 28, 2013, and April 6, 2014. The show, which is titled Hito ni Kibishiku (ひとにきびしく), was hosted by Hiroki Yasumoto, Hōzuki's voice actor, and the other voice actors appeared as guest. To accompany the anime's return in 2017, a second season titled Motto Hito ni Kibishiku (もっとひとにきびしく) was broadcast from September 15 to December 31. Then, a last season was broadcast between March 16 and July 1, 2018, to accompany the anime's second season second cour.

A free smartphone game for iOS and Android was first announced in March 2018. It was developed by Taito and titled Hōzuki no Reitetsu: Jigoku no Puzzle mo Kimi Shidai (鬼灯の冷徹～地獄のパズルも君次第; "Hell Puzzle is Up to You"), and was released on June 13, 2019.

== Reception ==
Oricon comic rankings
No.	Peak rank	Notes	Refs
1	20	1 week	
2	22	2 weeks	
3	29	2 weeks	
4	12	2 weeks	
5	6	1 week	
6	7	3 weeks	
7	8	3 weeks	
8	6	3 weeks	
9	6	3 weeks	
10	10	2 weeks	
11	7	3 weeks	
12	6	3 weeks	
13	3	4 weeks	
14	5	4 weeks	
15	2	3 weeks	
16	5	4 weeks	
17	5	3 weeks	
18	3	4 weeks	
19	4	4 weeks	
20	6	3 weeks	
21	3	3 weeks	
22	2	4 weeks	
23	3	3 weeks	
24	6	3 weeks	
25	4	4 weeks	
26	6	4 weeks	
27	3	4 weeks	

=== Public response ===
As of September 2020, over 14 million copies of Hozuki's Coolheadedness volumes—including digital ones—and related works had been issued. Several volumes of the series appeared on Oricon's weekly chart of the best-selling manga; all volumes since the fifth one have reached the top 10 (see table). Hozuki's Coolheadedness was among the best-selling manga series of 2014 and 2015, and individual volumes have also reached the list for the first half of 2014, 2015, 2016 and 2017. The series's guidebook also entered the top 25 of one week's best-selling comics.

All six compilations of the anime series appeared on both Oricon's weekly chart of the best-selling DVD and Blu-ray, reaching the top 10 in both categories. (Note: See the attached sources for volume 1 and 2 (DVD), volume 1 and 2 (Blu-ray), volume 3 (DVD), volume 3 (Blu-ray), volume 4 (DVD), volume 4 (Blu-ray), volume 5 (DVD), volume 5 (Blu-ray), volume 6 (DVD), and volume 6 (Blu-ray).) Its first two volumes were released the same day and they ranked first and second on the DVD list, while they were second and third on the Blu-ray list. The first DVD, the fifth Blu-ray, and the sixth DVD volumes topped the list. The first Blu-ray sold over 6,700 copies and the last one sold over 4,700 discs. In a RecoChoku survey of 500 people between the ages of 10 and 50, Hozuki's Coolheadedness was voted the best anime that started in January 2014. Asking the same question the site Animeanime.jp received over 2800 votes, and the anime was the fourth most voted in general, while it was atop among women.

The second season of Hozuki's Coolhdeadedness was the fifth most anticipated anime series of Fall 2017 in a poll conducted by Japanese website Charapedia. The second cour of the season also created anticipation among anime fans; it was the third most anticipated anime for Spring 2018 in a poll by another website, Nijimen, and was the most anticipated in Charapedia's survey. Both the first two DVD boxes and the first two Blu-ray boxes of the second season ranked fourth on Oricon's weekly chart of the best-selling animated media. The DVD version sold about 1,000 copies per box, while the Blu-ray one sold over 2,000 discs per box. The third DVD box charted at number eleven and sold 725 copies. The fourth DVD charted at number three and sold 770 copies, while the fourth Blu-ray charted at number two and sold 1,479.

=== Critical response ===
The 2012 edition of Takarajimasha's Kono Manga ga Sugoi!, which surveys people in the manga and publishing industry, named Hozuki's Coolheadedness along with I the nineteenth-best manga series for male readers. In 2012, it was one of the 15 manga nominated for the 5th Manga Taishō, and a jury selected it for the 16th Japan Media Arts Festival Awards. The series was nominated for the 38th Kodansha Manga Award for Best General Manga, and Media Factory's Da Vinci ranked it fifth on the "Book of the Year" in 2014. It also ranked 25th, 37th, and 47th on Da Vinci's "Book of the Year" in 2018, 2019, and 2020, respectively. In 2021, the manga, along with Kimi o Shinasenai tame no Storia by Toriko Gin, won the 52nd Seiun Sci-fi Award for Best Comic.

Several reviewers named Hozuki's Coolheadedness' first season among their favorite anime of 2014 or of that winter season; this include Vichus Smith of Electronic Gaming Monthly, Seb Reid of UK Anime Network, Kelly Quinn of Tor.com, and Amy McNulty and Gabriella Ekens of Anime News Network (ANN). Most reviewers pondered over its humor, which requires some understanding of Japanese culture, but ultimately appreciated it. Quinn considered it to be one of the year's most original comedy shows because of its "sadistic humor and bizarre setting". Ekens said; "While not every episode provoked peals of laughter, there was just enough cuteness and cleverness aside to make me love this little show". Reid compared it to Polar Bear Cafe because of its "dry, sarcastic" humor style and "weird" stories, and praised the writing for its peculiar stories and dialogues, as well as its "deadpan acting". Josh Tolentino of Japanator often compared it to Lucky Star for its slow pace. He commented; "I've heard rumblings in some circles about [the anime] being intensely boring, but I'm having fun so far. It's just really low-key in the way that, say, Dilbert is low-key." Nicole MacLean of THEM Anime Reviews also found it similar to Dilbert and salaryman manga, especially on the depiction of Hozuki–Enma relationship.

ANN's Carl Kimlinger found the series generally unfavorable; although he noted its premise as singular, he criticized its music, characters and "comedic incompetence". He nevertheless praised its sumi-e-inspired visuals, which are "startlingly beautiful at times, and utterly distinctive at all times". Quinn also praised the series for its visuals, while Tolentino stated "one of this show's best qualities is how it shows off traditional Japanese art". Browne commended the series' mixture of modern character designs with classic art style that creates a "unique and appealing look", and said "the animation is generally quite good, if low-key". Kate O'Neil of The Fandom Post also praised it, stating "the animation is quite superb" and "It's the weird artsy kid sitting in the back row of desks combined with The Office. Many viewers won't get the appeal, but it's always been a fascinating and often funny watch with a great artistic style and well defined personalities."

== See also ==
- Dekin no Mogura, another manga series by the same author
