= The Voynich Hotel =

Japanese manga series

- Cover of the first volume featuring Elena (left) and Berna (right)

ヴォイニッチホテル (Voinitchi Hoteru)
- Genre: Comedy horror; Crime; Supernatural
- Manga
- Written by: Seiman Douman
- Published by: Akita Shoten
- English publisher: NA: Seven Seas Entertainment
- Magazine: Young Champion Retsu
- Original run: October 17, 2006 – March 17, 2015
- Volumes: 3
- icon

The Voynich Hotel (ヴォイニッチホテル, Voinitchi Hoteru) is a Japanese manga series written and illustrated by Seiman Douman. The series utilizes storytelling akin to an episodic chronicle and focuses on supernatural and surreal situations. It was serialized in Akita Shoten's Young Champion Retsu magazine from October 2006 to March 2015 and published in three volumes.

== Plot ==
The series revolves around the supernatural Voynich Hotel which is on a lone island located in the South Pacific. The protagonist, Kazuki Taizou, resides at the hotel to flee from his yakuza past. Many characters are given episodic roles, highlighting the island's abnormal nature. Kazuki Taizou forms close connections to the maids of the Voynich Hotel, especially Berna, who plays a critical role in continuing her lineage being the only witch naturally alive. Once Kazuki's past comes to haunt him, Berna arrives to protect him.

== Publication ==
Written and illustrated by Seiman Douman, the series began serialization in Akita Shoten's Young Champion Retsu magazine on October 17, 2006. It completed its serialization on March 17, 2015. The series' individual chapters were collected into three tankōbon volumes.

In September 2017, Seven Seas Entertainment announced that they licensed the series for English publication.

=== Volume list ===
No.	Original release date	Original ISBN	English release date	English ISBN
1	November 19, 2010	978-4-25-325571-4	July 24, 2018	978-1-62-692820-6
Days 1–26
2	February 20, 2013	978-4-25-325572-1	October 16, 2018	978-1-62-692929-6
Days 27–50
3	May 20, 2015	978-4-25-325573-8	January 29, 2019	978-1-62-692987-6
Days 51–67; Last Days

== Reception ==
Rebecca Silverman of Anime News Network praised the characters and setting, though she noted the series "often feels too deliberately weird". Silverman also praised Seven Seas Entertainment's allusion to the Eagles' 1977 song "Hotel California" on the back of the book. A columnist for Manga News praised the use of horror and comedy in the story. He also compared it to the works of Kōji Kumeta and Tim Burton.

== See also ==
- How Many Light-Years to Babylon?, another manga series by the same author
- Nickelodeon, another manga series by the same author
