= Noriko Sasaki =

Japanese manga artist

Noriko Sasaki (佐々木 倫子, Sasaki Noriko; born 7 October 1961) is a Japanese manga artist. She is best known for her Dōbutsu no Oisha-san series.

== Selected works ==
- Apron Complex (エプロン・コンプレックス, Epuron Kompurekksu), 1980
- Peppermint Spy (ペパミント・スパイ, Pepaminto Supai), 1985–1987
- Dōbutsu no Oisha-san (動物のお医者さん), 1988–1993 (became a TV drama in 2003)
- Otanko Nurse (おたんこナース, Otanko Nāsu), 1995–1998
- Heaven?, 1999–2003
- Tsukidate no Satsujin (月館の殺人), 2005–2006
- Channel wa sono mama! (チャンネルはそのまま!), 2008–2013 (became a TV drama in 2019)
