= Seimu Yoshizaki =

Japanese manga artist

Seimu Yoshizaki (芳崎せいむ, Seimu Yoshizaki; born in Kanagawa) is a Japanese manga artist. She made her debut with Aka–chan to Tenshi in 1989. She is best known for Kingyo Used Books (2004–2020), serialized in Shogakukan's Monthly Ikki magazine.

Yoshizaki has illustrated manga written by Takashi Nagasaki, who also works under the pen names Toshusai Garaku and Richard Woo, several times since Telekinesis Yamate TV Kinema Shitsu (2004–2007). They first reunited for the female detective manga Deka Girl, which ran in Kodansha's Kiss Plus from 2008 to August 2011. The two then serialized the science fiction detective series Usagi Tantei Monogatari (2012–2013) for Kodansha's Kiss. Yoshizaki and Woo created Abracadabra: Ryōki Hanzai Tokusōshitsu in Big Comic Original Zōkan from 2014 to 2020. It won the first Saito Takao Award in 2018. In 2022, the two began the suspense manga Minzoku Gakusha Akasaka Yaichirō no Jiken-bo in the October issue of Kodansha's Monthly Afternoon, which was released on August 24, 2022.

== Selected works ==
- The Paradise on the Earth (地球の楽園) (1994–1996)
- Kingyoya Koshoten Suitouchō (金魚屋古書店出納帳) (2000–2002, serialized in OURs Girl and OURs Lite, Shōnen Gahōsha)
- Kingyo Used Books (金魚屋古書店) (2004–2020, originally serialized in Monthly Ikki, Shogakukan)
- Telekinesis Yamate TV Kinema Shitsu (テレキネシス 山手テレビキネマ室) (2004–2007, written by Toshusai Garaku, serialized in Big Comic Spirits, Shogakukan)
- Ugokashiya (うごかし屋) (2008–2010, serialized in Big Comic Original, Shogakukan)
- Deka Girl (デカガール) (2008–2011, written by Takashi Nagasaki, serialized in Kiss Plus, Kodansha)
- Usagi Tantei Monogatari (うさぎ探偵物語) (2012–2013, written by Takashi Nagasaki, serialized in Kiss, Kodansha)
- Abracadabra: Ryōki Hanzai Tokusōshitsu (アブラカダブラ 〜猟奇犯罪特捜室〜) (2014–2020, written by Richard Woo)
- Minzoku Gakusha Akasaka Yaichirō no Jiken-bo (民俗学者 赤坂弥一郎の事件簿) (2022–2023, written by Richard Woo, serialized in Monthly Afternoon, Kodansha)
