= Shunji Enomoto =

Japanese manga artist

Shunji Enomoto (榎本俊二, Enomoto Shunji; born 1968 in Kanagawa Prefecture) is a Japanese manga artist. Two of his lengthy manga serials, Golden Lucky and Enomoto: New Elements that Shake the World, ran in the magazine Weekly Morning from 1989 to 1996, and 1997 to 2003, respectively. His other published works include the graphic novel Hangyaku no Noroshi (Curse of the Traitor), Eiga de Nigirippi (Holding in Farts at the Movies) (which ran in the now-defunct Young Magazine Uppers), Enotic, The Family Zoo (with writer Chuya Chikazawa), Kajiba no Baka IQ, and The Kinks. His manga are known for their unusual visual rhythms and formal devices and for their obsessive and extreme scatological humor.

Enomoto has a cult following in the United States among fans of alternative comics and manga. His works have been enthusiastically reviewed in The Comics Journal, which also published a short untitled comic by him in its Winter 2004 Special Edition. An English language scanlation has been made of The Family Zoo. Works by Enomoto have also been published in Spanish and Italian translations.

Enomoto is a graduate of Yokohama's Japan Film School.

Enomoto's The Kinks won the 29th Tezuka Osamu Cultural Prize in 2025 in the Best Short Work category.
