= Great Graphic Novels for Teens =

Annual literary award for graphic novels

The American Library Association's Great Graphic Novels for Teens, established in 2007, is an annual list presented by Young Adult Library Services Association (YALSA) division of graphic novels and illustrated nonfiction geared toward individuals ages 12–18.

Like YALSA's other lists, librarians, parents, and educators rely on the Great Graphic Novels for Teens list to help select suitable texts for their collections. This is particularly important for graphic novels, which are popular among young adults and have rapidly gained popularity in the past thirty years. Graphic novels are especially popular among "reluctant readers" and "visual learners", and they can "improve comprehension and interpretation of themes, literary devices, and social issues, among other topics."

== Criteria ==
To be included on the Great Graphic Novels for Teens list, books must have been published "during the sixteen months preceding the award", "appeal to ages twelve to eighteen", and be widely available in the United States. Graphic novels of all types are considered with one limitation: "comic book compilations must contain an overarching story arc."

In selecting texts for the list, YALSA librarians judge books based on "quality, appeal, and suitability for a teenage audience".

== Representations of diversity ==
Researchers have analyzed the Great Graphic Novels for Teens list for representations of diversity.

Irwin and Moeller analyzed the 2008 list for representations of individuals with disabilities. Out of 30 graphics novels, 40% included a character with a disability and 13% included two characters with disability, including seven characters with health impairments, three characters with visual impairments, three characters with orthopedic impairments, two characters with emotional disturbances, and one character with a learning disability. Irwin and Moeller found that, according to the Biklen and Bogdan stereotypes, characters were frequently represented as evil and/or "their own worst enemy" and "pitiable"; women with disabilities were more likely to be portrayed as pitiable, whereas only men with disabilities were portrayed as evil. Importantly, 10% of the novels included characters that "were portrayed as inclusive members of their communities".

Reviewing the 2015 list for representations of race, Moeller and Becnel found that 76% of books included characters of color. Further, 5% of the books "were almost entirely comprised of Asian actors".

Mumm's 2017 master's thesis analyzed female characters on the 2016 list and found that female characters were diverse in appearance, had "relatable conversations", and broke away from "stereotypical behaviors", though "some stereotypical conventions remain".

== Recipients ==
=== 2000s ===
Great Graphic Novels for Teens top ten (2007–2009)
Year	Writer(s)	Artist(s)	Title
2007	Warren Ellis	Stuart Immonen (penciler), Wade Von Grawbadger (inker), and Dave McCaig (colorist)	NextWave: Agents of H.A.T.E., Vol. 1: This is What They Want
2007	Gilbert Hernandez	Jared K. Fletcher (lettering)	Sloth
2007	Linda Medley		Castle Waiting
2007	Brad Meltzer	Rags Morales	Identity Crisis
2007	Tsugumi Ohba	Takeshi Obata	Death Note, V. 1–3
2007	Brian K. Vaughan	Adrian Alphona	Runaways, V. 4–6
2007	Brian K. Vaughan	Niko Henrichon	Pride of Baghdad
2007	Gary Whitta	Ted Naifeh	Death, Jr.
2007	Brian Wood	Becky Cloonan	Demo: The Collection
2007	Gene Luen Yang	Lark Pien	American Born Chinese
2008	Nick Abadzis		Laika
2008	Mike Carey		Re-Gifters
2008	Ann Marie Fleming		The Magical Life of Long Tack Sam
2008	Keith Giffen		Blue Beetle: Shell-shocked
2008	Yuji Iwahara		King of Thorn
2008	Matthew Loux		Sidescrollers
2008	Setona Mizushiro		After School Nightmare
2008	Peter Sis		The Wall: Growing Up Behind the Iron Curtain
2008	Shaun Tan		The Arrival
2009	Jessica Abel and Gabriel Soria	Warren Pleece	Life Sucks
2009	Hinako Ashihara		Sand Chronicles
2009	Brian Clevinger	Steve Wegener	Atomic Robo: Atomic Robo and the Fightin' Scientists of Tesladyne
2009	Takehiko Inoue		Real
2009	Junji Ito		Uzumaki
2009	Youme Landowne	Anthony Horton	Pitch Black
2009	Aimee Major Steinberger		Japan Ai: A Tall Girl’s Adventures in Japan
2009	Mariko Tamaki	Jillian Tamaki	Skim
2009	Gerard Way	Gabriel Bá	Umbrella Academy: Apocalypse Suite
2009	G. Willow Wilson	M. K. Perker	Cairo

=== 2010s ===
Great Graphic Novels for Teens top ten (2010–2019)
Year	Writer(s)	Artist(s)	Title
2010	Jim Hardison	Bart Sears	The Helm
2010	Daisuke Igarashi		Children of the Sea, V. 1
2010	Van Jensen	Dusty Higgins	Pinocchio: Vampire Slayer
2010	Joe Kelly	J. M. Ken Nimura	I Kill Giants
2010	Jonathan Lethem	Farel Dalrymple	Omega the Unknown
2010	Jeremy Love		Bayou, V. 1
2010	Josh Neufeld		A.D.: New Orleans After the Deluge
2010	Tom Siddell		Gunnerkrigg Court, V. 1
2010	Naoki Urasawa and Takashi Nagasaki	Naoki Urasawa	Pluto
2010	Fumi Yoshinaga		Ooku: The Inner Chambers, V. 1
2011	Aristophane with Matt Madden (trans.)		The Zabime Sisters
2011	Brandon Dayton		Green Monk
2011	Hisae Iwaoka		Saturn Apartments, V. 1
2011	Susan Kim and Laurence Klavan	Faith Erin Hicks	Brain Camp
2011	John Layman	Rob Guillory	Chew, V. 1
2011	G. Neri	Randy Duburke	Yummy: The Last Days of a Southside Shorty
2011	Jason Shiga		Meanwhile: Pick Any Path. 3,856 Story Possibilities
2011	Raina Telgemeier		Smile
2011	Doug TenNapel		Ghostopolis
2011	Drew Weing		Set to Sea
2012	Brian Michael Bendis	Alex Maleev	Scarlet
2012	Vera Brosgol		Anya’s Ghost
2012	Brooke Gladstone	Josh Neufeld	The Influencing Machine: Brooke Gladstone on the Media
2012	Roger Langridge	Chris Samnee and Matt Wilson	Thor: The Mighty Avenger, V. 1–2
2012	Kagan McLeod		Infinite Kung Fu
2012	Kaoru Mori		A Bride's Story
2012	Malachai Nicolle	Ethan Nicolle	Axe Cop
2012	Brian Ralph		Daybreak
2012	Takako Shimura		Wandering Son, V. 1
2012	Amir Soltani	Khalil Bendib	Zahra’s Paradise
2013	Derf Backderf		My Friend Dahmer
2013	Jonathan Fetter-Vorm		Trinity: A Graphic History of the First Atomic Bomb
2013	Joseph Lambert		Annie Sullivan and the Trials of Helen Keller
2013	Brian Michael Bendis	Sara Pichelli	Ultimate Comics: Spider-man, V. 1
2013	Faith Erin Hicks		Friends with Boys
2013	Holly Black, Louise Hawes, Todd Mitchell, Alisa Kwitney, and Bill Willingham	Rebecca Guay	A Flight of Angels
2013	Mark Long and Jim Demonakos	Nate Powell	The Silence of Our Friends
2013	Takashi Murakami		Stargazing Dog
2013	Raina Telgemeier		Drama
2013	Mark Waid	Paolo Manuel Rivera and Marcos Martin	Daredevil, V. 1
2014	John Lewis, Andrew Aydin, and Nate Powell		March: Book 1
2014	Laura Lee Gulledge		Will & Whit
2014	Faith Erin Hicks		The Adventures of Superhero Girl
2014	Sheila Keenan	Nathan Fox	Dogs of War
2014	Matt Kindt		MIND MGMT
2014	Royden Lepp		Rust, V. 2
2014	Sharon McKay	Daniel Lafrance	War Brothers: The Graphic Novel
2014	Io Sakisaka		Strobe Edge, V. 1–6
2014	Prudence Shen	Faith Erin Hicks	Nothing Can Possibly Go Wrong
2014	Gene Luen Yang		Boxers and Saints
2015	Roberto Aguirre-Sacasa	Francesco Francavilla	Afterlife with Archie: Escape from Riverdale
2015	John Allison		Bad Machinery, V. 3
2015	Mike Richardson	Stan Sakai	47 Ronin
2015	Cory Doctorow	Jen Wang	In Real Life
2015	G. Willow Wilson	Adrian Alphona	Ms. Marvel, V. 1
2015	Bryan Lee O’Malley		Seconds: a Graphic Novel
2015	Gene Luen Yang	Sonny Liew	The Shadow Hero
2015	Emily Carroll		Through The Woods
2015	Jeff Lemire		Trillium
2015	Mamoru Hosoda	Yu	Wolf Children: Ame & Yuki
2016	Svetlana Chmakova		Awkward
2016	Don Brown		Drowned City: Hurricane Katrina and New Orleans
2016	ND Stevenson, Grace Ellis, and Shannon Watters	Gus Allen	Lumberjanes, V. 1–2
2016	G. Willow Wilson	Jacob Wyatt and Adrian Alphona	Ms. Marvel, V. 3
2016	G. Willow Wilson	Takeshi Miyazawa and Elmo Bondoc	Ms. Marvel, V. 3
2016	ND Stevenson		Nimona
2016	Victoria Jamieson		Roller Girl
2016	Liz Suburbia		Sacred Heart
2016	Yoshitoki Ōima		A Silent Voice
2016	Derf Backderf		Trashed
2016	Ryan North	Erica Henderson	The Unbeatable Squirrel Girl, V. 1–2
2017	John Allison	Lissa Treiman	Giant Days, V. 1–2
2017	Ta-Nehisi Coates	Brian Stelfreeze	Black Panther, Book One: A Nation Under Our Feet
2017	Ben Hatke		Mighty Jack
2017	Jeff Lemire	Emi Lennox	Plutona
2017	John Lewis, Andrew Aydin, and Nate Powell		March: Book 3
2017	Edward Ross		Filmish: a Graphic Journey Through Film
2017	Mark Russel	Ben Caldwell and Mark Morales	Prez, V. 1
2017	Ichigo Takano		orange: The Complete Collection 1
2017	Brian K. Vaughan	Cliff Chiang	Paper Girls 1
2017	Brian K. Vaughan	Steve Skroce and Matt Hollingsworth	We Stand On Guard
2018	James Tynion IV	Rian Sygh	The Backstagers
2018	Jeff Lemire	Dean Ormston	Black Hammer, V. 1
2018	Svetlana Chmakova		Brave
2018	Tony Medina	Stacey Robison and John Jennings	I Am Alfonso Jones
2018	Sam Humphries	Caitlin Rose Boyle	Jonesy, V. 1–3
2018	Damian Duffy and Octavia E. Butler	John Jenning	Kindred: A Graphic Novel Adaptation
2018	Katie Green		Lighter Than My Shadow
2018	Gengoroh Tagame		My Brother’s Husband
2018	Nidhi Chanani		Pashmina
2018	Scott Westerfeld	Alex Puvilland	Spill Zone
2019	Anne Frank and Ari Folman	David Polonsky	Anne Frank's Diary: The Graphic Adaptation
2019	Svetlana Chmakova		Crush
2019	Jarrett Krosoczka		Hey, Kiddo: How I Lost My Mother, Found My Father, and Dealt With Family Addiction
2019	Eoin Colfer and Andrew Donkin	Giovanni Rigano	Illegal
2019	Gengoroh Tagame		My Brother’s Husband, V. 2
2019	Tillie Walden		On a Sunbeam
2019	Jeff Lemire		Royal City, V. 2–3
2019	Hiromu Arakawa		Silver Spoon, V. 1–4
2019	Laurie Halse Anderson	Emily Carroll	Speak: The Graphic Novel
2019	Don Brown		The Unwanted: Stories of the Syrian Refugees

=== 2020s ===
Great Graphic Novels for Teens top ten (2020–present)
Year	Writer(s)	Artist(s)	Title
2020	Kevin Panetta	Savanna Ganucheau	Bloom
2020	Hannah Templer		Cosmoknights: Book One
2020	Malaka Gharib		I Was Their American Dream: A Graphic Memoir
2020	Colleen AF Venable	Ellen T. Crenshaw	Kiss Number 8
2020	Mariko Tamaki		Laura Dean Keeps Breaking Up With Me
2020	David F. Walker	Damon Smyth and Marissa Louise	The Life of Frederick Douglass: A Graphic Narrative of a Slave's Journey from Bondage to Freedom.
2020	Rainbow Rowell	Faith Erin Hicks	Pumpkinheads
2020	Max de Radiguès		Simon & Louise
2020	George Takei and Justin Eisinger	Harmony Becker	They Called Us Enemy
2020	Kamome Shirahama		Witch Hat Atelier, V. 1–3
2021	Robin Ha		Almost American Girl
2021	Kaito		Blue Flag, V. 1–5
2021	Joel Christian Gill		Fights: One Boy's Triumph Over Violence
2021	Karen Schneemann	Lily Williams	Go With the Flow
2021	Sarah Mirk	Gerardo Alba, Kasia Babis, Alex Beguez, Tracy Chahwan, Nomi Kane, Omar Khouri, and Kane Lynch	Guantánamo Voices: True Accounts from the World’s Most Infamous Prison
2021	Carmen Maria Machado	DaNi	The Low, Low Woods
2021	Trung Le Nguyen		The Magic Fish
2021	Kat Leyh		Snapdragon
2021	Gene Luen Yang	Gurihiru	Superman Smashes the Klan, V. 1–2
2022	Naoki Urasawa		Asadora! V. 1–4
2022	David F. Walker	Marcus Kwame Anderson	The Black Panther Party: A Graphic Novel History
2022	Keito Gaku		Boys Run the Riot, V. 1–3
2022	Lee Knox Ostertag		The Girl from the Sea
2022	Stan Stanley		The Hazards of Love, V. 1
2022	Harmony Becker		Himawari House
2022	Erika Moen and Matthew Nolan		Let's Talk About It: The Teen's Guide to Sex, Relationships, and Being a Human
2022	L.L. McKinney	Robyn Smith	Nubia: Real One
2022	John Lewis and Andrew Aydin	L. Fury and Nate Powell	Run: Book One
2022	Chugong	Dubu	Solo Leveling
2023	Ian Rosenberg	Mike Cavallaro	Free Speech Handbook: A Practical Framework for Understanding Our Free Speech Protections
2023	Kanehito Yamada	Tsukasa Abe	Frieren: Beyond Journey's End, V. 1–6
2023	Claribel A. Ortega	Rose Bousamra	Frizzy
2023	Huda Fahmy		Huda F Are You?
2023	Sas Milledge		Mamo, V. 1
2023	Melanie Gillman		Other Ever Afters: New Queer Fairy Tales
2023	Gengoroh Tagame		Our Colors
2023	Jade Armstrong		Scout Is Not a Band Kid
2023	Tom Taylor	John Timms	Superman: Son of Kal-El, V. 1
2023	Lewis Hancox		Welcome to St. Hell: My Trans Teen Misadventure
2024	Mari Costa		Belle of the Ball
2024	Jasmine Walls	Teo Duvall	Brooms
2024	Thien Pham		Family Style: Memories of an American from Vietnam
2024	Makoto Ojiro		Insomniacs After School, V. 1-2
2024	Pedro Martín		Mexikid: A Graphic Memoir
2024	Sarah Myer		Monstrous: A Transracial Adoption Story
2024	Muhammad Najem and Nora Neus	Julie Robine	Muhammad Najem, War Reporter: How One Boy Put the Spotlight on Syria
2024	Darrin Bell		The Talk
2024	Petra Erika Nordlund		Tiger, Tiger, V. 1
2024	Tommie Smith and Derrick Barnes	Dawud Anyabwile	Victory. Stand! Raising My Fist for Justice
2025	Christopher Twin		Bad Medicine
2025	David F. Walker	Marcus Kwame Anderson	Big Jim and the White Boy: An American Classic Reimagined
2025	Samuel Teer		Brownstone
2025	Kei Urana		Gachiakuta
2025	Gene Luen Yang	LeUyen Pham	Lunar New Year Love Story
2025	Jeremy Whitley	Casio Ribeiro	Navigating with You
2025	Kim Hyun Sook and Ryan Estrada	Ryan Estrada	No Rules Tonight
2025	Vera Brosgol		Plain Jane and the Mermaid
2025	Alyssa Wong	Haining	Spirit World
2025	Hyeon A Cho		Your Letter
2026	Yumeji		Eden of Witches
2026	Christine Mari		Halfway There: A Graphic Memoir of Self-Discovery
2026	Taylor Robin		Hunger's Bite
2026	You Chiba		Kindergarten Wars
2026	Askel Aden		Love, Misha
2026	Jorge Aguirre	Andrés Vera Martínez	Monster Locker, vol. 1
2026	Meredith McClaren		Meat Eaters
2026	Maria van Lieshout		Song of a Blackbird
2026	Inuhiko Doronoda		Spacewalking With You, vol. 1
2026	Mary Shyne		You and Me on Repeat

=== Repeat recipients ===
Multiple writers have been included on the list more than once. Jeff Lemire, Brian K. Vaughan, G. Willow Wilson, and Gene Luen Yang, have each been featured on the list four times. Together, John Lewis, Andrew Aydin, and Nate Powell have been listed three times. Svetlana Chmakova and David F. Walker have also appeared on the list three times. Lastly, the following writers have each been included on the list twice: John Allison, Derf Backderf, Brian Michael Bendis, Don Brown, Faith Erin Hicks, ND Stevenson, Gengoroh Tagame, and Raina Telgemeier.

Multiple artists have been included on the list more than once, not including writers who also illustrate their own texts. Adrian Alphona has illustrated three books on the list. Faith Erin Hicks and Francesco Francavilla have each illustrated two books on the list.

== See also ==
- Graphic Novels & Comics Round Table - division of ALA dedicated to graphic novels
