= List of Wandering Son episodes =

Cover art of the first BD/DVD compilation released by Aniplex, featuring main characters Shuichi Nitori (left) and Yoshino Takatsuki (right)

The 12-episode Wandering Son Japanese anime television series is based on the manga series of the same name written and illustrated by Takako Shimura. It is directed by Ei Aoki and produced by the animation studio AIC Classic and production company Aniplex. Chief animator Ryūichi Makino is also the character designer and the screenplay was written by Mari Okada. Composed by Satoru Kosaki and Keiichi Okabe, both from Monaca, the music is produced by Aniplex with Jin Aketagawa as the sound director. The story depicts a male child named Shuichi Nitori who wants to be a girl, and Shuichi's friend Yoshino Takatsuki, a female child who wants to be a boy. The anime adapts the manga from volume five onwards, where the main characters enter their first year of junior high school.

The series aired in Japan between January 13 and March 31, 2011, on Fuji TV's Noitamina programming block. Crunchyroll simulcasted the anime on their streaming website. Aniplex released the anime on six Blu-ray and DVD compilation volumes in Japan between April 27 and September 21, 2011. Episodes 10 and 11 were edited into a single episode which was broadcast on March 25, 2011, and were released individually on their respective BD/DVD volumes. Two pieces of theme music are used for the episodes: one opening theme and one ending theme. The opening theme is "Itsu datte." (いつだって。) by Daisuke and the ending theme is "For You" by Rie fu.

== Episode list ==
No.	Title	Directed by	Original release date
1	"What Are Girls Made Of? ~Roses are red, violets are blue~" Transliteration: "Onna no Kotte, Nande Dekiteru? ~Roses are red, violets are blue~" (Japanese: おんなのこって、なんでできてる?～Roses are red, violets are blue～)	Ei Aoki	January 13, 2011
Shuichi Nitori was assigned male at birth, but wishes to be a girl, while Yoshino Takatsuki is the opposite, and they both like to cross-dress as another gender. As the two begin their life as junior high school students, they reflect on the events of their elementary school days, during which Shuichi confessed to Yoshino, but was rejected because Yoshino was not ready for love yet. During the first day of class, Yoshino is impressed by a girl named Chizuru Sarashina who came into school with a boy's uniform, while another classmate Saori Chiba lashes out at another student for bringing up rumors of Shuichi and Yoshino dating. After a day of walking around the city in a girl's school-uniform, Shuichi tries on a dress belonging to Shuichi's sister, Maho. Maho catches Shuichi wearing it and says it is a disgusting thing to do. Shuichi runs into Yoshino, and feels better after Yoshino's attempts to brighten the mood. The two make up.
2	"Hate, Hate, Despise ~Cry baby cry~" Transliteration: "Kirai, Kirai, Daikirai ～Cry baby cry～" (Japanese: きらい きらい 大嫌い～Cry baby cry～)	Makoto Bessho	January 20, 2011
Shuichi and Yoshino are impressed with Chizuru's lively attitude, while Saori almost gets in a fight with Chizuru's friend, Momoko Shirai. Meanwhile, some second-year girls become agitated with Saori for not saying hello to them. Yoshino and Saori, who do not see eye to eye, join separate sports clubs, both of which are on the same court, which makes the situation awkward for their mutual friend, Kanako Sasa, who yells at both of them. Yoshino tries to patch things up for Sasa's sake, but Saori refuses to go along. Nine months previous, Saori, who liked Shuichi, got angry at Yoshino because Shuichi liked Yoshino, and Yoshino got angry at her for always making Yoshino out to be the bad guy. Shuichi and a new friend Makoto Ariga convince Yoshino to make up with Saori and Sasa and they, along with Chizuru and Momoko, go together to get ice cream. Saori admits she was wrong for not greeting the second-year girls, which evokes laughter from Chizuru.
3	"Romeo and Juliet ~Juliet and romeo~" Transliteration: "Romio to Jurietto ~Juliet and romeo~" (Japanese: ロミオとジュリエット～Juliet and romeo～)	Masashi Abe	January 27, 2011
Yoshino is shocked when told to start wearing a bra. Per Saori's suggestion, the class decides to do a gender bender play, in which boys play as girls and vice versa, for the upcoming cultural festival, with Yoshino suggesting that Shuichi write the scenario. The next day, Shuichi stays up late thinking up ideas for the play and ends up in the nurse's office along with Yoshino, whose distaste for wearing a bra helps Shuichi come up with the idea for the script. Later, as Shuichi and Makoto become concerned about when their voices might change due to puberty, they decide to do recordings of them as girls, which annoys Maho, who has a cold, and puts her in an awkward situation when her boyfriend, Riku Seya, drops by for a visit. Meanwhile, the class teacher decides to combine Shuichi's original story with Saori's idea for a modern Romeo and Juliet, so Saori invites Shuichi over to her house to work on the combined script. The next day, Shuichi notices Yoshino wearing a bra.
4	"I'll Give You My Name ~The sound of your name~" Transliteration: "Watashi no Namae o Ageru ~The sound of your name~" (Japanese: 私の名前をあげる～The sound of your name～)	Chizuru Miyawaki	February 3, 2011
Shuichi starts to grow concerned about Yoshino, who has been spacing out recently. While writing the screenplay, Maho's colleague, Anna Suehiro, teases Shuichi to the point of tears. Meanwhile, Yoshino meets up with a transgender adult friend, Yuki. While at Shuichi's house, Saori comments that the screenplay represents Shuichi's want to be a girl and in love with a male Yoshino. The next day, Yoshino and Shuichi go out shopping for clothes. There, Shuichi asks Yoshino to play Romeo in the play so that Yoshino can see Shuichi as a girl. Yoshino accepts the role, but does not interpret it as Shuichi's romantic confession. Meanwhile, Anna decides to buy Shuichi a phone strap, although Shuichi is not sure what she means by it. The next day at school, the teacher suggests that volunteers help Shuichi and Saori with their script, which aggravates Saori. When Saori invites Shuichi over afterwards, it is revealed that despite being turned down by Yoshino, Shuichi still wants to become a girl for personal reasons. Saori, who still has feelings for Shuichi, asks that Yoshino not be mentioned in front of her again.
5	"The End of Summer ~Long, long shadow~" Transliteration: "Natsu no Owari ni ~Long, long shadow~" (Japanese: 夏の終わりに～Long, long shadow～)	Makoto Bessho	February 17, 2011
As the gang come over to Saori's house to work on the script, Saori reveals to Makoto that she intends to enter the running for the role of Romeo. Saori's friend from church, Fumiya Ninomiya, arrives and inadvertently reveals Shuichi's affinity for cross-dressing to the others, which annoys Yoshino. Shuichi accepts that Yoshino acts angry in Shuichi's place, as Shuichi is uncomfortable with anger. They eventually finish the script and celebrate with fireworks. Upon returning to school, the roles for the play are decided by a random draw, with Saori drawing Romeo and Makoto drawing Juliet. Annoyed with the outcome, Saori wants to make edits to the script so everyone is killed off, though is eventually convinced otherwise. While delivering tickets to Yuki and Shiina, Shuichi and Yoshino run into Anna, who has the same phone strap she bought Shuichi. Meanwhile, Saori decides to do her best in her role as Romeo, encouraging Makoto to carry out the role of Juliet.
6	"Cultural Festival ~Dream of butterfly~" Transliteration: "Bunkasai ~Dream of butterfly~" (Japanese: 文化祭～Dream of butterfly～)	Hiroki Hayashi	February 24, 2011
The cultural festival is underway, with some commotion caused when Anna brings popular model Maiko, who Maho works with, to the event. Shuichi, Makoto, and the others have fun in the haunted house before running into Maiko, who Chizuru is a fan of. Yuki and Shiina pay Shuichi and Yoshino a visit while running through their lines. As the play starts, Makoto gets stage fright, but Saori and the others manage to give Makoto encouragement and the play manages to become a success. After the play, Saori decides to give the flowers she got from Fumiya to Makoto, acknowledging that Makoto made a good Juliet.
7	"Rosy Cheeks ~Growing pains~" Transliteration: "Barairo no Hoho ~Growing pains~" (Japanese: 薔薇色の頬～Growing pains～)	Kyōhei Ishiguro	March 3, 2011
Shuichi gets a first pimple, and so asks Anna for some skincare advice. Meanwhile, both Shuichi and Saori get scouted for the drama club, with Saori still expressing her hatred for Yoshino. Shuichi soon realizes feelings for Anna and the two soon start dating. Makoto learns about this when overhearing Maho joking about it at a study session. Shuichi soon reveals the relationship when visiting Yuki and Shiina with Yoshino, who starts becoming distant from Shuichi. Yoshino later tells this to Saori, who starts skipping school as a result, threatening to quit. Yoshino later goes to Saori's house in order to make up with her.
8	"Spring ~Brand new me~" Transliteration: "Haru ~Brand new me~" (Japanese: 春～Brand new me～)	Shōgo Arai	March 10, 2011
A new school year starts, with the group split into separate classes. Anna notices Shuichi's affinity towards girls clothing and asks Shuichi to dress as a girl for their next date. Meanwhile, Shuichi's classmate, Shinpei Doi, notices Shuichi hanging out with Yuki and asks Shuichi to be friends with him. Yoshino and Saori end up running into Shuichi and Anna on their cross-dressing date and end up joining them to karaoke. Anna points out Saori's attitude problem, which leads Yoshino to unintentionally reveal their relations to Shuichi. Despite the awkwardness, Yoshino appreciates the fact that opportunity to hang out with Shuichi and Saori like they used to do.
9	"Cool Girlfriend ~Green eye~" Transliteration: "Kakkoii Kanojo ~Green eye~" (Japanese: かっこいい彼女～Green eye～)	Kōji Yoshikawa	March 17, 2011
Having previously checked with Anna if it was okay to hang around Shuichi, Yoshino decides to wear a male uniform to school, much to the surprise of the other students and teachers. Wanting to meet the woman he had seen Shuichi with, Doi accompanies Shuichi and Yoshino to visit Yuki, only to be shocked to learn she is transgender. Doi later asks to see Shuichi while cross-dressing, telling Shuichi to come to school dressed like a girl. Although Chizuru and Yoshino warn Shuichi that it is a bad idea, Shuichi decides to go to school in a girl's school uniform, causing an uproar.
10	"10 + 11 ~Better half~"	Hiroki Hayashi; Makoto Bessho	March 24, 2011
Following the incident, Shuichi feels frustrated at being treated differently by the school from the times Chizuru and Yoshino cross-dressed. Shuichi continues to be picked on by other students at school. Meanwhile, Anna becomes conflicted on how to approach Shuichi following the incident, and eventually decides to break up. Shuichi's class once again opts to do a gender bender play for the next school festival, with Saori suggesting Shuichi use the script from the previous year. Later, Shuichi tells Doi that their friendship is over, and decides not to dress as a girl at school anymore.
10	"They Only Laughed at Me ~Black sheep~" Transliteration: "Boku Dake Warawareta ~Black sheep" (Japanese: ぼくだけ笑われた～Black sheep～)	Hiroki Hayashi	August 24, 2011
11	"Confession ~Each season~" Transliteration: "Kokuhaku ~Each Season~" (Japanese: 告白～Each season～)	Makoto Bessho	September 21, 2011
12 (11)	"Forever a Wandering Son ~Wandering son's progress~" Transliteration: "Hōrō Musuko wa Doko Made mo ~Wandering son's progress~" (Japanese: 放浪息子はどこまでも～Wandering son's progress～)	Ei Aoki	March 31, 2011
As each of the classes work on their projects for the upcoming festival, Shuichi reluctantly asks Doi for help revising the script. Saori later invites Shuichi and Yoshino to try on some dresses, reminding them of the fun they had when they were younger. The festival soon arrives, with various attractions taking place. Shuichi runs into Anna, who apologizes for the mean things she said during their break up. As the play begins, Shuichi's voice has dropped, causing some anxiety. However, Shuichi resolves to stay strong and steps onto the stage.
