= Dramacon =

Original English-language manga

- Cover of Dramacon vol. 1 (2005), art by Svetlana Chmakova
- Genre: Romantic comedy
- Author: Svetlana Chmakova
- Publisher: Tokyopop (North America and UK)
- Other publishers: Madman Entertainment (Australia) Albin Michel (France) Tokyopop Germany (Germany) Athenaeum 2000/Mangattack (Hungary) Edições Asa (Portugal) Pauna Media Group (Finland) SoftBank Creative (Japan)
- Demographic: Teens
- Original run: 2005–2007
- Volumes: 3

Dramacon is an original English-language manga written and illustrated by Svetlana Chmakova. It was published in three volumes by Tokyopop from October 11, 2005 to December 11, 2007. Dramacon is considered one of Tokyopop's best OEL manga.

== Plot ==
Dramacon focuses on Christie Leroux, a fledgling teenage writer who is debuting her manga with her artist boyfriend, Derek Hollman, at her first anime convention. Christie endures Derek ignoring her along with the culture shock of men in schoolgirl uniforms. During the three-day convention, Christie meets Lida Zeff, a famous manga artist and writer, who gives her advice on improving her manga, and Matt Green, a mysterious sun-glasses wearing cosplayer, whom she develops feelings for. Matt always wears sunglasses to conceal the fact that his eye is missing. Derek witnesses Matt and Christie kissing, and confronts her while drunk. During the argument, he attacks and attempts to rape her; however, she escapes to Matt's room, which leads Derek and Matt to fight. Christie spends her last day with Matt, his sister Sandra, and Greta, a friend of theirs. They have to wait another whole year before they see each other again since Christie is still in high school and lives on the east coast while Matt lives on the west coast and attends college.

A year later, Christie returns to the convention with Bethany, a new artist. Christie discovers that Matt now has a girlfriend named Emily. While Christie deals with her feelings for Matt, Bethany faces off with a disgruntled manga purist and is offered a job at Mangapop. Lida Zeff helps the two girls with advice for Bethany about living in a manga publishing world. Emily pulls off Matt's sunglasses in a crowded fast food restaurant after a feud with a bystander, and he is then horrified at the people staring at him, so he runs off. When Christie chases after him, Matt tells her to "piss off". The next day, Christie runs away from him when he tries to apologize, and refuses his kiss. They part without saying good-bye. Bethany and Christie leave the convention with a promise to cosplay the next year and to continue to work hard on their manga.

At the next convention, Christie meets up with Matt, but her friends follow her, and she constantly argues with Matt. She runs into Derek, which brings back the memories of him attacking her, but sees that he now has a pregnant fiancée. Matt and Christie try to control their tempers, with Matt particularly trying to hold his biting retorts, and they seem to have made up, even with Emily still around and finding ways to break into their dates as a form of payback for last year. Meanwhile, Bethany refuses to cosplay after learning that her mother is coming to the convention. She argues with her mother about her career choice; after her mom is in a car accident, Beth leaves the convention to be by her side in the hospital and they reconcile. Bethany gains her mother's blessing to pursue a job with Mangapop. Christie and company all leave the convention considerably happier than the past year.

== Development ==
The initial concept of Dramacon was about "a girl who meets a cosplayer, and there would be all kinds of obstacles and drama that they'd have to overcome." Svetlana Chmakova attended anime conventions regularly and came up with the concept of the series when she encountered the same cosplayer at the same convention for two years. She explained:

We didn't date or anything, we never even spoke. He doesn't even know who I am or anything, but the way writers' minds work, you just latch onto something like that and you build upon it. I thought, "What if this was a manga? And what if there was a manga character (who's not me)?" And that's how it happened.

Tokyopop discovered Chmakova through her web comic Chasing Rainbows, rather than through its annual Rising Stars of Manga competition, where many of its OEL manga authors were found. She wrote the first volume as "a piece of fluff" and "just wanted to have fun with it." She left the ending of the first volume open since she was unsure if other volumes would be published. While writing the series, she tried to make the story as realistic as possible. Chmakova also liked the idea of Dramacon being an anime, but did not think that it was likely to happen. Chmakova has moved on to create her next series, Nightschool, and says in regard to future volumes of Dramacon, "It is extremely unlikely it will ever happen because Tokyopop has a tight grip on the rights and is not currently publishing new titles."

== Release ==
Written and illustrated by Svetlana Chmakova, Dramacon is published by Tokyopop in three volumes from October 11, 2005 to December 11, 2007. Tokyopop later re-released in the series in one volume, Dramacon Ultimate Edition (ISBN 978-1-4278-1340-4), on October 7, 2008. Madman Entertainment distributes the series in New Zealand and Australia. Dramacon is also licensed in France by Albin Michel, in Germany by Tokyopop Germany, in Portugal by Edições Asa, in Hungary by Mangattack, in Finland by Pauna Media Group, and in Japan by Soft Bank Creative.

=== Volume list ===
No.	North American release date	North American ISBN
01	October 11, 2005	978-1-59816-129-8
Chapters 1–6
02	October 10, 2006	978-1-59816-130-4
Chapters 1–7
03	December 11, 2007	978-1-59816-131-1
Chapters 1–7
Ultimate Edition	October 2008	978-1-42781-340-4

== Reception ==
Dramacon was positively received by English-language readers. The second volume reached the 8th spot in Bookscan's Top 10 and reached the 89th spot on the list of the top 100 best-selling graphic novels with 1,155 copies sold. The third volume debuted at the 82nd spot with 1,246 copies sold.

Mike Toole of Anime Jump stated: "It's a comic that's sly and indulgent to anime fans, but still accessible, attractive, and wickedly funny." PopCultureShock's Erin Finnegan commented that the second Dramacon volume "is a compelling read, but at times it comes off more like an internet forum discussion than an actual volume of manga." Johanna Draper Carlson, a longtime reviewer for Publishers Weekly, recommended the first volume and described it as "an instant classic". Carlson listed the second volume as one of the best of 2006, but criticized the final volume for focusing mostly on Bethany's struggle as an aspiring artist instead of Matt and Christie's relationship.

=== Recognitions ===
Dramacon tied with Fred Gallagher's Megatokyo for About.com's Best Continuing OEL Manga of 2007. Dramacon was nominated for a 2006 Harvey Award, and a 2007 Will Eisner Award. It was also on the 2005 Publishers Weekly list of best comics, and YALSA picked it as one of the top graphic novels in 2007 for teens.
