= Sidescroller (disambiguation) =

Sidescroller usually refers to a side-scrolling video game.

Sidescroller may also refer to:

- SideScrollers, a graphic novel from Oni Press
- SideScrollers, a podcast on ScrewAttack
