= Scenes from Awajima =

Japanese manga series written and illustrated by Takako Shimura

- First tankōbon volume cover

淡島百景 (Awajima Hyakkei)
- Genre: Drama; Coming-of-age
- Manga
- Written by: Takako Shimura
- Published by: Ohta Publishing
- English publisher: NA: Yen Press
- Magazine: PocoPoco (June 7, 2011–2016); Ohta Web Comic (July 29, 2016–March 15, 2024)
- Original run: June 7, 2011 – March 15, 2024
- Volumes: 5
- Anime television series

A Hundred Scenes of Awajima
- Directed by: Morio Asaka
- Written by: Yasuhiro Nakanishi
- Music by: Takahiro Obata
- Studio: Madhouse
- Licensed by: Crunchyroll; Medialink
- Original network: Fuji TV, Kansai TV, THK, TNC, uhb, KSS, BS Fuji
- Original run: April 10, 2026 – June 26, 2026
- Episodes: 12
- icon

Scenes from Awajima (Japanese: 淡島百景, Hepburn: Awajima Hyakkei; lit. 'One Hundred Views of Awajima') is a Japanese manga series written and illustrated by Takako Shimura. The series was serialized on Ohta Publishing's PocoPoco website from June 2011 to 2016, and it moved to the Ohta Web Comic website, where it was serialized from July 2016 to March 2024. It was compiled into five tankōbon volumes from April 2015 to May 2024. An anime television series adaptation produced by Madhouse aired from April to June 2026.

== Plot ==
A coming-of-age story following the experiences of several girls at the acclaimed Awajima Opera School across years and decades, who hope to make their stage debuts. Their school experiences are filled with a mix of admiration, competition, growing friendship, and jealousy of each other's skills.

== Characters ==
Wakana Tabata (田畑 若菜, Tabata Wakana)
Voiced by: Niina Nakabayashi
A student who recently enrolled to Awajima with aspirations to become a theater star. Friendly and honest, she aims to dedicate herself to the school's rigorous studies.
Kinue Takehara (竹原 絹枝, Takehara Kinue)
Voiced by: Yō Taichi
A senior student of Awajima who is Wakana's roommate and the dorm supervisor. She has a passion for theater and carries the hopes of her best friend Ryoko.
Ryōko Ueda (上田 良子, Ueda Ryōko)
Voiced by: Ai Kayano
A former classmate of Kinue, during middle school, who told her to apply to Awajima, but decided to enroll elsewhere instead because she is jealous and admires Kinue.
Emi Okabe (岡部 絵美, Okabe Emi)
Voiced by: Natsumi Fujiwara
A student attending Awajima on a scholarship. Other students, such as Katsurako, harass her, causing her to isolate herself from everyone.
Katsurako Ibuki (伊吹 桂子, Ibuki Katsurako)
Voiced by: Ayumi Tsunematsu
A daughter from an elite family in the area of Awajima who is jealous of the talent that Okabe has.
Sara Takanashi (小鳥遊 紗羅, Takanashi Sara)
Voiced by: Kana Ichinose
A cheerful and friendly student who enrolled at Awajima after being inspired by Kinue's stage presence. She forms a close-knit trio with Eri and Shizuka.
Eri Fujisawa (藤原 江里, Fujisawa Eri)
Voiced by: Risa Shimizu
A student who transferred to Awajima after experiencing bad relationships in middle school. She also looks up to Kinue and trains alongside her friends Sara and Shizuka.
Shizuka Utagawa (雅楽川 静香, Utagawa Shizuka)
Voiced by: Asuna Tomari
A student who enrolled at Awajima to fulfill her longtime aspirations since middle school. She nurtures a fiery passion despite her reserved demeanor and hangs out with Sara and Eri.

== Media ==
=== Manga ===
Written and illustrated by Takako Shimura, Scenes from Awajima was originally serialized on Ohta Publishing's PocoPoco website from June 7, 2011, to 2016. It later moved to the Ohta Web Comic website where it continued from July 29, 2016, to March 15, 2024. Its chapters were collected into five tankōbon volumes from April 15, 2015, to May 13, 2024.

During their panel at Anime Expo 2025, Yen Press announced that they had licensed the series for English publication.

==== Volumes ====
No.	Original release date	Original ISBN	English release date	English ISBN
1	April 15, 2015	978-4-7783-2248-9	January 20, 2026	979-8-8554-2890-2
2	July 24, 2017	978-4-7783-2282-3	May 26, 2026	979-8-8554-2892-6
3	March 14, 2019	978-4-7783-2298-4	September 22, 2026	979-8-8554-2894-0
4	August 24, 2022	978-4-7783-2315-8	—	—
5	May 13, 2024	978-4-7783-2328-8	—	—

=== Anime ===
An anime adaptation was announced on May 9, 2024. It was later confirmed to be a television series produced by Madhouse and directed by Morio Asaka, with series composition by Yasuhiro Nakanishi, character designs by Kunihiko Hamada, and music by Takahiro Obata. It aired from April 10 to June 26, 2026, on Fuji TV and other networks, with each episode featuring standalone segments. (Note: Fuji TV lists the series premiere on April 9 at 25:45, which is effectively April 10 at 1:45 a.m. JST.) The opening theme song is "Blue Hour", performed by Hana Hope, and the ending theme song is "Hikari" (光; Light), performed by Mika Nakashima. Crunchyroll is streaming the series under the title A Hundred Scenes of Awajima. Medialink licensed the series in South-East Asia for streaming on Ani-One Asia's YouTube channel.

==== Episodes ====
No.	Title	Directed by	Written by	Storyboarded by	Original release date
1	"Wakana Tabata and Prince Takehara"; Transliteration: "Tabata Wakana to Takehara ōji" (Japanese: 田畑若菜と竹原王子)	Kouki Uchinomiya	Yasuhiro Nakanishi	Morio Asaka	April 10, 2026
1	"Kinue Takehara and Ryōko Ueda"; Transliteration: "Takehara Kinue to Ueda Ryōko" (Japanese: 竹原絹枝と上田良子)	Kouki Uchinomiya	Yasuhiro Nakanishi	Morio Asaka	April 10, 2026
Wakana Tabata moves into the dorms of Awajima Opera School to fulfill her dreams of becoming a theater star and meets her roommate and senior Kinue Takehara. Wakana becomes acquainted with her peers and learns during her first day of Awajima's students spreading gossip about each other. Kinue tells Wakana of the cutthroat environment in Awajima that drives students to reach the top at the expense of others, worrying Wakana. Kinue adds that she remains unsure of her future before recounting to Wakana on her past with her best friend Ryōko Ueda. In a flashback, Kinue and Ryōko are members of their school's drama club. They gain the titular roles for a Romeo and Juliet play to their joy and begin practicing, with Kinue taking her acting seriously. Kinue shares her desire to enroll at Awajima with Ryōko, causing Ryōko to realize Kinue's greater commitment to theater. Ryōko is unable to enroll at Awajima, saddening Kinue. They reunite sometime later and Ryōko internalizes her jealousy and admiration for Kinue's drive being her reason to not join her at Awajima, as the two girls reenact a scene from Romeo and Juliet.
2	"Emi Okabe and Yukie Onoda"; Transliteration: "Okabe Emi to Onoda Yukie" (Japanese: 岡部絵美と小野田幸恵)	Kotono Watanabe	Yasuhiro Nakanishi	Kotono Watanabe	April 17, 2026
2	"Katsurako Ibuki and Wakana Tabata"; Transliteration: "Ibuki Katsurako to Tabata Wakana" (Japanese: 伊吹桂子と田畑若菜)	Kotono Watanabe	Yasuhiro Nakanishi	Kotono Watanabe	April 17, 2026
Years prior, Emi Okabe was a student of Awajima renowned for her talent and being friends with fellow students Yukie Onoda and Katsurako Ibuki. Yukie begins to love and envy Emi, but Katsurako has her join her clique in bullying Emi. After Emi lashes out at Katsurako, Yukie pleads she make amends out of fear of Katsurako's retribution and indirectly tells her to quit Awajima. Yukie expresses guilt for her actions in Emi's departure as she meets Emi one last time before her death. Emi voices resentment towards herself, Yukie, and Katsurako for the events, and she starts a family and passes away some years later. Etsuko Urakami, Kinue's aunt and one of Emi's friends who was saddened by her absence in Awajima, learns of the circumstances following Emi's funeral, when her widowed husband gives her a letter from Yukie kept by Emi recounting their troubled past. Etsuko decides to support Kinue's enrollment at Awajima to honor Emi's memory. In the present, Wakana approaches an older Katsurako, who has now become a teacher, for permission to leave Awajima with her friends. Despite being told of her intimidating reputation, Wakana sees Katsurako's calmness and wonders on her past.
3	"Katsurako Ibuki and Natsuko Kusanagi"; Transliteration: "Ibuki Katsurako to Kusanagi Natsuko" (Japanese: 伊吹桂子と日柳夏子)	Kouki Mori	Yasuhiro Nakanishi	Gin-san	April 24, 2026
3	"Ruriko Yamaji and Natsuko Kusanagi"; Transliteration: "Yamaji Ruriko to Kusanagi Natsuko" (Japanese: 山路ルリ子と日柳夏子)	Kouki Mori	Yasuhiro Nakanishi	Gin-san	April 24, 2026
Wakana shares her admiration for Katsurako's talent and remarks she does not see her as intimidating, causing Katsurako to recall being berated by her grandmother Natsuko Kusanagi. Katsurako grew bitter and indifferent after her death, and realized she inherited Natsuko's callousness when Emi lashed out at her. Katsurako was unable to apologize to Emi following her passing and became ostracized by her clique. Despite these, Katsurako continues to guide students, and questions if she is seeking redemption. Ruriko Yamaji, Natsuko's daughter and Katsurako's mother, reflects on her mother's legacy and presence within her life, from her time in Awajima to marrying an interviewer. Ruriko tries to reassure a young Katsurako not to be influenced by Natsuko's callousness to no avail, and she learns from a dying Natsuko of Katsurako wishing for her death. When Natsuko points out she shares Katsurako's bitterness, Ruriko is forced to confront her true feelings and acknowledges that she despised Natsuko. However, Ruriko continues to love Natsuko and thanks her for teaching her how to love.
4	"Kayo Yomogida and Saori Yamagata"; Transliteration: "Yomogida Kayo to Yamagata Saori" (Japanese: 四方木田かよと山県沙織)	Atsuko Ishizuka	Yuniko Ayana	Atsuko Ishizuka	May 1, 2026
4	"Wakana Tabata and Saeko Tabata"; Transliteration: "Tabata Wakana to Tabata Saeko" (Japanese: 田畑若菜と田畑佐江子)	Atsuko Ishizuka	Yuniko Ayana	Atsuko Ishizuka	May 1, 2026
4	"Takuto Kashiwagi and Sayaka Yoshimura"; Transliteration: "Kashiwagi Takuto to Yoshimura Sayaka" (Japanese: 柏木拓人と吉村さやか)	Atsuko Ishizuka	Yuniko Ayana	Atsuko Ishizuka	May 1, 2026
Kayo Yomogida and Saori Yamagata are two women who formerly performed as a duo during their time in Awajima. They were often teased as a couple, but Kayo unceremoniously retired much to Saori's frustration. After both seek work at Kayo's agency and take different careers, Saori sets out to depend on Kayo less and make her mark as Yūki Kaburagi, enthralling Kayo. Wakana's mother Saeko wonders on her daughter's prospects of becoming a star in Awajima. Wakana arrives home to see Saeko watching recordings of Awajima's plays despite her interest in stand-up comedy. Saeko comments on Wakana's potential for theater, prompting Wakana to reflect on Kinue's words and strive to work harder. Takuto Kashiwagi is an introverted boy who deeply admires the talent of Awajima's students. His grandmother invites him to watch an Awajima stage play but is hospitalized. With no friends to bring along, Takuto resorts to inviting Sayaka Yoshimura, whom he only talked to online. Takuto imagines Sayaka as a beautiful girl, but discovers they are also a boy upon meeting him in person. Despite the misunderstanding, the two boys connect on their shared admiration for Awajima and aspiration to enroll despite their gender, allowing Takuto to befriend Sayaka.
5	"Asami Ōkubo"; Transliteration: "Ōkubo Asami" (Japanese: 大久保あさ美)	Shinichi Tabe	Yasuhiro Nakanishi	Kotono Watanabe	May 8, 2026
5	"Midori Asaka and Leo Asagami"; Transliteration: "Asaka Midori to Asagami Reo" (Japanese: 浅香みどりと浅上レオ)	Shinichi Tabe	Yasuhiro Nakanishi	Kotono Watanabe	May 8, 2026
Asami Ōkubo experiences difficulty reconciling her religious upbringing and her devout parents even as they support her. Asami ruminates on not being allowed to live a normal life growing up, causing her to close herself off from others. She gradually begins to resent her parents and their religion upon entering Awajima and becomes the subject of gossip. Asami opens up to her roommate of her conflicting feelings, and her roommate advises on becoming independent from her parents. Asami aspires to call her parents of her intention to walk her own path and make her own decisions, as she sings a song beautifully. Midori Asaka is enamored by the talent and beauty of acclaimed theater actress Reona Tsukasa. Midori enters Awajima and dreams of performing onstage with Reona, but is disheartened when Reona announces her retirement from theater. Despite this setback, Midori sets her sights on taking up the same types of roles that Reona took. Inspired by Reona's prowess, Midori decides on calling her stage name Leo Asagami and begins her theater career. Some years later, Midori is given a chance to meet Reona, who expresses delight at Midori honoring her with her stage name.
6	"Awajima Ghost Stories"; Transliteration: "Awajima Kaidan" (Japanese: 淡島怪談)	Kouki Uchinomiya	Yasuhiro Nakanishi	Kouki Uchinomiya	May 15, 2026
Awajima prepares for its cultural festival and the seniors practice for a rendition of Romeo and Juliet. Kinue invites Ryōko to watch, and they wistfully look back at their performance. Several students and alumni reflect on the school's cutthroat nature and their uncertain futures, as rumors form around the various ghost stories which haunt Awajima. Katsurako remarks to her fellow faculty staff that the stories are manifestations of the students' hopes and failures, and she reflects on being ostracized in the aftermath of Emi's departure. Later at the cultural festival, Ryōko and other patrons arrive at Awajima to watch Romeo and Juliet, where Ryōko witnesses Kinue's stellar acting. Kinue laments to Ryōko after the play on continuing on as an actor without her. Ryōko finally admits on her jealousy for Kinue's drive, flustering the latter as Ryōko remarks she got to open up on her true thoughts. Meanwhile, Katsurako regretfully shares with a former classmate that they cannot be able to apologize to Emi for bullying her after her death.
7	"Saori Yamagata and Mikako Takeuchi"; Transliteration: "Yamagata Saori to Takeuchi Mikako" (Japanese: 山県沙織と武内実花子)	Kotono Watanabe	Yuniko Ayana	Kotono Watanabe	May 22, 2026
7	"Mikako Takeuchi and Saori Yamagata"; Transliteration: "Takeuchi Mikako to Yamagata Saori" (Japanese: 武内実花子と山県沙織)	Kotono Watanabe	Yuniko Ayana	Kotono Watanabe	May 22, 2026
Kayo visits Saori in the hospital, and the latter laments on losing a major role to their former classmate Mikako Takeuchi. Saori remembers Mikako remarking on the limited number of chances to gain the leading role, as she performs Romeo and Juliet while being debilitated by a fever. She later watches an interview with Mikako regarding her return to acting after taking a long hiatus. Mikako reflects on enrolling at Awajima in spite of her recurrent illness, where she befriends Saori and Kayo. Mikako excitedly calls her mother on sharing the leading role for Romeo and Juliet with Saori, only for her fever to flare up again. Mikako calms Saori's concerns and performs the play, later promising to Saori and Kayo on performing together onstage. However, her worsening fever causes her to quit to recover. Saori takes over Mikako's roles and gains fame as Yūki, leaving Saori with mixed feelings. Mikako and Saori reunite and confide in each other of their regrets and failures. Mikako reveals how her mother remained grateful and supportive of Saori acting in her place, surprising Saori. After being discharged, Saori shares the leading role with Mikako for an upcoming production.
8	"Sara Takanashi"; Transliteration: "Takanashi Sara" (Japanese: 小鳥遊沙羅)	Mitsuyuki Mashura & Hwang Iljin	Yasuhiro Nakanishi	Gin-san	May 29, 2026
8	"Eri Fujisawa"; Transliteration: "Fujisawa Eri" (Japanese: 藤沢江里)	Mitsuyuki Mashura & Hwang Iljin	Yasuhiro Nakanishi	Gin-san	May 29, 2026
8	"Shizuka Utagawa"; Transliteration: "Utagawa Shizuka" (Japanese: 雅楽川静香)	Mitsuyuki Mashura & Hwang Iljin	Yasuhiro Nakanishi	Gin-san	May 29, 2026
Sara Takanashi asks Ryōko, who has recently married into the family, about Kinue. Sara learns that Kinue is a graduate of Awajima and currently performs with her family's last name as Akira Takanashi. Sara becomes inspired to also enroll at the school, where she endears herself to her peers with her friendly and passionate demeanor. Eri Fujisawa shares that she entered Awajima to establish her new identity but secretly admits she enrolled due to also idolizing Kinue. Eri quickly befriends Sara and Shizuka Utagawa, who cautions them to not reveal their relations to famous individuals. Shizuka's advice causes Eri to recall her tumultuous friendship with a former classmate. Shizuka also connects with Eri on the complicated nature of relationships, as Sara invites them to watch a recording of Ryōko's wedding with Kinue as a guest. In a flashback to middle school, Shizuka bonds with her class on their adoration for Saori. She becomes shocked at them callously mocking their classmate Kanon Sasaki, who is related to an acclaimed scriptwriter. Shizuka tried to remain neutral but intervened after seeing one of the bullies ask Kanon for favors in getting close to a celebrity. Kanon thanks Shizuka for defending her and supports her career at Awajima, leaving Shizuka glad.
9	"Awajima Cultural Festival"; Transliteration: "Awajima Bunkasai" (Japanese: 淡島文化祭)	Atsuko Ishizuka	Yuniko Ayana	Atsuko Ishizuka	June 5, 2026
9	"Akiho Kashiwabara and Wakana Tabata"; Transliteration: "Kashiwabara Akiho to Tabata Wakana" (Japanese: 柏原明穂と田畑若菜)	Atsuko Ishizuka	Yuniko Ayana	Atsuko Ishizuka	June 5, 2026
Sara, Eri, and Shizuka prepare for their batch's cultural festival at Awajima, and they discuss who will be the guest speaker. The trio learns that the speaker is Wakana, who is revealed to have switched career paths from performing with Awajima's theater troupe to becoming a writer. Hearing this, they think on how their future careers will change. Wakana reunites with Katsurako, and the latter congratulates her on her current success as a writer. Wakana narrates to Awajima's students on spending time with her junior Akiho Kashiwabara, who is the daughter of renowned celebrities. Akiho began wondering if her parents' affection was genuine after her parents become caught in controversial affairs. Despite being treated as an outcast after entering Awajima, she expressed surprise at Wakana's humility and friendliness. Akiho opens up to Wakana on wanting to take up a career that is different from her parents. After Wakana's graduation, Akiho became a role model for Sara, Eri, and Shizuka's batch as Satsuki Yaotose, inspiring them to work harder.
10	"Shinji Hasegawa and Utako Natsuki"; Transliteration: "Hasegawa Shinji to Natsuki Utako" (Japanese: 長谷川慎爾と夏木詩子)	Shinichi Tabe	Yasuhiro Nakanishi	Kotono Watanabe	June 12, 2026
10	"Fumiko Shiro's Daughter"; Transliteration: "Shiro Fumiko no Musume" (Japanese: 城芙美子の娘)	Shinichi Tabe	Yasuhiro Nakanishi	Kotono Watanabe	June 12, 2026
10	"Katsurako Ibuki and Emi Okabe"; Transliteration: "Ibuki Katsurako to Okabe Emi" (Japanese: 伊吹桂子と岡部絵美)	Shinichi Tabe	Yasuhiro Nakanishi	Kotono Watanabe	June 12, 2026
In an interview with Wakana, Shinji Hasegawa retells how he became a scriptwriter following an impromptu suggestion from his mother and Awajima graduate Utako Natsuki. Shinji would then admit his tendency to embellish his stories of Utako, adding he aspired to be like her. Shinji returns home to his family, revealing that Utako is a meek and endearing mother who also entertained Shinji's descriptions of her character. Yukari Takimoto, the daughter of ballet instructor Fumiko Shiro, is saddened at her failure to pass Awajima's entrance exams. Yukari reflects on not being able to live up to her peers' expectations in spite of her mother's fame. Nevertheless, she strives to retake the exams on her own terms. Katsurako reminisces on meeting Emi during their time in Awajima. She acknowledges Emi's beauty and prowess, noting that she resembled Natsuko. Katsurako befriended her and sought her approval, while also dreaming to perform alongside Emi. However, Yukie, whom Katsurako notes a similarity to Ruriko's mediocrity, was chosen alongside Emi as leads for a play. Katsurako grew jealous of her, which was exacerbated by Emi defending Yukie's skills. Upon being reminded by Natsuko's callousness, Katsurako began avoiding Emi. This evolved into the students bullying Emi and ruining her reputation, with Katsurako being labeled as its ringleader. After recounting her trauma, a bedridden Katsurako asks Wakana if she has regrets on enrolling at Awajima.
11	"Emi Okabe and Katsurako Ibuki"; Transliteration: "Okabe Emi to Ibuki Katsurako" (Japanese: 岡部絵美と伊吹桂子)	Hyūga Yamamura	Yasuhiro Nakanishi	Hyūga Yamamura	June 19, 2026
Wakana expresses satisfaction on her time studying in Awajima even after not succeeding in theater. Hearing this, Katsurako fully confesses her involvement in Emi's bullying and asks Wakana to document them to atone for her actions. Despite her shock and the weight of the request, Wakana begins by contacting Emi's family. Emi's family voices their pain and resentment towards Katsurako mistreating her, adding that they wished to know what Emi felt in its aftermath. They allow Wakana to write about Emi in the hopes of bringing light to her talent, but Wakana is troubled on how to handle the book in good faith. She meets with Kayoko Yanagihara, an editor and Awajima alum who saw Wakana's cultural festival guest panel. Kayoko and Wakana connect on their difficult experiences at Awajima and work on the book. Meanwhile, Katsurako quietly apologizes to her family, Emi, and Yukie for her past behavior before passing away. Wakana attends Katsurako's funeral and looks back on her legacy. Although she admits to Kinue that her next work may shatter Awajima's prestige, Wakana publishes the book featuring Emi, Yukie, and Katsurako's memoirs.
12	"A Hundred Scenes of Awajima"; Transliteration: "Awajima Hyakkei" (Japanese: 淡島百景)	Kotono Watanabe	Yasuhiro Nakanishi	Kotono Watanabe	June 26, 2026
Wakana narrates that the book left an impact to Awajima's students, alumni, and fans, but she laments that her hopes of bringing recognition to Emi's talent were insufficient. Wakana apologizes to Emi's family, though Emi's husband shares his gratefulness for memorializing Emi. Wakana is left overwhelmed by the book's aftermath as Kayoko informs her of a proposal to have Awajima adapt their book into a stage play. Awajima accepts the offer, leaving a surprised Wakana hopeful that the play would bring nuance to the school's complicated image. While audience reaction is divisive towards the decision to reenact a real-life account of bullying in Awajima, an older Sara, Eri, and Shizuka earnestly practice their parts for the play, with Kinue lending her acting as well. Wakana and Kinue later discuss how they became complicit with Awajima's cutthroat environment in the pursuit for fame. They conclude that they all sought hope in the face of hardship, as Awajima begins the play. In a flashback after her final meeting with Yukie, Emi tearfully reflects on their trauma before steeling herself and moving on with her life.

== Reception ==
The series was ranked 17th in the 2016 edition of Takarajimasha's Kono Manga ga Sugoi! guidebook of the best manga for female readers.
