= Don Brown (children's author) =

American author and illustrator (born 1949)

- Born: 1949 (age 76–77)
- Occupations: Author and illustrator
- Children: 2
- Writing career
- Notable awards: William Allen White Children's Book Award (2014); NCTE Orbis Pictus Award (2016); YALSA Award for Excellence in Nonfiction (2019)

Don Brown (born 1949) is an American author and illustrator of children's books.

== Awards and honors ==
Sixteen of Brown's books are Junior Library Guild selections: Kid Blink Beats the World (2004), The Good Lion (2005), Bright Path (2006), Teedie (2009), A Wizard from the Start (2010), Gold! Gold from the American River! (2011), Henry and the Cannons (2013), The Great American Dust Bowl (2014), He has Shot the President! (2014), Drowned City (2015),Aaron and Alexander (2016), The Unwanted (2018), Up and Down (2018), Rocket to the Moon (2019), Fever Year: The Killer Flu of 1918 (2020), and In the Shadow of the Fallen Towers (2021).

Many of Brown's books have also been included on lists of the best books of the year. In 2013, Henry and the Cannons was included on School Library Journal's list of the best nonfiction books of the year, and The Great American Dust Bowl was included on lists of the best books of year by Kirkus Reviews and Horn Book. In 2015, Aaron and Alexander was included on School Library Journal's list of the best books of year. Additionally, Drowned City was included on lists of the best books of the year by Booklist, Chicago Public Library, Horn Book Magazine, Kirkus Reviews, New York Public Library, Publishers Weekly, and School Library Journal. In 2018, Unwanted was included on lists of the best books of the year by Horn Book Magazine, Kirkus Reviews, the New York Public Library, and Shelf Awareness. In 2019, Rocket to the Moon was on Kirkus Reviews's best books of the year.

Awards for Brown's writing
Year	Title	Award	Result	Ref.
2005	Odd Boy Out	ALSC Notable Children's Books	Selection	
2007	Dolley Madison Saves George Washington	Cybils Award	Nominee	
2009	Mack Made Movies	ALSC Notable Children's Books	Selection	
2011	America is Under Attack	Cybils Award	Nominee	
2012	America is Under Attack	ALSC Notable Children's Books	Selection	
2013	The Great American Dust Bowl	Bulletin Blue Ribbon	Recipient	
2014	America is Under Attack	William Allen White Children's Book Award	Winner	
2015	Drowned City	Booklist Editors' Choice: Books for Youth	Selection	
2015	Drowned City	Bulletin Blue Ribbon	Recipient	
2015	Drowned City	Cybils Award	Nominee	
2015	Drowned City	Los Angeles Times Book Prize for Young Adult Literature	Finalist	
2016	Drowned City	Will Eisner Comic Industry Awards for Best Publication for Teens	Finalist	
2016	Drowned City	Great Graphic Novels for Teens	Top 10	
2016	Drowned City	NCTE Orbis Pictus Award	Winner	
2016	Drowned City	Notable Books for a Global Society	Winner	
2016	Drowned City	ALSC Notable Children's Books	Selection	
2016	Drowned City	Sibert Medal	Honor	
2017	Drowned City	Vermont Golden Dome Book Award	Nominee	
2018	Drowned City	Rebecca Caudill Young Readers' Book Award	Nominee	
2018	Older than Dirt	ALSC Notable Children's Books	Selection	
2019	The Unwanted	ALSC Notable Children's Books	Selection	
2019	The Unwanted	Great Graphic Novels for Teens	Top 10	
2019	The Unwanted	Middle East Book Award for Youth Non-Fiction	Winner	
2019	The Unwanted	Outstanding Books for the College Bound	Selection	
2019	The Unwanted	Sibert Medal	Honor	
2019	The Unwanted	YALSA Award for Excellence in Nonfiction	Winner	
2022	In the Shadow of the Fallen Towers	Cybils Award	Finalist	
2022	In the Shadow of the Fallen Towers	Great Graphic Novels for Teens	Selection	
2022	In the Shadow of the Fallen Towers	YALSA Award for Excellence in Nonfiction	Honor	

== Publications ==
=== Historical fiction ===
- Our Time on the River (2003)
- The Notorious Izzy Fink (2006)
- The Train Jumper (2007)

=== Nonfiction for older readers ===
- Distress! All Stations!: April 15, 1912: The Day the Titanic Sank (2008)
- Let it Begin Here!: April 19, 1775: The Day the American Revolution Began (2008)
- America is Under Attack: September 11, 2001: The Day the Towers Fell (2011)
- Gold! Gold from the American River!: January 24, 1848: The Day the Gold Rush Began (2011)
- The Great American Dustbowl (2013)
- He has Shot the President!: April 14, 1865: The Day John Wilkes Booth Killed President Lincoln (2014)
- Drowned City: Hurricane Katrina and New Orleans (2015)
- Older than Dirt: A Wild but True History of Earth with Michael R. Perfit (2017)
- The Unwanted: Stories of the Syrian Refugees (2018)
- Rocket to the Moon (2019)
- Fever Year: The Killer Flu of 1918 (2019)
- Machines that Think (2020)
- A Shot in the Arm (2021)
- In the Shadow of the Fallen Towers: The Seconds, Minutes, Hours, Days, Weeks, Months, and Years after the 9/11 Attacks (2021)

=== Nonfiction for younger readers ===
- Ruth Law Thrills a Nation (1993)
- Alice Ramey's Grand Adventure (1997)
- Rare Treasure: Mary Anning and Her Remarkable Discoveries (1999)
- One Giant Leap: The Story of Neil Armstrong (2001)
- A Voice from the Wilderness: The Story of Anna Howard Shaw (2001)
- Across a Dark & Wild Sea, illustrated by Deborah Nadel (2002)
- Far Beyond the Garden Gate: Alexandra David-Neel's Journey to Lhasa (2002)
- American Boy: The Adventures of Mark Twain (2003)
- Mack Made Movies (2003)
- Uncommon Traveler: Mary Kingsley in Africa (2003)
- Kid Blink Beats the World (2004)
- Odd Boy Out: Young Albert Einstein (2004)
- The Good Lion, written by Beryl Markham (2005)
- Bright Path: Young Jim Thorpe (2006)
- Dolley Madison Saves George Washington (2007)
- Teedie: The Story of Young Teddy Roosevelt (2008)
- A Kid's Guide to Chicago, written by Karen Bartlett (2010)
- A Wizard from the Start: The Incredible Boyhood and Amazing Inventions of Thomas Edison (2010)
- The Boy Who Went to Bed Round and Woke Up Square by Evan Rothman (2011)
- Henry & the Cannons: An Extraordinary True Story of the American Revolution (2013)
- Aaron & Alexander: The Most Famous Duel in American History (2015)
- Up & Down: The Adventures of John Jeffries, First American to Fly (2018)
