= Nightschool (comics) =

Original English-language manga

- Cover of Nightschool: The Weirn Books vol. 1 (2009), art by Svetlana Chmakova
- Genre: Horror
- Author: Svetlana Chmakova
- Illustrator: Svetlana Chmakova
- Publisher: Yen Press (North America and the United Kingdom)
- Demographic: Teens
- Magazine: Yen Plus
- Original run: 2008–2010
- Collected volumes: 4

Nightschool: The Weirn Books is a supernatural original English-language manga written and illustrated by Svetlana Chmakova. The chapters appear as a serial in the monthly manga magazine Yen Plus, which collects the chapters in bound volumes. The first was released in April 2009.

== Plot ==
"Nightschool answers the age-old question — Where do demons get their diplomas?" The main setting of this series is at a building called the Nightschool. This is an ordinary high school during the day that transforms at sundown into a safe institution for Weirns (witches born with a demon “astral” bound to them) Vampires, Werewolves and other supernatural beings. The teachers conduct classes that teach a number of magic-based skills as well as common curricula (math, science, etc.) throughout the night. The main character of the series is a teenage girl named Alex, who is a weirn. She does not initially attend the Nightschool, for an unknown reason, and appears to be part of a mysterious prophecy. After her sister takes the night keeper post at the school and goes missing, Alex begins to wonder if the school had something to do with her disappearance. Alex enrolls as a new student to investigate and find her sister.

== Characters ==
Alexius "Alex" Treveney
Alex is a Weirn. She lives with Sarah, her older sister, and her astral. Her astral appears to be some sort of guardian as briefly mentioned on page 51 in chapter two. She is home schooled by Sarah although she is mainly left to her own devices. Her skill with her astral, and likely in general, are very advanced. In her first class she annoys her teacher, a she-demon, by belittling the lesson. Alex is then given the final and finds herself falling out of the sky without warning or instructions to save herself. She saves herself by transforming her astral into wings. The teacher declares her skill to be "university level, at least".

Alex, at times, says or does things and wonders why or forgets entirely. This is first discovered when she somehow steals time from three hunters, then finds herself at home and can't remember anything after meeting them. Although she appears to be a mean person, she loves her sister with extreme devotion. She is very bitter about something that prevents her from working with other students and hates it being mentioned. She is one of the Sohrem, and is the person Marina (another of the Sohrem) keeps referring to. Daemon said that her hair was originally brown, and various actions suggest that Alex's white hair is the result of a curse, including a reference by Sarah to an event that happened three years ago. After her sister's disappearance, Alex became homeless after she couldn't prove that she and her sister owned the apartment they live in. When visiting Ronee and Rochelle, Alex learned about Rochelle's special condition and why Ronee rules the school "with an iron fist." She also explained to the two sisters about her own condition. When she was younger, her best friend died and blamed it on Alex. The friend's mother cursed Alex at the funeral with the Neren Hex and she woke up with white hair. The mother was arrested and inhibited before she could reverse the curse, however, and now Alex cannot say that she "likes" or "loves" something, because it will explode. It is likely that this curse is what made Alex a Sohrem. When the Nightschool became temporarily closed, Alex had no way of knowing this and bumped into Eron, Ronee, Sion and Remy. After Ronee explained that Rochelle, like Sarah, had disappeared and that Remy had found the spell for opening the gate, Alex and Ronee went with Eron to the swamp they saw before. After they found Sarah and Rochelle, Eron revealed that this was a trap and captured them, introducing them to his "friends", who were Mr. Roi's old companions.

Sarah Treveney
Alex's older sister. Like Alex, she is also able to use magic and has an astral, because she is also a weirn. Sarah is the new Night Guardian at the Nightschool. She loves Alex with a fiery passion and is working on getting her to go back to school. She has slowly been rising in popularity at the new school due to the opening of after school clubs and coming up with ideas such as sketching vampires so they can be put in the yearbook even though they can't be photographed. After speaking with a group of Weirns who work at the school, she is visited by Erin. Erin leads her into a strange doorway in the floor which seals behind her. Absolutely all information is erased from everyone's minds of her except for Alex's and Ronee's. When Ronee, Eron, and Alex went into the swamp, Alex found her asleep with a pulse.

=== Students ===
Nicholas
A vampire who goes to the school, but usually skips classes. He has been dating a human goth girl who is a "vampire rights activist". He was injured protecting her from Rippers but quickly recovered.

Ronee Leiburne
A weirn student at the Nightschool. She is the last person to see Sarah prior to her disappearance. Like all weirns, she has an astral. She is the ‘leader’ of a popular Weirn group, and is a member of the Sohrem. She notices that Sarah has disappeared, although she pretends otherwise. Ronee has a sister named Rochelle. In an interview with Svetlana Chmakova, she says that Ronee's name is pronounced Renee. Whenever Rochelle cries or is upset, Ronee experiences intense pain. This is a rare family condition. This is also likely the burden she carries that made her a Sohrem. When Rochelle disappeared, Ronee, Sion, and Remy went to the Nightschool and bumped into Alex and Eron. After Ronee explained that Rochelle, like Sarah, had disappeared and that Remy had found the spell for opening the gate, Alex and Ronee went with Eron to the swamp they saw before. After they found Sarah and Rochelle, Eron revealed that this was a trap and captured them, introducing them to his "friends", who were Mr. Roi's old companions.

Remy
A demon. Remy is the only male and the only non-weirn in Ronee's clique. He is apparently good at hacking, as he said that he would be able to access the Shadow records when Ronee asked him if he could look up Alex's record. After some time, he managed to find all but two of the symbols for opening the gate. When Rochelle disappeared, Remy found the spell combination for the gate and went with Sion and Ronee to the Nightschool. When Eron sealed the gate, Remy lost all of his memories of Ronee and Alex. He and Sion were then faced by the Hunters.

Sion
A weirn. Sion is a girl in Ronee's clique. She and Remy went with Ronee to the Nightschool after Rochelle had disappeared in a manner similar to Sarah. When Eron closed the gate to the swamp Sion lost all of her memories of Ronee and Alex. She and Remy were then faced by the Hunters.

Rochelle Leiburne
Rochelle is Ronee's sister. She is happy-go-lucky and friendly, and is the opposite of Ronee. She has a rare magical condition that comes from the bloodline; if she cries, her sister is overcome with extreme pain that could become fatal. After the school was suspended for not having a Night Keeper for a month, Rochelle decided to tell Alex, since she would have no way of knowing. After going to the school with Erin, she was forced into the same gate Sarah went into. When Ronee came to the school to look for her, she, Eron, and Alex went into the swamp, and Ronee found her with a pulse.

Erin/Eron
Erin/Eron is a shapeshifter. Erin has wings sprouting from his back and black eyes. He tricked Sarah into going into a strange doorway in the floor. When Mr. Roi didn't show up for class, Madame Chen assigned a study period and put Eron in charge, despite his protests. He seems rather young. He remembers Sarah, so he is possibly a Sohrem. He also seemed to have a crush on Sarah. Eron also has access to teacher information, as he later called Ronee to question her about an experience she and Alex shared. After she informed him about it, he believed it was a bog in a different dimension since Ronee stated that there wasn't a sky. When Ronee questioned if he was just wasting her time after he had told her that someone had Alex's phone, he hung up stating that he would look up the bog. Erin later forced Rochelle into the same gate. When Alex, Sion, Ronee, and Remy showed up at the school, Remy opened the gate and Eron, Alex and Ronee went into it, finding Sarah and Rochelle. Eron then revealed that this was a trap and captured them, introducing them to his "friends", who were Mr. Roi's old companions. Eron revealed that he broke the seal. After the combined might of the Hunters, Alex, and Ronee fought Roi's old companions, the Sohrem got out of control and Eron tried repeatedly to close the seal, to no effect. This resulted in Eron being confronted by Daemon, Mr. Roi and Sue Chen. Mr. Roi then revealed that Eron was his little brother.

=== Teachers ===
Sue Chen
Night Principal of the Nightschool. She has the ability to work magic and appears to be always at school. She was later forced to close the Nightschool after someone (Erin) anonymous informed the Board of Education that the school had had no Night Keeper for a month. She is one of the Nereshai, or Night Lords.

Mrs. Hatcher
Day Keeper of the Nightschool and is currently teaching Sarah Treveney the basics of being a Night Guardian. She has the ability to work magic and can open and close the school using her powers. She later talked to Madame Chen about the sudden closing of the school.

Lars Kristepher
A teacher at Nightschool who is a vampire. He is constantly chasing after women, especially Sarah Treveney, whom he went to school with. Everyone knows he is truly interested in their necks, though, as he was constantly talking to Sarah's neck rather than her face, implying he still has urges to suck blood from people’s necks the way vampires did in folklore. He is Rochelle's teacher.

Mrs. Murrey
A teacher at the Nightschool who teaches Astral Control, which is mandatory for all weirns. She was Alex's teacher before realising that Alex's astral control was University Level. She is extremely sarcastic and very strict about rules, often to the annoyance of Mrs. Chen.

Mr. Roi
A teacher at Nightschool who is extremely famous. He is one of the most powerful magic users and is very headstrong. His lessons require much space that the Nightschool does not provide, thus resulting in constantly 'wrecking the school', although he is considerate and always repairs it afterward. Sarah Treveney may or may not have a crush on him, and he has shown very slight interest, if not amusement. He is extremely powerful and is millennia old. He was one of the three who sealed the Sohrem away. He attempted to research the Sohrem, but lost the trail when his two companions sought to kill him in a power play. He has a connection to Daemon, doing research for him and granting sanctuary to the hunters in exchange for being 'even', and seems quite happy with that deal. Mr. Roi is Eron's older brother, and also a Nereshai.

=== Hunters ===
These appear to be humans that are trained in magical arts and demonology in order to protect other humans from the ‘demonic races’ from the Night Realm. There is reference to a treaty, which all demonic beings must adhere to. For example, there is a rule against possession. Breaking this treaty means destruction at the hands of a hunter. The hunter acts as judge, jury and executioner. All hunters have physical powers far above normal humans, and seem to be able to use some form of energy in battle. Daemon has also shown the power to heal himself and has taught his student various magics, such as making doubles. They are also weak to a poison called veres, made from the blood of hunters who have killed humans. Doing so causes a very painful death. Non fatal injuries cause a more minor reaction and can allow for resistance to build up. The three students who have had their time taken away by Alex's Sohrem would die in three days if they did not wake up.

Cassidy O'Rourke
Hunter in-training. He is apprenticed to Daemon. He uses two short jagged blades with inscriptions upon it. He is one of the two best Hunters. He wears glasses, and has short orange hair. His nickname is Cass.

Daemon
Teacher and leader of the Hunters, humans who protect others from the "Night things.". He is the first to hear of Marina's vision. Although he is greatly feared by "Night Things", he is greatly respected by those he teaches. He is also referred to as, "Old Man" or "The Old Man". He is rumored to be immune to bullets, able to break bones just by looking at someone, and defeat an army by himself. In reality, bullets are torn to bits before they reach him, he does not need to look at people to break their bones, and claims that he could level the city, and is some times tempted. He is able to survive absorbing the toxins that were disabling all his students.

There is a chance he may now be the alpha-male of a Shifter pack since the leader challenged him and lost. He is a Night Lord, a being of extreme power, and helped seal the Sohrem.

Jay
A hunter in-training apprenticed to Daemon. He is one of the newest members and not particularly strong, as he is referred to as a "lightweight". He currently has his time taken away from him after a confrontation with Alex Treveney. He was saved in the 4th book via the Reave.

Jaq
A hunter in-training apprenticed to Daemon. He seems to have a sixth sense or some sort of power that allows him to figure when something is wrong, as he notices that something was wrong with Jay, Noh and Terrance. Very soft spoken, but shows something of a violent temper in the third volume, throwing Cassidy into a pillar after Jay, his relative, died. He is the only Hunter to be somewhat praised by Daemon following the attacks at the beginning of the third volume.

Noh (Nadezhda)
A hunter in-training apprenticed to Daemon. She is very strong and obviously not to be messed with. She has a mark down her lip and circular eyebrows. She currently has her time taken away from her after a confrontation with Alex Treveney. She was saved via the Reave in the fourth book. Noh's real name is Nadezhda, or Nadya for short. Marina calls her Nadya in volumes 2 and 3. Marina seems to be incredibly close to her.

Ten
A hunter in-training apprenticed to Daemon. She fights using two chains with handles on each end and is extremely strong for her stature and age. She has pink highlights in her hair, as shown in the cover of the third volume. She is usually really peppy.

Teresa
A hunter in-training apprenticed to Daemon. She fights using stakes and throwing daggers. She appears to be the strongest of the apprentices. Her nickname is Rese. She wants a Salamander tattoo on her left leg, but since hunters heal very quickly, she can't have one.

Terrance
A hunter in-training apprenticed to Daemon. He is apparently very strong, although he was quickly defeated by Alex Treveney without even a fight. He has one black streak under his left eye. He had his time taken away from him after confronting Alex Treveney. He was saved via the Reave.

=== Other ===
Marina Zaikina
Former seer of the Chase family, which is mainly a werewolf family. She tells Daemon about a vision of hers, saying, "A broken seal. Something ... something was in there. Not anymore. There is me, standing. And then another. And another. Seven. All children. We waited a long time. And now ... We walk away. And the sky turns wrong. There are bodies everywhere. We walk. And walk. And walk." Later she follows up this vision with; "...I am still walking, teacher. The others are still walking. But not her. She is already here." The "her" appears to be Alex Treveney. Much later in the book she has another vision, after Noh, J, and Terrance have been defeated by an unknown force. "It's her. S-She took...time from them. As a warning to us." She also has experiences like Alex's, including the appearance of a translucent cloak and no memories of what she has said. She is one of the Sohrem. The Sohrem seems to be making her more evil and violent.

Mona
A worker who appears to work at a sanctuary. She is powerful enough to revert people back to humans if they have just become a vampire.

Reau
Mr. Roi's butler. He has shown a disdain for Mr. Roi and is easily and frequently exasperated by him. He is not a 'fellow creature' according to Mr. Roi, and has a secret compartment in his chest.

== Beings ==
=== Weirn/Astral ===
The weirn is a specific type of witch characterized by strong magical abilities and a being or familiar called an astral. The astral seems to be the defining characteristic that separates Weirns from regular witches. Astrals appear as a floating mask with black and white smoke coming all around it. They are demons bound to the weirn for life. According to Mrs. Murrey, "Astrals are not terribly smart, unlike real demons like myself. They are as loyal as dogs and have just about as much sense or finesse, but with care, attention, and proper training techniques, they can become quite clever and useful, beyond their natural function of protecting you and being a general waste of space... Astrals may be easily capable of punching through walls and such, but applying finesse in a delicate task? You'll find out it's not quite as easy as it [looks]." However, Sarah (in one of Alex's memories) explains that an astral is not a "separate thing" from its weirn, but a "part of your being, part of your power - like your voice, your hands." They don't like being treated as inferior or separate from their weirns, and cannot fairly be blamed for their owners' faults in controlling them. A few notes: It is taboo for a person to touch a weirn's astral, and it appears that it is extremely insulting to ask to see or touch it. Weirns are able to hide their astrals from view simply by telling them to hide. With their astrals hidden, weirns appear to be normal humans. Astrals are fiercely protective of their weirns, and possess immense strength and shapeshifting abilities, though the last appears to come only with training and experience. Alex's astral is extremely fond of cookies.

=== Vampire ===
The vampire, sometimes called a "nozzie" by Hunters, is a being that drinks the blood of others to satisfy a desire for blood or 'the life' of another. Vampires transform over generations into something called a ripper. The ripper seems to have more in common with a ghast or ghouls in this stage of evolution and will attack anything without being able to control itself. According to the Hunters, all vampires eventually turn to rippers if they survive long enough. The vampires' inability to be photographed is the reason why the Nightschool has never had a yearbook. Sarah Treveney intended to remedy this by substituting drawn portraits for pictures.

=== Shifter ===
Shifters are night people who can transform into animals. The only ones we see are Gray and his cronies, but there are many different kinds. Not much is known, but they can heal extremely quickly.

=== Demons ===
Demons are humanoids who appear to possess magical abilities. The most obvious example is Mrs. Murrey, who draws Alex into a world she has created for the final exam. In this world, she appears as a bat-like creature. Demons can also cast spells: Mrs. Murrey performs several on misbehaving students. Demons have pointed ears, and completely red eyes with x-shaped or sideways pupils.

=== Seers ===
Have the ability to 'see' into the future. They need to take medicine to remain sane, as their visions may make them go crazy, but the medicine often affects visions. People will pay millions to hire a sane Seer.

=== Sohrem ===
Millennia ago word spread of seven children walking the land spreading death and destroying whole cities. Nothing was spared, and no stone left standing. Mr Roi and his companions named them Sohrem, meaning "hollow wrath", saying that "it seemed to fit." They rejected all attempts at negotiations and "simply crushed everything in its path as if it were a duty." Mr Roi tried to learn about them although not much could be learned from the dead bodies left behind, but he did learn that "one thing was for certain- they were all real children before they turned. Not happy children, I should add, all carrying burdens that no children that age should have to bear. Exceptionally strong spirits all seven - none of them buckling under the weight. One was a hunter of all things." Before Roi and his companions sealed them, the Sohrem promised him that it was not over.

Eron broke the seal on the advice of Mr Roi's defeated companions, believing they would make him a Night Lord. They also forced the Sohrem to be sealed within Alex and Ronee. It isn't known if they decided the other 5 hosts. The Sohrem's reason for destruction is "Justice. I have come for justice. I spoke with the voice of thousands. It is millions, now. This world would not hear them cry. This world would not help. It will now pay the price." It seems that the Sohrem's hosts were abused children.

From their speech, it seems the Sohrem consider themselves a force of justice. It seems that, in their mind, they are meting out a deserved punishment to the world for not helping those in need, which would fit with how the hosts were people who had harsh lives. Although they seemed to be content to let their original 7 hosts use the power of their own volitation, they can also take control of their host and use their power themselves, which they did upon realizing that their hosts had been chosen for them.

Mr Roi, Daemon, and Madam Chen stopped the Sohrem using a highly powerful time-altering spell known as the Reave to change several things in the past, such as saving Theo's son, bringing the stolen time back, and temporarily sealing the Sohrem individually. However, the seals will not last forever.

== Release ==
Written and illustrated by Svetlana Chmakova, the chapters of Nightschool have appeared as a serial in the monthly manga anthology Yen Plus since August 2008. The chapters are compiled into four bound volumes by Yen Press. In anticipation of Chmakova's new book, The Weirn Books: Be Wary of the Silent Woods, all four volumes of Nightschool were re-released in 2020 in the form of two collections.

=== Volume list ===
No.	North American release date	North American ISBN
01	April 2009	978-0-7595-2859-8
Chapters 1—6; Afterword
02	October 2009	978-0-7595-2860-4
Chapters 7-12; Afterword
03	April 2010	978-0-7595-2861-1
Chapters 13-18; Bonus Story; Afterword
04	October 2010	978-0-316-09126-8
Chapters 19-24; Afterword

== Reception ==
Critics positively reviewed the first chapter in Yen Plus as "very ambitious" and a promising start, though one questioned Chmakova's ability to "keep up with such an ambitious schedule." Similar positive reviews have followed for the bound volumes. Mangalife's Joy Kim praised the racially diverse group of characters, but thought the characters were "a bit underdeveloped" compared to the protagonist. She found the second volume to be an improvement since the first, which focused more on "world-building" than characters, and praised the art as "full of energy, personality, and humor." Ed Sizemore also noted the improvement of the second volume over the first and stated: "I fully recommend this book for the art alone, if not completely for the storytelling."

About.com's Debi Aoki listed Nightschool as the Best New Original English Manga of 2009. Young Adult Library Services Association, a division of the American Library Association, put the first two volumes of Nightschool on its 2010 list of Great Graphic Novels For Teens.

It was also one of the top manga properties for Yen Press in 2009.
