= Even Though We're Adults =

Japanese yuri manga

- First tankōbon volume cover

おとなになっても (Otona ni Nattemo)
- Genre: Drama; Yuri
- Manga
- Written by: Takako Shimura
- Published by: Kodansha
- English publisher: NA: Seven Seas Entertainment
- Magazine: Kiss
- Original run: March 25, 2019 – August 24, 2023
- Volumes: 10
- Television drama
- Original network: Hulu, Nippon TV
- Original run: April 26, 2025 – July 5, 2025
- Episodes: 12

Even Though We're Adults (Japanese: おとなになっても, Hepburn: Otona ni Nattemo) is a Japanese yuri manga written and illustrated by Takako Shimura. It was serialized in Kodansha's Kiss magazine from March 2019 to August 2023. A live-action television drama adaptation aired from April to July 2025.

== Plot ==
When Ayano – an elementary school teacher in her 30s – runs into a friendly woman, Akari, at her favorite bar, sparks begin to fly. As the night ends, Ayano goes in to kiss Akari. However, their newly-formed relationship becomes even more complicated when Akari finds out that Ayano has a husband.

== Media ==
=== Manga ===
Written and illustrated by Takako Shimura, Even Though We're Adults was serialized in Kodansha's Kiss magazine from March 25, 2019, to August 24, 2023. The series was collected in ten tankōbon volumes from October 2019 to November 2023.

The series is licensed for an English release in North America by Seven Seas Entertainment.

==== Volume list ====
No.	Original release date	Original ISBN	English release date	English ISBN
1	October 11, 2019	978-4-06-517588-0	February 9, 2021	978-1-64505-957-8
2	March 13, 2020	978-4-06-518948-1	June 15, 2021	978-1-64827-228-8
3	August 12, 2020	978-4-06-520543-3	October 19, 2021	978-1-64827-344-5
4	January 13, 2021	978-4-06-522056-6	April 5, 2022	978-1-63858-131-4
5	September 13, 2021	978-4-06-524896-6	November 22, 2022	978-1-63858-319-6
6	February 10, 2022	978-4-06-526509-3	June 13, 2023	978-1-68579-669-3
7	August 12, 2022	978-4-06-528527-5	December 26, 2023	979-8-88843-089-7
8	January 13, 2023	978-4-06-530114-2	June 11, 2024	979-8-88843-642-4
9	June 13, 2023	978-4-06-531835-5	October 29, 2024	979-8-89160-178-9
10	November 13, 2023	978-4-06-533227-6	February 11, 2025	979-8-89160-873-3

=== Drama ===
A live-action television drama adaptation starring Mizuki Yamamoto and Chiaki Kuriyama was announced on February 18, 2025. It aired on Hulu from April 26 to July 5 of the same year.

== Reception ==
Erica Friedman of Yuricon in her review of Volume 1 noted her ambivalent relationships towards Shimura's work due to the "varying degrees of verisimilitude" that Shimura has toward gender and sexual minorities within their work, further criticizing that "this story feels equal parts solid and kind of icky. It may also be that I'm not particularly thrilled to have either another "messy relationship with a married woman story" or a story that makes the lesbian performatively self-loathy. At the same time, there are elements here that keep bringing me back to this story" In her volume 6 review, she went on to praise the series as a whole: "I'm still of the belief that this is Shimura-sensei's best work to date and I just hope she has a clear ending in mind – whether it's the ending I want, or not."

Anna Williams, writing from Comic Book Resources, noted that Shimura handled the topics of marriage, cheating, and discovering one's sexuality in adulthood, with "expertise and grace", remarking that the series "is an absolute must-read series for anyone searching for a yuri manga that chooses to take a much more somber, bittersweet look at love."
