= Musume no Iede =

Japanese manga series

- First tankōbon volume cover

娘の家出
- Genre: Drama
- Manga
- Written by: Takako Shimura
- Published by: Shueisha
- Magazine: Jump X (2012, 2014); Miracle Jump (2014–2017)
- Original run: October 10, 2012 – February 28, 2017
- Volumes: 6
- icon

Musume no Iede (娘の家出; lit. 'The Daughter's Runaway') is a Japanese manga series written and illustrated by Takako Shimura. First published as a one-shot in Shueisha's manga magazine Girls Jump in January 2012, Musume no Iede was published as a mini series in Shueisha's Jump X from October to December 2012, and later serialized in the same magazine from March to October 2014, until the magazine ceased its publication, and the series continued in Miracle Jump from December 2014 to February 2017; its chapters were collected in six tankōbon volumes.

== Plot ==
Following her parents' divorce, Mayuko Ochiai (落合 まゆこ, Ochiai Mayuko) runs away from home after her mother remarries and seeks refuge at her father's residence. Her father is homosexual and lives with his younger partner. Mayuko later finds herself part of "Team Divorce" (チーム離婚, Chiimu Rikon), a group of four adolescent girls who have all fled troubled home lives shaped by divorce, remarriage, and family estrangement. The group includes Kanako Osawa (大沢 可夏子, Osawa Kanako), entangled in an affair with a family acquaintance; Nina Aihara (相原 仁菜, Aihara Nina), adrift after her siblings' divorces; and Ayaka Yamaguchi (山口 綾香, Yamaguchi Ayaka), whose father left when she was young. The series depicts their escapes, conflicts, and search for belonging amid fractured families and the tumult of youth.

== Publication ==
Written and illustrated by Takako Shimura, Musume no Iede was first published as a one-shot in Shueisha's manga magazine Girls Jump on January 27, 2012. It was later published as a miniseries in Shueisha's seinen manga magazine Jump X from October 10 to December 10, 2012, and later serialized in the same magazine from March 10 to October 10, 2014, when the magazine ceased its publication. It later continued in Miracle Jump from December 16, 2014, to February 28, 2017. Shueisha collected its chapters in six tankōbon volumes, released from May 9, 2014, to April 19, 2017.

=== Volumes ===
No.	Japanese release date	Japanese ISBN
1	May 9, 2014	978-4-08-879829-5
2	February 19, 2015	978-4-08-890047-6
3	August 19, 2015	978-4-08-890244-9
4	March 18, 2016	978-4-08-890356-9
5	September 16, 2016	978-4-08-890490-0
6	April 19, 2017	978-4-08-890668-3
