= Awkward (graphic novel) =

2015 graphic novel by Svetlana Chmakova

- Cover of Awkward
- Author: Svetlana Chmakova
- Genre: Graphic novel; realistic fiction
- Publisher: Yen Press
- Publication date: July 2015
- Media type: Print (Hardcover and paperback)
- Pages: 224
- Awards: 2016 Dwayne McDuffie Award for Kids' Comics; Joe Shuster Comics for Kids Award
- ISBN: 978-0-316-38130-7
- Followed by: Brave

Awkward is a 2015 children's graphic novel written by Svetlana Chmakova. The book tells the story of Penelope "Peppi" Torres, a new student at Berrybrook Middle School, whose first encounter with a boy from the science club leads to much awkwardness between them, and their sparring clubs.

== Themes ==
Awkward's main theme is that of friendship, directly addressing the mocking boys and girls get for being friends, and the hardships of navigating friend group drama. It also touches on growing up, and not putting yourself in a box.

The fourth book in the series, Diary, features additional stories with the characters from Awkward.

== Reception and awards ==
Awkward has received largely positive reviews by book critics. Amanda M. Vail of The Mary Sue said "it needs to be on the shelves of every school and public library." Awkward was named as one of the School Library Journal's Top 10 Graphic Novels of 2015. It was also named by YALSA on their list of the 2016 Great Graphic Novels for Teens.

Awkward won the 2nd Annual Dwayne McDuffie Award for Kids' Comics, Dragon Award for Kids Comics at the 2016 Shuster Awards, and was nominated for the Eisner Award for Best Publication for Teens.

== Publication information ==
- Author: Svetlana Chmakova
- Originally published: July 15, 2015
- Publisher: Yen Press, an imprint of Hachette Book Group
- Lettering: JuYoun Lee
- Coloring Assistants: Ru Xu, Melissa McCommon
