= Todd Mitchell (author) =

American author

- Born: January 8, 1974 (age 52)
- Education: Illinois Mathematics and Science Academy
- Alma mater: Oberlin College
- Occupations: Novelist, short story writer
- Writing career
- Language: English
- Period: 2007–present
- Genre: Children's literature
- Notable work: The Last Panther

Todd Mitchell (born January 8, 1974) is an American author of young adult, middle grade fiction and graphic novels. Mitchell is also an assistant professor and director of creative writing pedagogy at Colorado State University.

== Career ==
Mitchell works as an assistant professor of creative writing pedagogy at Colorado State University, where he also serves as the director of the Beginning Creative Writing Teaching Program. He published his first novel, The Traitor King, in 2007 through Scholastic; Mitchell would later re-release the novel in 2012 via self-publishing. Mitchell published The Last Panther through Yearling in 2017. The novel is set in an apocalyptic Florida and deals with environmental issues including climate change.

In 2011 Mitchell published the story "The Guardian" in the graphic novel anthology A Flight of Angels and in 2017, began independently publishing the graphic series Broken Saviors.

In 2019 film and television rights for his then as of yet unpublished book The Naming Girl were optioned by Good Neighbors Media, with Jennifer Phang named as director.

== Bibliography ==
=== Novels ===
- The Traitor King (2007, Scholastic, 2012, Todd Mitchell Books)
- The Secret to Lying (2010, Candlewick Press)
- Backwards (2013, Candlewick Press)
- The Last Panther (2017, Yearling)
- The Naming Girl (2021, Owl Hollow Press)

=== Comics ===
- "The Guardian" in A Flight of Angels (2011, Vertigo/DC Comics)
- Broken Saviors (2017 - current, Radiant Squirrels Productions)

== Awards ==
- Best YA Book from the Colorado Authors' League for Backwards (2014)
- Colorado Book Award in Juvenile Literature for The Last Panther (2018)
