= Muhammad Najem =

Syrian war reporter (born 2002)

Muhammad Alacbam
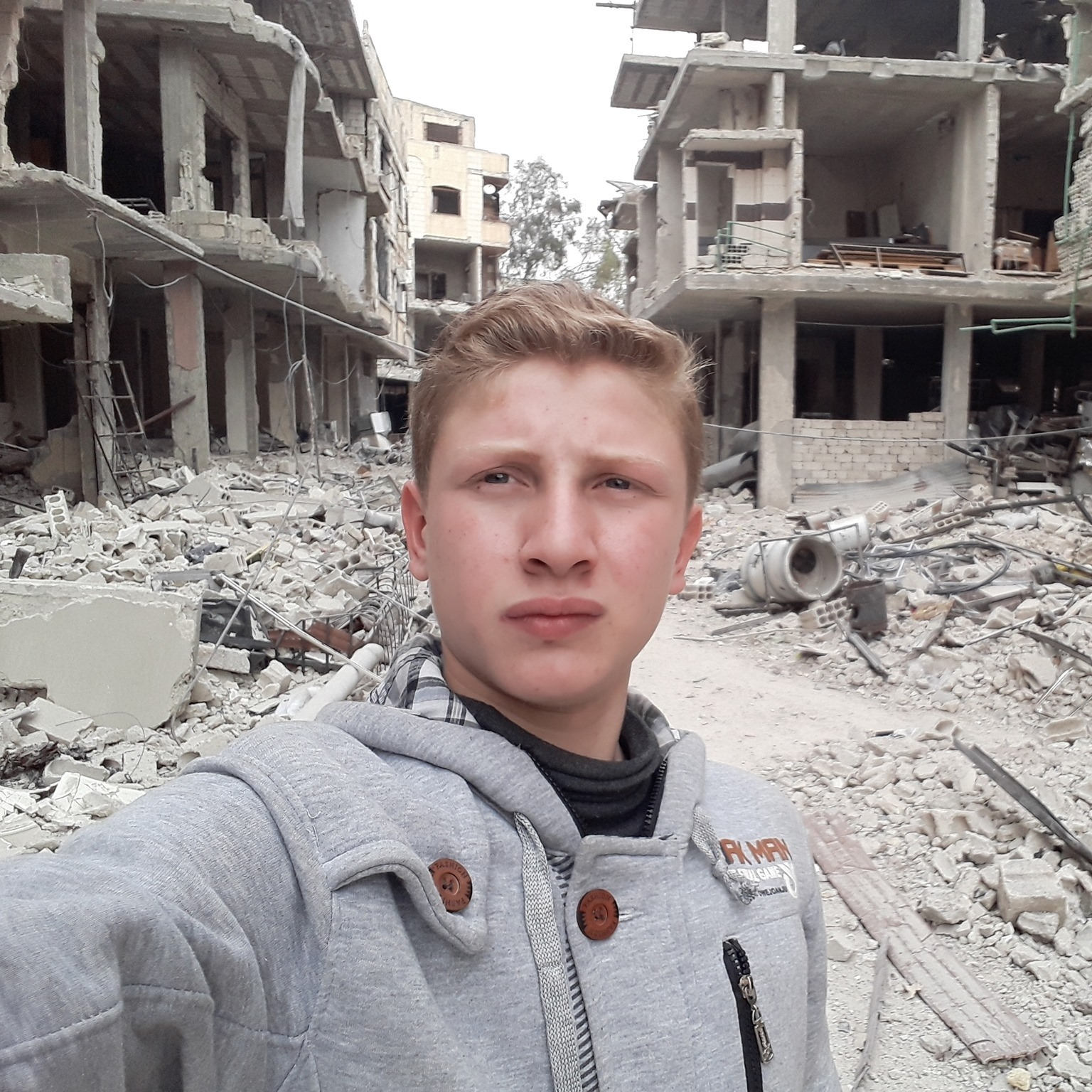
- Born: September 9, 2002 (age 23); Eastern Ghouta in Syria

Muhammad Najem (born 2002) is a Syrian war reporter and activist who has been documenting the Syrian civil war since the age of 15. In December 2017, his home of Ghouta, a suburb of Damascus, was besieged by the Syrian Army, and Najem told his family he wanted to tell their story. They decided to release English-language videos on YouTube featuring Najem, assisted by his older brother Firas, a photojournalist, and their sister Hiba, a teacher, who helped translate. His videos attained a wide audience in February 2018, when CNN producer Nora Neus picked up his story. Shortly after, RT ran a story accusing him of being a "crisis actor".

In March 2019, Najem's family was forcibly evacuated to Idlib, and later became refugees in Istanbul Turkey. He continues to report on the Syrian conflict including conflicts in other Middle Eastern countries such as Palestine.

He was featured in Know Your Rights and Claim Them, by Angelina Jolie. With Nora Neus and Julie Robine, he created a graphical autobiography entitled Muhammad Najem, War Reporter.

== See also ==
- Battle of Harasta (2017–2018)
