= Svetlana Chmakova =

Russian-Canadian comic artist

Svetlana Chmakova Светлана Шмакова
- Born: October 7, 1979 (age 47) Russian SFSR, Soviet Union
- Areas: Writer, Penciller, Artist, Inker
- Notable works: Dramacon, Nightschool, and Awkward
- Awards: Joe Shuster Comics for Kids Award, Dwayne McDuffie Award for Kids' Comics

Svetlana Chmakova (Russian: Светлана Шмакова) (b. October 7, 1979) is a Russian-Canadian comic book artist. She is best known for Dramacon, an original English-language (OEL) manga spanning three volumes and published in North America by Tokyopop. Her other original work includes Nightschool and Awkward for Yen Press. She has been nominated for an Eisner Award twice. Previously, she created The Adventures of CG for CosmoGIRL! magazine and the webcomic Chasing Rainbows for Girlamatic.

== Early life and education ==
Chmakova was born in Russia where she was first exposed to comics after she found Elfquest at a Moscow book stand. After she emigrated to Canada at the age of 16, she graduated from the Sheridan College Classical Animation program in 2002. She then began to publish her manga on the Internet. According to her website, she is married and has a toddler. Her husband manages her website.

== Career ==
Dramacon is Chmakova's first full-length comic, telling the story of Christie Leroux, an aspiring teenage comics writer, and her experiences at her first anime convention. She attends the convention with her artist boyfriend Derek Hollman, but soon finds herself attracted to a mysterious, sun-glassed cosplayer named Matt Green.

Other works by Chmakova include The Adventures of CG for CosmoGIRL! magazine and the Chasing Rainbows and Night Silver webcomics. Her art also appears in Mangaka America and Flight.

On February 24, 2007, at New York Comic Con, Yen Press announced that they would be publishing Nightschool, a new original manga by Chmakova.

At New York Comic Con on October 10, 2014, Yen Press announced that they would be publishing Awkward, a new original comic by Chmakova. Brave, a sequel to Awkward, was announced on April 25, 2016. Crush, the third book in the series, was released in 2017, and received the 2019 Excellence in Graphic Literature Award in the Middle Grade Category. On September 22, 2022, the next book in the series, Enemies, was released in the US and Canada.

=== Critical reaction ===
The Atlanta Journal-Constitution described Dramacon as "surprisingly true-to-life (and occasionally harrowing) emotional drama and humor ... Creator Svetlana Chmakova doesn't skimp on character development or plot progression. Her art is top-notch as well, outstripping even many of her Japanese inspirations with clear storytelling and polished technique."

Dramacon was nominated for an Eisner Award in 2007.

Nightschool won the Dragon Award for Kids Comics at the Shuster Awards in 2010.

Awkward was named as one of School Library Journal's Top 10 Graphic Novels of 2015. It was also named by YALSA on their list of the 2016 Great Graphic Novels for Teens. Amanda M. Vail of The Mary Sue said "it needs to be on the shelves of every school and public library."

Awkward won the 2nd Annual Dwayne McDuffie Award for Kids' Comics, Dragon Award for Kids Comics at the 2016 Shuster Awards, and was nominated for an Eisner Award.

Brave has received largely positive reviews by book critics. Good Comics for Kids, a blog hosted by School Library Journal called it "a surefire hit" with magnificent artwork. Brave was later named as one of the School Library Journal's Top 10 Graphic Novels of 2017. It was also nominated to the YALSA list of the Great Graphic Novels for Teens, included on Amazon.com's list of Best Comics and Graphic Novels of 2017, and ICv2's Top 10 Kids Graphic Novels of 2017. Brigid Alverson named it one of her top 10 graphic novels for kids in 2017.

The Weirn Books: Be Wary of the Silent Woods was nominated for the 2021 Joe Shuster Awards.

== Bibliography ==
Year	Title	Publisher	ISBN	Notes
2000	Yoriko, Maiden of the First Fire	Kat And Neko Manga		
2003–2006	Chasing Rainbows	Girlamatic		
2003	Night Silver	Wirepop		
2005–2007	The Adventures of CG	CosmoGIRL!		
2005	Dramacon volume 1	Tokyopop	978-1-59816-129-8	
2006	Dramacon volume 2	Tokyopop	978-1-59816-130-4	
2007	Dramacon volume 3	Tokyopop	978-1-59816-131-1	
2008	Dramacon: Ultimate Edition	Tokyopop	978-1-42781-340-4	Contains volumes 1-3 and an additional short story
2008	"On The Importance Of Space Travel"	Ballantine Books	978-0-345-50589-7	Appears as a short story in volume 5 of Flight
2009	Nightschool: The Weirn Books volume 1	Yen Press	978-0-7595-2859-8	Originally appeared in Yen Plus
2009	Nightschool: The Weirn Books volume 2	Yen Press	978-0-7595-2860-4	Originally appeared in Yen Plus
2010	"Red Maple Leaves"	Penguin Books	978-0-6700-6849-4	Appears as an illustrated chapter in Piece by Piece by Teresa Toten
2010	Nightschool: The Weirn Books volume 3	Yen Press	978-0-7595-2861-1	Originally appeared in Yen Plus
2010	Nightschool: The Weirn Books volume 4	Yen Press	978-0-316-09126-8	Originally appeared in Yen Plus
2011	Witch and Wizard	Yen Press	978-0-316-11989-4	Manga adaptation of the novel by James Patterson
2012	Witch and Wizard: The Gift	Yen Press	978-0-316-11991-7	Manga adaptation of the novel by James Patterson
2013	Witch and Wizard: The Fire	Yen Press	978-0-316-11984-9	Manga adaptation of the novel by James Patterson
2015	Awkward	Yen Press	978-0-316-38130-7 (paperback) 978-0-316-38132-1 (hardcover)	Volume 1 of the Berrybrook Middle School series
2016	The Art Adventures of Mr. Raccoon	self-published		Coloring book
2017	Brave	JY	978-0-316-36318-1 (paperback) 978-0-316-36317-4 (hardcover)	Volume 2 of the Berrybrook Middle School series
2018	Crush	JY	978-0-316-36324-2 (paperback) 978-0-316-36323-5 (hardcover)	Volume 3 of the Berrybrook Middle School series
2019	Diary	JY	978-1-975-33279-2 (paperback)	Volume 4 of the Berrybrook Middle School series
2019	Berrybrook Middle School Box Set	JY	978-1-975-33280-8	Includes Awkward, Brave, Crush, and Diary from the Berrybrook Middle School series
2020	Nightschool: The Weirn Books Collector's Edition volume 1	Yen Press	978-1-975-31289-3	Includes volumes 1 & 2 of Nightschool: The Weirn Books
2020	Nightschool: The Weirn Books Collector's Edition volume 2	Yen Press	978-1-975-31290-9	Includes volumes 3 & 4 of Nightschool: The Weirn Books
2020	The Weirn Books volume 1 Be Wary of the Silent Woods	JY	978-1-975-31122-3 (paperback) 978-1-975-31121-6 (hardcover)	
2022	Enemies	JY	978-1-975-31272-5 (paperback) 978-1-975-31279-4 (hardcover)	Volume 5 of the Berrybrook Middle School series
2024	The Weirn Books volume 2 The Ghost and the Stolen Dragon	JY	978-1-975-31127-8 (paperback) 978-1-975-31126-1 (hardcover)	
2026	Fight	JY	979-8-855-44085-0 (paperback) 979-8-855-44086-7 (hardcover)	Volume 6 of the Berrybrook Middle School series
