= Hisae Iwaoka =

Japanese manga artist

Hisae Iwaoka (Japanese: 岩岡 ヒサエ, born 17 July 1976, Chiba Prefecture) is a Japanese manga artist.

== Career ==
Iwaoka started her career as a professional manga artist in the early 2000s, when she released several short stories to critical acclaim. In 2002, she won the newcomers award Afternoon Shiki Shō of the manga magazine Monthly Afternoon for "Yume no Soko". The short story was published in the October 2002 issue of Monthly Afternoon and became her debut. In 2004, she won the alternative manga magazine Monthly Ikki's newcomer award Ikiman for "Shiroi Kumo". Two of her short story collections were jury-recommended works at the Japan Media Arts Festival; Shiroi Kumo in 2005 and Yume no Soko in 2006.

Some of her work was included in the 2004 Takashi Murakami exhibition "Tokyo Girls Bravo" at the Marianne Boesky Gallery, where her artwork was compared to that of A. A. Milne.

Eventually, from 2004 on she focused on series, publishing in magazines for different demographics such as seinen, shōjo and josei. Hoshigahara Aomanjū no Mori was a jury-recommended work at the 2010 Japan Media Arts Festival. And the science fiction series Saturn Apartments, published in Monthly Ikki and licensed in English by Viz Media, won the festival's Grand Prize in 2011, making her the third female artist after Makoto Isshiki and Fumiyo Kōno to win the award. The jury called the manga a "gentle human drama set in the near-future earth". Her ongoing series Koshoku Robot has been made into live-action series.

Aside from her publications as a professional manga artist, she is also active in amateur manga. In 2009, she formed a doujinshi circle named "Harapeko Sentai Hashi Ranger" together with fellow manga artists Takako Shimura, Fumiko Tanagawa, Aoki Toshinao and Ishide Den.

== Works ==
Title	Year	Notes	Refs
Shiroi Kumo (しろいくも; lit. 'White Clouds')	2004	Short story collection published by Shogakukan in 1 vol.	
Hana Bōro (花ボーロ; lit. 'Flower Cookies')	2004–2005	Serialized in Monthly Ikki; Published by Shogakukan in 1 vol.	
Yume no Soko (ゆめの底)	2005	Short story collection published by Kodansha in 1 vol.	
Saturn Apartments (土星マンション, Dosei Manshon)	2005–2011	Serialized in Monthly Ikki; Published by Shogakukan in 7 vol. Published in English by Viz Media	
Oto no Hako (オトノハコ)	2008	Serialized in Beth; Published by Kodansha in 1 vol.	
Hoshigahara Aomanjū no Mori (星が原あおまんじゅうの森)	2008–2014	Serialized in Nemuki; Published by Asahi Sonorama in 5 vol.	
Shiawase no Machi (幸せのマチ)	2009–2016	Serialized in Nemuki+ Published by Asahi Shimbunsha in 1 vol.	
Narihirabashi Denki Shōten (なりひらばし電器商店)	2012–2013	Serialized in Evening; Published by Kodansha in 2 vol.	
Koshoku Robot (孤食ロボット, Koshoku Robotto)	2013–present	Serialized in Jump X (2013–2014) and Cookie (2014–Present); Published by Shueisha in 8 vol. (as of January 2023)	
Kichijitsu Goyomi (きちじつごよみ)	2017–present	Serialized in Feel Young; Published by Shodensha in 1 vol. (as of January 2023)	
