= Brave (graphic novel) =

2017 graphic novel by Svetlana Chmakova

- Cover of Brave
- Author: Svetlana Chmakova
- Genre: Graphic novel; fiction
- Publisher: Yen Press
- Publication date: May 2017
- Media type: Print (Hardcover; paperback)
- Pages: 248
- ISBN: 978-0-316-36318-1
- Preceded by: Awkward
- Followed by: Crush
- Website: svetlania.com/comics.shtml

Brave is a children's graphic novel written by Svetlana Chmakova. The book is set in the same Berrybrook Middle School as in her preceding Awkward, but follows a different character, Jensen, who had a minor role in Awkward. The next novel in the Berrybrook series, Crush, will follow the character Jorge, who was introduced in Brave as Jensen's project partner. Olivia which is Jorge’s best friend is also introduced in the story. The fourth book in the series, Diary features a short story featuring Jensen and his friends.

== Plot summary ==
Jensen Graham is a member of the art club who is bullied and ignored by his school mates on a daily basis, although he does not consider it bullying. He joins the newspaper club after becoming frustrated in the art club when he learns that some well-known authors (who all his friends know about but he doesn’t) will be visiting Berry Brook Middle School. He reads the bullying handouts he received from the newspaper club and begins to wonder if he is being bullied.

== Reception and awards ==
Brave has received largely positive reviews by book critics. Good Comics for Kids, a blog hosted by School Library Journal called it "a surefire hit" with magnificent artwork. Brave was later named as one of the School Library Journal's Top 10 Graphic Novels of 2017. It was also nominated to the YALSA list of the Great Graphic Novels for Teens, included on Amazon.com's list of Best Comics and Graphic Novels of 2017, and ICv2's Top 10 Kids Graphic Novels of 2017. Brigid Alverson named it one of her top 10 graphic novels for kids in 2017.

== Publication information ==
- Author: Svetlana Chmakova
- Originally published: May 23, 2017
- Publisher: Yen Press, an imprint of Hachette Book Group
