= Saturn Apartments =

Japanese manga series

- First tankōbon volume cover, featuring Mitsu

土星マンション (Dosei Manshon)
- Genre: Science fiction
- Manga
- Written by: Hisae Iwaoka
- Published by: Shogakukan
- English publisher: NA: Viz Media
- Imprint: Ikki Comix
- Magazine: Monthly Ikki
- Original run: November 25, 2005 – June 25, 2011
- Volumes: 7
- icon

Saturn Apartments (Japanese: 土星マンション, Hepburn: Dosei Manshon) is a Japanese manga series written and illustrated by Hisae Iwaoka. It was serialized in Shogakukan's seinen manga magazine Monthly Ikki from November 2005 to June 2011, with its chapters collected in seven tankōbon volumes. Viz Media licensed the series for English-language publication in North America.

== Plot ==
The story is set in a distant future, where the Earth has been evacuated and humanity now inhabits a man-made ring-shaped city orbiting 35 kilometers above the planet's surface. The ring is divided into floors, of which there are three; the first being the living space of everyday workers, the second being dedicated to agriculture, and the third being the dwellings of the upper class. The plot follows the life of a young man called Mitsu, whose job as a window cleaner allows him a glimpse into the lives of the ring's inhabitants, as he attempts to learn more about his father's disappearance while working in the same job.

== Characters ==
=== Window Cleaners ===
Mitsu
Mitsu works as a window cleaner because he takes joy in it and because he wants to learn about his father's ill disappearance at work. He tends to be of a very calm nature, and he is very dedicated to his job, something he is aware of as being a dangerous and low-paying occupation. He is somewhat inexperienced and insecure of himself.
Aki
Mitsu's late father, who raised the latter by himself until his untimely death during a job when the rope dangling him snapped. Since Mitsu was very young at the time, much of Aki is told from his friends and colleagues, upon many of which he had a profound influence on.
Jin
Jin is Mitsu's superior and occasional supervisor who has had plenty more experience working as a window cleaner. He tends to speak gruffly and is externally of a brash nature, however he is caring for his co-workers. He lives with his wife, Haruko, and is a close friend of Tamachi (even though they dislike admitting it).
Makoto
A co-worker of Mitsu who has a grudge with him for "replacing Tamachi" and for "having it so easy" in terms of work.

=== Other characters ===
Haruko
Jin's wife. Haruko is frail and prone to blackouts due to what is described as an autoimmunity deficiency caused by a lack of sunlight in the lower levels. In a flashback it is revealed that she dislikes hospitals due to an accident that led to her sterility. This doesn't stop Haruko from being cheery and from participating in public agriculture.
The Kageyamas
A family of three that occasionally house Mitsu. The family is integrated by the bald and boisterous Mr. Kageyama (who is also a window cleaner), his wife, and their daughter Fuyo.
Tamachi
Tamachi once worked as a window cleaner and was the former partner of Aki (Mitsu's father) until the latter's death, whom he blames himself for. He now works in a bio-gas plant with his friend Sohta.
Sohta
Sohta is an aspiring scientist who lives with his wife in the lower levels, and works with his friend, Tamachi, at the gas plant. It was his honeymoon request for a lower-level window to be washed where Mitsu's father, Aki, died.
Sachi
An acquaintance of Mitsu who works as a "falling objects researcher" . She was originally mistaken as a man by Mitsu. She and her pet cat live outside of the ring on a small cabin, and the exposure to solar radiation gives her constant sunburns.

== Publication ==
Saturn Apartments, written and illustrated by Hisae Iwaoka, was serialized in Shogakukan's seinen manga magazine Monthly Ikki from November 25, 2005, to June 25, 2011. Shogakukan collected its chapters in seven tankōbon volumes, released from October 30, 2006, to August 30, 2011.

The manga was licensed in North America by Viz Media, who released its seven volumes from May 25, 2010, to May 21, 2013. It was also licensed in Taiwan by Taiwan Tohan, and Kana in France.

=== Volumes ===
Chapters are called "floors".

No.	Original release date	Original ISBN	English release date	English ISBN
1	October 30, 2006	978-4-09-188339-1	May 25, 2010	978-1-4215-3364-3
1. "Earth" (地球, Chikyū); 2. "Work" (仕事, Shigoto); 3. "Lights" (灯り, Akari); 4. "A Place Far Away" (遠い場所, Tōi Basho); 5. "An Ocean" (ウミ, Umi); 6. "The Green Room" (緑の部屋, Midori no Heya); 7. "Beneath The Mask" (仮面の下, Kamen no Shita); 8. "Artifice" (造り物, Tsukirimono)
2	June 29, 2007	978-4-09-188366-7	November 16, 2010	978-1-4215-3373-5
9. "A Small Room" (小さな部屋, Chiisana Heya); 10. "So Close And Yet So Far" (近くて遠く, Chikakute Tōku); 11. "Holiday" (ヤスミノヒ, Yasuminohi); 12. "Dinner" (食事会, Shokujikai); 13. "Night Festival" (夜祭, Yomatsuri); 14. "Where I Am Now" (今いる場所, Ima Iru Basho); 15. "Out Of Reach" (手の先に, Te no Saki ni); 16. "Glitter" (キラリ, Kirari); 17. "A Room Full Of Flowers" (華の部屋, Hana no Heya)
3	March 28, 2008	978-4-09-188408-4	May 17, 2011	978-1-4215-3374-2
18. "Alone In Her Room" (ヒトリの部屋, Hitori no Heya); 19. "Symbols" (記号, Kigō); 20. "An Empty Room" (空の部屋, Kara no Heya); 21. "The Everyday View" (いつもの風景, Itsumo no Fūkei); 22. "A Room With A Roof" (屋根のある部屋, Yane no Aru Heya); 23. "Cleaner" (掃除屋, Sōjiya); 24. "Use" (使いみち, Tsukaimichi); 25. "The Long Way Around" (遠回り, Tōmawari); 26. "A Voice That Travels" (届く声, Todoku Koe)
4	January 30, 2009	978-4-09-188436-7	November 15, 2011	978-1-4215-3375-9
27. "The Test" (試験, Shiken); 28. "His Role Model" (目標の人, Mokuhyō no Hito); 29. "His Own Road" (続くみち, Tsuzuku Michi); 30. "Sanctuary" (聖地, Seichi); 31. "Yukishima" (幸嶋, Yukishima); 32. "His Last Day" (仕事納め, Shigoto-osame); 33. "Saku" (さく, Saku); 34. "Stars Aligned" (星の並び, Hoshi no Narabi); 35. "Thoughts" (想い, Omoi)
5	November 30, 2009	978-4-09-188488-6	May 15, 2012	978-1-4215-4129-7
36. "The Egg Woman" (たまごの人, Tamago no Hito); 37. "A Wide Window" (広い窓, Hiroi Mado); 38. "Under The Window" (窓の下, Mado no Shita); 39. "What He Realized" (手にしたモノ, Te ni Shita Mono); 40. "A T-Shirt And A Resolution" (シャツと決意, Shatsu to Ketsui); 41. "The Swallowed-Up Voice" (包まれる声, Tsutsumareru Koe); 42. "Yukishima And Fried Chicken" (幸嶋と唐揚げ, Yukishima to Karāge); 43. "The Beginning Room" (始まりの部屋, Hajimari no Heya); 44. "The Druggist's Diagnosis" (薬屋の見立て, Kusuriya no Mitate)
6	August 30, 2010	978-4-09-188525-8	November 20, 2012	978-1-4215-4130-3
45. "The Guiding Thread" (導く糸は, Michibiku Ito wa); 46. "The Ship You Will Ride" (君の乗る舟, Kimi no Noru Fune); 47. "The Flat Ground" (平たい地, Hiratai-chi); 48. "Hope" (希望, Kibō); 49. "Looking At The Shadows" (影を見て, Kage o Mite); 50. "Confused One" (戸惑う者, Tomadō Mono); 51. "Smoke" (煙, Kemuri); 52. "Confusion" (混乱, Konran); 53. "Light And Shadow" (光と影, Hikari to Kage)
7	August 30, 2011	978-4-09-188556-2	May 21, 2013	978-1-4215-5268-2
54. "Quiet Procession" (静かな行進, Shizukana Kōshin); 55. "Crossroads" (交差点, Kōsaten); 56. "The Place Of Memories" (思い出す場所, Omoidasu Basho); 57. "Promise" (約束, Yakusoku); 58. "Change" (変化, Henka); 59. "The Same Place" (同じ場所, Onaji Basho); 60. "Unveiling The Ship" (舟のお披露目, Fune no Ohirome); 61. "Each Of Their Thoughts" (それぞれの想い, Sorezore no Omoi); 62. "End Of The Connected Paths" (繋がる道の先, Tsunagaru Michi no Saki); 63. "To The Surface" (地上へ, Chijō e); 64. "Homeland In The Sky" (空の故郷, Sora no Kokyō)

== Reception ==
Matthew Warner enjoyed the interesting world presented in the manga, and praised the 'simple, yet gorgeous art style'. Johanna Draper Carlson compares the protagonist, Mitsu, to Charlie Brown, as they both have rounded heads and small eyes, and are "dealing with a grim life". Later, she describes Mitsu as being a typical 'plucky young manga hero' who improves at his work, but is also noted for his talking to his upper-class clients. Greg McElhatton compares Iwaoka's artwork to Travis Charest and Sean Chen, praising the details of the work. YALSA included the first volume of the series on their 2011 Great Graphic Novels for Teens list.
