= Wandering Son =

Manga and anime series

- First volume cover, featuring Yoshino (left) and Shuichi

放浪息子 (Hōrō Musuko)
- Genre: Drama, slice of life
- Manga
- Written by: Takako Shimura
- Published by: Enterbrain
- English publisher: NA: Fantagraphics Books
- Magazine: Comic Beam
- Original run: December 2002 – August 2013
- Volumes: 15
- Anime television series
- Directed by: Ei Aoki
- Produced by: Jiyū Ōgi; Makoto Kimura; Shunsuke Saitō
- Written by: Mari Okada
- Music by: Keiichi Okabe; Satoru Kōsaki
- Studio: AIC Classic
- Original network: Fuji TV (Noitamina)
- Original run: January 13, 2011 – March 31, 2011
- Episodes: 12 (aired as 11)
- icon

Wandering Son (Japanese: 放浪息子, Hepburn: Hōrō Musuko) is a Japanese manga series written and illustrated by Takako Shimura. It was originally serialized in Comic Beam from the December 2002 to August 2013 issue, and published in 15 tankōbon volumes by Enterbrain from July 2003 to August 2013. The series is licensed in English by Fantagraphics Books, which released the first volume in North America in July 2011. A 12-episode anime adaptation produced by AIC Classic and directed by Ei Aoki aired in Japan between January and March 2011. Eleven episodes aired on television, with episodes 10 and 11 edited into a single episode, and were released individually on their respective BD/DVD volumes.

The story depicts a young trans girl named Shuichi Nitori, a student who develops a close relationship with another transgender classmate, a young boy named Yoshino Takatsuki. The series deals with issues such as coming to terms with being transgender, finding one's gender identity, the onset of puberty and gender dysphoria, and the social pressures associated with being transgender. Shimura was originally going to write the story about a girl in high school who wants to be a boy, but she realized that a boy who wants to be a girl before entering into puberty would have many worries related to growing up, and changed the story to fit this model. Wandering Son was selected as a recommended work by the awards jury of the tenth Japan Media Arts Festival in 2006. The series has been lauded for its exploration of gender identity and its depiction of transgender characters at the core of the story, though the emotional realism of the young characters has been called into question.

== Plot ==
At the start of Wandering Son, Shuichi Nitori is a student in the fifth grade who transfers into a new school. He quickly becomes friends with another student: the tall, boyish Yoshino Takatsuki. Yoshino soon learns of Shuichi's desire to be a girl. In a show of friendship, she confesses a similar desire to be a boy. Shuichi also becomes friends with Saori Chiba and Kanako Sasa, two other girls in the class. Saori instantly takes a liking to Shuichi and continuously encourages her to wear feminine clothes.

After Shuichi, Yoshino, and their friends enter sixth grade, Shuichi meets Makoto Ariga, another student their age from another class who also wants to be a girl. Shuichi and Yoshino become friends with an adult named Yuki, who is a trans woman living with a man named Shiina. Shuichi's older sister Maho becomes a model and eventually becomes friends with Maiko, a teen model whom she idolizes, and two other teen models: Tamaki Satō and Anna Suehiro. Maho gets a boyfriend, Riku Seya, and Shuichi confesses a crush on Yoshino, but Yoshino cannot reciprocate Shuichi's feelings. After Saori learns of this, she confesses she likes Shuichi, but Shuichi too cannot return her feelings. This results in a falling-out between Shuichi's friends as they prepare to enter junior high school.

In junior high school, they meet a tall, eccentric girl who befriends everyone, Chizuru Sarashina, and her prickly friend Momoko Shirai, who does not get along well with the others—especially Saori. Eventually, Saori and Yoshino rejoin Shuichi's group of friends, though Saori says she still hates Yoshino and Momoko. Shuichi and Anna start dating, much to the surprise of their friends and Shuichi's sister. Yoshino and Saori manage to halfway repair their friendship, though Saori is still standoffish to others. Shuichi's friends are split up into several classes upon entering their second year in junior high school. Shuichi becomes friends with Shinpei Doi, who previously teased her about wanting to be a girl. Yoshino attends school in a boy's uniform for a short time, and Shuichi tries to go to school dressed as a girl one day, but is laughed at, and they both become discouraged. Shuichi's friends worry as she begins skipping school. Although Shuichi eventually starts attending school regularly again, Anna breaks off their relationship. By the time Shuichi, Yoshino, and their friends enter their third year in junior high school, Shuichi's voice is changing which causes her dysphoria to worsen. The group of friends start thinking about their future high school plans, and Shuichi and Anna start dating again.

Shuichi begins attending the same all-boy high school as Makoto and Doi, while Yoshino and Saori begin attending a high school where uniforms are not required. Saori starts dating Fumiya Ninomiya. Yoshino starts working at Anna's modeling agency and Shuichi begins working at a cafe, but later quits. Shuichi starts writing a semi-autobiographical novel. Yoshino later tells Shuichi that they no longer wish to be seen as male and have decided to continue living as a girl. They also confess a romantic attraction to Shuichi and the pair briefly hold hands before saying goodbye. Shuichi informs Anna of her true gender identity, and much to her surprise Anna decides to stay in a relationship with her. After graduating from high school, Shuichi moves out and goes to the same college as Doi. Shuichi continues to write the novel, which is given the title The Boy Who's a Girl (ぼくは、おんなのこ, Boku wa, Onna no Ko).

== Characters ==
=== Protagonists ===
The main characters of Wandering Son (from left to right): Saori, Makoto, Shuichi, Chizuru, Yoshino, and Kanako

Shuichi Nitori (二鳥 修一, Nitori Shūichi)
Voiced by: Kōsuke Hatakeyama
Shuichi, one of two protagonists, is in the fifth grade of elementary school. She uses the first-person pronoun "boku" despite the fact that it's traditionally used by young boys. Otherwise known by the nicknames Shu (シュウ, Shū) and Nitorin (にとりん), Shuichi is trans and identifies as a girl. She is described as cute by many of the other characters and is able to convincingly pass as a cisgender girl when presenting as her identified gender, helped by her feminine face and build. Shuichi enjoys wearing cute clothes; although initially opposed to the idea of crossdressing, her friends Yoshino Takatsuki and Saori Chiba encourage her to dress and act femininely. As Shuichi grows up, puberty becomes a topic of increasing concern, such as the growth of body hair, a deepening voice, and the onset of pimples. She exhibits signs of gender dysphoria and displays an outward attraction to two characters in the series—Yoshino and Anna Suehiro. Shuichi and Anna date for a time in junior high, until she breaks off their relationship. However, the two soon resume their relationship with each other.
Shuichi is interested in doing indoor activities, and does not partake in activities favored by boys of the same age, such as playing sports. She enjoys and is skillful in baking sweet foods, though is never shown cooking other, more conventional foods. After starting an exchange diary with Yoshino, she becomes interested in writing stories, and even joins the drama club as a writer with Saori in junior high school after they co-write a rendition of Romeo and Juliet performed by members of their class. Shuichi has an honest personality, and easily gets along with others. As a child, she has an obedient, dutiful attitude.
However, upon entering puberty, she sometimes experiences outbursts of intense emotion. Shuichi can be overly sensitive at times and is often shown crying in front of others. Due to these personality quirks, it is easier for her to associate with girls of the same age. Accordingly, she has few male friends.

Yoshino Takatsuki (高槻 よしの, Takatsuki Yoshino)
Voiced by: Asami Seto
Yoshino, the other protagonist, is a tall, transmasculine child who at the beginning of Wandering Son is a fifth grader in Shuichi's class. He uses the first-person pronoun "watashi", which is gender-neutral. Otherwise known as Takatsuki-kun (高槻くん) by their classmates, with an honorific used mainly with boys, he wishes to be a boy. He usually refrains from dressing in traditionally feminine clothes, such as skirts or dresses. Despite this, his mother insists on buying such clothes for him. Shortly after becoming friends with Shuichi, Yoshino gets a short haircut, taking on a more masculine appearance like the other boys his age, especially when he is dressed in a male school uniform. Like Shuichi, he becomes increasingly concerned and resentful about undergoing puberty, such as at the beginning of menstruation or the growth of breasts. He goes to buy a chest-flattening garment to escape the necessity of wearing a bra. Like Shuichi, Yoshino shows consistent symptoms of gender dysphoria, gender nonconformity, and a desire to be seen as a gender he was not assigned at birth. He temporarily alleviates his dysphoria when he has personal exposure to modeling. By the end of the story Yoshino has adopted a more feminine appearance and admits that they no longer have the same desire to become a boy as they did in elementary school.
Yoshino prefers to dress and act like a boy, but usually abstains from anything which would draw too much attention, such as going to school in a male uniform after entering junior high. However, he does on occasion dress in a male school uniform and go to neighboring cities while presenting as a boy; during one such time, he enjoys being hit on by an older woman. Yoshino wants to look "cool" and wears clothes which are not girlish. When teased by others, he is prone to getting emotional and is known to get violent on occasion. He takes up an interest in basketball after entering junior high school and joins the female basketball team with Chizuru Sarashina. In junior high, he decides not to get a haircut after a comment by Saori, but later cuts it back to a short, masculine style. However, by the end of high school Yoshino has voluntarily grown it out long again and continues to present as female. Yoshino's family consists of a father, mother, older brother, and older sister.

=== Classmates ===
Saori Chiba (千葉 さおり, Chiba Saori)
Voiced by: Yuuka Nanri
Saori, nicknamed Saorin (さおりん), is a girl who is a fifth grader in Shuichi's class at the beginning of Wandering Son. She takes an interest in encouraging Shuichi to cross-dress, even going so far as to buy Shuichi an expensive dress as a birthday gift, which Shuichi later returns, much to her displeasure. Saori finds it difficult to associate with others; she has few friends, though becomes close to Shuichi. She tends to convey what is on her mind and disregards how others may take what she says. As Saori grows up, she gradually becomes more standoffish and stoic; she even has bad relations with her teachers. Despite her self-centered attitude, she remains popular among her male classmates due to her physical attractiveness. She is a sensitive girl whose temper sometimes gets the better of her when reprimanding bullies that tease Shuichi, because of the latter's femininity and cross-dressing. Saori is often emotionally affected by circumstances involving Shuichi, because of her feelings for the latter. Saori converts to Christianity partly because of this influence of to seek forgiveness for her previous actions, though she only attends mass when feeling guilty about her behavior.

Kanako Sasa (佐々 かなこ, Sasa Kanako)
Voiced by: Yoshino Nanjō
Kanako Sasa, usually referred to by her surname, is a girl who is a fifth grader in Shuichi's class at the beginning of Wandering Son. She is sometimes called Kanabun (カナブン; lit. 'drone beetle') by her younger brother and Chizuru. She makes her first appearance in chapter two of the manga, but is not named until volume two. She is a short, energetic girl who thinks of herself as everyone's friend and becomes distressed when her friends fight among themselves. Sasa acts as a mediator between her friends in such times and tries not to leave anyone alone. She has been friends with Yoshino since pre-school, and later becomes close with Chizuru. Sasa is an innocent, childish girl who does not have many worries aside from her friends' quarrels. She tends to be a handful for her mother, who picks out her clothes for her and even helps her get ready for school in the morning. She mentions that if she thinks too hard about something, her brain becomes itchy.

Makoto Ariga (有賀 誠, Ariga Makoto)
Voiced by: Yūichi Iguchi
Makoto first appears when the cast is in sixth grade, though is in a different class. Known as Mako for short, though mostly only to Shuichi, she is also a trans girl; it is this desire that spurs her to become Shuichi's closest friend. Due to facial freckles and round glasses, she is not able to appear as cute as Shuichi when wearing feminine clothes. She is a romantic who wants to be in a relationship with a cool, adult man. She is unusually mature and is able to think calmly and objectively while providing advice to friends. She also gets along well with boys and girls of the same age, because of good listening skills, and often becomes an onlooker to what is going on in other characters' lives. Makoto is an only child whose parents run a bakery.

Chizuru Sarashina (更科 千鶴, Sarashina Chizuru)
Voiced by: Saeko Chiba
Chizuru, nicknamed Chii-chan, is a tall girl who first appears as a classmate of Shuichi when they both enter junior high school. She is Momoko's childhood friend, and has a stylish demeanor, highlighted by her stature and long hair, which captivates both Shuichi and Yoshino when they first meet her. Chizuru is described as a free spirit, someone who enjoys doing unconventional, often outrageous things which surprise those around her; she frequently acts without thinking, and as a result projects a childish personality. Her impulsive behavior sometimes gets her in trouble with other characters, but she quickly becomes ashamed when she realizes the consequences. She tries to be everyone's friend, though Saori strongly dislikes her impulsiveness. Chizuru joins the girls' basketball team in junior high. Her family runs a soba restaurant.

Momoko Shirai (白井 桃子, Shirai Momoko)
Voiced by: Aki Toyosaki
Momoko is a childhood friend and classmate of Chizuru in junior high school; she is nicknamed Momo. She constantly hangs around Chizuru and is visibly annoyed when Chizuru socializes with others, or even if someone simply sits too close to her. Momoko inevitably starts fighting Saori, who does not particularly respect Chizuru, when they talk.

=== Others ===
Maho Nitori (二鳥 真穂, Nitori Maho)
Voiced by: Nana Mizuki
Maho is Shuichi's sister. She is one year older than Shuichi is, and at the beginning of Wandering Son, she is in the sixth grade of elementary school. Maho shows a strong interest in clothes, and spends much of her money on new apparel. She is a big fan of a teen fashion model named Maiko, and to meet her, Maho auditions for the same modeling agency as Maiko. After she is hired and becomes recognized as a model, Maho enjoys being asked her autograph by complete strangers. While her modeling career initially starts out slowly, Maho soon gains confidence in her abilities, and becomes friends with Maiko and two other models, Anna Suehiro and Tamaki Satō. In contrast to her younger sibling, Maho is very out-spoken and tends to be rough with Shuichi, even hitting or slapping Shuichi on occasion, and she often forces things on Shuichi with little consideration of Shuichi's opinion. She does not like Shuichi's cross-dressing and gets angry and disturbed when she finds Shuichi dressed as a girl. In junior high school, Maho becomes attracted to her classmate Riku Seya, and eventually starts dating him.

Riku Seya (瀬谷 理久, Seya Riku)
Voiced by: Yoshitsugu Matsuoka
Riku Seya, usually referred to by his surname, is a classmate of Maho's who meets her when they enter junior high school. He is generally a soft-spoken boy who initially takes an interest in Shuichi, whom he believes to be a cisgender girl, when they first meet. When he learns that she is assigned male, Seya becomes angry at Maho for hiding this and stringing him along, but he soon reconciles with her and eventually starts dating her. Seya remains polite with Shuichi, though due to their initial meeting, there is always some awkwardness between the two.

Anna Suehiro (末広 安那, Suehiro Anna)
Voiced by: Yui Horie
Anna is a teen model who is a good friend of Maiko and goes to the same all-girl school as her; she is similarly well-known and experienced in modeling. She is considered outspoken and sharp-tongued by other models. Anna at first disapproves of Shuichi dressing as a girl, and even calls her a freak soon after meeting her. Anna initially tells Maho she has no interest in her "weak" sibling because of Shuichi's femininity, though later dates her for a time after Shuichi asks her out. Anna would later break up with her, however, the two soon resume their relationship with each other once more. Furthermore, Anna's opinion of Shuichi presenting as female also changes, she says that it actually suits her, and the two even go out together on a date with Shuichi presenting as a girl. Anna feels Shuichi is an interesting person, and once says she is like a cute little sister. Anna spends a lot of money on clothes, and enjoys modifying them.

Yuki (ユキ)
Voiced by: Takako Honda
Yuki, born Hiroyuki Yoshida (吉田 紘之, Yoshida Hiroyuki), is a tall and attractive trans woman living with her boyfriend Shiina. She takes an early interest in Yoshino when she believes him to be a cisgender boy, though remains on good terms with him even after learning of his assigned sex. She also gives Shuichi and Yoshino helpful advice when they are troubled. Despite the differences between their situations, Yuki sees much of herself in Shuichi: when they were growing up, Shiina was the only friend who stood by the young Hiroyuki, as she was called then, while girls teased her and the boys bullied her to change. Yuki always keeps up a positive attitude, and runs a gay bar. Since her transition, she has not been on good terms with her parents, who run a uniform store.
Yuki is the main character of Takako Shimura's short story "Hana" (花), in the collection Boku wa, Onna no Ko (ぼくは、おんなのこ), in which her family—which consists of her father, mother, brother, and sister-in-law—also appears; Yuki is revealed to be a fan of Keiji Sada, a Shōwa period actor.

Shiina (椎名)
Voiced by: Keiji Fujiwara
Shiina, given name unknown, otherwise referred to by his nickname Shii (しー), is another adult friend of Shuichi and Yoshino. He was Yuki's classmate in elementary school, and he eventually became her boyfriend after her transition. Unlike Yuki, Shiina had many friends in school. He generally just watches over Shuichi and Yoshino with Yuki, but he sometimes does bold and unexpected things, such as grabbing Yoshino's crotch when he first meets him because he feared that, because Yoshino was presenting as a boy at the time, Yuki might be having an illicit affair with him.

Fumiya Ninomiya (二宮 文弥, Ninomiya Fumiya)
Voiced by: Kaoru Mizuhara
Fumiya is a talkative boy one year older than Saori whom she meets when she starts going to church. Saori is easily annoyed by him, especially when he brings her flowers from his parents' flower shop. He takes an early interest in Saori and tries to become her boyfriend. After meeting Shuichi, Fumiya becomes jealous of Saori's interest in her, and finds her cross-dressing gross. While initially lying to Saori and Shuichi about having an interest in cross-dressing, he is later seen dressed as a girl while out with Shuichi, and again at the cultural festival at Shuichi's school. Fumiya enjoys the added attention that comes from cross-dressing and admits that he likes being called cute.

Shinpei Doi (土居伸平, Doi Shinpei)
Voiced by: Hiroyuki Yoshino
Shinpei is a classmate of Shuichi. He tends to be confident in himself and in his opinions. In junior high school, he often bullies Shuichi for a perceived lack of masculinity, but he has a change of heart once in high school after meeting Yuki. His admiration and gradual approval of Shuichi presenting as a girl tempers his overbearing attitude, and he tries to befriend her, attempting to apologize for his past conduct. He even begins encouraging her to come to school dressed as a girl.

Maiko (麻衣子)
Voiced by: Ai Takabe
Maiko is a classmate and best friend of Anna Suehiro. She is a singer and model. She has a large fan base among Shuichi's classmates.

== Production ==
In an interview in August 2003, Takako Shimura stated that the theme of Wandering Son is similar to the second half of her previous manga series Shikii no Jūnin. Shimura took the junior high school teacher Kentarō Kaneda from Shikii no Jūnin and inserted him into Wandering Son, where he teaches at Shuichi's junior high school, because she really liked his character. Shimura originally planned to use a female high school student who wants to become a boy as the main character. However, she realized that a boy who wants to become a girl before entering into puberty would have many worries related to growing up, and changed the story accordingly. Shimura used her realization that the boy would go through significant changes as he grew up to deepen the development of the story and characters. The Japanese title, Hōrō Musuko, is a pun on hōtō musuko (放蕩息子), meaning "prodigal son".

Shimura mainly found her characters' names by looking through name dictionaries, although she also took the names of acquaintances and slightly changed them, and even used train station names for side characters appearing only once. Out of all the characters, Shimura is most pleased with Kanako Sasa. For the designs of clothes for the female characters, Shimura consulted various fashion magazines for girls in their early teens, especially Nicola. Shimura commented self-deprecatingly in the afterword of volume one that, like her other series, her characters do not look very different from each other, her panels are too white, and there is much pathos.

== Media ==
=== Manga ===
The manga Wandering Son is written and illustrated by Takako Shimura. It was serialized in the monthly seinen (aimed at younger adult men) manga magazine Comic Beam from the December 2002 to August 2013 issue. The individual chapters were collected and published in 15 tankōbon volumes by Enterbrain from July 25, 2003, to August 28, 2013. Wandering Son was one of several manga titles included with the launch in December 2009 of the manga distribution service of the PlayStation Store for the Japanese PlayStation Portable handheld game console.

The series is licensed in English by Fantagraphics Books, which began releasing the series in North America in hardcover format starting with the first volume on July 5, 2011. Gary Groth of Fantagraphics Books said in an interview he licensed Wandering Son because "it's not a typical choice for a manga title published in the U.S. and it's not typical subject matter for comics in general," saying that the subject is "perfectly legitimate ... for literature—or comics." Although Fantagraphics Books released eight volumes by June 2015, the release of further volumes was hampered by low sales. The series is also licensed by Ever Glory Publishing in Taiwan and by Haksan Publishing in Korea.

=== Anime ===
A 12-episode anime television series adaptation produced by AIC Classic and Aniplex aired in Japan between January 13 and March 31, 2011, on Fuji TV's Noitamina programming block. Crunchyroll simulcasted the anime on their streaming website. However, it was removed from Crunchyroll on April 21, 2021. Aniplex released the anime on six Blu-ray and DVD compilation volumes in Japan between April 27 and September 21, 2011. Of the 11 episodes to be aired on TV, episodes 10 and 11 were edited into a single episode, and were released individually on their respective BD/DVD volumes. Following the arrest of Ai Takabe, the voice actress who played Maiko, for drug possession in October 2015, Bandai Channel removed the series from its streaming catalog. The anime adapts the story from the point where the characters enter junior high school.

The anime is directed by Ei Aoki and the screenplay was written by Mari Okada. Chief animator Ryūichi Makino based the character design used in the anime on Takako Shimura's original concept and the main animator is Michio Satō. The music was produced by Satoru Kosaki and Keiichi Okabe, both from Monaca, and the sound director is Jin Aketagawa. The anime's opening theme song is "Itsudatte" (いつだって。) by Daisuke and the single was released on March 2, 2011. The ending theme is "For You" by Rie fu and the single was released on February 16, 2011. The original soundtrack was released on August 24, 2011.

== Reception ==
It was reported in June 2013 that approximately 1.05 million copies of the manga are in print in Japan. Wandering Son was selected as a recommended work by the awards jury of the tenth Japan Media Arts Festival in 2006. The Young Adult Library Services Association nominated Wandering Son for its 2012 Great Graphic Novels for Teens list. The anime was awarded the honorable mention prize for technical achievement in broadcast animation at the 65th Motion Picture and Television Engineering Society of Japan Awards in 2012.

In a review of the first volume by Rebecca Silverman of Anime News Network (ANN), she praised the slow pace of the storytelling, which "gives it a more realistic feel." Silverman praises Takako Shimura for making Shuichi into a "human protagonist", but notes that "most of the children act much older than they are." The second volume was featured in ANN's Right Turn Only column in March 2007 as the Import of the Month, where Carlo Santos lauded the series for using gender reversal as the "actual heart of the story" in contrast to "every other series" involving cross-dressing, which use "gender reversal as a goofy plot device." The art was praised as "simple [with] few lines, but incredibly expressive" which Santos claimed is a "style that's the most difficult and beautiful of all." Santos criticized the "emotional realism" of the work for having the young characters' "unrealistically mature attitude" towards "issues above their grade level."

Rachel Thorn, the English translator of the manga, wrote that fans of Anne of Green Gables or The Rose of Versailles would also enjoy Wandering Son, and Silverman compared Wandering Son to Mizuiro Jidai. Thorn described the art as "clean and lovely" and went on to cite Wandering Son as "sweet, thought-provoking, funny, and moving, and I think it will resonate with readers regardless of their gender identity or sexual orientation." The first manga volume as translated by Fantagraphics Books had an early debut at the May 2011 Toronto Comic Arts Festival and sold out within the first two hours of the event.
