= Takako Shimura =

Japanese manga artist

- Born: October 23, 1973 (age 53) Kanagawa Prefecture, Japan
- Area: Manga artist
- Notable works: Wandering Son; Sweet Blue Flowers; Scenes from Awajima

Takako Shimura (Japanese: 志村貴子, Hepburn: Shimura Takako; born October 23, 1973) is a Japanese manga artist. She is primarily known for her manga works which feature LGBTQ+ (especially lesbian and transgender) topics.

== Career ==
Her best known and selling series are Aoi Hana and Wandering Son. Aoi Hana was adapted as an anime television series broadcast in 2009. Wandering Son has been licensed in English by Fantagraphics Books and an anime adaptation aired in 2011. In 2014, she collaborated with the original character concepts for the anime Aldnoah.Zero. In 2016, she provided the character designs for the anime Battery.

Aside from her publications as a professional manga artist, she is also active in amateur manga. In 2009, she formed a doujinshi circle named "Harapeko Sentai Hashi Ranger" together with fellow manga artists Hisae Iwaoka, Fumiko Tanagawa, Aoki Toshinao, and Ishide Den.

== Works ==
- Shikii no Jūnin (敷居の住人) (1997–2002, 7 volumes)
- Seikatsu Ijishō (生活維持省) (2003, one-shot)
- Boku wa, Onna no Ko (ぼくはおんなのこ) (2003, 1 volume)
  - Boku wa Onna no Ko (ぼくはおんなのこ) (1997, debut story)
  - Rakuen ni Ikō (楽園に行こう)
  - Shōnen no Musume (少年の娘)
  - Akemi no Theme: Teruo-hen (アケミのテーマ テルオ編)
  - Akemi no Theme: Yoshio-hen (アケミのテーマ ヨシオ編)
  - Akemi no Theme: Haruo-hen (アケミのテーマ ハルオ編)
  - Hana (花)
  - sweet16
- Happy-Go-Lucky Days (どうにかなる日々, Dōnika Naru Hibi) (2002–2004, 2 volumes)
- Love Buzz (ラヴ・バズ) (2002–2005, 3 volumes)
- Wandering Son (放浪息子, Hōrō Musuko) (2002–2013, 15 volumes)
- Sweet Blue Flowers (青い花, Aoi Hana) (2004–2013, 8 volumes)
- Kawaii Akuma (かわいい悪魔) (1 volume)
- Toaru Hi (とあるひ) (2004–2005, 2 chapters)
- Route 225 (ルート225) (adaptation of the Chiya Fujino novel, 2007–2008, 1 volume)
- Fushō no Musuko (不肖の息子) (2009, one-shot)
- Scenes from Awajima (淡島百景, Awajima Hyakkei) (2011–2024, 5 volumes)
- Musume no Iede (娘の家出) (2012–2017, 6 volumes)
- Okite Saisho ni Suru Koto wa (起きて最初にすることは, First Thing I Do When I Wake Up) (2013, 1 volume)
- Wagamama Chie-chan (わがままちえちゃん) (2014–2015, 1 volume)
- Original character concepts for Aldnoah.Zero (2014)
- Koi Iji (こいいじ) (2014–2019, 10 volumes)
- Sayonara, Otoko no Ko (さよなら、おとこのこ) (2016–2020, 3 volumes)
- Beautiful Everyday (ビューティフル・エブリデイ) (2018–present, 2+ volumes)
- Even Though We're Adults (おとなになっても Otona ni nattemo) (2019–2023, 10 volumes)
- Bloom Brothers (ブルーム・ブラザーズ) (2020–present, 1+ volume)
