= SideScrollers =

Graphic novel by Matthew Loux

Publication information
- Publisher: Oni Press
- Schedule: Single Issue
- Format: Graphic Novel
- Publication date: 2006
- No. of issues: 1
- Main character(s): Brian, Brad and Matt

Creative team
- Created by: Matthew Loux
- Written by: Matthew Loux
- Artist(s): Matthew Loux

SideScrollers is a graphic novel by Matthew Loux, published by Oni Press.

== Plot ==
Brian, Brad and Matt are good guys with no direction and zero motivation. They play video games, eat junk food and kick around town without a care in the world. But their serene laziness disappears when Matt's crush, Amber, announces her intention to accompany Matt's nemesis, Richard the jock, to the big rock show. Determined to steer her away from the jerk, the boys must overcome an irate football team, a vengeful troop of Girly Scouts and a seriously evil cat, in a giant rock 'n' roll videogame adventure!

== Reviews ==
The comic was named one of YALSA's 2008 top ten graphic novels.
