= List of Sweet Blue Flowers episodes =

The cover of the first Japanese DVD compilation released by Media Factory on October 23, 2009.

The Sweet Blue Flowers Japanese anime television series is based on the manga series of the same name written and illustrated by Takako Shimura. The episodes, produced by J.C.Staff, are directed by Kenichi Kasai, written by Fumihiko Takayama, and features character design by Masayuki Onchi who based the designs on Shimura's original concept. Many of the episode titles are novel titles as well. For example, Hana Monogatari is a novel by Nobuko Yoshiya, while Haru no Arashi (Gertrud) and Seishun wa Uruwashi (Schön ist die Jugend) are novels by Hermann Hesse.

The story focuses on Fumi Manjōme, a lesbian high school girl, and her close childhood friend Akira Okudaira who tries to keep her friends happy through difficult times. Eleven episodes were produced which aired in Japan between July 2 and September 10, 2009, on Fuji TV as the third series in Fuji TV's Noise timeslot. Five DVD compilation volumes were released by Media Factory between October 23, 2009, and February 25, 2010. Two pieces of theme music are used for the episodes; one opening theme and one ending theme. The opening theme is "Aoi Hana" (青い花) by Kukikodan, and the ending theme is "Centifolia" (センティフォリア, Sentiforia) by Ceui.

== Episode list ==
No.	Title	Original release date
1	"A Flower's Tale"; Transliteration: "Hana Monogatari" (Japanese: 花物語)	July 2, 2009
Fumi Manjōme is starting her high school life at Matsuoka Girl's High School. Her family moved back to Kamakura, and when she was in grade school, her best friend was Akira Okudaira; Akira is starting high school at Fujigaya Girls Academy, a prestigious institution, and meets a girl in her class named Kyōko Ikumi. On the first day commute to their respective schools, Fumi and Akira run into each other, but do not realize this until after Fumi and her mother pay a visit to the Okudaira residence. Later, Fumi discovers that her cousin Chizu is getting married, which comes to a great shock to her as Fumi has feelings for her cousin.
2	"Spring Storm"; Transliteration: "Haru no Arashi" (Japanese: 春の嵐)	July 9, 2009
Trying to figure out what club to join, Fumi chances by the literary club when a handsome upperclassman exits, and invites Fumi to join. Later, the girl introduces herself as Yasuko Sugimoto, a member of the basketball club, and Fumi joins that club immediately. At Fujigaya, Akira and Kyōko join the drama club, though they are only going to be working backstage for the upcoming adaptation of Wuthering Heights. Yasuko is asked by Fujigaya's drama club to play Heathcliff, and Fumi comes too, along with her friends Yōko Honatsugi, Misako Yasuda, and Miwa Motegi from Matsuoka. Fumi walks around the Fujigaya campus, entranced by the architecture and atmosphere, and sees a crying Kyōko exit a room.
3	"When I Wake in the Morning"; Transliteration: "Asa Mezamashite wa" (Japanese: 朝目覚めては)	July 16, 2009
Yasuko comes out of the room Kyōko just exited and asks Fumi to share a talk outside. Fumi tells Yasuko she is leaving the basketball club for lack of athleticism and Yasuko expresses regret for it. Yasuko asks Fumi on a date before Yōko jumps in saying it is time to leave. Kyōko invites Akira on a group date organized by her fiance (in name only) Kō Sawanoi, but Akira's older brother Shinobu embarrasses Akira to tears during the date when Kō realizes a man in sunglasses has been staring at them all day. During this time, Yasuko and Fumi are on their date, walking around town and take in a view of the sea. Akira later yells at her brother for embarrassing her, though Shinobu merely expresses concern for a man taking his younger sister home. Fumi formally joins the literary club and afterwards Yasuko takes Fumi to the library room where they share their first kiss.
4	"Youth is Beautiful"; Transliteration: "Seishun wa Uruwashi" (Japanese: 青春は美わし)	July 23, 2009
Yasuko and Fumi become a couple and Yasuko wants to start going to school in the mornings with Fumi, but Fumi realizes too late that she already made that arrangement with Akira beforehand. Fumi wants to continue just going to school with Akira, but in exchange, she and Yasuko will have time together after school. Fumi resolutely tells Akira that she still wants to go to school with only her and in the process comes out to her about her relationship with Yasuko. Akira at first does not know how to respond, but after seeking advice from Kyōko decides the only thing she can do for Fumi is support her. Yasuko and Fumi, along with Yōko, Misako and Miwa, go back to Fujigaya where Yasuko takes part in a read-through of the script for Wuthering Heights and greets the drama club's adviser Masanori Kagami. Fumi wonders about the "Mistress of the Library" story Yasuko told her and who the involved parties were.
5	"Wuthering Heights (part 1)"; Transliteration: "Arashi ga Oka (zenpen)" (Japanese: 嵐が丘 (前編))	July 30, 2009
Fumi confides in Akira that she suspects Yasuko is in love with another person, and after school Fumi learns that Kyōko is in love with Yasuko. Fumi does not go with Yasuko to rehearsal since she feels awkward being around Kyōko. Akira notices that Yasuko is very popular with other girls, and sees why Fumi would not want to come. Kyōko realizes the other girls are not actually in love with Yasuko. Kyōko had asked Yasuko to treat her like nothing had happened between them, but Kyōko says she was merely acting strong. Yasuko goes to see Fumi at night and gets her to agree to come help with the reception desk the following day. Akira chides Fumi for forgetting to tell Yasuko she has been feeling jealous of the attention Yasuko has been receiving from other girls.
6	"Wuthering Heights (part 2)"; Transliteration: "Arashi ga Oka (kōhen)" (Japanese: 嵐が丘 (後編))	August 6, 2009
Akira is embarrassed when her parents and brother come, and she unwillingly goes with them to the dining area. Yasuko consoles the lead in The Little Prince, and by the time that play has begun, Fumi goes to buy a bouquet of blue flowers for Yasuko. Meanwhile, the high school division is getting ready for Wuthering Heights. The play is well-received, and when Fumi leaves to give Yasuko the bouquet, she sees Yasuko crying among the other actresses after Kagami thanks her for a job well done. Fumi finally tells Yasuko how she has felt Yasuko loves someone else, but Yasuko says that it is all in the past. In the end, Fumi was not able to give Yasuko the bouquet.
7	"When the New Leaves Grow"; Transliteration: "Wakaba no Koro" (Japanese: 若葉のころ)	August 13, 2009
Still concerned about what Yasuko said about her past relationship, Fumi decides to skip school to go to Yokohama with Akira who had school off due to the drama festival. At the end of the day, Fumi asks to stay over at Akira's home for the night and she agrees. Fumi finally goes to see Yasuko the following day and Yasuko invites her to meet her family on the weekend. There, she meets Yasuko's three elder sisters and their mother. Yasuko suddenly reveals to them that she is dating Fumi, and her sister Kuri teases her a bit, causing Yasuko to go to her room. Fumi tries to talk with Yasuko a couple more times that night, but Yasuko starts to doubt both of their feelings, and decides to break up with her.
8	"Love is Blind"; Transliteration: "Koi wa Mōmoku" (Japanese: 恋は盲目)	August 20, 2009
Following Fumi's break-up with Yasuko, Kuri offers to drive her home and tells her that Kazusa, the third-eldest Sugimoto sister, is going to marry Kagami in September; news of this quickly arrives at Fujigaya though Yasuko informing the school newspaper. Fumi speaks to Akira about her break-up, and Akira confronts Yasuko the next day about it. Yasuko takes Akira off a stop early to talk in a café, and Akira later goes to see Fumi who also skipped school and thanks Akira for being considerate. Kyōko invites Akira to come to Kō's summer house for summer vacation, and wants her to invite Fumi and her friends as well. Akira accidentally lets slip to Kyōko about Fumi's break up, and Kyōko later goes to see Yasuko who is annoyed at Kyōko's stubbornness. Akira, Fumi and Kyōko later go to the usual café together, and Kyōko and Fumi cannot help but cry at their sorry states.
9	"A Midsummer Night's Dream"; Transliteration: "Natsu no Yo no Yume" (Japanese: 夏の夜の夢)	August 27, 2009
Kyōko brings Fumi and her friends, as well as Akira and her brother Shinobu, to her fiancee Kō's summer villa. Kyōko leads them onto a route where she was once lost and found by Kō as a child. The gang have fun telling ghost stories, cooking curry and doing a test of courage, though Akira is easily frightened. Fumi compliments Kyōko on a painting of hers she saw earlier and Kyōko says she drew it when she first fell in love with Yasuko. Meanwhile, Kō laments to Akira that he wishes to be the one Kyōko is in love with. Miwa Motegi becomes interested in Akira's brother, saying that she thinks he is cool. Akira lay awake at night noticing that her friends all have someone they like and wondering how she will act when she finally falls in love with someone. While finding a midnight snack, Fumi and Akira notice the beautiful night sky and stay up late to watch it, both catching a cold in the process.
10	"The Prince of Happiness"; Transliteration: "Kōfuku na Ōji" (Japanese: 幸福の王子)	September 3, 2009
Akira and Kyōko are invited by Yasuko to Kazusa and Kagami's wedding, with Kō and Shinobu tagging along. Fumi meanwhile, unable to contact Akira, goes out on her own. Yasuko is a little flustered when Kagami compliments her outfit. After the wedding, Akira joins up with Fumi in Enoshima, who is surprised to find she has brought Yasuko with her. Fumi decides she does not want to walk with Yasuko, and ignores her for the rest of the day. Yasuko remembers when she fell for Kagami, and cut her hair, later inspiring Kyōko to do the same, before being rejected and transferring schools as a result. They later go to the Enoshima Caves, where Fumi tells Yasuko she has given up on her and tells her to grow up.
11	"Winter's Fireworks"; Transliteration: "Fuyu no Hanabi" (Japanese: 冬の花火)	September 10, 2009
As the new term starts, Fumi does some work in the library and is reminded of her first kiss with Yasuko. She later sees her at the station, but does not talk to her. Kyōko hears from Kazusa that Yasuko is going to be studying abroad in London, so she sends her a text to wish her well. Fumi receives of photo from Chizu, and recalls the first person she fell in love with. Kō later asks Akira to shop with him, but Fumi sees them together and wonders if they are now dating. On Christmas Eve, Akira holds a party with Fumi and her friends, where they look through old photo albums. Later that night, Akira and Fumi visit their old elementary school, and Fumi realizes the person she first fell in love with was Akira.

== See also ==
- List of Sweet Blue Flowers chapters
