= List of Sweet Blue Flowers chapters =

The cover of the first volume of the Sweet Blue Flowers manga released by Ohta Publishing on December 15, 2005, in Japan.

The manga series Sweet Blue Flowers is written and illustrated by Takako Shimura. The series was serialized in Manga Erotics F between November 17, 2004, and July 6, 2013. The chapters were released in eight tankōbon volumes released by Ohta Publishing under their F×comics imprint between December 15, 2005, and September 12, 2013, in Japan. Viz Media licensed the manga for a physical release in North America as a 2-in-1 omnibus edition with a new translation. The manga already had an English digital release before this. The manga has been licensed for release in French by Asuka under the title Fleurs Bleues. Sweet Blue Flowers was adapted as an 11-episode anime television series by J.C.Staff which aired in Japan between July and September 2009 on Fuji TV. The story focuses on Fumi Manjōme, a lesbian high school girl, and her close childhood friend Akira Okudaira who tries to keep her friends happy through difficult times.

== Volume list ==
No.	Original release date	Original ISBN	English release date	English ISBN
1	December 15, 2005	978-4-7783-2005-8	September 19, 2017 (North America); November 2, 2017 (UK)	978-1-42-159298-5
1. "Flower Tales" (花物語, "Hana Monogatari"); 2. "Stand By Me" (スタンド・バイ・ミー, "Stando Bai Mī"); 3. "Spring Storm" (春の嵐, "Haru no Arashi"); 4. "When I Wake Up in the Morning" (朝目覚めては, "Asa Mezamete wa"); 5. "The Secret Garden" (秘密の花園, "Himitsu no Hanazono"); 6. "Adolescence is Beautiful" (青春は美わし, "Seishun wa Uruwashi"); 7. "Wuthering Heights (1)" (嵐が丘＜1＞, "Arashi ga Oka (Ichi)")
Akira Okudaira is starting her high school life at Fujigaya Girls Academy, and on the first day's commute, meets a tall girl who goes to Matsuoka Girl's High School. Later that day, she meets her childhood friend Fumi Manjōme after ten years of being apart, and they discover they met each other earlier when going to school. Akira and Fumi are close friends once again, and Akira helps console Fumi after she finds out her female cousin Chizu (whom she has feelings for) is getting married. Fumi meets a tall, attractive upperclassman girl at her school named Yasuko Sugimoto whom she is enamored by. Akira joins the drama club at her school with her classmate and friend Kyōko Ikumi. Yasuko, who used to go to Fujigaya, is asked to act in the upcoming play adaptation of Wuthering Heights Fujigaya is performing, and Fumi goes with her to help along with her friends Yōko Honatsugi, Misako Yasuda, and Miwa Motegi. Akira meets Kyōko's fiancé (in name only) Kō Sawanoi while Yasuko and Fumi are out on a date together. Yasuko soon comes on to Fumi and they kiss in the library; they become a couple and start dating. Fumi comes out to Akira and asks for her advice, and Akira does her best to support her friend's new relationship. Fumi finds out that Kyōko is in love with Yasuko, and even confessed her love to her, but was turned down.
2	December 13, 2006	978-4-7783-2032-4	September 19, 2017 (North America); November 2, 2017 (UK)	978-1-42-159298-5
8. "Wuthering Heights (2)" (嵐が丘＜2＞, "Arashi ga Oka (Ni)"); 9. "Wuthering Heights (3)" (嵐が丘＜3＞, "Arashi ga Oka (San)"); 10. "Days of Youth" (若葉のころ, "Wakaba no Koro"); 11. "The New Dawn" (新しき日, "Atarashiki Hi"); 12. "Take No Farewell" (さよならは言わないで, Sayonara wa Iwanaide); 13. "Love is Blind" (恋は盲目, "Koi wa Mōmoku")
Everyone is getting excited about the culture festival and the plays Fujigaya is doing. The high school division is doing Wuthering Heights, the junior high school is doing Little Women, and the elementary school is doing The Little Prince. The plays are well-received, especially Wuthering Heights. Fumi tells Yasuko that she feels Yasuko is in love with someone else, despite Yasuko saying that is all in the past. Akira takes Fumi to visit her aunt whom she feels is scary, and later Fumi stays overnight at Akira's house. Fumi gets invited to Yasuko's huge house and meets her older sisters and mother. While there, Yasuko comes out to her family and tells them she and Fumi are now dating. Yasuko breaks up with Fumi soon after, and Fumi finds out that Yasuko's sister Kazusa is marrying a teacher from Fujigaya named Masanori Kagami. Yasuko had fallen in love with him, and since she still has feelings for him, broke up with Fumi. Akira skips school one day to go to a cafe with Yasuko, and Akira feels bad that she is butting into other people's problems. Summer vacation is coming up, and Kyōko invites Akira and her friends to come along with her to go with Kō's family to a summer home in Kiyosato, Yamanashi. Kyōko decides to take art lessons from Kazusa once again.
3	March 18, 2008	978-4-7783-2053-9	December 19, 2017 (North America); January 11, 2018 (UK)	978-1-42-159299-2
14. "A Midsummer Night's Dream (Part 1)" (夏の夜の夢＜前編＞, "Natsu no Yo no Yume (Zenpen)"); 15. "A Midsummer Night's Dream (Part 2)" (夏の夜の夢＜後編＞, "Natsu no Yo no Yume (Kōhen)"); 16. "The Happy Prince (Part 1)" (幸福な王子＜前編＞, "Kōfuku na Ōji (Zenpen)"); 17. "The Happy Prince (Part 2)" (幸福な王子＜後編＞, "Kōfuku na Ōji (Kōhen)"); 18. "Winter Fireworks" (冬の花火, "Fuyu no Hanabi")
Akira and her friends enjoy their time at Kō's summer home, playing tennis, taking a hike in the surrounding area, and camp out in cabins. Akira and Fumi stay up late at night looking at the stars and they both end up catching colds. As Akira's friends go horseback riding, she overhears Kō's mother saying she does not want strangers coming over, and is found out when Kō's mother opens the door. Miwa starts to take notice in Akira's brother Shinobu, saying that she thinks he is cool. Akira goes to Kazusa's and Masanori's wedding and meets up with Kyōko and Kō. Yasuko finds out that her sister Kuri also had fallen in love with Masanori. Fumi calls Akira to see if she wants to come to Enoshima with her, and Yasuko wants to come too. However, Fumi is still mad at her, and so Fumi stays with Akira while Yasuko is left to be with Shinobu. Kyōko reveals to the others that Yasuko is going to be studying abroad in London after she graduates. Miwa finally confesses to Shinobu that she likes him, and Fumi tells Akira that she was her first love, much to Akira's embarrassment. Akira goes with Kō (Kyōko could not come) to go shopping for Christmas presents, and Fumi later wonders if Akira and Kō are now going out.
4	April 23, 2009	978-4-7783-2084-3	December 19, 2017 (North America); January 11, 2018 (UK)	978-1-42-159299-2
19. "Spring Bell" (春の鐘, "Haru no Kane"); 20. "Tsujigahana" (辻が花); 21. "Rokumeikan (1)" (鹿鳴館＜1＞, "Rokumeikan (Ichi)"); 22. "Rokumeikan (2)" (鹿鳴館＜2＞, "Rokumeikan (Ni)"); 23. "Rokumeikan (3)" (鹿鳴館＜3＞, "Rokumeikan (San)"); 24. "Rokumeikan (4)" (鹿鳴館＜4＞, "Rokumeikan (Yon)"); 25. "Faster Than Love" (愛より速く, "Ai yori Hayaku")
The new school year has begun, and Akira and her friends are now in their second year. Akira and Kyōko meet an energetic first-year student named Haruka Ōno who joins the drama club soon after. Akira and Kyōko are split into different classrooms, and Akira meets a tall girl in her new class named Ryōko Ueda. At Matsuoka, only Miwa (who is already going out with Shinobu) gets put into a different class than her friends. The high school division at Fujigaya is putting on the play Rokumeikan this year and Akira really gets into the story. Haruka finds Ryōko reciting lines from Rokumeikan in the library and takes her back to the drama club to recruit her, though she only agrees to do it after Akira agrees to act alongside her. The seniors want Fumi to come back again since they heard from Yasuko that she was good at acting, though Fumi is the only one among them that has no acting talent. Haruka tries to talk with her and get her to speak louder by breathing from the abdomen, but Fumi soon withdraws from the play. Fumi and Haruka become friends, and Haruka confides in Fumi one day that she suspects her older sister may like women. Not knowing how to respond, Fumi seeks advice from Akira, but ends up confessing her love for her instead.
5	February 18, 2010	978-4-7783-2108-6	March 20, 2018 (North America); April 5, 2018 (UK)	978-1-42-159300-5
26. "Rokumeikan (5)" (鹿鳴館＜5＞, "Rokumeikan (Go)"); 27. "Rokumeikan (6)" (鹿鳴館＜6＞, "Rokumeikan (Roku)"); 28. "Rokumeikan (7)" (鹿鳴館＜7＞, "Rokumeikan (Nana)"); 29. "Rokumeikan (8)" (鹿鳴館＜8＞, "Rokumeikan (Hachi)"); 30. "After the Banquet" (宴のあと, "Utage no Ato"); 31. "The Door into Summer (Part 1)" (夏への扉＜前編＞, "Natsu e no Tobira (Zenpen)")
Akira feels awkward about seeing Fumi after she confessed her love for her, and Haruka feels she needs to apologize to Fumi, thinking what she said was the reason for her quitting the play. Kō suggests to Kyōko to break off the engagement. The day of the play at Fujigaya, Fumi apologizes to Akira for saying something weird, and Fumi just wants to stay friends with her. Haruka apologizes to Fumi, but Fumi responds by saying it is not her fault for the way she has been acting, and that it is in fact because she is in love with another girl. Fumi is introduced to Haruka's older sister Orie. As she awaits the beginning of the play, Akira is feeling nervous, and cannot stop shaking. Fumi gives her a flower bouquet and reminds her that she has always been a strong person, so everything will be fine. The play goes well, though Akira later feels bad that she forgot one of her lines. Kyōko does not want Kō to break off the engagement, but he ends up finally breaking up with her. As summer vacation nears, Haruka invites Akira to come with her to Hakone to visit her grandfather who owns an old inn. Fumi, Misako, Yōko and Miwa also get invited as thanks for their help during Fujigaya's drama festival.
6	May 12, 2011	978-4-7783-2141-3	March 20, 2018 (North America); April 5, 2018 (UK)	978-1-42-159300-5
32. "The Door into Summer (Part 2)" (夏への扉＜中編＞, "Natsu e no Tobira (Chūhen)"); 33. "The Door into Summer (Part 3)" (夏への扉＜後編＞, "Natsu e no Tobira (Kōhen)"); 34. "As You Like It" (お気に召すまま, "O Ki ni Mesu Mama"); 35. "Love Planet" (恋する惑星, "Koisuru Wakusei"); 36. "First Love" (はつ恋, "Hatsukoi"); 37. "The Lily of the Valley" (谷間の百合, "Tanima no Yuri"); 38. "A Christmas Carol" (クリスマスキャロル, "Kurisumasu Kyaroru")
7	July 19, 2012	978-4-7783-2170-3	June 19, 2018 (North America); July 12, 2018 (UK)	—
39. "A Little Princess" (小公女, "Shōkōjo); 40. "A Small Love Melody (Part 1)" (小さな恋のメロディ＜前編＞, "Chīsa na Koi no Merodi (Zenpen)"); 41. "A Small Love Melody (Part 2)" (小さな恋のメロディ＜後編＞, "Chīsa na Koi no Merodi (Kōhen)"); 42. "Froth on the Daydream" (日々の泡, "Hibi no Awa"); 43. "The Girl in the Mirror" (鏡の中の少女, "Kagami no Naka no Shōjo"); 44. "On a Spring Night" (春の夜に, "Haru no Yoru ni"); 45. "The Three Musketeers" (三銃士, "Sanjūshi")
8	September 12, 2013	978-4-7783-2209-0	June 19, 2018 (North America); July 12, 2018 (UK)	—
46. "Girl's Prayers" (乙女の祈り, "Otome no Inori"); 47. "Crime and Punishment" (罪と罰, "Tsumi to Batsu"); 48. "This World's Flower" (この世の花, "Kono Yo no Hana"); 49. "Unrequited Love" (片恋, "Katakoi"); 50. "Waiting for You" (君待てども, "Kimi Matedomo"); 51. "Wandering in the Seventh World" (第七官界彷徨, "Dai Shichi Kankai Hōkō"); 52. "Sweet Blue Flowers" (青い花, "Aoi Hana")

== See also ==
- List of Sweet Blue Flowers episodes
