= Kamakura Museum =

Kamakura Museum may refer to:

- Museum of Modern Art, Kamakura & Hayama
- Museum of Modern Art, Kamakura & Hayama, Annex
- Kamakura Museum of Literature
- Kamakura Museum of National Treasures
- Kawakita Memorial Film Institute
