= Ristorante Paradiso =

Japanese manga and anime series

- Cover of the first manga volume

リストランテ・パラディーゾ (Risutorante Paradīzo)
- Genre: Romance
- Manga
- Written by: Natsume Ono
- Published by: Ohta Publishing
- English publisher: NA: Viz Media
- Magazine: Manga Erotics F
- Original run: May 2005 – March 2006
- Volumes: 1
- Manga

Gente: The People of Ristorante Paradiso
- Written by: Natsume Ono
- Published by: Ohta Publishing
- English publisher: NA: Viz Media
- Magazine: Manga Erotics F
- Original run: September 2006 – January 2009
- Volumes: 3
- Anime television series
- Directed by: Mitsuko Kase
- Written by: Shinichi Inotsume
- Music by: Ko-ko-ya
- Studio: David Production
- Licensed by: NA: Nozomi Entertainment
- Original network: Fuji TV (Noise)
- Original run: April 8, 2009 – June 24, 2009
- Episodes: 11
- icon

Ristorante Paradiso (Japanese: リストランテ・パラディーゾ, Hepburn: Risutorante Paradīzo), also known as Rispara (リスパラ, Risupara), is a Japanese manga series written and illustrated by Natsume Ono, detailing the daily lives of the staff of a restaurant in Rome. The first iteration of the series was serialized in Ohta Publishing's Manga Erotics F manga magazine between May 2005 and March 2006; it spanned one volume. A continuation, Gente: The People of Ristorante Paradiso (GENTE～リストランテの人々～, Gente ~Ristorante no Hitobito~), was serialized in the same magazine from September 2006 to January 2009. An anime adaptation, produced by David Production, aired on Fuji TV's late night Noise programming block from April to June 2009. The anime was also officially streamed with English subtitles by Crunchyroll. Both manga series, Ristorante Paradiso and Gente, have been licensed by Viz Media for an English-language release in North America.

== Characters ==
Nicoletta (ニコレッタ, Nikoretta)
Voiced by: Fumiko Orikasa
The protagonist of the series. 21 years old, Nicoletta is an energetic girl whose parents divorced when she was young and was as a result raised by her grandparents. Upon graduating from cooking school, she began working as an apprentice at the Casetta dell'Orso restaurant and is its only female staff. She has a crush on Claudio.
Santo Claudio Paradiso (サント・クラウディオ・パラディーゾ, Santo Kuraudio Paradīzo)
Voiced by: Jin Yamanoi
The head waiter of Casetta dell'Orso. He and his first wife Gabriella separated a few years previous to the start of the series. He still wears his wedding ring to dissuade women from pursuing him.
Luciano de Luca (ルチアーノ・デ・ルーカ, Ruchiāno de Rūka)
Voiced by: Mitsutaka Tachikawa
A waiter at Casetta dell'Orso. A very blunt but occasionally shy person. He is a widower, but still cares deeply for his departed wife, and ignores the advances of other women. He has a daughter, Rosemary, and a grandson, Francesco.
Vito (ヴィート, Vīto)
Voiced by: Takaya Kuroda
A waiter at Casetta dell'Orso. A very jovial person, he is married to a young woman who is a college student, whom he met through their mutual workout routines. He is a very flirtatious man, but openly reveals that he is already married and very much in love.
Gian Luigi Orsini (Gigi) (ジジ, Jiji)
Voiced by: Shigeo Kiyama
The sommelier at Casetta dell'Orso. A taciturn person, he is Lorenzo's half brother and cousin. Gigi rarely speaks, but by observing people, is able to tell what they are thinking, including perfectly matching one's taste with a wine. He is currently single.
Furio (フリオ)
Voiced by: Kazuhiko Nishimatsu
A chef. A friendly person. He is a devoted husband to his wife, Angela. He and Claudio previously worked in a hotel together when they were much younger.
Teo (テオ)
Voiced by: Yōji Ueda
A chef. The youngest member of the restaurant staff; he is a talented pasty chef.
Olga (オルガ, Oruga)
Voiced by: Haruhi Terada
Nicoletta's mother. A sought-after divorce lawyer in Rome. She left Nicoletta with her grandmother at a young age so that she could get re-married.
Gabriella (ガブリエッラ, Gaburierra)
Voiced by: Misa Watanabe
Claudio's ex-wife. A lawyer who works in the same office as Olga; they are best friends, and is the only person Olga tells that Nicoletta is her daughter.
Lorenzo Orsini (ロレンツォ, Rorentso)
Voiced by: Kenji Nomura
Olga's current husband and owner of Casetta dell'Orso. 51 years old.
Vanna (ヴァンナ)
Voiced by: Yōko Sōmi
A former chef of Casetta dell'Orso. She left to live in America with her family a few years previous to the start of the series. Teo looks up to her as a mentor.

== Anime ==
The Ristorante Paradiso anime adaptation aired on Fuji TV's late night Noise programming block from April 5, 2009. Produced by David Production, being the studio's first anime television series production, the series aired for 11 episodes. The anime has been licensed by Right Stuf Inc. and was released under their new label Lucky Penny on November 6, 2012.

=== Theme songs ===
Opening theme
"Marigold" (マリーゴールド, Marīgōrudo)
Lyrics: Tomoko Nagashima, composition and arrangement: Kazuma Fujimoto, performance: orange pekoe
Ending theme
"Suteki na Kajitsu" (ステキな果実; literally "Lovely Fruit")
Lyrics: Yuho Iwasato, composition: Lisa Komine, arrangement: Rie Hamada, performance: Lisa Komine
Theme song
"Palette" (パレット, Paretto) (episode 3 only)
Lyrics: Natsumi Kiyoura, composition: Shun Yoshida, arrangement: Ko-ko-ya, performance: Natsumi Kiyoura

=== Episodes ===
No.	Title	Directed by	Original release date
1	"Nicoletta"; Transliteration: "Nikoretta" (Japanese: ニコレッタ)	Nana Harada	April 8, 2009
Nicoletta arrives at the restaurant and threatens to expose her mother's secret. She is introduced to Claudio, the restaurant staff, and Olga's new husband, Lorenzo. Olga loans a furnished apartment to Nicoletta.
2	"Ring"; Transliteration: "Yubiwa" (Japanese: 指輪)	Shinichi Tōkairin	April 8, 2009
While searching for a job, Nicoletta runs into Luciano and his grandson. Something that the grandson says inspires her to ask Olga for a job at the restaurant. Claudio walks Nicoletta home through the rain, and she tells him that she has feelings for him. Later, Claudio's ex-wife comes to the restaurant for dinner, and Nicoletta interrupts a conversation between Claudio and his ex-wife. Nicoletta is left wondering why Claudio really wears his wedding ring.
3	"Paradiso"; Transliteration: "Paradeiuzo" (Japanese: パラディーゾ)	Tetsuya Watanabe	April 22, 2009
After a conversation with Luciano, Claudio begins to avoid Nicoletta. Nicoletta and Olga have a conversation about Nicoletta's feelings for Claudio, and she realizes that she is in love with him.
4	"Casetta dell'Orso"; Transliteration: "Kazetta Derroruso" (Japanese: カゼッタ・デッロルソ0)	Shigeru Kimiya	April 29, 2009
When an old sous-chef stops by for a dinner with the owner and his wife, Nicoletta has a chance to learn a bit of the history of the Casetta dell'Orso.
5	"The Flavour of Orsini"; Transliteration: "Orushiini no Aji" (Japanese: オルシーニの味)	Naokatsu Tsuda	May 6, 2009
The owner of the restaurant and Gigi (the sommelier) are half-brothers, and also cousins — the owner's father had an affair with his brother's wife. As a result of the affair, Gigi and the owner didn't meet until they were in their twenties, when they hit it off well, and decided their fathers' feud had nothing to do with them. Gigi observes people closely – it is how he is able to pick just the right wine for them – so he has figured out that Nicoletta is Olga's daughter.
6	"A Husband and Wife"; Transliteration: "Aru Fuufu" (Japanese: ある夫婦)	Shinichi Tōkairin	May 13, 2009
Vito (the tall, bald cameriere) is a lady's man who dearly loves his wife. Together with several of the other staff of Casetta dell'Orso, they set another young lady's man straight.
7	"A Special Day"; Transliteration: "Tokubetsu na Tsuitachi" (Japanese: 特別な一日)	Takeshi Yamaguchi	May 20, 2009
Luciano's grandson has a birthday coming up, and for Luciano, the staff of Casetta dell'Orso are willing to go all out.
8	"Days of Yore"; Transliteration: "Mukashi Nichi" (Japanese: 昔日)	Shigeru Kimiya	May 27, 2009
A glimpse into Claudio's past – back when he dropped dishes all the time and spilled wine on the blouses of rich ladies. Claudio's reminisces are used as a foil for Nicoletta's dish-dropping and general unhandiness around the kitchen. The occasion of these reflections is the arrival of Angela, the wife of Furio the head chef. Angela was the daughter of the hotel-owner where Claudio got his start – Furio was a chef there who showed Claudio some kindness. Angela arrives with the hotel manager who fired Claudio. The manager, who has retired, but is in town for a visit, does not recognize Claudio, and is terrifically impressed with Claudio, wondering where he learned such skills as a waiter.
9	"Day Off from the Ristorante"; Transliteration: "Ristorante no Kyuujitsu" (Japanese: リストランテの休日)	Tetsuo Ichimura	June 3, 2009
The heating is broken, so the restaurant is closed. It is not empty, though – the kitchen staff are trying out dishes for the spring menu, with Nicoletta trying to scrape together something palatable. Reflections on Teo's tumultuous past with Vanna. Again, foils for Nicoletta. Just as Teo is dismissive of Nicoletta's skills as a cook, Vanna was dismissive of Teo.
10	"Secret Love"; Transliteration: "Himetaru Koi" (Japanese: 秘めたる恋)	Toshiyuki Kato	June 10, 2009
A comparison between Luciano (who rejects the advances of a woman, because he has not forgotten his dead wife), and Claudio (who cannot let go of his love for his ex-wife). Mixed in: Gabriella, Claudio's ex, keeps coming to the restaurant. Nicoletta confronts her, telling her it is cruel to come so often, since she knows how Claudio feels.
11	"The People of the Ristorante"; Transliteration: "Ristorante no Hitobito" (Japanese: リストランテの人々)	Shinichi Tōkairin	June 17, 2009
The conclusion of the arc begun in episode 10. Luciano tells Claudio directly that it is time he removed his wedding ring. Olga's birthday. Nicoletta bakes her a cake. Olga is so moved, and moved by the events surrounding Claudio and his wife – who is Olga's business partner – that she confesses that Nicoletta is her daughter. Lorenzo tells her he has known since Nicoletta started work at the Casetta dell'Orso: Nicoletta and Olga have the same smile. The series ends with Nicoletta noticing that Claudio no longer wears his wedding ring.

== Reception ==
Anime News Network (ANN) had two editors review the first two episodes of the anime: Carlo Santos commended the "eye-catching backgrounds" and "stylish characters" for displaying a "tasteful choice of colors and couture" and the "jazz-tinged soundtrack", but was critical of the series being a mostly plotless affair with slow pacing and "superfluous scenes" involving Nicoletta and the elderly harem either conversing or eating, saying: "It's a thin line between laid-back restraint and flat-out boredom, and Ristorante Paradiso is continuing to straddle that line very precariously." Casey Brienza critiqued that the series' "carefully articulated European feel and unusual character designs" emit a josei manga style and its narrative make it "a refreshing change of pace from the oceans of otaku-type game and light novel adaptations." She concluded that: "Ristorante Paradiso is modest in all respects, including its ambition, but no other anime this season seeks to interpellate anything approaching the same audience demographic—and for this reason alone, it is a must-see."

Brienza reviewed the complete anime series and gave it a B+ grade. While critical of the "mediocre animation quality" and the "impressionistic, baggy narrative", she praised the slice-of-life story, the "Europhile atmosphere" throughout its Rome setting, the pleasing soundtrack and Fumiko Orikasa's performance as Nicoletta, concluding that: "Although it is perhaps a tad disappointing that an anime based upon a manga originally serialized in Manga Erotics F is not more, well, erotic, there is more than enough sensuality to please even the most discriminating of anime hedonists. Great Italian food and faithful love… what more could you ask for?" Fellow ANN editor Bamboo Dong praised the series for being "pleasantly drawn" with its character designs and the "idyllic world" its cast occupies to display the overall vibe, concluding that: "Overall, Ristorante Paradiso is exceedingly pleasant, and I wish it was longer. By the time it drifted to an end, I felt sad that I had to leave the characters, just as we were beginning to befriend them." Conversely, Rebecca Silverman gave praise to Ono's character designs making the transition from manga to anime and the "watercolor styled backgrounds" but was critical of the series' meandering pace, poor use of computer animation and the lack of development between Nicoletta and Olga.

Fellow ANN editor Rebecca Bundy published a positive review of the manga's first volume in 2010. She wrote that: "[W]ith its focus on a grown-up setting and cast, a harem of sophisticated men (a role that's normally reserved to a single member of the genre) who oftentimes have wives, ex's, or (grand)children, and being open about your feelings instead of causing drama, this is the perfect pick for anyone who's tired of reading about shy high school girls and their cutesy little crushes." Santos praised the "clear and expressive" romantic storytelling and Ono's linework for displaying "expresiveness and subtlety" but was critical of the two half-brother waiters subplot and the artwork being sparse at times, concluding that: "Certainly it has its flaws, but as a grown-up, complicated love story, this one really hits the spot."
