= House of Five Leaves =

Japanese manga series by Natsume Ono

- Cover of the first manga volume, featuring Yaichi (left) and Masanosuke (right)

さらい屋五葉 (Sarai-ya Goyō)
- Genre: Drama, martial arts
- Manga
- Written by: Natsume Ono
- Published by: Shogakukan
- English publisher: NA: Viz Media
- Imprint: Ikki Comix
- Magazine: Monthly Ikki
- Original run: November 25, 2005 – July 24, 2010
- Volumes: 8
- Anime television series
- Directed by: Tomomi Mochizuki
- Produced by: Makoto Kimura; Takashi Kōchiyama; Sachi Kawamoto
- Written by: Tomomi Mochizuki
- Music by: Kayo Konishi; Yukio Kondō
- Studio: Manglobe
- Licensed by: AUS: Siren Visual; NA: NIS America (expired), AnimEigo (current), RetroCrush (streaming only); UK: Beez Entertainment
- Original network: Fuji TV (Noitamina)
- Original run: April 15, 2010 – July 1, 2010
- Episodes: 12
- Manga

Kozure Dōshin
- Written by: Natsume Ono
- Published by: Shogakukan
- Imprint: Ikki Comix
- Magazine: Web Ikipara Comic
- Original run: January 4, 2013 – June 6, 2014
- Volumes: 1
- icon

House of Five Leaves (Japanese: さらい屋五葉, Hepburn: Sarai-ya Goyō) is a Japanese manga series written and illustrated by Natsume Ono. It was serialized in Shogakukan's seinen manga magazine Monthly Ikki from November 2005 to July 2010, with its chapters published in eight tankōbon volumes under the Ikki Comix imprint. It is licensed for distribution in North America by Viz Media.

The manga was adapted into a twelve-episode anime television series, produced by Manglobe, and written and directed by Tomomi Mochizuki, which aired on Fuji TV's Noitamina programming block from April to July 2010. Funimation streamed it online as part of an international deal with Fuji TV allowing them to simulcast series from the Noitamina block. NIS America licensed the series for a home video release in North America in 2012. The license expired with no plans for renewal in 2017. In 2022, RetroCrush began streaming the anime online with English subtitles.

House of Five Leaves also inspired a spin-off manga, Kozure Dōshin, serialized on the Web Ikipara Comic page of Shogakukan's Ikki Paradise website from January 2013 to June 2014. Its chapters were later published in a single tankōbon volume under the Ikki Comix imprint.

== Plot ==
Set during Japan's Edo period, House of Five Leaves follows Masanosuke Akitsu, a rōnin (wandering samurai) and a skilled swordsman, whose timid personality often causes him to be let go by his employers. One day, he encounters Yaichi, the charismatic leader of a group of bandits calling themselves the Five Leaves, and is offered a job as his bodyguard. Although he is worried about their intentions, Masanosuke is intrigued by the group and agrees to work with them.

== Characters ==
Masanosuke (Masa) Akitsu (秋津政之助, Akitsu Masanosuke)
Voiced by: Daisuke Namikawa
Masanosuke is a skilled samurai hailing from a prominent family. His father is deceased and his mother continues to live at their estate. He succeeded his father as head of household as he is the eldest son of his family, with a younger brother and sister. Although he was a loyal and highly skilled subject of his shōgun, he is a very timid person and becomes highly anxious around crowds, especially when they are observing him. Ultimately, his personality caused his shōgun to release him from his service. Masanosuke also resigned from his position as head of his household on the advice of his uncle when his shōgun expressed his desire to let him go. Feeling unwelcome in his hometown, he left and settled in Edo, the capital of Japan before its renaming. There, he sought work as a bodyguard, though there was little demand for such work, and due to his pride as a samurai he often refused work that he believed was below his station. He was eventually hired by Yaichi as a bodyguard of the Five Leaves to protect them during their exchanges of ransom money. Initially unaware of their illegal activities, once he became aware of them he was unsure if he should continue in their employment. He eventually decided to continue working for them as he was in need of money, both to live on and to send home. He is also curious about Yaichi and his past. Although he sometimes idolizes Yaichi's carefree behavior and philosophy, he is also aware that Yaichi harbors a dark past. Despite eventually learning of what Yaichi has done, Masanosuke still desires to stay by his side.
Aside from being timid, Masanosuke is also naive in nature. He is always earnest in his actions and is both poor at deceiving others and unsuspecting of deception in others. He has a habit of speaking his mind, oftentimes without thought or reading the atmosphere, which sometimes causes others to lecture him.
As the series progresses he is shown to become more mature and comfortable with himself. By the end of the series, he is able to set aside his pride to keep what he holds dear and is confident in his purpose.
Yaichi (Ichi) (弥一)
Voiced by: Takahiro Sakurai (adult); Keiko Nemoto (child)
The leader of the Five Leaves. A mysterious person, he dislikes talking about his own past and lives in a local brothel, protecting and flirting with the women working in there. Distinguishable by his light-colored hair and his tanned skin, he is often seen smoking a pipe. At the beginning of the series, he is calm and carefree, seemingly living life to the fullest and intent on living in only the present, something he expressed to Masanosuke. He initially hired Masanosuke to scare off other bodyguards during a ransom transaction, but let him join the Five Leaves because he found Masanosuke "interesting". Later on, he states that he finds the samurai "annoying", and begins to avoid Masanosuke. Due to his mysterious but carefree personality, Masanosuke has become interested in learning about his past, something which discomforts him. After his former gang comes after him, Yaichi attempts to disband the Five Leaves and becomes reclusive.
It is revealed through flashbacks that Yaichi was actually born as Seinoshin (誠之進), a young child who was adopted into a prominent Japanese family but was rejected by his foster mother. As a result, he became quiet and withdrawn, with his only friends being a family servant named Yaichi and the heir of a neighboring family named Yagi. He was kidnapped by a bandit named Jin on the direction of his foster mother, who had recently given birth to a son. The bandits were to kill him, but Jin instead told Seinoshin what was going on and let him decide whether to return to the estate and face death or to simply run away. Seinoshin initially refused to believe any of it and was certain that his servant Yaichi would protect him. Jin lied and told him that the servant facilitated the kidnapping on orders from the mother, which traumatized Seinoshin. He eventually decided not to return to the estate and instead joined the bandits under the moniker of "Sei the Drifter". Before the events of the story, he sold out the other bandits in an unexplained event, which later lead them to come after him.
In the anime, he is said to have become a merciless killer who, for reasons unknown, betrayed his old gang by selling them out. He then fled to Edo where he became known as "Ichi", forming the Five Leaves gang with a woman named Otake whom he paid out of bondage from a brothel. When his past catches up to him, he stumbles into a graveyard and mourns at his servant's tombstone until daylight, when Masanosuke arrives and comforts him.
Matsukichi (Matsu) (松吉)
Voiced by: Yūya Uchida
Once a lone thief, he is now a member of Five Leaves as a spy, gathering information about their targets. He creates metal hair ornaments for women as a business to generate money outside of the Five Leaves gang. Calm and collected, Matsukichi usually does his job, but once he has a goal he doesn't stop until he achieves it, making others think he is reckless. He reveals to Masanosuke that he works for the Five Leaves because he is indebted to Yaichi, who saved him from a group of pursuers who caught him trying to steal money. At one point, he stole money in order to support his wife and son, whom he never knew he had, when the son was injured. During a break-in, he was injured and discovered by the master of the estate, who offered to listen to his reason for stealing.
Umezō (Ume) (梅造)
Voiced by: Masaya Takatsuka
Owner of a tavern where the members of Five Leaves meet and discuss their plans. Umezō was a former criminal and member of a notorious gang of robbers, but he wanted to leave. Fortunately, the gang leader was kind enough to let him go, but it was mostly because his skills were not needed and his departure wouldn't affect the success of their activities. Afterward, Umezō got married and had a daughter named Okinu through his wife, who later died from an illness. He is quite overprotective of Okinu, holding grudges against anyone who makes her cry, and his gruff manner seems unfriendly to those who first meet him. At first, he is not accepting of Masanosuke because of his timidity and "soft heart", but he gradually warms up to him. Umezō initially joined the Five Leaves to get revenge on a man who had been harassing Okinu, but continued in order to help another man pay bribe money.
Otake (おたけ)
Voiced by: Fuyuka Oura
Otake is the local geisha of the Five Leaves. She is revealed as having worked in a brothel until Yaichi paid her way out of bondage. Out of gratitude, she then began working together with Yaichi and formed the Five Leaves, which she also named. Cool-headed and sultry, she is among the first of the Five Leaves gang to accept Masanosuke upon his arrival. She later moves into Masanosuke's old apartment – accompanied by a cat that used to visit Masanosuke frequently – because she wanted a place of her own to live in.

== Media ==
=== Manga ===
Written and illustrated by Natsume Ono, House of Five Leaves was serialized in Shogakukan's seinen manga magazine Monthly Ikki from November 25, 2005, to July 24, 2010. The individual chapters were collected and published in eight tankōbon volumes under Shogakukan's Ikki Comix imprint from July 28, 2006, to September 30, 2010.

The manga is licensed for distribution in North America by Viz Media. It was first released in a digital, English-language version of Ikki magazine, and later published in eight print volumes under the Viz Signature (or SigIkki) imprint from September 21, 2010, to September 18, 2012. The series is also licensed in Taiwan by Taiwan Tohan Co. and in France by Kana.

==== Volumes ====
No.	Original release date	Original ISBN	English release date	English ISBN
1	July 28, 2006	978-4-09-188326-1	September 21, 2010	978-1-4215-3210-3
2	February 28, 2007	978-4-09-188352-0	December 21, 2010	978-1-4215-3211-0
3	August 30, 2007	978-4-09-188370-4	April 19, 2011	978-1-4215-3212-7
4	April 26, 2008	978-4-09-188415-2	September 20, 2011	978-1-4215-3213-4
5	November 28, 2008	978-4-09-188428-2	December 20, 2011	978-1-4215-3214-1
6	April 30, 2009	978-4-09-188464-0	March 20, 2012	978-1-4215-3542-5
7	February 25, 2010	978-4-09-188499-2; 978-4-09-159072-5 (SE)	June 19, 2012	978-1-4215-4201-0
8	September 30, 2010	978-4-09-188529-6	September 18, 2012	978-1-4215-4202-7

==== Spin-off ====
A spin-off manga, Kozure Dōshin (子連れ同心; "The Constable Who Brought His Child Along"), was serialized on the Web Ikipara Comic page of Shogakukan's Ikki Paradise website from January 4, 2013, to June 6, 2014. A single tankōbon volume was published under Shogakukan's Ikki Comix imprint on March 6, 2015. The manga depicts the childhood of Tachibana, a supporting character in House of Five Leaves.

=== Anime ===
The anime adaptation of House of Five Leaves was produced by Manglobe and written and directed by Tomomi Mochizuki. The show's musical soundtrack was composed by Kayo Konishi and Yukio Kondō, while the opening theme song "Sign of Love" was performed by immi, and the ending theme song "All I Need Is..." was performed by Rake. The series aired on Fuji TV's Noitamina programming block in Japan from April 15 to July 1, 2010, for a total of twelve episodes. On April 16, 2010, Noitamina producer Kōji Yamamoto apologized to the anime's staff via his Twitter account for the first episode's low television rating of 1.5% – a third of what many series in the Noitamina block earn. The anime was distributed on six DVD sets in Japan by Media Factory, with the first DVD set released on July 23, 2010, and the last DVD set released on December 22, 2010.

House of Five Leaves was licensed for streaming in North America by Funimation as a part of a deal with Fuji TV allowing them to simulcast series from the Noitamina block. The episodes premiered on Funimation's website one hour after the initial Japanese broadcast. They were later uploaded to Hulu and YouTube. NIS America licensed the series for a home video release in North America, with a premium DVD set released on March 6, 2012, and a standard DVD set released on March 12, 2013. The license expired with no plans for renewal in 2017. The anime was also licensed for a home video release in the United Kingdom by Beez Entertainment and in Australia and New Zealand by Siren Visual. In 2022, Digital Media Rights' RetroCrush service began streaming the anime online with English subtitles. In 2026, it was announced that AnimEigo will release the series on Blu-ray in 2027.

==== Episodes ====
No.	Title	Directed by	Original release date
1	"In Name Only" (Japanese: 形ばかりの)	Tomomi Mochizuki	April 15, 2010
Poor, masterless samurai Masanosuke Akitsu (Masa) encounters Yaichi (Ichi), who offers the timid swordsman a bodyguard job. Masa is shocked to discover that the job is a hostage exchange for a ransom and refuses to do any more work for Ichi. However, he is intrigued by Ichi's carefree attitude.
2	"Make Love to Me" (Japanese: 抱かれたい)	Jun Soga	April 22, 2010
With few other options, Masa stays at Ichi's friend Ume's inn and learns that Ichi lives at the Katsuraya brothel in the red-light district, ostensibly as its bodyguard. Masa tries his hand at manual labor but is hopeless and Otake tries to convince him to join their band, the Five Leaves. Ume presses Masa to help him with the "shopping", but Masa later finds out that shopping involves the return of a hostage for ransom through their agent, Souji. Masa begins to grow more comfortable within the world of the Five Leaves, and slowly becomes integrated into the gang.
3	"Gradually Get Him Involved" (Japanese: 徐々に巻き込んで)	Kōsuke Kobayashi	April 29, 2010
Yaichi arranges for Masa to be hired as a bodyguard for Oumiya, a wholesale rice merchant, and the samurai hopes the position will be permanent. While there, Masa befriends Yuutarou the young son of a maid, but it appears that his real father is Oumiya. Later, Ichi reveals that Oumiya is their next kidnapping target. Meanwhile, Masa again encounters Heizaemon Yage who offers him a job. Ichi changes his plans and Matsu kidnaps Oumiya's son Yuutarou instead. With Yuutarou stored at Souji's house, Ichi recalls the time when he was kidnapped by bandits to be killed, allegedly arranged by his friend the servant Yaichi, but the kidnappers decided instead to fake his death and invites him to join their gang.
4	"Sure Does Get Carried Away" (Japanese: 加減がねぇ)	Kotomi Deai	May 6, 2010
Surprisingly, Ichi goesout of his way to protect a thief on the run from the authorities. Ichi arranges for Masa to be hired as a bodyguard at the Katsuraya brothel where Ichi spends most of his time. Masa tries to find out more about Ichi without success, although he does learn that each of the members of the Five Leaves owe him a debt for helping them in the past. Meanwhile, Masa slowly become weak from a mysterious illness called Edo sickness, thought to be caused by the change in diet. A flashback shows the formation of the Five Leaves initially to help Ume rescue his daughter Okinu from a family which treated her badly.
5	"It'll Be Fine" (Japanese: 上手くいくさ)	Yuichiro Yano	May 13, 2010
While Masa is recuperating from his illness at Souji's house, Ume tells how Souji helped him escape from his life in a criminal gang in Chuugoku. As Ume leaves, he passes a former gang member Senkichi who asks Souji for money. He needs it to pay off Denshichi, a former gang leader who is pressuring Senkichi to join his new gang. Souji turns Senkichi away but Ume gives him some money.
6	"Consider Yourself Fortunate" (Japanese: 幸せと思えよ)	Yoshihiro Oka	May 20, 2010
Senkichi gives the money to Denshichi to repay his debt, but Denshichi maintains that a debt is still owed and Senkichi's lock-picking skills are required by Sengorou of Yatsua. Souji's old friend Toku visits him and mentions that Sengorou is coming to Edo and to be on guard. Souji and others suggest that Masa should return to his home to cure the Edo sickness, but he insists on staying near Edo. Denshichi presses Senkichi for the source of his money and he says that it came from Souji. Denshichi confronts Souji demanding more money, but Souji is defended by Masa long enough for Senkichi to creep up behind Denshichi and kill him. Ichi travels to Souji's house to check on Masa and Souji recognizes him from the past.
7	"Thoughtless of Me" (Japanese: 野暮でござった)	Masato Jinbo	May 27, 2010
Souji's recognizes Ichi from the past as a former member of his gang. He warns Ichi that remnants of the Bakuro gang may be returning to Edo. Masa has recovered from his illness after spending a month with Souji and he returns to Edo with Ichi who realizes that Ume intentionally sent him to see Souji. Masa clumsily bumps into the same ronin he bumped into before and the ronin challenges Masa to a duel. They agree to use wooden swords, but Masa loses his nerve and runs away. He encounters Yagi who offers to train him, but first they visit the graves of people Yagi knew, including that of a man called Yaichi. Meanwhile, Matsu visits the merchant Kikuya who once saved his life and offers him money.
8	"Deeply Indebted to Two People" (Japanese: 恩人が二人いる)	Ryuichi Kimura	June 3, 2010
Ume decides to quit Five Leaves and Matsu decides to stop visiting Ume's tavern. While Matsu is with metal smith Kikuya, an employee mentions that the wooden tickets from his clients allowing access to their premises, have been stolen from him. Kikuya suspects the culprit is his competitor Ootsuya who visited while he was away. Matsu enters Ootsuya's premises at night to investigate but is caught and held prisoner. Matsu's disappearance is noticed by Masa and Ume who go looking for him. They trace him to Kikuya who explains how some time ago he paid the medical expenses for Matsu's child, and that he told Matsu about the missing tags and his suspicions about Ootsuya . Masa then gets work as a bodyguard for Ootsuya in an effort to free Matsu.
9	"Come to Rescue You" (Japanese: お助けに参る)	Jun Soga	June 10, 2010
Masa frees rescues Matsu and carries him to Ume's tavern while the police investigate an apparent burglary at Ootsuya's. Yagi is one of the investigating officers and he retrieves the tags. He returns them to Masa, however Ichi warns him to stay away from Yagi. Meanwhile, Masa's younger sister, Sachi, runs away from home to avoid an arranged marriage and joins Masa in Edo. He tries to send her back home but she refuses.
10	"A Dirty Stray Cat" (Japanese: 汚い野良猫)	Kōsuke Kobayashi	June 17, 2010
Otake warns Masa not to inquire too much into Ichi's background. Yagi invites Masa to spar with him, and tells Masa about his youth and friendship with the servant Yaichi at the Saegusa household next door. He remarks on Ichi's similarity to Yaichi who later died. Meanwhile, Ichi's melancholy behavior is becoming a concern for people at Katsuraya. Souji learns from his friend Toku that a former member of the Bakuro gang is hunting Seinoshin for selling out the gang. Yagi becomes convinced that Ichi is Seinoshin.
11	"Pardon Me" (Japanese: 失礼つかまつった)	Kotomi Deai	June 24, 2010
Five Leaves kidnaps the heir of Kanou house, but the head of the house only agrees to pay half of the ransom. The messenger requests that the hostage be killed in secret because he is not of his father's blood. The youth cannot believe this, but Ichi instructs that the hostage be released now that he knows the truth about his paternity. Ichi's actions suggests to Masa that Ichi himself had been kidnapped some time ago. Souji's old acquaintance, Jin, arrives for a few days and is looking for Seinoshin. Later that night, Jin catches up with Ichi and asserts that he is Seinoshin of Bakuro, but Masa intervenes and he leaves. Later, Masa confides in Ichi that he handed over his position to his younger brother while he tried to deal with his "weakness" and has since found a place which suits him in Five Leaves. Masa then questions Souji about Ichi and the old man tells a story of years earlier when he ordered Ichi to kill one of his men who had offended another gang.
12	"Already Wasted" (Japanese: もうふらふらですよ)	Tomomi Mochizuki	July 1, 2010
Yagi catches up with Ichi who had been drinking heavily, and invites him to have a drink while he reflects on the past. Yagi relates to Ichi the story of the Saegusa family who adopted a boy named Seinoshin who was cared for by a servant named Yaichi. After a son was born, both Seinoshin and Yaichi died in suspicious circumstances. Yagi suggests that the family arranged for Seinoshin to be kidnapped and Yaichi was thrown down a well to silence him. Ichi staggers home, recalling the time when he was kidnapped on his family's instructions. As Ichi stops on a bridge, Jin catches up with him and accuses him of killing one of the old gang members. Jin states that it was not Yaichi who organized Seinoshin's kidnapping. They draw their knives and attack each other, but Ichi manages to kill Jin. Later, Ichi visits Yaichi's grave to atone for blaming him for his kidnapping many years ago. He is still there when Masa finds him the next morning. The Five Leaves detect a change in Ichi, and Masa is more convinced that Ichi needs his protection.

== Reception ==
The American Library Association's YALSA division included House of Five Leaves on its list of Great Graphic Novels for Teens in 2011.
