= Futagashira =

Japanese manga series

- First volume cover

ふたがしら
- Genre: Historical, slice of life
- Manga
- Written by: Natsume Ono
- Published by: Shogakukan
- Imprint: Ikki Comix
- Magazine: Monthly Ikki (2011–2014); Hibana (2015–2016)
- Original run: May 25, 2011 – August 6, 2016
- Volumes: 7
- Television drama
- Directed by: Yū Irie
- Written by: Kazuki Nakashima
- Original network: Wowow
- Original run: June 13, 2015 – October 15, 2016
- Episodes: 10
- icon

Futagashira (ふたがしら; lit. "Two at the Top") is a Japanese manga series written and illustrated by Natsume Ono. It was published in Shogakukan's seinen manga magazine Monthly Ikki from May 2011 to September 2014, when the magazine ceased publication. It was then serialization in Hibana from March 2015 to September 2016. Its chapters were published by Shogakukan in seven tankōbon volumes.

A five-episode television drama adaptation was broadcast from June to July 2015. A five-episode second season was broadcast from September to October 2016.

== Characters ==
- Benzō (Ken'ichi Matsuyama)
- Sōji (Taichi Saotome)
- Okon (Nanao)

== Media ==
=== Manga ===
Written and illustrated by Natsume Ono, Futagashira started in Shogakukan's seinen manga magazine Monthly Ikki on May 25, 2011. Monthly Ikki ceased publication on September 25, 2014, and the series was transferred to the then new brand magazine Hibana, starting on March 6, 2015. The manga finished on August 6, 2016. Shogakukan compiled its chapters into seven tankōbon volumes, released from December 27, 2011, to September 12, 2016.

==== Volumes ====
No.	Release date	ISBN
1	December 27, 2011	978-4-09-188568-5
2	August 30, 2012	978-4-09-188597-5
3	July 30, 2013	978-4-09-188628-6
4	February 28, 2014	978-4-09-188648-4
5	March 6, 2015	978-4-09-188681-1
6	January 12, 2016	978-4-09-188686-6
7	September 12, 2016	978-4-09-188686-6

=== Drama ===
A 5-episode Japanese television drama adaptation was broadcast on Wowow from June 13 to July 11, 2015. A 5-episode second season was broadcast from September 11 to October 15, 2016. The soundtrack was composed and performed by Japanese "Death Jazz" band Soil & "Pimp" Sessions.
