= Natsume Ono =

Japanese manga artist

Natsume Ono オノ ナツメ
- Born: 9 July 1977 (age 49)
- Pseudonym: basso
- Notable works: Not Simple; Ristorante Paradiso; House of Five Leaves; ACCA: 13-Territory Inspection Dept.

Natsume Ono (オノ ナツメ, Ono Natsume; born 9 July 1977) is a Japanese manga artist. In addition to her mainstream manga work, Ono publishes boys' love (male-male romance) comics under the pen name basso.

== Career ==
Ono began creating dōjinshi (self-published manga) after graduating from high school. In 2001, she completed a ten-month study abroad program in Italy, studying the Italian language. In 2003, upon her return to Japan, she began to create the webcomic series La Quinta Camera. It was subsequently serialised in the magazine Comic Seed! and later published as a single tankōbon volume by Shogakukan under their Ikki Comix imprint.

Many of Ono's works have been published in English by Viz Media since 2010, including La Quinta Camera, Not Simple, House of Five Leaves, Ristorante Paradiso, the prequel series Gente: The People of Ristorante Paradiso, and the short story collection Tesoro. Several titles have also been published in English by Yen Press, such as ACCA: 13-Territory Inspection Dept. and the spin-off series ACCA: 13-Territory Inspection Dept. P.S., and by Kodansha USA, which licensed Ono's short story collection Danza.

== Style ==
Ono is distinguished by her loose, minimalist drawing style, and for the characteristic wide mouths of her figures. She typically writes slice of life stories focused on interpersonal relationships, with travel used as a frequent plot and thematic device.

== Works ==
=== As Natsume Ono ===
- La Quinta Camera (serialized in Comic Seed!, 2003–2004)
- Not Simple (serialized in Comic Seed!, 2004–2005)
- House of Five Leaves (serialized in Monthly Ikki, 2005–2010)
- Ristorante Paradiso (serialized in Manga Erotics F, 2005–2006)
- Danza (short story collection; published by Kodansha, 2007)
- Tesoro (short story collection; published by Shogakukan, 2008)
- Gente: The People of Ristorante Paradiso (serialized in Manga Erotics F, 2006–2009)
- Coppers (serialized in Monthly Morning Two, 2008–2009)
- Nigeru Otoko (逃げる男; serialized in Manga Erotics F, 2010–2011)
- Tsura Tsura Waraji (serialized in Monthly Morning Two, 2009–2012)
- Futagashira (serialized in Monthly Ikki and Hibana, 2011–2016)
- Kozure Dōshin (serialized on the website Ikki Paradise, 2013–2014)
- ACCA: 13-Territory Inspection Dept. (serialized in Monthly Big Gangan, 2013–2016)
- Lady & Oldman (serialized in Ultra Jump, 2015–2019)
- ACCA: 13-Territory Inspection Dept. P.S. (serialized in Monthly Big Gangan, 2016–2017)
- Have a Great Sunday (serialized in Monthly Morning Two, 2017–2020)
- Badon (serialized in Monthly Big Gangan, 2019–present)
- Bokura ga Koi wo Shita no wa (serialized in Kiss, 2021–present)
- The Gamesters (serialized in Monthly Morning Two, 2022–present)

=== As basso ===
- Orso E Intellettuale (serialized in Edge, 2004; Opera, 2005–2010), consisting of:
  - Orso E Intellettuale (2004)
  - Amato Amaro (2005)
  - Gad Sfortunato (2007–2009)
  - Al to Neri to Sono Shuuhen (2008–2010)
- Kuma to Interi (serialized in Opera, 2005)
- Naka-san no Nagare (serialized in Opera, 2007–2011)
