= Not Simple =

Japanese manga series by Natsume Ono

- Cover of the reissued book volume
- Genre: Drama; Mystery; Slice of life
- Manga
- Written by: Natsume Ono
- Published by: Penguin Shobo (original); Shogakukan (reissue)
- English publisher: NA: Viz Media
- Imprint: Seed! Comics (original); Ikki Comix (reissue)
- Magazine: Comic Seed!
- Original run: August 20, 2004 – October 20, 2005
- Volumes: 1

Not Simple (stylized in all lowercase) is a Japanese manga series written and illustrated by Natsume Ono, presenting a nonlinear narrative of a young man's fractured family history and the search for his missing sister. It was serialized in Penguin Shobo's free web manga magazine Comic Seed! from August 2004 to October 2005. Its chapters were collected in a single compiled volume, first by Penguin Shobo in February 2005, and later by Shogakukan in October 2006. Viz Media licensed Not Simple for an English-language release in North America in January 2010.

== Plot ==
The book opens on an unspecified time with freelance journalist Jim remarking on the extraordinary life Ian leads, and his intention to turn Ian's story into a novel.

The prologue is the last chapter chronologically. A homeless Ian, weary and with very little reason left to live, is picked up by a stranger. The woman, Irene, soon realizes that Ian is the same man her Aunt Jenny talked with years prior (according to Irene's mother, a now-deceased Jenny was about to abandon her husband and infant child but was ultimately talked out of it by Ian). She informs him of Jenny's death and he becomes despondent. The two then travel to a train station, where Irene calls her mother and learns that it was not Jenny whom Ian met, but instead her own parent. However, Irene's stepdad (who is stated to be jealous and obsessive in controlling his daughter) mistakes Ian for her boyfriend and orders him to be killed. Jim – who was waiting at the station for Ian – and Irene are shocked to see him bleeding to death from a stab wound. Although Irene tries to save Ian, Jim stops her from touching his blood and says that he has already accepted death.

Sometime later, two restaurant patrons discuss a recently published book called Not Simple. Rumor has it that the novel is actually a thinly veiled memoir and the author, Jim, has committed suicide, mirroring the events of the book.

The novel then jumps back to the past, opening with Ian's sister Kylie being released from prison. She has a discussion with her father, who reveals that he divorced her mother while she was in jail and is now planning to remarry. Kylie's mother took Ian with her to London illegally, as she is not his biological mother and is an alcoholic. In London, Ian does odd jobs for the local butcher to support his mother, who uses the money immediately on alcohol. She eventually signs him over to a pimp, who gives Ian gum for behaving well. Kylie arrives and sends Ian back to his father in Melbourne, promising to meet him again when he achieves his goal of beating fictional runner Robert Johnston's 1000 meter record. Kylie returns to her mother's apartment and tells her she intends to make amends for the hurt she has caused her in the past.

Once again, an unknown amount of time has passed. Jim, who has only met Ian recently via interviews, discusses his incoming move to New York City. After hearing that Kylie has gone to America and left behind no other clues, Ian decides to join Jim on his move.

Months later, Jim is in an ambiguous relationship with his neighbor, Rick. Ian shows up at Jim's apartment one day wearing a three-piece suit that Irene's mother bought him, ostensibly after traveling all the way to the west coast. After Rick offers Ian a piece of gum, he confesses about his mother selling him into prostitution, seemingly unfazed. Soon enough, Jim gets a call informing him that Kylie is now in a prison on the outskirts of London for attempting to kill her boyfriend. Ian leaves once again in search of his sister.

Two years later, Jim spots Ian on the streets of New York. Disheveled and seemingly depressed, Ian is now a shell of the bright and hopeful man he once was. He confides in Jim that his sister was dead by the time he got to London: she caught a cold in prison which turned into a fatal case of pneumonia. Ian then went to visit his mother, who finally reveals to him that he is a product of incest between Kylie and their shared father. She determines him as the cause of her unhappiness and wishes to never see him again.

Ian decides to see Kylie's boyfriend, who is currently staying in New York. Later, Jim sees a distraught Ian holding pieces of gum outside of his room. Jim rushes to the man's apartment, where we learn that he is the former pimp who Ian met earlier in his lifetime. It is here that the reader learns that Ian is HIV positive, and seemingly has been since his childhood molestation; Kylie tried to kill her boyfriend after learning of his relationship with her child. Ian tells Jim that all he wants is to feel the love of those who should be close to him. He now only has one thing in his life to look forward to: his reunion with Irene's mother. Jim agrees to meet the both of them at the train station, unaware of the events that will take place later in the day.

The epilogue details Ian's heartfelt encounter with Irene's mother. After convincing her to go back to her family, Ian makes a promise with her to meet again in three years' time. The two spend the rest of the night sitting together on the beach.

A final page shows a scruffy-looking Jim standing on the side of a road, suggesting that he is now traveling much like Ian did before his death.

== Characters ==
Ian (イアン)
The protagonist. He spends the majority of the book searching for his sister, Kylie. Ian is described as having an "odd" personality and attracting people towards him.
Jim (ジム, Jimu)
A freelance journalist who stands idly by and observes Ian on his travels. He is homosexual and, as a result of this, distant from his family.
Kylie (カイリ, Kairi)
Ian's sister and biological mother. At the beginning of the book, she is serving a prison sentence for armed robbery.
Irene (アイリーン, Airīn)
Ian's half-sister. She is unwillingly the cause of his death at the beginning of the novel.
Irene's mother (アイリーンの母親, Airīn no hahaoya)
The woman whom Ian's father remarried following his divorce. When backpacking across the country, Ian is the one who convinces her to stay and raise Irene. Neither are aware of the other's true identity.
Rick (リック, Rikku)
Jim's neighbor and potential lover. He ran away from home years ago instead of confronting his parents about his homosexuality.
Ian's father (イアンの父親, Ian no chichioya)
A cold and callous man. He takes care of Ian for a little while but shows no concern when he leaves with Jim.
Ian's "mother" (イアンの母親, Ian no hahaoya)
A depressed alcoholic who blames Ian for her unhappiness. Her sister is one of the few who takes care of her.

== Publication ==
Not Simple was written and illustrated by Natsume Ono. It was serialized in Penguin Shobo's free web manga magazine Comic Seed!, beginning in the September 2004 issue, released on August 20, 2004. It ended in the magazine's November 2005 issue, released on October 20, 2005. Penguin Shobo published a compiled volume labeled "Not Simple 1" under the Seed! Comics imprint on February 25, 2005. Later that year, the company declared bankruptcy, and Ono considered self-publishing a second volume with the series' remaining chapters. Instead, Shogakukan issued a new edition of Not Simple under the Ikki Comix imprint on October 30, 2006, collecting all 14 chapters, including the prologue and epilogue. Viz Media licensed the manga for an English-language release in North America. They initially uploaded a preview of Not Simple on their SigIkki website, and later published the complete volume under the Viz Signature imprint on January 19, 2010.

No.	Original release date	Original ISBN	English release date	English ISBN
1	February 25, 2005 (Penguin); October 30, 2006 (Shogakukan)	4-901978-49-7 (Penguin); 4-09-188344-3 (Shogakukan)	January 19, 2010	978-1-4215-3220-2

== Reception ==
The American Library Association's YALSA division included Not Simple on its list of Great Graphic Novels for Teens in 2011. Viz Media chose the manga to participate in the first Bay Area Book Festival in Berkeley, California, in 2015.
