= ACCA: 13-Territory Inspection Dept. =

Japanese manga series

- Cover of the first volume featuring Jean Otus

ACCA 13区監察課 (Akka: Jusan-ku Kansatsu-ka)
- Genre: Drama
- Manga
- Written by: Natsume Ono
- Published by: Square Enix
- English publisher: NA: Yen Press
- Magazine: Monthly Big Gangan
- Original run: June 25, 2013 – October 25, 2016
- Volumes: 6
- Manga

ACCA: 13-Territory Inspection Dept. P.S.
- Written by: Natsume Ono
- Published by: Square Enix
- English publisher: NA: Yen Press
- Magazine: Monthly Big Gangan
- Original run: December 24, 2016 – October 25, 2017
- Volumes: 2
- Anime television series
- Directed by: Shingo Natsume
- Produced by: Ayumi Serada; Risa Endō; Mai Kawashima; Kiwa Watanabe; Tomoyuki Ōwada; Ayuri Taguchi; Masato Yukita; Haruka Kakuya; Toshiyasu Hayashi; Seki Shota
- Written by: Tomohiro Suzuki
- Music by: Ryō Takahashi
- Studio: Madhouse
- Licensed by: Crunchyroll
- Original network: Tokyo MX, Sun TV, KBS, TSC, BS11
- English network: SEA: Aniplus Asia
- Original run: January 10, 2017 – March 28, 2017
- Episodes: 12
- Original video animation

ACCA: 13-Territory Inspection Dept. - Regards
- Directed by: Shingo Natsume; Keiichirō Saitō
- Produced by: Ayumi Serada
- Written by: Tomohiro Suzuki
- Music by: Ryō Takahashi
- Studio: Madhouse
- Licensed by: Crunchyroll
- Released: February 14, 2020
- Runtime: 47 minutes
- icon

ACCA: 13-Territory Inspection Dept. (Japanese: ACCA 13区監察課, Hepburn: Akka: Jusan-ku Kansatsu-ka) is a Japanese manga series written and illustrated by Natsume Ono. It was serialized in Square Enix's Monthly Big Gangan magazine from June 2013 to October 2016 and has been compiled in six tankōbon volumes as of December 2016. An anime television series adaptation by Madhouse aired between January 10, 2017, and March 28, 2017.

== Story ==
The Kingdom of Dowa is subdivided into 13 states, each of which has its own autonomy. These 13 states have many agencies that are controlled by the giant civilian organization known as ACCA. Jean Otus is the second-in-command of the ACCA inspection agency and handles audits of the various regions. The auditors keep track of all the activities of ACCA across the kingdom and keep data on each state's ACCA office flowing toward the central office. One of Jean's jobs is taking business trips from the capital to the other districts to check on the situation and personnel there.

== Media ==
=== Manga ===
Ono began serializing her manga series in the July 2013 issue of the Monthly Big Gangan magazine published by Square Enix on June 25, 2013, ending its serialization on October 25, 2016, in the eleventh 2016 issue of the magazine. As of December 24, 2016, the series has been published in six tankōbon volumes, with the first volume releasing on November 25, 2013, and the sixth and final volume releasing on December 24, 2016. Yen Press announced during their Sakura-Con 2017 panel that they have licensed the manga.

On December 24, 2016, Ono launched a spin-off manga titled ACCA 13-Ku Kansatsu-Ka P.S. that was serialized in the Monthly Big Gangan manga magazine from December 24, 2016, to October 25, 2017. Yen Press has also licensed the spin-off.

No.	Original release date	Original ISBN	English release date	English ISBN
1	November 25, 2013	978-4-75-754149-8	November 28, 2017	978-0-31-641276-6
2	July 25, 2014	978-4-75-754370-6	March 20, 2018	978-0-31-641596-5
3	January 24, 2015	978-4-75-754544-1	May 22, 2018	978-0-31-644667-9
4	September 25, 2015	978-4-75-754745-2	August 21, 2018	978-0-31-644678-5
5	May 25, 2016	978-4-75-754994-4	November 13, 2018	978-0316446822
6	December 24, 2016	978-4-75-755201-2	February 26, 2019	978-1975382773

=== Anime ===
An anime television series adaptation of the manga was announced in May 2016. The anime was produced by Madhouse and directed by Shingo Natsume, with Tomohiro Suzuki handling series composition, Norifumi Kugai designing the characters, and Ryō Takahashi composing the series' soundtrack. The series premiered on January 10, 2017, at 23:00 JST on Tokyo MX and later premiered on Sun TV, KBS Kyoto, TV Setouchi, and BS11. It was released across three home video release volumes containing four episodes each, totaling twelve episodes. Crunchyroll has licensed the series in North America.

The opening theme is "Shadow and Truth," performed by ONE III NOTES, while the ending theme is "Pērumūn ga Yureteru" (ペールムーンがゆれてる; lit. 'The Pale Moon Sways'), performed by Aira Yuhki.

Acca-kun's ACCA Course (アッカァくんのACCA講座, Acca-kun no ACCA Kōza), an original net animation animated by W-Toon Studio, began its release on the official anime's Twitter account in November 2016. It features an anime-original super-deformedmascot character named Acca-kun (アッカァくん), voiced by Ayumu Murase.

An original video animation titled ACCA: 13-Territory Inspection Dept. Regards (ACCA13区監察課 Regards, ACCA 13-Ku Kansatsu-Ka Regards) was announced on March 26, 2019 and premiered on February 14, 2020, with returning staff and cast.

No.	Title (Note: All English titles taken from Crunchyroll.)	Directed by	Original release date
1	"Jean the Cigarette-Peddler" "Morai Tabako no Jīn" (Japanese: もらいタバコのジーン)	Shingo Natsume	January 10, 2017
Jean Otus reports to ACCA Headquarters, where the staff learns that the Inspection Department is to be terminated by the Five Chief Officers. It was created during times of instability almost 100 years ago, as it is no longer required. At the agricultural Famasu District, Jean meets Eider, Branch Supervisor, and examines the records. He finds discrepancies that indicate staff have falsified data and been involved in the black market for cigarettes. Cigarettes are an expensive item, and Jean's continuous smoking of them in public draws some criticism and jealousy from an ACCA rookie. Chief Officer Grossular cancels the Inspection Department termination and has Jean put under observation. Jean carries out a spot audit of the Bādon Branch but finds that ACCA Director-General Mauve is doing the same. Meanwhile, people start remarking on the increasing number of fires that have been occurring. Rail picks up a cigarette lighter left in a cafe by Jean. Back at ACCA headquarters, Chief Officer Grossular receives news of a suspected coup d'état.
2	"The Partner in Crime's Name is Nino" "Akuyū (Tomo) no Na wa Nīno" (Japanese: 悪友（とも）の名はニーノ)	Shin Wakabayashi	January 17, 2017
Grossular questions Mauve about the rumored coup d'état because the nation is at peace. Jean watches as schoolchildren learn about the history and function of ACCA. A fire is announced in the north sector, and Rail considers it a missed opportunity to frame Jean for the fire using his abandoned cigarette lighter. After a robbery at a cigarette store, Rail corners the young thief but lets him go, keeping the bag of stolen cigarettes. Jean finds and confronts Rail about his questionable activities in confiscating stolen goods and the stolen lighter; however, as Rail is not under his jurisdiction, Jean leaves him with just a warning. At a Chief Officers meeting, Grossular says the suspected coup d'état is more than a rumor and believes Jean Otus is involved. Later, he assigns agent Crow to his surveillance. On an inspection trip to the Jumōku District, Jean meets Branch Supervisor Koruri and helps their branch with a computer malfunction. That night, Jean meets his old friend Nino, who tells Jean that he is no longer being watched; however, he is in fact the agent Crow assigned to watch Jean. When Jean encounters Mauve in a shop, she asks if he is free to meet in the evening on the weekend.
3	"The Swirling Smoke of Rumors in the Castle" "Shiro ni Tadayou Uwasa no Kemuri" (Japanese: 城にただよう噂の煙)	Yōsuke Hatta	January 24, 2017
The other chief officers are not sure whether to believe Grossular's suspicions about Jean. Jean has dinner with Mauve, who asks for his help in finding out any information about the rumored coup d'état on his regional visits. She is concerned that the Coming of Age Commemorative Ceremony on Dowa of King's grandson Prince Schwann, the only male heir and an 'idiot', will be an opportunity for powerful figures in outlying regions to take action. He accepts her request. Meanwhile, Prince Schwann plans to ascend the throne at the ceremony, disband the ACCA, and take control of the Privy Council. At the ceremony, the king welcomes everyone but does not abdicate, as Prince Schwann expected. Jean encounters Nino and Lotta at the ceremony, and Mauve also sees Nino but recognizes him as an ACCA agent, which he reports to Grossular. On one of Jean's many cigarette breaks, Lilium confronts Jean about suspicions that he is involved in the suspected coup d'état, but Lilium says that he believes it's a rumor started by Grossular to gain more power for ACCA and asks for Jean's help.
4	"Smoldering Embers in an Isolated Nation" "Tozasareta 'Kuni' no Kusuburi" (Japanese: 閉ざされた『国』のくすぶり)	Nobuhiro Mutō	January 31, 2017
Lotta prepares a box of gifts for the building owner, whom she has never met, which is delivered by Nino. Jean is in Suitsu District, which has strong restrictions on imports so that traditions can be maintained. Meanwhile, Lilium tells the Five Chief Officers that he does not believe Jean is involved in the suspected coup d'état. While on inspection, Jean is abducted by three coup plotters. He meets Biscuit, their leader, who says they only want greater freedom for Suitsu and the removal of Beurre, their self-serving district representative. While in their custody, the coup commences, and Jean escapes, assisted by Branch Supervisor Warbler. The coup fails, and the leaders are captured. In return for not informing headquarters of the attempted coup, the district officers allow Jean to leave, and Branch Supervisor Warbler keeps his position.
5	"Overlapping Footprints in the Distance" "Shisen no Saki, Omonaru Ashiato" (Japanese: 視線の先、重なる足跡)	Naoyuki Kuzuya	February 7, 2017
Officer Magi follows Lotta to a pancake parlor on orders from Prince Schwann and wants to find out her identity. He tries thick wheat toast for the first time and finds it amazing. Back at the capital, Jean tells Owl that Warbler may not be ready for more responsibility. He is reluctant to report the fiasco of the failed coup in Suitsu. Lilium questions Jean about Suitsu and reveals that Jean is being shadowed, possibly by someone he knows. Jean's next inspection is in Birra District, and Crow follows him. Birra has cold weather and is substantially self-sufficient in food, unlike poorer districts. Magi introduces the prince to toast, telling him that Lotta loves it and also telling the prince what he's found out about her. In Birra, Jean realizes that he's being watched and confronts his friend Nino, who admits that he's been assigned to observe Jean but does not know why. Back in the capital, Jean asks Nino to take Lotta to dinner every night while he's on his next assignment in Rokkusu District. In Rokkusu, Jean sees Chief Officer Grossular and approaches him.
6	"Where Pride and Train Tracks Lead" "Senro to Hokori no Mukau Saki" (Japanese: 線路と誇りの向かう先)	Shigatsu Yoshikawa	February 14, 2017
Thirteen years ago, Jean's parents died in a train accident that happened on the Peshi-Rokkusu border. Grossular was Rokkusu branch chief at the time and acted with integrity, taking full responsibility. Jean tells Grossular that he admires him for doing that and that he believes that neither of them is involved in a coup plot. Grossular thinks Jean is a little naive. At a New Year's party in Jean's apartment building, a number of staff are also invited and have a good time. Director-General Mauve believes that the coup is a rumor but still believes that something is afoot in Korore District. She also suspects that Jean is not loyal to her after he provides her with no new information from his inspections. On an inspection in Hare District, Jean senses that he is seen as a conduit for information between districts and tries to gather information for Mauve but gets very little. Meanwhile, Prince Schwann arranges for his portrait to be hung in a prominent place in the Dowa family portrait hall.
7	"The Truth Emerges in the Night Mists" "Yogiri ni Ukabu Shinjitsu" (Japanese: 夜霧にうかぶ真実)	Yōsuke Hatta	February 21, 2017
While in Dowa, Jean considers his position with regard to the rumors of a coup. On a day out with Nino, they find themselves in a cake shop where the king decides to stop on a rare outing, and he invites them to sit with him. Afterwards, Jean takes some of the snowball cakes back home for Lotta. Jean travels to Korore District and meets Branch Chief Griese. Prince Schwann visits his aunt to hear about the incident 30 years ago when her younger sister died along with her loyal guard, Abend. In Korore, Jean meets Director-General Mauve in the street, who reveals that he has royal blood and is first in line for succession, much to his surprise. She realizes that he is not involved in the coup plot and knows that he has kept some information from her. Back in the palace, Prince Schwann suspects that Lotta is related because of her resemblance to a portrait of the dead princess, but he is horrified to learn that Jean is her older brother. Meanwhile, in Korore, Jean encounters Nino, who prepares to reveal some information.
8	"The Princess Who Spread Her Wings and the Friend Who Had a Duty" "Tsubasa o Hirogeta Ōjo to Tomo no Tsutome" (Japanese: 翼を広げた王女と友のつとめ)	Keisuke Kojima	February 28, 2017
Thirty-three years ago, the second Princess of the Dowa Kingdom, Schnee, began to take an interest in national affairs, much to the concern of the King's advisor, Qwalm. With the agreement of the king, Qwalm asked Abend, the princess's aide, to make it appear that she died in a boating accident so that she could be removed from the royal register. Abend also took his family servant and son with him. The princess is happy to live as a citizen in Badon, and she and Abend part ways, but she is kept under observation during her life there. She met a young man, and they married and had a blonde-haired son, Jean, and then a daughter, Lotta. Prince Schwann was born ten years later to the youngest princess. The family servant's son, Nino, joined the young Jean at school to watch over him. Unfortunately, the former Princess Schnee, her husband, and the family servant died in a train derailment, leaving the children orphans. Nino explains all of this to Jean, including the fact that he has no claim to the Dowa throne.
9	"A Graceful Black Adder Bears Its Fangs" "Kiba o Muku Yūbina Kuro Hebi" (Japanese: 牙を剥く優美な黒蛇)	Katsuya Shigehara	March 7, 2017
Prince Schwann tells his aunt, the First Princess, about the former Princess Schnee's children, Jean and Lotta. She believes they may become obstacles to her ambitions, which concerns Magie, and she decides to act. Meanwhile, Jean asks Owl to spend time with Lotta while he's away on district inspections, and coincidentally, Magie arranges for Rail to protect Lotta. In Peshi District, Jean meets District Chief Herring, who pledges the district's support to Jean as heir to the Dowa throne. Back in Badon, Lotta and Rail are abducted in a car, and Lotta learns that she has royal blood. Fortunately, with the car caught in traffic, Owl intervenes and frees them. Mauve learns about the abduction attempt, revealing that the royal family also knows about the Otus siblings. The Five Chief Officers meet, and Grossular proposes that ACCA stage a coup d'état and establish Jean Otus as king. The aim is to prevent Prince Schwann from ascending the throne, abolishing ACCA, and creating an autocracy. They all agree. Later, Grossular and Lilium plan their strategy, including obtaining the compliance of Director-General Mauve. During the discussion, Lilium is revealed to be a major player in plotting the coup.
10	"Starfall in a City Without a Sky" "Sora no Nai Machi ni Furu Hoshi" (Japanese: 空のない街に降る星)	Naoyuki Kuzuya	March 14, 2017
In Yakkara District, the district chiefs promise Jean their support. Grossular and Lilium decide that any coup should be led by ACCA and that the prime objective should be to maintain order and the lives of citizens. Jean travels to nearby, desert-like Pranetta, where people live underground. He learns that, with little to win or lose, Pranetta has decided not to participate in the rumored coup but will support Jean. Back home, Jean and Lotta discuss their royal heritage in a matter-of-fact way. Suddenly, the king announces that he will not attend the ACCA centenary ceremony, which creates concern among the ACCA Five Chief Officers and implications for their coup attempt. Meanwhile, the First Princess, fearing threats from Prince Schwann and Second Princess Schnee's children Jean and Lotta, plans their elimination should the King pass away.
11	"Furawau's Flowers Smell of Malice" "Furawau no Hana wa Akui no Kaori" (Japanese: フラワウの花は悪意の香り)	Yōsuke Hatta	March 21, 2017
At the Furawau District Office, Jean meets Lilium's brother, the District Chief, and learns that Furawau is leading the coup. Meanwhile, the First Princess's assassins are following his movements. Their assassination attempt fails when Nino intercepts the bullets meant for Jean, but the incident is kept secret. Following the attempt, Jean decides to support the coup and accepts a Furawau cigarette to accompany the ones he has received from the other 12 districts, indicating their support. Meanwhile, ACCA staff are already discussing their advancement opportunities after the coup takes place. Suītsu branch supervisor Warbler feels that the coup is ill-advised and that ACCA may just be protecting its own existence, but eventually decides to support it. Later, Grossular tells Mauve that he is concerned about the motives of Lilium and his intentions to control Jean Otus.
12	"Where the Bird Flies" "Tori no Yukue" (Japanese: 鳥の行方)	Shingo Natsume	March 28, 2017
Lilium addresses ACCA about the arrangements for the upcoming coup at the coronation ceremony to install Jean as the heir to the throne, but Jean proposes that the announcement of his position be delayed. On the day of the proposed coup, Prince Schwann is surrounded by ACCA forces, but Mauve intervenes and tactfully gets the prince's assurance that ACCA will continue to manage the country. This avoids a confrontation, reducing the prince to a figurehead only, thus thwarting Lilium and the Furawau plan for control. Frustrated, Lilium withdraws, and Mauve is made head of ACCA, dispensing with the Five Chief Officers. Later, Jean explains that he was involved in Mauve's counterplan. Furawau secedes from the Dowa federation; however, the impact is less than expected, especially after the discovery of underground resources in Pranetta. As Jean and Lotta's royal heritage is not revealed, they are able to continue their normal lives. Jean tells Mauve how much he respects Grossular for supporting him when his parents were killed and hints that he is in love with Mauve, but understands that it will probably go unrequited.
OVA	"ACCA: 13-Territory Inspection Dept. Regards" "ACCA 13-Ku Kansatsu-Ka Regards" (Japanese: ACCA13区監察課 Regards)	Shingo Natsume; Keiichirō Saitō	February 14, 2020
One year after the attempted coup, Jean and the rest of the ACCA department are preparing for the first anniversary of the establishment of the new order. Jean is worried about his sister, Lotta, after hearing from her teacher that she may be concerned about her future, but she is fine. Also, Jean's new assistant, the rookie parrot, mentions rumors of a new coup, but after initially dismissing them as gossip, they raise them with Mauve, the Director-General of the ACCA, who reassures them that the ACCA is monitoring the situation.
