= Danza (manga) =

Japanese manga series

- Tankōbon volume cover
- Genre: Drama
- Manga
- Written by: Natsume Ono
- Published by: Kodansha
- English publisher: NA: Kodansha USA
- Imprint: Morning KC
- Magazine: Monthly Morning Two
- Original run: August 10, 2006 – October 30, 2007
- Volumes: 1
- icon

Danza (stylized in all caps) is a Japanese anthology manga series written and illustrated by Natsume Ono. It was serialized in Kodansha's seinen manga magazine Morning Two from August 2006 to June 2007, with its chapters collected in a single tankōbon volume.

== Publication ==
Written and illustrated by Natsume Ono, Danza was serialized in Kodansha's seinen manga magazine Morning Two from August 10, 2006, (Note: It started in the magazine's debut issue, released on August 10, 2006.) to October 30, 2007. Kodansha collected its chapters in a single tankōbon volume, released on December 21, 2007.

In North America, the manga has been licensed for English release by Kodansha USA. The collected volume was released on December 11, 2012.
