= Sweet Blue Flowers =

Japanese yuri manga series written and illustrated by Takako Shimura

- Cover of the first manga volume, featuring Akira (left) and Fumi (right).

青い花 (Aoi Hana)
- Genre: Coming-of-age; Romance; Yuri
- Manga
- Written by: Takako Shimura
- Published by: Ohta Publishing
- English publisher: NA: Viz Media
- Magazine: Manga Erotics F
- Original run: November 2004 – July 2013
- Volumes: 8
- Anime television series
- Directed by: Ken'ichi Kasai
- Produced by: Toshiaki Asaka; Yūji Matsukura; Kōji Yamamoto; Aya Saitō
- Written by: Fumihiko Takayama
- Music by: Takefumi Haketa
- Studio: J.C.Staff
- Licensed by: NA: Right Stuf Inc.
- Original network: Fuji TV (Noise)
- Original run: July 2, 2009 – September 10, 2009
- Episodes: 11
- icon

Sweet Blue Flowers (Japanese: 青い花, Hepburn: Aoi Hana; lit. "Blue Flower") is a Japanese yuri manga series written and illustrated by Takako Shimura. It was serialized between November 2004 and July 2013 in Ohta Publishing's manga magazine Manga Erotics F, with its chapters collected in eight tankōbon volumes. The story focuses on Fumi Manjōme, a lesbian high school girl, and her close childhood friend Akira Okudaira, who tries to keep her friends happy through difficult times.

An 11-episode anime television series produced by J.C.Staff and directed by Ken'ichi Kasai aired between July and September 2009 on Fuji TV. An Internet radio show to promote the anime was produced between June and October 2009 on HiBiKi Radio Station hosted by Ai Takabe and Yūko Gibu, who voiced Fumi and Akira in the anime, respectively. The manga was licensed in North America by Viz Media. The anime was licensed by Right Stuf Inc.

== Plot ==
At the start of Sweet Blue Flowers, Akira Okudaira, who is an entering high school student into Fujigaya Girls Academy, becomes reacquainted with her childhood friend Fumi Manjōme whom she has not seen for ten years. Fumi is attending Matsuoka Girl's High School where she quickly becomes friends with a handsome third-year student named Yasuko Sugimoto. Akira joins her school's drama club with her friend and classmate Kyōko Ikumi, who is in love with Yasuko, though Yasuko turns her down. Akira meets Kyōko's fiancé (in name only) Kō Sawanoi. Yasuko and Fumi become a couple, and Fumi comes out to Akira who is at first unsure on how to act, but still tries to support Fumi's new relationship.

Akira's drama club does an adaptation of Wuthering Heights for a drama festival; Fumi helps out with her friends Yōko Honatsugi, Misako Yasuda, and Miwa Motegi. Yasuko breaks up with Fumi, who learns that Yasuko's older sister Kazusa is marrying a teacher at Fujigaya named Masanori Kagami whom Yasuko had fallen in love with. Time passes after the wedding, and Yasuko decides to study abroad in London after graduating. Miwa and Akira's older brother Shinobu start going out, and Fumi tells Akira that she was her first love, much to Akira's embarrassment.

When Akira and her friends enter their second year of high school, an energetic first-year student named Haruka Ōno joins the Fujigaya drama club. Akira and Kyōko are split into different classrooms, and Akira meets a tall girl in her new class named Ryōko Ueda. The high school division of Fujigaya does the play Rokumeikan with Akira, Kyōko and Ryōko playing lead roles, though Ryōko only agrees to act because Akira also agrees to act alongside her. Fumi and Haruka become friends, and Haruka confides in Fumi that she suspects her older sister Orie may like women. Not knowing how to respond, Fumi seeks advice from Akira, but ends up confessing her love for her instead. Kyōko does not want Kō to break off the engagement, but he ends up finally breaking up with her. The play goes well and everyone praises the actress' performances. Over summer vacation, Akira suggests to Fumi that they go out together after thinking deeply about it.

== Characters ==
=== Main characters ===
Fumi Manjōme (万城目 ふみ, Manjōme Fumi)
Voiced by: Ai Takabe
Fumi is a first-year student at Matsuoka Girl's High School, and is a tall, shy girl prone to crying. Fumi comes back to the town she grew up in and she meets, without realizing it, her childhood friend Akira Okudaira. When they were much younger, Akira had been Fumi's bodyguard, keeping her out of harm and consoling her when she cried. Fumi is a lesbian and had her first romantic relationship with her older female cousin Chizu Hanashiro, with whom she had sex. Soon after Fumi moves back to Kamakura, she finds out Chizu will soon marry a man she has never met. Not long after meeting Yasuko Sugimoto in the literature club, Fumi develops a crush on Yasuko, who later asks her out.
Akira Okudaira (奥平 あきら, Okudaira Akira)
Voiced by: Yuko Gibu
Akira, nicknamed "Ah" by some of her friends, is an innocent and cheerful girl in her first-year at Fujigaya Girls Academy. She was Fumi's best friend in elementary school and rekindles that relationship upon meeting her again 10 years later. She acts as a main source of advice for Fumi. Akira joins the drama club because her friend Kyōko Ikumi is a member of it. She often talks about food and gives advice, and dislikes scary stories or things that test her courage. Unexpectedly and unintentionally, Akira usually spills secrets about her friends to other people when they ask her questions about them. Her intentions are pure, and only discusses them to help her friends out. However, this sometimes causes problems for them instead.

=== Fujigaya students ===
Kyōko Ikumi (井汲 京子, Ikumi Kyōko)
Voiced by: Yui Horie
Kyōko is a reckless girl who has eyes only for Yasuko. She is in the same class as Akira and is a member of the drama club. She has been dubbed as Princess for her charm, and is also skilled in sewing, art, tennis and acting. Many students look up to Kyōko in the same way Kyōko looks up to Yasuko. Kyōko is engaged (in name only) to Kō Sawanoi, a college student. This engagement was pushed for by Kyōko's mother while Kyōko and Kō were still young, and not all of Kō's relatives are happy about it.
Ayako Kawasaki (川崎 文子, Kawasaki Ayako)
Voiced by: Ryōko Ono
Ayako is a third-year student when Akira joins Fujigaya. She is a member of the drama club and plays Catherine opposite Yasuko's Heathcliffe in the Drama Festival production of Wuthering Heights. After graduation, she goes to study abroad in England.
Kaori Miura (三浦 香織, Miura Kaori)
Voiced by: Tomoko Nakamura
Kaori is a senior and the president of the drama club in Akira's first year. She regularly scolds the club's absent advisor, Masanori Kagami, for not showing a deeper interest in the club.
Haruka Ōno (大野 春花, Ōno Haruka)
Haruka is a girl who joins Fujigaya as a student one year below Akira and becomes a new member of the drama club. She has an endearing personality that makes it easy for her to become friendly with anyone, though she is prone to making silly mistakes. Many students, especially Kyōko, remark on how similar Haruka is to how Akira was when she first came to Fujigaya. Haruka has an older sister, Orie, who is in a romantic relationship with Hinako Yamashina, a science teacher at Fujigaya. Haruka's family owns an old hot springs inn.
Ryōko Ueda (上田 良子, Ueda Ryōko)
Ryōko is a tall girl who sits beside Akira in class in their second year. She has a gentle, quiet personality and enjoys reading; she's a library aide at Fujigaya. Her acting talents are noticed while she's reading aloud (to herself) Deer Cry Pavilion, a play that the Drama Club intends to put on that year. She ends up playing one of the leads. She says Akira is so small and cute that she wants to put Akira in her pocket.

=== Matsuoka students ===
Yasuko Sugimoto (杉本 恭己, Sugimoto Yasuko)
Voiced by: Chiemi Ishimatsu
Yasuko is a popular third-year senior at Matsuoka Girl's High School. She is a cool upperclassman and the captain of the basketball team, though Fumi mistakes her for being in the literature club when they first meet. After visiting Fujigaya Girls Academy and rejecting Kyōko's confession, she asks out Fumi, who accepts. Yasuko developed romantic feelings for a teacher, Masanori Kagami, when she was attending Fujigaya. After his rejection, she switched schools and changed focus from drama to basketball. Yasuko has three older sisters who all attended Fujigaya: Shinako, Kazusa, and Kuri.
Yōko Hon'atsugi (本厚木 洋子, Hon'atsugi Yōko)
Voiced by: Sayuri Yahagi
Pon is a member of Fumi's first-year class and the first person to approach her. With her middle school friends Mogii and Yassan, she wants to form a drama club at Matsuoka. She tries to get Fumi to join, but Fumi isn't interested. Pon has a bright, frank personality and wears her hair in a shoulder-length bob cut. She is a bit on the clumsy side and has a hard time competing against Kyōko in tennis. She later turns out to be a talented script writer, which impresses Fumi.
Miwa Motegi (茂木 美和, Motegi Miwa)
Voiced by: Aki Toyosaki
Mogii is a member of the Matsuoka Drama Club with her friends Pon and Yassan. She has a gentle personality and wears her hair in a shoulder-length wavy style. She is the only one of her friends to be put into a separate class in their second year. Miwa becomes interested in Akira's brother Shinobu and the two start dating around the end of her first year of high school. Akira finds this awkward, but she and Mogii remain friends.
Misako Yasuda (安田 美沙子, Yasuda Misako)
Voiced by: Yuka Iguchi
Yassan is president of the 3-person drama club at Matsuoka. She has thick eyebrows and boyish-short, frizzy hair. She likes to test people's courage or scaring them by either participating in a game of "test of courage" or telling ghost stories. Despite this, she gets emotional very easily when it comes to things she cares about, like her friends or the drama club.
Kaori Ueno (上野 佳織, Ueno Kaori)
Voiced by: Kanae Oki
Kaori is a classmate and friend of Yasuko. She's in the literature club with Fumi. Kaori and Yasuko's friendship is the reason Yasuko hangs out in the Literature Club room, and therefore the reason Yasuko and Fumi met.

=== Other characters ===
Okudaira family

- Shinobu Okudaira (奥平 忍, Okudaira Shinobu; Voiced by: Shinji Kawada): Akira's older brother, who attends college. He is constantly worried about his sister, and often takes her places in his car, though Akira often gets very annoyed at how protective her brother is towards her. When she was younger, he would sneak into her futon at night; now he tries to follow her around when he thinks she might be meeting with guys. He suspects Kō of being interested in Akira. Later, Shinobu starts dating Mogii and relaxes a little about Akira.
- Sakiko Okudaira (奥平 咲子, Okudaira Sakiko; Voiced by: Junko Kitanishi): Akira and Shinobu's mother, who tends to get easily excited. She often yells at Shinobu for his inappropriate behavior regarding Akira, but she also worries about Akira, just like Shinobu does. (She's just less protective about it.) Her sister describes Sakiko as the black sheep of the family. Sakiko was friends with Yoshie years ago, and regularly visits with her now that Fumi's family has moved back.
- Yoshimichi Okudaira (奥平 義道, Okudaira Yoshimichi; Voiced by: Tsutomu Densaka): Akira and Shinobu's father. He doesn't appear much, but he seems to have a personality similar to Shinobu's. He's a salaryman working for an IT company.
- Keiko (恵子): Keiko is Akira and Shinobu's aunt, as well as Sakiko's sister. She currently lives in the outskirts of Yokohama, but she graduated from Fujigaya. Keiko and Sakiko don't always get along because of snobbish comments Keiko makes, while Akira is afraid of Keiko's forceful personality. When Shinobu introduces Mogii to her, Keiko overwhelms Mogii so much that she basically hides behind Shinobu.

Manjōme family

- Yoshie Manjōme (万城目 芳江, Majōme Yoshie; Voiced by: Ayumi Fujimura): Fumi's mother. She is good friends with Sakiko Okudaira.
- Akio Manjōme (城目 章夫, Manjōme Akio; Voiced by: Mitsuru Ogata): Fumi's father. He works at a bank. His job transfers him back to Kamakura, which brings Fumi and Akira back together.
- Chizu Hanashiro (花城 千津, Hanashiro Chizu; Voiced by: Fuyuka Oura): Fumi's cousin who lived near Fumi's family while she was going to college. She and Fumi were very close as children and developed a more physically intimate relationship once they were older. Fumi is in love with Chizu, but Chizu chooses to marry instead, breaking Fumi's heart. Chizu's first child looks a lot like Fumi did as a baby.
- Fumi's grandmother (ふみの祖母; Voiced by: Kiyoko Miyazawa): Fumi's strict grandmother, who used to treat Akira like her own granddaughter (that is, strictly). She died two years before Fumi's family moved back to Kamakura. When Fumi is feeling bad about herself, she sometimes hears her own negative thoughts as if her grandmother were saying them.

Sugimoto family

- Chie Sugimoto (杉本 千恵, Sugimoto Chie; Voiced by: Shōko Tsuda): Yasuko's mother. She often pretends to be scandalized by her daughters' antics, but then says the most scandalous things herself. Despite this, she shows a caring side to Fumi when she visits.
- Shinako Sugimoto (杉本 姿子, Sugimoto Shinako; Voiced by: Mamiko Noto): The oldest Sugimoto sister, who likes to joke and tease Yasuko. She attended Fujigaya at the same time as Hinako; Orie had a crush on Shinako in school before Hinako confessed. Shinako was quite popular in school and often had younger students admiring her and wanting to date her. She dated a female student named Kaoruko, who broke up with her, but it seems they got back together several times. Shinako regularly had many girlfriends and says she loved all of them.
- Kazusa Sugimoto (杉本 和佐, Sugimoto Kazusa; Voiced by: Yukari Fukui): Kazusa is an artist. She has a kind personality and appears very feminine, except when she paints. For a short time, she worked as an art teacher at Fujigaya after graduating from there. While teaching, she met her future husband Masanori Kagami, also a teacher. She knows two of her sisters loved her husband when they were younger, but this doesn't appear to bother her. She also teaches Kyōko private art lessons and suspects Kyōko's feelings for Yasuko.
- Kuri Sugimoto (杉本 公理, Sugimoto Kuri; Voiced by: Mai Nakahara): Kuri is similar to Yasuko in that she was very popular when attending Fujigaya. Also like Yasuko, she too fell in love with Masanori Kagami, but she never told him her feelings. She wields a blunt personality and smokes. While at Fujigaya, her best friend Komako had a crush on her, though Kuri may not know this.
- Masanori Kagami (各務 正則, Kagami Masanori; Voiced by: Kenji Hamada): Kazusa's husband, he teaches at Fujigaya, where they met. He nominally advises the Drama Club, but he almost never shows up, which the club members, especially Kaori, remark on often. He was the one who named Yasuko "Mistress of the Library"; Yasuko left Fujigaya after confessing her feelings to him and being turned down. He withheld this information from Kyōko when she asked if he knew why Yasuko had left. After his marriage to Kazusa, both Kuri and Yasuko seem to accept that he is beyond their reach.
- Fumi (ふみ; Voiced by: Mina Kobayashi): Sugimoto family cook and helper. She is soft-hearted and allows the younger Fumi to take tea to Yasuko after the sisters fight with each other.
- Ogino (荻野; Voiced by: Nobuaki Kanemitsu): Sugimoto family driver. He insists on driving Yasuko around when he can.

Ikumi family

- Kayoko Ikumi (井汲 加代子, Ikumi Kayoko): Kyōko's mother. Kyōko hated her for a long time because of Kayoko's illness and how other people treated their family as a result. However, as Kyōko grew up, she came to realize that this wasn't her mother's problem. Kayoko is still disliked by many members of the Sawanoi family and is gossiped about by them, as Akira discovered by accident.
- Kō Sawanoi (澤乃井 康, Sawanoi Kō; Voiced by: Shintarō Asanuma, Akiko Tanaka (child Kō)): Kyōko's fiancé, in name only. He is a college student from a wealthy family. They have known each other since childhood and Kō has a great concern for Kyōko, but he knows that she is in love with someone else.
- Hanae (花絵; Voiced by: Sachiko Kojima): Kō's aunt, who welcomes Kyōko's friends to their family vacation home. She is kind to Fumi and Akira when they get sick, and she tries to stand up for Kyōko when other family members complain about her mother.

Ōno family

- Orie Ōno (大野 織江, Ōno Orie): Haruka's older sister. Orie also attended Fujigaya, where she fell in love with her best friend Hinako. Haruka finds a love letter in Orie's room and realizes that Orie is probably a lesbian. This worries her at first, but Haruka has always been close to Hinako as well, so she accepts the relationship.
- Hinako Yamashina (山科 日向子, Yamashina Hinako): A science teacher at Fujigaya, and the homeroom teacher of Akira's second year class. She also attended Fujigaya, where she and Orie fell in love. Hinako often finds herself giving students advice; for example, Fumi comes to her when she's worried about her relationship with Akira. She also rescues the drama club when Haruka leaves several of the costumes at home right before the festival. Since Orie and Hinako have known each other since high school, Haruka refers to her as Hina.
- Haruka's mother: Haruka and Orie's mother is invested in her children's lives, but she also knows when to let go. She has given up on Orie getting married. Haruka seems to have inherited some of her mother's personality, including her loud and friendly nature. However, her mother is more respectful of other people's privacy than Haruka tends to be.

== Production ==
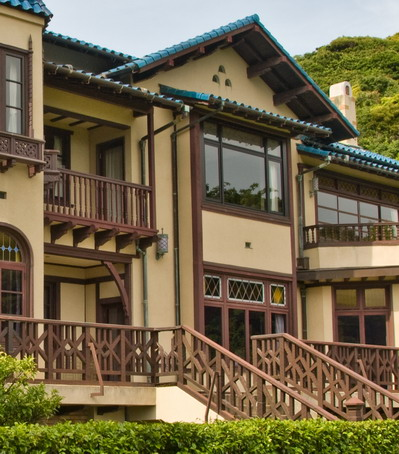
The entrance to the Kamakura Museum of Literature and the equivalent scene used for the exterior of Fujigaya Girls Academy (from Sweet Blue Flowers volume four, chapter 20).

=== Manga ===
When Takako Shimura was writing her manga Dōnika Naru Hibi, she became interested in a story between girls, leading her to create Sweet Blue Flowers. While she felt that the story focus should be on girls for yuri works, Shimura also wanted to introduce some males since she thought it would add an interesting aspect to the series. Shimura felt it difficult to balance the need for some males, but also not wanting to add too many. When depicting the characters, she did not want to write about them going through puberty. When starting to write Sweet Blue Flowers, Shimura noticed that, in her opinion, she felt like a person depicting sexual perversion for writing about yuri relationships.

Before starting to write Sweet Blue Flowers, Shimura went with her editor to Kamakura, Kanagawa with the main objective of visiting the Kamakura Museum of Literature. Shimura took many pictures during their trip, and thought Kamakura felt like a great place to set the story. With a guide book of Kamakura in hand, Shimura thought of various locations that would later appear in Sweet Blue Flowers, such as the café that the characters frequent. Many of the pictures taken turned out unusable, though there were some she used as references for the setting, such as modeling the exterior of Fujigaya after the Kamakura Museum of Literature. Shimura also used the Komaba Park estate in Meguro, Tokyo for the interior of Fujigaya, such as with the staircase featured in chapter eleven. A large Japanese-style house on the same property as the Kamakura Museum of Literature was used as a model for the Sugimoto residence. The Enoshima Electric Railway is also featured in the series.

=== Anime ===
In 2005, anime producer Yūji Matsukura of J.C.Staff was meeting at Ohta Publishing for an unrelated anime project and told the editor-in-chief of Manga Erotics F, "U-mura", that he liked the Sweet Blue Flowers manga and would like to produce it into an anime in the future. Shortly after the first manga volume was released in December 2005, Matsukura went to a Media Factory producer, who also agreed to collaborating on a Sweet Blue Flowers anime. Matsukura went on to say that J.C.Staff is not the type of company to usually go out and make suggestions for anime projects and it was only because he liked Sweet Blue Flowers and later met U-mura by chance that an anime eventually became possible. Matsukura was in charge of choosing much of the staff. Ken'ichi Kasai was chosen as the director, because of his intuitiveness to make good-feeling anime according to Matsukura. For the series composition, Matsukura thought it would appear unexpected to pick Fumihiko Takayama, though he was asked to participate, because he likes shōjo manga. Takayama, who has experience as an animation director, would often make suggestions during the production of the animation, enough for Matsukura to joke that Takayama should have been staffed as the director instead, though Takayama flatly refused. Neither Kasai nor Takayama initially knew of the manga, but were approached by Matsukura, because he thought they would enjoy working on the project. This was the same case for the character designer and chief animation director Masayuki Onji.

Takayama initially suggested not to produce an anime, because of the difficulty in maintaining the feeling of the original work, and wanted to let someone else deal with it. Further difficulty was cited in Sweet Blue Flowers not being a plot driven story, but rather character driven. After accepting and beginning work on the scenario, Takayama happened to read a poem titled "Hana no Oshie" (花の教え) by Bin Ueda which had the phrase "At this time, the lily in the tailwind" (この時、百合は追風に, Kono toki, yuri wa Oikaze ni), and remarked that this was like the world was telling him he should write the scenario. At first, Kasai thought the entire work was going to be about yuri, but felt that an important point of the story was that Yasuko Sugimoto initially likes her teacher Masanori Kagami, rather than it being a complete yuri story if Yasuko had liked a female teacher. When writing the scenario for the first episode, Takayama found the length to be insufficient, and even after handing it over to Kasai, the episode was still about two minutes short. The missing material was filled in with various scenes of Fumi and Akira when they were younger, and Akira going to school. Where and how to end the anime was also an issue when writing the scenario, and it took a long time to decide.

== Media ==
=== Manga ===
Written and illustrated by Takako Shimura, Sweet Blue Flowers started in Ohta Publishing's manga magazine Manga Erotics F in November 2004. It finished on July 6, 2013. Eight tankōbon volumes were released between December 15, 2005, and September 12, 2013.

The manga has been licensed for release in French by Asuka under the title Fleurs Bleues. The series was released digitally in English on JManga, but after JManga closed down, Digital Manga Publishing took over the English-language publication rights. The series was later re-licensed in 2016 by Viz Media, who will publish the series in omnibus editions. In Spain, it was titled Flores azules by Milky Way. It allegedly sold poorly, prompting the editors to reply, "Our warehouse is full of flowers" when asked in the 2018 Barcelona Manga Convention about the possibility of licensing other yuri titles.

=== Internet radio show ===
An Internet radio show to promote the anime series called Aoi Hana: Sweet Blue Radio (青い花 〜Sweet Blue Radio〜) was broadcast between June 26 and October 30, 2009, on HiBiKi Radio Station in nineteen episodes, and aired between July 3 and November 6, 2009, on Media Factory Net Radio. The show, which aired every Friday, was hosted by Ai Takabe and Yūko Gibu, who voiced Fumi and Akira in the anime, respectively. Chiemi Ishimatsu, the voice of Yasuko, also joined the show for three broadcasts in late August 2009. A CD containing a couple of parts from some episodes as well as newly recorded material was released on December 22, 2009.

=== Anime ===
An 11-episode anime television series adaptation was produced by the animation studio J.C.Staff and directed by Ken'ichi Kasai. The anime aired between July 2 and September 10, 2009, on Fuji TV as the third series in Fuji TV's Noise timeslot. It was also streamed online on Crunchyroll. The anime has been licensed by The Right Stuf International and was released on subtitled DVD under their Lucky Penny label on March 5, 2013.

The series has two pieces of theme music; one opening theme and one ending theme. The opening theme is "Aoi Hana" (青い花) by Kukikodan, and the ending theme is "Centifolia" (センティフォリア, Sentiforia) by Ceui. The single for "Aoi Hana" was released on July 22, 2009, followed by the single for "Centifolia" on August 5, 2009. The anime's original soundtrack was released on August 26, 2009, by Lantis. Fuji TV producer Kōji Yamamoto revealed that a second season is not planned due to low DVD sales of the anime.

== Reception ==
Erica Friedman, the president of Yuricon and ALC Publishing, reviewed the Sweet Blue Flowers anime and manga, praising Takako Shimura's original cover and interior art from the manga, and how that art style is "captured in the anime through crisp, realistic art." The story is also lauded for "far surpassing most Yuri in general" by its strength in a "character-driven" story, which is described as being both "aesthetically appealing" and "simple". Friedman cites that Sweet Blue Flowers could easily be compared to a Jane Austen story, and feels that the story is not "a melodrama or a parody, like Strawberry Panic!." Friedman later called Sweet Blue Flowers the best yuri anime of 2009, where she wrote how the series was one of the "most realistic portrayals of a young woman in love with another woman ever seen in an anime." Friedman also praised the faithful adaptation from manga to anime, including parts that she felt were done better animated.

Sweet Blue Flowers was featured as Anime News Network's Import of the Month in May 2007 where it was described as "the best of its genre" that "makes stuff like MariMite and Strawberry Panic! look like trashy dime-store romance by comparison." Takako Shimura's art was seen as "economical" with "clean layouts, sparse backgrounds, and everything that needs to be said contained within a single facial expression." However, the plot points are described as so calm that they are easy to gloss over. The relationships presented are seen as complex and the reviewer felt it was difficult to remember all the particulars in the story. G.B. Smith of Mania described the anime as presenting the story in a "sincere and open way...without any gimmicks," as opposed to other yuri-themed series that are "either heavily comedic in nature, or have disguised the relationship in one way or another." The replay value of the anime was questioned, because of situations that "lack a certain amount of compelling drama that makes for a truly memorable experience." The Sweet Blue Flowers anime was selected as a recommended work by the awards jury of the thirteenth Japan Media Arts Festival in 2009. Additionally, Beatrice Viri of CBR praised the manga for exploring LGBTQ themes, and called it "a sweet romance that many will enjoy."
