= Noise (TV programming block) =

Fuji TV late night anime programming block

Noise (stylized in capital letters) was a Fuji TV late night anime programming block, broadcast each Wednesday night from 26:08 to 26:38. It is Fuji TV's second late night anime-themed time block, after noitaminA, which airs every Thursday night. It first began on October 15, 2008, with Michiko to Hatchin. After broadcasting three anime series, the block was cancelled in favor of extending noitaminA which started airing two productions at once instead of only one.

== Programs ==
| # | Title | Date | Ep. | Studio |
|---|---|---|---|---|
| 1 | Michiko & Hatchin | October 16, 2008 - March 18, 2009 | 22 | Manglobe |
| 2 | Ristorante Paradiso | April 9, 2009 - June 25, 2009 | 11 | David Production |
| 3 | Sweet Blue Flowers | July 2, 2009 - September 10, 2009 | 11 | J.C.Staff |
