= Kamakura Museum of Literature =

Coordinates: 35°18′56.16″N 139°32′20.20″E

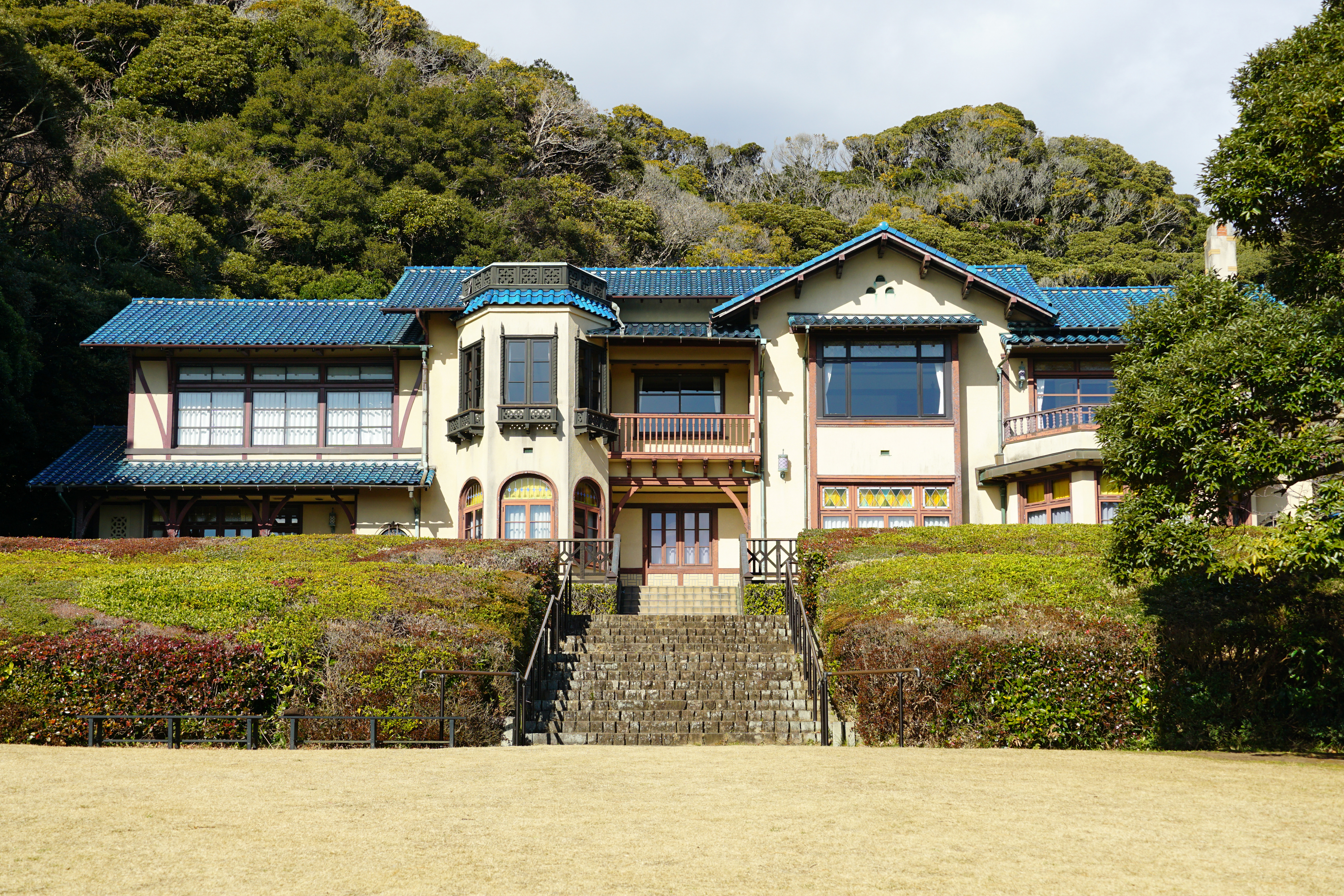
- Established: 1985
- Location: Kamakura, Kanagawa
- Type: Literature museum
- Public transit access: Bus or Enoden train from Kamakura station
- Website: http://www.kamakurabungaku.com/ (in Japanese)

The Kamakura Museum of Literature (鎌倉文学館, Kamakura Bungakukan) is a small museum in Kamakura, Kanagawa, Japan, that contains material about writers who have lived, died, or were active in the city of Kamakura itself. The museum displays personal effects, manuscripts, first editions, and documents owned by well over a hundred writers of Japanese literature, including Natsume Sōseki and Kawabata Yasunari, as well as film director Yasujirō Ozu. The villa that hosts the museum, its large garden and its rose garden are also of great interest.

The plaque in front of the villa says:

Kamakura Museum of Literature (a villa of the old, noble Maeda family)

The house was erected in 1936 by Toshinari Maeda (前田利為), the 16th head of the Maeda family, (part of the Kaga clan). It stands half way up a hill in Kamakura, overlooking Sagami Bay. It represents the villa architecture of those days. Eisaku Satō, a former Prime Minister and Nobel Peace Prize winner, once made use of it as his villa. It also appeared in a scene from "Spring Snow", a novel by Yukio Mishima, a well-known novelist. It opened to the public as Kamakura Museum of Literature in November 1985. The Main Building of the Kamakura Museum of Literature was registered as a National Registered Tangible Property in April 2000.
