= Manga Erotics F =

Japanese manga magazine

- Categories: Manga
- Frequency: Monthly (2001–2002); Bi-monthly (2002–2014)
- First issue: January 1, 2001
- Final issue: July 8, 2014
- Company: Ohta Publishing
- Country: Japan
- Based in: Tokyo
- Language: Japanese
- Website: www.ohtabooks.com/eroticsf/

Manga Erotics F (Japanese: マンガ・エロティクス・エフ, Hepburn: Manga Erotikusu Efu) was a bimonthly manga magazine by Ohta Publishing. It was first published as a monthly magazine on January 1, 2001, and switched to bimonthly in May 2002, releasing on the seventh of odd months. It ceased publication on July 8, 2014, with volume 88.

The manga magazine was created as a merger of two former magazines by Ohta Publishing, the monthly Manga Erotics and the seasonal Manga F. Manga artist Naoki Yamamoto had a supervisory role in the publication of the magazine, to which he also contributed some works.

The magazine was considered "underground" and published "artsy sex comics," according to Jason Thompson. Kentarō Mizumoto sees the influence of the New Wave movement on Manga Erotics F. Unlike what its title may suggest, works lacking direct sexual expression were also included.

== Contributors and titles ==
- Mitsue Aoki (青木光恵)
  - Papaiya Gundan (パパイヤ軍団★)
- Inio Asano (浅野いにお)
  - A Girl on the Shore (うみべの女の子)
- Usamaru Furuya (古屋兎丸)
  - Suicide Circle (自殺サークル) (2002)
  - Lychee Light Club (ライチ☆光クラブ) (2005–2006)
  - Innocents Shōnen Jūjigun (インノサン少年十字軍) (2008–2011)
- Lily Hoshino (星野リリィ)
  - Romance of an Ancient Dreaming City (夢見る古都)
- Sukune Inugami (犬上すくね)
- Junko Kawakami
- Yōko Kondō
  - Kinu no Himo (2002–2003)
- Jiro Matsumoto (松本次郎)
  - Velveteen & Mandala
- Asumiko Nakamura (中村 明日美子)
  - Utsubora: The Story of a Novelist
- Natsume Ono (オノ・ナツメ)
  - Ristorante Paradiso (リストランテ・パラディーゾ)
  - The Fleeing Man (逃げる男)
- Hiroaki Samura (沙村広明)
  - Spring Breeze Snegurochka (春風のスネグラチカ)
- Takako Shimura (志村貴子)
  - Happy-Go-Lucky Days (どうにかなる日々)
  - Sweet Blue Flowers (青い花)
- Naoki Yamamoto (山本直樹)
  - Watching Fuckin' TV All Time Makes a Fool (テレビばかり見てると馬鹿になる)
