= Usamaru Furuya =

Japanese manga artist

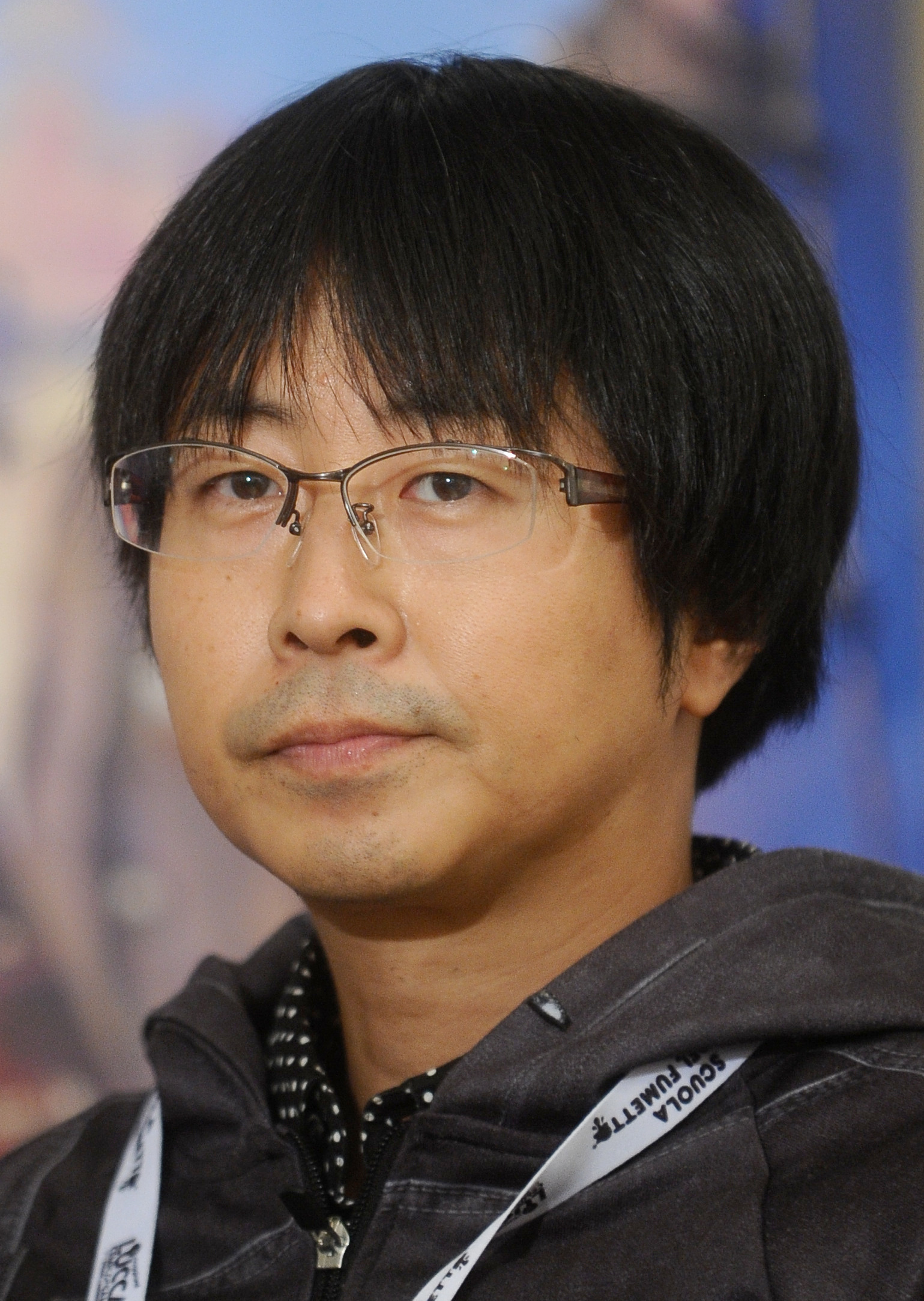
- Usamaru Furuya at Lucca Comics & Games 2015
- Born: January 25, 1968 (age 58); Tokyo, Japan
- Occupations: Manga artist, illustrator
- Writing career
- Notable works: Palepoli; Short Cuts; Lychee Light Club

Usamaru Furuya (古屋 兎丸, Furuya Usamaru; born January 25, 1968) is a Japanese manga artist.

== Biography ==
During elementary school, Furuya enrolled in the Osamu Tezuka Manga Correspondence Course and by the time he reached high school he had discovered a darker, more underground style.

He graduated from Tama Art University, where he majored in oil painting and developed an interest in sculpting and Butoh dance. During college his work evolved from figurative to eventually dealing more with abstract shapes.

In 1994, Furuya published his debut series Palepoli in the renowned alternative manga magazine Garo. After graduating from college, he initially planned to work as a full-time artist while doing illustrations on the side, but his success in manga shifted his focus. Soon after, he published the gag manga Short Cuts in the mainstream seinen manga magazine Weekly Young Sunday.

He was a regular contributor to the alternative manga magazine Manga Erotics F from its beginnings in 2001 on. For this magazine he created the manga Lychee Light Club, based on a stage play, about a group of middle school boys aiming to build an AI with cruel tactics has been adapted into a TV anime series.

Otherwise, since the 2000s, he has published in mainstream seinen and shōnen manga magazines of different publishers like Kodansha, Shogakukan, Shueisha and Shinchosha, but also drew a yonkoma series for the daily newspaper Yomiuri Shimbun and made a manga biography about Emperor Akihito's life for the weekly magazine Shūkan Post.

== Style and themes ==
Furuya works across different manga genres and has a broad variety of art styles, ranging from photorealistic drawing to mascot-like cute characters. His work has been published in major manga magazines as well as more underground magazines and cultural magazines. Masanao Amano describes that Furuya is known for "taking ordinary everyday situations, and adding instantaneous humor or transforming them into a mysterious world that showcases his surrealistic sense."

His work is influenced by the New Wave movement in manga in the 1980s.

Christianity is a recurring theme of his work. According to Sean Patrick Webb, christianity is found "most often in the context of Japanese children and adolescents struggling against childish impulses and making the transition to adulthood."

== Reception ==
Furuya's manga have been translated, among others, into English, French, German, Italian and Spanish.

While Furuya has not won any major manga awards so far, he was nominated or selected several times:

Award	Year	Category	Recipient(s)	Result	Ref.
American Library Association	2012	Great Graphic Novels for Teens	Genkaku Picasso	Nominated	
Japan Media Arts Festival	2011	Manga Award	No Longer Human	Jury selection	
Japan Media Arts Festival	2015	Manga Award	Joshikōsei ni Korosaretai	Jury selection	

== Works ==
=== Manga ===
Title	Year	Notes	Refs
Palepoli (パレポリ)	1994–1995	Serialized in Garo; Published in 1 vol. Excerpted in Viz's defunct Pulp magazine and in Secret Comics Japan, also from Viz.	
Short Cuts (ショートカッツ)	1996–1999	Serialized in Weekly Young Sunday; Published in 2 vol. Published in English by Viz	
Wsamarus 2001	1998–1999	Serialied in Studio Voice; Published in 1 vol.	
Garden	2000	Short story collection with stories previously published in Comic Cue, Manga Erotics and Garo	
Plastic Girl	2000	Short story collection	
The Music of Marie (Marieの奏でる音楽, Marie no kanaderu ongaku)	2000–2001	Serialized in Comic Birz; Published in 2 vol. Published in English by One Peace books	
Suicide Circle (自殺サークル, Jisatsu Sākuru)	2002	Serialized in Manga Erotics F Published by Ohta Publishing in 1 vol. Published in French by Casterman as Le Cercle du Suicide	
π (パイ)	2002–2005	Serialized in Big Comic Spirits; Published in 9 vol.	
Donki kōrin (鈍器降臨)	2004	Serialized in Da Vinci; Published by Media Factory in 1 vol.	
Happiness (ハピネス)	2006	Short story collection	
Lychee Light Club (ライチ☆光クラブ, Litchi☆Hikari Club)	2005–2006	Written by Norimizu Ameya; Serialized in Manga Erotics F Published in 1 vol. Published in English by Vertical Inc as Lychee Light Club	
Shōnen Shōjo Hyōryōki (少年少女漂流記)	2006	Written by Otsuichi; Published by Shueisha in 1 vol.	
51 Ways to Save Her (彼女を守る51の方法, Kanojo wo Mamoru 51 no Hōhō)	2006–2007	Serialized in Weekly Comic Bunch; Published in 5 vol. Licensed in English by CMX but never published Loosely adapted into the anime series Tokyo Magnitude 8.0	
Innocents Shōnen Jūjigun (インノサン少年十字軍)	2008–2011	Serialized in Manga Erotics F Published by Ohta Publishing in 3 vol.	
Genkaku Picasso (幻覚ピカソ)	2008–2010	Serialized in Jump Square; Published in 3 vol. Published in English by Viz as Genkaku Picasso	
POP-kun (POPくん)	2008–2012	Serialized in Yomiuri Shimbun	
No Longer Human (人間失格, Ningen Shikkaku)	2009–2011	Adaptation of No Longer Human by Osamu Dazai; Serialized in Weekly Comic Bunch; Published by Shinchosha in 3 vol. Published in English by Vertical Inc	
Teiichi no Kuni (帝一の國)	2010–2016	Serialized in Jump SQ.19 and Jump Square; Published in 14 vol.	
Bokura no☆Hikari Club (ぼくらの☆ひかりクラブ)	2011–2012	Prequel to Lychee Light Club; Serialized in Pocopoco; Published by Ohta Publishing in 2 vol.	
Joshikōsei ni Korosaretai (女子高生に殺されたい)	2013–2016	Serialized in Go Go Bunch; Published by Shinchosha in 2 vol.	
Shōnen-tachi no Iru Tokoro (少年たちのいるところ)	2016–2017	Serialized in Go Go Bunch; Published by Shinchosha in 1 vol.	
Amane†Gymnasium (アマネ†ギムナジウム)	2017–2020	Serialized in Morning Two; Published by Kodansha in 7 vol.	
Akihito Tennō Monogatari (明仁天皇物語)	2019	Based on a script by Issei Eifuku; Serialized in Shūkan Post; Published by Shogakukan in 1 vol.	
Lunatic Circus (ルナティックサーカス)	2020–Present	Serialized in Monthly Comic Bunch; Published by Shinchosha in 3 vol. (as of January 2023)	
Tosho Iin Kai (図書委員界)	2021–2022	Written by Rina Ikoma; Serialized in Monthly Comic Bunch; Published by Shinchosha in 1 vol.	

=== Illustrations ===
- Flowers

=== Films/plays ===
- ZOO (Screenplay, storyboards, character design)
- Noriko's Dinner Table (紀子の食卓) (Man in coffee shop)
- Ichiban kireina mizu (いちばんきれいな水) (Original work)
- Short Cuts (ショートカッツ) (Original work)
- Love Exposure (愛のむきだし) (Miyanishi)
