= A Girl on the Shore =

Japanese manga series

- Cover of the first volume

うみべの女の子 (Umibe no Onnanoko)
- Genre: Coming-of-age
- Manga
- Written by: Inio Asano
- Published by: Ohta Publishing
- English publisher: NA: Vertical
- Magazine: Manga Erotics F
- Original run: July 7, 2009 – January 7, 2013
- Volumes: 2

A Girl on the Shore (Japanese: うみべの女の子, Hepburn: Umibe no Onnanoko) is a Japanese manga series written and illustrated by Inio Asano. It is about two junior high school students who enter into a casual sex relationship. The manga was serialized in Ohta Publishing's Manga Erotics F from 2009 to 2013 and is licensed in North America by Vertical.

On August 20, 2021, the series received a film adaptation directed by Atsushi Ueda, starring Ruka Ishikawa and Yuzu Aoki.

== Plot ==
After Misaki, an upperclassman, forces Koume Sato to give him fellatio on their first date, she uses Keisuke Isobe as a rebound and asks him to take her virginity. The two enter into a casual sex relationship, and although Isobe liked Koume in the seventh grade, she does not reciprocate feelings for him. Since Isobe's parents are not home often, Koume spends time at his house reading manga, listening to music, and sexually experimenting with Isobe. Haunted by his brother's suicide, Isobe also continues his brother's anime blog. When Koume receives a camera as a present, Isobe gives her an extra SD card he found, on which she discovers pictures of a girl on the shore and later deletes them from his computer out of jealousy. This causes Isobe to ignore her and Koume realizes she likes him. However, he breaks up with her out of boredom. Shota Kashima—the school's top baseball player and Koume's childhood friend—confronts Isobe after rumors spread of their relationship. Isobe provokes Kashima, and when Kashima rushes him, they fall over a bannister.

Kashima injures his leg, forcing him to be unable to compete in a prefectural tournament. Koume hangs out with Misaki and his friends, but leaves after he tries to get her to smoke cannabis and force her to kiss him. Koume visits Isobe at his house, they have sex, and he tells her of his intention to commit suicide. Koume writes a letter for him and buys a copy of Happy End's album containing the song "Gather the Wind" (which she had heard at his house), planning to give them to him at their school festival. Isobe attacks Masaki and his friend, calling the police on them so they can find the illegal cannabis in their bags. On the day of their school festival—Isobe's birthday as well as the day his brother committed suicide—Koume requests "Gather The Wind" to be played, but finds that Isobe has not been to school in three days. Koume desperately searches for Isobe during a storm, but does not find him at home, only a sticky note saying "sorry". When she sees a cheerful Isobe a week later, he tells her that he met the girl in the pictures and got her email address, aiming to get into her high school. Koume confesses her feelings to him and asks him out, but he declines. In high school, Koume obtains a boyfriend, whom she kisses. On her way home, she meets Kashima, who reveals that he still has feelings for her. On the shore, she exclaims that she found what she was looking for: "something bigger than everything else, the sea!"

== Production ==
When Asano started out in the manga industry, he saw sexuality as normal part of life so he used it to portray reality in his work. He felt that he created A Girl on the Shore at the right time, because he later found himself in an unfavorable environment in Japan and with manga readers not expecting sexual scenes in manga which are not explicitly labelled as erotic or pornographic. Shaenon K. Garrity of Anime News Network felt that the showing of pubic hair in the manga was "a sign of the changing times in Japanese publishing" because they used to be taboo.

== Release ==
The manga was launched in Ohta Publishing's magazine Manga Erotics F and was serialized from July 7, 2009, in the 58th issue to January 7, 2013, in the 77th issue. Ohta Publishing collected the 20 chapters into two volumes on March 17, 2011, and February 21, 2013. At Genericon 2015, Vertical announced that it had licensed the manga, publishing it as a single-volume omnibus edition on January 19, 2016. Due to its sexually explicit nature, the omnibus was sold shrink-wrapped. Kodansha USA released a hardcover edition of the manga with new cover art in February 2023.

The manga has also been released in France by Éditions IMHO, in Germany by Tokyopop Germany, in Spain by Milky Way Ediciones, in Italy by Panini Comics, in Taiwan by Taiwan Tohan, in Argentina by Editorial Ivrea. and in Brazil by JBC

== Film adaptation ==
A film adaptation, directed by Atsushi Ueda, was released on August 20, 2021. The film stars Ruka Ishikawa as Koume Sato, and Yuzu Aoki as Keisuke Isobe. World's End Girlfriend composed the background music.

== Reception ==
=== Manga ===
Rebecca Silverman of Anime News Network found the manga's depiction of adolescent relationships to be realistic and Asano's treatment of the characters respectful, saying that it "doesn't shy away from its emotional issues", concluding that the manga lingers in the mind after finishing it. Gabe Peralta of The Fandom Post said that the manga "is an emotional ride about emotionally broken children" which is accompanied by "beautiful visuals". Amanda Vail of Otaku USA praised Asano's art, calling it gorgeous and detailed, and said that its contrast with Koume and Keisuke's relationship forms a "poignant, almost painful ennui". Ash Brown of Manga Bookshelf called the manga's depictions of teenage sex "frank", but "integral to the story" because they "carr[y] meaning beyond titillation." He also called the manga "brutally unsettling and hard-hitting", concluding that its themes of loneliness and isolation are emphasized by Asano's "detailed backgrounds, dramatic perspectives, layout and use of space". Shea Hennum of The A.V. Club complimented the writing in its "ability to obtusely render complex relationships," saying that rather than descending into nihilism, Asano maintains a balance of melancholy and idealism. Hennum concludes that the manga is "buoyed by Asano's insightful observation of human emotion and his confrontational and beautiful rendering of it." Sean Rogers of The Globe and Mail compared the manga to the films Fat Girl and Kids in how it "deals explicitly and honestly with its young characters' sexuality", calling Asano's approach "raw and unblinking, but never salacious". He also called the protagonists' relationship "intense" and complimented the art's "expressive force". Elliot Page of the UK Anime Network podcast called the manga haunting and dense, saying that the manga "goes places with such care and respect and intellect into the characters and their plight". He also called the art gorgeous and complimented the backgrounds, comparing the way the manga creates a "pocket dimension" to The Flowers of Evil.

The manga was part of the Sélection Officielle at the 2016 Angoulême International Comics Festival.

=== Film ===
James Hadfield of The Japan Times felt that the film adaptation uncreatively used its source material as a storyboard, losing the emotions and atmosphere of the original. Hadfield also said that the scenes between the leads were unconvincing, concluding that the film "never rises to the challenge of its risky subject matter."
