= Spring Breeze Snegurochka =

Manga

春風のスネグラチカ (Harukaze no Sunegurachika)
- Manga
- Written by: Hiroaki Samura
- Published by: Ohta Publishing
- Magazine: Manga Erotics F
- Original run: May 2013 – May 2014

Spring Breeze Snegurochka (春風のスネグラチカ, Harukaze no Sunegurachika), also Harukaze no Snegurochka is a manga by Hiroaki Samura, serialized in Manga Erotics F (Ohta Publishing) from May 2013 to May 2014.

In November 2014 the manga received the Excellence Award in Manga Division at the 18th Japan Media Arts Festival.

== Plot ==
It is a story of a charming wheelchair girl nicknamed Bielka (means "squirrel" in Russian) and her attendant Shchenok (means "puppy" in Russian) taking place in the severe winter cold of Northern Russia of the emerging Soviet Union of 1933.
