= Tom Hurd =

Tom Hurd may refer to:

- Tom Hurd (baseball)
- Tom Hurd (civil servant)

== See also ==
- Thomas Hurd, officer of the Royal Navy
