= Mitsue Aoki =

Female Japanese manga artist (born 1969)

- Born: February 24, 1969 (age 57); Amagasaki, Hyogo, Japan
- Occupation: Manga artist
- Website: Aoki Mitsue Official Website

Mitsue Aoki (青木 光恵, Aoki Mitsue; born February 24, 1969) is a Japanese manga artist best known for the manga series Koume-chan ga Iku! (小梅ちゃんが行く!!, Here Comes Koume!!) which was adapted into a 12 episode anime series by the studio Gainax. Her works include short gag manga, story manga, yonkoma and essays.

== Works ==
- Aoki Tsushin (青木通信, The Aoki Report) (1993 Leed Publishing)
- Koume-chan ga Iku! (小梅ちゃんが行く！！, Here Comes Koume!) (1993-1996 Takeshobo)
- Wakakusa Gakuen Kotobu (若草学園高等部, Wakakusa Academy High School) (1994 Takeshobo)
- Chouhatsu Mugendai (挑発MUGENDAI, Infinite Provocation) (1994 Takebosho)
- Sasami sutoriito (ささみストリート, Sasami Street) (1994 Tokuma Shoten)
- Etchimono (えっちもの, Naughty Things) (1995 Bunkasha)
- Onna no Ko ga Suki (女の子が好き, I Like Girls) (1995 Bunkasha)
- Pasokon no Mitsuechan (ぱそこんのみつえちゃん, Mitsue at the PC) (1995 ASCII Media Works)
- Yamada-kun to Sono Tsuma-gimi (安田君とその妻君, Yamada and Wife) (1996 Takeshobo)
- Tonari no Shibafu wa (となりの芝生は, The Grass Is Greener) (1997 Shueisha)
- Kisekaegokko (きせかえっごっこ, Playing Dress-Up) (1997 Shueisha)
- Mitsuechan ga Iku!! (みつえちゃんが行く!!, Here Comes Mitsue!) (1997 Futabasha)
- Makoto The Speed Player Special (急戦法まことスペシャル, Kyuusenbou Makoto Supesharu) (1998 Shueisha) artist
- Hataraku Ojou-chan (はたらくお嬢ちゃん) (2000 Bunkasha)
- Tonari no Shibafu wa - Zoku (となりの芝生は 続) (2000 Shueisha)
- Koume-chan Ga Iku! R (小梅ちゃんが行く！！ R, Here Comes Koume ! R) (2000-2001 Takeshobo)
- Flower Shōnen (フラワー少年, Flower Boys) (2001 Asuka Shinsha)
- Sweet delicious (スウィート・デリシャス) (2001-2004 Shodensha)
- Neko Nekotai ga Iku!! (ねこねこ隊が行く!!) (2002–2004, serialized in Ultra Jump, Shueisha)
- Papaiya Gundan (パパイヤ軍団★) (2007–2008, serialized in Manga Erotics F, Ohta Publishing)
- Youjuu Mameshiba (幼獣マメシバ) (2009, serialized in Manga Kurabu Original, Takeshobo)
- Subete wa Moteru Tame de Aru (It's All For Being Attractive) artist
