= Happy-Go-Lucky Days =

Japanese manga series

- Cover of Happy-Go-Lucky Days volume 1 by Ohta Publishing

どうにかなる日々 (Dōnika Naru Hibi)
- Genre: Romance
- Manga
- Written by: Takako Shimura
- Published by: Ohta Publishing
- Magazine: Manga Erotics F
- Original run: 2002 – 2004
- Volumes: 2
- Anime film
- Directed by: Takuya Satō
- Produced by: Yūsuke Terada; Rie Miyai; Takefumi Kanari Masahito Nakatomi; Keisuke Satō
- Written by: Takuya Satō; Yoriko Tomita; Yasunori Ide
- Music by: CreepHyp
- Studio: Liden Films Kyoto Studio
- Licensed by: Sentai Filmworks
- Released: October 23, 2020
- Runtime: 54 minutes

Happy-Go-Lucky Days (どうにかなる日々, Dōnika Naru Hibi) is a Japanese manga series by Takako Shimura. It was serialized in Ohta Publishing's manga magazine Manga Erotics F from 2002 to 2004 and was collected in two large-sized tankōbon volumes. The manga is a collection of short episodes that depict slightly eccentric love stories and mundane daily life in a matter-of-fact manner with a unique tempo and delicate psychological descriptions. Most of the episodes in the collection have direct sexual depictions, although they are drawn in a light-hearted way. The manga's title comes from the book Herahera Botchan by Kō Machida.

An anime film adaptation produced by Liden Films Kyoto Studio and directed by Takuya Satō premiered on October 23, 2020.

== Plot ==
The storyline of Happy-Go-Lucky Days is told in four different segments: Happy, Go, Lucky, and Days.

== Characters ==
Ecchan (えっちゃん)
Voiced by: Kana Hanazawa
Aya (あやさん, Aya-san)
Voiced by: Mikako Komatsu
Mr. Sawa (澤先生, Sawa-sensei)
Voiced by: Takahiro Sakurai
Yagasaki (矢ヶ崎くん, Yagasaki-kun)
Voiced by: Seiichirō Yamashita
Shin (しんちゃん, Shin-chan)
Voiced by: Ibuki Kido
Mika (みかちゃん, Mika-chan)
Voiced by: Kaori Ishihara
Sayoko (小夜子)
Voiced by: Fairouz Ai
Yuri (百合)
Voiced by: Saori Hayami
Tanabe (田辺くん, Tanabe-kun)
Voiced by: Nobunaga Shimazaki
Yoriko (ヨリコさん, Yoriko-san)
Voiced by: Mutsumi Tamura
Shin's father (しんちゃん父, Shin-chan Chichi)
Voiced by: Kōhei Amasaki
Shin's mother (しんちゃん母, Shin-chan Haha)
Voiced by: Ryoko Shiraishi

== Media ==
=== Film ===
An animated film adaptation was announced on November 20, 2019. It is animated by Liden Films Kyoto Studio, distributed by Pony Canyon, and directed by Takuya Satō. Satō, Yasunori Ide, and Yoriko Tomita wrote the scripts, while Haruka Sagawa designing the characters. It was originally scheduled to premiere on May 8, 2020, but delayed to October 23 due to the COVID-19 pandemic. Asian Pop-up Cinema Festival streamed the film from September 15 to September 19, 2020. It has also been licensed by Sentai Filmworks.

==== Production ====
Although it has been almost 20 years since the manga's serialization, producer Yūsuke Terada thought that the "flat perspective on human relationships and love" of Shimura's work would be unique to today's age and planned the anime adaptation. While selecting the episodes, since the maximum length of the movie was decided in advance, the concept was set to "a story that reminds us of someone who is no longer around us, but who was once close to us." The four episodes that fit this concept were "Ecchan and Aya", "Mr. Sawa and Yagasaki", "Shin and Sayoko", and "Mika and Shin". In selecting the episodes, Shimura, the author of the original story, was consulted but had no objections because she liked the chosen episodes.

The main cast was chosen through a large audition, but Takahiro Sakurai and Seiichirō Yamashita were recommended by the director, Satō, who also served as sound director for the film. He demanded restrained acting and instructed the actors not to sigh. Mikako Komatsu, who played the role of Aya, said, "I was conscious of speaking clearly, but also of acting with realistic tension." Shimura also witnessed some of the recording process.

The theme song and the musical accompaniment was provided by the rock band CreepHyp. Initially, CreepHyp was only offered to compose background music for the film, but after reading the manga, Sekaikan Ozaki asked Terada if he could write a theme song as well. Shimura also knew CreepHyp from before and liked some of their songs. The theme song "Monomane" is also written for this film is a sequel to CreepHyp's previous song, "Boys End Girls". While creating the musical accompaniment, Ozaki did not decide on a scene and then write a song, but rather "just picked up a guitar and wrote songs that sounded like Happy-Go-Lucky Days, and then adjusted the scale of the finished songs to fit the necessary scenes." Terada said that this was a completely different way of creating the musical accompaniment to If My Favorite Pop Idol Made It to the Budokan, I Would Die, for which he had been the music producer prior to Happy-Go-Lucky Days.
