= Responses to the COVID-19 pandemic in January 2021 =

Aspect of viral disease pandemic

This article documents the chronology of the response to the COVID-19 pandemic in January 2021, which originated in Wuhan, China in December 2019. Some developments may become known or fully understood only in retrospect. Reporting on this pandemic began in December 2019.

== Reactions and measures in Africa ==
=== 7 January ===
- South African Minister of Health Zweli Mkhize announced that the country would be receiving one million doses of the vaccine developed by the University of Oxford and biotech firm AstraZeneca in January 2021 and another 500,000 in February 2021.

== Reactions and measures in the Americas ==
=== 5 January ===
- The Recording Academy announces that the 65th Annual Grammy Awards would be postponed from its original 31 January date to 14 March. The main festivities would be held without an audience outside the Los Angeles Convention Center while most of the performances were pre-taped or performed live amongst different stages set up inside Staples Center and the aforementioned convention center.

== Reactions and measures in Europe ==
=== 4 January ===
- British Prime Minister Boris Johnson has announced that England will enter into a seven-week lockdown with schools closing until February 2021 half-term in response to a spike in cases. All non-essential shops will close from the night of 4 January. The UK's Joint Biosecurity Centre has also raised the national alert level to five.
- Scottish First Minister Nicola Sturgeon has announced that mainland Scotland will enter into a full lockdown from midnight 4 January for the duration of January 2021.
- Welsh Education Minister Kirsty Williams has announced that all schools and colleges in Wales will move into online learning until 18 January 2021.
- The Northern Ireland Executive has announced an extended period of remote learning for all schools in Northern Ireland.

== Reactions and measures in South, Southeast and East Asia ==
=== 1 January ===
- Malaysian Senior Minister Dato Seri Ismail Sabri Yaakob announced that the country's Recovery Movement Control Order had been extended to 31 March 2021 as cases are still high.

=== 2 January ===
- India's Minister of Information and Broadcasting Prakash Javadekar announced the approval of AstraZeneca-Oxford's vaccine, which had been done the previous day. This makes the vaccine the first allowed for emergency use in India. In addition, three vaccine brands are being readied for approval in preparation for immunisation exercises.

=== 3 January ===
- India's Central Drugs Standard Control Organisation gives final approval of both AstraZeneca-Oxford's vaccine and Bharat Biotech's vaccine for emergency use.

=== 11 January ===
- The Malaysian Ministry of Health has ordered an additional 12.2 million doses of the Pfizer–BioNTech COVID-19 vaccine in response to rising cases and the tightening of lockdown measures.
- Malaysian Prime Minister Muhyiddin Yassin has reimposed movement control order restrictions on mobility, economic activities, and public gatherings in the states of Malacca, Johor, Penang, Selangor, Sabah and the federal territories of Kuala Lumpur, Putrajaya, and Labuan between 13 and 26 January 2021.

=== 12 January ===
- The Malaysian King Abdullah of Pahang declared a nationwide state of emergency until at least 1 August in response to the ongoing spread of COVID-19 and a political crisis. Under this state of emergency, parliament and elections will be suspended while the Malaysian Government will be empowered to introduce laws without parliamentary approval.

=== 21 January ===
- Malaysian Senior Defence Minister Ismail Sabri Yaakob announced that the Government would be allowing restaurants, food stalls and other food delivery services in states under the Malaysian movement control order to operate until 10pm starting 22 January.
- The Malaysian Government has extended the country's movement control order restrictions over the states of Selangor, Penang, Johor, Malacca, Sabah and the federal territories of Kuala Lumpur, Putrajaya and Labuan until 4 February.

=== 21 January ===
- Indians are reported to travel to the US for vaccine tourism.

=== 30 January ===
- Singapore has suspended its "travel bubble" arrangements with Malaysia, Germany, and South Korea in response to a global spike of cases and the emergence of new variants.

=== 31 January ===
- US Citizens are reported to travel across US states for vaccine tourism.

== Reactions and measures in the Western Pacific ==
=== 3 January ===
- New Zealand COVID-19 Response Minister Chris Hipkins has announced that travellers entering the country from the United Kingdom and United States will be required to take pre-departure tests before entering New Zealand from 15 January 2021.

=== 6 January ===
- New Zealand national carrier Air New Zealand announced that its first quarantine-free flight to Brisbane would depart from Auckland on 7 January 2021. Passengers traveling from New Zealand to Brisbane will not need to enter into quarantine if they fill out an Australian Travel Declaration saying they have been in New Zealand for 14 days.

=== 7 January ===
- Japanese Prime Minister Yoshihide Suga declared a state of emergency in the greater Tokyo area after Tokyo reported a record number of new COVID-19 infections.

=== 8 January ===
- Premier of Queensland Annastacia Palaszczuk has imposed a three-day lockdown on Greater Brisbane after the city reported its first community transmission in 113 days, which was linked to the highly infectious British strain.

=== 12 January ===
- New Zealand's COVID-19 Response Minister Chris Hipkins has announced that the Government will introduce new border protection changes requiring most international travelers with the exception of those from Australia, Antarctica and some Pacific Island states to produce a negative COVID-19 test before traveling to New Zealand.

=== 15 January ===
- New Zealand Prime Minister Jacinda Ardern announced the establishment of a one-way travel bubble for Cook Islanders traveling to New Zealand. However, these arrangements do not apply to New Zealanders seeking to travel to the Cook Islands, who will have to go into quarantine.

=== 19 January ===
- New Zealand COVID-19 Response Minister Chris Hipkins confirmed that most travelers with the exception of those coming from Australia, Antarctica, and most Pacific Island states including Fiji, Samoa, Tokelau, Tuvalu, and Vanuatu will need a pre-departure test from 26 January 2021.

=== 22 January ===
- Japan's former environment minister Nobuteru Ishihara was swiftly admitted to hospital after he tested positive for COVID-19 without showing symptoms. Meanwhile, at least 35,000 people were waiting for admission to hospital beds as hospitals were overwhelmed, and at least 25 people died while at home.

=== 25 January ===
- Australian Minister for Health Greg Hunt suspended the country's travel bubble with New Zealand for a period of 72 hours after New Zealand authorities confirmed a community transmission in the country's Northland Region.

=== 26 January ===
- New Zealand Prime Minister Jacinda Ardern has announced that New Zealand's borders would remain closed to most non-citizens and non-residents until New Zealand citizens have been vaccinated, a process that will not start until mid-2021.

=== 31 January ===
- Western Australia has entered into five day lockdown until 5 February after a quarantine hotel security guard at the Four Points by Sheraton in Perth tested positive for COVID-19. The reopening of schools will be delayed for another week.

== See also ==
- Timeline of the COVID-19 pandemic
