= Freesia (manga) =

Japanese manga series by Jiro Matsumoto

- First tankōbon volume cover, featuring Hiroshi Kanō

フリージア (Furījia)
- Genre: Action; Psychological thriller
- Manga
- Written by: Jiro Matsumoto
- Published by: Shogakukan
- Imprint: Ikki Comix
- Magazine: Monthly Ikki
- Original run: September 29, 2001 – August 25, 2009
- Volumes: 12
- Live-action film
- Directed by: Kazuyoshi Kumakiri
- Written by: Takashi Ujita
- Music by: Akainu
- Studio: Shogakukan; Toho; Bandai Visual; Sony PCL; Office Shirous
- Released: February 3, 2007
- Runtime: 103 minutes
- icon

Freesia (Japanese: フリージア, Hepburn: Furījia) is a Japanese manga series written and illustrated by Jiro Matsumoto. It was serialized in Shogakukan's seinen manga magazine Monthly Ikki between September 2001 and August 2009, with its chapters collected in 12 tankōbon volumes. A live-action film adaptation was released in February 2007.

== Plot ==
In alternate history Japan is engaged in protracted war and massive economic recession. Due to massive military spending, many prisons are shut and a Vengeance Act is created instead to allow those who have been hurt by convicted criminals to get revenge. Various Vengeance Proxy Enforcer firms are created to supply the massive demand for these.

== Characters ==
Hiroshi Kanō (叶ヒロシ, Kanō Hiroshi)
A mentally unstable former military assassin works as a Vengeance Proxy in an alternate-history Japan. He resides with his catatonic mother and girlfriend. His military training granted him a form of active camouflage, allowing him to evade detection and even phase through bullets. This ability is later revealed as a sophisticated manipulation of others' senses, creating convincing illusions of his presence. His psychological state deteriorates significantly; he begins compulsively repeating phrases from television, hears non-existent telephones and clocks, and holds conversations with the deceased.
Masaki Mizoguchi (溝口正樹, Mizoguchi Masaki)
A long-serving proxy at the same firm, Mizoguchi believes society is divided into lions, the hunters, and zebras, the prey. He joined the organization to freely hunt the "zebras" he considers everyone else, focusing particularly on his bizarre coworker, Kanō. Mizoguchi's abusive behavior towards his wife, whom he considered a zebra, contributes to her psychological decline and eventual suicide.
Ichirō Yamada (山田一郎, Yamada Ichirō)
A proxy hired alongside Kanō, he required three attempts to pass the firm's entrance exam, succeeding only by memorizing the entire manual while others received answer sheets. Initially optimistic about his new role, he becomes increasingly jaded upon discovering the grim reality behind the enforcement system.
Higuchi (ヒグチ)
A proxy scout for the firm, Higuchi secures contracts and handles the necessary paperwork for the association. She possesses extensive knowledge about her colleague, Kanō, and their histories are linked by a significant past event. Higuchi claims an intimate understanding of Kanō's behavior, asserting she can predict his every decision.

== Media ==
=== Manga ===
Freesia, written and illustrated by Jiro Matsumoto, was serialized in Shogakukan's Spirits Zōkan Ikki (later Monthly Ikki) from September 29, 2001, to August 25, 2009. Shogakukan collected its chapters in 12 tankōbon volumes, released from July 30, 2003, to November 30, 2009.

==== Volumes ====
No.	Japanese release date	Japanese ISBN
1	July 30, 2003	978-4-09-188381-0
2	July 30, 2003	978-4-09-188382-7
3	December 25, 2003	978-4-09-188383-4
4	June 30, 2004	978-4-09-188384-1
5	January 28, 2005	978-4-09-188385-8
6	September 30, 2005	978-4-09-188386-5
7	May 30, 2006	978-4-09-188317-9
8	January 1, 2007	978-4-09-188353-7
9	September 28, 2007	978-4-09-188376-6
10	June 30, 2008	978-4-09-188416-9
11	January 30, 2009	978-4-09-188438-1
12	November 30, 2009	978-4-09-188486-2

=== Film ===
A live-action film based on the manga was released on February 3, 2007, by Cine Quanon. It was directed by Kazuyoshi Kumakiri, written by Takashi Ujita, and starred Tetsuji Tamayama as Hiroshi.

== Reception ==
Freesia is Matsumoto's internationally best known work and although not officially translated into English it has been popular on the scanlation circuit.

Ryan Payton of 1UP.com described it as having "awesome art, intense stakeouts and firefights, and lots of psychoanalysis." Gavin J. Blair wrote for The Hollywood Reporter that it has elements that would attract a Hollywood adaptation and compared it to Purge.

The film adaptation received a four out five rating from The Japan Times's Mark Schilling.
