= Lychee Light Club =

Japanese horror manga series by Usamaru Furuya

- Cover of the Japanese release

ライチ☆光クラブ (Raichi☆Hikari Kurabu)
- Genre: Dark fantasy; Horror comedy
- Manga
- Written by: Usamaru Furuya
- Published by: Ohta Publishing
- English publisher: NA: Vertical
- Magazine: Manga Erotics F
- Original run: May 7, 2005 – May 3, 2006
- Volumes: 1
- Manga

Bokurano Hikari Club
- Written by: Usamaru Furuya
- Published by: Ohta Publishing
- Magazine: pocopoco
- Original run: April 15, 2011 – March 15, 2012
- Volumes: 2
- Anime television series

Litchi DE Hikari Club
- Directed by: Masahiro Takata
- Produced by: Chihiro Nagai
- Written by: Motoichi Adachi
- Music by: Hakuei
- Studio: Kachidoki Studio
- Original network: Tokyo MX
- Original run: October 2, 2012 – November 20, 2012
- Episodes: 8

Lychee Light Club (Japanese: ライチ☆光クラブ, Hepburn: Raichi☆Hikari Kurabu), also commonly known as Litchi Hikari Club, is a Japanese horror manga series written and illustrated by Usamaru Furuya and based on a play of the same name. It was serialized in Ohta Publishing's Manga Erotics F magazine between May 2005 and May 2006. A prequel to the original story, Our Light Club, was serialized in Ohta Publishing's online pocopoco magazine between April 2011 and March 2012.

A comedic anime adaptation aired between October and November 2012 on Tokyo MX. The series' visuals and style inspired the formation of a rock band in 2011. Four stage plays have also been performed, in 2012, 2013, 2015, and 2025, and a live-action film was released in 2016.

== Plot ==
The story centers around a nine-member club of middle school boys called the Light Club, in their endeavor to create a robot in order to abduct beautiful girls. As the club uses increasingly depraved methods to reach their goal, the original leader, Tamiya, tries to reclaim his position after he becomes unhappy with the way the new leader, Zera, runs the club.

== Publication ==
Written and illustrated by Usamaru Furuya, Lychee Light Club is loosely based upon a 1985 play of the same name directed by Norimizu Ameya for the theatrical group Tokyo Grand Guignol. It premiered in Ohta Publishing's Manga Erotics F magazine on May 7, 2005, and finished serialization on May 3, 2006. A single tankōbon volume was published by Ohta on June 21, 2006, and later digitally released on November 6, 2008. At the 2010 Comic-Con, Vertical announced that it had licensed it for an English-language translation in North America. Vertical published its paperback edition on April 26, 2011.

A prequel to the original story that unveils the past of the club members was announced in January 2011. Called Our Light Club (ぼくらの☆ひかりクラブ, Bokurano☆Hikari Kurabu), it was serialized in Ohta Publishing's online pocopoco magazine between April 15, 2011, and March 15, 2012. The first volume is referred to as Our Light Club Before: Grade Schoolers Volume (ぼくらの☆ひかりクラブ 上[小学生篇], Bokurano☆Hikari Kurabu Ue [Shōgakusei-hen]), while the second volume is referred to as Our Light Club After: Middle Schoolers Volume (ぼくらの☆ひかりクラブ 下[中学生編], Bokurano☆Hikari Kurabu Shita [Chūgakusei-hen]).

== Anime adaptation ==
In August 2012, the franchise official site announced an anime adaptation titled Litchi DE Hikari Club (ライチ DE 光クラブ) to premiere in October. Consisting of eight comedy shorts, it was broadcast on Tokyo MX from October 2 to November 20, 2012. It was directed by Masahiro Takata, screenplayed by Motoichi Adachi, and produced by Chihiro Nagai under Kachidoki Studio. A DVD compilation was released by Cammot on December 26, 2012. The series was made available online by Crunchyroll in the English-speaking regions of North America, the United Kingdom, Ireland, South Africa, Australia and New Zealand.

=== Episode list ===
No.	English title (Note: All English titles are taken from Crunchyroll.) Japanese title	Original air date
1	"Death Penalty IN the Light Club"; Transliteration: "Shokei DE Hikari Kurabu" (Japanese: 処刑DE光クラブ)	October 2, 2012
A man is caught in the facilities of the Light Club and their leader, Zera, suggests that Lychee kills him. However, Kanon prevents this to happen, only to later give the best proposal among the members. By forbidding him from "pleasing himself with a treat", the members consider it worse than execution.
2	"Modifications IN the Light Club"; Transliteration: "Kaizō DE Hikari Kurabu" (Japanese: 改造DE光クラブ)	October 9, 2012
As Lychee has fulfilled his mission by capturing Kanon, Zera wants to modify the robot so as to have it performing other functions. However, all the members suggestions—that vary from having him playing sports or as a car—are not useful.
3	"Patents IN the Light Club"; Transliteration: "Tokkyo DE Hikari Kurabu" (Japanese: 特許DE光クラブ)	October 16, 2012
Dentaku realizes that the fact that Lychee operates at lychee fruit is a very sustainable feature so he proposes that they patent its system to make money. To evaluate its market potential, he brings his uncle who works at a car manufacturer and its CEO but Lychee accidentally kills the CEO.
4	"Investigations IN the Light Club"; Transliteration: "Kenshō DE Hikari Kurabu" (Japanese: 検証DE光クラブ)	October 23, 2012
As most of the club members consider Kanon too beautiful to be subject to "treat", they want to investigate it. They order Lychee to abduct a girl to compare to Kanon but when she wakes up she is too scary to the boys, so Zera orders Lychee to release her.
5	"Band IN the Light Club"; Transliteration: "Gakudan DE Hikari Kurabu" (Japanese: 楽団DE光クラブ)	October 30, 2012
Zera says he wants to make a band to disseminate the Light Club ideas but the other members soon realize he is just trying to attract girls. In the end, they cannot agree on which instrument each one will be assigned to, and Hakuei appears and declares he will lead the band.
6	"Fuel IN the Light Club"; Transliteration: "Nenryō DE Hikari Kurabu" (Japanese: 燃料DE光クラブ)	November 6, 2012
Some members of the club wonder if Lychee really only runs at lychee fruit and then offer him a peach. As he accepts it, they give various other foods and eventually Lychee develops culinary skills.
7	"Beach IN the Light Club"; Transliteration: "Unabara DE Hikari Kurabu" (Japanese: 海原DE光クラブ)	November 13, 2012
As the black star symbol is necessary to "turn the world black", Zera creates beach products with the mark. He invites the members to disseminate it by going to beach but everyone is embarrassed with the products and no one except Zera appears on the marked location.
8	"Loyalty IN the Light Club"; Transliteration: "Chūsei DE Hikari Kurabu" (Japanese: 忠誠DE光クラブ)	November 20, 2012
Zera remembers that Nico gave his right eye to be Lychee's, and then requests to know what the other members are ready to offer as a sacrifice for the club. Even they only offer useless things, Zera is satisfied in the end to know they are committed to the club.

== Reception ==
Debora Aoki of About.com elected it the sixth most anticipated graphic novel to be published in 2011, writing it is a "compelling story like no other". During a 2011 panel at Comic-Con, Carlo Santos of Anime News Network elected it one of the best manga of the year, calling it "foul, disgusting, and wonderful".

== Legacy ==
=== Stage plays ===
In January 2011, a stage adaptation was announced, although the cast was only announced in August 2012. Directed and written by Junko Emoto, the play ran from December 14 to 25, 2012 at Kinokuniya Hall in Tokyo. A second adaptation was announced in September 2013 and kept most of the cast, except for Rin Honoka who was replaced by Aimi Satsukawa as Kanon. It was also directed and written by Emoto and ran at AiiA Theater Tokyo from December 16 to 24, 2013. Another play, this time directed by Masahiko Kawahara and written by Maruichirō Maruo, ran at 2.5 AiiA Theater Tokyo between December 18 and 27, 2015. The 2012–2013 run had Ryo Kimura as its protagonist, Zera, and Tomoya Nakamura took the role for the 2015 version. TC Entertainment released the first play in DVD format on April 26, 2013, while the 2015 play's DVD was released on April 27, 2016.

=== Band ===
Rock band Penicillin's vocalist Hakuei, who composed the music for the anime, created a musical act after the manga to express Lychee Light Club's world through music. "Haikyo no Teiō" (廃墟の☆帝王; lit. "The Emperor of Ruins") was the first song released by the group as both a standard ringtone and a full-length ringtone as a standard ringtone and full-length ringtone on January 1, 2011. This and five more songs were released in the mini album titled Elagabalus no Yume (エラガバルスの☆夢, Eragabarusu no☆Yume; lit. Elagabalus's Dream") on December 21, 2011. Their first live performance was at Tokyo Kinema Club on December 30, 2011, and it was released in DVD format on June 26, 2012, under the title of Haikyo no Oto Gakkai (廃墟の音樂会).

A split album containing six tracks performed along with the band Machine, Rendez-vous, was released on July 25, 2012. On December 12, 2012, they released their first full album, the eleven-track Grand Guignol (グランギニョル, Guran Ginyoru) and the compilation album -2011~2012 Complete Best- "Reimei" (-2011～2012 COMPLETE BEST-『黎明』). They performed again at Tokyo Kinema Club, this time along with Machine, on December 30, 2012, and its DVD, Haikyo no Kyōen: Aube (廃墟の狂宴 -aube-), was released on March 21, 2013.

A mini album, Hikari no Tei Kuni (光ノ帝國), was released on December 11, 2013, and was followed by a tour from December 25, 2013, to January 26, 2014. The first performance of this tour, at AiiA Theater Tokyo, was released into a live DVD on March 27, 2014. The release of the mini album titled Kikikaikai (奇奇怪怪) on August 13, 2014, led them to have a tour from August 24 to 30. On July 26, 2015, the band started a tour to promote the album Jesus Christ Hyperstar—released on July 29—that lasted until August 8.

=== Film adaptation ===
In April 2013, Ohta Publishing announced a live-action version of the manga had been green-lit. Only in July 2015, though, the main cast and staff, a trailer and a release date—Japan's winter—were revealed. It was directed by Eisuke Naitō, co-written by Naitō and Keisuke Tominaga and starred Shūhei Nomura as Tamiya and Yuki Furukawa as Zera. Produced by Marble Film and distributed by Nikkatsu, it premiered worldwide at the 20th Busan International Film Festival on October 2, 2015. Although its nationwide release was initially scheduled to be in January 2016, in November 2015 it was postponed to February 13, 2016, when the film was ultimately released.

Elizabeth Kerr of The Hollywood Reporter considered it to be "familiar territory of out-of-control, angry teens". If most performances "are there in service of the spectacular splatter", "capping to off" is Lychee, "its heart". What can be highlighted, in her opinion, is the art direction and production design; the film setting has cityscapes "that Philip K. Dick would be proud of". The music was compared to Tetsuo: The Iron Man and was said to be "a sometimes discordant soundtrack that adds to the overall atmosphere". The Japan Times critic Mark Schilling described it "as if the Marquis de Sade had penned Peter Pan" because of is horror elements. Indeed, "just when the film is becoming a mash-up of Beauty and the Beast and Pinocchio, with [Lychee] fulfilling his dream of love and manhood, twists multiply and the pace quickens. And we are abruptly reminded why the film's 'horror' label still applies." Schilling criticized the characters portrayal that seemed "more like manga archetypes than flesh-and-blood boys" and its good versus evil dichotomy calling it "as black-and-white as a folktale's (or a commercial manga's), making its surprises less than surprising — save perhaps for the last."
