= A White Rose in Bloom =

Japanese manga

- Cover of the first Japanese volume

メジロバナの咲く (Mejirobana no Saku)
- Genre: Drama, yuri
- Manga
- Written by: Asumiko Nakamura
- Published by: Hakusensha
- English publisher: NA: Seven Seas Entertainment
- Imprint: Rakuen Comics
- Magazine: Rakuen Le Paradis
- Original run: October 31, 2017 – present
- Volumes: 4

A White Rose in Bloom (メジロバナの咲く, Mejirobana no Saku) is a Japanese yuri manga written and illustrated by Asumiko Nakamura which has been serialized in Hakusensha's manga magazine Rakuen Le Paradis since October 2017.

== Plot ==
Ruby is a student at an elite European boarding school. Her year at school begins to unravel when her parents ask her not to come home for Christmas so they can attempt to mend their failing marriage. Ruby finds herself stuck at school with only one other student for company- Steph Nagy. While Steph remains aloof, Ruby slowly becomes more interested in the other girl.

== Characters ==
Ruby Canossa
A cheerful year eleven student, she struggles with her own lack of agency surrounding her parents' inevitable divorce. Ruby becomes interested in Steph after they spend the Christmas holidays at school.
Stephanie Nagy
A stand-offish year twelve student, her cool demeanour has gained her the nickname "Steel Steph", as well as a rumour that she has a metal prosthetic leg. Despite this she is still very popular among her peers.

== Publication ==
Written and illustrated by Asumiko Nakamura, A White Rose in Bloom began serialization in Hakusensha's Rakuen Le Paradis magazine on October 31, 2017. The manga is licensed in English by Seven Seas Entertainment.

No.	Original release date	Original ISBN	English release date	English ISBN
1	September 30, 2019	978-4-59271-156-8	January 5, 2021	978-1-64505-959-2
2	April 30, 2021	978-4-59271-184-1	February 22, 2022	978-1-64827-282-0
3	December 26, 2022	978-4-59271-214-5	August 20, 2024	979-8-88843-206-8
4	August 30, 2024	978-4-59271-244-2	June 3, 2025	979-8-89373-256-6

== Reception ==
The series was ranked 18th alongside Kageki Shojo!! and Namida Nikomi Ai Tsurasa Mashimashi in the 2020 edition of Takarajimasha's Kono Manga ga Sugoi! guidebook of best manga for female readers.

In Anime News Network gave the first volume an overall B grade, feeling that while the story lacked some forward progression, it largely made up for by "the skillful way in which Nakamura blends different traditions of girls' school stories, mixing the midnight feasts of British and American girls' literature with the strict hierarchy and crushes of Class S manga and novels." Erica Friedman of Yuricon praised the work, noting that the first volume was "a perfect blend of a classic Yuri at a private girls' school story with highlights of the modern world intruding at every turn."
