= Watching Fuckin' TV All Time Makes a Fool =

Japanese manga

- Cover to Watching Fuckin' TV All Time Makes a Fool.

テレビばかり見てると馬鹿になる (Terebi Bakari Miteruto Baka ni Naru)
- Genre: Anthology, H manga
- Manga
- Written by: Naoki Yamamoto
- Published by: Ohta Publishing
- Magazine: Manga Erotics; Manga F Weekly Manga Action
- Published: December 20, 2000
- Volumes: 1
- Live-action film
- Directed by: Toru Kamei
- Released: June 9, 2007
- Runtime: 85 minutes

Watching Fuckin' TV All Time Makes a Fool (テレビばかり見てると馬鹿になる, Terebi Bakari Miteruto Baka ni Naru; lit. Watching TV All the Time Makes You Stupid) is an erotic one-shot manga by Naoki Yamamoto. The story has been included in a manga volume of the same title, as well as the anthology I'll call you tomorrow. (明日また電話するよ, Ashita mata Denwa suruyo), both of which are anthologies of short, erotic one-shot manga by Yamamoto. The story has also been adapted into a film which was released in 2007.

== List of manga ==
The short manga that are present in the anthology are:

- "Nayamanai" (なやまない)
- "Hidoi Yatsura wa Minagoroshi" (ひどいやつらは皆殺し, "Their Terrible Massacre")
- "Hidoi Yatsura wa Minagoroshi 2" (ひどいやつらは皆殺し2, "Their Terrible Massacre 2")
- "Kisaku na Anoko" (きさくなあのこ)
- "Mikata" (「味方」, "Friend")
- "Benri na Doraibu" (便利なドライブ, "The Convenient Drive")
- "Oyogu" (泳ぐ, "Swimming")
- "Terebi Bakari Miteruto Baka ni Naru" (テレビばかり見てると馬鹿になる, "Watching TV All The Time Makes You Stupid")

== Cast ==
- Honoka
- Akifumi Miura
