= Genkaku Picasso =

Japanese manga series

- First tankōbon volume cover, featuring Hikari Hamura

幻覚ピカソ
- Genre: Supernatural
- Manga
- Written by: Usamaru Furuya
- Published by: Shueisha
- English publisher: AUS: Madman Entertainment; NA: Viz Media
- Imprint: Jump Comics SQ.
- Magazine: Jump Square
- English magazine: Shonen Jump (first chapter only)
- Original run: September 4, 2008 – April 3, 2010
- Volumes: 3
- icon

Genkaku Picasso (幻覚ピカソ; lit. 'Hallucinatory Picasso') is a Japanese manga series written and illustrated by Usamaru Furuya. It was serialized in Shueisha's shōnen manga magazine Jump Square from September 2008 to April 2010, with its chapters collected in three tankōbon volumes. The series was licensed for English release in North America by Viz Media and published under its Shonen Jump manga division.

== Plot ==
The protagonist is Hikari Hamura, a 17-year-old high school student known as "Picasso" because of his drawing ability. Hikari is an eccentric introvert with only one friend, Chiaki Yamamoto. One day while Hikari and Chiaki are at the river sketching, a malfunctioning helicopter crashes into their location, killing her, but leaving Hikari miraculously unscathed. After recovering from the accident, Hikari finds that Chiaki has been transformed into a miniature, winged version of herself, who lives in his pocket. Chiaki tells him that when the helicopter crashed she prayed for his survival, however in return for his life he must use his skills to draw people's "hearts", otherwise he will rot away. Although Hikari is reluctant to involve himself with others, he is persuaded by signs of rot on his arm to help his classmates. Each story deals with a different classmate (eight in total, with a ninth in the younger sister of one) with a personal problem; Hikari's drawings of the subject's "heart" manifest their psychological troubles as surreal allegories, and in order to help them with their issues Hikari and Chiaki must enter into the drawings to explore the classmate's psyche and figure out what the images mean.

== Publication ==
Genkaku Picasso, written and illustrated by Usamaru Furuya, who based the main character on himself, was serialized in Shueisha's shōnen manga magazine Jump Square from September 4, 2008, to April 3, 2010. Shueisha collected its chapters in three collected tankōbon volumes, published between February 4, 2009, and June 4, 2010.

Viz Media translated the series into English and published its three volumes under the Shonen Jump imprint from November 2, 2010, to May 3, 2011. On March 27, 2012, Viz Media made the series available in digital format on its VizManga.com website and Viz Manga App for iOS. The series was also published in English by Australian publisher Madman Entertainment.

== Reception ==
Genkaku Picasso was one of the four manga nominated by the Young Adult Library Services Association for its list of 2012 Great Graphic Novels for Teens; however, it was not entered into the final list.

Lissa Pattillo of Anime News Network (ANN) found the design and visual presentation of the first volume impressive, but worried that the plot will become repetitive. Chris Kirby of Mania.com also praised the art and the allegorical depictions of inner states in the first volume but felt that Hikari and Chiaki are underdeveloped and "merely act as plot devices". Ain't It Cool News' Scott Green praised Furuya's "skill at rendering the surreal and transgressive", but felt that the characters' problems in the first volume are unrealistic but not strange enough to add to the surrealist nature of the work.

Carlo Santos of ANN found the individual stories in the first volume gimmicky, but praised the different art-styles that Furuya uses and the series' surrealism and sense of humor; in his review of the second volume he continued to appreciate the art and the characters but found the stories "repetitive and trite". Santos nevertheless elected it one of the best manga published in the United States in 2011. Leroy Douresseaux concurred that the surreal drawings of the character's inner states are a highlight of the first volume; for the second volume he praised Furuya's "sharp" dialog and graphic storytelling.
