= Believers (manga) =

Japanese manga series

- First wideban volume cover

ビリーバーズ (Birībāzu)
- Manga
- Written by: Naoki Yamamoto
- Published by: Shogakukan
- Magazine: Weekly Big Comic Spirits
- Original run: May 24, 1999 – November 22, 1999
- Volumes: 2
- icon

Believers (Japanese: ビリーバーズ, Hepburn: Birībāzu) is a Japanese manga series written and illustrated by Naoki Yamamoto and is his first weekly serial manga created entirely without the help of any assistants. Believers was serialized in Shogakukan's seinen manga magazine Weekly Big Comic Spirits between May and November 1999 and published in two wideban volumes by Shogakukan. The plot to Believers revolves around themes of sexual desire and the line between dreams and reality.

== Plot summary ==
"Believers"^{[a]} is the word for members of the "Smiley Face Center", a cult organization with the goal of achieving purity of self and reaching "the land of comfort". Believers follows the events of three such people that have been left stranded on a deserted island off the coast of Japan. The three "believers" are referred to only by their rank and they practice various activities in an effort to purge their bodies from the perceived evils that society has subjected them to, such as lust and possession. But the "believers" are not able to resist their past temptations so easily, and the faith in their "organization" gradually weakens as the "believers" begin to question what is right and eventually what is even real.

== Characters ==
The main characters of Believers (left to right): The "Operator", the "Vice Chairman", and the "Chairman".

The Operator (オペレーター, Operētā)
Portrayed by: Hayato Isomura
The lowest ranking "believer" on the island. He learned of the "Smiley Face Center" through his mother, who was also a member. However, later, when the "Operator" was a member himself, his mother had had the effects of the brainwashing reversed and begged him to come back. The "Operator" refused to listen and chose to stay. The relationship between him and the "Vice Chairman" is a focal point of the manga, as he begins to find himself thinking forbidden, sexual thoughts about her.
The Chairman (議長, Gichō)
The highest ranking of the three "believers" on the island. He is a failed novelist but believes this is due to society rather than himself. Every night he has a continuing, epic dream that he can never remember upon awakening but believes that if he could reproduce his dream in print that he would be a best selling novelist. He rationalizes that this it is for the best that he is unable to; stating that if it wasn't for his inability to replicate his dreams, he would have never joined the "organization" and would have been stuck in the evil material world. He is slowly resented by the other two "believers" when, after having a fever due from food poisoning, he begins to act delusional and his sanity begins to come into question.
The Vice Chairman (副議長, Fukugichō)
The only female on the island and is the second highest ranking of the three. She was married to an abusive husband who accused her of adultery and hit her after she began to talk to a man referred to as the "3rd Division Chief". The "3rd Division Chief" then helped her leave her husband and join the "Smiley Face Center". She credits the "3rd Division Chief" for helping her denounce the filthy world and it is evident that grew to have feelings for him. She is the most doubtful "believer" in the group and often ends up going against the teachings.

== Inspirations ==
=== The Aum Shinrikyo and the Japanese Red Army ===
Naoki Yamamoto's first inspirations for Believers came after the Sarin gas attack on the Tokyo subway in 1995. The attack caused him to become interested in researching the Aum Shinrikyo, the terrorist group behind the attack. However, the Aum Shinrikyo had thus far kept their members quiet, leaving little research material. This led Yamamoto to instead read a book on the Japanese Red Army, a different Japanese terrorist group that has former members who have written about their past experiences. After reading the book, Yamamoto began to wonder what would happen if a group of fanatics who believed radical ideology were isolated together. This thinking would eventually lead to the creation of Believers.

=== The Second Sea Fortress ===
Example of landscape inspired by the Second Sea Fortress.

The setting for Believers was modeled on the Second Sea Fortress: a small, artificial island built off the coast of Tokyo Bay in the late 1910s. The island had been destroyed by the 1923 Great Kantō earthquake and had been relatively untouched in the 80 years that followed. It was this desolation that intrigued Yamamoto when he first discovered the island in the Big Comics magazine "100 Ruins". Yamamoto used his connections with Shogakukan to borrow the pictures for reference use. Later, about half-way through the series, Yamamoto had the opportunity to visit the Second Sea Fortress in person, along with a model and some staff. The nude photo shoot drew the attention of some passing fishboats and the entire crew ended up with sunburn. Many of the later landscape backgrounds of Believers were taken directly from the photos of that shoot.

== Media ==
=== Manga ===
Written and illustrated by Naoki Yamamoto, Believers was serialized in Shogakukan's seinen manga magazine Weekly Big Comic Spirits from May 24 to November 22, 1999. Shogakukan collected its chapters in two wideban volumes, released on December 18, 1999, and January 29, 2000. Fukkan.com re-released the series in two volumes on May 22 and June 23, 2012.

=== Live-action film ===
In February 2022, it was announced that manga would receive a live action film adaptation, directed by Hideo Jojo; it premiered on July 8 of that same year.

== Notes ==
a:All words with quotation marks are used intentionally, as they represent gibberish words "believers" use in their speech that must be translated into normal Japanese to read.
