= Ruka Ishikawa =

Japanese actress (born 1997)

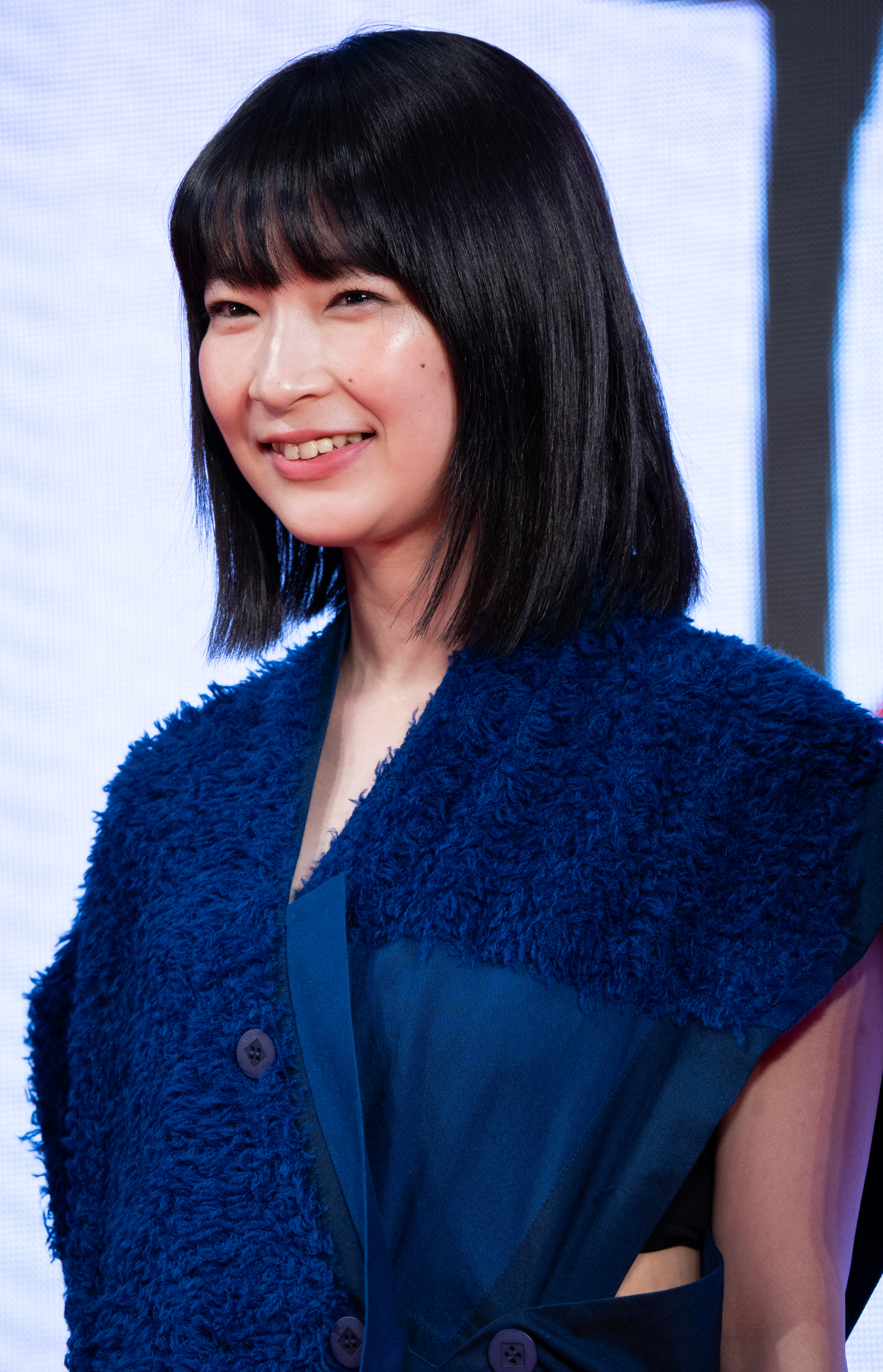
- Ishikawa in 2019
- Born: March 22, 1997 (age 29); Fujimino City, Saitama Prefecture, Japan
- Occupation: Actress
- Years active: 2017–present
- Agent: Sony Music Artists
- Notable work: A Girl on the Shore; Aesop's Game; Colorless

Japanese name
- Kanji: 石川 瑠華
- Hiragana: いしかわ るか
Transcriptions
- Romanization: Ishikawa Ruka

Ruka Ishikawa (石川 瑠華, Ishikawa Rūka; born March 22, 1997), is a Japanese actress.

== Filmography ==
=== Film ===
Year	Title	Role	Notes	Ref.
2019	Horror Doll	Madoka		
2019	Beat Per Mizu	Sumiko	Lead role; short film	
2019	Where Hope Goes	Nanako Sasaki	Lead role	
2019	Aesop's Game	Miu Kameda	Lead role	
2019	If That's The Case	Miyu Matsui		
2020	13th Month Girl	Honoka Okuzawa		
2021	Colorless	Yuka Tanaka	Lead role	
2021	A Girl on the Shore	Koume Sato	Lead role	
2023	Qualia	Saki Watanabe		
2023	Ichiko	Fuyuko Kitami		
2023	Dark Country: A Man with a Split Personality	Hana Satake		
2024	The Crescent Moon with Cats	Tsugumi Ushimaru		
2024	The Brightest Star Shines Far Away		Short film	
2024	Rain and Light	Mio Amemiya		
2025	Breathing Underwater	Aoi Asahina	Lead role	
2025	Can't Cry with Your Face			
2027	Goodnight	Miki	Lead role	

=== Television ===
Year	Title	Role	Notes	Ref.
2019	Spectacular Detective	Motomura/Hana		
2020	13	Chiho Aikawa		
2020	Spotlight	Ayumi	Episode 8	
2021	Scream in the Rain	Sachiko Kamino	Web series	
2021	I Want to Say I Love You	Miku Morita		
2022	Van Gogh Under the Stairs	Hana Takao		
2022	I Just Want to Watch You	Riko Yoshimura	Web series	
2023	My Sly Bestie	Ai Honda		
2023	Ah, Love Hotel: Secret	Aoi Kitano	Lead role; season 2	
2023	Dogs and trash	Yoshiko Kamoshita		
2023	This hamburger, Forget The Pickles	Aki		
2024	Ripe for the Picking	Ren Kodaira		
2024	I Am...	Mari Okajima	Lead role; web series	
2024	Buntman	Kyoko Kajima		
2024	Kamen Rider Gavv	Emi Toritani	Episodes 11 and 12	
2024	My Own Iris	Yuka	Episode 2	
2025	Sins of Kujo	Shizuku Kasagi		
2025	A Summer Accomplice	Mona Chigusa		
2026	The Art of Drinking Evenings	Kaede Toshiro	Season 5	
2026	Mame To Mugi	Ruri Amagai		
2026	Reunion at the Shared Office	Chitoshi Yamamoto	Web series	
