= Tales of the Kingdom =

Japanese manga series

- First tankōbon volume cover

王国物語 (Ōkoku Monogatari)
- Genre: Fantasy
- Manga
- Written by: Asumiko Nakamura
- Published by: Shueisha
- English publisher: NA: Yen Press
- Imprint: Young Jump Comics
- Magazine: Ultra Jump
- Original run: April 19, 2017 – November 19, 2025
- Volumes: 6

Tales of the Kingdom (王国物語, Ōkoku Monogatari) is a Japanese manga series written and illustrated by Asumiko Nakamura. It was serialized in Shueisha's seinen manga magazine Ultra Jump from April 2017 to November 2025.

== Publication ==
Written and illustrated by Asumiko Nakamura, Tales of the Kingdom began serialization in Shueisha's seinen manga magazine Ultra Jump on April 19, 2017. In January 2025, it was announced that series would be entering its final arc. The series' final chapter was released on November 19, 2025. Its chapters were collected in six tankōbon volumes released from July 19, 2018, to December 18, 2025. The series is licensed in English by Yen Press.

=== Volumes ===
No.	Original release date	Original ISBN	North American release date	North American ISBN
1	July 19, 2018	978-4-08-891029-1	August 9, 2022	978-1-9753-4586-0
1. "Adolte and Adalte"; 2. "Adalte and Adolte"; 3. "The King and His Aide 1"; 4. "The King and His Aide 2"; 5. "The King and His Aide 3"; 6. "Shao and Dao 1"
2	July 19, 2019	978-4-08-891327-8	December 13, 2022	978-1-9753-4588-4
7. "Shao and Dao 2"; 8. "Shao and Dao 3"; 9. "Shao and Dao 4"; 10. "Shao and Dao 5"; 11. "The King and His Aide 4"; 12. "The King and His Aide 5"
3	January 19, 2021	978-4-08-891760-3	April 18, 2023	978-1-9753-4590-7
13. "The King and His Aide 6"; 14. "The King and His Aide 7"; 15. "The King and His Little Brother 1"; 16. "The King and His Little Brother 2"; 17. "The King and His Little Brother 3"; 18. "The King and His Little Brother 4"
4	July 19, 2022	978-4-08-892382-6	February 20, 2024	978-1-9753-6810-4
19. "The King and His Little Brother 5"; 20. "The King and His Little Brother 6"; 21. "The King and His Little Brother 7"; 22. "The King and His Little Brother 8"; 23. "The King and His Little Brother 9"; 24. "The King and His Aide 8"
5	January 18, 2024	978-4-08-893088-6	September 17, 2024	979-8-8554-0361-9
25. "The King and His Queen 1"; 26. "The King and His Queen 2"; 27. "The King and His Queen 3"; 28. "The King and His Queen 4"; 29. "The King and His Queen 5"; 30. "The King and His Queen 6"
6	December 18, 2025	978-4-08-894032-8	February 23, 2027	979-8-8554-4716-3
