= JBC =

JBC may refer to:

== Organizations ==
=== Education ===
- John Bosco College, Philippines
- Johnson Bible College, Tennessee, US
- Jamestown Business College, New York, US

=== Media ===
- Editora JBC (Japan Brazil Communication), a Brazilian publisher
- Jamaica Broadcasting Corporation, a public broadcasting company
- Japan Broadcasting Corporation
- JBC, a Korean-language radio station in Los Angeles, California, see KYPA

=== Sport ===
- Japan Bowling Congress, the major sanctioning body for bowling in Japan
- Japan Boxing Commission
- Jelly Belly-Kenda, UCI Code JBC, Jelly Belly Cycling Team, an elite men's cycling team

=== Other organizations ===
- Jiban Bima Corporation, the state-run life insurance company of Bangladesh
- Judicial and Bar Council, a body that makes recommendations to fill judicial vacancies in the Philippines
- Joint Biosecurity Centre, UK government scientific body responding to COVID-19 outbreaks

== Science, technology, and computers ==
- JBoss Cache, a component of JBoss Middleware that caches frequently accessed Java objects to improve application performance
- Journal of Biological Chemistry, a publication of The American Society for Biochemistry and Molecular Biology
- Jinbei (car), a car brand name of Brilliance Jinbei Automobile Co., Ltd.

== Other uses ==
- Jeremy Kennedy (born 1992), Canadian mixed martial artist nicknamed JBC
