= Utsubora =

Japanese manga series

- Utsubora: The Story of a Novelist
- Cover of the first volume

ウツボラ (Utsubora)
- Genre: Drama; Mystery
- Manga
- Written by: Asumiko Nakamura
- Published by: Ohta Publishing
- English publisher: NA: Vertical
- Magazine: Manga Erotics F
- Original run: November 6, 2008 – March 6, 2012
- Volumes: 2
- Television drama
- Directed by: Hiroto Hara
- Written by: Kazuhisa Kodera; Kiko Inoue
- Music by: Yūji Iwamoto
- Original network: Wowow
- Original run: March 24, 2023 – May 12, 2023
- Episodes: 8
- icon

Utsubora: The Story of a Novelist (Japanese: ウツボラ, Hepburn: Utsubora) (Note: Utsubora is an archaic Japanese word meaning 'hollow space'.) is a Japanese manga series written and illustrated by Asumiko Nakamura. It was serialized in Ohta Publishing's Manga Erotics F magazine from November 2008 to March 2012, with its individual chapters being collected into two volumes. A live-action television drama adaptation was aired on Wowow from March to May 2023.

== Media ==
=== Manga ===
Written and illustrated by Asumiko Nakamura, the series began serialization in Ohta Publishing's Manga Erotics F magazine on November 6, 2008. The series was on hiatus from July 7, 2010, to September 6, 2011, due to Nakamura's health. The series finished its serialization on March 6, 2012. The series' individual chapters were collected into two tankōbon volumes.

In September 2012, Vertical announced that they licensed the series for English publication. They released both volumes in a one-volume omnibus edition.

==== Volumes ====
No.	Original release date	Original ISBN	English release date	English ISBN
1	June 10, 2010	978-4-77-832113-0	June 18, 2013	978-1-93-565476-6
2	May 17, 2012	978-4-77-832164-2	June 18, 2013	978-1-93-565476-6

=== TV drama ===
A live-action television drama adaptation was announced in March 2022. It was directed by Hiroto Hara, with scripts by Kazuhisa Kodera and Kiko Inoue and Yūji Iwamoto composing the music. It starred Atsuko Maeda. It was aired on Wowow from March 24 to May 12, 2023, for a total of eight episodes.

== Reception ==
Carlo Santos of Anime News Network praised the artwork and character designs. He also praised the story, though noting that "the ... details are kind of fuzzy in places". Comics Worth Reading praised the story's exploration of creativity and narrative unreliability. Sean Gaffney of A Case Suitable for Treatment praised the story and character development. He also described it as "one of the best titles I've read this year". Manga critic Deb Aoki recommended the series at San Diego Comic-Con in 2013.

In the 2013 edition of the Kono Manga ga Sugoi! guidebook, the series ranked 13th on the list of the top manga for female readers. The series was nominated for the Eisner Award for Best U.S. Edition of International Material—Asia in 2014.
