= 51 Ways to Save Her =

Japanese manga series

- Cover of volume 1.

彼女を守る51の方法 (Kanojo wo Mamoru 51 no Hōhō)
- Manga
- Written by: Usamaru Furuya
- Published by: Shinchosha
- Magazine: Comic Bunch
- Original run: May 26, 2006 – August 17, 2007
- Volumes: 5

51 Ways to Save Her (彼女を守る51の方法, Kanojo wo Mamoru 51 no Hōhō) is a Japanese seinen manga series written and illustrated by Usamaru Furuya. It was serialized in Shinchosha's Comic Bunch magazine between May 26, 2006, and August 17, 2007, finishing at five volumes. CMX purchased the English rights but never released it due to the imprint's cancellation. It was released in French by Marvel Panini France (retitled as Tokyo Magnitude 8), and in Chinese by Tong Li Publishing.

Though the title of the French release is nearly identical to the anime series Tokyo Magnitude 8.0 and the latter lists 51 Ways to Save Her as a reference for the anime, the stories are dissimilar other than the basic concept of people surviving a large earthquake in Tokyo.

== Synopsis ==
While looking for a job at a TV station in Odaiba, college senior Jin Mishima encounters his former classmate Nanako Okano, dressed in gothic Lolita, who tries to attend a concert but finds out that her friends tricked her about the concert ticket out of jealousy. Jin and Nanako bump into each other and are reunited—previously being junior high classmates—moments before an earthquake of Richter Scale 8.1 turns the island, as well as the entire Tokyo metropolitan area, into ruins.

== Characters ==
Jin Mishima
A college senior looking for a job at a famous TV station. He regrets not trying to protect Nanako when she had been bullied in junior high.
Nanako Okano
A naive and dense girl; due to bullying in junior high she started to dress in gothic Lolita style and fell in love with gothic rock. Since junior high she has had a crush on Jin and doesn't blame him for his reluctance to protect her when she had been bullied.
Rika Sawada
Rika is a girl who decides to join Jin and Nanako on their journey to a safer place after the earthquake's occurrence. After some time she runs into her childhood friend and leaves the group. In the end she becomes a stronger woman and marries her friend.
