= Nokemono to Hanayome =

Japanese serial novel and manga

- Cover of the first volume of the manga series

ノケモノと花嫁 (The Outcast and His Bride)
- Genre: Drama, supernatural
- Created by: Kunihiko Ikuhara
- Serial novel
- Written by: Kunihiko Ikuhara
- Published by: Index Communications
- Magazine: Kera
- Original run: February 2006 – September 2007
- Manga
- Written by: Kunihiko Ikuhara
- Illustrated by: Asumiko Nakamura
- Published by: Index Communications
- Magazine: Kera
- Original run: August 16, 2007 – June 2017
- Volumes: 5
- Manga

Nokemono to Hanayome+
- Written by: Kunihiko Ikuhara
- Illustrated by: Asumiko Nakamura
- Published by: Gentosha
- Magazine: Denshi Birz; Comic Boost
- Original run: August 31, 2018 – April 3, 2020
- Volumes: 3

Nokemono to Hanayome (Japanese: ノケモノと花嫁; lit. "The Outcast and His Bride") is a Japanese serial novel and manga written by Kunihiko Ikuhara. The serial novel was published in the teenage fashion magazine Kera from 2006 to 2007 as "Part 1", while a manga written by Ikuhara and illustrated Asumiko Nakamura was published from 2007 to 2017 as "Part 2". A sequel manga series, Nokemono to Hanayome+ (ノケモノと花嫁|+, "+" pronounced "cross"), was serialized on the digital distribution platform Comic Boost from 2018 to 2020.

== Synopsis ==
Described by publisher Comic Boost as a "lolita hardboiled" series, Nokemono to Hanayome is set in a world ruled by the "Moeru Kirin", a group of teenagers who dress in animal costumes. The series follows the relationship between Hitsuji Sera, the series' titular bride, and Itaru Hagumazuka, a boy who wears a bear costume.

== Development ==
Ikuhara developed a pitch for an anime adaptation of Nokemono to Hanayome from 2005 to 2006. The adaptation, titled Nokemono to Hanayome+, would ultimately not transpire, with Ikuhara opting to instead publish the story as a sequel manga in 2018. The series is regarded as a precursor to several of Ikuhara's later anime series, with animal costume elements from Nokemono to Hanayome appearing in Yurikuma Arashi; Nokemono to Hanayome is also inspired by the Tokyo subway sarin attack, which appears as a central plot element in Ikuhara's Penguindrum.

== Media ==
Nokemono to Hanayome was published in the fashion magazine Kera as a serial novel from 2006 to 2007, and as a manga from 2007 to 2017. Beginning in 2018, the sequel series Nokemono to Hanayome+ began serialization on the digital distribution platform Denshi Birz (renamed Comic Boost in 2019), with new chapters published every other month. The series concluded in April 2020.

The manga series has been collected into eight tankōbon volumes, with the first three volumes published by Index Communications, volumes four and five published by Mall of TV, and volumes six to eight published by Gentosha Comics.

No.	Release date	ISBN
1	December 14, 2010	978-4757305984
2	June 25, 2011	978-4757306066
3	June 20, 2012	978-4757306073
4	December 10, 2014	978-4908158018
5	May 20, 2016	978-4908158087
6	January 25, 2018	978-4344841451
7	April 26, 2018	978-4344842229
8	September 16, 2020	978-4344847187
