= Since I Could Die Tomorrow =

Japanese manga series

- First wideban volume cover

あした死ぬには、 (Ashita Shinu ni wa)
- Manga
- Written by: Sumako Kari
- Published by: Ohta Publishing
- English publisher: NA: Tokyopop
- Magazine: Ohta Web Comic
- Original run: March 28, 2018 – July 28, 2022
- Volumes: 4

Since I Could Die Tomorrow (あした死ぬには、, Ashita Shinu ni wa) is a Japanese manga series written and illustrated by Sumako Kari. It was serialized on Ohta Publishing's Ohta Web Comic website from March 2018 to July 2022.

== Synopsis ==
The series is centered around Sawako Honna, a woman in her 40s suffering from problems associated with that age, including but not limited to sudden illness, fatigue, aging, and menopause.

== Publication ==
Written and illustrated by Sumako Kari, Since I Could Die Tomorrow was serialized on Ohta Publishing's Ohta Web Comic website from March 28, 2018, to July 28, 2022. Its chapters were collected into four wideban volumes released from June 13, 2019, to October 14, 2022. The series is licensed in English by Tokyopop.

No.	Original release date	Original ISBN	North American release date	North American ISBN
1	June 13, 2019	978-4-7783-2301-1	February 6, 2024	978-1-4278-7527-3
Chapters 1–5; Bonus
2	January 17, 2020	978-4-7783-2304-2	April 2, 2024	978-1-4278-7543-3
Chapters 6–11; Bonus
3	March 12, 2021	978-4-7783-2309-7	June 4, 2024	978-1-4278-7554-9
Chapters 12–16; Bonus
4	October 14, 2022	978-4-7783-2316-5	August 6, 2024	978-1-4278-7727-7
Chapters 17–21

== Reception ==
The series was ranked third in the 2020 edition of Takarajimasha's Kono Manga ga Sugoi! guidebook's list of best manga for female readers. The series won an Excellence Award at the 23rd Japan Media Arts Festival. The series was nominated for the 13th Manga Taishō and was ranked twelfth.
