= Velveteen & Mandala =

Japanese manga series

- Cover of the Japanese tankōbon

べっちんとまんだら (Becchin to Mandara)
- Genre: Dystopia
- Manga
- Written by: Jiro Matsumoto
- Published by: Ohta Publishing
- English publisher: NA: Vertical
- Magazine: Manga Erotics F
- Original run: June 2007 – October 2009
- Volumes: 1

Velveteen & Mandala (Japanese: べっちんとまんだら, Hepburn: Becchin to Mandara) is a Japanese manga written and illustrated by Jiro Matsumoto. Originally published as a Japanese-language series starting in 2007, this manga was later compiled into a Japanese-language Tankōbon, and subsequently was published in 2011 as an English-language paperback graphic novel.

== Plot ==
Velveteen & Mandala takes place in a dystopian Tokyo that is in the midst of a war. The story focuses on the high school students Velveteen, who lives in a battle tank on a riverbed in Tokyo's Suginami ward, and her frenemy Mandala. After a large air raid, zombies start to fall from the sky, and the girls get involved in exterminating the zombies in the dry riverbed area. Although they have to fight the zombies, most of conflict is between them as they are both deeply disturbed.

== Release ==
A seinen manga, Velveteen & Mandala first appeared as a serial from June 2007 and October 2009 in Ohta Publishing's Manga Erotics F magazine. The 14 chapters of the series were compiled into a single tankōbon released by Ohta Publishing on November 26, 2009. In the following year, at the Anime Weekend Atlanta, Vertical announced that it had licensed the manga for an English-language translation in North America. Vertical's representative Ioannis Mentzas said the series was chosen among other Matsumoto's title on the basis that it had not been scanlated. Vertical released the manga on August 30, 2011.

== Reception ==
Carlo Santos of Anime News Network praised the series for its visuals, but criticized its plot and some "tasteless displays". He wrote, "the bizarre imagery, where Matsumoto crosses all lines of good taste and common sense, is what makes it stick. [...] Yet Matsumoto's sketchy lines are just as capable of lush riverbank landscapes and slick action shots, and when that beauty meets the ugliness of the story, that's when the artist's unique vision fully takes hold." However, he declared, "Story-wise, Velveteen and Mandala is in serious need of some editing and rethinking" and that "those stomach-churning scenes" do not "really add a point to the story, aside from being a shocking moment". Katherine Dacey of Manga Bookshelf also praised the artwork, calling it "scratchy and energetic" and praising the "superbly animated" characters' faces. However, she was very critical of his use of "sexual violence to titillate and shock the reader", especially seen in a gang rape scene. She concluded, "it's never clear if Matsumoto has a greater point to make, as the manga lacks any overarching sense of narrative direction or social commentary."

Shaenon K. Garrity wrote for About.com that "this may be the screwed-up manga of your dreams" or a work that should be avoided depending on one's tates. Although it features "disturbing adult material", she stated, "His teen-girl protagonists are sexualized in a way that's so casual it's strangely inoffensive". Garrity praised its "vibrantly sketchy art" and its "original take on zombie horror". In her words, "Matsumoto twists the raw material of a straightforward zombie horror romp into a trippy, Donnie Darko-like plunge into the psychic darkness, peppering it with dark humor". Joseph Luster of Otaku USA praised how it "manages to be both fun and sad", affirming "Velveteen & Mandala will stay in your head and beg to be reread". He said it is sexual but "not titillating"; it is "a 'gross-out' book that plays with the reader, creaking open the door to hint at something more before slamming it shut on the reader's fingers and gleefully scooting along to more head-popping and scat humor." David Brothers of ComicsAlliance said, "Velveteen & Mandala is a funny, touching, scary, violent, and deeply uncomfortable comic" and that "the exact manga you need if you're a fan of Johnny Ryan's Prison Pit, Charles Burns's Black Hole, or seeing some good old-fashioned gross action."
