= Genericon =

Multi-genre convention held in Troy, NY

- Status: Defunct
- Genre: Multi-genre
- Venue: Rensselaer Polytechnic Institute
- Location: Troy, New York
- Country: United States
- Inaugurated: 1985
- Website: http://genericon.org/

ID badge buttons for Genericons 1 - 3

Genericon was a modestly sized anime/science fiction/gaming convention held in Troy, New York on the Rensselaer Polytechnic Institute (RPI) campus for over 30 years, making it reportedly the longest-running college multigenre convention in the nation. It hosted theater-style auditoriums and had 24-hour anime viewing rooms, karaoke, cosplay events, 24-hour video game room/competitions, role-playing games, board games, and talks by guest speakers. The events usually began 6 p.m. on the Friday of the first weekend of March and continued until Sunday at 6 p.m. with a closing ceremony and announcement of the new "Con Chair". Starting with Genericon XXI, convention staff partnered with Jazzman's Cafe, located in the middle of the convention itself, to bring food and beverages to the convention.

== History ==
Genericon began in 1985 as a general science fiction convention, organized by the Rensselaer Science Fiction Association, a student group at RPI. Early conventions were held in the lecture halls of RPI's Russell Sage Laboratory. They featured standard SF convention activities such as lectures and panels, film rooms, a dealers' room, an art show, and filking. Guests of Honor at Genericon 1 were writer Hal Clement, artist Phil Foglio, and fan Jan "Wombat" Finder. Other guests included Leik Myrabo, Lynn Abbey, Fred Saberhagen, and Professor Alan Meltzer. Subsequent Genericons have included such notable guests as Samuel R. Delany (Genericon II), Joan Vinge (Genericon III), Jack Dann (Genericon III), Barry Longyear (Genericon VII), Christopher Golden (Genericon IX), Vic Mignogna (Genericon XXIV), and Kyle Hebert (GenericonXXVI), Studio Trigger (Genericon XXX and XXXI).

Since its founding, Genericon has been held every year, except 1993-1995, as the entirety of the staff had graduated in the year of Genericon VIII. In recent years, since Genericon X in 1997, the con has gravitated away from its sci-fi roots towards a focus on webcomics, video gaming, and anime, though cosplay and other standard gaming has remained somewhat popular. This is most evident in the fact that guests invited to more recent Genericons have been more from the webcomic industry, including Pete Abrams (Sluggy Freelance), Jeffrey T. Darlington (General Protection Fault, Genericon XV), R. K. Milholland (Something Positive, Genericon XVII), Jeph Jacques (Questionable Content, Genericon XIX and XX), Mohammad Haque (Applegeeks, Genericon XX), and Ananth Hirsh (then Panagariya; Applegeeks, Genericon XX).

In 2010, Genericon XXIV introduced a new "Featured Panelist" system, wherein the convention staff selected a group of panelists deemed to be "experts in their field (i.e. popular journalists, podcasters, or industry professionals)." The list featured a number of anime bloggers and journalists, as well as a group of RPI alumni who frequently run panels at the convention.

Two new events, Cosplay Ball and Cosplay Cafe, were introduced in 2018 for Genericon XXXI.

Genericon XXIV's official attendee count was 1351.

By Genericon XXVI the number has climbed to over 2000.

== Annual activities ==
Every year the following were usually the highlighted events:

- Eye Of Argon: A famously poorly written story poorly thus reserved to play at 1 a.m.
- "Clay-O-Rama": A RPG with Play-Doh sculptures
- Artists Alley/Auction: A room showing submitted work that was also available for sale.
- Video games: Everything from Atari to Xbox 360 open 24 hours a day
- Magic: The Gathering tournaments and casual play
- Vendors: Selling various imports and local products
- 24-hour anime rooms : Anime was run throughout the entirety of the convention in at least 1 of the 3 viewing rooms.
- Board gaming: Held in the Great Hall of the DCC, a wide variety of board gaming was offered.
- RPGs: Held in various conference rooms of the neighboring Low building, a wide variety of table-top role-playing sessions were offered spanning mainstream and indie games.
- Guest panels
- Cosplay Contest & Masquerade
- Cosplay Chess
- Cosplay Death Match
- Cosplay Dating Game
- Genericon Dance/Rave
- Karaoke
- Anime music videos Contest (as of Genericon XX)

== Problems and issues ==
Sleeping on the convention space was a problem, since RPI does not allow loiterers. People have been woken up by staff and told to move, or leave campus to sleep elsewhere.

Challenges occurred during the MS Paint panel, wherein individual participants have used the panel to display crudely drawn and crude-in-nature images. Despite the panel being 18+, a rule was implemented requiring non-graphic images to be displayed.

R. K. Milholland expressed a dislike for the con following his attendance as a guest in 2004. Other webcomic artists, however, claimed to have enjoyed the con in their visits, including Jeffrey T. Darlington, Jeph Jacques and Ananth Hirsh.
