= Shūkan Post =

Japanese magazine

- Categories: General-interest
- Frequency: Weekly
- Circulation: 241,625 (printing-certified)
- Publisher: Shogakukan
- Founded: August 22, 1969; 57 years ago
- First issue: August 22, 1969; 57 years ago
- Company: Shogakukan
- Country: Japan
- Based in: Tokyo
- Language: Japanese
- Website: www.news-postseven.com

Shūkan Post (Japanese: 週刊ポスト, Hepburn: Shūkan Posuto) (or Weekly Post) is a Japanese weekly general-interest magazine published by Shogakukan. It was founded on August 22, 1969, succeeding the boys' magazine Boy's Life, and is sold on Mondays in a B5, center-stapled format. It is one of Japan's longest-running general weekly magazines aimed at a male readership.

== History ==
Shogakukan launched Shūkan Post on August 22, 1969, the same year its boys' magazine Boy's Life, which had been published since April 1963, ceased with its August issue; Shogakukan's National Diet Library catalog records show the two titles in direct succession. The magazine was one of roughly a dozen publishing-house weeklies launched in the 1950s and 1960s that competed with the newspaper-sponsored weeklies. In the 1990s Shūkan Post and the rival Shūkan Gendai presented uncensored nude photographs, pushing their circulations above one million copies; national sales of general weeklies peaked around 1995.

Like most Japanese weeklies, Shūkan Post's circulation has declined. According to the media critic Kiyoshi Hanada the Japan Audit Bureau of Circulations (JABI) reported sold copies of about 306,010 for the first half of 2008 and 297,120 for the second, placing the magazine third among the country's general weeklies. By the first half of 2022 JABI reported Shūkan Post sold 130,595 copies, fourth among the ten general weeklies it tracked, down about 31 percent from the first half of 2019 and about 54 percent from the first half of 2012.

== Profile ==
Shogakukan's media guide describes Shūkan Post as publishing "scoops" that "newspapers and television do not report", covering politics, economics, incidents, entertainment, sports, health and money for an "active middle-aged to senior" male readership.

Since 2010 the magazine has been edited by Shogakukan's Post Seven editorial bureau (ポスト・セブン編集局), which also runs the news website News Post Seven.

As of September 2026 the publisher's media guide states that Shūkan Post's printing-certified circulation stands at 241,625 copies.

== Controversies ==
In September 2019 the magazine's issue with a special titled "Korean People We Don't Need" (韓国なんて要らない) drew criticism; writers called it discriminatory and inciting hatred, and Shogakukan published an editorial apology on the magazine's website, stating the special "lacked consideration."

Courts have on occasion found Shūkan Post articles defamatory. In 2012 the Tokyo District Court ruled against Shogakukan and ordered compensation over an article about boxer Kōki Kameda; in 2021 the Kyoto District Court found that claims in a Shūkan Post article about a former yakuza member were not established as fact and ruled against Shogakukan.

In March 2026 Shūkan Bunshun reported that a Shūkan Post editorial staffer had, in 2018, sought sexual favors from an employee of a business contact while exploiting the trading relationship. Shogakukan responded with a statement confirming the 2018 misconduct led to a criminal complaint (later dropped), a prior internal action in 2020, and the employee's departure after further misconduct emerged in 2025, and it announced the matter would be reported to a third-party committee.
