= Tom Hurd (civil servant) =

British civil servant

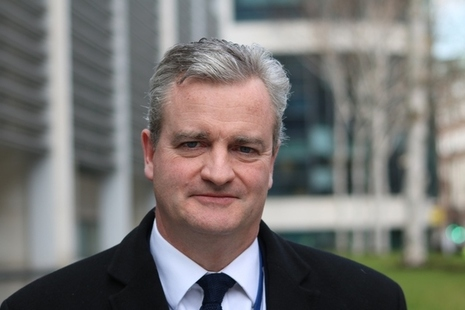
Tom Hurd

Thomas Hurd, CB, known as Tom Hurd, is the former head of the 'Joint Biosecurity Centre' announced by UK Prime Minister Boris Johnson in May 2020.

He held the position from May 2020 to June 2020, when he was replaced by Dr Clare Gardiner. Hurd was formerly the director general of the British Government's Office for Security and Counter-Terrorism.

== Life ==
Hurd is the son of Douglas Hurd. He was educated at Eton College and Oxford University with Boris Johnson.
