= Asumiko Nakamura =

Japanese manga artist

Asumiko Nakamura 中村 明日美子
- Born: January 5 Kanagawa, Japan
- Areas: Manga artist, illustrator
- Notable works: Classmates, Utsubora

Asumiko Nakamura (中村 明日美子, Nakamura Asumiko) is a Japanese manga artist and illustrator, born in Kanagawa Prefecture on January 5, 1979. She debuted in 2000 in the magazine Monthly Manga F, later known as Manga Erotics F. She is best known for her Boys' Love manga series Dōkyūsei (ja:同級生, Classmates) which started serialization in 2006. The manga was made into an animated movie in 2016 that made 200 million JPY at the box office. It was also adapted into English and released to Blu-ray. The Boys' Love manga Double Mints (2009) was made into a live action film in 2017. The mystery manga Utsubora - A Story of a Novelist (2010) was translated and published into English by Vertical and made into a Japanese tv drama in 2022. Other major works include Kimiyōbi: Tetsudō Shōjo Manga 2, Kaori no Keishō, Ano hi, seifuku de, which have charted on Oricon's best-selling manga in 2015.

== Works ==
=== Series ===
- Chicken Club (鶏肉倶楽部), 2002
- Koperunikusu no Kokyū (コペルニクスの呼吸), 2002
- All About J (Jの総て), 2004–2006
- Classmates, published as:
  - Dou Kyu Sei, 2006–2007
  - Sotsu Gyo Sei – Winter, 2008
  - Sotsu Gyo Sei – Spring, 2009
  - Sora to Hara, 2009–2011
  - O.B., 2012–2013
  - Blanc (ブラン), 2018–2020
  - Home, 2020–2022
  - Sajou Rihito no Chichi to Sono Buka, 2022–present
- Barairo no hoho no koro When I was Thirteen (ばら色の頬のころWhen I was Thirteen), 2007
- Nokemono to Hanayome (with Kunihiko Ikuhara), published as:
  - Nokemono to Hanayome, 2007–2017
  - Nokemono to Hanayome+, 2018–2020
- Katakoi no Nikki Shōjo (片恋の日記少女), 2008
- 2-Shūkan no abanchūru (2週間のアバンチュール), 2008
- Magarikado no Bokura (曲がり角のボクら), 2009
- Anatanotamenara Dokomademo (あなたのためならどこまでも), 2010
  - Naraku Izuko Emaki - Anata no Tame Nara Doko Made mo - Heian-chou Special (奈落何処絵巻あなたのためならどこまでも平安調スペシャル限定版), 2013
- Yobidashi (呼出し一), 2010
- Utsubora: The Story of a Novelist, 2010–2012
- Double Mintz (ダブルミンツ), 2013
- Ohayō Rakuen-kun (Kari) (おはよう楽園くん（仮）), 2015
- Tetsudo-Syoujo-Manga (鉄道少女漫画) 2011–2015
- Sensei's "Otori-yose" (Sensei no otoriyose), 2014
- Kaori no Keishō (薫りの継承), 2015
- Ano Hi, Seifuku De (あの日、制服で), 2015
- Neo Kiseiju (ネオ寄生獣), 2016
- A White Rose in Bloom (メジロバナの咲く, Mejirobana no Saku), 2017–present
- Tales of the Kingdom (王国物語, Oukoku Monogatari), 2017–2025

=== Anthologies ===
- Me ro neko neko manga ansorojī (めろねこ猫まんがアンソロジー), 2012
- Le Théâtre de A (Bの劇場LE THÉÂTRE DE A), 2012
- Le Théâtre de B (Bの劇場LE THÉÂTRE DE B), 2013
