= Jiro Matsumoto =

Japanese manga artist (born 1970)

- Born: August 20, 1970 (age 55); Nerima, Tokyo
- Occupation: Manga artist
- Website: matsumotojiro.web.fc2.com

Jiro Matsumoto (Japanese: 松本次郎, Hepburn: Matsumoto Jiro) is a Japanese manga artist most known for his work on Freesia. Much of his manga is explicit in nature, frequently containing copious amounts of sex and violence.

Matsumoto's work Becchin & Mandara was released in English August 2011 as Velveteen & Mandala by North American publisher Vertical Inc. Other works by Matsumoto include Uncivilized Planet, Keep on Vibrating, Wendy, Avant-Pop Mars, Little Feet, A Revolutionist in the Afternoon and Tropical Citron
