= Naoki Yamamoto (manga artist) =

Japanese manga artist

Naoki Yamamoto (山本 直樹, Yamamoto Naoki) is a Japanese manga artist. In his early years, he also used pen names Tō Moriyama (森山 塔, Moriyama Tō) and Mori Tōyama (塔山 森, Tōyama Mori) for his earlier adult-oriented works. He was born in Matsumae District, Fukushima, Hokkaido and graduated from Waseda University's Department of Literature.

== Bibliography ==
(Manga works as Tou Moriyama not listed)

- (1984) Hora Konna ni Akaku Natteru
- (1986) Makasensasei!
- (1986) Happa 64 (はっぱ64)
- (1987) Kiwamete Kamoshida
- (1988) Gomen ne B-Boy
- (1989) Asatte Dance (あさってDance); English translation: Dance till Tomorrow (1999)
- (1990) Blue
- (1992) Bokura wa minna ikite iru
- (1992) Young & Fine
- (1992) Flakes (フレイクス)
- (1993) Yume de aimashou
- (1993) Kamoshida-kun Fight!
- (1994) Kimi to itsu made mo
- (1994) Koke Dish
- (1994) Summer Memories

Cover of Arigatō, vol. 1

- (1994) Arigatō (ありがとう; lit. 'Thank You') is a four volume manga by Yamamoto appearing in Weekly Big Comic Spirits and published by Shogakukan. It was adapted into a live-action film directed by Masaaki Odagiri in 1996. Arigatō is a story about how a Japanese family's life goes wrong.
- (1997) Fragments
- (1999) Believers (ビリーバーズ)
- (2000) Terebi Bakari Miteruto Baka ni Naru (テレビばかり見てると馬鹿になる, Watching Fuckin' TV All Time Makes a Fool)
- (2002) Anju no Chi
- (2005) Aozora
- (2007) Red; won the Japanese government's Japan Media Arts Festival manga award for 2010

== Contributed works ==
- Angelium (OVA): Color Checking
- Dark (OVA): Finishing Supervision
- Hooligan (OVA): Finishing
- Sousei no Aquarion (TV): Digital Paint (ep 6)

== Under the name Tō Moriyama ==
- Cream Lemon (くりいむレモン) (OVA)
  - "Tō Moriyama Special I: Five Hour Venus"
  - "Tō Moriyama Special II: Afterschool XXX"
  - "Tō Moriyama Best Hit: It May Be So"
- Body Jack Tanoshii Yūtai Ridatsu (ボディジャック 楽しい幽体離脱) (OVA)
