= Joint Biosecurity Centre =

UK government scientific body

The Joint Biosecurity Centre (JBC) is a scientific body which seeks to advise United Kingdom government policy as part of the response to outbreaks of COVID-19, such as on testing deployment, international travel, and the UK 'COVID-19 alert level'. Its existence was announced by Prime Minister Boris Johnson in May 2020. The body has been part of the UK Health Security Agency since the establishment of that agency on 1 April 2021.

== Accountability and personnel ==
The Minister of State for Social Care at the Department of Health and Social Care, Helen Whately, has oversight of the JBC.

Tom Hurd, a civil servant, held the chief position at the JBC from May 2020 to June 2020, when he was replaced by Clare Gardiner, on secondment from her role as a director at the National Cyber Security Centre. However, the post is believed to have been vacant since June 2021.

The epidemiologist Thomas Waite, formerly a senior leader at Public Health England, took part in the creation of the JBC. In October 2020 he was described as its director of health protection, and was its director of health analysis until he took up a Deputy Chief Medical Officer post in July 2021.

As of July 2021, Johanna Hutchinson is the head of data and data science.

== History ==
In June 2020, the body was said to be part of the NHS Test and Trace service, and it was reported that a small number of staff from GCHQ had been seconded to help the centre develop its data analytics capabilities.

In October 2020, it came to light that one of the responsibilities of the JBC was "the local lockdowns enforced on millions of people across the country". The JBC made the news in October 2020 when it was the subject of discussion over the secrecy to which it was entitled. Certain MPs and scientists then demanded that the minutes and the membership of the JBC be published.

In the same month, it came to light that the JBC was responsible for decisions to impose movement restrictions in London, York and other areas. Certain MPs were upset that the JBC failed to publish either its analysis or its argument(s). Even its premises were shielded from view by its Health Protection bureau chief.

In July 2021, the JBC was rebuked by the Office for Statistics Regulation over lack of transparency regarding data to support a 16 July decision by the government to strengthen quarantine requirements for travellers arriving in England from France.
