= Ohta Publishing =

Japanese publishing company

- Type: Kabushiki-gaisha
- Industry: Publishing
- Founded: November 25, 1985; 40 years ago
- Headquarters: Tokyo, Japan
- Key people: Satoshi Oka (CEO)
- Products: Books, magazines
- Owner: Ohta Production
- Number of employees: 19 (2020)
- Website: https://www.ohtabooks.com/

Ohta Publishing Company (太田出版, Ōta Shuppan) is a Japanese publishing company. With a number of controversial books that disturbed the Japanese society and its erotic manga comics, the company has established itself like a source of provocative "subculture" items.

== History ==
Ohta Publishing was created in 1985, when it separated from the publishing department of Ohta Production, a talent agency specializing in stand-up comedians. (Founded as a yūgen-gaisha, it has, as of 2013, been converted to a kabushiki gaisha.)

Initially, from an outside perspective, Ohta Publishing did not seem like a serious company but rather a sort of toy company of Takeshi Kitano (who was an Ohta Production artist back then). It released books that were of interest to Kitano himself.

In 1989, Ohta published the famous book The Age of M about serial child murderer Tsutomu Miyazaki and started establishing itself like a source of provocative "subculture" items. Around the same time, the bi-monthly magazine QuickJapan was founded. In 1993 Ohta released the book The Complete Manual of Suicide and in 1999 Battle Royale, which shook Japanese society.

At the end of the 1990s, the company also started working with manga artist Naoki Yamamoto, dubbed the master of erotics, and founded the manga magazine Manga Erotics. Its successor Manga Erotics F now accounts for a large percentage of all company's manga sales.

== Prominent titles ==
The company is best known for having published books like The Age of M (1989), The Complete Manual of Suicide (1993) and Battle Royale (1999), other books including The Tatami Galaxy and Eien no Zero, and numerous manga comics. It also publishes the manga magazine Manga Erotics F and the magazine QuickJapan. Some other recent manga titles include Miyamoto kara Kimi e and Kami no Kodomo.

== List of periodic and serial publications ==
=== Print magazines ===
- QuickJapan^{(ja)}
- Manga Erotics F
- Kettle^{(ja)}
- At Plus (atプラス)
- D/sign (d/sign)
- CONTINUE
  - GIRLS CONTINUE

=== Web magazines ===
- Poko Poko^{(ja)} (ぽこぽこ)

=== Manga ===
- Astro Kyūdan
- Bradherley no Basha
- La Croisade des Innocents
- The Devil is So Cute
- Don't Disturb Me and Him, Please
- Don't Say Anymore, Darling
- Drops
- Gente - Ristorante no Hitobito
- A Girl on the Shore
- Hallucination from the Womb
- Keep on Vibrating
- Kokumin Quiz
- Lychee Light Club
- Mariko Parade
- Mikai no Hoshi
- Nijigahara Holograph
- Not Love But Delicious Foods Make Me So Happy!
- Palepoli
- Pico-Pico Boy
- Pico-Pico Boy Turbo
- Punctures
- Ristorante Paradiso
- Romance of an Ancient Dreaming City
- Scenes from Awajima
- Sennen Gahō
- Since I Could Die Tomorrow
- Sweet Blue Flowers
- The Tales of the Town Uroshima
- Tora & Ken's Happy Lovely Life!
- Tropical Citron - Psychedelic Witch Story
- Utsubora - A Story of a Novelist
- Velveteen & Mandala
- Watching Fuckin' TV All Time Makes a Fool
- Yukiko's Spinach
