= List of The Kindaichi Case Files chapters =

The cover of The Kindaichi Case Files volume 1 as released by Kodansha in February, 1993 in Japan.

The Kindaichi Case Files is a Japanese mystery manga authored by Yōzaburō Kanari (earlier series) and Seimaru Amagi (later series) and illustrated by Fumiya Satō. The first two series (File and Case series) were serialized in Kodansha's Weekly Shōnen Magazine from 1992 to 2000. The New series, which was serialized in Weekly Shōnen Magazine between 2004 and 2011, was published at irregular intervals. The regular serialization resumed in 2012 to celebrate the 20th anniversary. In 2013 the series title changed to The Kindaichi Case Files R (Returns) (金田一少年の事件簿R, Kindaichi Shōnen no Jikenbo Ritānzu) and the regular weekly serialization continues as before. A spin-off manga titled Takato Case Files (高遠少年の事件簿, Takatō Shōnen no Jikenbo), which centred on the primary antagonist Yoichi Takato, was serialized in the webcomic mobile app Manga Box between December 4, 2013, and March 26, 2014. One tankōbon volume of Takato Case Files was released in Japan on May 9, 2014. Another spin-off manga titled The Akechi Files (明智警部の事件簿, Akechi Keibu no Jikenbo) started serialization in the June 2014 issue of Magazine Special and it is illustrated by Yūki Satō.

The entire series is divided into File series (FILEシリーズ, Fairu Shirīzu) (27 volumes), Case series (Caseシリーズ, Kēsu Shirīzu) (10 volumes), Short File series (Short Fileシリーズ, Shōto Fairu Shirīzu) (6 volumes), Akechi File series (Akechi Fileシリーズ, Akechi Fairu Shirīzu) (2 volumes), New series (新シリーズ, Shinshirīzu) (14 volumes), 20th Anniversary series (20周年記念シリーズ, Nijū Shūnenkinen Shirīzu) (5 volumes), The Kindaichi Case Files R (Returns) (8 volumes) and spin-off series (1 volume). As of January 15, 2016, 73 volumes in total have been released in Japan.

A manga omake titled Unusual Case Files of Young Kindaichi: Kaijingyō Legend Murder Case (金田一少年の怪奇事件簿 海人漁伝説殺人事件, Kindaichi Shōnen no Kaiki Jikenbo Kaijingyō Densetsu Satsujin Jiken) is only included as a bonus feature in The Kindaichi Case Files DVD Collectors Box which was released in Japan in 2007.

In 1995, the manga received the 19th Kodansha Manga Award (shōnen section). The series is licensed for an English language release in North America by Tokyopop. The English volumes are published under separate titles which are different from the original Japanese titles. The chapters contained in the English volumes are also different from the Japanese counterparts. While many of the original Japanese volumes contain two mysteries in one book, the chapters in each English volume form a single mystery story and different mysteries are published in separate volumes. Various bilingual (Japanese-English) volumes have been released.

== Volumes ==
=== File series ===
No.	Title	Original release date	English release date
1	Kindaichi Case Files 1 Kindaichi Shōnen no Jikenbo Ichi (金田一少年の事件簿①)	February 17, 1993; 978-4-0631-1874-2	June 10, 2003; 978-1-5918-2354-4
File 1: 1. "Opera House Murder Case 1" (オペラ座館殺人事件①, "Operazakan Satsujin Jiken Ichi"); 2. "Opera House Murder Case 2" (オペラ座館殺人事件②, "Operazakan Satsujin Jiken Ni"); 3. "Opera House Murder Case 3" (オペラ座館殺人事件③, "Operazakan Satsujin Jiken San"); 4. "Opera House Murder Case 4" (オペラ座館殺人事件④, "Operazakan Satsujin Jiken Yon")
2	Kindaichi Case Files 2 Kindaichi Shōnen no Jikenbo Ni (金田一少年の事件簿②)	April 17, 1993; 978-4-0631-1895-7	August 12, 2003; 978-1-5918-2355-1
File 1: 5. "Opera House Murder Case 5" (オペラ座館殺人事件⑤, "Operazakan Satsujin Jiken Go"); 6. "Opera House Murder Case Final" (オペラ座館殺人事件終, "Operazakan Satsujin Jiken Saishū"); File 2: 1. "Western-style Village Murder Case 1" (異人館村殺人事件①, "Ijinkanmura Satsujin Jiken Ichi"); 2. "Western-style Village Murder Case 2" (異人館村殺人事件②, "Ijinkanmura Satsujin Jiken Ni"); 3. "Western-style Village Murder Case 3" (異人館村殺人事件③, "Ijinkanmura Satsujin Jiken San"); 4. "Western-style Village Murder Case 4" (異人館村殺人事件④, "Ijinkanmura Satsujin Jiken Yon"); 5. "Western-style Village Murder Case 5" (異人館村殺人事件⑤, "Ijinkanmura Satsujin Jiken Go"); 6. "Western-style Village Murder Case 6" (異人館村殺人事件⑥, "Ijinkanmura Satsujin Jiken Roku")
3	Kindaichi Case Files 3 Kindaichi Shōnen no Jikenbo San (金田一少年の事件簿③)	June 17, 1993; 978-4-0631-1914-5	October 7, 2003; 978-1-5918-2356-8
File 2: 7. "Western-style Village Murder Case 7" (異人館村殺人事件⑦, "Ijinkanmura Satsujin Jiken Nana"); 8. "Western-style Village Murder Case 8" (異人館村殺人事件⑧, "Ijinkanmura Satsujin Jiken Hachi"); 9. "Western-style Village Murder Case 9" (異人館村殺人事件⑨, "Ijinkanmura Satsujin Jiken Kyū"); 10. "Western-style Village Murder Case 10" (異人館村殺人事件⑩, "Ijinkanmura Satsujin Jiken Jū"); 11. "Western-style Village Murder Case Final" (異人館村殺人事件終, "Ijinkanmura Satsujin Jiken Saishū"); File 3: 1. "Snow Yaksha Legend Murder Case 1" (雪夜叉伝説殺人事件①, "Yukiyasha Densetsu Satsujin Jiken Ichi"); 2. "Snow Yaksha Legend Murder Case 2" (雪夜叉伝説殺人事件②, "Yukiyasha Densetsu Satsujin Jiken Ni"); 3. "Snow Yaksha Legend Murder Case 3" (雪夜叉伝説殺人事件③, "Yukiyasha Densetsu Satsujin Jiken San"); 4. "Snow Yaksha Legend Murder Case 4" (雪夜叉伝説殺人事件④, "Yukiyasha Densetsu Satsujin Jiken Yon")
4	Kindaichi Case Files 4 Kindaichi Shōnen no Jikenbo Yon (金田一少年の事件簿④)	September 17, 1993; 978-4-0631-1941-1	December 9, 2003; 978-1-5918-2357-5
File 3: 5. "Snow Yaksha Legend Murder Case 5" (雪夜叉伝説殺人事件⑤, "Yukiyasha Densetsu Satsujin Jiken Go"); 6. "Snow Yaksha Legend Murder Case 6" (雪夜叉伝説殺人事件⑥, "Yukiyasha Densetsu Satsujin Jiken Roku"); 7. "Snow Yaksha Legend Murder Case 7" (雪夜叉伝説殺人事件⑦, "Yukiyasha Densetsu Satsujin Jiken Nana"); 8. "Snow Yaksha Legend Murder Case 8" (雪夜叉伝説殺人事件⑧, "Yukiyasha Densetsu Satsujin Jiken Hachi"); 9. "Snow Yaksha Legend Murder Case 9" (雪夜叉伝説殺人事件⑨, "Yukiyasha Densetsu Satsujin Jiken Kyū"); 10. "Snow Yaksha Legend Murder Case Final" (雪夜叉伝説殺人事件終, "Yukiyasha Densetsu Satsujin Jiken Saishū"); File 4: 1. "School's Seven Mysteries Murder Case 1" (学園七不思議殺人事件①, "Gakuen Nanafushigi Satsujin Jiken Ichi"); 2. "School's Seven Mysteries Murder Case 2" (学園七不思議殺人事件②, "Gakuen Nanafushigi Satsujin Jiken Ni"); 3. "School's Seven Mysteries Murder Case 3" (学園七不思議殺人事件③, "Gakuen Nanafushigi Satsujin Jiken San")
5	Kindaichi Case Files 5 Kindaichi Shōnen no Jikenbo Go (金田一少年の事件簿⑤)	November 17, 1993; 978-4-0631-1960-2	February 10, 2004; 978-1-5918-2359-9
File 4: 4. "School's Seven Mysteries Murder Case 4" (学園七不思議殺人事件④, "Gakuen Nanafushigi Satsujin Jiken Yon"); 5. "School's Seven Mysteries Murder Case 5" (学園七不思議殺人事件⑤, "Gakuen Nanafushigi Satsujin Jiken Go"); 6. "School's Seven Mysteries Murder Case 6" (学園七不思議殺人事件⑥, "Gakuen Nanafushigi Satsujin Jiken Roku"); 7. "School's Seven Mysteries Murder Case 7" (学園七不思議殺人事件⑦, "Gakuen Nanafushigi Satsujin Jiken Nana"); 8. "School's Seven Mysteries Murder Case 8" (学園七不思議殺人事件⑧, "Gakuen Nanafushigi Satsujin Jiken Hachi"); 9. "School's Seven Mysteries Murder Case 9" (学園七不思議殺人事件⑨, "Gakuen Nanafushigi Satsujin Jiken Kyū"); 10. "School's Seven Mysteries Murder Case Final" (学園七不思議殺人事件終, "Gakuen Nanafushigi Satsujin Jiken Saishū"); File 5: 1. "Treasure Island Murder Case 1" (秘宝島殺人事件①, "Hihōtō Satsujin Jiken Ichi"); 2. "Treasure Island Murder Case 2" (秘宝島殺人事件②, "Hihōtō Satsujin Jiken Ni")
6	Kindaichi Case Files 6 Kindaichi Shōnen no Jikenbo Roku (金田一少年の事件簿⑥)	February 17, 1994; 978-4-0631-1990-9	April 6, 2004; 978-1-5918-2360-5
File 5: 3. "Treasure Island Murder Case 3" (秘宝島殺人事件③, "Hihōtō Satsujin Jiken San"); 4. "Treasure Island Murder Case 4" (秘宝島殺人事件④, "Hihōtō Satsujin Jiken Yon"); 5. "Treasure Island Murder Case 5" (秘宝島殺人事件⑤, "Hihōtō Satsujin Jiken Go"); 6. "Treasure Island Murder Case 6" (秘宝島殺人事件⑥, "Hihōtō Satsujin Jiken Roku"); 7. "Treasure Island Murder Case 7" (秘宝島殺人事件⑦, "Hihōtō Satsujin Jiken Nana"); 8. "Treasure Island Murder Case 8" (秘宝島殺人事件⑧, "Hihōtō Satsujin Jiken Hachi"); 9. "Treasure Island Murder Case 9" (秘宝島殺人事件⑨, "Hihōtō Satsujin Jiken Kyū"); 10. "Treasure Island Murder Case Final" (秘宝島殺人事件終, "Hihōtō Satsujin Jiken Saishū"); File 6: 1. "Broken Heart Lake Legend Murder Case 1" (悲恋湖伝説殺人事件①, "Hirenko Densetsu Satsujin Jiken Ichi")
7	Kindaichi Case Files 7 Kindaichi Shōnen no Jikenbo Nana (金田一少年の事件簿⑦)	April 16, 1994; 978-4-0631-2009-7	June 1, 2004; 978-1-5918-2478-7
File 6: 2. "Broken Heart Lake Legend Murder Case 2" (悲恋湖伝説殺人事件②, "Hirenko Densetsu Satsujin Jiken Ni"); 3. "Broken Heart Lake Legend Murder Case 3" (悲恋湖伝説殺人事件③, "Hirenko Densetsu Satsujin Jiken San"); 4. "Broken Heart Lake Legend Murder Case 4" (悲恋湖伝説殺人事件④, "Hirenko Densetsu Satsujin Jiken Yon"); 5. "Broken Heart Lake Legend Murder Case 5" (悲恋湖伝説殺人事件⑤, "Hirenko Densetsu Satsujin Jiken Go"); 6. "Broken Heart Lake Legend Murder Case 6" (悲恋湖伝説殺人事件⑥, "Hirenko Densetsu Satsujin Jiken Roku"); 7. "Broken Heart Lake Legend Murder Case 7" (悲恋湖伝説殺人事件⑦, "Hirenko Densetsu Satsujin Jiken Nana"); 8. "Broken Heart Lake Legend Murder Case 8" (悲恋湖伝説殺人事件⑧, "Hirenko Densetsu Satsujin Jiken Hachi"); 9. "Broken Heart Lake Legend Murder Case 9" (悲恋湖伝説殺人事件⑨, "Hirenko Densetsu Satsujin Jiken Kyū"); 10. "Broken Heart Lake Legend Murder Case Final" (悲恋湖伝説殺人事件終, "Hirenko Densetsu Satsujin Jiken Saishū")
8	Kindaichi Case Files 8 Kindaichi Shōnen no Jikenbo Hachi (金田一少年の事件簿⑧)	July 15, 1994; 978-4-0631-2036-3	August 3, 2004; 978-1-5918-2479-4
File 7: 1. "Western-style Hotel Murder Case 1" (異人館ホテル殺人事件①, "Ijinkan Hoteru Satsujin Jiken Ichi"); 2. "Western-style Hotel Murder Case 2" (異人館ホテル殺人事件②, "Ijinkan Hoteru Satsujin Jiken Ni"); 3. "Western-style Hotel Murder Case 3" (異人館ホテル殺人事件③, "Ijinkan Hoteru Satsujin Jiken San"); 4. "Western-style Hotel Murder Case 4" (異人館ホテル殺人事件④, "Ijinkan Hoteru Satsujin Jiken Yon"); 5. "Western-style Hotel Murder Case 5" (異人館ホテル殺人事件⑤, "Ijinkan Hoteru Satsujin Jiken Go"); 6. "Western-style Hotel Murder Case 6" (異人館ホテル殺人事件⑥, "Ijinkan Hoteru Satsujin Jiken Roku"); 7. "Western-style Hotel Murder Case 7" (異人館ホテル殺人事件⑦, "Ijinkan Hoteru Satsujin Jiken Nana"); 8. "Western-style Hotel Murder Case 8" (異人館ホテル殺人事件⑧, "Ijinkan Hoteru Satsujin Jiken Hachi")
9	Kindaichi Case Files 9 Kindaichi Shōnen no Jikenbo Kyū (金田一少年の事件簿⑨)	September 16, 1994; 978-4-0631-2052-3	October 5, 2004; 978-1-5918-2480-0
File 7: 9. "Western-style Hotel Murder Case 9" (異人館ホテル殺人事件⑨, "Ijinkan Hoteru Satsujin Jiken Kyū"); 10. "Western-style Hotel Murder Case 10" (異人館ホテル殺人事件⑩, "Ijinkan Hoteru Satsujin Jiken Jū"); 11. "Western-style Hotel Murder Case 11" (異人館ホテル殺人事件⑪, "Ijinkan Hoteru Satsujin Jiken Jūichi"); 12. "Western-style Hotel Murder Case Final" (異人館ホテル殺人事件終, "Ijinkan Hoteru Satsujin Jiken Saishū"); File 8: 1. "Head Hanging School Murder Case 1" (首吊り学園殺人事件①, "Kubitsuri Gakuen Satsujin Jiken Ichi"); 2. "Head Hanging School Murder Case 2" (首吊り学園殺人事件②, "Kubitsuri Gakuen Satsujin Jiken Ni"); 3. "Head Hanging School Murder Case 3" (首吊り学園殺人事件③, "Kubitsuri Gakuen Satsujin Jiken San"); 4. "Head Hanging School Murder Case 4" (首吊り学園殺人事件④, "Kubitsuri Gakuen Satsujin Jiken Yon")
10	Kindaichi Case Files 10; Kindaichi Shōnen no Jikenbo Jū (金田一少年の事件簿⑩)	December 14, 1994; 978-4-0631-2083-7	December 7, 2004; 978-1-5918-2481-7
File 8: 5. "Head Hanging School Murder Case 5" (首吊り学園殺人事件⑤, "Kubitsuri Gakuen Satsujin Jiken Go"); 6. "Head Hanging School Murder Case 6" (首吊り学園殺人事件⑥, "Kubitsuri Gakuen Satsujin Jiken Roku"); 7. "Head Hanging School Murder Case 7" (首吊り学園殺人事件⑦, "Kubitsuri Gakuen Satsujin Jiken Nana"); 8. "Head Hanging School Murder Case 8" (首吊り学園殺人事件⑧, "Kubitsuri Gakuen Satsujin Jiken Hachi"); 9. "Head Hanging School Murder Case 9" (首吊り学園殺人事件⑨, "Kubitsuri Gakuen Satsujin Jiken Kyū"); 10. "Head Hanging School Murder Case 10" (首吊り学園殺人事件⑩, "Kubitsuri Gakuen Satsujin Jiken Jū"); 11. "Head Hanging School Murder Case 11" (首吊り学園殺人事件⑪, "Kubitsuri Gakuen Satsujin Jiken Jūichi"); 12. "Head Hanging School Murder Case Final" (首吊り学園殺人事件終, "Kubitsuri Gakuen Satsujin Jiken Saishū")
11	Kindaichi Case Files 11; Kindaichi Shōnen no Jikenbo Jūichi (金田一少年の事件簿⑪)	February 16, 1995; 978-4-0631-2106-3	April 12, 2005; 978-1-5953-2695-9
File 9: 1. "Hida's Trick of House Murder Case 1" (飛騨からくり屋敷殺人事件①, "Hida Karakuri Yashiki Satsujin Jiken Ichi"); 2. "Hida's Trick of House Murder Case 2" (飛騨からくり屋敷殺人事件②, "Hida Karakuri Yashiki Satsujin Jiken Ni"); 3. "Hida's Trick of House Murder Case 3" (飛騨からくり屋敷殺人事件③, "Hida Karakuri Yashiki Satsujin Jiken San"); 4. "Hida's Trick of House Murder Case 4" (飛騨からくり屋敷殺人事件④, "Hida Karakuri Yashiki Satsujin Jiken Yon"); 5. "Hida's Trick of House Murder Case 5" (飛騨からくり屋敷殺人事件⑤, "Hida Karakuri Yashiki Satsujin Jiken Go"); 6. "Hida's Trick of House Murder Case 6" (飛騨からくり屋敷殺人事件⑥, "Hida Karakuri Yashiki Satsujin Jiken Roku"); 7. "Hida's Trick of House Murder Case 7" (飛騨からくり屋敷殺人事件⑦, "Hida Karakuri Yashiki Satsujin Jiken Nana"); 8. "Hida's Trick of House Murder Case 8" (飛騨からくり屋敷殺人事件⑧, "Hida Karakuri Yashiki Satsujin Jiken Hachi")
12	Kindaichi Case Files 12; Kindaichi Shōnen no Jikenbo Jūni (金田一少年の事件簿⑫)	April 17, 1995; 978-4-0631-2125-4	November 8, 2005; 978-1-5953-2696-6
File 9: 9. "Hida's Trick of House Murder Case 9" (飛騨からくり屋敷殺人事件⑨, "Hida Karakuri Yashiki Satsujin Jiken Kyū"); 10. "Hida's Trick of House Murder Case 10" (飛騨からくり屋敷殺人事件⑩, "Hida Karakuri Yashiki Satsujin Jiken Jū"); 11. "Hida's Trick of House Murder Case 11" (飛騨からくり屋敷殺人事件⑪, "Hida Karakuri Yashiki Satsujin Jiken Jūchi"); 12. "Hida's Trick of House Murder Case Final" (飛騨からくり屋敷殺人事件終, "Hida Karakuri Yashiki Satsujin Jiken Saishū"); File 10: 1. "Murder Committed by Young Kindaichi 1" (金田一少年の殺人①, "Kindaichi Shōnen no Satsujin Ichi"); 2. "Murder Committed by Young Kindaichi 2" (金田一少年の殺人②, "Kindaichi Shōnen no Satsujin Ni"); 3. "Murder Committed by Young Kindaichi 3" (金田一少年の殺人③, "Kindaichi Shōnen no Satsujin San"); 4. "Murder Committed by Young Kindaichi 4" (金田一少年の殺人④, "Kindaichi Shōnen no Satsujin Yon")
13	Kindaichi Case Files 13; Kindaichi Shōnen no Jikenbo Jūsan (金田一少年の事件簿⑬)	July 17, 1995; 978-4-0631-2157-5	May 9, 2006; 978-1-5953-2697-3
File 10: 5. "Murder Committed by Young Kindaichi 5" (金田一少年の殺人⑤, "Kindaichi Shōnen no Satsujin Go"); 6. "Murder Committed by Young Kindaichi 6" (金田一少年の殺人⑥, "Kindaichi Shōnen no Satsujin Roku"); 7. "Murder Committed by Young Kindaichi 7" (金田一少年の殺人⑦, "Kindaichi Shōnen no Satsujin Nana"); 8. "Murder Committed by Young Kindaichi 8" (金田一少年の殺人⑧, "Kindaichi Shōnen no Satsujin Hachi"); 9. "Murder Committed by Young Kindaichi 9" (金田一少年の殺人⑨, "Kindaichi Shōnen no Satsujin Kyū"); 10. "Murder Committed by Young Kindaichi 10" (金田一少年の殺人⑩, "Kindaichi Shōnen no Satsujin Jū"); 11. "Murder Committed by Young Kindaichi 11" (金田一少年の殺人⑪, "Kindaichi Shōnen no Satsujin Jūchi"); 12. "Murder Committed by Young Kindaichi 12" (金田一少年の殺人⑫, "Kindaichi Shōnen no Satsujin Jūni")
14	Kindaichi Case Files 14; Kindaichi Shōnen no Jikenbo Jūyon (金田一少年の事件簿⑭)	September 16, 1995; 978-4-0631-2177-3	October 31, 2006; 978-1-5953-2698-0
File 10: 13. "Murder Committed by Young Kindaichi 13" (金田一少年の殺人⑬, "Kindaichi Shōnen no Satsujin Jūsan"); 14. "Murder Committed by Young Kindaichi Final" (金田一少年の殺人終, "Kindaichi Shōnen no Satsujin Saishū"); File 11: 1. "Tarot Mountain Hut Murder Case 1" (タロット山荘殺人事件①, "Tarotto Sansō Satsujin Jiken Ichi"); 2. "Tarot Mountain Hut Murder Case 2" (タロット山荘殺人事件②, "Tarotto Sansō Satsujin Jiken Ni"); 3. "Tarot Mountain Hut Murder Case 3" (タロット山荘殺人事件③, "Tarotto Sansō Satsujin Jiken San"); 4. "Tarot Mountain Hut Murder Case 4" (タロット山荘殺人事件④, "Tarotto Sansō Satsujin Jiken Yon"); 5. "Tarot Mountain Hut Murder Case 5" (タロット山荘殺人事件⑤, "Tarotto Sansō Satsujin Jiken Go"); 6. "Tarot Mountain Hut Murder Case 6" (タロット山荘殺人事件⑥, "Tarotto Sansō Satsujin Jiken Roku")
15	Kindaichi Case Files 15; Kindaichi Shōnen no Jikenbo Jūgo (金田一少年の事件簿⑮)	December 14, 1995; 978-4-0631-2211-4	May 1, 2007; 978-1-5953-2699-7
File 11: 7. "Tarot Mountain Hut Murder Case 7" (タロット山荘殺人事件⑦, "Tarotto Sansō Satsujin Jiken Nana"); 8. "Tarot Mountain Hut Murder Case 8" (タロット山荘殺人事件⑧, "Tarotto Sansō Satsujin Jiken Hachi"); 9. "Tarot Mountain Hut Murder Case 9" (タロット山荘殺人事件⑨, "Tarotto Sansō Satsujin Jiken Kyū"); 10. "Tarot Mountain Hut Murder Case 10" (タロット山荘殺人事件⑩, "Tarotto Sansō Satsujin Jiken Jū"); 11. "Tarot Mountain Hut Murder Case 11" (タロット山荘殺人事件⑪, "Tarotto Sansō Satsujin Jiken Jūichi"); 12. "Tarot Mountain Hut Murder Case 12" (タロット山荘殺人事件⑫, "Tarotto Sansō Satsujin Jiken Jūni"); 13. "Tarot Mountain Hut Murder Case 13" (タロット山荘殺人事件⑬, "Tarotto Sansō Satsujin Jiken Jūsan"); 14. "Tarot Mountain Hut Murder Case Final" (タロット山荘殺人事件終, "Tarotto Sansō Satsujin Jiken Saishū")
16	Kindaichi Case Files 16; Kindaichi Shōnen no Jikenbo Jūroku (金田一少年の事件簿⑯)	February 16, 1996; 978-4-0631-2233-6	November 6, 2007; 978-1-5953-2700-0
File 12: 1. "Wax Doll Castle Murder Case 1" (蝋人形城殺人事件①, "Rōningyō-jō Satsujin Jiken Ichi"); 2. "Wax Doll Castle Murder Case 2" (蝋人形城殺人事件②, "Rōningyō-jō Satsujin Jiken Ni"); 3. "Wax Doll Castle Murder Case 3" (蝋人形城殺人事件③, "Rōningyō-jō Satsujin Jiken San"); 4. "Wax Doll Castle Murder Case 4" (蝋人形城殺人事件④, "Rōningyō-jō Satsujin Jiken Yon"); 5. "Wax Doll Castle Murder Case 5" (蝋人形城殺人事件⑤, "Rōningyō-jō Satsujin Jiken Go"); 6. "Wax Doll Castle Murder Case 6" (蝋人形城殺人事件⑥, "Rōningyō-jō Satsujin Jiken Roku"); 7. "Wax Doll Castle Murder Case 7" (蝋人形城殺人事件⑦, "Rōningyō-jō Satsujin Jiken Nana"); 8. "Wax Doll Castle Murder Case 8" (蝋人形城殺人事件⑧, "Rōningyō-jō Satsujin Jiken Hachi"); 9. "Wax Doll Castle Murder Case 9" (蝋人形城殺人事件⑨, "Rōningyō-jō Satsujin Jiken Kyū")
17	Kindaichi Case Files 17; Kindaichi Shōnen no Jikenbo Jūnana (金田一少年の事件簿⑰)	April 17, 1996; 978-4-0631-2258-9	May 6, 2008; 978-1-5953-2701-7
File 12: 10. "Wax Doll Castle Murder Case 10" (蝋人形城殺人事件⑩, "Rōningyō-jō Satsujin Jiken Jū"); 11. "Wax Doll Castle Murder Case 11" (蝋人形城殺人事件⑪, "Rōningyō-jō Satsujin Jiken Jūichi"); 12. "Wax Doll Castle Murder Case 12" (蝋人形城殺人事件⑫, "Rōningyō-jō Satsujin Jiken Jūni"); 13. "Wax Doll Castle Murder Case Final" (蝋人形城殺人事件終, "Rōningyō-jō Satsujin Jiken Saishū"); File 13: 1. "Murder Committed by Gentleman Thief 1" (怪盗紳士の殺人①, "Kaitō Shinshi no Satsujin Ichi"); 2. "Murder Committed by Gentleman Thief 2" (怪盗紳士の殺人②, "Kaitō Shinshi no Satsujin Ni"); 3. "Murder Committed by Gentleman Thief 3" (怪盗紳士の殺人③, "Kaitō Shinshi no Satsujin San"); 4. "Murder Committed by Gentleman Thief 4" (怪盗紳士の殺人④, "Kaitō Shinshi no Satsujin Yon"); 5. "Murder Committed by Gentleman Thief 5" (怪盗紳士の殺人⑤, "Kaitō Shinshi no Satsujin Go")
18	Kindaichi Case Files 18; Kindaichi Shōnen no Jikenbo Jūhachi (金田一少年の事件簿⑱)	June 17, 1996; 978-4-0631-2281-7	—
File 13: 6. "Murder Committed by Gentleman Thief 6" (怪盗紳士の殺人⑥, "Kaitō Shinshi no Satsujin Roku"); 7. "Murder Committed by Gentleman Thief 7" (怪盗紳士の殺人⑦, "Kaitō Shinshi no Satsujin Nana"); 8. "Murder Committed by Gentleman Thief 8" (怪盗紳士の殺人⑧, "Kaitō Shinshi no Satsujin Hachi"); 9. "Murder Committed by Gentleman Thief 9" (怪盗紳士の殺人⑨, "Kaitō Shinshi no Satsujin Kyū"); 10. "Murder Committed by Gentleman Thief 10" (怪盗紳士の殺人⑩, "Kaitō Shinshi no Satsujin Jū"); 11. "Murder Committed by Gentleman Thief 11" (怪盗紳士の殺人⑪, "Kaitō Shinshi no Satsujin Jūichi"); 12. "Murder Committed by Gentleman Thief 12" (怪盗紳士の殺人⑫, "Kaitō Shinshi no Satsujin Jūni"); 13. "Murder Committed by Gentleman Thief Final" (怪盗紳士の殺人終, "Kaitō Shinshi no Satsujin Saishū")
19	Kindaichi Case Files 19; Kindaichi Shōnen no Jikenbo Jūkyū (金田一少年の事件簿⑲)	July 17, 1996; 978-4-0631-2291-6	—
File 14: 1. "Graveyard Island Murder Case 1" (墓場島殺人事件①, "Hakabajima Satsujin Jiken Ichi"); 2. "Graveyard Island Murder Case 2" (墓場島殺人事件②, "Hakabajima Satsujin Jiken Ni"); 3. "Graveyard Island Murder Case 3" (墓場島殺人事件③, "Hakabajima Satsujin Jiken San"); 4. "Graveyard Island Murder Case 4" (墓場島殺人事件④, "Hakabajima Satsujin Jiken Yon"); 5. "Graveyard Island Murder Case 5" (墓場島殺人事件⑤, "Hakabajima Satsujin Jiken Go"); 6. "Graveyard Island Murder Case 6" (墓場島殺人事件⑥, "Hakabajima Satsujin Jiken Roku"); 7. "Graveyard Island Murder Case 7" (墓場島殺人事件⑦, "Hakabajima Satsujin Jiken Nana"); 8. "Graveyard Island Murder Case 8" (墓場島殺人事件⑧, "Hakabajima Satsujin Jiken Hachi")
20	Kindaichi Case Files 20; Kindaichi Shōnen no Jikenbo Nijū (金田一少年の事件簿⑳)	August 12, 1996; 978-4-0631-2304-3	—
File 14: 9. "Graveyard Island Murder Case 9" (墓場島殺人事件⑨, "Hakabajima Satsujin Jiken Kyū"); 10. "Graveyard Island Murder Case 10" (墓場島殺人事件⑩, "Hakabajima Satsujin Jiken Jū"); 11. "Graveyard Island Murder Case Final" (墓場島殺人事件終, "Hakabajima Satsujin Jiken Saishū"); File 15: 1. "Magical Express Murder Case 1" (魔術列車殺人事件①, "Majutsu Ressha Satsujin Jiken Ichi"); 2. "Magical Express Murder Case 2" (魔術列車殺人事件②, "Majutsu Ressha Satsujin Jiken Ni"); 3. "Magical Express Murder Case 3" (魔術列車殺人事件③, "Majutsu Ressha Satsujin Jiken San"); 4. "Magical Express Murder Case 4" (魔術列車殺人事件④, "Majutsu Ressha Satsujin Jiken Yon"); 5. "Magical Express Murder Case 5" (魔術列車殺人事件⑤, "Majutsu Ressha Satsujin Jiken Go")
21	Kindaichi Case Files 21; Kindaichi Shōnen no Jikenbo Nijūichi (金田一少年の事件簿㉑)	November 15, 1996; 978-4-0631-2336-4	—
File 15: 6. "Magical Express Murder Case 6" (魔術列車殺人事件⑥, "Majutsu Ressha Satsujin Jiken Roku"); 7. "Magical Express Murder Case 7" (魔術列車殺人事件⑦, "Majutsu Ressha Satsujin Jiken Nana"); 8. "Magical Express Murder Case 8" (魔術列車殺人事件⑧, "Majutsu Ressha Satsujin Jiken Hachi"); 9. "Magical Express Murder Case 9" (魔術列車殺人事件⑨, "Majutsu Ressha Satsujin Jiken Kyū"); 10. "Magical Express Murder Case 10" (魔術列車殺人事件⑩, "Majutsu Ressha Satsujin Jiken Jū); 11. "Magical Express Murder Case 11" (魔術列車殺人事件⑪, "Majutsu Ressha Satsujin Jiken Jūichi"); 12. "Magical Express Murder Case 12" (魔術列車殺人事件⑫, "Majutsu Ressha Satsujin Jiken Jūni"); 13. "Magical Express Murder Case Final" (魔術列車殺人事件終, "Majutsu Ressha Satsujin Jiken Saishū")
22	Kindaichi Case Files 22; Kindaichi Shōnen no Jikenbo Nijūni (金田一少年の事件簿㉒)	January 17, 1997; 978-4-0631-2363-0	—
File 16: 1. "Black Butterfly of Death Murder Case 1" (黒死蝶殺人事件①, "Kokushichō Satsujin Jiken Ichi"); 2. "Black Butterfly of Death Murder Case 2" (黒死蝶殺人事件②, "Kokushichō Satsujin Jiken Ni"); 3. "Black Butterfly of Death Murder Case 3" (黒死蝶殺人事件③, "Kokushichō Satsujin Jiken San"); 4. "Black Butterfly of Death Murder Case 4" (黒死蝶殺人事件④, "Kokushichō Satsujin Jiken Yon"); 5. "Black Butterfly of Death Murder Case 5" (黒死蝶殺人事件⑤, "Kokushichō Satsujin Jiken Go"); 6. "Black Butterfly of Death Murder Case 6" (黒死蝶殺人事件⑥, "Kokushichō Satsujin Jiken Roku"); 7. "Black Butterfly of Death Murder Case 7" (黒死蝶殺人事件⑦, "Kokushichō Satsujin Jiken Nana"); 8. "Black Butterfly of Death Murder Case 8" (黒死蝶殺人事件⑧, "Kokushichō Satsujin Jiken Hachi"); 9. "Black Butterfly of Death Murder Case 9" (黒死蝶殺人事件⑨, "Kokushichō Satsujin Jiken Kyū")
23	Kindaichi Case Files 23; Kindaichi Shōnen no Jikenbo Nijūsan (金田一少年の事件簿㉓)	March 17, 1997; 978-4-0631-2383-8	—
File 16: 10. "Black Butterfly of Death Murder Case 10" (黒死蝶殺人事件⑩, "Kokushichō Satsujin Jiken Jū"); 11. "Black Butterfly of Death Murder Case 11" (黒死蝶殺人事件⑪, "Kokushichō Satsujin Jiken Jūichi"); 12. "Black Butterfly of Death Murder Case 12" (黒死蝶殺人事件⑫, "Kokushichō Satsujin Jiken Jūni"); 13. "Black Butterfly of Death Murder Case Final" (黒死蝶殺人事件終, "Kokushichō Satsujin Jiken Saishū"); File 17: 1. "French Silver Coin Murder Case 1" (仏蘭西銀貨殺人事件①, "Furansu Ginka Satsujin Jiken Ichi); 2. "French Silver Coin Murder Case 2" (仏蘭西銀貨殺人事件②, "Furansu Ginka Satsujin Jiken Ni"); 3. "French Silver Coin Murder Case 3" (仏蘭西銀貨殺人事件③, "Furansu Ginka Satsujin Jiken San"); 4. "French Silver Coin Murder Case 4" (仏蘭西銀貨殺人事件④, "Furansu Ginka Satsujin Jiken Yon")
24	Kindaichi Case Files 24; Kindaichi Shōnen no Jikenbo Nijūyon (金田一少年の事件簿㉔)	May 16, 1997; 978-4-0631-2406-4	—
File 17: 5. "French Silver Coin Murder Case 5" (仏蘭西銀貨殺人事件⑤, "Furansu Ginka Satsujin Jiken Go"); 6. "French Silver Coin Murder Case 6" (仏蘭西銀貨殺人事件⑥, "Furansu Ginka Satsujin Jiken Roku"); 7. "French Silver Coin Murder Case 7" (仏蘭西銀貨殺人事件⑦, "Furansu Ginka Satsujin Jiken Nana"); 8. "French Silver Coin Murder Case 8" (仏蘭西銀貨殺人事件⑧, "Furansu Ginka Satsujin Jiken Hachi"); 9. "French Silver Coin Murder Case 9" (仏蘭西銀貨殺人事件⑨, "Furansu Ginka Satsujin Jiken Kyū"); 10. "French Silver Coin Murder Case 10" (仏蘭西銀貨殺人事件⑩, "Furansu Ginka Satsujin Jiken Jū); 11. "French Silver Coin Murder Case 11" (仏蘭西銀貨殺人事件⑪, "Furansu Ginka Satsujin Jiken Jūichi"); 12. "French Silver Coin Murder Case 12" (仏蘭西銀貨殺人事件⑫, "Furansu Ginka Satsujin Jiken Jūni")
25	Kindaichi Case Files 25; Kindaichi Shōnen no Jikenbo Nijūgo (金田一少年の事件簿㉕)	July 17, 1997; 978-4-0631-2431-6	—
File 17: 13. "French Silver Coin Murder Case 13" (仏蘭西銀貨殺人事件⑬, "Furansu Ginka Satsujin Jiken Jūsan); 14. "French Silver Coin Murder Case Final" (仏蘭西銀貨殺人事件終, "Furansu Ginka Satsujin Jiken Saishū"); File 18: 1. "Demon God Site Murder Case 1" (魔神遺跡殺人事件①, "Majin Iseki Satsujin Jiken Ichi); 2. "Demon God Site Murder Case 2" (魔神遺跡殺人事件②, "Majin Iseki Satsujin Jiken Ni"); 3. "Demon God Site Murder Case 3" (魔神遺跡殺人事件③, "Majin Iseki Satsujin Jiken San"); 4. "Demon God Site Murder Case 4" (魔神遺跡殺人事件④, "Majin Iseki Satsujin Jiken Yon"); 5. "Demon God Site Murder Case 5" (魔神遺跡殺人事件⑤, "Majin Iseki Satsujin Jiken Go"); 6. "Demon God Site Murder Case 6" (魔神遺跡殺人事件⑥, "Majin Iseki Satsujin Jiken Roku")
26	Kindaichi Case Files 26; Kindaichi Shōnen no Jikenbo Nijūroku (金田一少年の事件簿㉖)	October 17, 1997; 978-4-0631-2462-0	—
File 18: 7. "Demon God Site Murder Case 7" (魔神遺跡殺人事件⑦, "Majin Iseki Satsujin Jiken Nana"); 8. "Demon God Site Murder Case 8" (魔神遺跡殺人事件⑧, "Majin Iseki Satsujin Jiken Hachi"); 9. "Demon God Site Murder Case 9" (魔神遺跡殺人事件⑨, "Majin Iseki Satsujin Jiken Kyū"); 10. "Demon God Site Murder Case 10" (魔神遺跡殺人事件⑩, "Majin Iseki Satsujin Jiken Jū); 11. "Demon God Site Murder Case 11" (魔神遺跡殺人事件⑪, "Majin Iseki Satsujin Jiken Jūichi"); 12. "Demon God Site Murder Case Final" (魔神遺跡殺人事件終, "Majin Iseki Satsujin Jiken Saishū"); File 19: 1. "Reika Hayami Kidnapping Murder Case 1" (速水玲香誘拐殺人事件①, "Hayami Reika Yūkai Satsujin Jiken Ichi); 2. "Reika Hayami Kidnapping Murder Case 2" (速水玲香誘拐殺人事件②, "Hayami Reika Yūkai Satsujin Jiken Ni")
27	Kindaichi Case Files 27; Kindaichi Shōnen no Jikenbo Nijūnana (金田一少年の事件簿㉗)	December 16, 1997; 978-4-0631-2488-0	—
File 19: 3. "Reika Hayami Kidnapping Murder Case 3" (速水玲香誘拐殺人事件③, "Hayami Reika Yūkai Satsujin Jiken San"); 4. "Reika Hayami Kidnapping Murder Case 4" (速水玲香誘拐殺人事件④, "Hayami Reika Yūkai Satsujin Jiken Yon"); 5. "Reika Hayami Kidnapping Murder Case 5" (速水玲香誘拐殺人事件⑤, "Hayami Reika Yūkai Satsujin Jiken Go"); 6. "Reika Hayami Kidnapping Murder Case 6" (速水玲香誘拐殺人事件⑥, "Hayami Reika Yūkai Satsujin Jiken Roku"); 7. "Reika Hayami Kidnapping Murder Case 7" (速水玲香誘拐殺人事件⑦, "Hayami Reika Yūkai Satsujin Jiken Nana"); 8. "Reika Hayami Kidnapping Murder Case 8" (速水玲香誘拐殺人事件⑧, "Hayami Reika Yūkai Satsujin Jiken Hachi"); 9. "Reika Hayami Kidnapping Murder Case Final" (速水玲香誘拐殺人事件終, "Hayami Reika Yūkai Satsujin Jiken Saishū")

=== Short File series ===
No.	Title	Japanese release date	Japanese ISBN
1	Young Kindaichi's Challenge; Kindaichi Shōnen no Chōsen (金田一少年の挑戦)	November 17, 1997	978-4-0631-9872-0
1. "Murderous Intention Under Freezing 15 Degrees Question Arc 1" (氷点下15度の殺意 問題編1, "Hyōtenka Jūgodo no Satsui Mondai-hen Ichi"); 2. "Murderous Intention Under Freezing 15 Degrees Question Arc 2" (氷点下15度の殺意 問題編2, "Hyōtenka Jūgodo no Satsui Mondai-hen Ni"); 3. "Murderous Intention Under Freezing 15 Degrees Answer Arc" (氷点下15度の殺意 解決編, "Hyōtenka Jūgodo no Satsui Kaiketsu-hen"); 4. "Who Killed the Goddess? Question Arc 1" (誰が女神を殺したか? 問題編1, "Dare ga Megami o Koroshita ka? Mondai-hen Ichi"); 5. "Who Killed the Goddess? Question Arc 2" (誰が女神を殺したか? 問題編2, "Dare ga Megami o Koroshita ka? Mondai-hen Ni"); 6. "Who Killed the Goddess? Answer Arc" (誰が女神を殺したか? 解決編, "Dare ga Megami o Koroshita ka? Kaiketsu-hen"); 7. "Supt.Akechi's Case Files Question Arc" (明智警視の事件簿 問題編, "Akechi Keishi no Jikenbo Mondai-hen"); 8. "Supt.Akechi's Case Files Answer Arc" (明智警視の事件簿 解決編, "Akechi Keishi no Jikenbo Kaiketsu-hen")
2	Young Kindaichi's Reasoning; Kindaichi Shōnen no Suiri (金田一少年の推理)	March 17, 1998	978-4-0631-9919-2
1. "1/2 Murderer Question Arc" (1/2の殺人者 問題編, "Nibun no Ichi no Satsujinsha Mondai-hen"); 2. "1/2 Murderer Answer Arc" (1/2の殺人者 解決編, " Nibun no Ichi no Satsujinsha Kaiketsu-hen"); 3. "Murder in Christmas Eve Question Arc 1" (聖なる夜の殺人 問題編1, "Seinaru Yoru no Satsujin Mondai-hen Ichi"); 4. "Murder in Christmas Eve Question Arc 2" (聖なる夜の殺人 問題編2, "Seinaru Yoru no Satsujin Mondai-hen Ni"); 5. "Murder in Christmas Eve Answer Arc 1" (聖なる夜の殺人 解決編1, "Seinaru Yoru no Satsujin Kaiketsu-hen Ichi"); 6. "Murder in Christmas Eve Answer Arc 2" (聖なる夜の殺人 解決編2, "Seinaru Yoru no Satsujin Kaiketsu-hen Ni"); 7. "Supt.Akechi's Case Files 2 Question Arc" (明智警視の事件簿2 問題編, "Akechi Keishi no Jikenbo Ni Mondai-hen"); 8. "Supt.Akechi's Case Files 2 Answer Arc" (明智警視の事件簿2 解決編, "Akechi Keishi no Jikenbo Ni Kaiketsu-hen")
3	Young Kindaichi's Adventure; Kindaichi Shōnen no Bōken (金田一少年の冒険)	August 17, 1998	978-4-0633-3966-6
1. "Murder in Mirror Labyrinth Question Arc" (鏡迷宮の殺人 問題編, "Mirā Rabirinsu no Satsujin Mondai-hen"); 2. "Murder in Mirror Labyrinth Answer Arc" (鏡迷宮の殺人 解決編, "Mirā Rabirinsu no Satsujin Kaiketsu-hen"); 3. "Fumi Kindaichi Kidnapping Case Question Arc" (金田一フミ誘拐事件 問題編, "Kindaichi Fumi Yūkai Jiken Mondai-hen"); 4. "Fumi Kindaichi Kidnapping Case Answer Arc" (金田一フミ誘拐事件 解決編, "Kindaichi Fumi Yūkai Jiken Kaiketsu-hen"); 5. "Young Akechi's Magnificent Case Files Question Arc 1" (明智少年の華麗なる事件簿 問題編1, "Akechi Shōnen no Karei Naru Jikenbo Mondai-hen Ichi"); 6. "Young Akechi's Magnificent Case Files Question Arc 2" (明智少年の華麗なる事件簿 問題編2, "Akechi Shōnen no Karei Naru Jikenbo Mondai-hen Ni"); 7. "Young Akechi's Magnificent Case Files Question Arc 3" (明智少年の華麗なる事件簿 問題編3, "Akechi Shōnen no Karei Naru Jikenbo Mondai-hen San"); 8. "Young Akechi's Magnificent Case Files Answer Arc" (明智少年の華麗なる事件簿 解決編, "Akechi Shōnen no Karei Naru Jikenbo Kaiketsu-hen")
4	Young Kindaichi's Dash; Kindaichi Shōnen no Shissō (金田一少年の疾走)	June 17, 1999	978-4-0633-4082-2
1. "Fumi Kindaichi's Adventure Question Arc" (金田一フミの冒険 問題編, "Kindaichi Fumi no Bōken Mondai-hen"); 2. "Fumi Kindaichi's Adventure Answer Arc" (金田一フミの冒険 解決編, " Kindaichi Fumi no Bōken Kaiketsu-hen"); 3. "Ransom Disappears in The Snows Question Arc" (白銀に消えた身代金 問題編, "Hakugin ni Kieta Minoshirokin Mondai-hen"); 4. "Ransom Disappears in The Snows Answer Arc" (白銀に消えた身代金 解決編, "Hakugin ni Kieta Minoshirokin Kaiketsu-hen"); 5. "Alibi in the Film Question Arc" (フィルムの中のアリバイ 問題編, "Firumu no Naka no Aribai Mondai-hen"); 6. "Alibi in the Film Answer Arc" (フィルムの中のアリバイ 解決編, "Firumu no Naka no Aribai Kaiketsu-hen"); 7. "Murder Restaurant Question Arc 1" (殺人レストラン 問題編1, "Satsujin Resutoran Mondai-hen Ichi"); 8. "Murder Restaurant Question Arc 2" (殺人レストラン 問題編2, "Satsujin Resutoran Mondai-hen Ni"); 9. "Murder Restaurant Answer Arc" (殺人レストラン 解決編, "Satsujin Resutoran Kaiketsu-hen")
5	Young Kindaichi's Duel; Kindaichi Shōnen no Taiketsu (金田一少年の対決)	November 17, 1999	978-4-0633-4252-9
1. "Murder in Bloody Pool Question Arc 1" (血染めプールの殺人 問題編1, "Buraddi Pūru no Satsujin Mondai-hen Ichi"); 2. "Murder in Bloody Pool Question Arc 2" (血染めプールの殺人 問題編2, "Buraddi Pūru no Satsujin Mondai-hen Ni"); 3. "Murder in Bloody Pool Answer Arc" (血染めプールの殺人 解決編, "Buraddi Pūru no Satsujin Kaiketsu-hen"); 4. "Ghost School Murder Case Question Arc 1" (亡霊学校殺人事件 問題編1, "Bōrei Gakkō Satsujin Jiken Mondai-hen Ichi"); 5. "Ghost School Murder Case Question Arc 2" (亡霊学校殺人事件 問題編2, "Bōrei Gakkō Satsujin Jiken Mondai-hen Ni"); 6. "Ghost School Murder Case Question Arc 3" (亡霊学校殺人事件 問題編3, "Bōrei Gakkō Satsujin Jiken Mondai-hen San"); 7. "Ghost School Murder Case Answer Arc 1" (亡霊学校殺人事件 解決編1, "Bōrei Gakkō Satsujin Jiken Kaiketsu-hen Ichi"); 8. "Ghost School Murder Case Answer Arc 2" (亡霊学校殺人事件 解決編2, "Bōrei Gakkō Satsujin Jiken Kaiketsu-hen Ni"); 9. "Mystery of Instant Disappearance Question Arc" (瞬間消失の謎 問題編, Shunkan Shōshitsu no Nazo Mondai-hen"); 10. "Mystery of Instant Disappearance Answer Arc" (瞬間消失の謎 解決編, "Shunkan Shōshitsu no Nazo Kaiketsu-hen")
6	Young Kindaichi's Reminiscence; Kindaichi Shōnen no Kaisō (金田一少年の回想)	October 17, 2000	978-4-0633-4343-4
1. "Challenge from the Gentleman Thief Question Arc 1" (怪盗紳士からの挑戦状 問題編1, "Kaitō Shinshi Kara no Chōsenjō Mondai-hen Ichi"); 2. "Challenge from the Gentleman Thief Question Arc 2" (怪盗紳士からの挑戦状 問題編2, "Kaitō Shinshi Kara no Chōsenjō Mondai-hen Ni"); 3. "Challenge from the Gentleman Thief Answer Arc" (怪盗紳士からの挑戦状 解決編, "Kaitō Shinshi Kara no Chōsenjō Kaiketsu-hen"); 4. "Gunshots at 04:40 a.m. Question Arc" (午前04:40の銃声 問題編, "Gozen Yoji Yonjuppun no Jūsei Mondai-hen"); 5. "Gunshots at 04:40 a.m. Answer Arc" (午前04:40の銃声 解決編, "Gozen Yoji Yonjuppun no Jūsei Kaiketsu-hen"); 6. "Bee Poisonous Sword Murder Case Question Arc 1" (妖刀毒蜂殺人事件 問題編1, "Yōtō Dokubachi Satsujin Jiken Mondai-hen Ichi"); 7. "Bee Poisonous Sword Murder Case Question Arc 2" (妖刀毒蜂殺人事件 問題編2, "Yōtō Dokubachi Satsujin Jiken Mondai-hen Ni"); 8. "Bee Poisonous Sword Murder Case Answer Arc" (妖刀毒蜂殺人事件 解決編, "Yōtō Dokubachi Satsujin Jiken Kaiketsu-hen"); 9. "Female Doctor's Bizarre Plot Question Arc" (女医の奇妙な企み 問題編, "Joi no Kimyō na Takurami Mondai-hen"); 10. "Female Doctor's Bizarre Plot Answer Arc" (女医の奇妙な企み 解決編, "Joi no Kimyō na Takurami Kaiketsu-hen")

=== Case series ===
No.	Title	Japanese release date	Japanese ISBN
1	Case 1 Murder in the Forest of the Demon Dog; Kēsu Ichi Maken no Mori no Satsujin (Case1 魔犬の森の殺人)	May 15, 1998	978-4-0631-2551-1
File 20: 1. Prologue (プロローグ, Purorōgu); 2. Chapter 1 Its Name is Cerberus (第1章 その名は「ケルベロス」, Dai Isshō Sono Na wa Keruberosu); 3. Chapter 2 Howling of the Demon Dog (第2章 魔犬咆哮, Dai Ni Shō Maken Hōkō); 4. Chapter 3 Inside the Unlucky Cage (第3章 禍々しき檻の中で, Dai San Shō Wazawaiwazawaishiki Ori no Naka de); 5. Chapter 4 Judgment Night (第4章 裁きの夜, Dai Yon Shō Sabaki no Yoru); 6. Chapter 5 Fruit's Dying Message (第5章 フルーツ・ダイイングメッセージ, Dai Go Shō Furūtsu Daiingu Messēji); 7. Chapter 6 Truth 1 – Language of Fruit (第6章 真相1 – 果実はかく語りき, Dai Rosshō Shinsō Ichi – Kajitsu wa Kakukatariki); 8. Chapter 7 Truth 2 – Distorted Alibi (第7章 真相2 – 歪められたアリバイ, Dai Nana Shō Shinsō Ni – Hizumerareta Aribai); 9. Chapter 8 Limited Lifetime (第8章 限りある生命の刻を, Dai Hasshō Kagiri Aru Seimei no Koku o); 10. Epilogue (エピローグ, Epirōgu)
2	Case 2 Demon Killer of Silver Screen; Kēsu Ni Ginmaku no Satsujinki (Case2 銀幕の殺人鬼)	October 16, 1998	978-4-0631-2612-9
File 21: 1. Prologue (プロローグ, Purorōgu); 2. Chapter 1 Scorpion's Blade (第1章 「スコーピオン」の刃, Dai Isshō Sukōpion no Yaiba); 3. Chapter 2 Forbidden Film (第2章 禁断のフィルム, Dai Ni Shō Kindan no Firumu); 4. Chapter 3 Another Man (第3章 もうひとりの男, Dai San Shō Mō Hitori no Otoko); 5. Chapter 4 After Making Confession (第4章 告白の後に, Dai Yon Shō Kokuhaku no Ato ni); 6. Chapter 5 Why Poirot is Barking? (第5章 なぜポアロは吠えたのか？, Dai Go Shō Naze Poaro wa Hoeta no ka?); 7. Chapter 6 Truth 1 – Magic of Mathematical Expression (第6章 真相1 – 数式のマジック, Dai Rosshō Shinsō Ichi – Sūshiki no Majikku); 8. Chapter 7 Truth 2 – Escape from the Double Locked Room (第7章 真相2 —「二重密室」を越えて, Dai Nana Shō Shinsō Ni – Nijū Misshitsu o Koete); 9. Epilogue (エピローグ, Epirōgu)
3	Case 3 Amakusa Treasure Legend Murder Case (First Part); Kēsu San Amakusa Zaihō Densetsu Sastujin Jiken (Jō) (Case 3 天草財宝伝説殺人事件（上）)	February 17, 1999	978-4-0631-2659-4
File 22: 1. Prologue (プロローグ, Purorōgu); 2. Chapter 1 People Who Gather in Amakusa (第1章 天草に集いし者たち, Dai Isshō Amakusa ni Tsudoishi Mono-tachi); 3. Chapter 2 Introduction to Dowsing (第2章 ダウジング入門, Dai Ni Shō Daujingu Nyūmon); 4. Chapter 3 Wound on the Chest in the Shape of Cross (第3章 胸を十字に裂かれて, Dai San Shō Mune wo Jūji ni Sakarete); 5. Chapter 4 The Spell of the White Hair Demon (第4章 「白髪鬼」の呪縛, Dai Yon Shō Hakuhatsuki no Jubaku); 6. Chapter 5 Only Two Suspects (第5章 たった2人の容疑者, Dai Go Shō Tatta Futari no Yōgisha); 7. Chapter 6 Pleasure of Reunion (第6章 また会えたことの歓びを, Dai Rosshō Mata Aeta Koto no Yorokobi o); 8. Chapter 7 Utterly Not Forgiving (第7章 決して許しはしない, Dai Nana Shō Kesshite Yurushi wa Shinai); 9. Chapter 8 The Last Trap (第8章 最後の罠, Dai Hasshō Saigo no Wana)
4	Case 3 Amakusa Treasure Legend Murder Case (Second Part); Kēsu San Amakusa Zaihō Densetsu Sastujin Jiken (Ge) (Case 3 天草財宝伝説殺人事件（下）)	March 17, 1999	978-4-0631-2669-3
File 22: 10. Chapter 9 Truth 1 – The Thread Connecting Strangers (第9章 真相1 – 見知らぬ者をつなぐ糸, Dai Kyū Shō Shinsō Ichi – Mishiranu Mono wo Tsunagu Kei); 11. Chapter 10 Truth 2 – The Road which Floats Only in the Heart (第10章 真相2 – 心だけに浮かぶ道, Dai Jū Shō Shinsō Ni – Kokoro Dake ni Ukabu Michi); 12. Chapter 11 Seeking Death Wholeheartedly (第11章 ひたすらに死を求めて, Dai Jūisshō Hitasura ni Shi o Motomete); 13. Epilogue (エピローグ, Epirōgu); Young Akechi's Magnificent Case Files 2: 1. Young Akechi's Magnificent Case Files 2 Question Arc 1 (明智少年の華麗なる事件簿2 問題編1, Akechi Shōnen no Karei Naru Jikenbo Ni Mondai-hen Ichi); 2. Young Akechi's Magnificent Case Files 2 Question Arc 2 (明智少年の華麗なる事件簿2 問題編2, Akechi Shōnen no Karei Naru Jikenbo Ni Mondai-hen Ni); 3. Young Akechi's Magnificent Case Files 2 Answer Arc (明智少年の華麗なる事件簿2 解決編, Akechi Shōnen no Karei Naru Jikenbo Ni Kaiketsu-hen)
5	Case 4 Yukikage Village Murder Case; Kēsu Yon Yukikagemura Satsujin Jiken (Case 4 雪影村殺人事件)	August 17, 1999	978-4-0631-2730-0
File 23: 1. Prologue (プロローグ, Purorōgu); 2. Chapter 1 Cherry Blossom, Snow and the Time Capsule (第1章 桜と雪とタイムカプセル, Dai Isshō Sakura to Yuki to Taimu Kapuseru); 3. Chapter 2 The Killer Without Footprints (第2章 足跡なき殺人者, Dai Ni Shō Ashiatonaki Satsujinsha); 4. Chapter 3 Everyone Sees the Dream (第3章 誰もが夢を見ていた, Dai San Shō Dare mo ga Yume o Miteita); 5. Chapter 4 The Man Called Tatsuya Imai (第4章 「今井龍矢」という男, Dai Yon Shō Imai Tatsuya Toiu Otoko); 6. Chapter 5 The Dead is Lying in the Darkness (第5章 死者は暗闇の中で, Dai Go Shō Shisha wa Kurayami no Naka de); 7. Chapter 6 Truth 1 – Agonizing Allegation (第6章 真相1 – せつない告発, Dai Rosshō Shinsō Ichi – Setsunai Kokuhatsu); 8. Chapter 7 Truth 2 – Alibi Accompanies Snow (第7章 真相2 – アリバイは雪とともに, Dai Nana Shō Shinsō Ni – Aribai wa Yuki to Tomo ni); 9. Epilogue" (エピローグ, "Epirōgu)
6	Case 5 Russian Dolls Murder Case (First Part); Kēsu Go Roshia Ningyō Satsujin Jiken (Jō) (Case 5 露西亜人形殺人事件（上）)	March 16, 2000	978-4-0631-2814-7
File 24: 1. Prologue (プロローグ, Purorōgu); 2. Chapter 1 Quintet in the Fog (第1章 霧の中のクインテット, Dai Isshō Kiri no Naka no Kuintetto); 3. Chapter 2 Cryptanalysis Race Begins (第2章 暗号解読レース開始, Dai Ni Shō Angō Kaidoku Rēsu Kaishi); 4. Chapter 3 Cut the Head in Turn, Starting from the Front (第3章 前から順に首を刈られた, Dai San Shō Mae Kara Jun ni Kubi o Karareta); 5. Chapter 4 The Mansion Full of Tricks (第4章 トリックだらけの館, Dai Yon Shō Torikku Darake no Yakata); 6. Chapter 5 Removing Mask (第5章 仮面をはずして, Dai Go Shō Kamen o Hazushite); 7. Chapter 6 Conductor's Locked Room (第6章 「コンダクター」の密室, Dai Rosshō Kondakutā no Misshitsu); 8. Chapter 7 The Most Dangerous Gamble (第7章 もっとも危険な賭け, Dai Nana Shō Mottomo Kiken na Kake)
7	Case 5 Russian Dolls Murder Case (Second Part); Kēsu Go Roshia Ningyō Satsujin Jiken (Ge) (Case 5 露西亜人形殺人事件（下）)	April 14, 2000	978-4-0631-2828-4
File 24: 9. Chapter 8 Solving All Mysteries Ahead (第8章 すべての謎を先に解け, Dai Hasshō Subete no Nazo o Saki ni Toke); 10. Chapter 9 Like a Nightmare (第9章 まるで悪夢のような, Dai Kyū Shō Marude Akumu no Yō na); 11. Chapter 10 Truth 1 – Winner of the Race (第10章 真相1 – レースの勝者, Dai Jū Shō Shinsō Ichi – Rēsu no Shōsha); 12. Chapter 11 Truth 2 – Trap and Symphony of Reasoning (第11章 真相2 – 罠と推理の交響曲, Dai Jūisshō Shinsō Ni – Wana to Suiri no Kōkyōkyoku); 13. Chapter 12 Truth 3 – Unlocking the Key of Mind (第12章 真相3 – 「心理の鍵」を開く, Dai Jūni Shō Shinsō San – Shinri no Kagi o Hiraku); 14. Chapter 13 Piling Up the Past (第13章 過去を重ねて, Dai Jūsan Shō Kako o Kasanete); 15. Epilogue (エピローグ, Epirōgu)
8	Case 6 Bizarre Circus Murder; Kēsu Roku Kaiki Sākasu no Satsujin (Case 6 怪奇サーカスの殺人)	July 17, 2000	978-4-0631-2858-1
File 25: 1. Prologue (プロローグ, Purorōgu); 2. Chapter 1 The Coming Storm (第1章 嵐の訪れ, Dai Isshō Arashi no Otozure); 3. Chapter 2 Clown Without a Face (第2章 顔のないピエロ, Dai Ni Shō Kao no Nai Piero); 4. Chapter 3 Avenger Monster (第3章 復讐者「MONSTER」, Dai San Shō Fukushūsha Monsutā); 5. Chapter 4 Giant of Flame Disappears from the Locked Room (第4章 「炎の巨人」密室に消ゆ, Dai Yon Shō Honō no Kyojin Misshitsu ni Kiyu); 6. Chapter 5 Cleared Up Message (第5章 解き明かされたメッセージ, Dai Go Shō Toki Akiraka Sareta Messēji); 7. Chapter 6 Truth 1 – Induced Alibi (第6章 真相1 – 誘導されたアリバイ, Dai Rosshō Shinsō Ichi – Yūdō Sareta Aribai); 8. Chapter 7 Truth 2 – Locked Room Experiment Site's Optical Illusion Technique (第7章 真相2 —「密室実験場」の錯視術, Dai Nana Shō Shinsō Ni – Misshitsu Jikkenjō no Sakushi Jutsu); 9. Epilogue (エピローグ, Epirōgu)
9	Case 7 Young Kindaichi's Trip of Death Preparedness (First Part); Kēsu Nana Kindaichi Shōnen no Kesshikō (Jō) (Case 7 金田一少年の決死行（上）)	February 16, 2001	978-4-0631-2934-2
File 26: 1. Prologue (プロローグ, Purorōgu); 2. Chapter 1 Young Kindaichi, To Hong Kong (第1章 金田一少年 香港へ, Dai Isshō Kindaichi Shōnen Honkon e); 3. Chapter 2 That Hypnotic Technique is Dangerous (第2章 その催眠術は危険, Dai Ni Shō Sono Saiminjutsu wa Kiken); 4. Chapter 3 Witness of the Nightmare (第3章 悪夢の目撃者, Dai San Shō Akumu no Mokugekisha); 5. Chapter 4 Released Desire for Killing (第4章 解き放たれた殺人願望, Dai Yon Shō Tokihana Tareta Satsujin Ganhō); 6. Chapter 5 Escape and Then Sneak (第5章 脱出そして潜入, Dai Go Shō Dasshutsu Soshite Sennyū); 7. Chapter 6 The Revenge Plan of Gankutsuō (第6章 「巌窟王」復讐計画, Dai Rosshō Gankutsuō Fukushū Keikaku); 8. Chapter 7 Breakup (第7章 決裂, Dai Nana Shō Ketsuretsu)
10	Case 7 Young Kindaichi's Trip of Death Preparedness (Second Part); Kēsu Nana Kindaichi Shōnen no Kesshikō (Ge) (Case 7 金田一少年の決死行（下）)	February 16, 2001	978-4-0631-2935-9
File 26: 9. Chapter 8 Towards More Chaos... (第8章 さらなる混沌へ..., Dai Hasshō Saranaru Konton e...); 10. Chapter 9 Reunion and then Counterattack (第9章 再会そして反撃, Dai Kyū Shō Saikai Soshite Hangeki); 11. Chapter 10 No Mystery is Insoluble (第10章 解けない謎はない, Dai Jū Shō Tokenai Nazo wa Nai); 12. Chapter 11 Truth 1 – Fact and Lie's Kaleidoscope (第11章 真相1 – 事実と嘘の万華鏡, Dai Jūisshō Shinsō Ichi – Jijitsu to Uso no Mangekyō); 13. Chapter 12 Truth 2 – In Order To Survive in the Darkness (第12章 真相2 – 闇の中で生き抜くために, Dai Jūni Shō Shinsō Ni – Yami no Naka de Ikinuku Tameni); 14. Chapter 13 Truth 3 – The Sole Wish (第13章 真相3 – ただひとつの願い, Dai Jūsan Shō Shinsō San – Tada Hitotsu no Negai); 15. Chapter 14 Settlement (第14章 決着, Dai Jūyon Shō Ketchaku); 16. Grand Finale (グランドフィナーレ, Gurando Fināre)

=== Akechi File series ===
No.	Title	Japanese release date	Japanese ISBN
1	Young Akechi's Magnificent Case Files (3 Akechi Files); Akechi Shōnen no Karei Naru Jikenbo (明智少年の華麗なる事件簿)	February 17, 2000	978-4-0633-4280-2
1. "File 1 The First Case of Young Akechi/Alternative title: Farewell, My Dear Friend" (FILE1 明智少年最初の事件, "Fairu Ichi Akechi Shōnen Saisho no Jiken"); 2. "File 2 Quartet with Intent to Kill/Alternative title: The Perfect Violinist, Akechi" (FILE2 殺意の四重奏, "Fairu Ni Satsui no Karutetto"); 3. "File 3 Ghost Swordsman Murder Case/Alternative title: The Pride Murder" (FILE3 幽霊剣士殺人事件, "Fairu San Yūrei Kenshi Satsujin Jiken"); 4. "Special Story Kengo's Room" (スペシャルストーリー 健悟の部屋, "Supesharu Sutōrī Kengo no Heya")
2	Supt.Akechi's Pretty Case Files (4 Akechi Files); Akechi Keishi no Yūga Naru Jikenbo (明智警視の優雅なる事件簿)	May 17, 2000	978-4-0633-4303-8
1. "File 1 Testimony Puzzle/Alternative title: The Murder Train" (FILE1 証言パズル, "Fairu Ichi Shōgen Pazuru"); 2. "File 2 Killing Poker/Alternative title: Unlucky Men in the Rain" (FILE2 殺人ポーカー, "Fairu Ni Satsujin Pōkā"); 3. "File 3 Dead Person's Checkmate/Alternative title: The Great Chess Player, Akechi" (FILE3 死者のチェックメイト, "Fairu San Shisha no Chekkumeito"); 4. "File 4 Ghost Hotel Murder Case/Alternative title: The Encounter" (FILE 4 幽霊ホテル殺人事件, "Fairu Yon Yūrei Hoteru Satsujin Jiken"); 5. "Special Story Supt.Akechi Morning's Pretty Scenery" (スペシャルストーリー 明智警視 優雅なる朝の風景, "Supesharu Sutōrī Akechi Keishi Yūga Naru Asa no Fūkei")

=== New series ===
No.	Title	Japanese release date	Japanese ISBN
1	Vampire Legend Murder Case; Vanpaia Densetsu Satsujin Jiken (吸血鬼伝説殺人事件)	December 17, 2004	978-4-0636-3468-6
File 27: 1. Vampire Legend Murder Case 1 (吸血鬼伝説殺人事件①, Vanpaia Densetsu Satsujin Jiken Ichi); 2. Vampire Legend Murder Case 2 (吸血鬼伝説殺人事件②, Vanpaia Densetsu Satsujin Jiken Ni); 3. Vampire Legend Murder Case 3 (吸血鬼伝説殺人事件③, Vanpaia Densetsu Satsujin Jiken San); 4. Vampire Legend Murder Case 4 (吸血鬼伝説殺人事件④, Vanpaia Densetsu Satsujin Jiken Yon); 5. Vampire Legend Murder Case 5 (吸血鬼伝説殺人事件⑤, Vanpaia Densetsu Satsujin Jiken Go); 6. Vampire Legend Murder Case 6 (吸血鬼伝説殺人事件⑥, Vanpaia Densetsu Satsujin Jiken Roku); 7. Vampire Legend Murder Case 7 (吸血鬼伝説殺人事件⑦, Vanpaia Densetsu Satsujin Jiken Nana); 8. Vampire Legend Murder Case Final (吸血鬼伝説殺人事件終, Vanpaia Densetsu Satsujin Jiken Saishū)
2	Opera House The Third Murder (First Part); Opera-za Kan Daisan no Satsujin (Jō) (オペラ座館・第三の殺人（上）)	March 17, 2006	978-4-0636-3648-2
File 28: 1. Opera House The Third Murder 1 (オペラ座館・第三の殺人①, Operazakan Daisan no Satsujin Ichi); 2. Opera House The Third Murder 2 (オペラ座館・第三の殺人②, Operazakan Daisan no Satsujin Ni); 3. Opera House The Third Murder 3 (オペラ座館・第三の殺人③, Operazakan Daisan no Satsujin San); 4. Opera House The Third Murder 4 (オペラ座館・第三の殺人④, Operazakan Daisan no Satsujin Yon); 5. Opera House The Third Murder 5 (オペラ座館・第三の殺人⑤, Operazakan Daisan no Satsujin Go); 6. Opera House The Third Murder 6 (オペラ座館・第三の殺人⑥, Operazakan Daisan no Satsujin Roku); 7. Opera House The Third Murder 7 (オペラ座館・第三の殺人⑦, Operazakan Daisan no Satsujin Nana)
3	Opera House The Third Murder (Second Part); Opera-za Kan Daisan no Satsujin (Ge) (オペラ座館・第三の殺人（下）)	March 17, 2006	978-4-0636-3649-9
File 28: 8. Opera House The Third Murder 8 (オペラ座館・第三の殺人⑧, Operazakan Daisan no Satsujin Hachi); 9. Opera House The Third Murder 9 (オペラ座館・第三の殺人⑨, Operazakan Daisan no Satsujin Kyū); 10. Opera House The Third Murder 10 (オペラ座館・第三の殺人⑩, Operazakan Daisan no Satsujin Jū); 11. Opera House The Third Murder 11 (オペラ座館・第三の殺人⑪, Operazakan Daisan no Satsujin Jūichi); 12. Opera House The Third Murder 12 (オペラ座館・第三の殺人⑫, Operazakan Daisan no Satsujin Jūni); 13. Opera House The Third Murder 13 (オペラ座館・第三の殺人⑬, Operazakan Daisan no Satsujin Jūsan); 14. Opera House The Third Murder 14 (オペラ座館・第三の殺人⑭, Operazakan Daisan no Satsujin Jūyon); 15. Opera House The Third Murder Final (オペラ座館・第三の殺人終, Operazakan Daisan no Satsujin Saishū)
4	Jail Gate Cram School Murder Case (First Part); Gokumonjuku Satsujin Jiken (Jō) (獄門塾殺人事件（上）)	November 17, 2006	978-4-0636-3755-7
File 29: 1. Jail Gate Cram School Murder Case 1 (獄門塾殺人事件①, Gokumonjuku Satsujin Jiken Ichi); 2. Jail Gate Cram School Murder Case 2 (獄門塾殺人事件②, Gokumonjuku Satsujin Jiken Ni); 3. Jail Gate Cram School Murder Case 3 (獄門塾殺人事件③, Gokumonjuku Satsujin Jiken San); 4. Jail Gate Cram School Murder Case 4 (獄門塾殺人事件④, Gokumonjuku Satsujin Jiken Yon); 5. Jail Gate Cram School Murder Case 5 (獄門塾殺人事件⑤, Gokumonjuku Satsujin Jiken Go); 6. Jail Gate Cram School Murder Case 6 (獄門塾殺人事件⑥, Gokumonjuku Satsujin Jiken Roku); 7. Jail Gate Cram School Murder Case 7 (獄門塾殺人事件⑦, Gokumonjuku Satsujin Jiken Nana)
5	Jail Gate Cram School Murder Case (Second Part); Gokumonjuku Satsujin Jiken (Ge) (獄門塾殺人事件（下）)	November 17, 2006	978-4-0636-3756-4
File 29: 8. Jail Gate Cram School Murder Case 8 (獄門塾殺人事件⑧, Gokumonjuku Satsujin Jiken Hachi); 9. Jail Gate Cram School Murder Case 9 (獄門塾殺人事件⑨, Gokumonjuku Satsujin Jiken Kyū); 10. Jail Gate Cram School Murder Case 10 (獄門塾殺人事件⑩, Gokumonjuku Satsujin Jiken Jū); 11. Jail Gate Cram School Murder Case 11 (獄門塾殺人事件⑪, Gokumonjuku Satsujin Jiken Jūichi); 12. Jail Gate Cram School Murder Case 12 (獄門塾殺人事件⑫, Gokumonjuku Satsujin Jiken Jūni); 13. Jail Gate Cram School Murder Case 13 (獄門塾殺人事件⑬, Gokumonjuku Satsujin Jiken Jūsan); 14. Jail Gate Cram School Murder Case 14 (獄門塾殺人事件⑭, Gokumonjuku Satsujin Jiken Jūyon); 15. Jail Gate Cram School Murder Case Final (獄門塾殺人事件終, Gokumonjuku Satsujin Jiken Saishū)
6	Snow Spirit Legend Murder Case (First Part); Yukiryō Densetsu Satsujin Jiken (Jō) (雪霊伝説殺人事件（上）)	July 17, 2007	978-4-0636-3860-8
File 30: 1. Snow Spirit Legend Murder Case 1 (雪霊伝説殺人事件①, Yukiryō Densetsu Satsujin Jiken Ichi); 2. Snow Spirit Legend Murder Case 2 (雪霊伝説殺人事件②, Yukiryō Densetsu Satsujin Jiken Ni); 3. Snow Spirit Legend Murder Case 3 (雪霊伝説殺人事件③, Yukiryō Densetsu Satsujin Jiken San); 4. Snow Spirit Legend Murder Case 4 (雪霊伝説殺人事件④, Yukiryō Densetsu Satsujin Jiken Yon); 5. Snow Spirit Legend Murder Case 5 (雪霊伝説殺人事件⑤, Yukiryō Densetsu Satsujin Jiken Go); 6. Snow Spirit Legend Murder Case 6 (雪霊伝説殺人事件⑥, Yukiryō Densetsu Satsujin Jiken Roku); 7. Snow Spirit Legend Murder Case 7 (雪霊伝説殺人事件⑦, Yukiryō Densetsu Satsujin Jiken Nana)
7	Snow Spirit Legend Murder Case (Second Part); Yukiryō Densetsu Satsujin Jiken (Ge) (雪霊伝説殺人事件（下）)	July 17, 2007	978-4-0636-3861-5
File 30: 8. Snow Spirit Legend Murder Case 8 (雪霊伝説殺人事件⑧, Yukiryō Densetsu Satsujin Jiken Hachi); 9. Snow Spirit Legend Murder Case 9 (雪霊伝説殺人事件⑨, Yukiryō Densetsu Satsujin Jiken Kyū); 10. Snow Spirit Legend Murder Case 10 (雪霊伝説殺人事件⑩, Yukiryō Densetsu Satsujin Jiken Jū); 11. Snow Spirit Legend Murder Case 11 (雪霊伝説殺人事件⑪, Yukiryō Densetsu Satsujin Jiken Jūichi); 12. Snow Spirit Legend Murder Case 12 (雪霊伝説殺人事件⑫, Yukiryō Densetsu Satsujin Jiken Jūni); 13. Snow Spirit Legend Murder Case Final (雪霊伝説殺人事件終, Yukiryō Densetsu Satsujin Jiken Saishū); Reika Hayami and the Uninvited Guest: 1. Reika Hayami and the Uninvited Guest Part One (速水玲香と招かれざる客 前編, Hayami Reika to Manekarezaru Kyaku Zenpen); 2. Reika Hayami and the Uninvited Guest Part Two (速水玲香と招かれざる客 後編, Hayami Reika to Manekarezaru Kyaku Kōhen)
8	Chidamari's Room Murder Case Fudo High School Festival Murder Case; Chidamari no Ma Satsujin Jiken Fudō Kōkō Gakuensai Satsujin Jiken (血溜之間殺人事件・不動高校学園祭殺人事件)	August 12, 2008	978-4-0638-4032-2
Chidamari's Room Murder Case: 1. Chidamari's Room Murder Case 1 (血溜之間殺人事件①, Chidamari no Ma Satsujin Jiken Ichi); 2. Chidamari's Room Murder Case 2 (血溜之間殺人事件②, Chidamari no Ma Satsujin Jiken Ni); 3. Chidamari's Room Murder Case 3 (血溜之間殺人事件③, Chidamari no Ma Satsujin Jiken San); 4. Chidamari's Room Murder Case Final (血溜之間殺人事件終, Chidamari no Ma Satsujin Jiken Saishū); Fudo High School Festival Murder: 1. Fudo High School Festival Murder Case 1 (不動高校学園祭殺人事件①, Fudō Kōkō Gakuensai Satsujin Jiken Ichi); 2. Fudo High School Festival Murder Case 2 (不動高校学園祭殺人事件②, Fudō Kōkō Gakuensai Satsujin Jiken Ni); 3. Fudo High School Festival Murder Case 3 (不動高校学園祭殺人事件③, Fudō Kōkō Gakuensai Satsujin Jiken San); 4. Fudo High School Festival Murder Case Final (不動高校学園祭殺人事件終, Fudō Kōkō Gakuensai Satsujin Jiken Saishū)
9	Black Magic Murder Case; Kuromajutsu Satsujin Jiken (黒魔術殺人事件)	August 12, 2008	978-4-0638-4031-5
File 31: 1. Black Magic Murder Case 1 (黒魔術殺人事件①, Kuromajutsu Satsujin Jiken Ichi); 2. Black Magic Murder Case 2 (黒魔術殺人事件②, Kuromajutsu Satsujin Jiken Ni); 3. Black Magic Murder Case 3 (黒魔術殺人事件③, Kuromajutsu Satsujin Jiken San); 4. Black Magic Murder Case 4 (黒魔術殺人事件④, Kuromajutsu Satsujin Jiken Yon); 5. Black Magic Murder Case 5 (黒魔術殺人事件⑤, Kuromajutsu Satsujin Jiken Go); 6. Black Magic Murder Case 6 (黒魔術殺人事件⑥, Kuromajutsu Satsujin Jiken Roku); 7. Black Magic Murder Case 7 (黒魔術殺人事件⑦, Kuromajutsu Satsujin Jiken Nana); 8. Black Magic Murder Case Final (黒魔術殺人事件終, Kuromajutsu Satsujin Jiken Saishū)
10	Murder Committed by Inspector Kenmochi (First Part); Kenmochi Keibu no Satsujin (Jō) (剣持警部の殺人（上）)	October 16, 2009	978-4-0638-4202-9
File 32: 1. Murder Committed by Inspector Kenmochi 1 (剣持警部の殺人①, Kenmochi Keibu no Satsujin Ichi); 2. Murder Committed by Inspector Kenmochi 2 (剣持警部の殺人②, Kenmochi Keibu no Satsujin Ni); 3. Murder Committed by Inspector Kenmochi 3 (剣持警部の殺人③, Kenmochi Keibu no Satsujin San); 4. Murder Committed by Inspector Kenmochi 4 (剣持警部の殺人④, Kenmochi Keibu no Satsujin Yon); 5. Murder Committed by Inspector Kenmochi 5 (剣持警部の殺人⑤, Kenmochi Keibu no Satsujin Go); 6. Murder Committed by Inspector Kenmochi 6 (剣持警部の殺人⑥, Kenmochi Keibu no Satsujin Roku); 7. Murder Committed by Inspector Kenmochi 7 (剣持警部の殺人⑦, Kenmochi Keibu no Satsujin Nana); 8. Murder Committed by Inspector Kenmochi 8 (剣持警部の殺人⑧, Kenmochi Keibu no Satsujin Hachi)
11	Murder Committed by Inspector Kenmochi (Second Part); Kenmochi Keibu no Satsujin (Ge) (剣持警部の殺人（下）)	October 16, 2009	978-4-0638-4203-6
File 32: 9. Murder Committed by Inspector Kenmochi 9 (剣持警部の殺人⑨, Kenmochi Keibu no Satsujin Kyū); 10. Murder Committed by Inspector Kenmochi 10 (剣持警部の殺人⑩, Kenmochi Keibu no Satsujin Jū); 11. Murder Committed by Inspector Kenmochi 11 (剣持警部の殺人⑪, Kenmochi Keibu no Satsujin Jūichi); 12. Murder Committed by Inspector Kenmochi Final (剣持警部の殺人終, Kenmochi Keibu no Satsujin Saishū); The Kindaichi Case Files Junior High School Student Chapter: 1. The Kindaichi Case Files Junior High School Student Chapter Diving Pool's Evil Spirit (金田一少年の事件簿 中学生編 飛込プールの悪霊, Kindaichi Shōnen no Jikenbo Chūgakusei-hen Tobikomi Pūru no Akuryō); 2. The Kindaichi Case Files Junior High School Student Chapter Campsite's Mysterious Event (金田一少年の事件簿 中学生編 キャンプ場の"怪"事件, Kindaichi Shōnen no Jikenbo Chūgakusei-hen Kyanpujō no Kaijiken)
12	Alchemy Murder Case (First Part); Renkinjutsu Satsujin Jiken (Jō) (錬金術殺人事件（上）)	November 17, 2010	978-4-0638-4405-4
File 33: 1. Alchemy Murder Case 1 (錬金術殺人事件①, Renkinjutsu Satsujin Jiken Ichi); 2. Alchemy Murder Case 2 (錬金術殺人事件②, Renkinjutsu Satsujin Jiken Ni); 3. Alchemy Murder Case 3 (錬金術殺人事件③, Renkinjutsu Satsujin Jiken San); 4. Alchemy Murder Case 4 (錬金術殺人事件④, Renkinjutsu Satsujin Jiken Yon); 5. Alchemy Murder Case 5 (錬金術殺人事件⑤, Renkinjutsu Satsujin Jiken Go); 6. Alchemy Murder Case 6 (錬金術殺人事件⑥, Renkinjutsu Satsujin Jiken Roku); 7. Alchemy Murder Case 7 (錬金術殺人事件⑦, Renkinjutsu Satsujin Jiken Nana); 8. Alchemy Murder Case 8 (錬金術殺人事件⑧, Renkinjutsu Satsujin Jiken Hachi)
13	Alchemy Murder Case (Second Part); Renkinjutsu Satsujin Jiken (Ge) (錬金術殺人事件（下）)	November 17, 2010	978-4-0638-4406-1
File 33: 9. Alchemy Murder Case 9 (錬金術殺人事件⑨, Renkinjutsu Satsujin Jiken Kyū); 10. Alchemy Murder Case 10 (錬金術殺人事件⑩, Renkinjutsu Satsujin Jiken Jū); 11. Alchemy Murder Case 11 (錬金術殺人事件⑪, Renkinjutsu Satsujin Jiken Jūichi); 12. Alchemy Murder Case 12 (錬金術殺人事件⑫, Renkinjutsu Satsujin Jiken Jūni); 13. Alchemy Murder Case Final (錬金術殺人事件終, Renkinjutsu Satsujin Jiken Saishū); Murder at 10000 Metre Altitude: 1. Murder at 10000 Metre Altitude 1 (高度1万メートルの殺人①, Kōdo Ichiman Mētoru no Satsujin Ichi); 2. Murder at 10000 Metre Altitude 2 (高度1万メートルの殺人②, Kōdo Ichiman Mētoru no Satsujin Ni); 3. Murder at 10000 Metre Altitude Final (高度1万メートルの殺人終, Kōdo Ichiman Mētoru no Satsujin Saishū)
14	House of Games Murder Case; Gēmu no Yakata Satsujin Jiken (ゲームの館殺人事件)	August 17, 2011	978-4-0638-4544-0
File 34: 1. House of Games Murder Case 1 (ゲームの館殺人事件①, Gēmu no Yakata Satsujin Jiken Ichi); 2. House of Games Murder Case 2 (ゲームの館殺人事件②, Gēmu no Yakata Satsujin Jiken Ni); 3. House of Games Murder Case 3 (ゲームの館殺人事件③, Gēmu no Yakata Satsujin Jiken San); 4. House of Games Murder Case 4 (ゲームの館殺人事件④, Gēmu no Yakata Satsujin Jiken Yon); 5. House of Games Murder Case 5 (ゲームの館殺人事件⑤, Gēmu no Yakata Satsujin Jiken Go); 6. House of Games Murder Case 6 (ゲームの館殺人事件⑥, Gēmu no Yakata Satsujin Jiken Roku); 7. House of Games Murder Case 7 (ゲームの館殺人事件⑦, Gēmu no Yakata Satsujin Jiken Nana); 8. House of Games Murder Case Final (ゲームの館殺人事件終, Gēmu no Yakata Satsujin Jiken Saishū)

=== 20th Anniversary series ===
No.	Title	Original release date	English release date
1	Kindaichi Case Files 20th Anniversary 1 Kindaichi Shōnen no Jikenbo Nijū Shūnenkinen Shirīzu Ichi (金田一少年の事件簿 20周年記念シリーズ (1))	June 15, 2012	978-4-06-384697-3
File 35: 1. Human-Eater Laboratory Murder Case 1 (人喰い研究所殺人事件①, Hitokui Rabo Satsujin Jiken Ichi); 2. Human-Eater Laboratory Murder Case 2 (人喰い研究所殺人事件②, Hitokui Rabo Satsujin Jiken Ni); 3. Human-Eater Laboratory Murder Case 3 (人喰い研究所殺人事件③, Hitokui Rabo Satsujin Jiken San); 4. Human-Eater Laboratory Murder Case 4 (人喰い研究所殺人事件④, "Hitokui Rabo Satsujin Jiken Yon"); 5. Human-Eater Laboratory Murder Case 5 (人喰い研究所殺人事件⑤, Hitokui Rabo Satsujin Jiken Go); 6. Human-Eater Laboratory Murder Case 6 (人喰い研究所殺人事件⑥, Hitokui Rabo Satsujin Jiken Roku); 7. Human-Eater Laboratory Murder Case 7 (人喰い研究所殺人事件⑦, Hitokui Rabo Satsujin Jiken Nana); 8. Human-Eater Laboratory Murder Case 8 (人喰い研究所殺人事件⑧, Hitokui Rabo Satsujin Jiken Hachi)
2	Kindaichi Case Files 20th Anniversary 2 Kindaichi Shōnen no Jikenbo Nijū Shūnenkinen Shirīzu Ni (金田一少年の事件簿 20周年記念シリーズ (2))	October 17, 2012	978-4-06-384756-7
File 35: 9. Human-Eater Laboratory Murder Case 9 (人喰い研究所殺人事件⑨, Hitokui Rabo Satsujin Jiken Kyū); 10. Human-Eater Laboratory Murder Case 10 (人喰い研究所殺人事件⑩, Hitokui Rabo Satsujin Jiken Jū); 11. Human-Eater Laboratory Murder Case Final (人喰い研究所殺人事件終, Hitokui Rabo Satsujin Jiken Saishū); File 36: 1. Kowloon Hong Kong Treasure Murder Case 1 (香港九龍財宝殺人事件①, Honkon Kūron Zaihō Satsujin Jiken Ichi); 2. Kowloon Hong Kong Treasure Murder Case 2 (香港九龍財宝殺人事件②, Honkon Kūron Zaihō Satsujin Jiken Ni); 3. Kowloon Hong Kong Treasure Murder Case 3 (香港九龍財宝殺人事件③, Honkon Kūron Zaihō Satsujin Jiken San); 4. Kowloon Hong Kong Treasure Murder Case 4 (香港九龍財宝殺人事件④, Honkon Kūron Zaihō Satsujin Jiken Yon); 5. Kowloon Hong Kong Treasure Murder Case 5 (香港九龍財宝殺人事件⑤, Honkon Kūron Zaihō Satsujin Jiken Go)
3	Kindaichi Case Files 20th Anniversary 3 Kindaichi Shōnen no Jikenbo Nijū Shūnenkinen Shirīzu San (金田一少年の事件簿 20周年記念シリーズ (3))	December 17, 2012	978-4-06-384790-1
File 36: 6. Kowloon Hong Kong Treasure Murder Case 6 (香港九龍財宝殺人事件⑥, Honkon Kūron Zaihō Satsujin Jiken Roku); 7. Kowloon Hong Kong Treasure Murder Case 7 (香港九龍財宝殺人事件⑦, Honkon Kūron Zaihō Satsujin Jiken Nana); 8. Kowloon Hong Kong Treasure Murder Case 8 (香港九龍財宝殺人事件⑧, Honkon Kūron Zaihō Satsujin Jiken Hachi); 9. Kowloon Hong Kong Treasure Murder Case 9 (香港九龍財宝殺人事件⑨, Honkon Kūron Zaihō Satsujin Jiken Kyū); 10. Kowloon Hong Kong Treasure Murder Case 10 (香港九龍財宝殺人事件⑩, Honkon Kūron Zaihō Satsujin Jiken Jū); 11. Kowloon Hong Kong Treasure Murder Case 11 (香港九龍財宝殺人事件⑪, Honkon Kūron Zaihō Satsujin Jiken Jūichi); 12. Kowloon Hong Kong Treasure Murder Case Final (香港九龍財宝殺人事件終, Honkon Kūron Zaihō Satsujin Jiken Saishū); Dark Castle Murder Case: 1. Dark Castle Murder Case 1 (暗黒城殺人事件①, Ankoku Jō Satsujin Jiken Ichi)
4	Kindaichi Case Files 20th Anniversary 4 Kindaichi Shōnen no Jikenbo Nijū Shūnenkinen Shirīzu Yon (金田一少年の事件簿 20周年記念シリーズ (4))	March 15, 2013	978-4-06-384830-4
Dark Castle Murder Case: 2. Dark Castle Murder Case 2 (暗黒城殺人事件②, Ankoku Jō Satsujin Jiken Ni); 3. Dark Castle Murder Case Final (暗黒城殺人事件終, Ankoku Jō Satsujin Jiken Saishū); File 37: 1. Rose Cross Mansion Murder Case 1 (薔薇十字館殺人事件①, Barajūjikan Satsujin Jiken Ichi); 2. Rose Cross Mansion Murder Case 2 (薔薇十字館殺人事件②, Barajūjikan Satsujin Jiken Ni); 3. Rose Cross Mansion Murder Case 3 (薔薇十字館殺人事件③, Barajūjikan Satsujin Jiken San); 4. Rose Cross Mansion Murder Case 4 (薔薇十字館殺人事件④, Barajūjikan Satsujin Jiken Yon); 5. Rose Cross Mansion Murder Case 5 (薔薇十字館殺人事件⑤, Barajūjikan Satsujin Jiken Go); 6. Rose Cross Mansion Murder Case 6 (薔薇十字館殺人事件⑥, Barajūjikan Satsujin Jiken Roku)
5	Kindaichi Case Files 20th Anniversary 5 Kindaichi Shōnen no Jikenbo Nijū Shūnenkinen Shirīzu Go (金田一少年の事件簿 20周年記念シリーズ (5))	June 17, 2013	978-4-06-384883-0
File 37: 7. Rose Cross Mansion Murder Case 7 (薔薇十字館殺人事件⑦, Barajūjikan Satsujin Jiken Nana); 8. Rose Cross Mansion Murder Case 8 (薔薇十字館殺人事件⑧, Barajūjikan Satsujin Jiken Hachi); 9. Rose Cross Mansion Murder Case 9 (薔薇十字館殺人事件⑨, Barajūjikan Satsujin Jiken Kyū); 10. Rose Cross Mansion Murder Case 10 (薔薇十字館殺人事件⑩, Barajūjikan Satsujin Jiken Jū); 11. Rose Cross Mansion Murder Case 11 (薔薇十字館殺人事件⑪, Barajūjikan Satsujin Jiken Jūichi); 12. Rose Cross Mansion Murder Case 12 (薔薇十字館殺人事件⑫, Barajūjikan Satsujin Jiken Jūni); 13. Rose Cross Mansion Murder Case 13 (薔薇十字館殺人事件⑬, Barajūjikan Satsujin Jiken Jūsan); 14. Rose Cross Mansion Murder Case Final (薔薇十字館殺人事件終, Barajūjikan Satsujin Jiken Saishū)

=== R (Returns) series ===
No.	Title	Japanese release date	Japanese ISBN
1	Kindaichi Case Files Returns 1 Kindaichi Shōnen no Jikenbo Ritānzu Ichi (金田一少年の事件簿R (1))	March 17, 2014	978-4-06-395039-7
File 38: 1. Snow Goblin Legend Murder Case 1 (雪鬼伝説殺人事件1, Yukioni Densetsu Satsujin Jiken Ichi); 2. Snow Goblin Legend Murder Case 2 (雪鬼伝説殺人事件2, Yukioni Densetsu Satsujin Jiken Ni); 3. Snow Goblin Legend Murder Case 3 (雪鬼伝説殺人事件3, Yukioni Densetsu Satsujin Jiken San); 4. Snow Goblin Legend Murder Case 4 (雪鬼伝説殺人事件4, Yukioni Densetsu Satsujin Jiken Yon); 5. Snow Goblin Legend Murder Case 5 (雪鬼伝説殺人事件5, Yukioni Densetsu Satsujin Jiken Go); 6. Snow Goblin Legend Murder Case 6 (雪鬼伝説殺人事件6, Yukioni Densetsu Satsujin Jiken Roku); 7. Snow Goblin Legend Murder Case 7 (雪鬼伝説殺人事件7, Yukioni Densetsu Satsujin Jiken Nana); 8. Snow Goblin Legend Murder Case 8 (雪鬼伝説殺人事件8, Yukioni Densetsu Satsujin Jiken Hachi)
2	Kindaichi Case Files Returns 2 Kindaichi Shōnen no Jikenbo Ritānzu Ni (金田一少年の事件簿R (2))	July 17, 2014	978-4-06-395132-5
File 38: 9. Snow Goblin Legend Murder Case 9 (雪鬼伝説殺人事件9, Yukioni Densetsu Satsujin Jiken Kyū); 10. Snow Goblin Legend Murder Case 10 (雪鬼伝説殺人事件10, Yukioni Densetsu Satsujin Jiken Jū); 11. Snow Goblin Legend Murder Case Final (雪鬼伝説殺人事件終, Yukioni Densetsu Satsujin Jiken Saishū); File 39: 1. Ghost School Building Murders 1 (亡霊校舎の殺人1, Bōrei Kōsha no Satsujin Ichi); 2. Ghost School Building Murders 2 (亡霊校舎の殺人2, Bōrei Kōsha no Satsujin Ni); 3. Ghost School Building Murders 3 (亡霊校舎の殺人3, Bōrei Kōsha no Satsujin San); 4. Ghost School Building Murders 4 (亡霊校舎の殺人4, Bōrei Kōsha no Satsujin Yon); 5. Ghost School Building Murders 5 (亡霊校舎の殺人5, Bōrei Kōsha no Satsujin Go)
3	Kindaichi Case Files Returns 3 Kindaichi Shōnen no Jikenbo Ritānzu San (金田一少年の事件簿R (3))	September 17, 2014	978-4-06-395199-8
File 39: 6. Ghost School Building Murders 6 (亡霊校舎の殺人6, Bōrei Kōsha no Satsujin Roku); 7. Ghost School Building Murders 7 (亡霊校舎の殺人7, Bōrei Kōsha no Satsujin Nana); 8. Ghost School Building Murders 8 (亡霊校舎の殺人8, Bōrei Kōsha no Satsujin Hachi); 9. Ghost School Building Murders 9 (亡霊校舎の殺人9, Bōrei Kōsha no Satsujin Kyū); 10. Ghost School Building Murders 10 (亡霊校舎の殺人10, Bōrei Kōsha no Satsujin Jū); 11. Ghost School Building Murders 11 (亡霊校舎の殺人11, Bōrei Kōsha no Satsujin Jūichi); 12. Ghost School Building Murders Final (亡霊校舎の殺人終, "Bōrei Kōsha no Satsujin Saishū); File 40: 1. Drifting Firefox Murder Case 1 (狐火流し殺人事件1, Kitsunebi Nagashi Satsujin Jiken Ichi); 2. Drifting Firefox Murder Case 2 (狐火流し殺人事件2, Kitsunebi Nagashi Satsujin Jiken Ni)
4	Kindaichi Case Files Returns 4 Kindaichi Shōnen no Jikenbo Ritānzu Yon (金田一少年の事件簿R (4))	December 17, 2014	978-4-06-395271-1
File 40: 3. Drifting Firefox Murder Case 3 (狐火流し殺人事件3, Kitsunebi Nagashi Satsujin Jiken San); 4. Drifting Firefox Murder Case 4 (狐火流し殺人事件4, Kitsunebi Nagashi Satsujin Jiken Yon); 5. Drifting Firefox Murder Case 5 (狐火流し殺人事件5, Kitsunebi Nagashi Satsujin Jiken Go); 6. Drifting Firefox Murder Case 6 (狐火流し殺人事件6, Kitsunebi Nagashi Satsujin Jiken Roku); 7. Drifting Firefox Murder Case 7 (狐火流し殺人事件7, Kitsunebi Nagashi Satsujin Jiken Nana); 8. Drifting Firefox Murder Case 8 (狐火流し殺人事件8, Kitsunebi Nagashi Satsujin Jiken Hachi); 9. Drifting Firefox Murder Case 9 (狐火流し殺人事件9, Kitsunebi Nagashi Satsujin Jiken Kyū); 10. Drifting Firefox Murder Case 10 (狐火流し殺人事件10, Kitsunebi Nagashi Satsujin Jiken Jū); 11. Drifting Firefox Murder Case Final (狐火流し殺人事件終, Kitsunebi Nagashi Satsujin Jiken Saishū)
5	Kindaichi Case Files Returns 5 Kindaichi Shōnen no Jikenbo Ritānzu Go (金田一少年の事件簿R (5))	April 17, 2015	978-4-06-395369-5
Kengo Akechi's Student Case Files: 1. Kengo Akechi's Student Case Files 1 (学生明智健悟の事件簿1, Gakusei Akechi Kengo no Jikenbo Ichi); 2. Kengo Akechi's Student Case Files 2 (学生明智健悟の事件簿2, Gakusei Akechi Kengo no Jikenbo Ni); 3. Kengo Akechi's Student Case Files 3 (学生明智健悟の事件簿3, Gakusei Akechi Kengo no Jikenbo San); 4. Kengo Akechi's Student Case Files Final (学生明智健悟の事件簿終, Gakusei Akechi Kengo no Jikenbo Saishū); File 41: 1. Antlion Trench Murder Case 1 (蟻地獄壕殺人事件1, Arijigoku Gō Satsujin Jiken Ichi); 2. Antlion Trench Murder Case 2 (蟻地獄壕殺人事件2, Arijigoku Gō Satsujin Jiken Ni); 3. Antlion Trench Murder Case 3 (蟻地獄壕殺人事件3, Arijigoku Gō Satsujin Jiken San); 4. Antlion Trench Murder Case 4 (蟻地獄壕殺人事件4, Arijigoku Gō Satsujin Jiken Yon); 5. Antlion Trench Murder Case 5 (蟻地獄壕殺人事件5, Arijigoku Gō Satsujin Jiken Go)
6	Kindaichi Case Files Returns 6 Kindaichi Shōnen no Jikenbo Ritānzu Roku (金田一少年の事件簿R (6))	July 17, 2015	978-4-06-395420-3
File 41: 6. Antlion Trench Murder Case 6 (蟻地獄壕殺人事件6, Arijigoku Gō Satsujin Jiken Roku); 7. Antlion Trench Murder Case 7 (蟻地獄壕殺人事件7, Arijigoku Gō Satsujin Jiken Nana); 8. Antlion Trench Murder Case 8 (蟻地獄壕殺人事件8, Arijigoku Gō Satsujin Jiken Hachi); 9. Antlion Trench Murder Case 9 (蟻地獄壕殺人事件9, Arijigoku Gō Satsujin Jiken Kyū); 10. Antlion Trench Murder Case 10 (蟻地獄壕殺人事件10, Arijigoku Gō Satsujin Jiken Jū); 11. Antlion Trench Murder Case Final (蟻地獄壕殺人事件終, Arijigoku Gō Satsujin Jiken Saishū); File 42: 1. Bloodthirsty Cherry Blossom Murder Case 1 (吸血桜殺人事件1, Kyūketsuzakura Satsujin Jiken Ichi); 2. Bloodthirsty Cherry Blossom Murder Case 2 (吸血桜殺人事件2, Kyūketsuzakura Satsujin Jiken Ni); 3. Bloodthirsty Cherry Blossom Murder Case 3 (吸血桜殺人事件3, Kyūketsuzakura Satsujin Jiken San)
7	Kindaichi Case Files Returns 7 Kindaichi Shōnen no Jikenbo Ritānzu Nana (金田一少年の事件簿R (7))	September 17, 2015	978-4-06-395483-8
File 42: 4. Bloodthirsty Cherry Blossom Murder Case 4 (吸血桜殺人事件4, Kyūketsuzakura Satsujin Jiken Yon); 5. Bloodthirsty Cherry Blossom Murder Case 5 (吸血桜殺人事件5, Kyūketsuzakura Satsujin Jiken Go); 6. Bloodthirsty Cherry Blossom Murder Case 6 (吸血桜殺人事件6, Kyūketsuzakura Satsujin Jiken Roku); 7. Bloodthirsty Cherry Blossom Murder Case 7 (吸血桜殺人事件7, Kyūketsuzakura Satsujin Jiken Nana); 8. Bloodthirsty Cherry Blossom Murder Case 8 (吸血桜殺人事件8, Kyūketsuzakura Satsujin Jiken Hachi); 9. Bloodthirsty Cherry Blossom Murder Case 9 (吸血桜殺人事件9, Kyūketsuzakura Satsujin Jiken Kyū); 10. Bloodthirsty Cherry Blossom Murder Case 10 (吸血桜殺人事件10, Kyūketsuzakura Satsujin Jiken Jū); 11. Bloodthirsty Cherry Blossom Murder Case 11 (吸血桜殺人事件11, Kyūketsuzakura Satsujin Jiken Jūichi); 12. Bloodthirsty Cherry Blossom Murder Case Final (吸血桜殺人事件終, Kyūketsuzakura Satsujin Jiken Saishū)
8	Kindaichi Case Files Returns 8 Kindaichi Shōnen no Jikenbo Ritānzu Hachi (金田一少年の事件簿R (8))	January 15, 2016	978-4-06-395585-9
Why the Fireplace is Burning?: 1. Why the Fireplace is Burning? 1 (なぜ暖炉は燃えていたか？1, Naze Banro wa Moete ita ka Ichi); 2. Why the Fireplace is Burning? 2 (なぜ暖炉は燃えていたか？2, Naze Banro wa Moete ita ka Ni); 3. Why the Fireplace is Burning? Final (なぜ暖炉は燃えていたか？終, Naze Banro wa Moete ita ka Saishū); File 43: 1. Doll Island Murder Case 1 (人形島殺人事件1, Hitogata-jima Satsujin Jiken Ichi); 2. Doll Island Murder Case 2 (人形島殺人事件2, Hitogata-jima Satsujin Jiken Ni); 3. Doll Island Murder Case 3 (人形島殺人事件3, Hitogata-jima Satsujin Jiken San); 4. Doll Island Murder Case 4 (人形島殺人事件4, Hitogata-jima Satsujin Jiken Yon); 5. Doll Island Murder Case 5 (人形島殺人事件5, Hitogata-jima Satsujin Jiken Go); 6. Doll Island Murder Case 6 (人形島殺人事件6, Hitogata-jima Satsujin Jiken Roku)
9	Kindaichi Case Files Returns 9 Kindaichi Shōnen no Jikenbo Ritānzu Kyū (金田一少年の事件簿R (9))	March 17, 2016	978-4-06-395618-4
File 43: 7. Doll Island Murder Case 7 (人形島殺人事件7, Hitogata-jima Satsujin Jiken Nana); 8. Doll Island Murder Case 8 (人形島殺人事件8, Hitogata-jima Satsujin Jiken Hachi); 9. Doll Island Murder Case 9 (人形島殺人事件9, Hitogata-jima Satsujin Jiken Kyū); 10. Doll Island Murder Case 10 (人形島殺人事件10, Hitogata-jima Satsujin Jiken Jū); 11. Doll Island Murder Case 11 (人形島殺人事件11, Hitogata-jima Satsujin Jiken Jūichi); 12. Doll Island Murder Case 12 (人形島殺人事件12, Hitogata-jima Satsujin Jiken Jūni); 13. Doll Island Murder Case Final (人形島殺人事件終, Hitogata-jima Satsujin Jiken Saishū); Kengo Akeichi's Sommelier Case Files: 1. Kengo Akechi's Sommelier Case Files 1 (ソムリエ明智健悟の事件簿1, Somurie Akechi Kengo no Jikenbo Ichi); 2. Kengo Akechi's Sommelier Case Files 2 (ソムリエ明智健悟の事件簿2, Somurie Akechi Kengo no Jikenbo Ni)
10	Kindaichi Case Files Returns 10; Kindaichi Shōnen no Jikenbo Ritānzu Jū (金田一少年の事件簿R (10))	August 17, 2016	978-4-06-395740-2
Kengo Akeichi's Sommelier Case Files: 3. Kengo Akechi's Sommelier Case Files Final (ソムリエ明智健悟の事件簿終, Somurie Akechi Kengo no Jikenbo Saishū); File 44: 1. Black Spirit Hotel Murder Case 1 (黒霊ホテル殺人事件1, Kokuryō Hoteru Satsujin Jiken Ichi); 2. Black Spirit Hotel Murder Case 2 (黒霊ホテル殺人事件2, Kokuryō Hoteru Satsujin Jiken Ni); 3. Black Spirit Hotel Murder Case 3 (黒霊ホテル殺人事件3, Kokuryō Hoteru Satsujin Jiken San); 4. Black Spirit Hotel Murder Case 4 (黒霊ホテル殺人事件4, Kokuryō Hoteru Satsujin Jiken Yon); 5. Black Spirit Hotel Murder Case 5 (黒霊ホテル殺人事件5, Kokuryō Hoteru Satsujin Jiken Go); 6. Black Spirit Hotel Murder Case Final (黒霊ホテル殺人事件終, Kokuryō Hoteru Satsujin Jiken Saishū); File 45: 1. White Snake Sake Brewery Murder Case 1 (白蛇蔵殺人事件1, Shirohebi Gura Satsujin Jiken Ichi); 2. White Snake Sake Brewery Murder Case 2 (白蛇蔵殺人事件2, Shirohebi Gura Satsujin Jiken Ni)
11	Kindaichi Case Files Returns 11; Kindaichi Shōnen no Jikenbo Ritānzu Jūichi (金田一少年の事件簿R (11))	November 17, 2016	978-4-06-395798-3
File 45: 3. White Snake Sake Brewery Murder Case 3 (白蛇蔵殺人事件3, Shirohebi Gura Satsujin Jiken San); 4. White Snake Sake Brewery Murder Case 4 (白蛇蔵殺人事件4, Shirohebi Gura Satsujin Jiken Yon); 5. White Snake Sake Brewery Murder Case 5 (白蛇蔵殺人事件5, Shirohebi Gura Satsujin Jiken Go); 6. White Snake Sake Brewery Murder Case 6 (白蛇蔵殺人事件6, Shirohebi Gura Satsujin Jiken Roku); 7. White Snake Sake Brewery Murder Case 7 (白蛇蔵殺人事件7, Shirohebi Gura Satsujin Jiken Nana); 8. White Snake Sake Brewery Murder Case 8 (白蛇蔵殺人事件8, Shirohebi Gura Satsujin Jiken Hachi); 9. White Snake Sake Brewery Murder Case 9 (白蛇蔵殺人事件9, Shirohebi Gura Satsujin Jiken Kyū); 10. White Snake Sake Brewery Murder Case 10 (白蛇蔵殺人事件10, Shirohebi Gura Satsujin Jiken Jū); 11. White Snake Sake Brewery Murder Case Final (白蛇蔵殺人事件終, Shirohebi Gura Satsujin Jiken Saishū)
12	Kindaichi Case Files Returns 12; Kindaichi Shōnen no Jikenbo Ritānzu Jūni (金田一少年の事件簿R (12))	April 17, 2017	978-4-06-395917-8
File 46: 1. Sacred Love Island Murder Case 1 (聖恋島殺人事件1, Seiren-tō Satsujin Jiken Ichi); 2. Sacred Love Island Murder Case 2 (聖恋島殺人事件2, Seiren-tō Satsujin Jiken Ni); 3. Sacred Love Island Murder Case 3 (聖恋島殺人事件3, Seiren-tō Satsujin Jiken San); 4. Sacred Love Island Murder Case 4 (聖恋島殺人事件4, Seiren-tō Satsujin Jiken Yon); 5. Sacred Love Island Murder Case 5 (聖恋島殺人事件5, Seiren-tō Satsujin Jiken Go); 6. Sacred Love Island Murder Case 6 (聖恋島殺人事件6, Seiren-tō Satsujin Jiken Roku); 7. Sacred Love Island Murder Case 7 (聖恋島殺人事件7, Seiren-tō Satsujin Jiken Nana); 8. Sacred Love Island Murder Case 8 (聖恋島殺人事件8, Seiren-tō Satsujin Jiken Hachi); 9. Sacred Love Island Murder Case 9 (聖恋島殺人事件9, Seiren-tō Satsujin Jiken Kyū)
13	Kindaichi Case Files Returns 13; Kindaichi Shōnen no Jikenbo Ritānzu Jūsan (金田一少年の事件簿R (13))	September 15, 2017	978-4-06-510187-2
File 46: 10. Sacred Love Island Murder Case 10 (聖恋島殺人事件10, Seiren-tō Satsujin Jiken Jū); 11. Sacred Love Island Murder Case 11 (聖恋島殺人事件11, Seiren-tō Satsujin Jiken Jūichi); 12. Sacred Love Island Murder Case 12 (聖恋島殺人事件12, Seiren-tō Satsujin Jiken Jūni); 13. Sacred Love Island Murder Case 13 (聖恋島殺人事件13, Seiren-tō Satsujin Jiken Jūsan); 14. Sacred Love Island Murder Case 14 (聖恋島殺人事件14, Seiren-tō Satsujin Jiken Jūyon); 15. Sacred Love Island Murder Case Final (聖恋島殺人事件終, Seiren-tō Satsujin Jiken Saishū); File 47: 1. Fumi Kindaichi Kidnapping Murder Case 1 (金田一二三誘拐殺人事件1, Kindaichi Fumi Yūkai Satsujin Jiken Ichi); 2. Fumi Kindaichi Kidnapping Murder Case 2 (金田一二三誘拐殺人事件2, Kindaichi Fumi Yūkai Satsujin Jiken Ni); 3. Fumi Kindaichi Kidnapping Murder Case 3 (金田一二三誘拐殺人事件3, Kindaichi Fumi Yūkai Satsujin Jiken San)
14	Kindaichi Case Files Returns 14; Kindaichi Shōnen no Jikenbo Ritānzu Jūyon (金田一少年の事件簿R (14))	November 17, 2017	978-4-06-510396-8
File 47: 4. Fumi Kindaichi Kidnapping Murder Case 4 (金田一二三誘拐殺人事件4, Kindaichi Fumi Yūkai Satsujin Jiken Yon); 5. Fumi Kindaichi Kidnapping Murder Case 5 (金田一二三誘拐殺人事件5, Kindaichi Fumi Yūkai Satsujin Jiken Go); 6. Fumi Kindaichi Kidnapping Murder Case 6 (金田一二三誘拐殺人事件6, Kindaichi Fumi Yūkai Satsujin Jiken Roku); 7. Fumi Kindaichi Kidnapping Murder Case 7 (金田一二三誘拐殺人事件7, Kindaichi Fumi Yūkai Satsujin Jiken Nana); 8. Fumi Kindaichi Kidnapping Murder Case 8 (金田一二三誘拐殺人事件8, Kindaichi Fumi Yūkai Satsujin Jiken Hachi); 9. Fumi Kindaichi Kidnapping Murder Case 9 (金田一二三誘拐殺人事件9, Kindaichi Fumi Yūkai Satsujin Jiken Kyū); 10. Fumi Kindaichi Kidnapping Murder Case 10 (金田一二三誘拐殺人事件10, Kindaichi Fumi Yūkai Satsujin Jiken Jū); 11. Fumi Kindaichi Kidnapping Murder Case 11 (金田一二三誘拐殺人事件11, Kindaichi Fumi Yūkai Satsujin Jiken Jūichi); 12. Fumi Kindaichi Kidnapping Murder Case 12 (金田一二三誘拐殺人事件12, Kindaichi Fumi Yūkai Satsujin Jiken Jūni); 13. Fumi Kindaichi Kidnapping Murder Case Final (金田一二三誘拐殺人事件終, Kindaichi Fumi Yūkai Satsujin Jiken Saishū)

=== Takato Case Files ===
No.	Title	Japanese release date	Japanese ISBN
1	Takato Case Files; Takatō Shōnen no Jikenbo (高遠少年の事件簿)	May 9, 2014	978-4-06-395074-8
1. "Takato Case Files Chapter 1" (高遠少年の事件簿 第1話, "Takatō Shōnen no Jikenbo Dai Ichi Wa"); 2. "Takato Case Files Chapter 2" (高遠少年の事件簿 第2話, "Takatō Shōnen no Jikenbo Dai Ni Wa"); 3. "Takato Case Files Chapter 3" (高遠少年の事件簿 第3話, "Takatō Shōnen no Jikenbo Dai San Wa"); 4. "Takato Case Files Chapter 4" (高遠少年の事件簿 第4話, "Takatō Shōnen no Jikenbo Dai Yon Wa"); 5. "Takato Case Files Chapter 5" (高遠少年の事件簿 第5話, "Takatō Shōnen no Jikenbo Dai Go Wa"); 6. "Takato Case Files Chapter 6" (高遠少年の事件簿 第6話, "Takatō Shōnen no Jikenbo Dai Roku Wa"); 7. "Takato Case Files Chapter 7" (高遠少年の事件簿 第7話, "Takatō Shōnen no Jikenbo Dai Nana Wa")

=== Inspector Akechi Case Files ===
No.	Title	Japanese release date	Japanese ISBN
1	Inspector Akechi Case Files 1 Akechi Keibu no Jikenbo Ichi (明智警部の事件簿1)	December 17, 2014	978-4-06-395273-5
1. Young Boy's Retaliation 1 (少年の"仕返し"1, Shōnen no Shikaeshi Ichi); 2. Young Boy's Retaliation 2 (少年の"仕返し"2, Shōnen no Shikaeshi Ni); 3. Young Boy's Retaliation 3 (少年の"仕返し"3, Shōnen no Shikaeshi San); 4. Young Boy's Retaliation 4 (少年の"仕返し"4, Shōnen no Shikaeshi Yon); 1. Figure of Justice 1 (正義の姿1, Seigi no Sugata Ichi)
2	Inspector Akechi Case Files 2 Akechi Keibu no Jikenbo Ni (明智警部の事件簿2)	April 17, 2015	978-4-06-395374-9
2. Figure of Justice 2 (正義の姿2, Seigi no Sugata Ni); 3. Figure of Justice 3 (正義の姿3, Seigi no Sugata San); 4. Figure of Justice 4 (正義の姿4, Seigi no Sugata Yon); 1. Adored Policeman (憧れた警官, Akogareta Keikan); 1. Teared Bonds 1 (引き裂かれた絆1, Hikisakareta Kizuna Ichi); 2. Teared Bonds 2 (引き裂かれた絆2, Hikisakareta Kizuna Ni)
3	Inspector Akechi Case Files 3 Akechi Keibu no Jikenbo San (明智警部の事件簿3)	September 17, 2015	978-4-06-395492-0
3. Teared Bonds 3 (引き裂かれた絆3, Hikisakareta Kizuna San); 4. Teared Bonds 4 (引き裂かれた絆4, Hikisakareta Kizuna Yon); 5. Teared Bonds 5 (引き裂かれた絆5, Hikisakareta Kizuna Go); Extra: Cannot Across Rubicon River (渡らざるルビコン川, Watarazaru Rubikon Kawa): 1. Crooked Feeling 1 (歪められた想い1, Yugame Rareta Omoi Ichi); 2. Crooked Feeling 2 (歪められた想い2, Yugame Rareta Omoi Ni); Extra: Bacchus' Lie (バッカスの偽り, Bakkasu no Itsuwari)
4	Inspector Akechi Case Files 4 Akechi Keibu no Jikenbo Yon (明智警部の事件簿4)	March 17, 2016	978-4-06-395630-6
3. Crooked Feeling 3 (歪められた想い3, Yugame Rareta Omoi San); 1. Strange Observer (奇妙な観察者, Kimiyōna Kansatsu-sha); 1. Vagrant's Grief 1 (哀哭の放浪者1, Aikoku no Hōrō-sha Ichi); 2. Vagrant's Grief 2 (哀哭の放浪者2, Aikoku no Hōrō-sha Ni); 3. Vagrant's Grief 3 (哀哭の放浪者3, Aikoku no Hōrō-sha San); 1. Informer in a Fog 1 (五里霧中の密告者1, Gorimuchū no Mikkoku-sha Ichi)
5	Inspector Akechi Case Files 5 Akechi Keibu no Jikenbo Go (明智警部の事件簿5)	November 17, 2016	978-4-06-395741-9
2. Informer in a Fog 2 (五里霧中の密告者2, Gorimuchū no Mikoku-sha Ni); 3. Informer in a Fog 3 (五里霧中の密告者3, Gorimuchū no Mikoku-sha San); 1. In the Name of Justice 1 (正義の御名下に1, Seigi no o Myōge ni Ichi); 2. In the Name of Justice 2 (正義の御名下に2, Seigi no o Myōge ni Ni); 3. In the Name of Justice 3 (正義の御名下に3, Seigi no o Myōge ni San); 4. In the Name of Justice 4 (正義の御名下に4, Seigi no o Myōge ni Yon)

=== Age 37 series ===
No.	Title	Japanese release date	Japanese ISBN
1	Kindaichi Age 37 Case Files 1 Kindaichi Sanjūnana-sai no Jikenbo Ichi (金田一37歳の事件簿 (1))	June 15, 2018	978-4-06-511687-6
File 1: Uta Island Resort Murder Case (歌島リゾート殺人事件, Utajima Rizōto Satsujin Jiken): 1. Hajime Kindaichi, 37 Years Old (金田一一、37歳, Kindaichi Hajime, Sanjunana-sai); 2. Uta Island, Once Again (歌島、再び, Utajima, Futatabi); 3. The Curtain Rises on Tragedy (惨劇の幕開け, Sangeki no Makuake); 4. The Storm is Coming (嵐、来たる。, Arashi, Kitaru.); 5. Sheep in the Pen (檻の中の羊達。, Ori no Naka no Hitsuji-tachi.); 6. Ironclad Alibi (鉄壁のアリバイ, Teppeki no Aribai); 7. The Phantom Returns (再びのファントム, Futatabi no Fantomu); 8. On-site Investigation (現場検証, Gena Kenshō)
2	Kindaichi Age 37 Case Files 2 Kindaichi Sanjūnana-sai no Jikenbo Ni (金田一37歳の事件簿 (2))	October 28, 2018	978-4-06-513363-7
File 1: Uta Island Resort Murder Case (歌島リゾート殺人事件, Utajima Rizōto Satsujin Jiken): 9. Finally (ついに, Tsuini); 10. Direct Confrontation (直接対決, Chokusetsu Taiketsu); 11. The Fourth Phantom (第四のファントム, Daishi no Fantomu); 12. Resolution (決着, Ketchaku); 13. Uta Island After the Storm (嵐の後の歌島, Arashi no Nochi no Utajima); 14. Encounter (邂逅, Kaigō); 15. Endless Parallel Lines (終わらない平行線, Owaranai Heikōsen); File 2: Tower Mansion Madam Murder Case (タワマンマダム殺人事件, Tawaman Madamu Satsujin Jiken): 1. High-Rise Condominium Tower (タワーマンション, Tawāmanshon)
3	Kindaichi Age 37 Case Files 3 Kindaichi Sanjūnana-sai no Jikenbo San (金田一37歳の事件簿 (3))	February 22, 2019	978-4-06-514734-4
File 2: Tower Mansion Madam Murder Case (タワマンマダム殺人事件, Tawaman Madamu Satsujin Jiken): 2. A Spectacular Murder Case? (華麗なる殺人事件？, Kareinaru Satsujin Jiken?); 3. Suicide by Jumping (飛び降り自殺, Tobiorijisatsu); 4. Traces of "Suicide" (“自殺”の痕跡, "Jisatsu no Konseki); 5. Irrefutable Evidence? (動かぬ証拠？, Ugokanu Shōko?); 6. Goodbye, Prince (さよなら王子様, Sayonara Ōjisama); 7. The Great Detective's Grandchild (名探偵の孫, Mei Tantei no Mago); 8. Cleanup (後始末, Atoshimatsu); 9. From the Beginning (最初から, Saisho Kara)
4	Kindaichi Age 37 Case Files 4 Kindaichi Sanjūnana-sai no Jikenbo Yon (金田一37歳の事件簿 (4))	June 21, 2019	978-4-06-516176-0
File 2: Tower Mansion Madam Murder Case (タワマンマダム殺人事件, Tawaman Madamu Satsujin Jiken): 10. The Dark Side of Tower Mansion (タワマンの闇, Tawaman no Yami); File 3: Kyoto Beauty Florist Murder Case (京都美人華道家殺人事件, Kyōto Bijin Kadōka Satsujin Jiken): 1. Kyoto Beauty Florist Murder Case (京都美人華道家殺人事件, Kyōto Bijin Kadōka Satsujin Jiken); 2. The Dignity of the Head Family (宗家の品格, Sōke no Hinkaku); 3. A Murder Without Footprints (足跡なき殺人, Ashiato Naki Satsujin); 4. Footprints (足跡, Ashiato); 5. The Second Incident (第二の事件, Daini no Jiken); 6. Twin Sisters (双子の姉妹, Futago no Shimai); 7. The Internal Affairs of the Kyogoku Family (京極家の内情, Kyōgoku-ka no Naijō)
5	Kindaichi Age 37 Case Files 5 Kindaichi Sanjūnana-sai no Jikenbo Go (金田一37歳の事件簿 (5))	October 23, 2019	978-4-06-517334-3
File 3: Kyoto Beauty Florist Murder Case (京都美人華道家殺人事件, Kyōto Bijin Kadōka Satsujin Jiken): 8. An Endless Tragedy (終わらない惨劇, Owaranai Sangeki); 9. A Forged Suicide Note (偽りの遺書, Itsuwari no Isho); 10. Three Tips (3つのヒント, San-tsu no Hinto); 11. Invisible Stepping Stones (見えない飛石, Mienai Tobiishi); 12. Where the "Head" Is (“首”の在処, "Kubi" no Arika); 13. The Real Sakurako (本当の桜子, Hontō no Sakurako); 14. Bidding Farewell to the Capital of Kyoto (京の都に別れを告げて, Kyōto Nomiyako ni Wakare o Tsugete); File 4: Hakodate Western-style Hotel, The New Murder (函館異人館ホテル・新たなる殺人, Hakodate Ijinkan Hoteru Aratanaru Satsujin): 1. Western-style Hotel, Once Again (異人館ホテル、再び, Ijinkan Hoteru, Futatabi)
6	Kindaichi Age 37 Case Files 6 Kindaichi Sanjūnana-sai no Jikenbo Roku (金田一37歳の事件簿 (6))	March 23, 2020	978-4-06-518575-9
File 4: 2. Hakodate Western-style Hotel, The New Murder Chapter 2 (函館異人館ホテル・新たなる殺人 第2話, Hakodate Ijinkan Hoteru Aratanaru Satsujin Dai Ni Wa); 3. Hakodate Western-style Hotel, The New Murder Chapter 3 (函館異人館ホテル・新たなる殺人 第3話, Hakodate Ijinkan Hoteru Aratanaru Satsujin Dai San Wa); 4. Hakodate Western-style Hotel, The New Murder Chapter 4 (函館異人館ホテル・新たなる殺人 第4話, Hakodate Ijinkan Hoteru Aratanaru Satsujin Dai Yon Wa); 5. Hakodate Western-style Hotel, The New Murder Chapter 5 (函館異人館ホテル・新たなる殺人 第5話, Hakodate Ijinkan Hoteru Aratanaru Satsujin Dai Go Wa); 6. Hakodate Western-style Hotel, The New Murder Chapter 6 (函館異人館ホテル・新たなる殺人 第6話, Hakodate Ijinkan Hoteru Aratanaru Satsujin Dai Roku Wa); 7. Hakodate Western-style Hotel, The New Murder Chapter 7 (函館異人館ホテル・新たなる殺人 第7話, Hakodate Ijinkan Hoteru Aratanaru Satsujin Dai Nana Wa); 8. Hakodate Western-style Hotel, The New Murder Chapter 8 (函館異人館ホテル・新たなる殺人 第8話, Hakodate Ijinkan Hoteru Aratanaru Satsujin Dai Hachi Wa); 9. Hakodate Western-style Hotel, The New Murder Chapter 9 (函館異人館ホテル・新たなる殺人 第9話, Hakodate Ijinkan Hoteru Aratanaru Satsujin Dai Kyū Wa)
7	Kindaichi Age 37 Case Files 7 Kindaichi Sanjūnana-sai no Jikenbo Nana (金田一37歳の事件簿 (7))	June 23, 2020	978-4-06-519906-0
File 4: 10. Hakodate Western-style Hotel, The New Murder Chapter 10 (函館異人館ホテル・新たなる殺人 第10話, Hakodate Ijinkan Hoteru Aratanaru Satsujin Dai Jū Wa); 11. Hakodate Western-style Hotel, The New Murder Chapter 11 (函館異人館ホテル・新たなる殺人 第11話, Hakodate Ijinkan Hoteru Aratanaru Satsujin Dai Jūichi Wa); 12. Hakodate Western-style Hotel, The New Murder Chapter 12 (函館異人館ホテル・新たなる殺人 第12話, Hakodate Ijinkan Hoteru Aratanaru Satsujin Dai Jūni Wa); 13. Hakodate Western-style Hotel, The New Murder Chapter 13 (函館異人館ホテル・新たなる殺人 第13話, Hakodate Ijinkan Hoteru Aratanaru Satsujin Dai Jūsan Wa); 14. Hakodate Western-style Hotel, The New Murder Final Chapter (函館異人館ホテル・新たなる殺人 最終話, Hakodate Ijinkan Hoteru Aratanaru Satsujin Dai Saishū Wa); File 5: 1. Poltergeist Mansion Murder Case Chapter 1 (騒霊館殺人事件 第1話, Sōreikan Satsujin Jiken Dai Ichi Wa); 2. Poltergeist Mansion Murder Case Chapter 2 (騒霊館殺人事件 第2話, Sōreikan Satsujin Jiken Dai Ni Wa)
8	Kindaichi Age 37 Case Files 8 Kindaichi Sanjūnana-sai no Jikenbo Hachi (金田一37歳の事件簿 (8))	October 23, 2020	978-4-06-520851-9
File 5: 3. Poltergeist Mansion Murder Case Chapter 3 (騒霊館殺人事件 第3話, Sōreikan Satsujin Jiken Dai San Wa); 4. Poltergeist Mansion Murder Case Chapter 4 (騒霊館殺人事件 第4話, Sōreikan Satsujin Jiken Dai Yon Wa); 5. Poltergeist Mansion Murder Case Chapter 5 (騒霊館殺人事件 第5話, Sōreikan Satsujin Jiken Dai Go Wa); 6. Poltergeist Mansion Murder Case Chapter 6 (騒霊館殺人事件 第6話, Sōreikan Satsujin Jiken Dai Roku Wa); 7. Poltergeist Mansion Murder Case Chapter 7 (騒霊館殺人事件 第7話, Sōreikan Satsujin Jiken Dai Nana Wa); 8. Poltergeist Mansion Murder Case Chapter 8 (騒霊館殺人事件 第8話, Sōreikan Satsujin Jiken Dai Hachi Wa); 9. Poltergeist Mansion Murder Case Chapter 9 (騒霊館殺人事件 第9話, Sōreikan Satsujin Jiken Dai Kyū Wa)
9	Kindaichi Age 37 Case Files 9 Kindaichi Sanjūnana-sai no Jikenbo Kyū (金田一37歳の事件簿 (9))	April 23, 2021	978-4-06-522598-1
File 5: 10. Poltergeist Mansion Murder Case Chapter 10 (騒霊館殺人事件 第10話, Sōreikan Satsujin Jiken Dai Jū Wa); 11. Poltergeist Mansion Murder Case Chapter 11 (騒霊館殺人事件 第11話, Sōreikan Satsujin Jiken Dai Jūichi Wa); 12. Poltergeist Mansion Murder Case Chapter 12 (騒霊館殺人事件 第12話, Sōreikan Satsujin Jiken Dai Jūni Wa); 13. Poltergeist Mansion Murder Case Final Chapter (騒霊館殺人事件 最終話, Sōreikan Satsujin Jiken Dai Saishū Wa); File 6: 1. Ayase Serial Murder Case Chapter 1 (綾瀬連続殺人事件 第1話, Ayase Renzoku Satsujin Jiken Dai Ichi Wa); 2. Ayase Serial Murder Case Chapter 2 (綾瀬連続殺人事件 第2話, Ayase Renzoku Satsujin Jiken Dai Ni Wa); 3. Ayase Serial Murder Case Chapter 3 (綾瀬連続殺人事件 第3話, Ayase Renzoku Satsujin Jiken Dai San Wa)
10	Kindaichi Age 37 Case Files 10; Kindaichi Sanjūnana-sai no Jikenbo Jū (金田一37歳の事件簿 (10))	June 23, 2021	978-4-06-524043-4
File 6: 4. Ayase Serial Murder Case Chapter 4 (綾瀬連続殺人事件 第4話, Ayase Renzoku Satsujin Jiken Dai Yon Wa); 5. Ayase Serial Murder Case Chapter 5 (綾瀬連続殺人事件 第5話, Ayase Renzoku Satsujin Jiken Dai Go Wa); 6. Ayase Serial Murder Case Chapter 6 (綾瀬連続殺人事件 第6話, Ayase Renzoku Satsujin Jiken Dai Roku Wa); 7. Ayase Serial Murder Case Chapter 7 (綾瀬連続殺人事件 第7話, Ayase Renzoku Satsujin Jiken Dai Nana Wa); 8. Ayase Serial Murder Case Chapter 8 (綾瀬連続殺人事件 第8話, Ayase Renzoku Satsujin Jiken Dai Hachi Wa); 9. Ayase Serial Murder Case Chapter 9 (綾瀬連続殺人事件 第9話, Ayase Renzoku Satsujin Jiken Dai Kyū Wa); 10. Ayase Serial Murder Case Chapter 10 (綾瀬連続殺人事件 第10話, Ayase Renzoku Satsujin Jiken Dai Jū Wa)
11	Kindaichi Age 37 Case Files 11; Kindaichi Sanjūnana-sai no Jikenbo Jūichi (金田一37歳の事件簿 (11))	October 21, 2021	978-4-06-525068-6
File 6: 11. Ayase Serial Murder Case Chapter 11 (綾瀬連続殺人事件 第11話, Ayase Renzoku Satsujin Jiken Dai Jūichi Wa); 12. Ayase Serial Murder Case Chapter 12 (綾瀬連続殺人事件 第12話, Ayase Renzoku Satsujin Jiken Dai Jūni Wa); 13. Ayase Serial Murder Case Chapter 13 (綾瀬連続殺人事件 第13話, Ayase Renzoku Satsujin Jiken Dai Jūsan Wa); 14. Ayase Serial Murder Case Chapter 14 (綾瀬連続殺人事件 第14話, Ayase Renzoku Satsujin Jiken Dai Jūyon Wa); 15. Ayase Serial Murder Case Chapter 15 (綾瀬連続殺人事件 第15話, Ayase Renzoku Satsujin Jiken Dai Jūgo Wa); 16. Ayase Serial Murder Case Final Chapter (綾瀬連続殺人事件 最終話, Ayase Renzoku Satsujin Jiken Dai Saishū Wa); File 7: 1. Murderer With Twenty Faces Chapter 1 (殺人二十面相 第1話, Satsujin Nijūmensō Dai Ichi Wa)
12	Kindaichi Age 37 Case Files 12; Kindaichi Sanjūnana-sai no Jikenbo Jūni (金田一37歳の事件簿 (12))	April 21, 2022	978-4-06-528094-2
File 7: 2. Murderer With Twenty Faces Chapter 2 (殺人二十面相 第2話, Satsujin Nijūmensō Dai Ni Wa); 3. Murderer With Twenty Faces Chapter 3 (殺人二十面相 第3話, Satsujin Nijūmensō Dai San Wa); 4. Murderer With Twenty Faces Chapter 4 (殺人二十面相 第4話, Satsujin Nijūmensō Dai Yon Wa); 5. Murderer With Twenty Faces Chapter 5 (殺人二十面相 第5話, Satsujin Nijūmensō Dai Go Wa); 6. Murderer With Twenty Faces Chapter 6 (殺人二十面相 第6話, Satsujin Nijūmensō Dai Roku Wa); 7. Murderer With Twenty Faces Chapter 7 (殺人二十面相 第7話, Satsujin Nijūmensō Dai Nana Wa); 8. Murderer With Twenty Faces Chapter 8 (殺人二十面相 第8話, Satsujin Nijūmensō Dai Hachi Wa)
13	Kindaichi Age 37 Case Files 13; Kindaichi Sanjūnana-sai no Jikenbo Jūsan (金田一37歳の事件簿 (13))	June 22, 2022	978-4-06-528094-2
File 7: 9. Murderer With Twenty Faces Chapter 9 (殺人二十面相 第9話, Satsujin Nijūmensō Dai Kyū Wa); 10. Murderer With Twenty Faces Chapter 10 (殺人二十面相 第10話, Satsujin Nijūmensō Dai Jū Wa); 11. Murderer With Twenty Faces Chapter 11 (殺人二十面相 第11話, Satsujin Nijūmensō Dai Jūichi Wa); 12. Murderer With Twenty Faces Chapter 12 (殺人二十面相 第12話, Satsujin Nijūmensō Dai Jūni Wa); 13. Murderer With Twenty Faces Chapter 13 (殺人二十面相 第13話, Satsujin Nijūmensō Dai Jūsan Wa); 14. Murderer With Twenty Faces Final Chapter (殺人二十面相 第終話, Satsujin Nijūmensō Dai Saishū Wa)
14	Kindaichi Age 37 Case Files 14; Kindaichi Sanjūnana-sai no Jikenbo Jūyon (金田一37歳の事件簿 (14))	September 22, 2023	978-4-06-532836-1
File 8: 1. Werewolf Game Murder Case Chapter 1 (人狼ゲーム殺人事件 第1話, Jinrō Gēmu Satsujin Jiken Dai Ichi Wa); 2. Werewolf Game Murder Case Chapter 2 (人狼ゲーム殺人事件 第2話, Jinrō Gēmu Satsujin Jiken Dai Ni Wa); 3. Werewolf Game Murder Case Chapter 3 (人狼ゲーム殺人事件 第3話, Jinrō Gēmu Satsujin Jiken Dai San Wa); 4. Werewolf Game Murder Case Chapter 4 (人狼ゲーム殺人事件 第4話, Jinrō Gēmu Satsujin Jiken Dai Yon Wa); 5. Werewolf Game Murder Case Chapter 5 (人狼ゲーム殺人事件 第5話, Jinrō Gēmu Satsujin Jiken Dai Go Wa); 6. Werewolf Game Murder Case Chapter 6 (人狼ゲーム殺人事件 第6話, Jinrō Gēmu Satsujin Jiken Dai Roku Wa); 7. Werewolf Game Murder Case Chapter 7 (人狼ゲーム殺人事件 第7話, Jinrō Gēmu Satsujin Jiken Dai Nana Wa)
15	Kindaichi Age 37 Case Files 15; Kindaichi Sanjūnana-sai no Jikenbo Jūgo (金田一37歳の事件簿 (15))	January 23, 2024	978-4-06-534295-4
File 8: 8. Werewolf Game Murder Case Chapter 8 (人狼ゲーム殺人事件 第8話, Jinrō Gēmu Satsujin Jiken Dai Hachi Wa); 9. Werewolf Game Murder Case Chapter 9 (人狼ゲーム殺人事件 第9話, Jinrō Gēmu Satsujin Jiken Dai Kyū Wa); 10. Werewolf Game Murder Case Chapter 10 (人狼ゲーム殺人事件 第10話, Jinrō Gēmu Satsujin Jiken Dai Jū Wa); 11. Werewolf Game Murder Case Chapter 11 (人狼ゲーム殺人事件 第11話, Jinrō Gēmu Satsujin Jiken Dai Jūichi Wa); 12. Werewolf Game Murder Case Chapter 12 (人狼ゲーム殺人事件 第12話, Jinrō Gēmu Satsujin Jiken Dai Jūni Wa); 13. Werewolf Game Murder Case Chapter 13 (人狼ゲーム殺人事件 第13話, Jinrō Gēmu Satsujin Jiken Dai Jūsan Wa); 14. Werewolf Game Murder Case Chapter 14 (人狼ゲーム殺人事件 第14話, Jinrō Gēmu Satsujin Jiken Dai Jūyon Wa)
16	Kindaichi Age 37 Case Files 16; Kindaichi Sanjūnana-sai no Jikenbo Jūroku (金田一37歳の事件簿 (16))	June 21, 2024	978-4-06-535843-6
File 8: 15. Werewolf Game Murder Case Final Chapter (人狼ゲーム殺人事件 第終話, Jinrō Gēmu Satsujin Jiken Dai Saishū Wa); File 9: 1. Headless Skier Murder Case Chapter 1 (首なしスキーヤー人事件 第1話, Kubinashi Sukīyā Satsujin Jiken Dai Ichi Wa); 2. Headless Skier Murder Case Chapter 2 (首なしスキーヤー人事件 第2話, Kubinashi Sukīyā Satsujin Jiken Dai Ni Wa); 3. Headless Skier Murder Case Chapter 3 (首なしスキーヤー人事件 第3話, Kubinashi Sukīyā Satsujin Jiken Dai San Wa); 4. Headless Skier Murder Case Chapter 4 (首なしスキーヤー人事件 第4話, Kubinashi Sukīyā Satsujin Jiken Dai Yon Wa); 5. Headless Skier Murder Case Chapter 5 (首なしスキーヤー人事件 第5話, Kubinashi Sukīyā Satsujin Jiken Dai Go Wa); 6. Headless Skier Murder Case Chapter 6 (首なしスキーヤー人事件 第6話, Kubinashi Sukīyā Satsujin Jiken Dai Roku Wa)
17	Kindaichi Age 37 Case Files 17; Kindaichi Sanjūnana-sai no Jikenbo Jūnana (金田一37歳の事件簿 (17))	October 22, 2024	978-4-06-537029-2
File 9: 7. Headless Skier Murder Case Chapter 7 (首なしスキーヤー人事件 第7話, Kubinashi Sukīyā Satsujin Jiken Dai Nana Wa); 8. Headless Skier Murder Case Chapter 8 (首なしスキーヤー人事件 第8話, Kubinashi Sukīyā Satsujin Jiken Dai Hachi Wa); 9. Headless Skier Murder Case Chapter 9 (首なしスキーヤー人事件 第9話, Kubinashi Sukīyā Satsujin Jiken Dai Kyū Wa); 10. Headless Skier Murder Case Chapter 10 (首なしスキーヤー人事件 第10話, Kubinashi Sukīyā Satsujin Jiken Dai Jū Wa); 11. Headless Skier Murder Case Chapter 11 (首なしスキーヤー人事件 第11話, Kubinashi Sukīyā Satsujin Jiken Dai Jūichi Wa); 12. Headless Skier Murder Case Chapter 12 (首なしスキーヤー人事件 第12話, Kubinashi Sukīyā Satsujin Jiken Dai Jūni Wa); 13. Headless Skier Murder Case Final Chapter (首なしスキーヤー人事件 第終話, Kubinashi Sukīyā Satsujin Jiken Dai Saishū Wa)
18	Kindaichi Age 37 Case Files 18; Kindaichi Sanjūnana-sai no Jikenbo Jūhachi (金田一37歳の事件簿 (18))	January 22, 2025	978-4-06-537698-0
File 10: 1. Open-Air Closed Room Murder Case Chapter 1 (天空の密室殺人事件 第1話, Tenkū no Misshitsu Satsujin Jiken Dai Ichi Wa); 2. Open-Air Closed Room Murder Case Chapter 2 (天空の密室殺人事件 第2話, Tenkū no Misshitsu Satsujin Jiken Dai Ni Wa); 3. Open-Air Closed Room Murder Case Chapter 3 (天空の密室殺人事件 第3話, Tenkū no Misshitsu Satsujin Jiken Dai San Wa); 4. Open-Air Closed Room Murder Case Chapter 4 (天空の密室殺人事件 第4話, Tenkū no Misshitsu Satsujin Jiken Dai Yon Wa); 5. Open-Air Closed Room Murder Case Chapter 5 (天空の密室殺人事件 第5話, Tenkū no Misshitsu Satsujin Jiken Dai Go Wa); 6. Open-Air Closed Room Murder Case Chapter 6 (天空の密室殺人事件 第6話, Tenkū no Misshitsu Satsujin Jiken Dai Roku Wa); 7. Open-Air Closed Room Murder Case Chapter 7 (天空の密室殺人事件 第7話, Tenkū no Misshitsu Satsujin Jiken Dai Nana Wa); 8. Open-Air Closed Room Murder Case Final Chapter (天空の密室殺人事件 第終話, Tenkū no Misshitsu Satsujin Jiken Dai Saishū Wa)

=== 30th Anniversary series ===
No.	Title	Japanese release date	Japanese ISBN
1	Kindaichi Case Files 30th 1 Kindaichi Shōnen no Jikenbo Sātīsu Ichi (金田一少年の事件簿30th (1))	May 23, 2022	978-4-06-527859-8
File 48: 1. Yatagarasu Village Murder Case 1 (八咫烏村殺人事件1, Yatagarasu Mura Satsujin Jiken Ichi); 2. Yatagarasu Village Murder Case 2 (八咫烏村殺人事件2, Yatagarasu Mura Satsujin Jiken Ni); 3. Yatagarasu Village Murder Case 3 (八咫烏村殺人事件3, Yatagarasu Mura Satsujin Jiken San); 4. Yatagarasu Village Murder Case 4 (八咫烏村殺人事件4, Yatagarasu Mura Satsujin Jiken Yon); 5. Yatagarasu Village Murder Case 5 (八咫烏村殺人事件5, Yatagarasu Mura Satsujin Jiken Go); 6. Yatagarasu Village Murder Case 6 (八咫烏村殺人事件6, Yatagarasu Mura Satsujin Jiken Roku); 7. Yatagarasu Village Murder Case 7 (八咫烏村殺人事件7, Yatagarasu Mura Satsujin Jiken Nana)
2	Kindaichi Case Files 30th 2 Kindaichi Shōnen no Jikenbo Sātīsu Ni (金田一少年の事件簿30th (2))	October 21, 2022	978-4-06-529916-6
File 48: 8. Yatagarasu Village Murder Case 8 (八咫烏村殺人事件8, Yatagarasu Mura Satsujin Jiken Hachi); 9. Yatagarasu Village Murder Case 9 (八咫烏村殺人事件9, Yatagarasu Mura Satsujin Jiken Kyū); 10. Yatagarasu Village Murder Case 10 (八咫烏村殺人事件10, Yatagarasu Mura Satsujin Jiken Jū); 11. Yatagarasu Village Murder Case 11 (八咫烏村殺人事件11, Yatagarasu Mura Satsujin Jiken Jūichi); 12. Yatagarasu Village Murder Case 12 (八咫烏村殺人事件12, Yatagarasu Mura Satsujin Jiken Jūni); 13. Yatagarasu Village Murder Case 13 (八咫烏村殺人事件13, Yatagarasu Mura Satsujin Jiken Jūsan); 14. Yatagarasu Village Murder Case Final (八咫烏村殺人事件終, Yatagarasu Mura Satsujin Jiken Saishū)
3	Kindaichi Case Files 30th 3 Kindaichi Shōnen no Jikenbo Sātīsu San (金田一少年の事件簿30th (3))	January 23, 2023	978-4-06-530478-5
File 49: 1. Oninohe's Grave Lion Legend Murder Case 1 (鬼戸・墓獅子伝説殺人事件1, Oninohe Hakajishi Densetsu Satsujin Jiken Ichi); 2. Oninohe's Grave Lion Legend Murder Case 2 (鬼戸・墓獅子伝説殺人事件2, Oninohe Hakajishi Densetsu Satsujin Jiken Ni); 3. Oninohe's Grave Lion Legend Murder Case 3 (鬼戸・墓獅子伝説殺人事件3, Oninohe Hakajishi Densetsu Satsujin Jiken San); 4. Oninohe's Grave Lion Legend Murder Case 4 (鬼戸・墓獅子伝説殺人事件4, Oninohe Hakajishi Densetsu Satsujin Jiken Yon); 5. Oninohe's Grave Lion Legend Murder Case 5 (鬼戸・墓獅子伝説殺人事件5, Oninohe Hakajishi Densetsu Satsujin Jiken Go); 6. Oninohe's Grave Lion Legend Murder Case 6 (鬼戸・墓獅子伝説殺人事件6, Oninohe Hakajishi Densetsu Satsujin Jiken Roku); 7. Oninohe's Grave Lion Legend Murder Case 7 (鬼戸・墓獅子伝説殺人事件7, Oninohe Hakajishi Densetsu Satsujin Jiken Nana)
4	Kindaichi Case Files 30th 4 Kindaichi Shōnen no Jikenbo Sātīsu Yon (金田一少年の事件簿30th (4))	April 21, 2023	978-4-06-531473-9
File 49: 8. Oninohe's Grave Lion Legend Murder Case 8 (鬼戸・墓獅子伝説殺人事件8, Oninohe Hakajishi Densetsu Satsujin Jiken Hachi); 9. Oninohe's Grave Lion Legend Murder Case 9 (鬼戸・墓獅子伝説殺人事件9, Oninohe Hakajishi Densetsu Satsujin Jiken Kyū); 10. Oninohe's Grave Lion Legend Murder Case 10 (鬼戸・墓獅子伝説殺人事件10, Oninohe Hakajishi Densetsu Satsujin Jiken Jū); 11. Oninohe's Grave Lion Legend Murder Case 11 (鬼戸・墓獅子伝説殺人事件11, Oninohe Hakajishi Densetsu Satsujin Jiken Jūichi); 12. Oninohe's Grave Lion Legend Murder Case Final (鬼戸・墓獅子伝説殺人事件終, Oninohe Hakajishi Densetsu Satsujin Jiken Saishū); Greetings from the Gentleman Thief: 1. Greetings from the Gentleman Thief Part One (怪盗紳士の挨拶 前編, Kaitō Shinshi no Aisatsu Kyaku Zenpen); 2. Greetings from the Gentleman Thief Part Two (怪盗紳士の挨拶 後編, Kaitō Shinshi no Aisatsu Kyaku Kōhen)

=== Papa series ===
No.	Title	Japanese release date	Japanese ISBN
1	Kindaichi Papa Case Files 1 Kindaichi Papa no Jikenbo Ichi (金田一パパの事件簿 (1))	June 11, 2025	—
File 1: 1. Private Detective Murder Case Chapter 1 (私立探偵殺人事件 第1話, Shiritsu Tantei Satsujin Jiken Dai Ichi Wa); 2. Private Detective Murder Case Chapter 2 (私立探偵殺人事件 第2話, Shiritsu Tantei Satsujin Jiken Dai Ni Wa); 3. Private Detective Murder Case Chapter 3 (私立探偵殺人事件 第3話, Shiritsu Tantei Satsujin Jiken Dai San Wa); 4. Private Detective Murder Case Chapter 4 (私立探偵殺人事件 第4話, Shiritsu Tantei Satsujin Jiken Dai Yon Wa); 5. Private Detective Murder Case Chapter 5 (私立探偵殺人事件 第5話, Shiritsu Tantei Satsujin Jiken Dai Go Wa); 6. Private Detective Murder Case Chapter 6 (私立探偵殺人事件 第6話, Shiritsu Tantei Satsujin Jiken Dai Roku Wa)
2	Kindaichi Papa Case Files 2 Kindaichi Papa no Jikenbo Ni (金田一パパの事件簿 (2))	October 8, 2025	—
File 1: 7. Private Detective Murder Case Chapter 7 (私立探偵殺人事件 第7話, Shiritsu Tantei Satsujin Jiken Dai Nana Wa); 8. Private Detective Murder Case Chapter 8 (私立探偵殺人事件 第8話, Shiritsu Tantei Satsujin Jiken Dai Hachi Wa); 9. Private Detective Murder Case Chapter 9 (私立探偵殺人事件 第9話, Shiritsu Tantei Satsujin Jiken Dai Kyū Wa); 10. Private Detective Murder Case Chapter 10 (私立探偵殺人事件 第10話, Shiritsu Tantei Satsujin Jiken Dai Jū Wa); 11. Private Detective Murder Case Chapter 11 (私立探偵殺人事件 第11話, Shiritsu Tantei Satsujin Jiken Dai Jūichi Wa); 12. Private Detective Murder Case Final Chapter (私立探偵殺人事件 第終話, Shiritsu Tantei Satsujin Jiken Dai Saishū Wa)
3	Kindaichi Papa Case Files 3 Kindaichi Papa no Jikenbo San (金田一パパの事件簿 (3))	February 10, 2026	—
File 2: 1. Revenge of the Mummy Diva Chapter 1 (復讐のミイラ歌姫 第1話, Fukushū no Mīra Utahime Dai Ichi Wa); 2. Revenge of the Mummy Diva Chapter 2 (復讐のミイラ歌姫 第2話, Fukushū no Mīra Utahime Dai Ni Wa); 3. Revenge of the Mummy Diva Chapter 3 (復讐のミイラ歌姫 第3話, Fukushū no Mīra Utahime Dai San Wa); 4. Revenge of the Mummy Diva Chapter 4 (復讐のミイラ歌姫 第4話, Fukushū no Mīra Utahime Dai Yon Wa); 5. Revenge of the Mummy Diva Chapter 5 (復讐のミイラ歌姫 第5話, Fukushū no Mīra Utahime Dai Go Wa); 6. Revenge of the Mummy Diva Chapter 6 (復讐のミイラ歌姫 第6話, Fukushū no Mīra Utahime Dai Roku Wa)
4	Kindaichi Papa Case Files 4 Kindaichi Papa no Jikenbo Yon (金田一パパの事件簿 (4))	June 10, 2026	—
File 2: 7. Revenge of the Mummy Diva Chapter 7 (復讐のミイラ歌姫 第7話, Fukushū no Mīra Utahime Dai Nana Wa); 8. Revenge of the Mummy Diva Chapter 8 (復讐のミイラ歌姫 第8話, Fukushū no Mīra Utahime Dai Hachi Wa); 9. Revenge of the Mummy Diva Chapter 9 (復讐のミイラ歌姫 第9話, Fukushū no Mīra Utahime Dai Kyū Wa); 10. Revenge of the Mummy Diva Chapter 10 (復讐のミイラ歌姫 第10話, Fukushū no Mīra Utahime Dai Jū Wa); 11. Revenge of the Mummy Diva Chapter 11 (復讐のミイラ歌姫 第11話, Fukushū no Mīra Utahime Dai Jūichi Wa); 12. Revenge of the Mummy Diva Chapter 12 (復讐のミイラ歌姫 第12話, Fukushū no Mīra Utahime Dai Jūni Wa); 13. Revenge of the Mummy Diva Final Chapter (復讐のミイラ歌姫 第終話, Fukushū no Mīra Utahime Dai Saishū Wa)
5	Kindaichi Papa Case Files 5 Kindaichi Papa no Jikenbo Go (金田一パパの事件簿 (5))	October 14, 2026	—
File 3: 1. Ace of Spades, Harbinger of Death Chapter 1 (死の使いスペードのA 第1話, Shinotsukai Supēdo no Ēsu Dai Ichi Wa); 2. Ace of Spades, Harbinger of Death Chapter 2 (死の使いスペードのA 第2話, Shinotsukai Supēdo no Ēsu Dai Ni Wa); 3. Ace of Spades, Harbinger of Death Chapter 3 (死の使いスペードのA 第3話, Shinotsukai Supēdo no Ēsu Dai San Wa); 4. Ace of Spades, Harbinger of Death Chapter 4 (死の使いスペードのA 第4話, Shinotsukai Supēdo no Ēsu Dai Yon Wa); 5. Ace of Spades, Harbinger of Death Chapter 5 (死の使いスペードのA 第5話, Shinotsukai Supēdo no Ēsu Dai Go Wa); 6. Ace of Spades, Harbinger of Death Chapter 6 (死の使いスペードのA 第6話, Shinotsukai Supēdo no Ēsu Dai Roku Wa); 7. Ace of Spades, Harbinger of Death Chapter 7 (死の使いスペードのA 第7話, Shinotsukai Supēdo no Ēsu Dai Nana Wa)

== Case summaries ==
=== File series ===
1. The Opera House Murders is the first Kindaichi mystery, and the story on which the first anime movie is based. Miyuki corrals Kindaichi into assisting the school drama club in rehearsing The Phantom of the Opera at an isolated island hotel. But a killer stalks the high school group, one who can walk across mud without leaving footprints, and it's up to Kindaichi to solve the case, fighting time, weather, and Police Inspector Kenmochi, who fails to take the young man seriously (for the last time).
2. The Mummy's Curse sees Kindaichi and Miyuki visit a classmate about to get married, accompanied by a teacher, who was a boyfriend of the bride. The small hexagram-shaped village in which the classmate lives is packed with wealthy aristocrats who keep mysterious, cut-up mummies in their luxurious homes. But things turn serious when a murder is committed in a locked chapel, and the aristocrats start dying one by one. For Kindaichi, this case is more than the mummies' curse. After finding a connection between the victims and the tragic accident involving the burned church 27 years ago, Kindaichi finally reveals the murderer and the village's dark past!
3. Death TV follows Kindaichi and Kenmochi as they assist in the production of Shock TV, a prank-pulling reality show. Fun turns to fright when one of the show's victims is slaughtered by someone dressed up as a legendary snow demon called the "Yukiyasha", while the crew (including pop star Reika Hayami) watches in horror via TV broadcast. The trouble is, how was the murder committed when all the suspects were a twenty-minute drive away from the crime scene?
4. Smoke and Mirrors hits Kindaichi's high school when he and Miyuki are asked to join the school's Mystery Club and attempt to track down a series of urban legends called "The Seven Mysteries of Fudo High." It seems the school has been receiving threatening letters from someone who calls himself "The Afterschool Magician" stating that his home in the old campus area must not be destroyed. But the school's legendary bogeyman turns out to be all too real, a shadowy figure who is able to make himself, and the corpse of one of Kindaichi's classmates, vanish in less than two minutes from a locked room. With Miyuki nearly killed, this case may be too much for Hajime Kindaichi...
5. Treasure Isle is rumored to hide a vast bounty of gold said to be guarded by the legendary beast "Yamawara", which Kindaichi and other treasure hunters gather to search for. But the host is killed before the group even arrives, and a bloody slaying takes place during a time in which none of the people on the island could have done it. Will the island's mythical monster-guardian claim more victims?
6. The Legend of Lake Hiren involves a legend about a pair of lovers who drowned themselves in a lake, but the lake itself now houses an exclusive resort whose shares could be worth millions. Kindaichi and Miyuki join a focus group evaluating the resort. But the group is soon stalked by an escaped killer who fashioned his slaying after those of Jason Voorhees, and wouldn't you know it, the only bridge to civilization has been cut off...
7. The Santa Slayings revolve around an exclusive hotel and one of its most unusual guests, a red-bearded man whose dress resembles that of Santa Claus. His very mythos is a shadow hanging over a prominent acting guild staying at the hotel, putting on a murder mystery weekend game. But the murders turn all too real, and Kindaichi becomes personally involved when one of his friends becomes a victim, and the only other person found in the locked room... is him!
8. No Noose is Good Noose, or so they say at an exclusive college prep school that Kindaichi is conned into attending by his mother. But the high-pressure school is known for driving its students to suicide by hanging. It's in this atmosphere that a teacher begs Kindaichi's help in finding a mysterious vandal who seems to be targeting her. But the vandal soon graduates to murder, and seems to have the ability to evaporate from locked rooms. Can Kindaichi make the grade?
9. The Headless Samurai is a legend in a small town, warning of betrayal and blood. A childhood friend of Kenmochi asks him for help when this myth comes to life and begins threatening her. Then a mysterious stranger is killed in a sealed room, and Kindaichi has to deal with headless corpses, greedy heirs, and an entire village too scared to talk.
10. Kindaichi the Killer!? (In the American series this book is found split into both books 10 and 11, changing the number order of the books following.) Kindaichi is invited by an old acquaintance to help his publishing editor acquire the rights to a new book by a famous writer. The eccentric, arrogant author throws a code breaking contest at his villa to determine the lucky recipient. Unfortunately, the writer is murdered, and it's impossible for anyone to have committed the crime except one person: Hajime Kindaichi! Soon Kindaichi is in a race against the police and the killer to break the code and clear his name.
11. Playing the Fool is something Kindaichi is loath to do, especially when it comes to women. Pop star Reika Hayami invites Kindaichi and Miyuki to the Tarot Lodge, high in the snowy mountains, which immediately sets off a rivalry between the two women. Joining them is a motley crew including Reika's manager, a lost skier, and an obsessed fan. But the weekend turns tragic when Reika's father's darkest secret threatens to reveal itself, and terrifying murders occur. Can Kindaichi protect Reika, and figure out how a killer slipped in and out of a room under constant observation?
12. The House of Wax is holding a murder mystery weekend, which Kindaichi and Miyuki are invited to by Superintendent Akechi. There they find numerous wax figures, including replicas of each participant. However, they soon find out that this is more than a mere game: the mysterious host, "Mr. Redrum", uses the wax figures to show a murder scene before actually killing the victim with the same method under seemingly impossible circumstances. Now Kindaichi must find the host that calls himself a murderer before the body count rises.
13. The Gentleman Thief is a famous thief who steals famous artworks, as well as their "themes", by destroying or mutilating the object featured in the artwork. However, it seems that this time he has gone too far, by killing the father of one of Kindaichi's friends. But solving this case will be difficult, since all the suspects apparently have perfect alibis...
14. Graveyard Isle is one of the remnants of the US's island hopping in World War II, where Japanese soldiers committed harakiri. Not exactly the place Kindaichi and his friends wanted to spend a week's vacation, especially with a group of college wargamers. But all too soon, they have violent death to deal with, including a murder that could only have been committed by a ghost...
15. The Magical Express is where the mystery starts, a train that runs between Tokyo and a remote town, featuring magic shows put on by a group of prominent magicians. Drawn there by a threat by the mysterious "Puppetmaster", Kindaichi, Miyuki, Kenmochi, and Ryuji Saki witness a corpse vanish from a locked cabin. The murders continue at an isolated hotel, and the detectives are faced with serious questions. Who is the "Puppetmaster"? And what's his relation to the late head of the magic troupe, Reiko Chikayama? Was Reiko's death really an accident?
16. The Undying Butterflies are no beautiful insects, but a harbinger of disease and death. Kindachi and Miyuki infiltrate the estate of a wealthy butterfly collector in pursuit of a killer from the past who should be dead. But then people start dying, pinned like butterflies, murdered when no one could possibly have done it. Has the resurrected killer started another bloody rampage? Or is there something more sinister afoot?
17. Burial Francs is a burial practice in a small French village, where a franc is buried with the dead. For one of Kindaichi's childhood schoolmates, however, it was an omen of death for her and her colleagues! Amidst trying to enjoy the bridal competition show and to protect the innocent lives from getting involved, will Kindaichi figure out this "Burial Francs" who is killing off people one by one? What's his connection to Kindaichi's friend?
18. The Devil's Artifacts is the nickname given to four artifacts that were said to be cursed – but Kindaichi, who was hired to dig them up, didn't believe in the old tale... until people started dying because of it. Now, with people's lives (and his salary!) at stake, Kindaichi must find out the identity of the artifacts' "guardian" and where they are hidden.
19. Reika's Kidnapping is exactly what it sounds like, the kidnapping of pop idol and Kindaichi's friend, Reika Hayami. After escaping from a villa, she claims that her kidnapper was a clown. Kindaichi soon deduces that the mystery clown has to be one of the crew working the movie Reika was appearing in. But which?

=== Short File series ===
1. Murderous Intent of Below Freezing 15 Degrees
2. Who Killed the Goddess?
3. Supt.Akechi's Case Files
4. The Twin Murderer
5. Christmas Eve Murder
6. Supt.Akechi's Case Files 2
7. The Murder in the Mirror Labyrinth
8. Fumi Kindaichi's Kidnapping
9. Young Akechi's Magnificent Case Files
10. The Adventure of Fumi Kindaichi
11. Lost Ransom
12. Alibi in the Film
13. The Homicide Restaurant
14. Homicide of the Blood Dyeing Pool
15. Departed Spirit School Murder Case
16. Puzzle of Instantaneous Disappearance
17. The Challenge from Mysterious Gentlemen Thief
18. Morning Sound of Gunshot at 4.40 am
19. The Bee Poison Sword Murder Case
20. The Strange Intrigue of the Female Doctor

=== Case series ===
1. Forest of Cerberus: Kindaichi and the group of friends visit the Forest of Cerberus to hunt mushrooms. Things start going wrong when their villa is burnt down, and they are forced to take refuge in an abandoned hospital with a group of medical students. Remnants of test animals, including a cage marked Cerberus, still remain there... Not to mention rabies-infested dogs stalking the halls, and a shadow that resembles the Cerberus of legend. Then the medical students begin dying one by one, their deaths accompanied by vicious claw marks! Is the ancient Greek guardian of the underworld the killer? Will it matter if Kindaichi can't get himself and his friends out alive?
2. The Murderer From Screen: The head of the movie club at Fudo High, grandson of Japan's king of cinema, offers Miyuki a starring role in his latest project. But when the other participants start dying, the crew notices a resemblance between their deaths and scenes from the club's previous film, Scorpion. The case seems solved when the director apparently kills himself, clutching the only keys to not one, but TWO locked doors separating him and the suspects. But Kindaichi isn't so sure the case is closed. Who is making life imitate art?
3. Divine Treasure of Kotousu is a long lost treasure belonged to Catholics in ancient Japan, guarded by a White Hair Ghost. Not caring much about the legend, Kindaichi – who desperately needed the money and by invitation – went to Kotousu to hunt for the treasure. However, the treasure hunters start dying, one during a time when all the hunters have rock-solid alibis! Will Kindaichi be able to find the murderer, and get some money for himself too?
4. Ghost of Yukikage Village: One of his childhood friends has died in the remote Yukikage village, so Kindaichi goes to pay his final respects. However, the death isn't all it appears to be, and soon more of Kindaichi's friends are dropping dead. Who is the killer, and what does the original death have to do with these new murders?
5. The Plot of Russian Dolls: Ryuji Saki asks Kindaichi, Miyuki, and Kenmochi to help him solve a puzzle that leads to the inheritance of a famous mystery writer. But the puzzle deepens when the heirs start losing their heads... literally! Usually, Kindaichi would have enough problems figuring out how the killer got into a locked room with the only key also locked away, but to make things worse, a figure from Kindaichi's past -— his nemesis, Takato -— returns with a bet: if Kindaichi finds the murderer first, he will let the killer face justice. Otherwise, Takato will allow the killer to continue his bloody work... then will execute him! Can Kindaichi protect both the future victims and the murderer?
6. Circus du Murder: Miyuki, Kindaichi, and his know-it-all cousin, Fumi, are invited by Kenmochi to join him and his wife Kazue at an inn located on a tropical island. There, they meet a circus troupe named the Goblin Circus, who live near the resort. When a storage room is found wrecked, along with mysterious gigantic footprints and a message on the wall that reads "MONSTER IS BACK", the troupe members are suspiciously quiet. However, some members have been secretly discussing a 2.3 m tall performer who disappeared a year ago, nicknamed "Monster". With the storm which prevents them from escaping the island and two clowns found dead, Kindaichi must find the culprit: is it really the "Monster", or someone else with an axe to grind?
7. Judgment of Gankutsuō: Looking over a traveler's brochure, Kindaichi discovers that his old nemesis is in Hong Kong, and up to no good. Indeed, Takato's latest scheme involves assisting a murderer who calls himself the Gankutsuō ("The Count of Monte Cristo"). Ultimately, Takato manages to frame Kindaichi for the murders, just to prove he is the smarter man! Now, Kindaichi must prove his innocence by finding Gankutsuō, and make his nemesis pay for his crimes, once and for all!

=== New series ===
1. Legendary Vampire Murders: A month after Kindaichi went on his bicycle riding vacation, he sends a letter to Miyuki, inviting her and Kenmochi to a themed inn named "Ruins", where one of their former classmates has a part-time job. The inn is located in a virtual ghost town due to rumors regarding vampirism that sprung up a few years past. The rumor comes to life when guests of the inn were found dead, their bodies drained of blood, with two puncture wounds on their necks—which appear to be vampire bites. Worse, the murders are impossible, unless the killer really is a vampire... or Miyuki Nanase...
2. The Third Opera House Murders: Kindaichi, Miyuki, and Kenmochi return to the island Opera House Hotel for the third time (the second was detailed in the first of a series of Kindaichi novels by Seimaru Amagi), this time after the death of the hotel's owner, Kurosawa. The hotel and island has been bought by an old friend of Kurosawa, who wishes to honor his memory with a final performance of The Phantom of the Opera, before tearing the place down for good. Along with Kindaichi and gang, the new owner has invited members of Kurosawa's old theater troupe. However, tragedy strikes again when murders occur before the performance can take place.
3. Gate of Jail Private School Murders: Back from his bicycle riding and applying for a top quality but extremely hellish school, Kindaichi once again encountered a murder on the day of his application exam... but Kindaichi kind of expected it. The exam site and the school itself were two of the locations on a "crime site tour" list compiled by his nemesis Takato – who, in his twisted mind, believed that these locations could be used to plan murder (thus Kindaichi's bike tour around Japan). To make it worse, Takato has recently escaped prison, and initiated his list of murder. Now, also sending the list to Akechi, Takato (disguised as an English teacher, unknown to them but revealed to readers) silently challenged them to figure out the common point among the murders and find his client... or is he planning something else for them? And lastly, is he going to make all the possible murder sites a reality?
4. Spirit of the Snow Kindaichi Hajime was offered to receive a portion of a rich man's wealth as it written in his will. Seduced by money, Hajime along with Miyuki to the top of snowy mountain where all of the recipient of old man's wealth gathered. As Hajime discover more about the legend of a snow spirit, the recipients of the wealth begin to die one by one.
5. Fudo High School Festival Kindaichi attended a "maid café" hosted by the school's photo club only to discover a mysterious death. This case lasts only for four chapters, making this the shortest Kindaichi case (besides from the short stories) thus far.
6. Chidamari's Murderer Kindaichi is forced to join "Go" club of his school.. by then, they go for a friendly match with a school. Then, one of the player has been killed at a place called "chidamari"- (the bottom of the Go board). Is it related to the legendary chidamari story? Kindaichi must find out who is the real culprit despite all the alibi they have. This short case has been published together with Fudo High School Festival Murder Case.
7. The Black Magic Kindaichi's old friend from Karuizawa telling the truth behind the death of a company director, due to the curse of the puppet by using 'black magic'. Therefore, there's a tragedy lies behind the series of the black magic murders and the mask of the 'Puppet from Hell', Youichi Takatoo. Is it really a black magic murders, or just an illusionist murder?
8. Murder Committed by Inspector Kenmochi Three delinquents who committed a murder a few years back were released from jail and attends the same school with Kindaichi. Due to Kenmochi's grudge towards them, the trio was targeted by an unknown killer, and Kenmochi became the suspect of the murders. Kindaichi knows that Kenmochi is not the killer and he must find out who the real killer is.
9. The Alchemy Kindaichi joins the television game show and leads a group of television crew (including Reika Hayami the pop singer) and the participants to a deserted island, where an extremely intelligent physicist died. Then, one by one, the television crew was knock down by a masked killer who hold a huge weapon. Reika became the prime suspect of the case. This arc featured the main characters from Detective Academy Q, along with Saburomaru as the minor character, appearing only for a few pages.
10. House of Games Kindaichi and Miyuki take a ride after the festival for free of charge after realizing that he had overspend his cash. Then, suddenly he fall asleep. When he wake up, he found out that he was wearing a death mask (similar to the Saw reverse bear trap) along with Miyuki and a few other people who ride the bus. He found out that he and people in the basement required to play a deadly game, in order to survive until the end.

=== 20th Anniversary series ===
1. Human Eater Research Institute Kindaichi and Miyuki were invited by their ex-classmate, teenage genius Midorigawa Mayu, to her deceased father's research institute, nicknamed the Man-eater Research Institute, to investigate the mystery behind a series of suicides of researchers. During their stay at the institute, visitors committed suicide one by one. However, Kindaichi believed that these incidents were in fact murder and promised to uncover the truth.
2. Treasure in Kowloon, Hong Kong Miyuki was discovered by a modelling agency to participate in a fashion show in Hong Kong. Upon arrival, Miyuki was kidnapped and Kindaichi met a Hong Kong model, Lan Yeung, who looks exactly the same as Miyuki. The kidnap of Miyuki and the series of murders of VIPs at the fashion show seemed to point to the truth behind a local legendary gang leader, Emperor Dragon, and his hidden treasure, the Dragon Eye, in Hong Kong.
3. Midnight Castle Kindaichi and Miyuki joined the Midnight Castle Tour to experience the life of blind people. In complete darkness, a murder happened.
4. Mansion of Rosenkreuz Kindaichi's nemesis, Takato, sought help from Kindaichi after he received an invitation (also a threat letter) from an unknown person, Mr. Rosenkreuz, to the Mansion of Rosenkreuz, a mansion shaped as a Christian Cross and surrounded by a sea of roses. Guests gathered at the mansion to celebrate the successful cultivation of "the perfect Blue Rose", only to be murdered one by one.

=== R (Returns) series ===
1. The Myth of the Snow Goblin A luxurious resort, Snow Goblin Skiing Resort, was looking for a new face for the brand. Miyuki was selected to be one of the potential girls, in replacement of her injured classmate. During Kindaichi and Miyuki's stay at the resort, one of the guests vanished without a trace. While people deemed it the attack of the mythical Snow Goblin, Kindaichi believed it was, in fact, murder.
2. The Haunted Academy Kindaichi and Miyuki set off to a deserted island, where 200 kg of gold was believed to be hidden in the ruins of an old school campus. They met Akechi and Kenmochi on the island, who were following traces of Takato. Meanwhile, three university students of the Ruins Investigation Club were murdered one by one. Was it the doing of Undead Headmaster, the wandering ghost of the haunted school, or was it another crime masterminded by Takato?
3. Fox-fire Murders Mystery Kindaichi reunited with 8 of his childhood friends at White Fox Village for the funeral of Tsukie Marie, who had recently been murdered and dressed as a fox spirit. As his friends were murdered one by one, Kindaichi vowed to discover the truth behind the murders.
4. College Student Akechi's Case Based on request of his old teacher in high school, Akechi agreed to investigate his senior Mikuni Rena who were troubled by something. In order to do that, he came to her college's festival where she became an announcer for her own campus radio. However, during the on-air broadcast someone was murdered and Akechi couldn't shake the feeling that his senior was involved, but how? This short series continues shortly after "Takato Case File", and this story shows the first meeting between Akechi and Kenmochi who was still Assistant Inspector at that time.
5. Antlion's Nest Kindaichi and Miyuki were invited to participate in a 3-day color psychology research on a research institute designed like ant's nest in a remote desert by their reporter friend, Mr. Itsuki Yousuke. The research itself was puzzling enough, when all the subjects were dressed in and placed in rooms of different colors. The mystery thickened when two of the subjects were stabbed to death in the institute – nicknamed "Antlion Trench".
6. Bloodthirsty Cherry Blossom Kindaichi and Miyuki went on a trip to Yozakura Village for their Mysteries Club activity with the help of Ryuji Saki. Local folklore said that a doctor dismembered his patients and hid body parts under a cherry blossom tree, of which the flowers were unordinarily crimson red, hence its name "Blood-drinking Cherry Blossom". Visitors from different parts of the country gathered to view this famous blossom. Unfortunately, for some of them this was their last trip as they were murdered by an unknown killer.
7. Why was the fireplace burning at that moment? Itsuki Yousuke was called by a lover of his passing friend to be a mediator in an inheritance dispute. Behind the dispute, a threat letter was sent, signifying that something may happen during the discussion so Itsuki decide to take Kindaichi and Miyuki. Then, one of the member was found dead inside a locked cabin. Is it suicide, or a murder in a locked room? Why was the fireplace burning even though the weather was not cold? A short series.
8. Island of the Dolls After solving the riddle on a mysterious letter upon the request of their social studies teacher, Ms. Shinobu Tokita, Kindaichi and Miyuki were invited to Hitogata Island, a.k.a. "The Island of the Dolls", to attend an annual ritual of doll worshiping. A popular group of masked novelists, namely the "Persona Dolls", were among the guests on the legendary island. The ghost of an ancient village chief was rumored to be haunting the place, but the true mystery was yet to be uncovered when the Persona Dolls were murdered and brutally dismembered one by one.
9. Akechi The Sommelier Among other talents he have, Akechi Kengo, chief superintendent of Tokyo Police headquarter is a capable sommelier! But when a murder happens in a wine meeting, will our Ace Superintendent be able to find the killer in the name of Dionysus, God of Grape and Wine? Short story.
10. Curse of Black Spirit Kindaichi was asked by Reika to help as a part-time worker in a film she stars at. He (and Miyuki who was obviously not jealous after accidentally saw the request) agreed to help. Unfortunately, the site, an old building of a hotel, was said to be haunted by a black shadow figure one of the crew saw not too log ago. To make things worse, the title of the film was "Black Spirit Hotel". The filming went just like scheduled up until one of the stars died from a falling chandelier. Semi-long story.
11. White Snake Brewing By Inspector Kenmochi's request, Kindaichi and Miyuki participated in Shirohebi Sake Brewing Tour owned by Shirakami family located in Hakuja Village, a village said to be blessed by White Snake God. The tour was meant to be an undercover investigation to look for a wanted serial murders who was hiding in the village. What awaited them there, however, was a series of murders in which the victims were wrapped in white froth shaped like white snake. Was it a curse or the fugitive's work?
12. Siren's Lament As they entered the final round of Open-Sea Fishing Tournament, Kindaichi, Kenmochi and Miyuki went to Seiren Island, an island famous for its fishing spot along with three other groups. Unfortunately for them, the tournament had to be cancelled since one participant died before the competition even began. While the rest of them were trapped in the island, more people fell victim to Siren which has been singing in sorrow for those sacrificing their lives in the island, which used to be a Kamikaze attack training grounds.
13. Fumi Kindaichi Kidnapping

=== Inspector Akechi Case Files ===
1. Young Boy's Retaliation
2. Figure of Justice
3. Adored Policeman
4. Teared Bonds
5. Cannot Across Rubicon River
6. Crooked Feeling
7. Strange Observer
8. Vagrant's Grief
9. Informer in a Fog
10. In the Name of Justice

=== Age 37 series ===
1. Uta Island Resort
2. Tower Mansion Madam
3. Kyoto Beauty Florist
4. Hakodate Western-style Hotel, The New Murder
5. Poltergeist Mansion
6. Ayase Serial Murder
7. Murderer With Twenty Faces
8. Werewolf Game
9. Headless Skier
10. Open-Air Closed Room

=== 30th Anniversary series ===
1. Yatagarasu Village
2. Oninohe's Grave Lion Legend

=== Papa series ===
1. Abandoned Kodama Ryokan Murders

== See also ==
- List of The Kindaichi Case Files light novels
