= Talented and Gifted =

Talented and Gifted or Gifted and Talented may refer to:

- Intellectual giftedness, an intellectual ability significantly higher than average
- National Association for Gifted Children, a UK organization
- Talented and Gifted program, any academic program for exceptional students
- School for the Talented & Gifted, a Dallas high school
- Gifted & Talented series, a popular book series for exceptional children and their parents

== See also ==
- Gifted (disambiguation)
- G&T (disambiguation)
- TNG (disambiguation)
- Tag (disambiguation)
