= Aledo Opera House =

Historic small-town opera house

- U.S. National Register of Historic Places
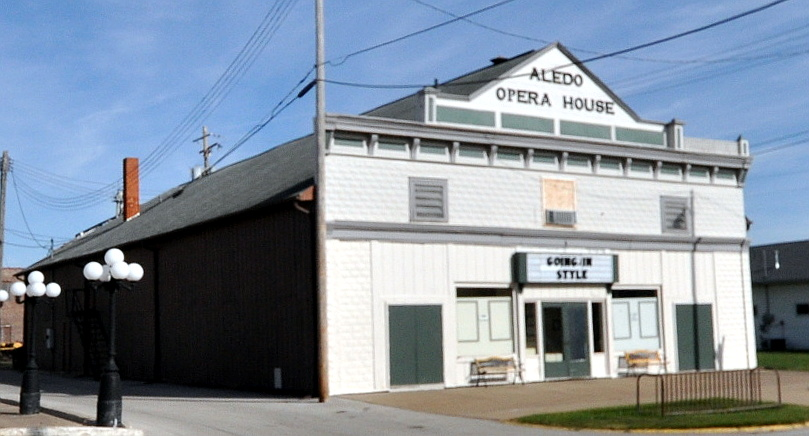
- Aledo Opera House

- Location within Illinois Location within the United States
- Location: 108 SE 2nd Ave, Aledo, Illinois
- Coordinates: 41°12′4″N 90°44′52″W
- Built: 1885
- Architectural style: Italianate
- NRHP reference No.: 16000328
- Added to NRHP: June 7, 2016

The Aledo Opera House, located in downtown Aledo, Illinois, is a historic entertainment venue with roots dating back to 1885. Originally constructed as the Aledo Roller Skating Rink, the building was converted into an opera house in 1904. Over its history, it has hosted cultural, social, and entertainment events, including live theater, music, and cinema. In 2016, the building was added to the National Register of Historic Places as a contributing structure to the Downtown Aledo Historic District. In 2024, major renovation began on the structure with the intent to operate as a movie theater and performing arts venue.

== History ==
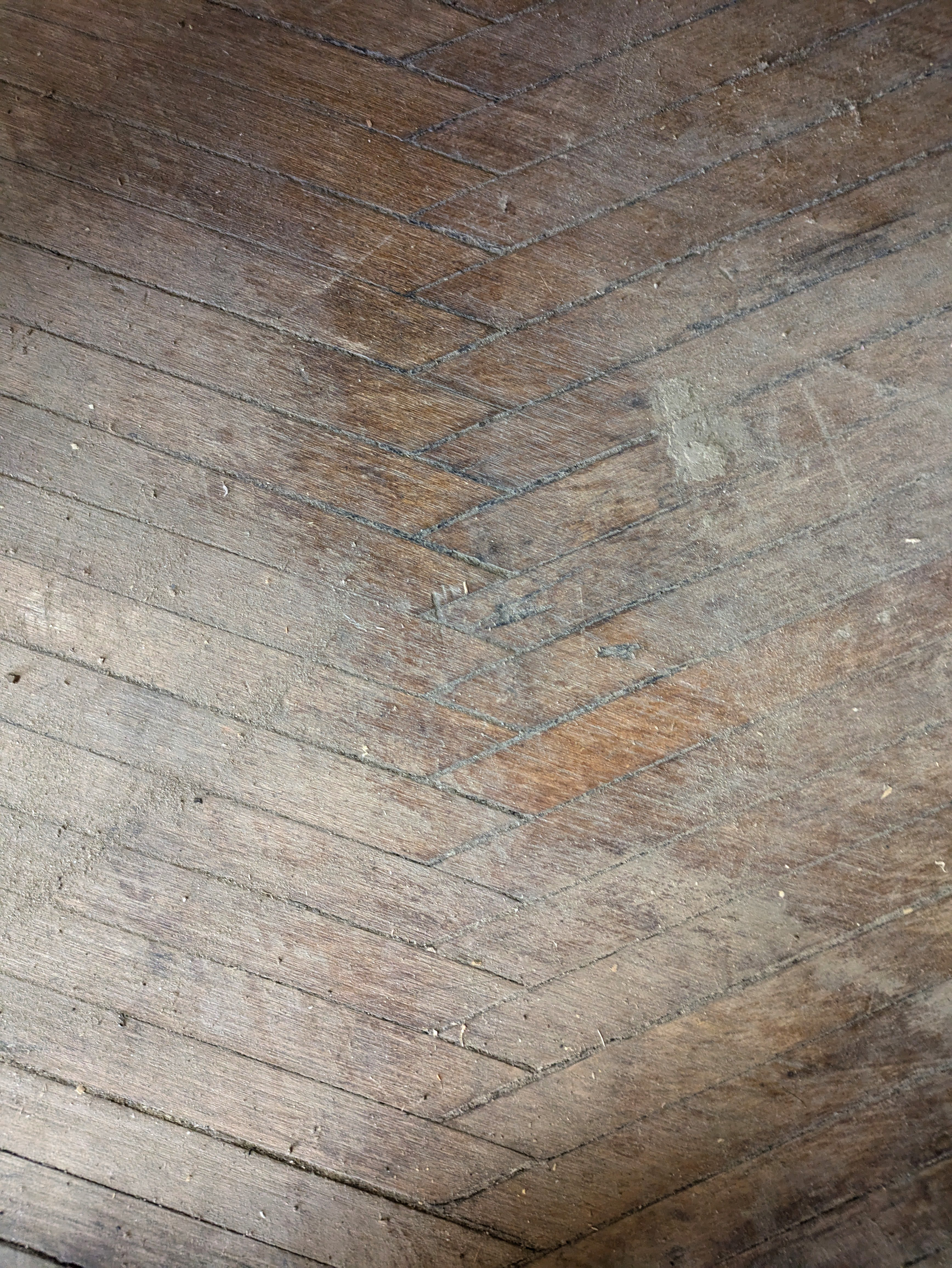
The hardwood flooring, originally installed for a roller skating rink from circa 1885, is unique as it was laid on edge and forms an ovular track.

Constructed in 1885, the building originally served as the Aledo Roller Skating Rink. The distinctive hardwood flooring which is laid on edge is still present throughout the main level of the theater. The skating rink had early financial success, paying 27 percent dividends to investors in 1885. Possibly due to a fire, by July 1886 the skating rink had been transformed into a lumber shed.

The community's desire for a large public gathering space was driven by the lack of suitable alternative locations. One such space, Aledo House, was a narrow three-story brick building which was deconstructed between 1893-1894 to make way for the construction of the Mercer County Courthouse. The other space, Union Hall (located on the second story of 113 S College Ave), was used as a gathering space for some time, however the location was considered unsuitable for a large crowd, partly due to the narrow staircase leading to the space. In response to community demands for a safer, more accommodating gathering space, the former roller skating rink building was renovated and reopened as an opera house in 1904, under the management of John W. Edwards, a Civil War veteran and prominent local businessman.

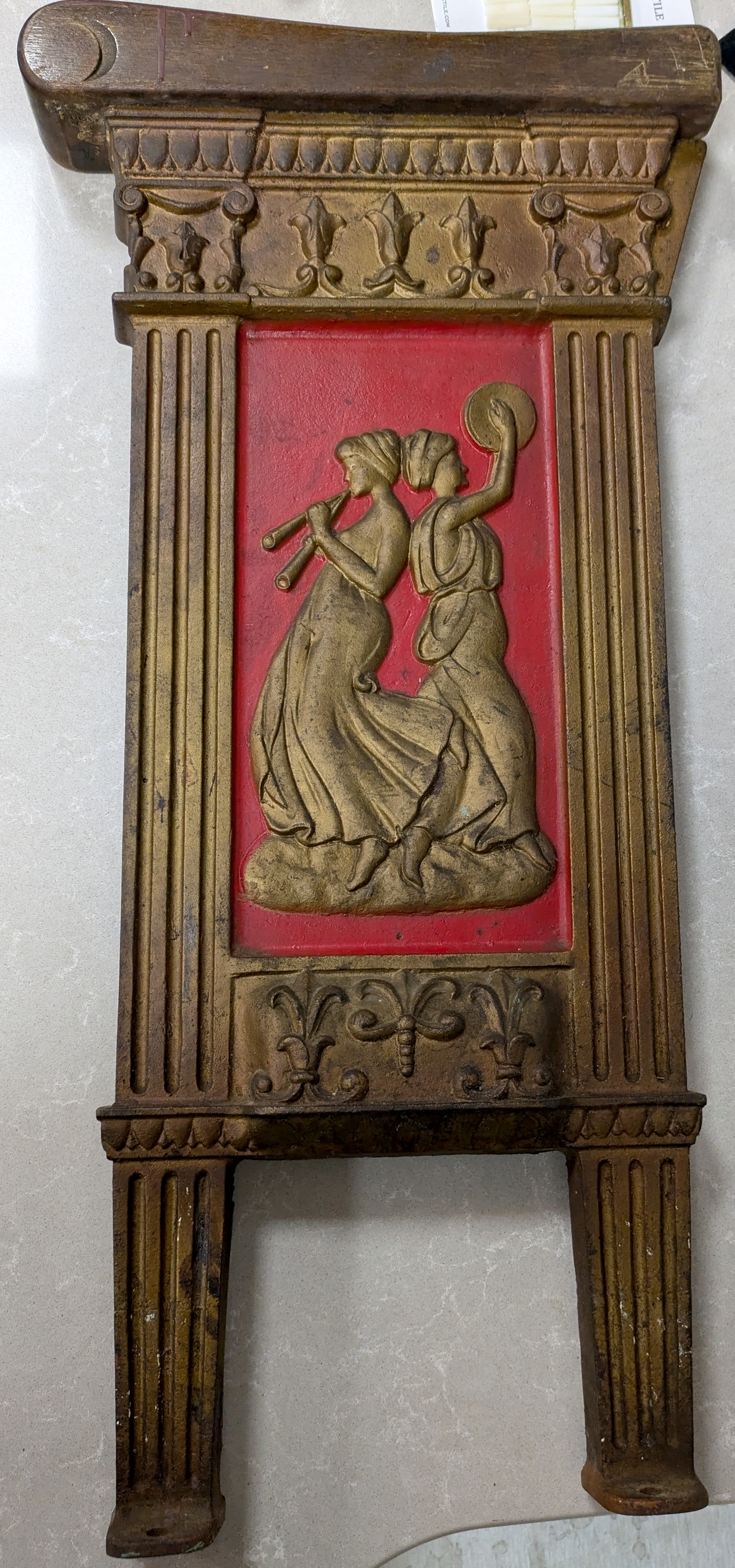
An end cap to a row of seating which was likely installed in the theater around 1926 depicts two musicians.

The Aledo Opera House officially opened in February 1904 with a performance of Quincy Adams Sawyer by Charles Felton Pidgin which was attended by 775 patrons. In 1909, a movie projector was installed for the first time. The venue's early years featured theatrical productions, vaudeville acts, and silent films.

Through the 1910s, the opera house was utilized as a gathering place for the community for events such as the Old Fiddlers' Contests, roller-skating broomball games, dramatic presentations by the William & Vashti College, debates between local colleges, political speeches, soldiers reunions, dances, banquets, religious gatherings, and even educational classes. By 1913, under the management of Mrs. Vivian E. Gmelin of Chicago, the opera house began nightly showings of silent films, accompanied by live music performed on piano and occasionally illustrated songs by singers.

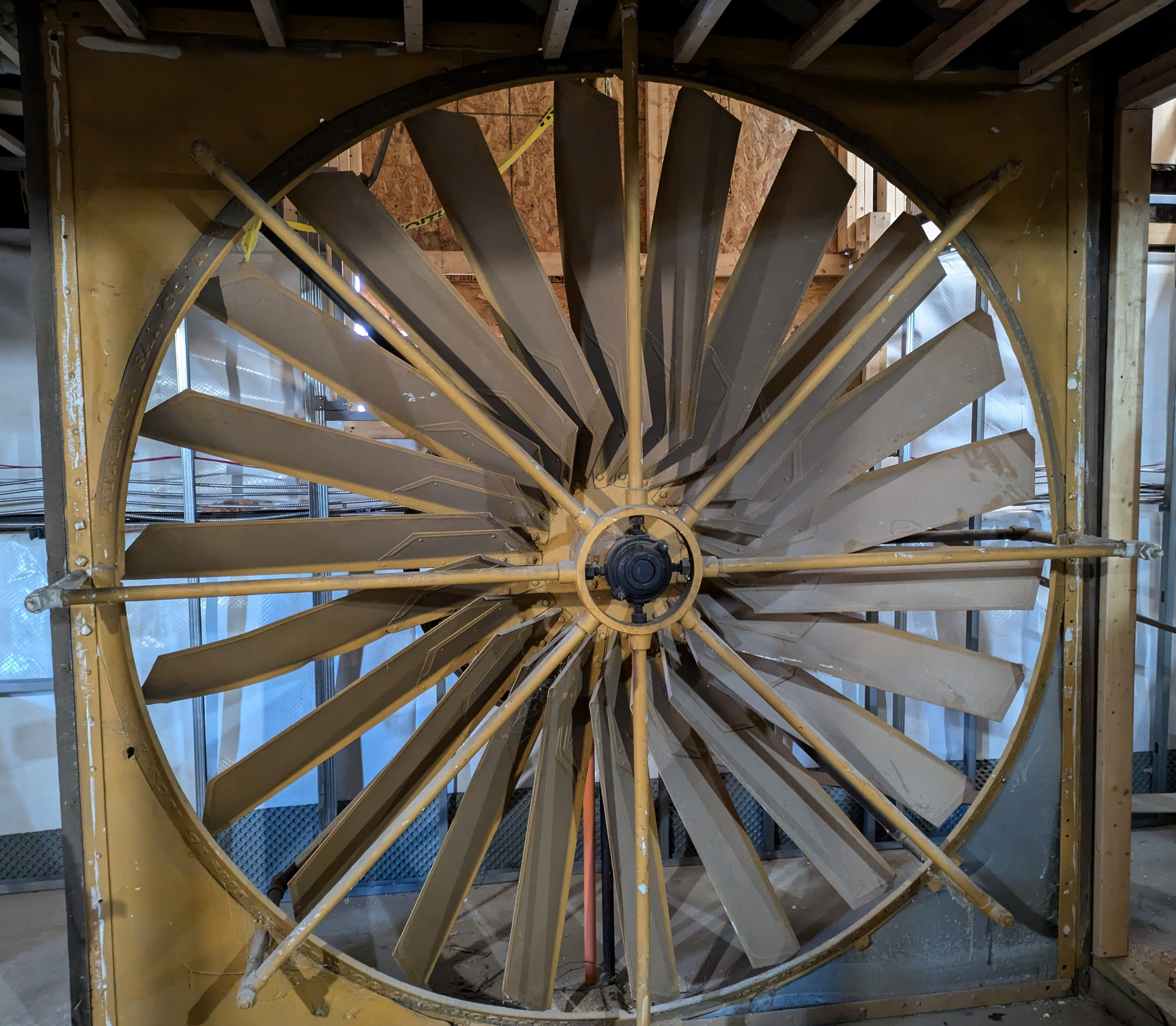
An 8 foot (2.4m) fan which was part of an evaporative cooling system installed in a theater around 1917.

In 1917, a cooling system was installed consisting of an 8 foot fan and a five horsepower motor. The cooling system worked via evaporative cooling and featured a trough where water was sprayed onto a large block of ice. In 1920, J. W. Edwards remodeled the entire front of the building with a wide entrance and restrooms. The interior and exterior were refinished and repainted. Later that year, Edwards added a new sign board to the front of the building. The sign was made of wood and had several tin letters in order to announce the movie each night. In 1922, Edwards installed the first wireless radiophone in Aledo inside the theater. This technology allowed patrons to hear music and speeches given within a range of approximately 800 miles.

In 1923, the opera house was leased to Mr. Leslie "Les" Trevor, who had previously managed the Empire theater on South College Avenue in Aledo. Under the management of Les Trevor in the late 1920s, the theater adapted to sound films ("talkies"). In 1926, Trevor installed new seats and redecorated the interior.

In 1928, Les Trevor retired from the business. At this time, Selma Edwards, the wife of J. W. Edwards, took over management of the theater. In 1931, inch-thick bulletproof glass was installed in the box office window. This glass and the sheet steel surrounding box are still in place. When Mr. Edwards died in December of 1931, ownership of the theater transferred to Selma. During the Great Depression, Mrs. Edwards would deliberately let kids sneak in for free. For a few years during World War II, Selma leased the building to Burdette Ross, who operated the nearby Tivoli Theatre.

From its opening in 1904 through the 1930s, the opera house experienced numerous noteworthy events, including fires in 1907, 1925, and 1930, lightning strikes in 1926 and 1934, community debate surrounding the allowance of Sunday movie screenings in 1922, a break-in in 1935, and a loose goat in the auditorium in 1932.

In 1956, Selma's daughter, Sydnie, took over management with her husband Harry Haines and the couple continued to operate the theater until 1972, when the theater was sold to settle the estate of Selma Edwards. In 1973, Sydnie's son, Richard "Dick" Edwards Maynard, bought the theater and operated it with his wife, Jennie. Although Dick wasn't interested in running a movie theater, he didn't want to see the building torn down. Dick eventually announced that he would close the theater in December of 1986, citing low attendance as a result of competition from TV, VCR, and larger multi-plex theaters in larger cities.

Almost immediately after closing the doors, the community came together to keep the theater open. Art Schrader, owner of the adjacent Merchant's Hotel and Antiques, organized the effort as soon as he learned of the theater's closing. Shrader distributed questionnaires to local establishments in order to determine the level of community interest. Nearly 700 residents filled out the surveys. Of the respondents, 45% agreed to volunteer as ushers, projectionists, and concessionaires if the theater reopened. Several also volunteered to repair seats and scrape the floors. The theater reopened on February 13th, 1987, less than two months after closing its doors. Over 35 businesses donated money or materials for the reopening effort.

In April of 1990, the Opera House Stage Company was formed by a group of local volunteers. Each winter, the group would produce a stage play and each summer they would host a comedy revue called the Opera House Stage Revue. The stage revue would feature local performers, skits, and spoofs of local current events. Notable stage performances included "Harvey" by Mary Chase, "The Death and Life of Sneaky Fitch", and "The Music Man".

While Dick Maynard continued to own the theater until his death in 2018, he closed the doors on his movie theater business on June 29th, 1997. In 2002, Chris Hart worked with Dick Maynard to reopen the theater. New projector and sound systems were installed as well. In December of 2016, after the theater had been closed for two years, a local couple reopened the theater. Notably, they attempted to raise funds through community support in order to purchase a digital projector which was needed to show modern movies. In 2018, the couple closed the business.

By 2024, major renovation began on the structure with the intent to operate as a movie theater and performing arts venue.
