= Downtown Aledo Historic District =

Historic district in Illinois, United States

- U.S. National Register of Historic Places
- U.S. Historic district
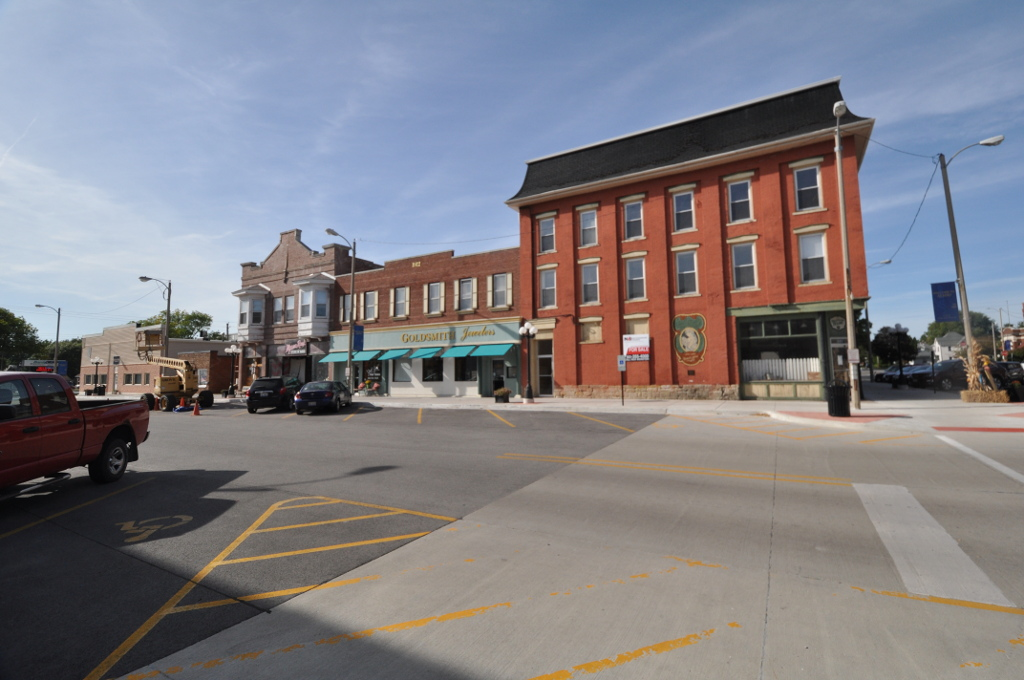
- Downtown Aledo Historic District, Aledo, Illinois.

- Location within Illinois Location within the United States
- Location: 100-200 blocks N. College, 100, 200, 300 blocks S. College, 100 blk. NW. 2nd, 200 blk. SW. 2nd Aves., Aledo, Illinois
- Coordinates: 41°12′5″N 90°44′57″W
- NRHP reference No.: 16000328
- Added to NRHP: June 7, 2016

The Downtown Aledo Historic District is a national historic district located in downtown Aledo, Illinois. The district includes 75 contributing buildings and a park. The majority of the buildings are commercial structures, but the district also includes the city's Chicago, Burlington and Quincy Railroad station and both the city's and Mercer County's major government buildings. Development in the district began in the 1850s, and the oldest surviving buildings date from the following decade. The district includes examples of many prominent American architectural styles from the mid-19th century onward; the most prevalent styles are Classical Revival, Romanesque Revival, and Italianate.

The district was added to the National Register of Historic Places on June 7, 2016. Two buildings in the district, the Mercer County Courthouse and Mercer County Jail, are listed independently in the National Register.

== Architectural Styles ==
=== Italianate ===
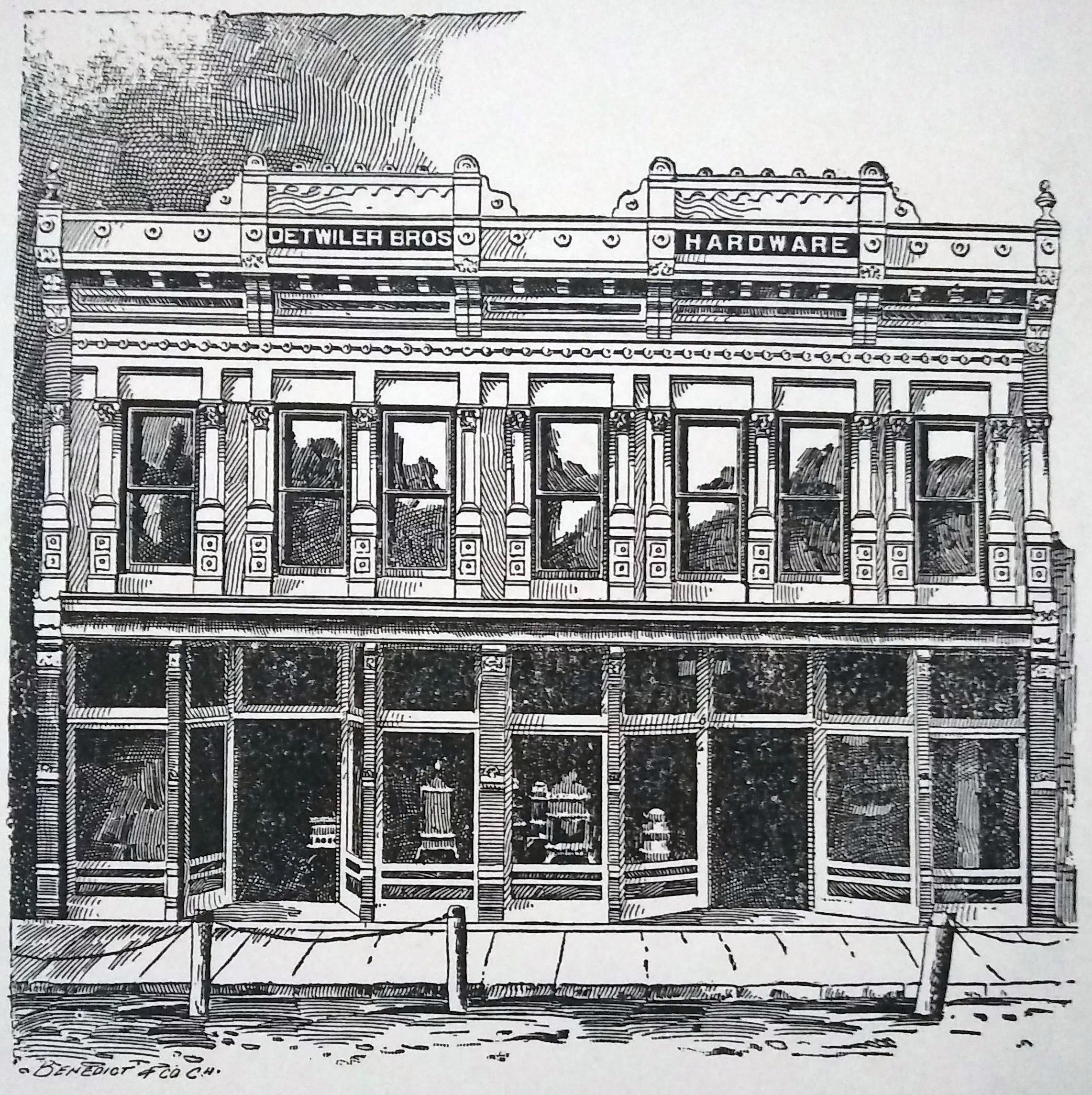
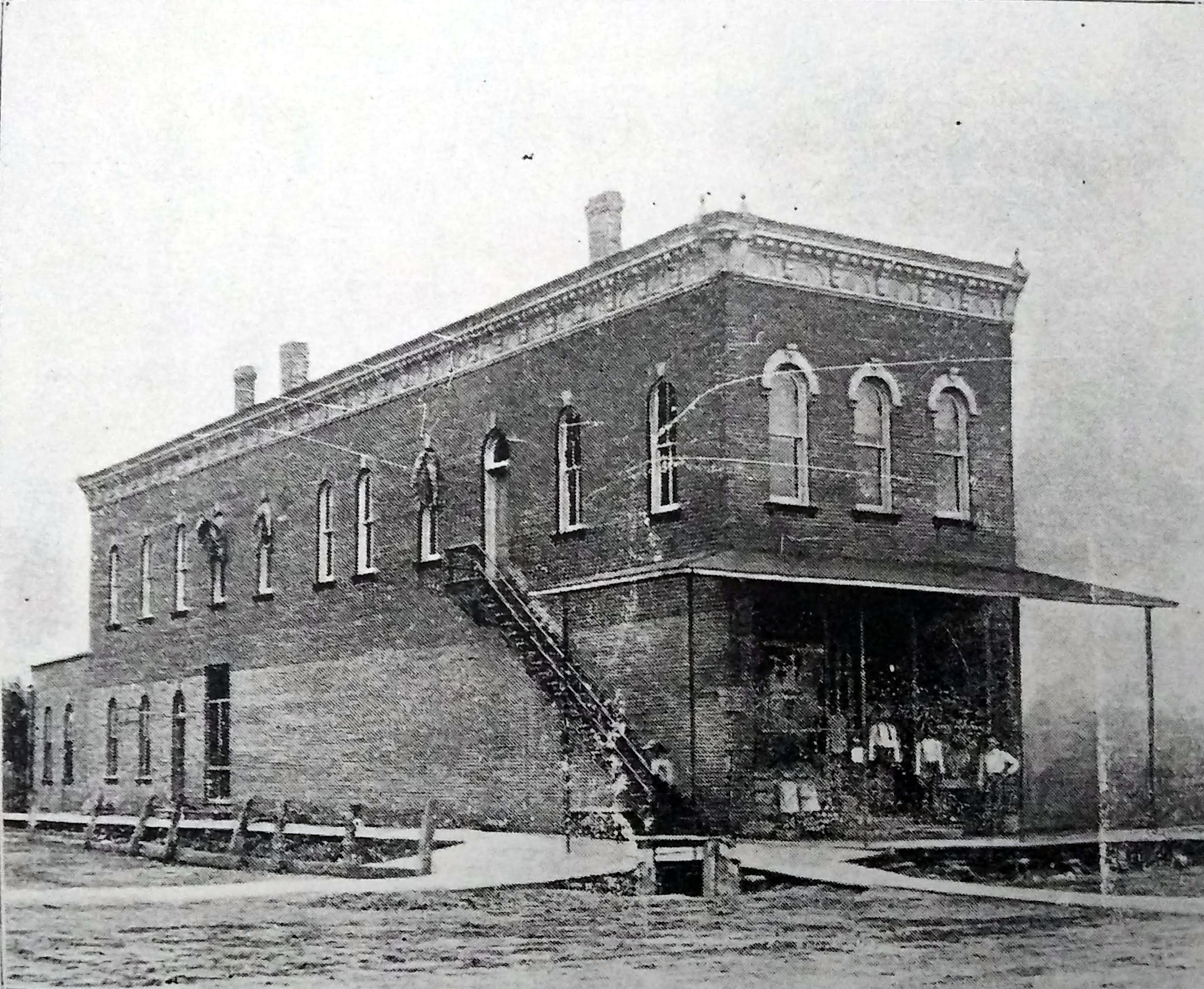

There are eleven buildings of the District identified as Italianate. Examples of the Italianate style in the District include Detwiler Bros. Hardware Store at 118 E Main St, the Marquis Bros. Building at 201 E Main St, and the former Buggie and Shay Shop at 106 S College Ave. Locally, this style of architecture was popular from 1880 to 1913.

=== Romanesque Revival ===
There are thirteen buildings of the District identified as Romanesque Revival. Examples include the Union Hall Building at 113 S College Ave, 213 S College Ave, and 109-113 E Main St. Locally, this style of was popular from 1870 to 1907.

=== Second Empire ===
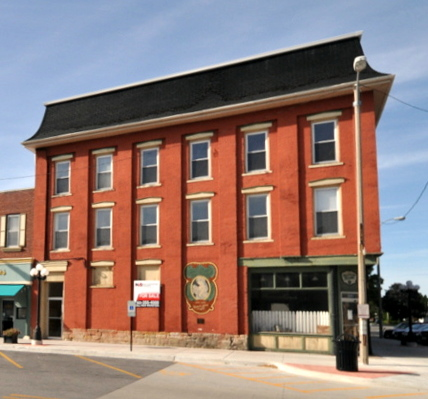
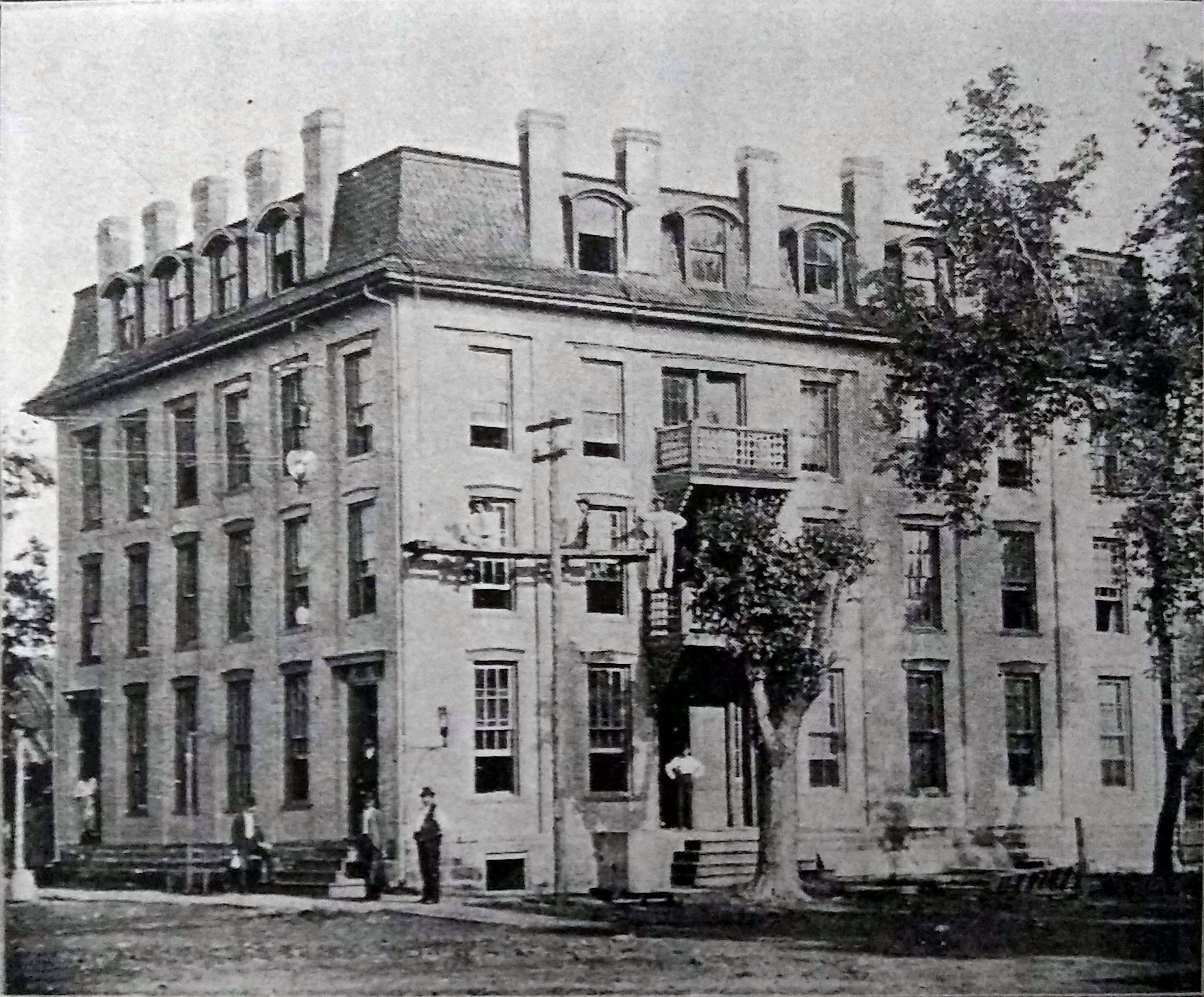

The Button House at 101 N College Ave is the only example of the Second Empire style in the District. The Button House was built in 1868.

=== Stick Style ===
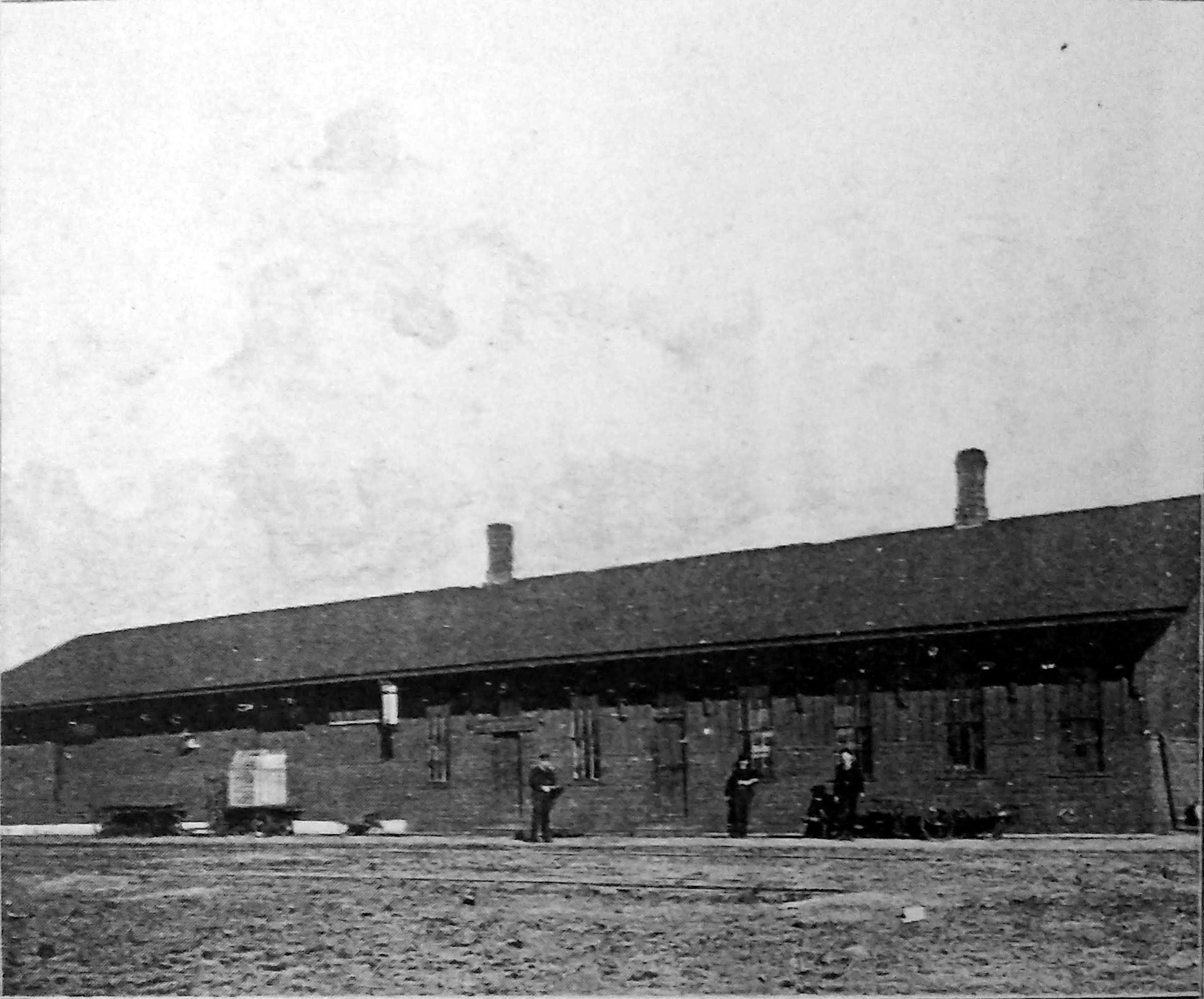

The Chicago, Burlington, & Quincy Railroad Depot at 204 SE 2nd Ave is the only example of Stick Style in the District. The CB&Q Depot was built in 1869.

=== Italian Renaissance ===
There are two buildings of the District identified as Italian Renaissance. The two examples are the service stations at 112 S College Ave, and 222 E Main St. These buildings were built from 1928 to 1940.

=== Classical Revival ===
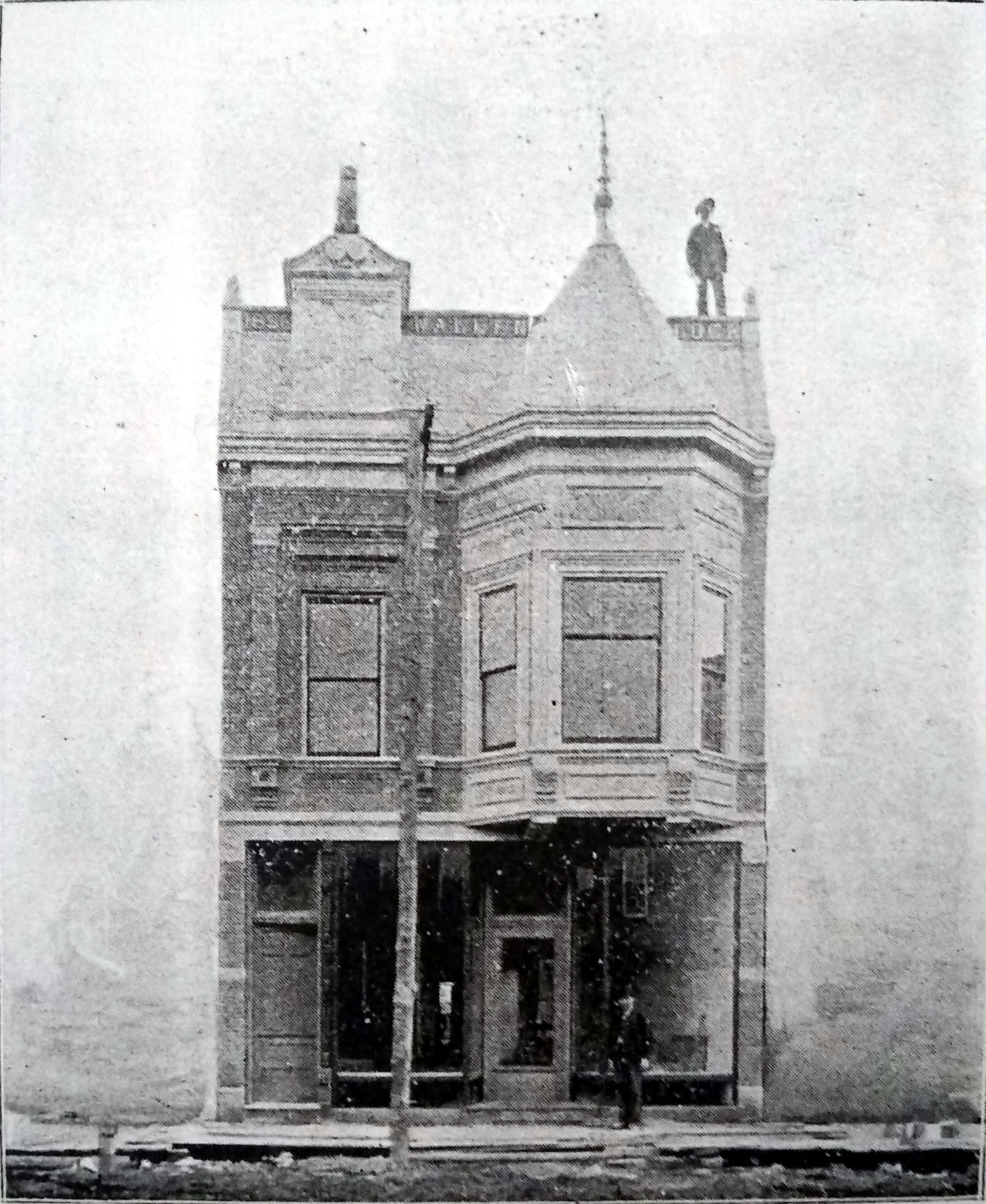

There are 25 buildings of the District identified as Classical Revival. Of the 25 buildings, four are Early Classical Revival and 21 are Late Classical Revival. Examples include the Mercer Carnegie Library at 200 N College Ave, the Wallen Block at 114 E Main St, and the rear of 118 E Main St. Locally, the Early Classical Revival style was popular from 1875 to 1880, while the Late Classical Revival style was popular from 1889 to 1938.

=== Jacobethan ===
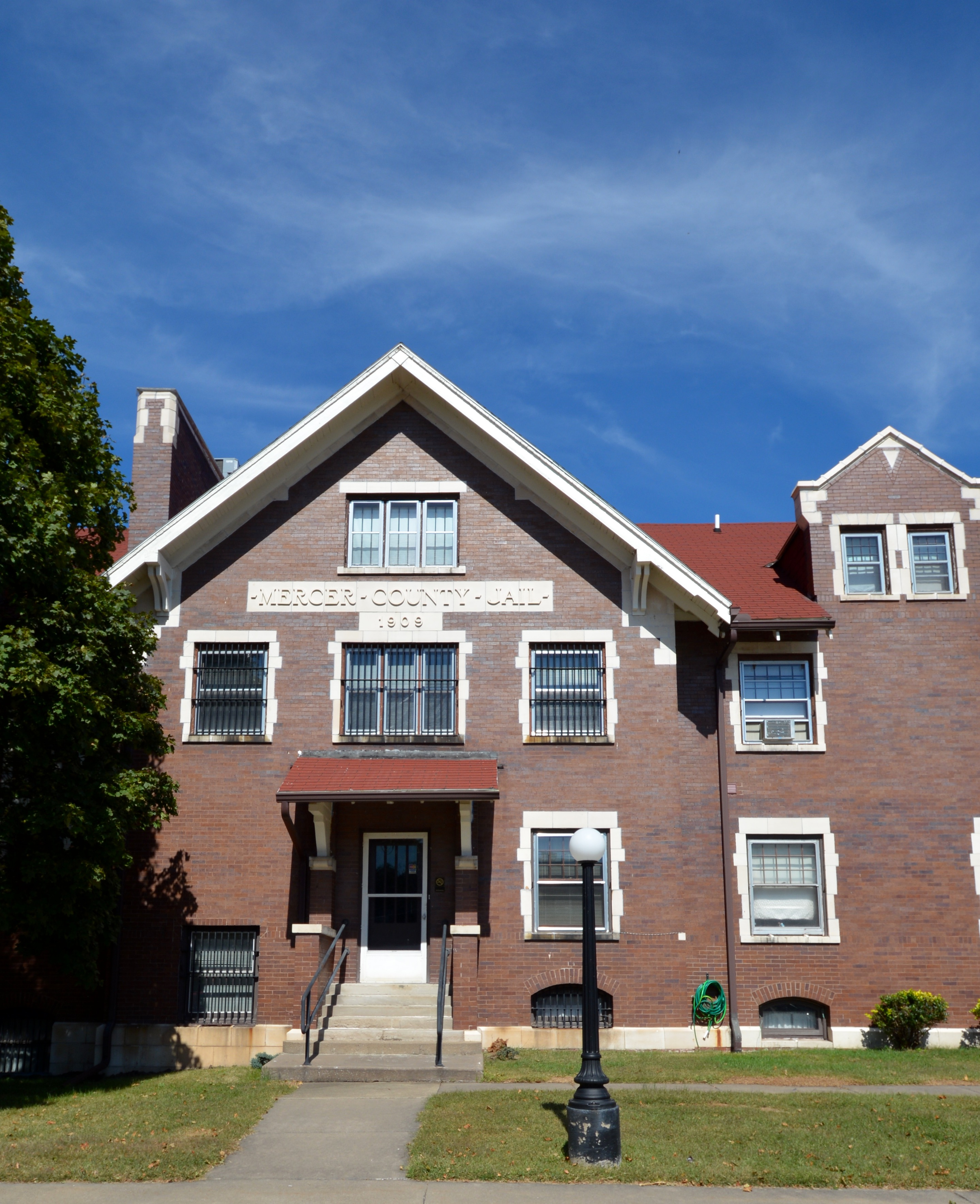

The Mercer County Jail at 309 S College Avenue is the only example of the Jacobethan style in the District. The jail was built in 1909.

=== Neoclassical ===
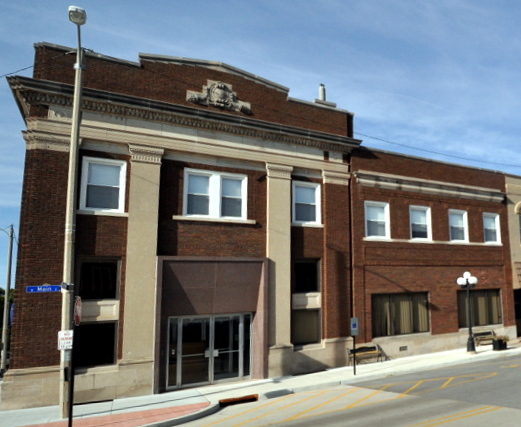

The Farmers National Bank at 101 E Main St is the only example of the Neoclassical style in the District. The bank building was built in 1917.

=== Art Deco ===
The Mercer County Farm Bureau at 206 SE 3rd St is the only example of the Art Deco style in the District. The building was built in 1940.

=== Moderne ===
There are four buildings in the District identified as Moderne. Examples include the Standard Oil Stations at 222 W Main St and 112 S College Ave. Locally, this style was popular circa 1940.

=== New Traditional ===
The McCreedy Building at 107-109 N College Ave is the only example of the New Traditional style in the District. The building was built in 1938 and continues to be popular to present day.

=== Contemporary ===
There are five buildings in the District identified as Contemporary. Examples include the Tastee-Freez at 300 SE 3rd St, the Veterans of Foreign Wars Post at 106 SW 3rd Ave, and the Farmer's State Bank of Western Illinois at 201 S College Ave. Additionally, there are eleven buildings with Contemporary style false-fronts in the District. Examples include the W.C. Galloway Grocery Store at 119 S College Ave, 115 E Main St, and 116 NW 2nd Ave. Locally, this style was popular from 1950 to 1995.

== Building Type ==
=== Commercial Blocks: One & Two Part ===
Two or more story commercial blocks may be classified as One-Part Commercial if the facade can be read as a single design element, with no projecting cornice or other strong horizontal design element dividing the first floor from the upper floors.

There are 49 Commercial Blocks in the District. Examples of the Commercial Block type can be found on the north side of the 100-block of E Main St or the west side of the 100 and 200-blocks of S College Ave.

=== Temple-Front ===
Modeled after the ancient Greek and Roman temples, these buildings are typically two to three stories in height. They are distinguished by a portico of four or more columns extending across the facade or by a recessed entry front by twin columns set in between an enframing wall.

The Farmers National Bank at 101 E Main St is the only example of the Temple-Front building type in the District.

=== False-Front ===
False-Front is an applied or fake front facade. They are identifiable by the extension of the applied front facade above the building's roofline and lack of depth to the storefront.

There are eleven buildings with false-fronts in the District. Examples include the W.C. Galloway Grocery Store at 119 S College Ave, 115 E Main St, and 116 NW 2nd Ave.

=== Freestanding ===
Freestanding buildings have architectural treatment on two or more sides. The structure may occupy an entire city block and be surrounded by parking.

There are six Freestanding buildings in the District. Examples of the Freestanding building type are the National Bank of Aledo building at 201 W Main St, Farmer's State Bank of Western Illinois at 201 S College, and Frontier Communications at 206 SE 3rd Ave.

=== Gas Stations and Other Road-Related Buildings ===
Automobile service garages are simple buildings sometimes with an office or storage above. These buildings are often masonry construction with a barrel vault or bowstring truss roof.

There are ten road-related buildings in the District. Examples are the Standard Oil Stations at 222 W Main St and 112 S College Ave, and the filling and service station at 222 E Main St.

== Table of Contributing Structures ==
Contributing Structures
Photo	Historic Name/Use	Building Number	Dir.	Street	Building Date	Building Type	Architectural Style/Details
Button House	Button House	101	N	College Avenue	1868	Two-Part Commercial Block	Second Empire
	McCreedy Building	107-109	N	College Avenue	1938	Two-Part Commercial Block	New Traditional; Classical
The Davis Building, 108-112 N College Ave, Aledo, IL	The Davis Building	108-112	N	College Avenue	ca. 1907–1913	Two-Part Commercial Block	Late Classical Revival
	Bakery	114	N	College Avenue	ca. 1907–1913	Two-Part Commercial Block	Late Classical Revival
	United States Post Office	117	N	College Avenue	1917-1918	Government/Post Office	Neoclassical
	Print Shop	118	N	College Avenue	ca. 1907–1913	Two-Part Commercial Block	Late Classical Revival
	City Hall	120	N	College Avenue	ca. 1907–1913	Government/City Hall	Late Classical Revival
	Mercer Carnegie Library	200	N	College Avenue	1915	Education/Library	Late Classical Revival
	Aledo Public High and Grade School	201	N	College Avenue	1921	Education/School	Late Classical Revival
	A. M. Byers & Co.	100-104	S	College Avenue	1870	Commerce/Financial Institution	Romanesque Revival
	Dry Goods and Notions Store	101	S	College Avenue	ca. 1870	Two-Part Commercial Block	Italianate
	Dry Goods and Clothing Store	105	S	College Avenue	ca. 1870	Two-Part Commercial Block	Italianate
	Buggie and Shay Shop	106	S	College Avenue	ca. 1895	Two-Part Commercial Block	Italianate
	Dry Goods Store	107	S	College Avenue	ca. 1885–1894	Two-Part Commercial Block	Italianate
The Palace Drug Store Interior	The Palace Drug Store	109	S	College Avenue	ca. 1880	Two-Part Commercial Block	Romanesque Revival
Knights of Pythias Hall Interior, Aledo, IL	Knights of Pythias Hall	110	S	College Avenue	1890	Two-Part Commercial Block	Romanesque Revival
Standard Oil Station, 112 S College Ave, Aledo, IL	Standard Oil Station	112	S	College Avenue	ca. 1913–1928	Road-Related/Filling Station	Italian Renaissance
Standard Oil Station, 112 S College Ave, Aledo, IL	Standard Oil Station	112	S	College Avenue	ca. 1940	Road-Related/Service Station	Moderne
	Union Hall Building	113	S	College Avenue	ca. 1880	Two-Part Commercial Block	Romanesque Revival
	Murphy Furniture Store and Billiards	125	S	College Avenue	ca. 1885–1894	Two-Part Commercial Block	Romanesque Revival/Contemporary
	Calderone's Grocery Store	129	S	College Avenue	ca. 1913–1928	Two-Part Commercial Block	Late Classical Revival
	Grocer and Social Hall	205	S	College Avenue	ca. 1880	Two-Part Commercial Block	Italianate
	Paints and Wall Papers; Drug Store	207	S	College Avenue	ca. 1894–1901	Two-Part Commercial Block	Italianate
	Grocer	213	S	College Avenue	ca. 1901–1907	Two-Part Commercial Block	Richardsonian Romanesque
	Wehner Bro's Furniture Store	217	S	College Avenue	ca. 1901–1907	Two-Part Commercial Block	Italianate
	Masonic Hall	219	S	College Avenue	1901	Two-Part Commercial Block	Romanesque Revival
	Carlson Apartments	301	S	College Avenue	1913	Two-Part Commercial Block	Late Classical Revival
	Residence	303	S	College Avenue	ca. 1885–1894	Domestic/Single Dwelling	L-Form
Mercer County Jail	Mercer County Jail	309	S	College Avenue	1909	Government/Correctional Facility	Jacobethan
Farmers National Bank, 101 E Main St, Aledo, IL	Farmers National Bank	101	E	Main Street	ca. 1913–1928	Commerce/Financial Institution; Two-Part Commercial Block	Temple-Front; Late Classical Revival
	Books and News	109	E	Main Street	ca. 1875	Two-Part Commercial Block	Romanesque Revival/Contemporary Storefront
	Will Hall	110	E	Main Street	1881	Two-Part Commercial Block	Italianate
	The Peterson Building	112	E	Main Street	ca. 1880	Two-Part Commercial Block	Early Classical Revival
	Drug Store and Stationery	113	E	Main Street	ca. 1875	Two-Part Commercial Block	Romanesque Revival/Contemporary Storefront
Wallen Block	Wallen Block	114	E	Main Street	ca. 1875	Two-Part Commercial Block	Early Classical Revival
	Grocer	115	E	Main Street	ca. 1870	One-Part Commercial Block	Unknown with Contemporary False-Front
Detwiler Brothers. Hardware Store	Detwiler Bros. Hardware Store	118	E	Main Street	ca. 1885–1894	Two-Part Commercial Block	Italianate
	Public Restrooms	121	E	Main Street	ca. 1875	Two-Part Commercial Block	Italianate
	Dry Goods Store and Offices	122	E	Main Street	ca. 1885–1894	Two-Part Commercial Block	Italianate
	Dry Goods & Notions Store	125	E	Main Street	ca. 1880	Two-Part Commercial Block	Early Classical Revival
	Emrick & Owsley Building	127	E	Main Street	1904	One-Part Commercial Block	Late Classical Revival
	Store	129	E	Main Street	ca. 1913–1928	Two-Part Commercial Block	Late Classical Revival
Store of C. K. Marquis	Marquis Bros.	201	E	Main Street	ca. 1882	Two-Part Commercial Block	Italianate
	Dry Goods and Notions Store; Grocer	203	E	Main Street	ca. 1880	Two-Part Commercial Block	Early Classical Revival
	Stevenson Brothers Grocery Store/Stevenson Flats	212-218	E	Main Street	ca. 1889	Two-Part Commercial Block	Italianate
	Filling Station	222	E	Main Street	ca. 1928–1936; ca. 1940	Road-Related/Filling Station	Italian Renaissance/Moderne
	Garage	222-224	E	Main Street	ca. 1913–1928	Road-Related/Garage	N/A
103-105 W Main St, Aledo, IL	Store	103-105	W	Main Street	ca. 1913–1928	Two-Part Commercial Block	N/A
	Butcher and Grocer	126	W	Main Street	ca. 1907–1913	Two-Part Commercial Block	Late Classical Revival
	Harness Shop, Furniture Shop, and Undertaker	132	W	Main Street	ca. 1907–1913	Two-Part Commercial Block	Italianate
	Store	133	W	Main Street	ca. 1913–1928	One-Part Commercial Block	N/A
	Harness Shop	134	W	Main Street	ca. 1885–1894	One-Part Commercial Block	Contemporary (Storefront)
	Livery	137	W	Main Street	ca. 1885–1894	Agriculture/Animal Facility	Contemporary (False-Front Facade)
	Agricultural Implements	138	W	Main Street	ca. 1875	One-Part Commercial Block	Unknown with Contemporary (False-Front Facade)
	Davison Chevrolet Motor Company	202	W	Main Street	1926 (ca. 1913–1928)	Road-Related/Auto Sales & Garage	Late Classical Revival
	Vulcanizing Shop	210	W	Main Street	ca. 1913–1928	Road-Related/Auto Garage	Late Classical Revival
	Veterinary Stable	212	W	Main Street	ca. 1913–1928	Stable	Late Classical Revival
	Veterinary	214	W	Main Street	ca. 1913–1928	One-Part Commercial Block	Late Classical Revival
	Standard Oil Station	222	W	Main Street	ca. 1950	Road-Related/Filling Station	Moderne
	Auto Garage	116	NW	2nd Avenue	ca. 1913–1928	Road-Related/Auto Garage	Contemporary (Facade)
Aledo Opera House, 108 SE 2nd Ave, Aledo, IL	Aledo Opera House	108	SE	2nd Avenue	1904	Freestanding; Recreation/Music Facility	Italianate
Chicago, Burlington, & Quincy Railroad Depot, Aledo, IL	Chicago, Burlington, & Quincy Railroad Passenger and Freight Station	204	SE	2nd Avenue	1869	Train Depot	Stick
	Bolton Brothers Electric Company	104	SW	2nd Avenue	ca. 1901–1907	Industry/Energy Facility	Late Classical Revival
	City of Aledo Water Works Pump House	203	SW	2nd Avenue	ca. 1913–1928	Government/Public Works	Unknown with Contemporary Elements
	Auto Garage	110	NW	2nd Street	ca. 1913–1928	Road-Related/Auto Garage	Contemporary (False-Front Facade)
	Billiards	105	SE	2nd Street	ca. 1901–1907	Two-Part Commercial Block	Late Classical Revival
	Johnson Creamery	107	SW	2nd Street	ca. 1928–1936	Agriculture/Processing	N/A
	Commercial	108	SW	2nd Street	ca. 1960	One-Part Commercial Block	Contemporary
	Original City of Aledo Water Works	109	SW	2nd Street	1889	Government/Public Works	Late Classical Revival
	Veterans of Foreign Wars Post	106	SW	3rd Avenue	1961	Freestanding; Social/Meeting Hall	Contemporary
Mercer County Courthouse	Mercer County Courthouse	100	SE	3rd Street	1894	Government/Courthouse	Romanesque Revival
	Central Park	100 blk.	SE	3rd Street	ca. 1913–1928	Landscape/Plaza	Contemporary
	Frontier Communications	200 blk.	SE	3rd Street	ca. 1960	Freestanding	Contemporary
	Mercer County Farm Bureau	206	SE	3rd Street	1940	Freestanding; Commerce/Office Building	Art Deco
	Filling Station	210	SE	3rd Street	1940	Road-Related/Filling Station	Moderne
	Tastee-Freez	300	SE	3rd Street	ca. 1950	One-Part Commercial Block	Contemporary
	Furniture Shop and Undertaker	103	SW	3rd Street	ca. 1901–1907; ca. 1913–1928	Two-Part Commercial Block	Late Classical Revival
	Murphy Funeral Home	103	SW	3rd Street	1938	Religious/Chapel	Late Classical Revival
