= McCurdy's Armor =

Patented portable armored wall system

McCurdy's Armor is a patented portable armored wall system intended to protect against small arms, mortars, rockets, artillery, armor-piercing rounds and suicide bombs. Constructed of aluminum frames that unfold and connect to one another using steel connector pins, McCurdy's Armor can be deployed into a full guard post by a three-person team in less than ten minutes, using no hand tools or heavy equipment. The system can be dismantled and redeployed in a similar amount of time. McCurdy's Armor includes bullet proof glass windows that provide full situational awareness and, when necessary, can be opened and used as gun ports.

== Manufacturer ==
McCurdy's Armor is made by Dynamic Defense Materials, a defense manufacturing company that was founded in 2004 by Robert Lipinski. Dynamic Defense Materials is headquartered in Marlton, New Jersey. The company uses manufacturers in Pennsylvania, New York, Ohio and Texas to produce McCurdy's Armor.

== Contracts ==
- In December 2009, Dynamic Defense Materials, LLC received a contract to supply McCurdy's Armor to the United States Marine Corps. for use as rapidly deployed guard posts in their missions in Afghanistan and Iraq.
- In March 2010, Dynamic Defense Materials, LLC received a contract to supply McCurdy's Armor to the Mexican Federal Police for guard posts to be used by personnel against the cartels in the Mexican drug war.
- July 2010, Dynamic Defense Materials, LLC received a contract to supply McCurdy's Armor to the United States Army for use as guard posts for entry control points at forward operating bases throughout Afghanistan. The contract was Phase One of a five year plan.
- In July 2011, Dynamic Defense Materials, LLC received a contract to supply McCurdy's Armor to the United States Department of State for the Afghan Export Control and Border Security program.

== Namesake ==
Originally called Evaloch, McCurdy's Armor was officially renamed in 2009 to honor LCpl. Ryan S. McCurdy, who was mortally wounded from a sniper attack in Fallujah, Iraq on January 5, 2006 during the US invasion of Iraq. At the time of the attack, LCpl. McCurdy was on duty with Cpl. Clifton Trotter, who was shot in the neck and severely injured. LCpl. McCurdy was killed by sniper fire when he left his position in an attempt to pull Cpl. Trotter to safety. Cpl. Trotter survived the attack.

Joe Dimond, General Manager of Dynamic Defense Materials and a ten-year Marine veteran, served with LCpl. McCurdy in Fallujah, Iraq. In honor of LCpl. McCurdy, Dynamic Defense Materials donates a percentage of all sales to the Ryan McCurdy Fund, a charity that has been set up in LCpl. McCurdy's name to provide a safe place for children to learn and grow in Baton Rouge, LA.

== See also ==
- Military technology
- Armor
