= Baby Songs =

- Created by: Amy Weintraub; Brooks McEwan
- Directed by: Dorian Walker; Nate Bashor; Lynda Taylor; Tery Arnold; Don Campbell
- Starring: Hap Palmer
- Country of origin: United States
- Original language: English
- No. of episodes: 13

Production
- Executive producers: Nancy Steingard; Wendy Moss; Eric Greenspan
- Producers: Amy Weintraub; Brooks McEwan
- Running time: 25-30 minutes
- Production companies: Backyard Enterprises; Hi-Tops Video; Anchor Bay

Original release
- Release: 1987 – September 25, 2001

Baby Songs is an American independent children's home video series that started in 1987 with the release of the namesake video, followed by "More Baby Songs" that same year. The series then continued to release from January 17, 1989 until it started a hiatus in 1992 before returning on January 26, 1999. It ended on September 25, 2001 after a total of 13 videos. Since its debut, more than 4 million copies of Baby Songs have been sold.

== History ==
In 1985, Amy Weintraub and Brooks McEwan founded the company Backyard Productions, now Backyard Enterprises, Inc., to release Baby Songs. Inspired by the music videos on MTV, Weintraub and McEwan created the first collection of music videos for babies and toddlers.

They partnered with American children's musician Hap Palmer, a recording artist since 1969, to create Baby Songs. The videos often feature Palmer performing either his original songs or adaptations of folk, nursery rhymes and popular songs to live children. The songs are separated by short animated video segments. Baby Songs also released videos without Palmer, often starring other singers (such as John Lithgow's Kid Size Concert). Baby Songs was originally released on VHS by Hi-Tops Video in 1987 and then by Anchor Bay in 1999. In 2003, it was released on VHS and DVD by 20th Century Fox.

The company has released 17 titles on VHS and DVD, and 4 audio compilations.

In 1992, a spin off video series titled Tales and Tunes, created by both Weintraub and McEwan, was released, targeting older children.

At least one — and at most all nine — of the pre-1992 videos aired as a segment on the TV program Lunch Box, which aired on The Disney Channel from 1989 to 1996.

== Video titles ==
1. Baby Songs (1987)
2. More Baby Songs (1987)
3. Turn On The Music (January 17, 1989)
4. Even More Baby Songs (1990)
5. Baby Songs Presents: John Lithgow's Kid Size Concert (1990)
6. Baby Songs Presents: Baby Rock (1991)
7. Baby Songs: Christmas (December 1991)
8. Baby Songs Presents: Follow Along Songs (1992)
9. Baby Songs Presents: Sing Together (1992)
10. Baby Songs: Good Night (January 26, 1999)
11. Baby Songs: ABC, 123, Colors and Shapes (August 17, 1999)
12. Baby Songs: Animals (February 22, 2000)
13. Baby Songs: Silly Songs (September 25, 2001)

== Awards ==
- Gold Award, National Association of Parenting Publications Awards, 2001
- "100 Best Children's Products," Dr. Toy, 2001
- Gold Award, Parent's Choice Awards, Spring 2000
- "100 Best Children's Products," Dr. Toy, 1999
