= Hap Palmer =

American singer

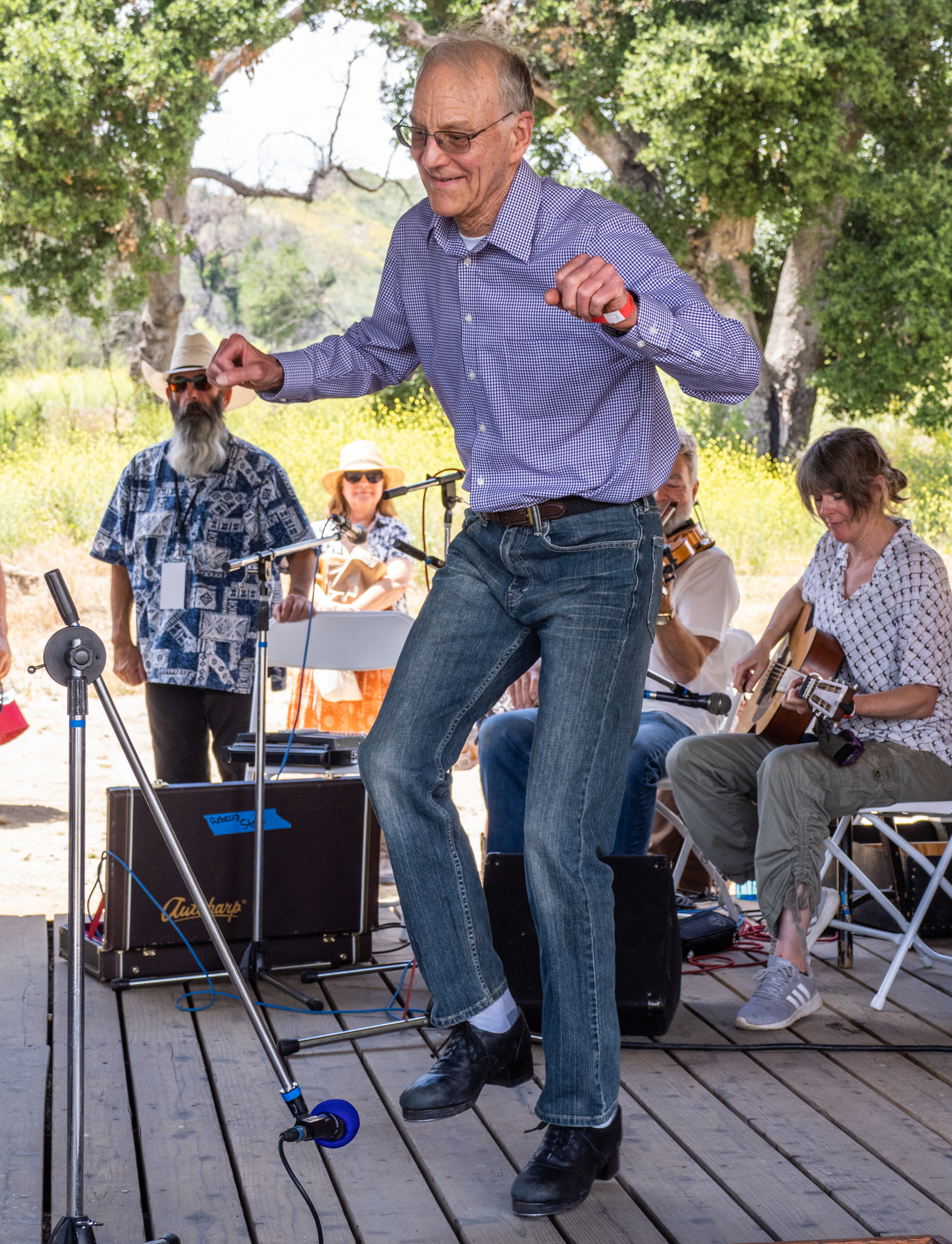

Background information
- Born: Harlan G. Palmer III; October 28, 1942 (age 83); Los Angeles, California, United States
- Origin: Woodland Hills, Los Angeles, California, United States
- Genres: Children's music; educational music
- Occupations: Musician; teacher
- Instruments: Guitar; voice
- Years active: 1969–present
- Labels: Hap-Pal Music, Inc.; Smithsonian Folkways
- Spouse: Martha Cheney (divorced)
- Website: www.happalmer.com

Harlan G. "Hap" Palmer III is an American children's musician and guitarist from Los Angeles, California. Palmer's songs specialize in topics aimed at young children, such as math, and reading, or developing motor skills. Palmer released his first recording in 1969, and has composed over 300 songs for children.

== Educating and education ==
Palmer taught from 1972 at a school for mentally challenged children, and achieved a master's degree in dance education from the University of California, Los Angeles, in 1983.

== Career ==
His early albums include the Learning Basic Skills Through Music series, (in both English and Spanish language versions) Getting to Know Myself (which features his signature song "Sammy"), Sally the Swinging Snake, and Walter the Waltzing Worm. He released the Halloween song Witches' Brew in 1978, co-written by his then wife Martha Cheney. He also released a series of DVDs and videos called Baby Songs. His album Multiplication Mountain was released on January 15, 2009, and in 2012 Palmer released a DVD of musical picture books. In 2013 Palmer released the album Count, Add, Subtract! Fun with Math, Music, and Movement aimed at teaching mathematical concepts to pre-schoolers, which was reviewed as a "fun way to teach early math concepts".

Smithsonian Folkways, the nonprofit record label of the Smithsonian Institution, published over 30 of Palmers' albums. His 2016 release received the Parents' Choice Gold Award, and the American Library Association denoted his recordings as "Best of the Best for Children".

Jill Jarlow in All Ears (Viking, 1991) called him one of America's most prolific children's songwriters, who makes innovative and award-winning recordings. Sonia Taitz in Mothering Heights (William Morrow, 1992) said he is "famous for his [song] videos".
