= TAGS =

TAGS or tags, can refer to:

- The Andy Griffith Show
- (Ag--Ge--Sb--Te) thermoelectric material
- Transparent Armor Gun Shield
- Hashtag United F.C., Essex, England, UK; a soccer team nicknamed "The Tags"
- Survey vessel (ship code T-AGS)

== See also ==
- Tag (disambiguation) for the singular of TAGs
