= T&G (disambiguation) =

T&G may refer to:

== Businesses and organisations ==
- Thresher & Glenny, a London tailors'
- T & G Mutual Life Assurance Society, an Antipodean insurer
- Transport and General Workers' Union, a defunct British trade union
- Toni & Guy, a British hairdressing chain

== Other uses ==
- Telegram & Gazette, a newspaper based in Worcester, Massachusetts, United States
- Touch-and-go landing, an aviation maneuver
- Tongue and groove, a method for connecting pieces of wood

== See also ==
- Talented and Gifted (disambiguation)
- TNG (disambiguation)
- TAG (disambiguation)
- TG (disambiguation)
