= TG =

TG or Tg may refer to:

== Arts and entertainment ==
=== Gaming ===
- The Gathering (computer party), an event in Hamar, Norway
- Travian Games, a German company

=== Television ===
- Telegiornale (disambiguation) (lit. ' television newscast')
- Top Gear, a British motoring programme
  - Top Gear (1977 TV series), the original run from 1977 to 2001
  - Top Gear (2002 TV series), a revived edition since 2002
  - Several foreign remakes; see Top Gear (disambiguation) § Television
- Windows TG, a fictional operating system in Mega64

=== Other media ===
- Throbbing Gristle, an English music and visual arts group formed in 1976
- Ferdinand Tönnies Gesamtausgabe, the complete works of German sociologist Tönnies

== Business ==
- Target group, in marketing
- Task group, a specialist group formed to solve a problem
- Theodore Goddard, an English law firm (1902–2003)
- ThinkGeek, an American online retailer (1999–2021)
- IATA airline designator of Thai Airways International

== Language ==
- Tajik language, spoken in Central Asia (ISO 639-1:tg)
- Transformational grammar, a Chomskyan theory of formal grammar

== People ==
- Thomas Hopkins Gallaudet, founder of Gallaudet University
- Timo Glock, Formula 1 driver for Virgin Racing

== Places ==
- Talbot Gardens, a hockey arena in Norfolk County, Ontario, Canada
- Târgu-Mureş, a Romanian city
- Tehri Garhwal district, a district in the state of Uttarakhand, India
- Telangana, a state in southern India
- Thurgau, a canton in Switzerland
- Togo (ISO 3166-1 country code TG)
- Torture Garden (fetish club), London, England

== Science, technology, and mathematics ==
=== Biology and medicine ===
- Thapsigargin, a tumor promoter
- Thyroglobulin, a protein
- Transgenic, the transfer of genes between organisms
- Triglyceride, an ester in body fat
- Trigeminal nerve, a cranial nerve

=== Computing ===
- .tg, the country code top level domain (ccTLD) for Togo
- Telegram (software), online messaging service
- Terragen, a scenery rendering software
- Tigera Group, a software publisher and holding company formerly known as Fortune Systems
- TriGem, a South Korean computer company
- Turbo Gears, a Python web application framework

=== Mathematics ===
- Tangent, a trigonometric function
- Tarski–Grothendieck set theory, an axiomatic set theory

=== Other uses in science and technology ===
- Tear gas, a riot control agent
- Teragram, a unit of mass equal to 10^{12} grams; equivalent to a megatonne
- Thermogravimetry, a branch of physical chemistry, materials research, and thermal analysis
- Glass transition temperature (abbreviated T_{g})

== Transport ==
=== Aerospace ===
- Tiangong space station, a Chinese spacecraft
- TransDigm Group, an American manufacturer
- Triumph Group, an American aftermarket repairer

=== Land ===
- FMR Tg500, a German sports car (made 1958–1961)
- Tank Grote, an experimental Soviet military tank
- Toyota Group, a Japanese automotive manufacturer

== Other uses ==
- TG Xers, a team in the Korean Basketball League, now Wonju Dongbu Promy
- Thanksgiving, a holiday celebrated in Northern America
- Transgender, gender identity other than sex assigned at birth

== See also ==
- T&G (disambiguation)
