= Baitz =

Baitz is a surname. Notable people with the surname include:

- Jon Robin Baitz (born 1961), American playwright, screenwriter, and television producer
- Rick Baitz (born 1954), American composer

== See also ==
- Taitz
