= Lowell House (disambiguation) =

Lowell House may refer to:

- Lowell House, undergraduate residential house at Harvard University, Cambridge, Massachusetts, US
- Lowell House (publisher), publishing company based in Los Angeles, California, US
- Lowell House (New Haven, Connecticut), settlement house based in New Haven, Connecticut, US
- Lowell Damon House, historic house in Wauwatosa, Wisconsin, US
