= Telejournal =

Telejournal or Téléjournal may refer to:

- Le Téléjournal, a national television newscast from Radio-Canada
- Telejurnal, a national newscast from Romanian Television

== See also ==
- Telegiornale (disambiguation), or TG, a typical name of Italian language television newscasts
- Telejornal (disambiguation), a typical name of Portuguese language television newscasts
