= Gifted (disambiguation) =

Someone who is gifted has an intellectual ability or other talent.

Gifted may also refer to:

== Film and television ==
- Gifted (2017 film), starring Chris Evans
- Gifted (2003 film), a British drama television film
- Gifted (Singaporean TV series), a 2018 Singaporean drama
- The Gifted (2014 film), a Filipino comedy-drama film
- The Gifted (American TV series), a 2017 American TV series based on characters appearing in X-Men comics
- The Gifted (Thai TV series), a 2018 Thai television series
  - The Gifted: Graduation, a 2020 Thai television series and sequel

== Other uses ==
- Gifted (album), a 2022 album by Koffee
- Gifted (manga), a 2021 manga by Seimaru Amagi
- Gifted (novel), a 2007 novel by Nikita Lalwani
- Gifted (novella), a 2022 novella by Suzumi Suzuki
- "Gifted" (song), a 2020 song by American rapper Cordae featuring Roddy Ricch
- The Gifted (album), the third studio album by American rapper Wale

== See also ==
- Talented and Gifted (disambiguation)
- Gift (disambiguation)
