= Martha Cheney =

American writer

Martha Cheney (born 1953) is the author of several titles in the Gifted & Talented book series, which sold more than one million copies. She currently resides in Huson, Montana. She was also a contributing lyricist to the acclaimed children's music videos, "Baby Songs", whose words were set to the music of Hap Palmer, her former husband. Cheney has a B.A. from University of North Carolina Wilmington (1975) and a M.A. (2002) and Ed.D. (2004) from the University of Montana.
