= Gifted & Talented series =

The Gifted & Talented series is a book series that has sold more than one million copies. It contained books for children and their parents. The first title in the series was Science Questions & Answers: The Human Body.

== Publishers ==
The series was originally published by Lowell House and subsequently by McGraw-Hill/Contemporary. The series was created for Lowell House in 1987 by Susan Amerikaner. It was the first series to use thinking skills in appropriate ways for young children. Many of the original titles are out of print. The series is now distributed by School Specialty Company.

== Titles in the series ==
=== For parents ===
- How to Develop Your Child's Gifts and Talents During the Elementary Years by RaeLynne P. Rein, Ph.D., and Rachel Rein
- How to Develop Your Child's Gifts and Talents in Math by Ronn Yablun
- How to Develop Your Child's Gifts and Talents in Writing by Martha Cheney
- How to Develop Your Child's Gifts and Talents in Vocabulary by Martha Cheney
- How to Develop Your Child's Gifts and Talents in Reading by Martha Cheney
- How to Develop Your Child's Musical Gifts and Talents

=== For children ===
- Reading, Writing, & Math (Grade K, Grade 4) by Tracy Masonis and Larry Martinek
- Reading, Writing, & Math (Grade 2, Grade 3) by Tracy Masonis and Vicky Shiotsu
- Gifted & Talented Math, Grade 1 by Vicky Shiotsu
- Science Questions & Answers: Dinosaurs: For Ages 6–8 by Barbara Saffer, Ph.D.
- Science Questions & Answers: The Human Body by Barbara Saffer, Ph.D., and Jack Keely
- Science Questions & Answers: The Ocean: For Ages 6–8 by Barbara Saffer, Ph.D., and Kerry Manwaring
- Gifted and Talented Puzzles and Games for Reading and Math by Kaye Furlong, Nancy Casolaro, and Leesa Whitten
- Reading Puzzles & Games: A Workbook for Ages 6–8 by Martha Cheney
- Puzzles & Games for Reading and Math: Book 2 by Martha Cheney
- Puzzles & Games for Reading and Math: Book 2: A Workbook for Ages 4–6 by Martha Cheney and Larry Nolte
- Math Puzzles & Games: A Workbook for Ages 6–8 by Martha Cheney
- Gifted and Talented Reading Workbook by Susan Amerikaner and Leesa Whitten
- Math: A Workbook for Ages 6–8 by Nancy Casolaro and Leesa Whitten
- Reading: A Workbook for Ages 6–8 by Susan Amerikaner and Leesa Whitten
- Teaching the Gifted and Talented learners: in the mainstream class by Oyesigye Robert Stuart
