= Taitz =

Taitz is a surname. Notable people with the surname include:

- Kara Taitz (born 1981), actress
- Max Taitz (1904–1980), scientist in aerodynamics, theory of jet engines and flight testing of aircraft
- Orly Taitz (born 1960), dentist, lawyer, leading figure in the "birther" movement
- Sonia Taitz, American author, essayist and playwright
