= Tagger =

Tagger may refer to:

- Lilli Tagger (born 2008), an Austrian tennis player
- Theodor Tagger (1891–1958), an Austrian-German writer and theater manager
- Part-of-speech tagging, in corpus linguistics the process of marking words in a corpus for part of speech
  - Brill tagger, a part-of-speech tagger designed by Eric Brill in 1995
- Tag editor, software that supports editing metadata of multimedia file formats
- A position in Australian rules football
- Tag (graffiti) Form of graffiti

== See also ==
- Tag (disambiguation)
