= Telejornal =

Telejornal may refer to:

- Telejornal (Angola), an Angolan national newscast on TPA
- Telejornal (Macau), a Macanese Portuguese language newscast on TDM
- Telejornal (Mozambique), a Mozambican national newscast on TVM
- Telejornal (Portugal), a Portuguese national newscast on RTP1

== See also ==
- Telejournal (disambiguation)
