= Suzumi Suzuki =

Japanese writer

- 鈴木 涼美
- Born: July 13, 1983 (age 43); Tokyo, Japan
- Education: Keio University; University of Tokyo
- Occupation: Writer
- Spouse: Shun (m. 2024)
- Writing career
- Genres: Fiction, essay, sociology
- Notable works: A Sociology of AV Actresses; If You Sell Your Body, Then Goodbye!; Gifted; Graceless

Suzumi Suzuki (鈴木 涼美, Suzuki Suzumi; born July 13, 1983) is a Japanese writer and former adult video actress. Since publishing her first book, a sociological study of actresses working in pornographic films, she has produced both non-fiction and fiction works. Suzuki's autobiographical book If You Sell Your Body, Then Goodbye! was adapted into a 2017 Eiji Uchida film. Her novel Gifted was nominated for the 167th Akutagawa Prize, and her novel Graceless was nominated for the 168th Akutagawa Prize.

== Early life and education ==
Suzuki was born on July 13, 1983, in Tokyo, and raised in Kamakura. From elementary school through middle school she attended the private Seisen Jogakuin schools in Kanagawa, but spent almost two years of that time at a private girls' school in England, where her father, an academic, was spending his sabbatical. She returned to Tokyo for high school, attending Meiji Gakuin Senior High School in Shirokane, and became involved in the burgeoning gyaru subcultural scene in Shibuya. After completing high school, Suzuki enrolled in the Faculty of Environmental and Information Studies at Keio University, and worked as an actress in pornographic films throughout her undergraduate years. She graduated from Keio in 2007 and enrolled in the Graduate School of Interdisciplinary Information Studies at the University of Tokyo to study sociology.

== Career ==
=== Early nonfiction ===
Suzuki completed her master's program in 2009 and took a job at The Nikkei, where she worked until 2014. While at The Nikkei, Suzuki turned her master's thesis into a book titled AV Joyū no Shakaigaku (lit. A Sociology of AV Actresses), which was published by Seidosha in 2013. The book focuses on the process of identity formation as adult video actresses repeatedly describe and present themselves in meetings, pitches, and interviews within the industry. In a review for the Asahi Shimbun, sociologist and poet Kiriu Minashita praised the book for its careful demonstration of how adult video actresses display agency in their identity construction rather than just becoming what consumers want, but also raised the criticism that the book might only be accounting for the few actresses who are most vocal in their self-presentation, rather than the many actresses who pass through the industry in anonymity. Writing for the Shogakukan News Post Seven website, professor Shōichi Inoue observed that the book raised questions about whether a sociological approach could distinguish between agency and compliance in the behavior of adult actresses at all, given the commodification of their personal narratives for marketing purposes.

=== Freelance writing ===
Suzuki quit her job in 2014 to help her mother, who was dealing with cancer. Her autobiographical book Karada o uttara sayōnara (lit. If you sell your body, then goodbye), a series of reflections on her upbringing, on her experience as a former adult video actress trying to succeed in the corporate world of newspaper publishing, and on broader social differences between people who spend most of their lives in daytime rather than nighttime, was published by Gentosha in 2014. Suzuki's mother died in 2016.

Within a year of her mother's death, Suzuki had published three more books. In 2017 her book Ai to shikyū ni hanataba o (lit. A bouquet for love and the womb), which contrasts the pride she feels about her family and education against her mother's longstanding sense of shame about her daughter's decisions to work as a hostess and to perform in adult videos, was published by Gentosha. In a review for Da Vinci, Yuriko Izumi found the use of colloquial spoken language in the book to be difficult to read at times, but appreciated how the emotional content of the book came through in the writing.

That same year Suzuki drew on her own experience for two more books: Ojisan memoriaru (lit. A memorial to old men), a book about men who pay for women's attention, and Onna no nedan (lit. The price of women) about the financial circumstances and practices of women working as hostesses and prostitutes. 2017 also marked her first film adaptation, with If You Sell Your Body, Then Goodbye! being adapted by director Eiji Uchida into a film starring Chihiro Shibata.

=== Fiction debut and recognition ===
For several years Suzuki continued to write essays and book reviews as a freelance writer. In 2022 Bungeishunju published her debut novel Gifted, about a daughter working in the red-light district and her relationship with her dying mother. Gifted was nominated for the 167th Akutagawa Prize. Later that year Suzuki's second novel, titled Graceless, was published in the November 2022 issue of Bungakukai, and nominated for the 168th Akutagawa Prize. Inspired by her childhood home in Kamakura, which was designed by Kisho Kurokawa, the novel follows a main character who lives in a similar home, drops out of college, and starts to work behind the scenes in the pornography industry.

== Personal life ==
In May 2024, Suzuki announced her marriage. Her spouse, who works under the name "SHUN", is a Kabukichō host, sushi chef, and writer whose regular series Waiting for you in Kabukichō is published by Gentosha.
