= Tag =

Tag, TAG, or tagging may refer to:

== Identification and tracking ==
- Tag (graffiti), a form of graffiti signature
- Dog tag, an ID tag worn by military personnel
- Ear tag, an ID tag worn by farm animals
- Electronic tagging, a form of surveillance using a device attached to a person or vehicle
- Kimball tag, predecessor to the barcode, used to identify products to a stock control system
- Pet tag, an ID tag worn by pets
- Price tag, a label declaring the price of an item for sale
- QR code or mobile tag, a type of matrix barcode
- RFID tag, passive electronic inventory stock control technology
- Toe tag, an ID tag worn by dead bodies in the morgue
- Triage tag, a tool used to classify victims of mass casualty incidents
- Tagging (stamp), the printing of postage stamps on luminescent paper or with luminescent ink to facilitate automated mail processing

== People ==
=== People with surname Tag ===
- Katrin Lea Tag (born 1972), German scenic designer and costume designer
- Kezban Tağ (born 1993), Turkish footballer

=== Other people ===
- Tag Rome (born 1961), American football player
- Alex Tagliani (born 1973, nicknamed "Tag"), Canadian race car driver

== Places ==
- Bohol–Panglao International Airport (IATA code TAG), Panglao Island, Bohol, Philippines
- Tagbilaran Airport (IATA code TAG), Tagbilaran, Bohol, Philippines; a former airport
- Trans Austria Gas Pipeline

== Arts, entertainment, and media ==
=== Fictional characters ===
- Tag (comics), a Marvel character
- Tag, a member of The Squirrels from the animated preschool show Hey Duggee
- Tag, the main character of the game ModNation Racers
- Tag, the main character of the TV series Rimba Racer

=== Films ===
- Tag (2015 film), Japan
- Tag (2018 film), US

=== Music ===
- "Price Tag", a 2011 song by Jessie J
- Tag (barbershop music), a dramatic variation in the last section of a song
- TAG Recordings, a record label
- Producer tag, a brief sound clip as the signature of the producer of the music track
- T-Rex Action Group; see Marc Bolan's Rock Shrine

=== Television ===
- Tag (TV channel), a defunct Philippine TV channel
- T@gged, a 2016–2018 American web series
- "Tagged" (The Penguins of Madagascar episode)
- "The Tag" (The Amazing World of Gumball episode)

=== Theatre ===
- TAG Theatre Company, a touring theatre company in Scotland
- The Theatre Arts Guild or TAG, a community theatre in Halifax Nova Scotia

=== Other arts, entertainment, and media ===
- Tag (advertisement), a sportswear commercial
- Tag: The Power of Paint, a computer game
- Tag Entertainment, a film production company
- Tagged (website), a social networking site
- Tagging (graffiti), a form/style of graffiti signature
- Post-credits scene, a clip appearing at the end of some media
- The Animation Guild, a professional trade union of artists and production workers

== Brands and enterprises ==
- TAG Body Spray
- Tag Games, developer in Scotland
- TAG Group, Luxembourg
- TAG Heuer, watchmaker
- TAG Oil, New Zealand
- Tennessee, Alabama and Georgia Railway, reporting mark
- Transportes Aéreos Guatemaltecos, a Guatemalan airline

== Computing ==
- TAG (BBS), bulletin board software
- Tag (Facebook), a link in Facebook
- Tag (metadata), a more flexible form of categories
- Tag (programming), for passing parameters
- Tags (Unicode block), with formatting tag characters
- Tag, an element in several markup languages
  - HTML tag
- Revision tag, for a specific revision
- Audio tag; see Metadata § Digital music
- Tag files, an index of source code identifiers
- Tag system, a deterministic computational model
- Tag URI, a unique identifier protocol
- Technical Architecture Group, a W3C group
- Tag management system, used to manage the life cycle of digital marketing tags

== Government and political organizations ==
- State adjutant general, US
- Tactical Assault Group, Australia
- Tamils Against Genocide
- Treatment Action Group, an HIV/AIDS activist organization
- -Tag, a German word for "Diet" or "Assembly" (see: Bundestag)

== Language and education ==
- Tag (Hebrew writing), a decoration
- Tag (LeapFrog), an interactive reading device
- Hashtag
- Part-of-speech tagging
- Tag question, a statement converted to a question
- Talented and Gifted program, in education
  - School for the Talented and Gifted, Dallas, Texas, US
- Tree-adjoining grammar

== Natural science ==
- 3-methyladenine DNA glycosylase I, called TAG in E. coli
- Protein tag, a biochemistry method
- Skin tag, a small benign tumour
- Theoretical and Applied Genetics, a scientific journal
- Timneh African grey, a parrot
- Triglyceride or Triacylglycerol, often shortened to TAG
- Tumor-associated glycoprotein, a type of protein
- TAG, a stop codon

== Sport ==
- Tag (game), a playground game
- Tag (horse), an 18th-century thoroughbred racehorse
- Tag out, a play in baseball
- Tag team, a type of wrestling

== Other uses ==
- Technical research ship (ship code T-AG)
- Topological abelian group, in mathematics
- Transcendental argument for the existence of God

== See also ==
- T&G (disambiguation) (T and G)
- Tagged (disambiguation)
- Tagger (disambiguation)
- Tagline, a form of advertising slogan
- TAGS (disambiguation)
