= Tagged =

Tagged may refer to:

- Tagged (web series), an American teen psychological thriller web series
- Tagged (website), a social discovery website

== See also ==
- Tag (disambiguation)
