= Gun shield =

Piece of armor designed to be mounted on a crew-served weapon

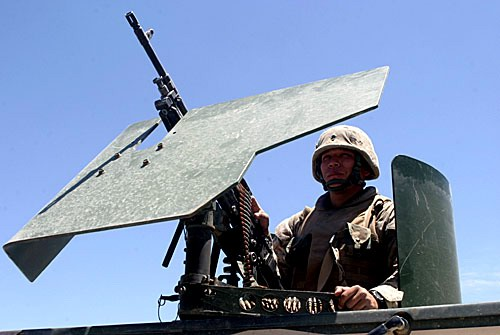
A U.S. Marine manning an M240 machine gun equipped with a gun shield

A gun shield is a flat (or sometimes curved) piece of armor designed to be mounted on a crew-served weapon such as a machine gun, automatic grenade launcher, or artillery piece.

== Military ==
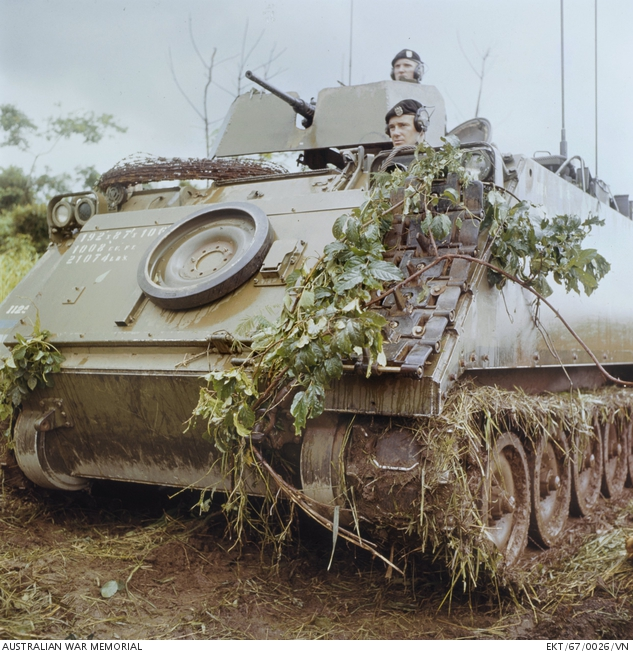
An Australian M113 armoured personnel carrier armed with an M2 Browning with a gun shield during the Vietnam War.

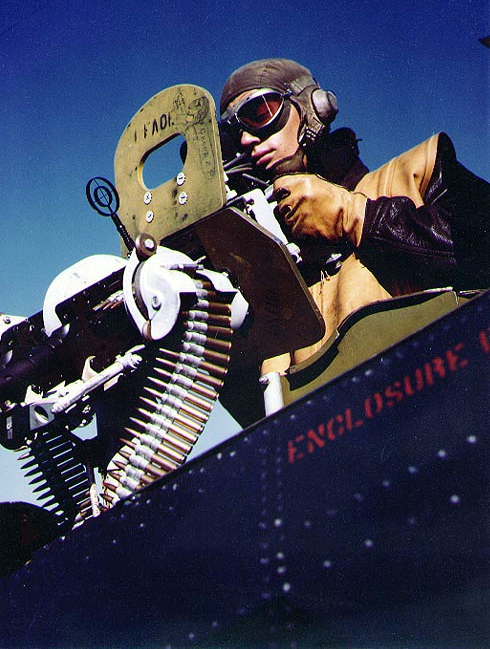
A United States Navy personnel in a Douglas SBD Dauntless aims a Browning .30 AN/M2 machine gun equipped with a shield

Some mounted machine guns and artillery pieces are equipped with metal armor plates to protect the gunners from small arms fire and shrapnel from explosions. They were fitted to some armored fighting vehicles and patrol boats during the Vietnam War.

Gun shields fell out of widespread use after the Vietnam War, but they have seen a resurgence in popularity during the 1980s and 1990s. Israeli military analysts began urging the use of gun shields, pointing to the grave risk to soldiers exposed to fire from automatic weapons. In particular, it was noted that many casualties were hit in areas not protected by body armor or a helmet, such as the neck or face.

The United States Armed Forces began using gun shields in the early 21st century during the wars in Iraq and Afghanistan. The major drawback of gun shields is that they limit the visibility of the user to the front, though new designs such as the Transparent Armor Gun Shield (TAGS for short) aim to alleviate this without sacrificing user protection.

== Gun-shield from the armoury of Henry VIII ==
There are 46 surviving examples originally from the armoury of Henry VIII at the Palace of Westminster, the Tower of London and other Royal sites. Eight gun-shields have been found on the wreck of the Mary Rose. They have been thought to be Italian in origin, as they were offered to Henry VIII in a letter of 1544 from a painter of Ravenna named Giovanbattista.

There are two distinct types of gun-shield: one of Italian manufacture and one an English version of heavier construction. There is evidence to suggest that the English gun-shields were converted from plain targets. At least two unconverted examples have been located.

== See also ==
- Ballistic shield
- Transparent Armor Gun Shield
- Gun mantlet
- Hillbilly armor
- Apilan and kota mara, gunshield and bulwark on Malay ships
