= TNG =

TNG may refer to:

== Polities ==
- Territory of New Guinea, 1920–1949
- Transitional National Government of Somalia, 2000–2004

== Science and technology ==
- Telescopio Nazionale Galileo, La Palma, Canaries
- The Next Generation of Genealogy Sitebuilding, genealogy software
- Trans–New Guinea languages, in linguistics, the Papuan language family
- Trinitroglycerin, a chemical explosive
- Samba TNG, a fork of the Samba networking protocol

== Television ==
- Star Trek: The Next Generation, an American science fiction series
- Degrassi: The Next Generation, a Canadian teen drama
- The Newlywed Game, an American game show
- Speed Racer: The Next Generation, an American animated series

== Transport ==
- TN'G, a motor scooter brand of CMSI
- Tangerang railway station, Indonesia (station code: TNG)
- Tangier Ibn Battouta Airport, Morocco (IATA: TNG)
- Touch 'n Go, a Malaysian toll system

== Other uses ==
- Kazakhstani tenge (ISO 4217 currency code), the currency of Kazakhstan

== See also ==
- T&G (disambiguation)
