= Mercer County Jail =

- U.S. National Register of Historic Places
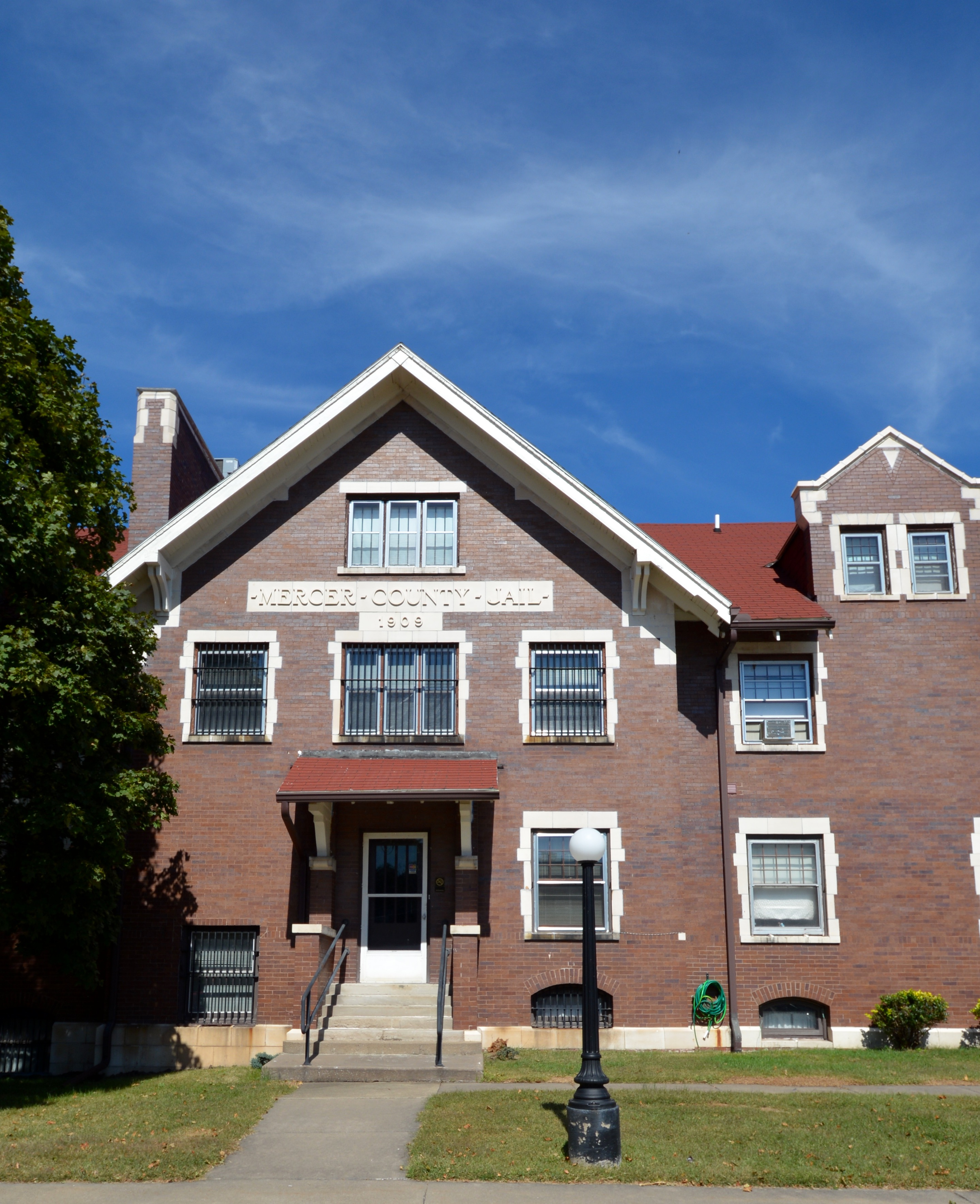

- Location within Illinois Location within the United States
- Location: 309 S. College Ave., Aledo, Illinois
- Coordinates: 41°11′57″N 90°44′58″W
- Area: less than one acre
- Built: 1909
- Built by: Harney Brothers
- Architect: Drury, Clair F.
- Architectural style: Tudor Revival
- NRHP reference No.: 97000816
- Added to NRHP: July 25, 1997

The Mercer County Jail is a historic county jail building located at 309 South College Avenue in Aledo, Mercer County, Illinois. Completed in 1909, the building was the county's third jail and its second in Aledo. Architect Clair F. Drury of Moline designed the Tudor Revival building. The two-story brick building features terra cotta ornamentation, including quoin-like window surrounds. The building's cross gabled roof has a large gable above the main entrance; both its gables and its dormers are parapeted. The jail served the county until a new jail was completed in 1989; it was later converted to a private business.

The building was added to the National Register of Historic Places on July 25, 1997.
