= G&T =

G&T can mean:

- Gin and tonic
- Geometry & Topology — a peer-refereed, international mathematics research journal.
- Geometry and trigonometry
- the Gifted and Talented
- a Gifted and Talented program
- Generation & Transmission cooperative (wholesale energy provider)
- Gramophone & Typewriter Ltd
- G&T Crampton, an Irish construction company
