= TAG Oil =

Canadian-based oil and gas company

TAG Oil Ltd.
- Type: Public
- Traded as: TSX-V: TAO
- Headquarters: Vancouver, Canada
- Key people: Alex P Guidi, Chairman; Toby Pierce, CEO
- Production output: 1,263 BOE/d
- Revenue: ▼$ 53,737,165 (F2015)
- Operating income: ▼$ 27,793,187 (F2015)
- Website: www.tagoil.com

TAG Oil is a Canadian-based oil and gas company headquartered in Vancouver, Canada, and traded on the TSX Venture Exchange under trading symbol “TAO”. TAG production and exploration activities are located in the Taranaki basin of New Zealand.

== Activities ==
TAG Oil is developing its 100%-owned, Cheal and Sidewinder oil and gas fields in the onshore Taranaki Basin, and has rights to undeveloped prospective formations in Taranaki. The Taranaki basin is still lightly explored compared to many comparable rift complex basins of its size and potential.

The Company operates exploration and production permits in the Taranaki Basin, including a 40 percent interest in shallow water offshore permit Kaheru, which amounts to 57,000 net acres of land onshore and 21,000 net acres offshore.

TAG owns its production infrastructure and associated pipeline network, linking gas that the company produces to the main Taranaki distribution pipeline. The oil produced is sold to Australasian refineries.

There has been local opposition to drilling activities in Taranaki.

In 2015, TAG relinquished its rights to a petroleum exploration permit for Waitangi Hill, and has halted plans for various exploration projects.

== Leadership ==
TAG was founded by Alex P. Guidi, who is also the Chairman of the Company.

In June 2015, Toby Pierce became Chief Executive Officer of TAG Oil. Other executives include CFO Chris Fergusen and COO Henrik Lundin.

The TAG Oil Board consists of Brad Holland, Keith Hill, Ken Vidalin and Dr. David Bennett.

== Subsidiaries ==
- TAG Oil (NZ) Limited
- TAG Oil (Offshore) Limited
- Cheal Petroleum Limited
- Trans-Orient Petroleum Ltd
- Eastern Petroleum (NZ) Limited
- Orient Petroleum (NZ) Limited
