= Transparent Armor Gun Shield =

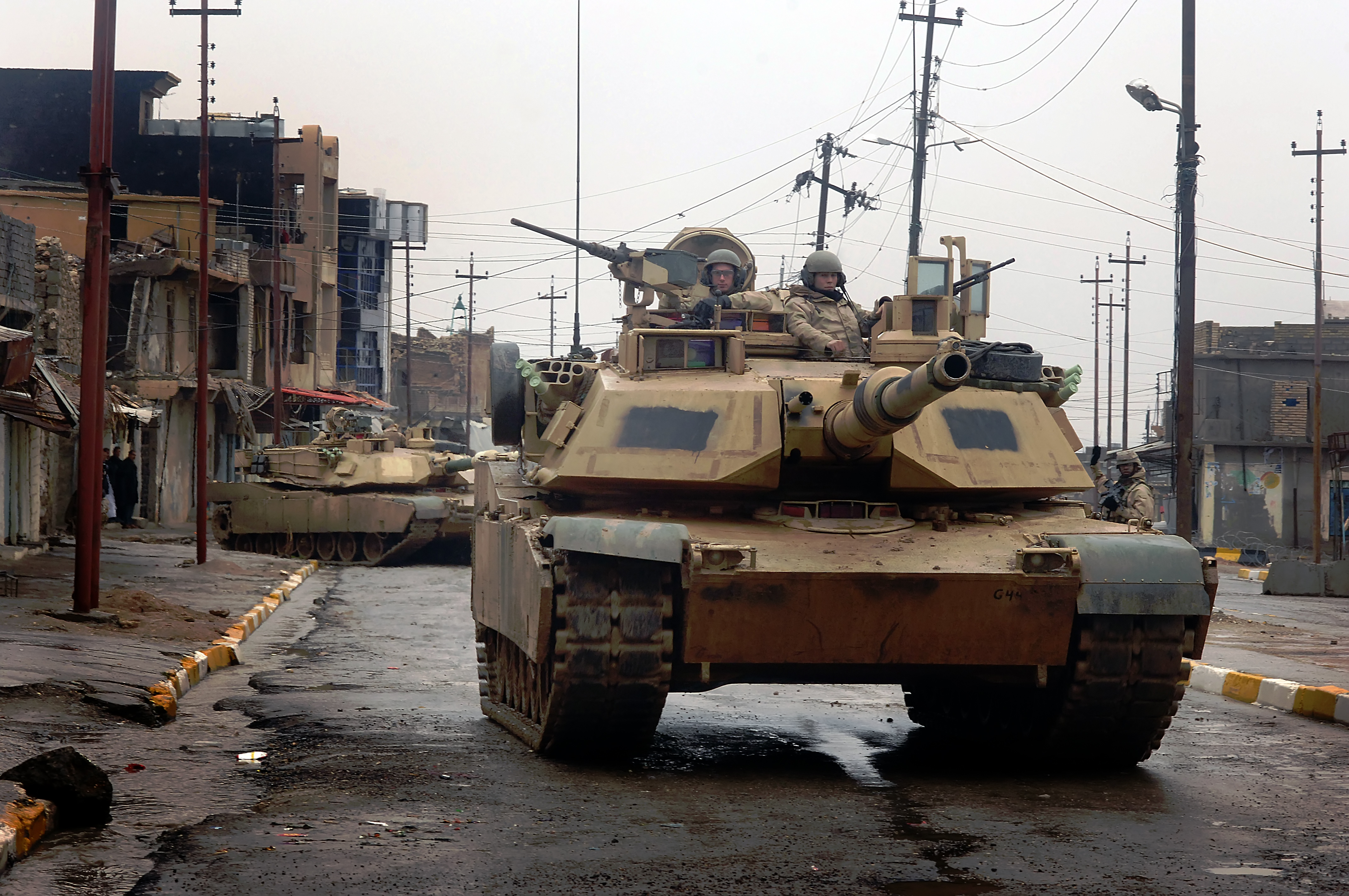
TAGS installed on the loader's M240 machine gun on top of M1A2 Abrams tank. (U.S. Army patrol in the city of Tall Afar, Iraq, on February 3, 2005.)

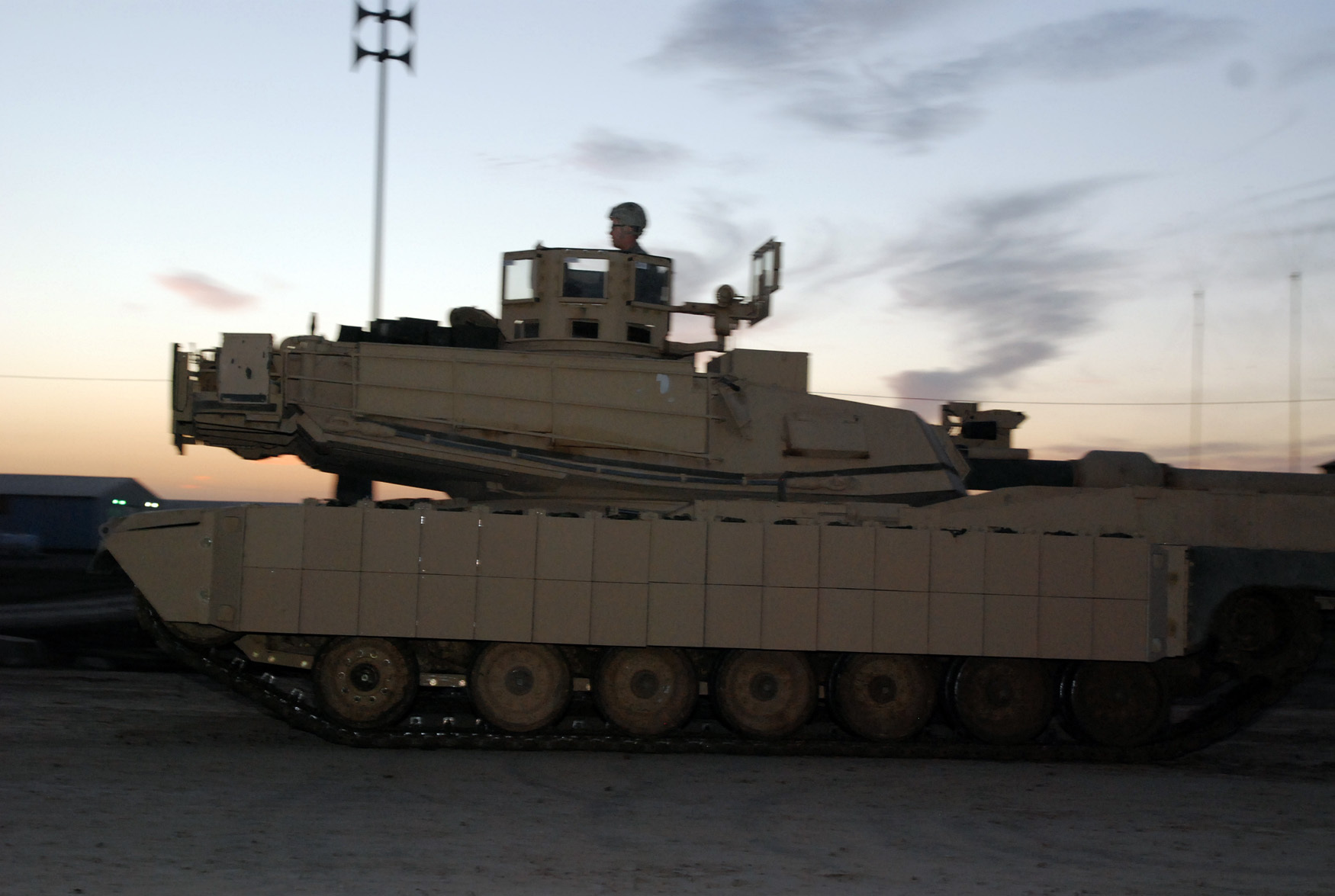
TAGS on an M1A2 in Iraq

The Transparent Armor Gun Shield, or TAGS, is a visually transparent protective gun shield built by BAE Systems made with ballistic glass for US military vehicle operators using mounted machine guns. It borrows on the experience of the Israeli Defense Force in using such armor on a variety of vehicles. The shield is intended to provide protection for its user while maintaining visibility. It can be mounted on several models of armoured fighting vehicles (AFVs), including the M113, M1 Abrams and Stryker, as well as on the HMMWV.
