= Gifted (novella) =

2022 debut novella by Suzumi Suzuki

- Author: Suzumi Suzuki
- Translator: Allison Markin Powell
- Language: Japanese
- Publisher: Bungeishunju
- Publication date: July 12, 2022 (Japanese); October 1, 2024 (English)
- Publication place: Japan
- Pages: 118 (Japanese); 120 (English)
- ISBN: 978-4163915722
- Followed by: グレイスレス (Graceless)

Gifted (ギフテッド, Gifuteddo) is the debut novella by Suzumi Suzuki, published in 2022 by Bungeishunjū. It was nominated for the 167th Akutagawa Prize along with four other books, all written by women. In 2024, an English translation by Allison Markin Powell was published by Transit Books.

== Synopsis ==
Based on Suzuki's experiences as an adult film actress and hostess, the book follows a woman living in Tokyo's red-light district as she contends with her mother's eventual death, her place in the sex work industry, and her recollections of her late friend, Eri.

== Critical reception ==
=== Japanese ===
The book was nominated for the 167th Akutagawa Prize, running for the award against four other books. There were nine judges.

Eimi Yamada wondered whether parts of the novel could be written more simply. Masahiko Shimada appreciated the threads woven between each character and lauded the novel's ending poem. Yōko Ogawa stressed the cruelty of the mother character. Hisaki Matsuura was impressed by Suzuki's hardboiled writing style and how it descriptively captured the woman protagonist's mind state through events. Shuichi Yoshida called the novel's mother-daughter relationship moving and found the novel's ending poem well-executed but slightly lamented that the novel seemed like naniwabushi, or a sob story. Keiichiro Hirano was less convinced about Suzuki's originality in the realm of mother-daughter stories. Hikaru Okuizumi commended Suzuki's talent, style, and prose but criticized that the novel felt too held together by death. Hiromi Kawakami observed the novel's sense of embodiment, more strongly feeling the body of the woman protagonist but not her mother's. Toshiyuki Horie found much to be desired in the novel's ending poem.

In a book event, Shimada said that he nominated the book for the 167th Akutagawa Prize for its skillful quality toward the "toxic parent" genre of literature that has become very popular in Japan. At the same book event, Shinji Miyadai lauded Suzuki's narrative style and approach to women characters.

=== English ===
The New Yorker briefly reviewed the book, calling it an "unsentimental novella" and included it in their Best Books We've Read This Week on October 30, 2024. Words Without Borders lauded Powell's translation of the narrator's internal conflicts regarding womanhood and later stated "Gifted explores what it would require for a woman to fully own her own body, and its lack of clear answers indicates what a perplexing question that remains." The Asian Review of Books called the book "a unique and propulsive story" and likened its sensibilities to Convenience Store Woman by Sayaka Murata.
