= Anchor Bay =

Anchor Bay may refer to:

- Anchor Bay, California
- Anchor Bay, Michigan
- Anchor Bay Entertainment, a home video company
- Anchor Bay High School, a school in Fair Haven, Michigan
- The location of Popeye Village, in Malta
