= Mercer County Courthouse (Illinois) =

Local government building in the United States

- U.S. National Register of Historic Places
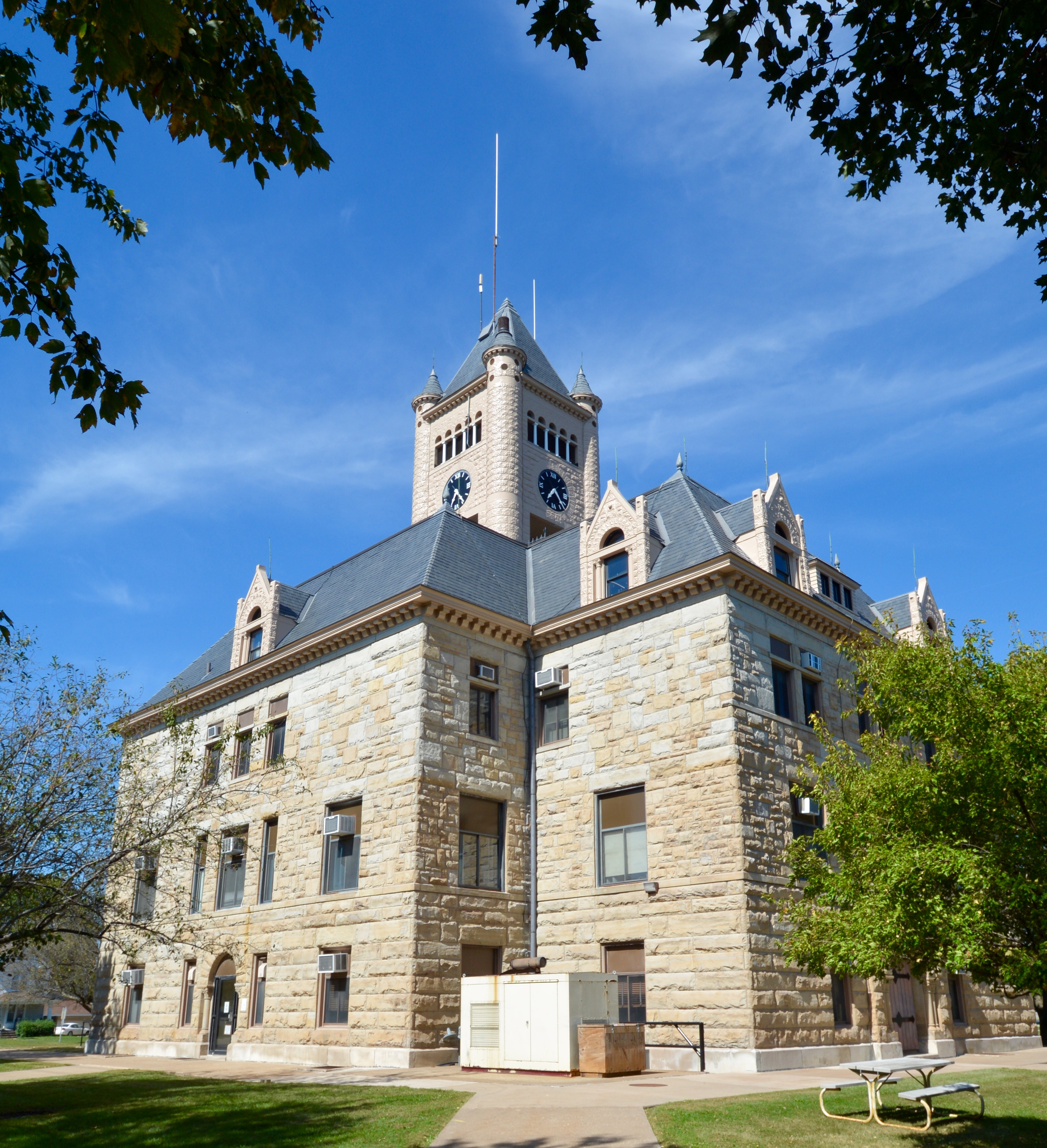

- Location within Illinois Location within the United States
- Interactive map showing the location of Mercer County Courthouse
- Location: 100 SE 3rd St. (IL 17), Aledo, Illinois
- Coordinates: 41°11′58″N 90°44′55″W
- Area: less than one acre
- Built: 1894
- Built by: L.L. Leach & Sons
- Architect: M.E. Bell
- Architectural style: Romanesque
- NRHP reference No.: 82002589
- Added to NRHP: June 17, 1982

The Mercer County Courthouse, located on Southeast 3rd Street (Illinois Route 17) in Aledo, is the county courthouse serving Mercer County, Illinois. The courthouse was authorized in 1893 to accommodate the growing county's needs and completed the following year. Architect Mifflin E. Bell designed the Romanesque Revival building; he later expanded upon the same plans to design the DuPage County Courthouse. The three-story sandstone building has arched entrances on all four sides. A clock tower rises above the center of the building, and several dormers project from the sides of the roof.

The courthouse was added to the National Register of Historic Places on June 17, 1982.
