= Sonia Taitz =

American author, essayist and playwright

Sonia Taitz is an American author, essayist and playwright. She has written for The New York Times, as a columnist at the New York Observer, and served as contributing editor for Child, a New York Times publication. Her books include Mothering Heights, the novels In The King's Arms and Down Under, and a literary memoir, The Watchmaker's Daughter.

== Early life and education ==
Taitz was born in New York City to immigrant Holocaust survivors. She grew up in speaking Yiddish in the home. At four years old, she was sent to an Orthodox Yeshiva where she learned Hebrew and Torah studies. She later transferred to The Ramaz School, graduating as its Hebrew co-valedictorian. She won the school’s French Award, presented at the Consulate in New York, and addressed Baron Philippe de Rothschild in Paris, in French.

Taitz attended Barnard College, Columbia University, graduating summa cum laude with a bachelor's degree in English and psychology. She was inducted into Phi Beta Kappa in her junior year. Taitz was admitted to Yale Law School; she took a leave to go to Oxford University, where she studied the Romantics of the 19th century. These poets, along with Dickens and Eliot, became the basis of her M.Phil. degree in English Literature. Returning to Yale, Taitz obtained her J.D. and passed the New York State Bar.

== Career ==
=== Law ===
Taitz acted as a law guardian for foster children, working pro bono under the auspices of Lawyers for Children. She has also served as an advocate in the ER under the “DOVE” program at Columbia Presbyterian Hospital, supporting the legal rights of victims of rape and/or domestic violence.

=== Journalism ===
Taitz began her career in journalism as theatre critic for The New York Law Journal. She then wrote for 7 Days Magazine. These pieces led to her first book contract, for Mothering Heights, and to freelance work for The New York Times. There, she wrote extensively on the arts (particularly film and theatre), and contributed book reviews and personal essays. She was a contributing editor of Child Magazine, a New York Times publication, and The New York Observer assigned her a column on social/cultural issues. She currently writes for Psychology Today and The Huffington Post, as well as other publications.

=== Creative writing ===
Taitz began writing plays while at Oxford University. These were mounted on the stage at the Oxford Playhouse’s Burton-Taylor Rooms. During this time she was awarded the Sir Allan Bullock prize in a short fiction competition.

Other plays by Taitz have been staged in New York at Primary Stages, Women’s Interart Theatre, Circle Repertory, at the Ensemble Studio Theatre where Sonia Taitz served as Artist-in-Residence, as well as at Washington D.C’s National Theatre. Taitz was a three-time finalist at the Humana Festival of New American Plays.

Taitz’s first book was Mothering Heights (1992), a personal and sociological exploration of modern parenthood. The book, which advocated that parents choose their own way to raise their children, was excerpted in the Post for a week, featured on The Today Show, CBS This Morning, NPR, NBC, and CNN. It earned praise from People Magazine, Redbook, and Publishers Weekly.

Taitz’s next book, a novel titled In The King's Arms, received positive reviews by The New York Times Book Review and ForeWord Reviews, and Tait was highly praised by critic Jesse Kornbluth. The Jewish Book Council wrote positively about the novel in its quarterly journal, Jewish Book World and nominated it for the Sami Rohr Prize in Fiction. The Library of Congress funded an audiobook of In The King's Arms, to be taped at the Jewish Braille Institute in New York.

Taitz’s literary memoir, The Watchmaker's Daughter, was published in 2012. The book was listed in Vanity Fair’s “Fanfair/Hot Type” and was also listed as a Reader’s Digest “Must–Read”. It received positive reviews from People Magazine, Kirkus Reviews and was awarded a Book of the Year Medal from ForeWord Reviews. The Library of Congress funded the audio recording of The Watchmaker's Daughter, taped by the author at the Jewish Braille Institute, and completed in early 2014. The book was nominated for the American Library Association Sophie Brody Medal as a book that enhances the understanding of the Jewish-American experience. A radio play, "The Day Starts in the Night," based on an episode in the book, was commissioned and broadcast on NPR.

In 2014 Taitz’s fourth book, Down Under, was published by McWitty. It is a seriocomic novel about first love, forbidden liaisons and second chances.

== Personal life ==
Sonia Taitz is married and has three children, Emma, Gabriel, and Phoebe.

== Selected works ==
- Mothering Heights 1992, William Morrow hardcover; Berkley paper
- In The King's Arms
- The Watchmaker's Daughter 2012
- Down Under, McWhitty, 2014
