= Bulletproof glass =

Projectile-resistant transparent armor

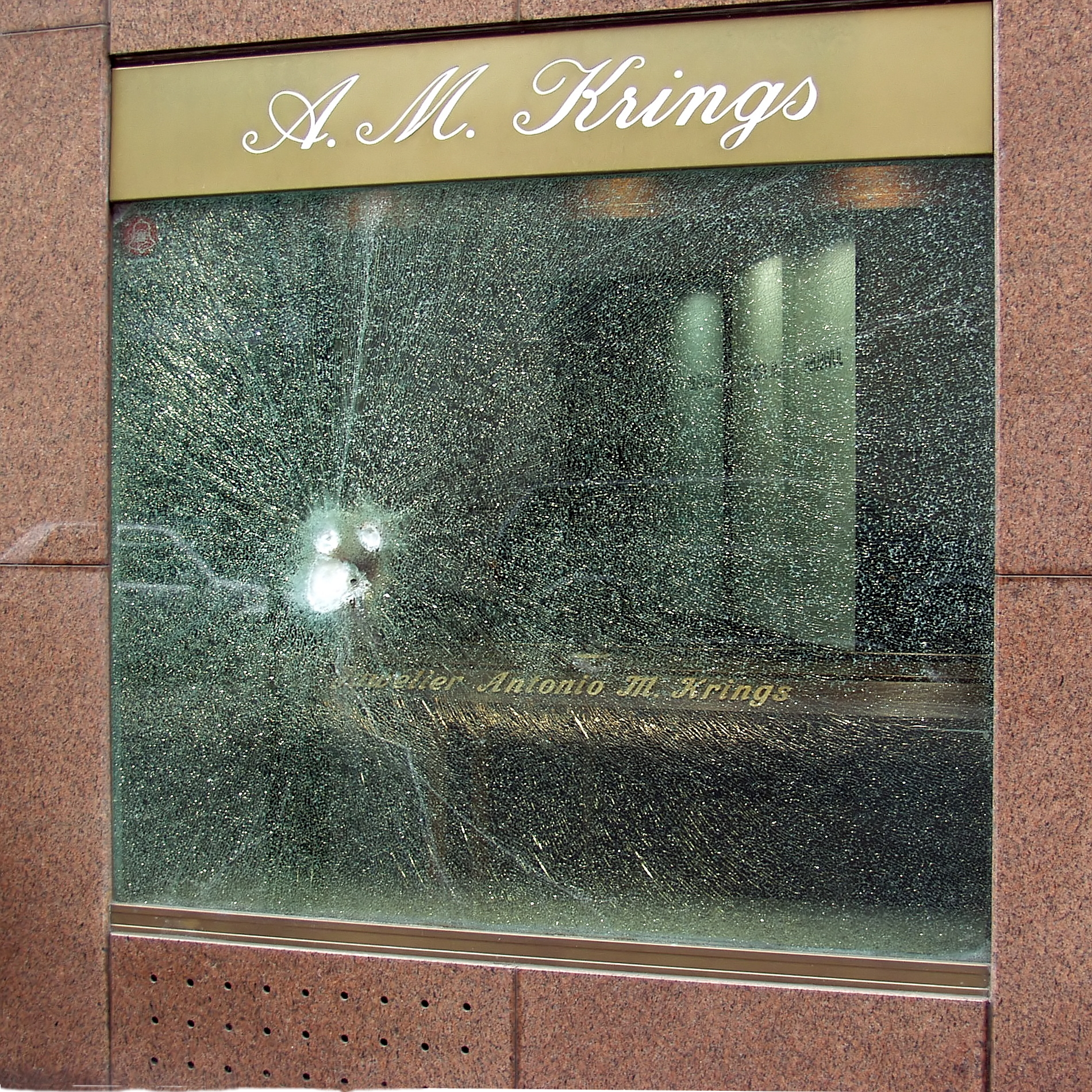
Bulletproof glass of a jeweler's window after a burglary attempt.

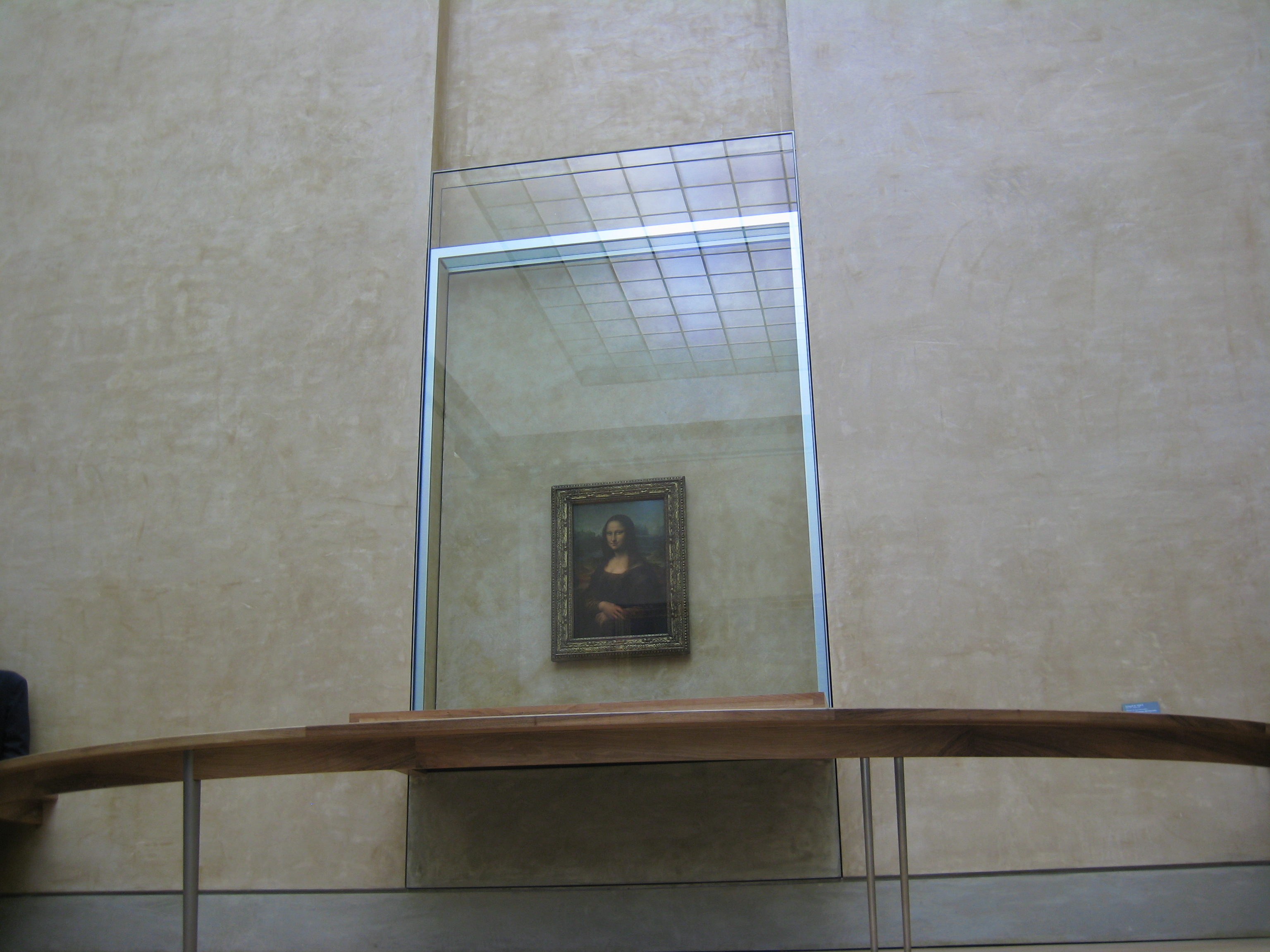
The Mona Lisa behind bulletproof glass at the Louvre Museum

Bulletproof glass, ballistic glass, transparent armor, or bullet-resistant glass is a strong and optically transparent material that is particularly resistant to penetration by projectiles, although, like any other material, it is not completely impenetrable. It is usually made from a combination of two or more types of glass, one hard and one soft. The softer layer makes the glass more elastic, so that it can flex instead of shatter. The index of refraction for all of the glasses used in the bulletproof layers must be almost the same to keep the glass transparent and allow a clear, undistorted view through the glass. Bulletproof glass varies in thickness from 3/4 to 3 1/2 inches (19 to 89 mm).

Bulletproof glass is used in windows of buildings that require such security, such as jewelry stores and embassies, and of military and private vehicles.

== Construction ==
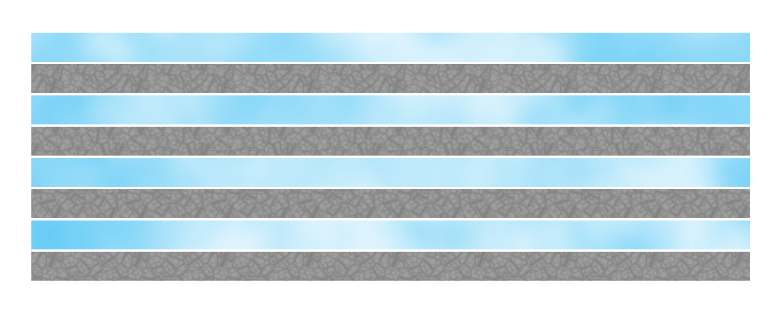
A rough visualisation of bulletproof glass, composed of layers of plastic sheeting (gray) and layers of glass (blue)

Bullet-resistant glass is constructed using layers of laminated glass. The more layers there are, the more protection the glass offers. When weight reduction is needed, polycarbonate (a thermoplastic) is laminated onto the safe side to stop spall. The aim is to make a material with the appearance and clarity of standard glass but with effective protection from small arms. Polycarbonate designs usually consist of products such as Armormax, Makroclear, Cyrolon: a soft coating that heals after being scratched (such as elastomeric carbon-based polymers) or a hard coating that prevents scratching (such as silicon-based polymers).

The plastic in laminate designs also provides resistance to impact from physical assault from blunt and sharp objects. The plastic provides little in the way of bullet resistance. The glass, which is much harder than plastic, flattens the bullet, and the plastic deforms, with the aim of absorbing the rest of the energy and preventing penetration. The ability of the polycarbonate layer to stop projectiles with varying energy is directly proportional to its thickness, and bulletproof glass of this design may be up to 3.5 inches (89 mm) thick.

Laminated glass layers are built from glass sheets bonded together with polyvinyl butyral, polyurethane, Sentryglas, or ethylene-vinyl acetate. When treated with chemical processes, the glass becomes much stronger. This design has been in regular use on combat vehicles since World War II. It is typically thick and usually extremely heavy. As noted above, laminated glass is usually backed with one or more polycarbonate layers to prevent spalling.

In the table below, you may note that UL 752 Level 6 is missing; this is because Level 6 is easier to resist than Level 4, so it has been left out to prevent confusion.

Sample thickness and weight for bullet-resistant glass materials
Protection Level	Example Threat Stopped	Glass Laminate				Polycarbonate				Acrylic				Glass-Clad Polycarbonate				Aluminum oxynitride			
Protection Level	Example Threat Stopped	Thickness		Weight		Thickness		Weight		Thickness		Weight		Thickness		Weight		Thickness		Weight	
Protection Level	Example Threat Stopped	in.	mm	lb/ft^{2}	kg_{F}/m^{2}	in.	mm	lb/ft^{2}	kg_{F}/m^{2}	in.	mm	lb/ft^{2}	kg_{F}/m^{2}	in.	mm	lb/ft^{2}	kg_{F}/m^{2}	in.	mm	lb/ft^{2}	kg_{F}/m^{2}
UL 752 Level 1	9mm HydraShok JHP +P+ 3 shots	1.185	30.09	15.25	74.46	0.75	19.05	4.6	22.46	1.25	31.75	7.7	37.6	0.875	22.225	6.06	29.59				
UL 752 Level 2	.357 Magnum 3 shots	1.4	35.56	17.94	87.6	1.03	26.16	6.4	31.25	1.375	34.92	8.5	41.50	1.0875	27.6225	9.33	45.55				
UL 752 Level 3 (approximately NIJ IIIA)	.44 Magnum 3 shots (5 shots for NIJ IIIa)	1.59	40.38	20.94	102.24	1.25	31.75	7.7	37.6					1.275	32.385	10.5	51.27				
UL 752 Level 4	.30-06 1 shot	1.125	28.575	11.68	57.03									1.338	35.25	14.43	69.47				
UL 752 Level 5	7.62 mm 1 shot	1.35	34.29	14.78	72.16																
UL 752 Level 7	5.56x45 5 shots	1.875	47.625	21.32	104.09																
UL 752 Level 8 (approximately NIJ III)	7.62 mm NATO 5 shots	2.275	57.785	26.51	129.43									2.374	60.3	26.01	126.99	0.95	24.11	18.25	89.10
UL 752 Level 9	.30-06 M2 AP 1 shot																				
UL 752 Level 10	.50 BMG 1 shot																	1.6	40.6	30.76	150.18

9mm 124gr at 1175-1293fps (1400-1530fps for Level 6), 357M 158gr at 1250-1375fps, 44M 240gr at 1350-1485fps, 30-06 180gr at 2540-2794fps, 5.56NATO 55gr at 3080-3388fps, 7.62NATO 150gr at 2750-3025fps. All ratings in the above chart are for copper-jacketed lead full metal jackets, except .44 magnum is a lead semi-wadcutter gas-check, and 30-06 is a lead-core soft-point.

== Test standards ==
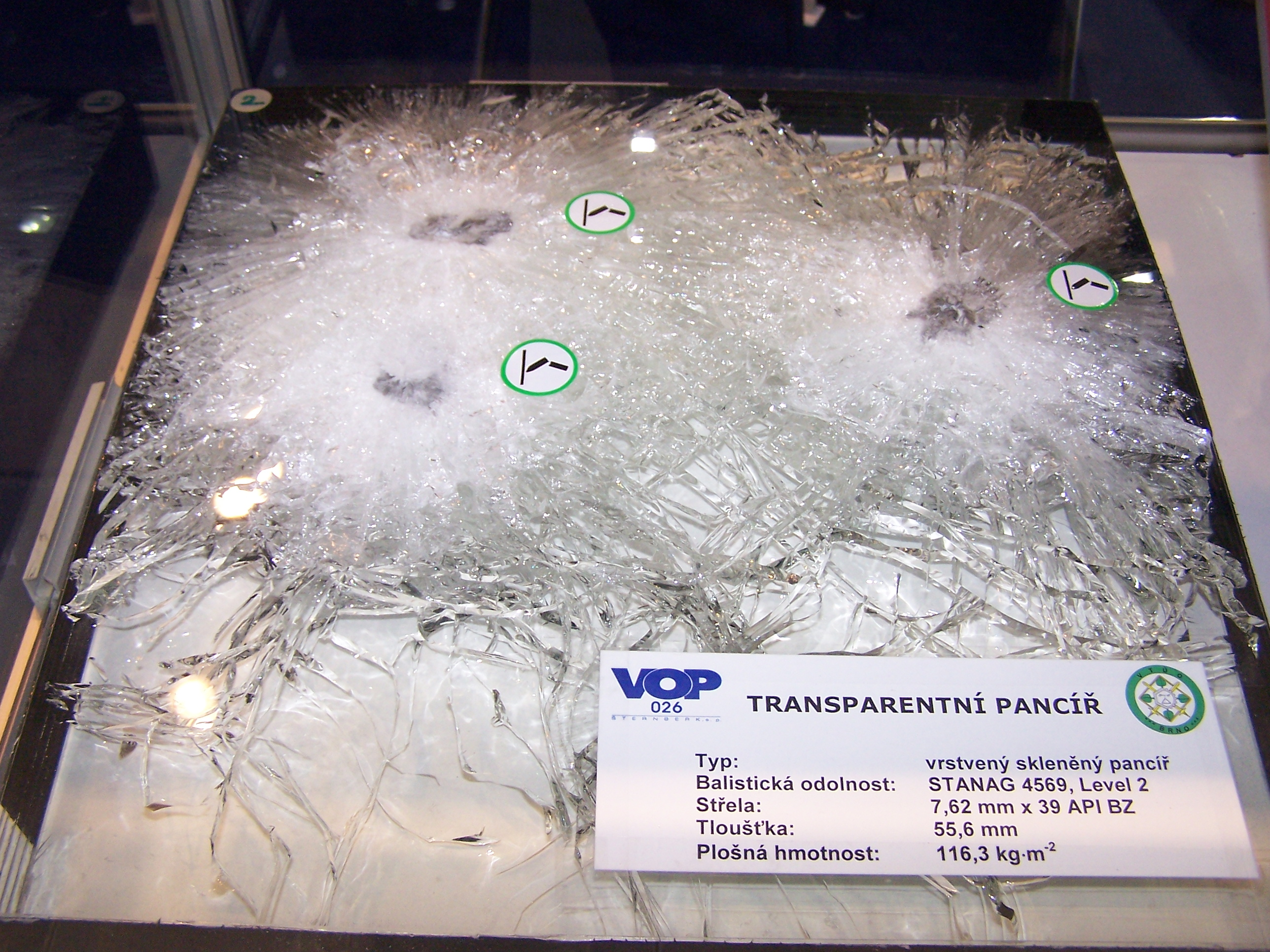
Ballistic test of a bullet-resistant glass panel

Bullet-resistant materials are tested using a gun to fire a projectile from a set distance into the material, in a specific pattern. Levels of protection are based on the ability of the target to stop a specific type of projectile traveling at a specific speed. Experiments suggest that polycarbonate fails at lower velocities with regular shaped projectiles compared to irregular ones (like fragments), meaning that testing with regular shaped projectiles gives a conservative estimate of its resistance. When projectiles do not penetrate, the depth of the dent left by the impact can be measured and related to the projectile’s velocity and thickness of the material. Some researchers have developed mathematical models based on results of this kind of testing to help them design bulletproof glass to resist specific anticipated threats.

== Environmental effects ==
The properties of bullet-resistant glass can be affected by temperature and by exposure to solvents or UV radiation, usually from sunlight. If the polycarbonate layer is below a glass layer, it has some protection from UV radiation due to the glass and bonding layer. Over time the polycarbonate becomes more brittle because it is an amorphous polymer (which is necessary for it to be transparent) that moves toward thermodynamic equilibrium.

An impact on polycarbonate by a projectile at temperatures below −7 °C sometimes creates spall, pieces of polycarbonate that are broken off and become projectiles themselves. Experiments have demonstrated that the size of the spall is related to the thickness of the laminate rather than the size of the projectile. The spall starts in surface flaws caused by bending of the inner, polycarbonate layer and the cracks move “backward” through to the impact surface. It has been suggested that a second inner layer of polycarbonate may effectively resist penetration by the spall.

== 2000s advances ==
In 2005, it was reported that U.S. military researchers were developing a class of transparent armor incorporating aluminum oxynitride (ALON) as the outside "strike plate" layer. Traditional glass/polymer was demonstrated by ALON's manufacturer to require 2.3 times more thickness than ALON to guard against a .50 BMG projectile. ALON is much lighter and performs much better than traditional glass/polymer laminates. Aluminum oxynitride "glass" can defeat threats like .50 caliber armor-piercing rounds using material that is not prohibitively heavy.

=== Spinel ceramics ===
Certain types of ceramics can also be used for transparent armor due to their properties of increased density and hardness when compared to traditional glass. These types of synthetic ceramic transparent armors can allow for thinner armor with equivalent stopping power to traditional laminated glass.

== See also ==
- Transparent Armor Gun Shield
- Prince Rupert's Drop
