= Telegiornale =

Telegiornale, or TG, may refer to:

- TG1, the Italian national newscasts on Rai 1
- TG2, the Italian national newscasts on Rai 2
- TG3, the Italian national newscasts on Rai 3
- TGR, the Italian regional newscasts on Rai 3
- TG4 (news program), the Italian national newscasts on Rete 4
- TG5, the Italian national newscasts on Canale 5
- TG La7, the Italian national newscasts on La7
- Telegiornale nazionale, the Swiss Italian-language national newscasts on La 1
- TGCOM, an Italian news website owned by Mediaset
