= Lowell House (publisher) =

Publishing company based in Los Angeles, California, US

Lowell House was a publishing company based in Los Angeles, California headed by Jack Artenstein. It was purchased in the late 1990s by the Chicago Tribune.
