= List of Majestic Prince episodes =

Majestic Prince
- Native name
- Kanji: マジェスティックプリンス
- Revised Hepburn: Majesutikku Purinsu
- No. of episodes: 24

Release
- Original network: Tokyo MX, tvk, KBS
- Original release: April 4 – September 19, 2013

Majestic Prince is an anime series adapted from the manga series of the same name written by Rando Ayamine and illustrated by Hikaru Niijima. Produced by Doga Kobo and Orange and directed by Keitaro Motonaga, the anime adaptation was announced in the November 2012 issue of Weekly Hero's magazine under the expanded title of Galactic Armored Fleet Majestic Prince (銀河機攻隊 マジェスティックプリンス, Ginga Kikōtai Majesutikku Purinsu). It was broadcast in Japan on Tokyo MX from April 4, 2013, to September 19, 2013. In July 2016 the episodes were rebroadcast, with a new "25th episode" on September 29, 2016, with events leading to a feature film released on November 4, 2016. The anime has been licensed by Sentai Filmworks and was streamed by Crunchyroll and the Anime Network.

The opening theme for episodes 2 through 12 is "Watashi wa Sōzō-suru" (私は想像する; "I Imagine") performed by Natsumi Kon. The ending theme for episodes 1 to 12 is "Sayonara tte Iu" (サヨナラっていう; "I'll Say Goodbye") performed by Chiaki Ishikawa. Ishikawa also wrote and composed both songs. The opening and ending themes change on episode 13 to "PROMPT", performed by Kon, and "Arigatō. Tadaima." (アリガトウ。タダイマ。; "Thank You. I'm Here.") performed by Yōko Hikasa and Yuka Iguchi as their characters Kei Kugimiya and Tamaki Irie, respectively. Episode 6 also features an insert song written by Ishikawa and performed by Kon titled "Kokoro" (ココロ; "Heart"). "Bokutachi wa Ikiteiru" (僕たちは生きている) by Izuru Hitachi (Hiroki Aiba), Toshikaze Asagi (Shintaro Asanuma), Ataru Suruga (Junya Ikeda) is the third ending, and runs in episode 16 and episodes 20–22. The second ending returns for episodes 13–15, 17-18 and 23. "Respect Me" by Chiaki Ishikawa is the ending for episode 19 and "Watashi wa Souzousuru" (私は想像する) by Natsumi Kon is the ending for episode 24.

== Episode list ==
| No. | Title | Directed by | Written by | Original release date |
|---|---|---|---|---|
| 1 | "Sortie"; Transliteration: "Shutsugeki" (Japanese: 出撃) | Keitaro Motonaga | Reiko Yoshida | April 4, 2013 |
Undina Base is under attack by an alien race called the Wulgaru. With the heavy losses suffered by the UPI, the evacuation of the base is ordered. Meanwhile, in a mock combat, the Military Junior Pre-Academy (MJP)'s Team Rabbits perform miserably as usual, getting the worst grades once again and regularly bickering among themselves. They are summoned into action, with new mecha powered by the JURIA system which is synched to their DNA, to hold off the Wulgaru forces while the Undina Base is being evacuated. When the UPI consider their mission accomplished, Rabbits team leader Izuru notices there are still civilians left on the base and with no vessels available to evacuate them, Izuru and the Rabbits fight off the Wulgaru fleet until the latter retreats.
| 2 | "Heroes Are Born"; Transliteration: "Hīrō Tanjō" (Japanese: ヒーロー誕生) | Makoto Sokuza | Reiko Yoshida | April 11, 2013 |
Team Rabbits receives recognition for protecting Undina Base including a new experience fielding questions at a press conference followed by some of the citizens thanking them. Their next mission is to install transmission satellites in space, but they also have to show off to their sponsors who have plastered their slogans all over their mecha. However, the Wulgaru launch a surprise attack, and Team Rabbits' mecha units are not prepared to defend them.
| 3 | "Surprise Attack"; Transliteration: "Kishū" (Japanese: 奇襲) | Yasuhiro Kuroda | Reiko Yoshida | April 18, 2013 |
Team Rabbits undergoes physical checkups and is given their next mission: to strike what is believed to be cargo ships on a Wulgaru supply route. Rin first mandates them to take down-time at a resort area, during which Izuru encounters a mysterious girl that seems familiar to him. However, at the mission, they discover the supply route is a reconnaissance squadron. The Vice Chief of Staff Komine orders them to attack the squad. Tamaki takes a beating.
| 4 | "Loss"; Transliteration: "Sōjitsu" (Japanese: 喪失) | Yorifusa Yamaguchi | Reiko Yoshida | April 25, 2013 |
As Team Rabbits try to fight off the squadron, Rin overrides Komine's intentions and orders a retreat. Izuru tries to protect Tamaki and Kei. Team Doberman arrives so that the Team Rabbits can return. Tensions grow taut as the pilots and crew brew over their last skirmish. Rin recalls the days when she first joined as a teacher for the academy.
| 5 | "Operation: Infiltrate a Planetoid Base"; Transliteration: "Shōwakusei Kichi Sennyū Sakusen" (Japanese: 小惑星基地潜入作戦) | Yoshifumi Sueda | Fumihiko Shimo | May 2, 2013 |
Team Rabbits and Team Doberman join forces in a covert operation to destroy an enemy base. However, the bomb is damaged during the infiltration and Ataru must work quickly to fix it while his companions risk their lives to protect him.
| 6 | "Graduation"; Transliteration: "Sotsugyō" (Japanese: 卒業) | Shinji Ushiro | Reiko Yoshida | May 9, 2013 |
Rin tells the five Rabbits members that they will be graduating early from the academy but that she will continue on to lead them. As the group pack their things to leave the school for good, they think about their time there. They also give a final demonstration in front of their classmates.
| 7 | "Stronghold of Lust"; Transliteration: "Yokubō no Gajō" (Japanese: 欲望の牙城) | Makoto Sokuza | Reiko Yoshida | May 16, 2013 |
The Wulgaru's main council discuss their plan for their next battle against Earth. The members of Team Rabbits start their lives as full-fledged members of the army, trying to get used with their new facilities and their corresponding pit crew co-workers. The Earth prepares for an attack on a base near Planet Ceres.
| 8 | "Battle of Ceres"; Transliteration: "Keresu Taisen" (Japanese: ケレス大戦) | Keitaro Motonaga | Takaaki Suzuki | May 23, 2013 |
The Battle of Ceres begins, and once again Commander Komine's ineptitude and arrogance puts the entire operation in jeopardy, having the Earth forces fall prey to the Wulgaru's relentless offensive. Teams Rabbits and Doberman are dispatched to assist in the counterattack, but Izuru is forced to leave his friends' side and confront Prince Jiart in a duel, struggling to hold himself against his overwhelming power.
| 9 | "Disclosure"; Transliteration: "Kaiji" (Japanese: 開示) | Yorifusa Yamaguchi | Fumihiko Shimo | May 30, 2013 |
Despite having the upper hand, the Wulgaru retreat, leaving heavy casualties on Earth's side. Izuru, in shock upon realizing the true nature of their enemies, is instructed by Rin to not reveal it to the others. Soon after, he has another encounter with the mysterious girl, and much to their surprise, Team Rabbits is informed that she is a Wulgaru who had warned mankind of the attack from their race, and their mecha were created using Wulgaru technology obtained from her.
| 10 | "The Hunter and the Hunted"; Transliteration: "Karumono, Kararerumono" (Japanese: 狩るもの、狩られるもの) | Yoshifumi Sueda | Fumihiko Shimo | June 6, 2013 |
Team Rabbits learn from Teoria that mankind is one among several races created by the Wulgaru to serve as their prey in order to strengthen their species. Meanwhile, news of their exploits reach the Wulgaru's main council who recognize the Earthlings as the first race so far who made such a stand against them and starts addressing them by their name instead of labeling them as mere game.
| 11 | "Operation: Ares"; Transliteration: "Operēshon Aresu" (Japanese: オペレーション・アレス) | Takanori Yano | Takaaki Suzuki | June 13, 2013 |
A Wulgaru ship has crashed in Mars and Team Rabbits is assigned to escort Teoria's aide Daneel while he infiltrates it to retrieve its data, while dealing with several issues against them, like the unfavourable weather, the remaining enemy forces stationed there and the ship's fast decaying.
| 12 | "Secret Mission"; Transliteration: "Shīkuretto Misshon" (Japanese: シークレットミッション) | Makoto Sokuza | Hiro Ito | June 20, 2013 |
Taking a break from battles, Team Rabbits has some free time to spend, except for Tamaki and Kei who take part in several PR events by request of the military.
| 12.5 | ""Special Edition: It won't end in Failure!!"; Transliteration: "Tokubetsuhen Zannen Nankade Owa Nai!!" (Japanese: 特別編「ザンネンなんかで終わんない!!」) | Unknown | Unknown | June 27, 2013 |
A special program is held featuring Kei's voice actor Yōko Hikasa and Tamaki's voice actor Yuka Iguchi, discussing their impressions from the first twelve episodes including their favorite scenes.
| 13 | "The Aloof Ace"; Transliteration: "Kokō no Ēsu" (Japanese: 孤高のエース) | Juria Matsumura | Reiko Yoshida | July 4, 2013 |
A new recruit, Ange Kuroki, joins the ranks of Team Rabbits. Shy at some moments and abrasive at others, Ange displays outstanding prowess in battle during their first mission together, but the rest of the team is rendered speechless while seeing Kuroki's true demeanor.
| 14 | "AHSMB's Shadow"; Transliteration: "Asshu no Kage" (Japanese: アッシュの影) | Yorifusa Yamaguchi | Fumihiko Shimo | July 11, 2013 |
Ange is invited to hang out with the rest of the team and they get astonished with the multiple talents of their new companion. After a brief meeting with Teoria, Izuru joins Team Rabbits in a mission to rescue Team Doberman's derelict ship. However, Jiart appears to resume his duel with Izuru, who pushes the capabilities of his unit to the limit with Teoria's words engraved into his heart.
| 15 | "Defending Vesta"; Transliteration: "Vesuta Bōei" (Japanese: ヴェスタ防衛) | Yoshifumi Sueda | Takaaki Suzuki | July 18, 2013 |
Following his clash with Jiart, Izuru awakens at the hospital, and his companions find that he is behaving differently from usual. With his unit severely damaged, Izuru must stay behind while the rest of Team Rabbits is dispatched to assist Team Doberman once more, but little they know that the Wulgaru's attack is just a distraction for one of them to gain access to the Earth's systems and obtain secret info regarding the MJP Project.
| 16 | "Your Hero"; Transliteration: "Kimi no Hīrō" (Japanese: 君のヒーロー) | Takanori Yano | Reiko Yoshida | July 25, 2013 |
Izuru is invited by Teoria for a dinner, but their meeting is cut short when a small enemy detachment slips by the defense lines intending to reach Earth.
| 17 | "Defensive Battle at Cosmopolitan Academy (Part 1)"; Transliteration: "Toshi Gakuen Bōei Sen (Mae Hen)" (Japanese: 都市学園防衛戦(前篇)) | Daisuke Eguchi | Fumihiko Shimo | August 1, 2013 |
Ange is sent to assist Team Doberman in the frontlines while the rest of Team Rabbits race against all odds to intercept the enemy forces before they reach the Academy. Meanwhile, Jiart realizes that Teoria, his sister, is on Earth under human custody.
| 18 | "Defensive Battle at Cosmopolitan Academy (Part 2)"; Transliteration: "Toshi Gakuen Bōei Sen (Kou Hen)" (Japanese: 都市学園防衛戦(後篇)) | Daisuke Eguchi | Fumihiko Shimo | August 8, 2013 |
After a long and exhausting battle, Team Rabbits succeed to defend the academy and defeat one of the Wulgaru's main commanders despite their units get damaged almost beyond repair. Meanwhile, Teoria hears from Daneel that Jiart had already learned that she is on Earth and is asking her to contact him. Back at the Wulgaru's base, another commander learns of Teoria's betrayal and Jiart resorts to extreme measures to silence him.
| 19 | "Deep Recon"; Transliteration: "Dīpu Rīkon" (Japanese: ディープリーコン) | Yorifusa Yamaguchi | Takaaki Suzuki | August 15, 2013 |
With Team Rabbits' units still under repairs, the pilots get some medical check-up, raising concerns about Izuru's condition. Meanwhile, Team Doberman is assigned to pinpoint the location of the Wulgaru's dimensional gate behind the enemy lines in a dangerous top secret mission that may turn into a one way trip for them.
| 20 | "Genes of Destiny"; Transliteration: "Shukumei no Idenshi" (Japanese: 宿命の遺伝子) | Juria Matsumura | Reiko Yoshida | August 22, 2013 |
As the members of Team Rabbits mourn the tragic fate of Team Doberman, Izuru's condition keeps worsening, while Teoria reveals herself before the Earth's top governments to ask for their support in a decisive battle against the Wulgaru. Asagi is asked by Izuru's pit crew to perform some tests on his unit, and manages to activate it, which was not supposed to be possible by anyone except Izuru himself. Pressuring Rin for answers, Asagi learns from her the secret behind the MJP project and the truth behind his and Izuru's origins.
| 21 | "Night before the Decisive Battle"; Transliteration: "Kessen Zenya" (Japanese: 決戦前夜) | Juria Matsumura | Reiko Yoshida | August 29, 2013 |
As both the Earth and Wulgaru forces make preparations for their final battle, Izuru refuses to stay behind despite his condition and is allowed to remain on standby at the Godinion. The other members of Team Rabbits then promise to do their best to ensure he does not need to sortie. Meanwhile, Teoria decides to join the battle as well, piloting her own unit to defend mankind against her own race.
| 22 | "Operation: Heaven's Gate"; Transliteration: "Operēshon Hevunzu Gēto" (Japanese: オペレーション・ヘヴンズ·ゲート) | Makoto Sokuza | Fumihiko Shimo | September 5, 2013 |
The members of Team Rabbits make a beeline to the Wulgaru's dimensional gate in an attempt to destroy it and stop the invasion, but another enemy commander stays in their way and Tamaki confronts her by herself to avenge her friend from Team Doberman. Once the enemy is defeated, all hope seems lost when their plan to bring down the gate ends in failure.
| 23 | "Alea Iacta Est"; Transliteration: "Ārea Yakuta Esuto" (Japanese: アーレア・ヤクタ・エスト) | Daisuke Eguchi | Takaaki Suzuki | September 12, 2013 |
Instead of waiting for Izuru, Jiart joins the battle and blocks Team Rabbits' escape route, forcing Izuru to sortie. The fierce clash between Izuru and Jiart is interrupted when Teoria reveals herself before the Wulgaru, asking them to retreat. After successive failed attempts in destroying the dimensional gate, Commander Simon decides to ram the Star Rose into it in a last desperate move to stop the invasion.
| 24 | "Flowers that Fall in Space"; Transliteration: "Uchū ni Chiru Hana" (Japanese: 宇宙に散る花) | Juria Matsumura | Reiko Yoshida | September 19, 2013 |
The Earth forces protect the Star Rose as it approaches the gate, forcing the Wulgaru to launch a desperate attack to stop it. Pushed to the limit against Jiart, Izuru is about to get his mind overcome by his instincts until his friends call for him, allowing him to wake up and unlock the true power of his mecha.
Bonus episode
| 25 | "Wings to the Future"; Transliteration: "Mirai e no Tsubasa" (Japanese: 未来への翼) | Unknown | Unknown | September 29, 2016 |
Team Fawn, consisting of four students from Gurantseere Academy, hopes to join Team Rabbits in the GDF. However, unlike their fellow cadets, they are chosen to stay behind during the execution of the operation to take down the Wulgaru warp gate, much to their dismay, unaware that there was a special reason for it.
