= List of GetBackers chapters =

Cover of the first GetBackers volume, comparing the original release (left) with Tokyopop's English version (right)

The chapters of the Japanese manga series GetBackers were written by Yuya Aoki and illustrated by Rando Ayamine. The series ran in Kodansha's shōnen manga magazine Weekly Shōnen Magazine from 1999 to 2007. The series follows the GetBackers, a team that recovers lost items. Its two main members are Ban Mido, who possesses 200 kg of force in his right hand and an illusion technique called the Evil Eye, and Ginji Amano, the former leader of the gang The VOLTS from the dangerous Infinity Fortress, who can control electricity.

The series is divided into twelve main story arcs called "Acts", along with a few side stories titled "Interludes". Kodansha collected its individual chapters in 39 tankōbon volumes, released from August 17, 1999, to April 17, 2007. An additional one-shot chapter was published in Magazine Special on February 20, 2009.

GetBackers was licensed for English release in North America by Tokyopop, who first announced the acquisition in the Anime Expo 2004 in July 2003. Tokyopop divided the manga in two parts: GetBackers featuring the first twenty-five and GetBackers: Infinity Fortress the following ones. The volumes were published from February 10, 2004, to July 7, 2008; only the first two volumes of Infinity Fortress were released. On August 31, 2009, Tokyopop announced that the rights to the series had expired.

== Volumes ==
=== GetBackers ===
| No. | Original release date | Original ISBN | English release date | English ISBN |
|---|---|---|---|---|
| 1 | August 17, 1999 | 4-06-312731-1 | February 10, 2004 | 978-1-59182-633-0 |
"Act I: Here Come the GetBackers! – Part 1: No Such Thing as a Free Lunch Date" (ACT. 1: 奪還屋登場! (1)) [Chapter 1]; "Act I: Here Come the GetBackers! – Part 2: His Daughter's Keepers" (ACT. 1: 奪還屋登場! (2)) [Chapter 2]; "Act I: Here Come the GetBackers! – Part 3: Undead Men Tell No Tales" (ACT. 1: 奪還屋登場! (3)) [Chapter 3]; "Act II: Get Back the Moment! – Part 1: Like a Bat Outta Heaven" (ACT. 2: 誓いの瞬間を奪り還せ! (1)) [Chapter 4]; "Act II: Get Back the Moment! – Part 2: A Cat Always Lands on its Face" (ACT. 2: 誓いの瞬間を奪り還せ! (2)) [Chapter 5]
Ban Mido and Ginji Amano, known as the GetBackers, are a retrieval duo hired by a homeless man to rescue his daughter, Rika, seized by the yakuza after his bankruptcy. Infiltrating the gang's hideout, they locate Rika, but she refuses to leave, resenting her father for abandoning her. When ambushed, Ban uses his "Evil Eye" to drive their attackers to suicide, allowing escape. They return to find the man mortally wounded by street assailants; Ban grants him a dying vision of reconciliation. Later, the GetBackers take a job from Kinue Akagawa to recover a stolen maneki-neko heirloom. They retrieve it but damage the statue, exposing a hidden disk. This draws the attention of Ryūdo "The Undead" Hishiki, a mercenary sent by Akagawa's employer, Dr. Kabutogawa, who attacks them to reclaim it.
| 2 | September 17, 1999 | 978-4-06-312741-6 | April 13, 2004 | 978-1-59182-634-7 |
"Act II: Get Back the Moment! (3)" (ACT. 2: 誓いの瞬間を奪り還せ! (3)) [Chapter 6]; "Act II: Get Back the Moment! (4)" (ACT. 2: 誓いの瞬間を奪り還せ! (4)) [Chapter 7]; "Act II: Get Back the Moment! (5)" (ACT. 2: 誓いの瞬間を奪り還せ! (5)) [Chapter 8]; "Act III: Givers and Takers (1)" [Chapter 9]; "Act III: Givers and Takers (2)" [Chapter 10]; "Act III: Givers and Takers (3)" [Chapter 11]; "Act III: Givers and Takers (4)" [Chapter 12]; "Act III: Givers and Takers (5)" [Chapter 13]
After being overpowered by Ryuudo "The Undead" Hishiki, the GetBackers and Hevn are captured by Dr. Kabutogawa, who seizes the hidden disk. Kinue Akagawa rescues them, revealing Kabutogawa's organ-trafficking ring – her fiancé among his victims. She had stolen the disk as evidence, but a corrupt reporter hid it in the maneki-neko before being silenced. The GetBackers storm Kabutogawa's clinic, defeating his hired guards. Hishiki, set ablaze, plunges into Tokyo Bay, while Kabutogawa is left catatonic from Ban's Evil Eye. Akagawa reunites with her comatose fiancé, and the police dismantle the operation. Later, Ban and Ginji visit the hospitalized couple; Ban gifts them a dream of their lost wedding before refunding half their payment for medical costs. Seeking new lodgings, they are tested by Paul, a proxy for politician Otaki, who hires them to retrieve a stolen box from rival transporters. After failing to intercept Gozo "No-Brakes" Maguruma, they battle his team – Kurodo "Dr. Jackal" Akabane and Himiko "Lady Poison" Kudo. Ginji is abducted, and Himiko reveals Ban killed her brother, Yamato. Ban retrieves both Ginji and the box, but the conflict leaves unresolved tensions.
| 3 | November 17, 1999 | 978-4-06-312777-5 | June 8, 2004 | 978-1-59182-635-4 |
"Act III: Givers and Takers – Part 6: Rematch" [Chapter 14]; "Act III: Givers and Takers – Part 7: Magnetic Attraction" [Chapter 15]; "Act III: Givers and Takers – Part 8: Life's Simple Pleasures" [Chapter 16]; "Act III: Givers and Takers – Part 9: Like a Millon Bucks" [Chapter 17]; "Act IV: Get Back The Sound of Life – Part 1: Music to my Ears" [Chapter 18]; "Act IV: Get Back The Sound of Life – Part 2: Play it Again, Gang" [Chapter 19]; "Act IV: Get Back The Sound of Life – Part 3: Music Shootes and the Savage Beast" [Chapter 20]; "Act IV: Get Back The Sound of Life – Part 4: A Better Mousetrap" [Chapter 21]
The transporters pursue Ban and Ginji, leading to another clash – Ban swiftly defeats Himiko after nearly revealing the truth about Yamato's death, while Ginji overpowers Akabane by magnetically extracting his embedded scalpels. Though Akabane withdraws, Himiko and Maguruma continue chasing them until Ban unleashes his Evil Eye on a murder of crows, driving them off. The GetBackers deliver the box, only to find it contains a worthless platinum melon, leaving them penniless once more. Their next job comes from violin prodigy Madoka Otowa, who hires them to recover her stolen Stradivarius from rival musician Shunsuke Akutsu, rumored to have mafia ties. Posing as musicians, the GetBackers and allies infiltrate Akutsu's mansion, but he sees through their ruse and sends Shido Fuyuki, Ginji's former comrade from the Infinity Fortress, to eliminate them. Shido attempts to have Ban devoured by a lion, but Ban uses his Evil Eye on the beast, turning it against Akutsu's men. As they regroup, Madoka goes missing, and Shido confronts Ban, seeking vengeance for Ginji's departure from their old gang, the Volts. He forces Ban to exhaust his Evil Eye, believing it renders him vulnerable. The battle spills outside, unresolved.
| 4 | January 17, 2000 | 978-4-06-312792-8 | August 10, 2004 | 978-1-59182-636-1 |
"Act IV: Get Back The Sound of Life – Part 5: When Animals Attack" [Chapter 22]; "Act IV: Get Back The Sound of Life – Part 6: Fast Getaway" [Chapter 23]; "Act IV: Get Back The Sound of Life – Part 7: Gone in 60 Seconds" [Chapter 24]; "Act IV: Get Back The Sound of Life – Part 8: My Brother's Reaper" [Chapter 25]; "Act IV: Get Back The Sound of Life – Part 9: The Ties that Bind" [Chapter 26]; "Act IV: Get Back The Sound of Life – Part 10: Best of Show" [Chapter 27]; "Act IV: Get Back The Sound of Life – Part 11: For the People" [Chapter 28]; "Act IV: Get Back The Sound of Life – Part 12: Behind the Music" [Chapter 29]
Ban battles Shido and his animals, proving his combat skills extend beyond the Evil Eye, but withdraws when Kazuki intervenes. Meanwhile, Ginji and Hevn locate Madoka, who confronts Akutsu – only for him to feign surrender before sending assassins after her. The group escapes with Madoka's butler, unaware he is secretly working for Akutsu. When the butler betrays them, Ban's Evil Eye reveals the "deaths" as an illusion. Three simultaneous duels unfold: Shido versus the elder Kurobe brother, Ban against the younger, and Ginji facing Hishiki. Madoka, inexplicably drawn to Shido, rushes to aid him, prompting Hevn to follow. Ban and Ginji emerge victorious, but Shido refuses their help, defeating Kurobe alone yet sparing him for Madoka's sake. Ginji invites Shido to join their team, but he declines. The mission seems thwarted when Shido's whistle sends Mozart fleeing with the violin. However, at Madoka's recital, Shido returns it, having severed ties with Akutsu. Madoka performs an impromptu street concert, her playing subtly reflecting newfound affection. Later, Shido moves into her home and starts a rival recovery service, much to Ban and Ginji's irritation.
| 5 | April 14, 2000 | 4-06-312829-6 | October 12, 2004 | 978-1-59182-637-8 |
"Act V: Phanthom Sunflower – Part 1: Art Van Gone" [Chapter 30]; "Act V: Phanthom Sunflower – Part 2: Clayman Cometh" [Chapter 31]; "Act V: Phanthom Sunflower – Part 3: Art Appreciation 101" [Chapter 32]; "Act V: Phanthom Sunflower – Part 4: Burn, Baby, Burn" [Chapter 33]; "Act V: Phanthom Sunflower – Part 5: The Art of Aty Fraud" [Chapter 34]; "Act V: Phanthom Sunflower – Part 6: The Curse of the Starving Class" [Chapter 35]; "Act VI: Return to Infinity Fortress – Part 1: Enter Akabane!" (ACT.6: 無限城"IL"奪還作戦! (1)) [Chapter 36]; "Act VI: Return to Infinity Fortress – Part 2: Volts Reunited" (ACT.6: 無限城"IL"奪還作戦! (2)) [Chapter 37]; "Act VI: Return to Infinity Fortress – Part 3: Kill and be Killed" (ACT.6: 無限城"IL"奪還作戦! (3)) [Chapter 38]
Hevn introduces clients from Takaokaya Department Store hiring the GetBackers and Shido to recover a supposed 13th Van Gogh's Sunflowers painting. Though skeptical of its authenticity, Ban accepts the high-paying job. The thief Clayman, secretly monitoring them, sets traps with Himiko's help. After being lured into a mirror maze that turns their powers against each other, the captured GetBackers awaken in Clayman's gallery. Clayman reveals the painting is genuine—containing Van Gogh's spirit—and offers them permanent employment retrieving stolen art. When Hachisu's disposers attack, the GetBackers switch sides to protect the paintings. Hachisu burns the gallery in an insurance fraud scheme, but the team escapes with the artworks, exposing his scam. In the aftermath, Clayman is revealed to be a woman whose medium mother channeled dead artists to create the "new" masterpieces. At Honky Tonk, Kazuki explains this supernatural origin before Hevn arrives with a new mission requiring former rivals to collaborate: retrieving a mysterious target called "I.L" from the Infinity Fortress. The assembled team enters the dangerous slum, where disguised attackers and poison gas separate them during combat.
| 6 | June 16, 2000 | 978-4-06-312849-9 | December 14, 2004 | 978-1-59182-638-5 |
"Act VI: Return to Infinity Fortress – Part 4: Strange Bedfellows" (ACT.6: 無限城"IL"奪還作戦! (4)) [Chapter 39]; "Act VI: Return to Infinity Fortress – Part 5: The Body Shop" (ACT.6: 無限城"IL"奪還作戦! (5)) [Chapter 40]; "Act VI: Return to Infinity Fortress – Part 6: For the Birds" (ACT.6: 無限城"IL"奪還作戦! (6)) [Chapter 41]; "Act VI: Return to Infinity Fortress – Part 7: Face Off" (ACT.6: 無限城"IL"奪還作戦! (7)) [Chapter 42]; "Act VI: Return to Infinity Fortress – Part 8: Strings Attached" (ACT.6: 無限城"IL"奪還作戦! (8)) [Chapter 43]; "Act VI: Return to Infinity Fortress – Part 9: Pins and Needles" (ACT.6: 無限城"IL"奪還作戦! (9)) [Chapter 44]; "Act VI: Return to Infinity Fortress – Part 10: Multiplicity" (ACT.6: 無限城"IL"奪還作戦! (10)) [Chapter 45]; "Act VI: Return to Infinity Fortress – Part 11: One Good Turn" (ACT.6: 無限城"IL"奪還作戦! (11)) [Chapter 46]
After being separated by poison gas, Ginji reluctantly teams up with Akabane, who saved him from unconsciousness, while Ban and Shido battle enhanced twin brothers—former Volts members now serving MakubeX, one of the Four Emperors, learning the Infinity Fortress has deteriorated since Ginji's departure; elsewhere, Himiko is ambushed by a Kazuki impostor until the real Kazuki intervenes, only for her to turn on him under MakubeX's wire-doll control, forcing Kazuki to fake his death in an explosion to escape Juubei Kakei, a former ally now working for MakubeX, who returns with an unconscious Himiko and imprisons her alongside the captured Hevn as MakubeX tests Ginji and Akabane with holographic duplicates and foot soldiers they ultimately overcome, while a gravely wounded Kazuki is rescued by a stranger and taken to pharmacist Gen, whom he later saves from local thugs before departing to confront MakubeX about the Fortress's decline.
| 7 | August 10, 2000 | 978-4-06-312874-1 | February 8, 2005 | 978-1-59182-969-0 |
"Act VI: Return to Infinity Fortress – Part 12: All Tied Up and Nowhere to Go!" (ACT.6: 無限城"IL"奪還作戦! (12)) [Chapter 47]; "Act VI: Return to Infinity Fortress – Part 13: The Fortress of Dolls!" (ACT.6: 無限城"IL"奪還作戦! (13)) [Chapter 48]; "Act VI: Return to Infinity Fortress – Part 14: When Bad Friends Attack!" (ACT.6: 無限城"IL"奪還作戦! (14)) [Chapter 49]; "Act VI: Return to Infinity Fortress – Part 15: Fight for your Right to Party!" (ACT.6: 無限城"IL"奪還作戦! (15)) [Chapter 50]; "Act VI: Return to Infinity Fortress – Part 16: Good Times Gone Bad!" (ACT.6: 無限城"IL"奪還作戦! (16)) [Chapter 51]; "Act VI: Return to Infinity Fortress – Part 17: Catching Up with Ginji!" (ACT.6: 無限城"IL"奪還作戦! (17)) [Chapter 52]; "Act VI: Return to Infinity Fortress – Part 18: May We Come In?" (ACT.6: 無限城"IL"奪還作戦! (18)) [Chapter 53]; "Act VI: Return to Infinity Fortress – Part 19: Ginji vs. Juubei!" (ACT.6: 無限城"IL"奪還作戦! (19)) [Chapter 54]; "Act VI: Return to Infinity Fortress – Part 20: Akabane vs. Kagami! (Work's Never Done)" (ACT.6: 無限城"IL"奪還作戦! (20)) [Chapter 55]
After escaping captivity, Himiko and Hevn search for I.L. near their prison while Ban tracks MakubeX to the underground garbage facility, where he and Shido are ambushed by wire-doll puppets and Fudou—Ban's vengeful former acquaintance seeking retribution for his lost arm; during their battle, Haruki Emishi intervenes, posing as an anti-MakubeX ally before betraying them in an illusionary ruse that collapses when Ban and Shido realize they never left the rooftop, allowing Emishi to retreat on MakubeX's orders. Meanwhile, Ban and Kazuki separately uncover that I.L. is an implosion lens for a nuclear weapon and suspect a traitor among their team, while Ginji and Akabane battle Juubei and Kagami before forcing their retreat and advancing toward the bomb component's location.
| 8 | November 16, 2000 | 978-4-06-312902-1 | April 12, 2005 | 978-1-59182-970-6 |
"Act VI: Return to Infinity Fortress – Part 21: Notes from the Underground!" [Chapter 56]; "Act VI: Return to Infinity Fortress – Part 22: One Step Closer!" [Chapter 57]; "Act VI: Return to Infinity Fortress – Part 23: The Final Countdown!" [Chapter 58]; "Act VI: Return to Infinity Fortress – Part 24: Reunited and It Feels so Good!" [Chapter 59]; "Act VI: Return to Infinity Fortress – Part 25: Behind Closed Doors!" [Chapter 60]; "Act VI: Return to Infinity Fortress – Part 26: Where Are We?" [Chapter 61]; "Act VI: Return to Infinity Fortress – Part 27: Meet the Beastmaster!" [Chapter 62]; "Act VI: Return to Infinity Fortress – Part 28: Room of Illusion!" [Chapter 63]; "Act VI: Return to Infinity Fortress – Part 29: Juubei's Secret Move!" [Chapter 64]
After being rescued from MakubeX's rollerblading minions and wire-doll children by Kazuki and later Ginji and Akabane, the recovery team reunites with Ban and Shido before encountering a six-door chamber where they roll a die to determine their paths—except Hevn who remains behind. Kazuki and Shido find themselves facing Emishi and Juubei in a shared illusory battlefield that transforms into the Grand Canyon, where Shido overpowers Emishi but spares him from a suicidal attack, while Kazuki confronts Juubei about his loyalty to MakubeX as their duel begins, with Shido escaping the virtual trap through his bat-like perception and taking Emishi to safety while mentioning Gen's potential help.
| 9 | January 17, 2001 | 978-4-06-312924-3 | June 7, 2005 | 978-1-59182-971-3 |
"Act VI: Return to Infinity Fortress – Part 30: Secrets Revealed" [Chapter 65]; "Act VI: Return to Infinity Fortress – Part 31: Rain of Needles" [Chapter 66]; "Act VI: Return to Infinity Fortress – Part 32: Faces of Betrayal" [Chapter 67]; "Act VI: Return to Infinity Fortress – Part 33: A New Reality" [Chapter 68]; "Act VI: Return to Infinity Fortress – Part 34: My Oh Mayan!" [Chapter 69]; "Act VI: Return to Infinity Fortress – Part 35: Welcome Back, Ban!" [Chapter 70]; "Act VI: Return to Infinity Fortress – Part 36: An Arm for an Arm" [Chapter 71]; "Act VI: Return to Infinity Fortress – Part 37: Lightning Strikes!" [Chapter 72]; "Act VI: Return to Infinity Fortress – Part 38: Lightning Strikes Twice!" [Chapter 73]
Juubei reveals MakubeX's plan to use the atomic bomb as leverage against Babylon City's god-like rulers, but Kazuki exposes the truth—MakubeX seeks to usurp divine judgment, not negotiate—leading Juubei to attempt suicide in remorse, though Kazuki saves him and takes him to Gen. Meanwhile, Akabane betrays the team, delivering plutonium to MakubeX before pursuing the I.L., while Himiko battles Kagami on a virtual Mayan pyramid until Ban's Evil Eye breaks the illusion, forcing Kagami's retreat. Concurrently, Ginji confronts phantom versions of his deceased childhood friends, manipulated by virtual Takeru into embracing his destructive Lightning Lord persona, whose unleashed power disrupts the entire Fortress's systems, including Ban's colosseum battlefield where he swiftly defeats Fudou to reach Ginji.
| 10 | March 16, 2001 | 978-4-06-312948-9 | July 12, 2005 | 978-1-59182-972-0 |
"Act VI: Return to Infinity Fortress – Part 39: Outta Control!" [Chapter 74]; "Act VI: Return to Infinity Fortress – Part 40: Ginji Heats Up!" [Chapter 75]; "Act VI: Return to Infinity Fortress – Part 41: Ginji Cools Down!" [Chapter 76]; "Act VI: Return to Infinity Fortress – Part 42: A Virtual Showndown!" [Chapter 77]; "Act VI: Return to Infinity Fortress – Part 43: Now, Go Ahead!" [Chapter 78]; "Act VI: Return to Infinity Fortress – Part 44: Face to Face!" [Chapter 79]; "Act VI: Return to Infinity Fortress – Part 45: In the Mind of Madness!" [Chapter 80]; "Act VI: Return to Infinity Fortress – Part 46: Life's a Dream!" [Chapter 81]
In his Lightning Lord state, Ginji brutally attacks Sakura Kakei until Akabane intervenes, eager to battle him at full power; Ban disrupts their fight by taking Akabane's sword through his shoulder, shocking Ginji back to normal while bluffing a third Evil Eye use to deceive MakubeX. As Akabane and Ginji proceed toward the I.L., Ban recovers only to be ambushed by the resilient Fudou before Shido arrives to duel him, allowing Ban and Hevn to rejoin the others. The teams face virtual replicas while Kazuki, despite injuries, rallies Emishi and Juubei to reason with MakubeX, culminating in a confrontation where Ginji initially struggles against MakubeX's control over their reality—until Ban's unseen Evil Eye manipulation is revealed to have fabricated MakubeX's victory, with the bomb's detonation and world's collapse being an illusion. Defeated, MakubeX attempts suicide but is stopped by Ginji and Juubei, ultimately accepting redemption through his friends' enduring bonds.
| 11 | May 17, 2001 | 978-4-06-312967-0 | August 9, 2005 | 978-1-59182-973-7 |
"Act VI: Return to Infinity Fortress – Part 47: Infinity's a Beginning!" [Chapter 82]; "Act VI: Return to Infinity Fortress – Part 48: Easy Come, Easy Go!" [Chapter 83]; "Interlude I: Operation: Retrieve the Retrieval Fee!" [Chapter 84]; "Interlude II: Shido & Madoka – Part 1: Dress-Up Shido!" [Chapter 85]; "Interlude II: Shido & Madoka – Part 2: Bug Off!" [Chapter 86]; "Interlude II: Shido & Madoka – Part 3: A Sticky Situation!" [Chapter 87]; "Interlude II: Shido & Madoka – Part 4: Save the Last Song" [Chapter 88]; "Act VII: The Lost Arms of the Goddess – Part 1: Clayman Returns!" [Chapter 89]; "Act VII: The Lost Arms of the Goddess – Part 2: The Pros and Cons of Hitchhiking!" [Chapter 90]
MakubeX surrenders the I.L. and dismantles the bomb, earning cheers from Infinity Fortress residents as he reforms VOLTS with Sakura, Juubei, and Emishi under Ginji's approval, though virtual-bound Ren cannot follow the departing team. Suspecting their clients' motives, Kazuki hesitates before Akabane massacres both the treacherous employers and their disposers, leaving the GetBackers with the accidentally destroyed I.L. and no payment. After failing get-rich-quick schemes to settle their Honky Tonk debt, Ban and Ginji interrupt Hevn's bath for work, only to be ejected—meanwhile, Shido thwarts a Mariudo assassination attempt and memory-wipes the attackers via Himiko before attending Madoka's recital, vowing to protect her. Later, Clayman reappears, hiring the duo to recover the Venus de Milo's arms from an Okinawan auction ship; after duping Emishi with Ban's Evil Eye, they evade capture but are ambushed by an unknown assailant, sparking Ban's unease about his past.
| 12 | August 10, 2001 | 978-4-06-313007-2 | November 8, 2005 | 978-1-59182-974-4 |
"Act VII: The Lost Arms of the Goddess – Part 3: All Aboard!" [Chapter 91]; "Act VII: The Lost Arms of the Goddess – Part 4: GetBackers Gettin' On!" [Chapter 92]; "Act VII: The Lost Arms of the Goddess – Part 5: Eating with the Enemy" [Chapter 93]; "Act VII: The Lost Arms of the Goddess – Part 6: The Party Begins!" [Chapter 94]; "Act VII: The Lost Arms of the Goddess – Part 7: Enjoy the Show!" [Chapter 95]; "Act VII: The Lost Arms of the Goddess – Part 8: Ban's Grand Entrance!" [Chapter 96]; "Act VII: The Lost Arms of the Goddess – Part 9: Approaching Shore" [Chapter 97]; "Act VII: The Lost Arms of the Goddess – Part 10: Welcome to Battleship Island!" [Chapter 98]; "Act VII: The Lost Arms of the Goddess – Part 11: Venus' Identity Exposed!" [Chapter 99]
Akabane ambushes Ban as a rival transporter of the Venus de Milo's arms, forcing their retreat while Shido and Emishi infiltrate the auction ship disguised as circus performers; Ginji boards but is manipulated by Yukihiko Miroku, whose siblings attack him after he refuses to abandon the mission, while Ban battles Natsuhiko Miroku—a former ally now seeking vengeance—before barely escaping. Meanwhile, Emishi defeats Liu Mengyan's martial artists for their crimes against Loulan women, and Akabane spares Ban upon learning of his past victory over the Lightning Lord, craving a future duel. Upon reaching Battleship Island, Ginji is captured as Yukihiko's hostage while Ban, Shido, and Emishi uncover Hevn's true mission: the "Venus" statue is a drug-smuggling front, its arms auctioned alongside the addictive Aphrodite narcotic, prompting their intervention to thwart the mafia's scheme.
| 13 | October 17, 2001 | 978-4-06-313030-0 | February 7, 2006 | 978-1-59182-975-1 |
"Act VII: The Lost Arms of the Goddess – Part 12: The Arms of the Enemy!" [Chapter 100]; "Act VII: The Lost Arms of the Goddess – Part 13: All Together, Now!" [Chapter 101]; "Act VII: The Lost Arms of the Goddess – Part 14: Killing Time!" [Chapter 102]; "Act VII: The Lost Arms of the Goddess – Part 15: Mighty Aphrodite!" [Chapter 103]; "Act VII: The Lost Arms of the Goddess – Part 16: The Auction Approaches!" [Chapter 104]; "Act VII: The Lost Arms of the Goddess – Part 17: Miroku's Secret!" [Chapter 105]; "Act VII: The Lost Arms of the Goddess – Part 18: Seven on One!" [Chapter 106]; "Act VII: The Lost Arms of the Goddess – Part 19: Ginji Cuts the Lights!" [Chapter 107]; "Act VII: The Lost Arms of the Goddess – Part 20: Ready to Roll!" [Chapter 108]
After Hela orders Ginji's execution out of bitterness toward Kaito's obsession with the Venus de Milo, he escapes and reunites with Ban, Shido, and Emishi in Battleship Island's tunnels—only to be ambushed due to Natsuhiko's tracker, forcing the group to split. While Shido and Emishi defeat Zhuolong and Binghu, Ginji struggles against the seven-in-one Miroku siblings until a mysterious candy's boost triggers his Lightning Lord transformation, allowing him to drain the island's electricity and overwhelm five siblings. Natsuhiko's attacks prove futile against Ginji's altered state, and even Yukihiko falls despite exploiting Ginji's confusion over his sudden reversion, enabling Ginji to flee and complete the mission.
| 14 | December 17, 2001 | 978-4-06-313052-2 | May 9, 2006 | 978-1-59182-976-8 |
"Act VII: The Lost Arms of the Goddess – Part 21: Hiding Trees in a Forest!" [Chapter 109]; "Act VII: The Lost Arms of the Goddess – Part 22: A Farewell to Arms" [Chapter 110]; "Act VII: The Lost Arms of the Goddess – Part 23: The Goddess Returns" [Chapter 111]; "Act VII: The Lost Arms of the Goddess – Part 24: Good Bye to Liu" [Chapter 112]; "Interlude III: Let's Go to the Hot Springs! – Part 1: Rock Hunting" [Chapter 113]; "Interlude III: Let's Go to the Hot Springs! – Part 2: Overwhelming Attack" [Chapter 114]; "Act VIII: Divine Design – Part 1: The More Things Change" (ACT. 8: 神の記述 (1)) [Chapter 115]; "Act VIII: Divine Design – Part 2: What's in the Cards?" (ACT. 8: 神の記述 (2)) [Chapter 116]; "Act VIII: Divine Design – Part 3: A New Deal Begins" (ACT. 8: 神の記述 (3)) [Chapter 117]
Using rubber decoys to fake his Evil Eye, Ban outmaneuvers Akabane and infiltrates the auction, where the team seizes both the Venus' arms and the drug-laden replica after trapping Liu's guards in illusions. Though Hela intercepts their escape, Shido summons a whale to ferry them away—only for Ginji to accidentally drop the artifacts into the ocean. Clayman pays half their fee, and the group reunites Hela with the catatonic Kaito, whose painting of her moves her to remorse; Ban then ensures Liu's arrest by haunting him with the Evil Eye, dismantling his empire. Yukihiko later warns Ginji of the Mirokus' vendetta against Ban for Eris' death, while the GetBackers' fleeting financial relief vanishes when Clayman bills them for the decoys. A subsequent hot springs job leads to a chance encounter with Kazuki and Juubei, where Kazuki reveals Gen's ties to the Infinity Fortress before monkeys force a chaotic jewelry recovery. Later, teamed with Kazuki, Himiko, and Hevn to investigate missing students linked to the suspicious Divine Design card game, the cram school's abrupt collapse hints at darker forces at play.
| 15 | March 15, 2002 | 978-4-06-313084-3 | August 8, 2006 | 978-1-59182-977-5 |
"Act VIII: Divine Design – Part 4: Namaste" (ACT. 8: 神の記述 (4)) [Chapter 118]; "Act VIII: Divine Design – Part 5: The Gaze of the Gorgon" (ACT. 8: 神の記述 (5)) [Chapter 119]; "Act VIII: Divine Design – Part 6: Akinetopsia" (ACT. 8: 神の記述 (6)) [Chapter 120]; "Act VIII: Divine Design – Part 7: Faith and Doubt" (ACT. 8: 神の記述 (7)) [Chapter 121]; "Act VIII: Divine Design – Part 8: Light-Bearer/Serpent-Bearer" (ACT. 8: 神の記述 (8)) [Chapter 122]; "Act VIII: Divine Design – Part 9: Unhappy Reunion" (ACT. 8: 神の記述 (9)) [Chapter 123]; "Act VIII: Divine Design – Part 10: Quiet as the Dew" (ACT. 8: 神の記述 (10)) [Chapter 124]; "Act VIII: Divine Design – Part 11: Buenas Noches!" (ACT. 8: 神の記述 (11)) [Chapter 125]; "Act VIII: Divine Design – Part 12: You Can't Bake a Cake" (ACT. 8: 神の記述 (12)) [Chapter 126]
At the Honky Tonk, Hevn links the Divine Design card game to mysterious deaths, prompting the team to infiltrate Tower Arts disguised as Indian artists—only to be trapped by the HR head, whose petrified corpse after Ban's card-induced dream forces their escape. While Ban and Himiko confront Lucifer, a witch-descended executive who demonstrates the cards' lethal reality-warping power, Ginji, Hevn, and Kazuki encounter Toshiki Uryu, Kazuki's former Fuga subordinate now serving Lucifer; Toshiki drags Kazuki into a card-based dimensional battle, leaving Ginji and Hevn to flee. Regrouping, Ban seeks Maria Noches, a witch mentored by his grandmother, who confirms the cards channel power from a higher reality and agrees to train them as Dominators capable of opposing Lucifer's supernatural threat.
| 16 | July 17, 2002 | 978-4-06-363124-1 | November 7, 2006 | 978-1-59182-978-2 |
"Act VIII: Divine Design – Part 13: In the Face of Danger" (ACT. 8: 神の記述 (13)) [Chapter 127]; "Act VIII: Divine Design – Part 14: The King's Blood" (ACT. 8: 神の記述 (14)) [Chapter 128]; "Act VIII: Divine Design – Part 15: Red String of Fate" (ACT. 8: 神の記述 (15)) [Chapter 129]; "Act VIII: Divine Design – Part 16: Puppet on a String" (ACT. 8: 神の記述 (16)) [Chapter 130]; "Act VIII: Divine Design – Part 17: Appointment with the Cursed Claw" (ACT. 8: 神の記述 (17)) [Chapter 131]; "Act VIII: Divine Design – Part 18: Thanatopsis" (ACT. 8: 神の記述 (18)) [Chapter 132]; "Act VIII: Divine Design – Part 19: Field of Lavender" (ACT. 8: 神の記述 (19)) [Chapter 133]; "Act VIII: Divine Design – Part 20: Trojan Horse" (ACT. 8: 神の記述 (20)) [Chapter 134]; "Act VIII: Divine Design – Part 21: Guardian of the West Gate" (ACT. 8: 神の記述 (21)) [Chapter 135]
Under Maria's tutelage, Ban's group masters Divine Design, becoming Dominators to combat Lucifer—though Ban rejects his witch lineage, focused solely on rescuing the children. As Juubei arrives seeking training to save Kazuki (now brainwashed under Uryu), the team splits: Hevn is captured at a graveyard after Kazuki ambushes her, while Ginji defeats Gabriel, learning of his sunset heart-ripping curse. Ban and Himiko overpower Sariel and Remiel, uncovering their tragic pasts exploited by Lucifer, before securing the cursed children with Paul. Meanwhile, Maria covertly sabotages Lucifer's forces using Hevn as a sleeper agent, prompting him to deploy the Four Holy Beasts as fortress guardians. Ban, Ginji, and Himiko breach the base, each defeating a guardian—with Ban's victory cementing his status as Lucifer's equal, to Maria's pride—and uncovering Lucifer's betrayal of the Witch Queen via his alliance with Brain Trust.
| 17 | September 17, 2002 | 978-4-06-363146-3 | February 13, 2007 | 978-1-59182-979-9 |
"Act VIII: Divine Design – Part 22: A Brother's Memory" (ACT. 8: 神の記述 (22)) [Chapter 136]; "Act VIII: Divine Design – Part 23: Twin Dragons" (ACT. 8: 神の記述 (23)) [Chapter 137]; "Act VIII: Divine Design – Part 24: The Rules of Reality" (ACT. 8: 神の記述 (24)) [Chapter 138]; "Act VIII: Divine Design – Part 25: For Longhua's Sake" (ACT. 8: 神の記述 (25)) [Chapter 139]; "Act VIII: Divine Design – Part 26: Devil's Gambit" (ACT. 8: 神の記述 (26)) [Chapter 140]; "Act VIII: Divine Design – Part 27: Divide and Conquer" (ACT. 8: 神の記述 (27)) [Chapter 141]; "Act VIII: Divine Design – Part 28: Dyed in Blood" (ACT. 8: 神の記述 (28)) [Chapter 142]; "Act VIII: Divine Design – Part 29: Illusions and Specters" (ACT. 8: 神の記述 (29)) [Chapter 143]; "Act VIII: Divine Design – Part 30: Coup de Gráce" (ACT. 8: 神の記述 (30)) [Chapter 144]
Ginji confronts Qinglong, whose pact with Lucifer promised reunion with his deceased sister—Ginji's past trigger for becoming the Lightning Lord—but refuses to kill him despite gaining the power through Maria's soul-card, rejecting vengeance as contrary to her wishes. Meanwhile, Himiko resists Suzaku's illusion of Yamato until his actual spirit intervenes, revealing Ban's innocence and hinting at her Voodoo Child destiny before vanishing. Juubei shatters the final guardian's seal after his training, enabling the team's advance, but they split again—Ban and Ginji face Toshiki and the possessed Kazuki (Orpheus), with Ban rendered intangible in Toshiki's domain. Ginji's refusal to fight Kazuki nearly proves fatal until Juubei intervenes, breaking the possession through self-sacrifice before battling Toshiki. Though Juubei sways Toshiki to defect, Lucifer's curse fatally claims his heart mid-redemption.
| 18 | November 15, 2002 | 978-4-06-363167-8 | May 8, 2007 | 978-1-59182-980-5 |
"Act VIII: Divine Design – Part 31: The Key" (ACT. 8: 神の記述 (31)) [Chapter 145]; "Act VIII: Divine Design – Part 32: The Wall" (ACT. 8: 神の記述 (32)) [Chapter 146]; "Act VIII: Divine Design – Part 33: Fortune's Hand" (ACT. 8: 神の記述 (33)) [Chapter 147]; "Act VIII: Divine Design – Part 34: Witch Blood" (ACT. 8: 神の記述 (34)) [Chapter 148]; "Act VIII: Divine Design – Part 35: Where They Belong" (ACT. 8: 神の記述 (35)) [Chapter 149]; "Act VIII: Divine Design – Part 36: Hole Card" (ACT. 8: 神の記述 (36)) [Chapter 150]; "Act IX: Marine Red – Part 1: Out of the Depths" [Chapter 151]; "Act IX: Marine Red – Part 2: On the Road Again" [Chapter 152]; "Act IX: Marine Red – Part 3: The Sting" [Chapter 153]
Sariel, disillusioned with Lucifer's manipulation, unlocks the path for Ban's group to confront him. During their battle, Ban uncovers Lucifer's true motive—to merge realities and reunite with his deceased daughter—and exposes the claw-mark curses as illusions meant to control his followers. Maria arrives with the freed children and Hevn, revealing Lucifer's inability to harm them; together, they perform a ritual to resurrect Toshiki, whose "death" was another illusion. The team returns the children to their families while Rena joins the Honky Tonk staff. Lucifer, seeking accountability from Brain Trust, is assassinated by Akabane to protect their secrets. Later, the GetBackers accept microbiologist Juuzou Ishikura's job to recover Marine Red—13 bottles of red wine stolen from a salvaged U-boat—tracking it to a yakuza transport guarded by Hishiki and Maguruma. After battling Hishiki and surviving a bee attack on Maguruma's truck, they discover the wine missing, realizing a third party has intercepted it, prompting their renewed pursuit.
| 19 | January 17, 2003 | 978-4-06-363191-3 | July 10, 2007 | 978-1-59182-981-2 |
"Act IX: Marine Red – Part 4: Insecticide" [Chapter 154]; "Act IX: Marine Red – Part 5: The Face of the Enemy" [Chapter 155]; "Act IX: Marine Red – Part 6: The Devil's Virus" [Chapter 156]; "Act IX: Marine Red – Part 7: Bee-Trayal" [Chapter 157]; "Act IX: Marine Red – Part 8: Battle for the Bottle" [Chapter 158]; "Act IX: Marine Red – Part 9: Immortal Bloodsucking Demon" [Chapter 159]; "Act IX: Marine Red – Part 10: The Brew that is True" [Chapter 160]; "Act IX: Marine Red – Part 11: Give to the Poor" [Chapter 161]; "Act X: The Eternal Bond – Part 1: On his Knees" [Chapter 162]
Tracking the stolen Marine Red, the GetBackers face Dokubachi, a Kiriudo assassin, who reveals one bottle contains a vampiric virus sought by his employer—the immortal Captain Blood, a WWII-era scientist who infected himself. After Ginji is poisoned during their escape, Ban strikes a deal with the betrayed Dokubachi: the antidote in exchange for defeating Blood. Ban overcomes Blood's regenerative biology, learning the virus was replaced with harmless wine by executed researcher Nadia Bartley. Though Ishikura reconciles with Blood, the GetBackers receive no payment—just a priceless (but now opened) bottle of wine. Later, Shido seeks protection for Madoka from Dokubachi's clan, recruiting Himiko and Akabane after Ban refuses.
| 20 | April 17, 2003 | 978-4-06-363225-5 | September 11, 2007 | 978-1-59182-982-9 |
"Act X: The Eternal Bond – Part 2: A Light in the Darkness" [Chapter 163]; "Act X: The Eternal Bond – Part 3: The Silence of the Butterflies" [Chapter 164]; "Act X: The Eternal Bond – Part 4: Kidnapped!" [Chapter 165]; "Act X: The Eternal Bond – Part 5: Reinforcements" [Chapter 166]; "Act X: The Eternal Bond – Part 6: The Proper Time" [Chapter 167]; "Act X: The Eternal Bond – Part 7: China Street" [Chapter 168]; "Act X: The Eternal Bond – Part 8: The Fearsome Tarantula Brothers" [Chapter 169]; "Act X: The Eternal Bond – Part 9: In the Spider's Nest" [Chapter 170]; "Act X: The Eternal Bond – Part 10: Fifty Percent" [Chapter 171]
After Madoka vanishes following her confession to Shido, he battles the Kiriudo—Saichō Mumyōin and his butterfly-wielding subordinates—until the GetBackers intervene, rescuing Madoka but prompting Shido to seek reinforcements from the dwindling Shiki clan. Meanwhile, Ban and Ginji capture Hakumon, a Kiriudo spy, who lures them to China Street's underground brothel run by Jorogumo, where Ginji is brainwashed via ear-spider into attacking Ban before being freed. Himiko, ambushed by Kirihito seeking vengeance, is briefly captured as a "gift" to Jorogumo until Ban liberates her, triggering a confrontation with Kirihito and new assassins Kagegumo and Tobigumo, while Onigumo replaces Kirihito as Ban's opponent.
| 21 | June 17, 2003 | 978-4-06-363250-7 | November 13, 2007 | 978-1-59182-983-6 |
"Act X: The Eternal Bond – Part 11 Why Do We Fight?" [Chapter 172]; "Act X: The Eternal Bond – Part 12 Karmic Burden" [Chapter 173]; "Act X: The Eternal Bond – Part 13 In the Spider's Lair" [Chapter 174]; "Act X: The Eternal Bond – Part 14 Say Goodbye to the Neighborhood" [Chapter 175]; "Act X: The Eternal Bond – Part 15 Out of Juice" [Chapter 176]; "Act X: The Eternal Bond – Part 16 Akabane-san Is Smiling" [Chapter 177]; "Act X: The Eternal Bond – Part 17 Cicadas!! Cicadaaas!!" [Chapter 178]; "Act X: The Eternal Bond – Part 18 Bailing Out" [Chapter 179]; "Act X: The Eternal Bond – Part 19 Invasion of the Puns" [Chapter 180]
Ginji defeats Kagegumo and Tobigumo non-lethally, questioning the war's purpose, while Ban tricks Onigumo into revealing Madoka's location at Web Tower—only for her "rescue" to be another trap. Jorogumo stabs Ginji, triggering a destructive Lightning Lord transformation that burns the Spider Clan's base but drains his powers, prompting Ban to exclude him. With Kazuki's intel, Ban and Himiko advance to Hell Valley as Akabane aids Ginji, repurposing his weakened electricity to detect invisible threats. At the valley, Miyama's beetle warriors capture Himiko for her insecticide scent's potential to break their curse, while Kanade attacks Ginji's helicopter—crashing it until Shiki clan member Kaoru Haruki intervenes. Meanwhile, Emishi bonds with comedian Amon Natsuki en route, unaware of the converging battles below.
| 22 | August 12, 2003 | 978-4-06-363270-5 | January 8, 2008 | 978-1-59182-984-3 |
"Act X: The Eternal Bond – Part 20 Trust All Your Cards" [Chapter 181]; "Act X: The Eternal Bond – Part 21 I'd Jump Out" [Chapter 182]; "Act X: The Eternal Bond – Part 22 The End of the Evil Eye" [Chapter 183]; "Act X: The Eternal Bond – Part 23 What Is Death?" [Chapter 184]; "Act X: The Eternal Bond – Part 24 Perfect Harmony" [Chapter 185]; "Act X: The Eternal Bond – Part 25 Life is Tenacity" [Chapter 186]; "Act X: The Eternal Bond – Part 26 Emishi's Strongest Asset" [Chapter 187]; "Act X: The Eternal Bond – Part 27 400 Cow-Sized Spiders" [Chapter 188]; "Act X: The Eternal Bond – Part 28 Why We Fight" [Chapter 189]
As Emishi teams with Amon—a Shiki member whose Grim Reaper-like powers drain life force—they battle mantis warriors while Ginji, recalling Teshimine's lesson on valuing "weak cards", resolves to fight despite his depleted abilities. Ban, tricked into believing Himiko betrayed him, feigns capture to infiltrate the Kiriudo, allied with Miyama and Kagami to overthrow Kabuto's parasitic reign. Meanwhile, Akabane survives Kanade's assault thanks to Juubei and Uryu's intervention, while Ginji's group decimates 400 transformed Kiriudo before Shido, Ryuho, and Kaoru arrive, healing the wounded and revealing Amon as the key to ending the centuries-old war—just as Masaki Kurusu watches from afar, lamenting Ginji's "fated" death.
| 23 | November 17, 2003 | 978-4-06-363308-5 | March 11, 2008 | 978-1-59182-985-0 |
"Act X: The Eternal Bond – Part 29 Welcome to Beast Palace" [Chapter 190]; "Act X: The Eternal Bond – Part 30 Ghost Ship" [Chapter 191]; "Act X: The Eternal Bond – Part 31 Die! Die! Die! Die!" [Chapter 192]; "Act X: The Eternal Bond – Part 32 The Well of Sadness" [Chapter 193]; "Act X: The Eternal Bond – Part 33 Death Is Somebody Else's Problem" [Chapter 194]; "Act X: The Eternal Bond – Part 34 The Babe Unborn vs. the Mud Men" [Chapter 195]; "Act X: The Eternal Bond – Part 35 The Future of the Kiriudo" [Chapter 196]; "Act X: The Eternal Bond – Part 36 Fighting Lessons" [Chapter 197]; "Act X: The Eternal Bond – Part 37 The Power of His Violence" [Chapter 198]
Akabane reengages Seminaru while Ginji presses onward, defeating Suiha Koyanagi of the Water Tribe by adapting his weakened electrical abilities into new techniques. Ban's group clashes with Ageha and Murasakimaru—Himiko triumphs but Genshu perishes shielding her—while Dokubachi abandons his fight against Ban. Observing these battles, Masaki Kurusu, the last VOLTS emperor, ominously foresees Ginji's impending death. Meanwhile, Shido unveils the clans' shared history: Kabuto's usurpation fractured their unity, and his current quest targets the ancient king's heart hidden within Amon. As Mumyoin assumes command of the faltering Kiriudo forces, the conflict nears its climax.
| 24 | February 17, 2004 | 978-4-06-363334-4 | May 8, 2008 | 978-1-59532-641-6 |
"Act X: The Eternal Bond – Part 38 Bridge of Fish" [Chapter 199]; "Act X: The Eternal Bond – Part 39 Reunions" [Chapter 200]; "Act X: The Eternal Bond – Part 40 Entering the Arena" [Chapter 201]; "Act X: The Eternal Bond – Part 41 Sacrificial Lambs" [Chapter 202]; "Act X: The Eternal Bond – Part 42 Stairway to Hell" [Chapter 203]; "Act X: The Eternal Bond – Part 43 I'll Only Need a Minute" [Chapter 204]; "Act X: The Eternal Bond – Part 44 The Traitor in Your Midst" [Chapter 205]; "Act X: The Eternal Bond – Part 45 My Final Gift" [Chapter 206]; "Act X: The Eternal Bond – Part 46 Tyrant of Chaos" [Chapter 207]
As Amon and Emishi join Shido's forces, the united Mariudo confront the Kiriudo's main army—though Jorogumo surrenders, recognizing Kabuto's manipulation. Mumyoin, still loyal, battles Ban and warns of Shido's impending betrayal. Kabuto paralyzes the group and commands Shido to incapacitate Ginji for possession; instead, Shido sacrifices himself to restore Ginji's powers. Channeling the Infinity Fortress' energy, Ginji becomes the Lightning Lord, driving Kabuto into Shido's corpse before purging him entirely through soul-targeting attacks, ending the ancient conflict at the cost of Shido's life.
| 25 | May 17, 2004 | 978-4-06-363369-6 | July 7, 2008 | 978-1-59532-642-3 |
"Act X: The Eternal Bond – Part 47 I Can't Help Laughing" [Chapter 208]; "Act X: The Eternal Bond – Part 48 I'm King Of The World" [Chapter 209]; "Act X: The Eternal Bond – Part 49 We Are a Happy Family" [Chapter 210]; "Act X: The Eternal Bond – Part 50 The Taste of Home" [Chapter 211]; "Act X: The Eternal Bond – Part 51 The Life of the God of Death" [Chapter 212]; "Act X: The Eternal Bond – Part 52 MakubeX's Game" [Chapter 213]; "Act X: The Eternal Bond – Part 53 Tag! You're It!" [Chapter 214]; "Act X: The Eternal Bond – Part 54 A Good Dream" [Chapter 215]; "Interlude IV: The Retriever's Second Anniversary" [Chapter 216]
Amon transfers the King Chimera's heart to Shido, reviving him while succumbing to his injuries. Ban utilizes his Evil Eye ability to force Kabuto to release the captive souls of Kiriudo warriors, ending the prolonged conflict. MakubeX observes how coordinated efforts altered the predicted outcome documented in Brain Trust's archives, which originally forecast Ginji's demise. A public tag competition is organized, serving the dual purpose of lifting Emishi's spirits through an illusionary encounter with Amon and obscuring activities from Babylon City observers. Later, Ban and Ginji assist Rena in recovering funds lost to fraudulent activities, demonstrating their continued operations as retrieval specialists.

=== GetBackers: Infinity Fortress ===
| No. | Original release date | Original ISBN | English release date | English ISBN |
|---|---|---|---|---|
| 26 | July 16, 2004 | 978-4-06-363397-9 | September 9, 2008 | 978-1-42781-508-8 |
Birth 1: Get Back the Final Piece! (Birth. 1, Bāsu Ichi) Part 1: Training Day (最後のピースを奪り還せ!①, Saigo no Pīsu o Torikaese! Ichi) [Chapter 217]; Birth 1: Get Back the Final Piece! – Part 2: The Left Hand of Revenge (最後のピースを奪り還せ!②, Saigo no Pīsu o Torikaese! Ni) [Chapter 218]; Birth 1: Get Back the Final Piece! – Part 3: Rat Blood (最後のピースを奪り還せ!③, Saigo no Pīsu o Torikaese! San) [Chapter 219]; Birth 1: Get Back the Final Piece! – Part 4: The Blank Second (最後のピースを奪り還せ!④, Saigo no Pīsu o Torikaese! Shi) [Chapter 220]; Birth 1: Get Back the Final Piece! – Part 5: The Locket (最後のピースを奪り還せ!⑤, Saigo no Pīsu o Torikaese! Go) [Chapter 221]; Birth 1: Get Back the Final Piece! – Part 6: Friday the 13th (最後のピースを奪り還せ!⑥, Saigo no Pīsu o Torikaese! Roku) [Chapter 222]; Birth 2: Operation: Retrieve the Genius Dog (Birth. 2, Bāsu Ni) Part 1: Two Girls, two Clients (天才犬奪還作戦!①, Tensai Ken Dakkan Sakusen! Ichi) [Chapter 223]
The story moves to the time Ban and Ginji became the Third Generation's GetBackers, and are hired by drug dealer Fox to extract a prisoner. With assistance from a female accomplice, they infiltrate the facility but encounter Takuma Fudou, a mercenary tasked with intercepting them. After Ginji engages Fudou in combat, Ban incapacitates him using the Evil Eye, allowing their escape. The target prisoner declines extraction, explaining his criminal past as a gangster involved with Yoko before losing his memory and starting a new life. The GetBackers relay this refusal to Fox, with Ban providing an illusory farewell through his ability. Later, Hevn offers them a job retrieving a dog, which they initially decline until approached directly by the owner, Natsumi Mitsuki.
| 27 | October 15, 2004 | 4-06-363358-6 | December 9, 2008 | 978-1-42781-509-5 |
Birth 2: Operation: Retrieve the Genius Dog! – Part 2 Lucky Tiger (天才犬奪還作戦! 2, Tensai Ken Dakkan Sakusen! Ni) [Chapter 224]; Birth 2: Operation: Retrieve the Genius Dog! – Part 3 Fermat's Last Theorem (天才犬奪還作戦!3, Tensai Ken Dakkan Sakusen! San) [Chapter 225]; Birth 2: Operation: Retrieve the Genius Dog! – Part 4 Superior Species (天才犬奪還作戦!4, Tensai Ken Dakkan Sakusen! Shi) [Chapter 226]; Birth 2: Operation: Retrieve the Genius Dog! – Part 5 The Final Evolution (天才犬奪還作戦!5, Tensai Ken Dakkan Sakusen! Go) [Chapter 227]; Birth 2: Operation: Retrieve the Genius Dog! – Part 6 The Cure (天才犬奪還作戦!6, Tensai Ken Dakkan Sakusen! Roku) [Chapter 228]; Act XI: Voodoo Child – Part 1 My Fair Lady [Chapter 229]; Act XI: Voodoo Child – Part 2 The Himiko Kudo in the Mirror [Chapter 230]; Act XI: Voodoo Child – Part 3 The Cursed Power of the Black Thread [Chapter 231]; Act XI: Voodoo Child – Part 4 Mandrake Voodoo Coffee [Chapter 232]
Ban, Ginji, and Natsuki travel to a television studio where Lucky, a highly intelligent dog, is featured on a program. During the retrieval, they are attacked by individuals mutated by an experimental virus. While Ban handles the infected assailants, Ginji battles Fudou once more. After subduing their opponents, they discover their former client orchestrated the attack, intending to use Lucky to advance his research on forced human evolution. Ban subjects him to the effects of the Evil Eye, triggering Lucky's mutation, but Ginji neutralizes the virus with his electrical abilities. The mission concludes successfully. Two years later, Akabane enlists their help in locating a woman identical in appearance to Himiko. Meanwhile, Kazuki confronts an opponent wielding enhanced strength through black threads, gaining information on the Ura Fuuchouin faction. Recognizing the threat of the Voodoo Curse upon Himiko, Ban and Ginji seek Maria's expertise to counteract it.
| 28 | January 17, 2005 | 978-4-06-363473-0 | Unreleased | 978-1-42781-510-1 |
Act XI: Voodoo Child – Part 5 [Chapter 233]; Act XI: Voodoo Child – Part 6 [Chapter 234]; Act XI: Voodoo Child – Part 7 [Chapter 235]; Act XI: Voodoo Child – Part 8 [Chapter 236]; Act XI: Voodoo Child – Part 9 [Chapter 237]; Act XI: Voodoo Child – Part 10 [Chapter 238]; Act XI: Voodoo Child – Part 11 [Chapter 239]; Act XI: Voodoo Child – Part 12 [Chapter 240]; Act XI: Voodoo Child – Part 13 [Chapter 241]
Akabane escorts Himiko to an underground arena overseen by Queen Himiko, her exact double. Ban explains to Ginji that the Voodoo Curse targets him as the Witch Queen's successor—a curse that previously manifested during Yamato Kudo's youth, creating a murderous doppelgänger. Though Ban eliminated the mirrored Yamato, the real Yamato perished as well. To prevent history from repeating, Ban intends to capture the mirrored Himiko. Meanwhile, Kazuki reforms his combat unit, Fuuga, reuniting with Juubei, Toshiki, Sakura, and Saizou to investigate the Ura Fuuchouin within the arena. Ban, Ginji, Himiko, Akabane, and Maria navigate hostile fighters before entering the competition.
| 29 | March 17, 2005 | 978-4-06-363498-3 | — | — |
Act XI: Voodoo Child – Part 14 [Chapter 242]; Act XI: Voodoo Child – Part 15 [Chapter 243]; Act XI: Voodoo Child – Part 16 [Chapter 244]; Act XI: Voodoo Child – Part 17 [Chapter 245]; Act XI: Voodoo Child – Part 18 [Chapter 246]; Act XI: Voodoo Child – Part 19 [Chapter 247]; Act XI: Voodoo Child – Part 20 [Chapter 248]; Act XI: Voodoo Child – Part 21 [Chapter 249]; Act XI: Voodoo Child – Part 22 [Chapter 250]
The GetBackers and Fuuga arrive at Inferno's Dome for the tournament to win Queen Himiko's hand. In their opening match, they face Der Henker, elite warriors from the Beltline—the Limitless Fortress' most lethal zone. Maria nearly falls to an opponent called "Help" until Ban intervenes, defeating Help but being disqualified and imprisoned for interference. Akabane swiftly eliminates his opponent while Himiko battles assassin Das Nichts. When Ginji prevents Himiko from executing Das Nichts, another competitor kills him instead. Learning Der Henker murdered his childhood friends in the Limitless Fortress, Ginji transforms into the Lightning Lord. MakubeX detects Beltline leader Der Kaiser attempting to siphon Ginji's power and counters by deploying a virus to sever the Fortress' energy flow, forcibly ending the transformation. With Der Henker's leader neutralized, Team GetBackers advances while Fuuga prepares to battle the Ura Fuuchouin faction.
| 30 | May 17, 2005 | 978-4-06-363524-9 | — | — |
Act XI: Voodoo Child – Part 23 [Chapter 251]; Act XI: Voodoo Child – Part 24 [Chapter 252]; Rest. 5 (Interlude V): Take an Oath 1 [Chapter 253]; Rest. 5 (Interlude V): Take an Oath 2 [Chapter 254]; Rest. 5 (Interlude V): Take an Oath 3 [Chapter 255]; Act XII: Get Back the Lost Time – Part 1 [Chapter 256]; Act XII: Get Back the Lost Time – Part 2 [Chapter 257]; Act XII: Get Back the Lost Time – Part 3 [Chapter 258]; Act XII: Get Back the Lost Time – Part 4 [Chapter 259]
The Fuuga members achieve swift victories against the Ura Fuuchouin, only to fall under Saizou's mental control. Saizou and Kagami are exposed as Brain Trust operatives collaborating with the Ura Fuuchouin faction. Kagami abducts Himiko, intending to use both her and Queen Himiko to break a powerful spell cast by the Witch Queen. Der Kaiser confronts Ban, revealing their familial connection and his history as part of the original GetBackers alongside Paul. He extends an invitation to enter the Fortress to rescue Himiko. Teshimine discloses that Ginji's mother resides in Babylon City, the highest level of the Fortress. Ban and Ginji proceed into the Fortress, with MakubeX guiding them to the dangerous Beltline sector while taking a separate route with Emishi. Concurrently, Shido allies with Kazuki to liberate the mind-controlled Fuuga members, while Akabane transports Hevn into the Fortress for unspecified purposes.
| 31 | July 15, 2005 | 978-4-06-363550-8 | — | — |
Act XII: Get Back the Lost Time (5) [Chapter 260]; Act XII: Get Back the Lost Time (6) [Chapter 261]; Act XII: Get Back the Lost Time (7) [Chapter 262]; Act XII: Get Back the Lost Time (8) [Chapter 263]; Act XII: Get Back the Lost Time (9) [Chapter 264]; Act XII: Get Back the Lost Time (10) [Chapter 265]; Act XII: Get Back the Lost Time (11) [Chapter 266]; Act XII: Get Back the Lost Time (12) [Chapter 267]; Act XII: Get Back the Lost Time (13) [Chapter 268]
Ban and Ginji face an assault by Dark Fuuchouin operatives Maiya and Yuri before being aided by Paul Wan. Meanwhile, Kazuki and Shido receive assistance from Ren in locating Beltline's entrance, with Kazuki unveiling his stigma-enhanced ocular abilities during combat. Paul instructs the GetBackers in advanced techniques while fending off Der Kaiser's elite forces, including Shimon, until Ban and Ginji intervene, forcing a retreat. Elsewhere, MakubeX and Emishi encounter the Miroku Seven en route to reunite with their father. Shido and Kazuki confront Masaki Kurusu, now exposed as a Brain Trust operative serving the Voodoo King. After overpowering them, Masaki identifies Shido as one of three essential "Keys" required for his faction's objectives.
| 32 | October 17, 2005 | 978-4-06-363584-3 | — | — |
Act XII: Get Back the Lost Time (14) [Chapter 269]; Act XII: Get Back the Lost Time (15) [Chapter 270]; Act XII: Get Back the Lost Time (16) [Chapter 271]; Act XII: Get Back the Lost Time (17) [Chapter 272]; Act XII: Get Back the Lost Time (18) [Chapter 273]; Act XII: Get Back the Lost Time (19) [Chapter 274]; Act XII: Get Back the Lost Time (20) [Chapter 275]; Act XII: Get Back the Lost Time (21) [Chapter 276]; Act XII: Get Back the Lost Time (22) [Chapter 277]
Yohan Kokuchouin, leader of the Ura Fuuchouin, intervenes to rescue Kazuki and Ren while fueling Kazuki's desire for vengeance, as Kagami reveals to Himiko her true nature as a Voodoo Child—a resurrected witch heir destined to merge with her counterpart upon turning seventeen. During Shido's attempted escape after defeating Kaoru and Jouya, the Voodoo King captures him, while Ban and Ginji face Saizou-controlled Juubei, Uryu and Sakura during their Beltline journey until MakubeX and Emishi arrive to assist, with MakubeX freeing Sakura from manipulation. Ginji's rage at confronting Juubei triggers a catastrophic Lightning Lord transformation that begins consuming his body, prompting Ban to fully unleash Asclepius' power—first defeating Uryu before enduring Ginji's berserk assault until his consciousness returns, even as the Infinity Fortress' energy threatens to overwhelm them both.
| 33 | December 16, 2005 | 978-4-06-363608-6 | — | — |
Act XII: Get Back the Lost Time (23) [Chapter 278]; Act XII: Get Back the Lost Time (24) [Chapter 279]; Act XII: Get Back the Lost Time (25) [Chapter 280]; Act XII: Get Back the Lost Time (26) [Chapter 281]; Act XII: Get Back the Lost Time (27) [Chapter 282]; Act XII: Get Back the Lost Time (28) [Chapter 283]; Act XII: Get Back the Lost Time (29) [Chapter 284]; Act XII: Get Back the Lost Time (30) [Chapter 285]; Act XII: Get Back the Lost Time (31) [Chapter 286]
During Saizou's attempt to execute Emishi, Kazuki engages him in battle, overcoming the Ura Fuuchouin's Cursed Wave technique through strategic use of his stigma ability. Following Kazuki's victory, the lingering spirits of Juubei, Uryu and Sakura expose Saizou's forced servitude under Yohan Kokuchouin and his manipulation of Fuuga as sacrificial pawns against Yohan, leading to Saizou's self-sacrifice to liberate the remaining Fuuga members who then join the advance toward Beltline. Ban, Ginji, MakubeX and Kazuki proceed to Beltline while their allies hold position against enemy forces at the entrance, where Emishi is rescued by Mariudo operatives alongside the mysteriously resurrected Amon. Upon reaching Beltline, the group successfully repels Maiya and Yuri's second assault before advancing to Der Kaiser's stronghold, encountering the arriving Miroku Seven who have come to aid their father Shimon, while Maria confronts Der Kaiser about his ambitions to seize control of Babylon City and harness the Infinity Fortress' full power.
| 34 | February 17, 2006 | 978-4-06-363628-4 | — | — |
Act XII: Get Back the Lost Time (32) [Chapter 287]; Act XII: Get Back the Lost Time (33) [Chapter 288]; Act XII: Get Back the Lost Time (34) [Chapter 289]; Act XII: Get Back the Lost Time (35) [Chapter 290]; Act XII: Get Back the Lost Time (36) [Chapter 291]; Act XII: Get Back the Lost Time (37) [Chapter 292]; Act XII: Get Back the Lost Time (38) [Chapter 293]; Act XII: Get Back the Lost Time (39) [Chapter 294]; Act XII: Get Back the Lost Time (40) [Chapter 295]
Teshimine allies with Kagenuma Sarai against the Voodoo King while Ban's group, now including Hevn, Paul and Akabane, reaches Der Kaiser's fortress where Paul demonstrates advanced combat techniques against Der Kaiser's forces before engaging his former partner directly. As their battle draws power from the Infinity Fortress, Der Kaiser gains the upper hand until Ban intervenes, facing the materialized Miroku Seven who block his path—quickly defeating most siblings while emulating Paul's fighting style. Natsuhiko Miroku confronts Ban seeking vengeance for his sister Eris, revealed to have been manipulated by the Voodooists to assassinate Ban, before being overcome and replaced by Yukihiko as the final challenger, with Der Kaiser and Paul's climactic struggle continuing alongside these developments.
| 35 | May 17, 2006 | 978-4-06-363667-3 | — | — |
Act XII: Get Back the Lost Time (41) [Chapter 296]; Act XII: Get Back the Lost Time (42) [Chapter 297]; Act XII: Get Back the Lost Time (43) [Chapter 298]; Act XII: Get Back the Lost Time (44) [Chapter 299]; Act XII: Get Back the Lost Time (45) [Chapter 300]; Act XII: Get Back the Lost Time (46) [Chapter 301]; Act XII: Get Back the Lost Time (47) [Chapter 302]; Act XII: Get Back the Lost Time (48) [Chapter 303]; Act XII: Get Back the Lost Time (49) [Chapter 304]; Act XII: Get Back the Lost Time (50) [Chapter 305]
Ginji relieves Ban to face Yukihiko, defeating him through refined techniques rather than the Lightning Lord transformation, while Ban confronts Der Kaiser in a battle fueled by Asclepius' power—with Ban ultimately overcoming his bloodline curse, prompting Der Kaiser to reveal his prior death against the Voodoo King and his lingering presence to safeguard one of Babylon's Keys, which he transfers to Ban before vanishing with his forces. Meanwhile, MakubeX departs to challenge the Archive (Infinity Fortress' god), Akabane escorts Hevn to Masaki, and the group splits—some searching for MakubeX, Shido, and Himiko, while Kazuki and Juubei engage Yohan's forces, confronting Maiya and Yuri during their advance.
| 36 | August 17, 2006 | 978-4-06-363706-9 | — | — |
Act XII: Get Back the Lost Time (51) [Chapter 306]; Act XII: Get Back the Lost Time (52) [Chapter 307]; Act XII: Get Back the Lost Time (53) [Chapter 308]; Act XII: Get Back the Lost Time (54) [Chapter 309]; Act XII: Get Back the Lost Time (55) [Chapter 310]; Act XII: Get Back the Lost Time (56) [Chapter 311]; Act XII: Get Back the Lost Time (57) [Chapter 312]; Act XII: Get Back the Lost Time (58) [Chapter 313]; Act XII: Get Back the Lost Time (59) [Chapter 314]; Act XII: Get Back the Lost Time (60) [Chapter 315]
Kazuki and Juubei defeat Maiya and Yuri, only to face Shigen Kusanosuke and the Fuuchouin's 13 Strings, with Juubei emerging victorious against Kusanosuke after a fierce duel observed by MakubeX through the Archive—Infinity Fortress' governing AI. When Kazuki confronts Yohan, who swiftly incapacitates Juubei, the shocking revelation surfaces that Yohan is Kazuki's younger brother, abandoned by the Fuuchouin due to his stigma-marked birth and raised by the Kokuchouin. Though initially shaken, Kazuki—aided by Juubei—resolves to honor Yohan's wish for death, executing their mother's ultimate technique to deliver the fatal blow while MakubeX continues interfacing with the Archive's systems to monitor these events unfolding across the fortress.
| 37 | November 17, 2006 | 978-4-06-363743-4 | — | — |
Act XII: Get Back the Lost Time (61) [Chapter 316]; Act XII: Get Back the Lost Time (62) [Chapter 317]; Act XII: Get Back the Lost Time (63) [Chapter 318]; Act XII: Get Back the Lost Time (64) [Chapter 319]; Act XII: Get Back the Lost Time (65) [Chapter 320]; Act XII: Get Back the Lost Time (66) [Chapter 321]; Act XII: Get Back the Lost Time (67) [Chapter 322]; Act XII: Get Back the Lost Time (68) [Chapter 323]; Act XII: Get Back the Lost Time (69) [Chapter 324]; Act XII: Get Back the Lost Time (70) [Chapter 325]
Kazuki's execution of his mother's technique reveals Yohan never murdered their parents—they chose death over accepting him—and facilitates Yohan's spiritual reunion with the forgiven clan souls, dissolving his stigma. Simultaneously, Masaki confronts Akabane until the latter departs after delivering Hevn, prompting Kanou and Kaoru to attack her until Ban intervenes—defeating Kanou while Ginji pursues Masaki. Kanou discloses Masaki's opposition to the Voodoo King and Kagami, fearing Babylon City's world-altering potential, as Masaki attempts to kill Ginji to prevent interference; though Ginji transforms into the Lightning Lord, Kaoru halts the battle by intercepting his attack, surviving due to MakubeX's intervention while Hevn persuades Masaki to stand down, culminating in their reconciliation as conflicts deescalate across the fortress.
| 38 | March 16, 2007 | 978-4-06-363787-8 | — | — |
Act XII: Get Back the Lost Time (71) [Chapter 326]; Act XII: Get Back the Lost Time (72) [Chapter 327]; Act XII: Get Back the Lost Time (73) [Chapter 328]; Act XII: Get Back the Lost Time (74) [Chapter 329]; Act XII: Get Back the Lost Time (75) [Chapter 330]; Act XII: Get Back the Lost Time (76) [Chapter 331]; Act XII: Get Back the Lost Time (77) [Chapter 332]; Act XII: Get Back the Lost Time (78) [Chapter 333]; Act XII: Get Back the Lost Time (79) [Chapter 334]; Act XII: Get Back the Lost Time (80) [Chapter 335]
Masaki exposes Brain Trust as a collective of specialists who constructed the Infinity Fortress to reshape reality, prompting Ban, Ginji, Paul and Maria to confront them while leaving Hevn with Masaki. Kagami forcibly merges Himiko with her counterpart, extracting her soul as a key for Babylon City's gate and triggering Kagenuma's transformation into the Voodoo King, who overpowers Teshimine and steals Shido's key. The GetBackers intercept Kagami, with Ban defeating him before Akabane executes him under Professor Makube's orders, while Der Kaiser's key revives Himiko. Ginji's Lightning Lord manifestation clashes with the Voodoo King until both alter-egos vanish, concluding that conflict but necessitating Ginji's duel against Ban to determine Babylon City's access rights as the final threshold before the Fortress' core.
| 39 | April 17, 2007 | 978-4-06-363814-1 | — | — |
Act XII: Get Back the Lost Time (81) [Chapter 336]; Act XII: Get Back the Lost Time (82) [Chapter 337]; Act XII: Get Back the Lost Time (83) [Chapter 338]; Act XII: Get Back the Lost Time (84) [Chapter 339]; Act XII: Get Back the Lost Time (85) [Chapter 340]; Act XII: Get Back the Lost Time (86) [Chapter 341]; Act XII: Get Back the Lost Time (87) [Chapter 342]; Act XII: Get Back the Lost Time (88) [Chapter 343]; Act XII: Get Back the Lost Time (89) [Chapter 344]
Ban's duel with Ginji is revealed as an Evil Eye illusion, with Ban conceding after Ginji refuses to fight, allowing him to reach Babylon City—a parallel Shinjuku where he meets his mother Dr. Amano and learns of Brain Trust's original plan to create a world for her deceased child, later corrupted by rogue members. Ginji rejects the power to alter reality and returns to his world, where Akabane preserves Ban's life after their climactic duel. The reunited GetBackers resume work at Paul's cafe, accepting their next assignment to retrieve Ban's mother.
