= List of One Week Friends episodes =

- Cover of the third Blu-ray volume released by Square Enix in Japan on August 20, 2014, featuring (left to right) Kaori Fujimiya, Saki Yamagishi, Yuki Hase and Shogo Kiryu.
- No. of episodes: 12

Release
- Original network: Tokyo MX
- Original release: April 6 – June 22, 2014

One Week Friends is a 2014 romantic comedy Japanese anime series based on the manga series written by Matcha Hazuki and serialized in Square Enix's Gangan Joker magazine. One day, high school sophomore Yuki Hase happens to notice that his classmate, Kaori Fujimiya always seems to spend much of her time all by herself. Mustering up his courage, Yuki approaches Kaori and attempts to befriend her which she reluctantly allows. However, after the pair share many meaningful and fun conversations, Kaori denies her friendship with Yuki, stating that she loses the memories of any friends she makes each week. Despite this, the story follows Yuki and his determination to become Kaori's friend over and over again as the weeks go by.

The anime is produced by Brain's Base and directed by Tarou Iwasaki, with script writing by Shōtarō Suga, character designs by Eri Yamazaki and soundtrack music by Nobuko Toda. The series premiered on Tokyo MX on April 6, 2014, and ran for twelve episodes until June 22, 2014, with later airings on MBS, TVA, AT-X and BS11. The series was picked up by Crunchyroll for online simulcast streaming in North America and other select parts of the world. Square Enix began releasing the series in Japan on Blu-ray and DVD volumes starting on June 18, 2014. The anime was licensed by Sentai Filmworks for distribution via select digital outlets and a home media release in North America. This was followed by its acquisition by Madman Entertainment for Australian distribution.

The opening theme is "Niji no Kakera" (虹のかけら; lit. 'A Piece of the Rainbow') by Natsumi Kon. The ending theme is a cover of Sukima Switch's 2004 single, "Kanade" (奏(かなで); lit. Melody) by Kaori Fujimiya (Sora Amamiya).

== Episode list ==
No.	Official English title (Note: All English titles are taken from Crunchyroll.) Original Japanese title	Original release date (Note: As One Week Friends premiered in Tokyo MX's Sunday 24:00 (12:00 a.m. JST) time slot, the episodes technically aired the days following the ones listed.)	Refs.
1	"The Start of a Friendship."; Transliteration: "Tomodachi no Hajimari." (Japanese: 友達のはじまり。)	April 6, 2014	
On Monday, Kaori Fujimiya rejects Yuki Hase's proposal of friendship. Feeling disheartened, Yuki's friend Shogo Kiryu advises him to ask Kaori for the reason that they can't be friends. However, when he tries doing so, Kaori feigns illness and avoids him. On Tuesday, Yuki goes to the rooftop and sits down to lunch with Kaori, where she explicitly says that she cannot have any friends. Not giving up, Yuki compromises that they have lunch the next day as acquaintances only. On Wednesday, Yuki is held back by a meeting regarding his math results and is forced to arrive late to the rooftop. To his surprise, Kaori waited for his arrival before eating her own lunch. The two talk about the things they do with friends and after school. After having lunch on Thursday, Kaori excitedly shows Yuki a flyer for a crêperie but stops herself, declaring that they aren't friends. As they continue their discussion, Yuki asks for Kaori's view on friendship. Finally, as Friday arrives, Kaori tearfully explains to Yuki that she loses the memories of people she gets close to every Monday, leaving the latter in confusion and sheer disbelief. Unsure of how to interpret Kaori's explanation, on Saturday, Yuki asks for Shogo's advice and he encourages Yuki to pursue Kaori. On Monday, Yuki approaches Kaori in class and heartbreakingly understands truth of her words when she looks at him with an indifferent and irritated expression, signifying her loss of memory. However, Yuki chooses to believe that Kaori wants a friend but hides behind a façade as a coping mechanism against being hurt from her amnesia. Thus, Yuki once again asks her to be friends.
2	"How to Spend Time with Friends."; Transliteration: "Tomodachi to no Sugoshikata." (Japanese: 友達との過ごし方。)	April 13, 2014	
Kaori immediately rejects Yuki's seemingly intrusive proposal, knocking the latter into a disheartened state once more. However Yuki picks himself up with encouragement from Shogo. The next day Yuki surprises Kaori on the rooftop and explains their lunchtimes from last week which Kaori happily believes. The following day, Yuki suggests that Kaori keep a diary to help her remember the time they spend together, and she begins documenting all the good and bad traits of Yuki's personality. On Friday Kaori presents Yuki with the crêpe flyer and he suggests that they visit the place after school. Kaori, shy of being seen together after school suggests meeting on Sunday instead. However, when they meet up, the crêperie turns out to be closed and Yuki suggests that they go to a karaoke place instead. After a fun-filled Sunday afternoon, they return home on the train, discussing how they will meet on the following Monday. A teary-eyed Kaori gets off her stop, asking Yuki to tell her all about today on Monday. That night Kaori creates a large notice on her bedroom door, reminding her friendship with Yuki and to read the diary for more details. At lunch on Monday, Kaori timidly meets with Yuki on the roof for the first time yet again and tearfully forces herself to remember him with her diary. Noticing that Kaori hasn't remembered anything from the diary, Yuki apologizes for his selfishness for her to remember him and how it caused her unnecessary pain. To Yuki's dismay, Kaori records Yuki's unfair and self-centred nature within her diary. However, Kaori also writes down his attentiveness to her and his sincere apology, acknowledging him as a wonderful person. Yuki asks Kaori to be his friend and the cycle repeats once more.
3	"Friends of Friends."; Transliteration: "Tomodachi no Tomodachi." (Japanese: 友達の友達。)	April 20, 2014	
Kaori begins making lunches for Yuki and records what he likes to eat. Afterwards Yuki suggests that they let Shogo in on her secret for an outside perspective. The following day Yuki has Shogo join them for lunch and his harsh demeanor slightly intimidates Kaori. However Shogo seems to understand when Yuki begins to explain Kaori's memory loss and even provides theories on how it may have originated, despite his skepticism which creates a small rift between him and Yuki when the latter defends Kaori. The next day after school, Kaori forgets the diary under her desk and finds herself scared to retrieve it in front of the other students, especially when two girls bring her to tears with their trash talk of her. However Shogo retrieves the diary for Kaori and explains that people won't understand her if she doesn't speak to them herself. The following Monday, Yuki runs after Kaori when she rushes out of class after a Math problem suddenly causes her to remember the eggs she made for lunch the week before. Shogo also follows them and since Kaori does remember him in the same manner as her family, deduces she doesn't consider them friends and ends up believing her story—with Yuki more optimistic than ever about Kaori's progress.
4	"Fighting with Friends."; Transliteration: "Tomodachi to no Kenka." (Japanese: 友達とのけんか。)	April 27, 2014	
A rumor begins spreading around the class that Kaori and Shogo are friends. Finding himself a bit envious, Yuki upsets Kaori by asking her to tone down on inquiries about Shogo. However his words hit Kaori harder than expected, resulting in their first fight to which she leaves school early that Friday. Kaori eventually finds herself at the river where she accidentally loses her diary, while at the same time Yuki goes to Kiryu for solace. Kaori then collapses from a cold when she returns home, coincidentally knocking the reminder about her diary off her door. The following Tuesday, Kaori finally shows up for school and Yuki immediately attempts to apologize for their fight. However much to his shock, she fails to remember him or her diary. Feeling depressed, Yuki asks for Shogo's advice and his words encourage Yuki to begin searching for Kaori's lost diary. Afterwards Shogo speaks with Kaori and helps her realize that her memories are missing. The next day, Kaori visits the river on a whim and finds Yuki desperately searching for the thing she forgot. When Yuki eventually finds the diary, Kaori accepts that it was the important thing she had lost. Finally, the pair make up and restart their cycle all over again.
5	"New Friends."; Transliteration: "Atarashii Tomodachi." (Japanese: 新しい友達。)	May 4, 2014	
Saki Yamagishi approaches Kaori on the roof and explains her wish for them to be friends. Kaori doesn't refuse the offer and instead tells Saki about her no-talking rule. The next day, Saki forgets the rule and attempts to interact with Kaori during the day. Despite finding Saki rather bold though, Yuki encourages Kaori to befriend her. Afterwards Kaori reveals her condition to Saki, with the latter likening it to her own casual forgetfulness, suggesting instead that Kaori not worry too much on it and the pair officially become friends. After school on Friday, Saki invites Kaori on a friendly date and they do much of the things that Kaori always wished to do with a friend, much to the envy of Yuki, who also drags Shogo along to observe them. At the day's end, Saki tells Kaori about how she used to be bullied but overcame her ordeal thanks to her friends; consequently bringing Kaori to tears when she acknowledges their true friendship. The following Monday, Kaori does indeed forget Saki. However when Saki begins prompting her memory, Kaori seems to recall a bit of their time together and enjoys their interaction, especially when joined by two of Saki's friends, Maiko Serizawa and Ai Nishimura. Finally Kaori turns and smiles at Yuki, as some of her memories slowly seem to be returning.
6	"Mothers of Friends."; Transliteration: "Tomodachi no Hahaoya." (Japanese: 友達の母親。)	May 11, 2014	
Yuki's teacher Jun Inoue, passes his test answers around the class as punishment for failing the recent math test. This forces Yuki to seek math tutelage from Kaori, who happily agrees and takes him, Shogo and Saki over to her house that evening to study. At Kaori's house the group meets her cheerful mother Shiho Fujimiya after which they settle down to work, with Yuki and Saki making slow progress. After some time, they procrastinate a bit when Kaori has trouble interacting with Shogo due to his intimidating demeanor, with Saki and Yuki trying to help the pair become closer. However in the end, the pair acknowledge each other as friends since they already hang out together. The next day Shiho asks Yuki to meet her at the park after school where she elaborates on Kaori's mental condition. Shiho explains that Kaori was hospitalized after being involved in a car accident and despite having no brain damage, she seemed to have repressed the memories of her friends after the accident for some reason. The next day, Yuki passes his test and talks to Kaori in class for the first time, making her happy. Seeing Kaori smile, Yuki resolves to continue becoming her friend over and over again as the weeks roll by.
7	"Friends of "Ah" / Friends of Whew"; Transliteration: "'Hoo' no tomodachi. / 'Fuu' no tomodachi." (Japanese: 「ほっ」の友達。/ 「ふぅ」の友達。)	May 18, 2014	
During Physical Education, Maiko and Ai begin asking Kaori about her relationship with Yuki and find them to be a really cute couple. Since they had been spending less time together in recent days, Yuki asks Kaori to tutor him for their final math exam and insist that they be alone. As they begin their tutoring after school, Yuki asks Kaori about her fascination with Math and inadvertently calls her cute during their talk. Afterwards Saki shows up with a class announcement from Mr. Inoue and Yuki helps her put it up. However as Maiko and Ai come to retrieve Saki, Kaori says "Ah" when they leave, much to her and Yuki's confusion. As Summer break draws near Yuki begins worrying about not being able to see Kaori as often and finds himself reluctant to talk to her about it. However Shogo convinces him that he should ask Kaori to meet up over the break and physically nudges Yuki out of his reluctance. Yuki eventually asks Kaori to make plans to meet up over the break and learns that she had just assumed they would still see each other. When Summer break begins the next Monday, Yuki and Kaori fail to plan a location to rendezvous and end up meeting on the school roof. Much to their surprise though, Kaori finally begins remembering exactly who Yuki is.
8	"The Beach with Friends."; Transliteration: "Tomodachi to Umi." (Japanese: 友達と海。)	May 25, 2014	
As Summer progresses, Kaori asks Yuki to visit the beach along with Saki and Shogo. Unfortunately when the four of them arrive at the beach the next morning, the weather takes a turn for the worse. While they try to make the most of some beach activities, the weather eventually forces them to take refuge in an arcade. Yuki then tries and fails to show off in the crane game after which the group takes some photos in a photo booth. When the weather finally clears around noon Shogo and Kaori are paired up to buy lunch, much to Yuki's disappointment. Shogo uses the opportunity to question Kaori on her feelings for Yuki, while Saki also teases Yuki on his feelings for Kaori. However Kaori notes to Shogo of experiencing unfamiliar feelings when she had seen Yuki speaking to other girls. Sometime later, as the day turns to evening, Shogo suggests that Yuki try harder to get Kaori to see his feelings. Afterwards Yuki and Kaori take a walk on the beach and share a tender moment. Finally, as the day draws to a close, the four friends enjoy some fireworks and while Kaori recalls the day's events, she has trouble describing her newfound feelings which had started surfacing. Meanwhile, a teenager and his family move back into the city.
9	"Last Day with Friends."; Transliteration: "Tomodachi to no Saishū-bi." (Japanese: 友達との最終日。)	June 1, 2014	
On the very last day of Summer break, Yuki, Kaori, Shogo and Saki get together at Kaori's house to complete their homework assignments. As the day progresses, Shiho explains the positive impact Yuki's friendship has had on Kaori's life and Shogo reaffirms to Yuki on the importance of the process in helping Kaori through her condition. Afterwards, Saki decides to head home despite not finishing her assignments and Shogo lends her his completed answer sheet which triggers a memory from their elementary school where he had also done this for her in the past. After Yuki finally finishes his assignments, he inquires about Kaori's gradually improving memories to which she positively regards their friendship as being the cause. The second semester begins the next day and Inoue refreshes the class's assigned seating which results in Kaori and Yuki seated next to each other. Afterwards Inoue introduces a transfer student named Hajime Kujo, who finds a seat next to Kaori and upon noticing her, harshly brands her as a traitor for breaking their "promise." This causes Kaori to collapse from sudden mental stress and when she finally awakens in the nurse's office, her memories of Yuki are completely reset once more.
10	"Friends and Friends."; Transliteration: "Tomodachi to Tomodachi." (Japanese: 友達とトモダチ。)	June 8, 2014	
On Monday, Yuki finds himself frustrated that all the progress he made with Kaori became undone with the appearance of Hajime, who sheds light on his elementary school attendance and hatred towards Kaori. During the following day's lunch, Yuki bursts into tears after the realization that the Kaori he had become friends with isn't there anymore. That afternoon, Saki finally notices the strangeness in Kaori and Yuki's behavior and relates her desire to help them. The next day, Kaori tells Yuki about the strange nostalgia she feels when around Hajime and Yuki explains a bit of their past. After school, Kaori runs into Hajime and two of their elementary school friends, Ota and Yamasato, at the crêperie where she explains that she genuinely doesn't remember Hajime before some painful memories surface, causing her to run away in a panic. Just then, Yuki shows up and vents his frustration on Hajime before deciding to reveal Kaori's condition to him. Afterwards a disbelieving Hajime questions the integrity of Yuki and Kaori's friendship. At the same time, Saki meets Kaori at the river and mentions that the former considers Yuki to be an important friend. Finally, Yuki firmly asserts his friendship with Kaori and resolves to become her friend all over again from the beginning.
11	"Important Friend."; Transliteration: "Taisetsu na Tomodachi." (Japanese: 大切なトモダチ。)	June 15, 2014	
As the winter season looms, Yuki continues making slow progress with Kaori, while at the same time, Saki begins avoiding Shogo because of their previous discussion. That afternoon, Maiko and Ai decide to take Kaori home and Yuki questions Hajime about the previous Friday's events at the crêperie, with the former deciding to take Yuki to a restaurant to meet with Ota and Yamasato. While there, Yuki asks Hajime about his past with Kaori and learns of their popularity and study sessions in elementary school, reminding Yuki of his current relationship with her. As Ota and Yamasato show up they explain that Kaori was bullied by her classmates led by her so-called friend Shigahara Naomi out of envy at her relationship with Hajime. This caused her to flee in tears and was subsequently hit by a car, thus missing her meeting with Hajime and resulting in her memory loss, much to Yuki and Hajime's shock. At the same time, Kaori hears the conversation and breaks into tears after which Hajime ends up blaming himself for her condition. The next Monday, Kaori tells Yuki about her relief at knowing the truth. However Yuki confides in Shogo of his fear that he may unintentionally hurt Kaori and hence, starts distancing himself from her.
12	"I'd Like for Us to Be Friends."; Transliteration: "Tomodachi ni Natte Kudasai." (Japanese: 友達になってください。)	June 22, 2014	
One evening, Kaori asks Shogo to explain why Yuki had started avoiding her, with the explanation that Yuki doesn't want to hurt her, ironically serving to hurt her further. The following day, Shogo corners Saki into admitting that she had been avoiding him because she believed he was angry at her, prompting him to apologize. After school, Shogo warns Yuki that everyone else had noticed the rift between him and Kaori. As Winter break begins, Yuki inadvertently runs into Kaori at the bridge much to his surprise and they decide to take a stroll together. During their walk, Kaori recalls how much her life has changed thanks to Yuki after which they finally purchase crêpes together. Afterwards, they both reluctantly try to part ways, although Yuki elects to walk Kaori home and they eventually ends up at an old Shinto shrine. While paying their respects, Kaori tearfully confesses her wish to be even closer friends with Yuki despite his avoidance of her. Realizing that his actions only hurt Kaori, Yuki also confesses the same. As the New Year and school term begins, Yuki recalls the importance of treasuring the memories shared with his friends and of creating new memories. Finally, Yuki approaches Kaori in the class one morning, and both ask each other to be friends. In the epilogue, Yuki begins keeping a diary and wonders about the things that Kaori writes in hers.

=== Specials ===
The following special episodes are part of a mini-series titled, Kaori's Diary (香織の日記, Kaori no Nikki) and were released together with the BD / DVD sets of the main anime series. The episodes recall the events of the original anime series told in retrospect from Kaori's point of view as she writes in her diary.

No.	English title Original Japanese title	Original release date
1	"May 22nd (Thursday)"; Transliteration: "5 Gatsu 22 Nichi Mokuyōbi" (Japanese: 5月22日木曜日)	June 18, 2014
Kaori writes about the time Yuki had struggled with a math problem during class and about the smile she put on his face when explaining why she likes math.
2	"June 9th (Monday)"; Transliteration: "6 Gatsu Kokonoka Getsuyōbi" (Japanese: 6月9日月曜日)	July 16, 2014
Kaori describes Shogo's seemingly cold personality but comes to understand him a little better after she asks Yuki about him.
3	"June 25th (Wednesday)"; Transliteration: "6 Gatsu 25 Nichi Suiyōbi" (Japanese: 6月25日水曜日)	July 16, 2014
Kaori writes about the time she had lost her diary and about how hard Yuki tried to find it.
4	"June 27th (Friday)"; Transliteration: "6 Gatsu 27 Nichi Kinyōbi" (Japanese: 6月27日金曜日)	August 20, 2014
Kaori writes about the date she had with Saki one Friday after school.
5	"July 3rd (Thursday)"; Transliteration: "7 Gatsu Mikka Mokuyōbi" (Japanese: 7月3日木曜日)	August 20, 2014
Kaori writes about the afternoon that herself, Yuki, Shogo and Saki gathered at her house to study.
6	"July 11th (Friday)"; Transliteration: "7 Gatsu 11 Nichi Kinyōbi" (Japanese: 7月11日金曜日)	September 17, 2014
7	"August 18th (Monday)"; Transliteration: "8 Gatsu 18 Nichi Getsuyōbi" (Japanese: 8月18日月曜日)	September 17, 2014
8	"August 31st (Sunday)"; Transliteration: "8 Gatsu 31 Nichi Nichiyōbi" (Japanese: 8月31日 日曜日)	October 15, 2014
9	"September 8th (Monday)"; Transliteration: "9 Gatsu 8 Nichi Getsuyōbi" (Japanese: 9月8日 月曜日)	October 15, 2014
10	"November 7th (Friday)"; Transliteration: "11 Gatsu Nanoka Kinyōbi" (Japanese: 11月7日金曜日)	November 19, 2014
11	"January 8th (Thursday)"; Transliteration: "1 Gatsu Yōka Mokuyōbi" (Japanese: 1月8日木曜日)	November 19, 2014
12	"Hase's Diary"; Transliteration: "Hase no Nikki" (Japanese: 長谷の日記)	November 19, 2014

== Home media ==
Square Enix began releasing the series in Japan on Blu-ray and DVD volumes starting on June 18, 2014. The complete series will be released on subtitled DVD format by Madman Entertainment on May 20, 2015. The complete series will be released by Sentai Filmworks on DVD and Blu-ray format on July 7, 2015. These releases will contain Japanese audio and English subtitles.

Square Enix (Japan – Region 2/A)
Vol.	Episodes	Blu-ray / DVD artwork	Bonus disc / material	BD / DVD Release date	BD Ref.	DVD Ref.
1	1, 2	Yuki Hase & Kaori Fujimiya	Soundtrack CD / Special booklet Vol. 1	June 18, 2014		
2	3, 4	Kaori & Yuki	Special booklet Vol. 2	July 16, 2014		
3	5, 6	Kaori, Saki, Yuki & Shogo	Special booklet Vol. 3	August 20, 2014		
4	7, 8	Yuki & Kaori (front), Shogo & Saki (back)	Special booklet Vol. 4	September 17, 2014		
5	9, 10	Kaori (front), Yuki & Hajime Kujo (back)	Special booklet Vol. 5	October 15, 2014		
6	11, 12	Yuki & Kaori	Special booklet Vol. 6	November 19, 2014		

Madman Entertainment (Region 4 – Australia / New Zealand)
Vol.	Episodes	DVD artwork	DVD Release date	DVD Ref.
1	1–12	Yuki Hase & Kaori Fujimiya	May 20, 2015	

Sentai Filmworks (Region 1 – North America)
Vol.	Episodes	Blu-ray / DVD artwork	BD / DVD Release date	BD Ref.	DVD Ref.
1	1–12	Kaori Fujimiya & Yuki Hase	July 7, 2015		
