= Orange (animation studio) =

Japanese animation studio

Orange Co., Ltd.
- Native name: 有限会社オレンジ
- Romanized name: Yūgen-gaisha Orenji
- Type: Yūgen-gaisha
- Industry: Japanese animation
- Founded: May 1, 2004; 22 years ago
- Founder: Eiji Inomoto
- Headquarters: Musashino, Tokyo, Japan
- Number of employees: 170 (as of February 2026)
- Website: www.orange-cg.com

Orange Co., Ltd. (Japanese: 有限会社オレンジ, Hepburn: Yūgen-gaisha Orenji) is a Japanese animation studio based in Musashino, Tokyo that specializes in the production of computer animated films and tv shows. The studio is known for its exaggerated 3D and directing style, which differs from the traditional movement often found in CG works.

On December 19, 2024, it was announced that Toho would acquire a 19.7% stake in the studio which was completed on January 17, 2025.

== Establishment ==
Eiji Inomoto, a CG animator who had become somewhat well known for his work on Zoids: Chaotic Century and Ghost in the Shell: Stand Alone Complex (as one of the main Tachikoma 3D Unit members), founded Orange on May 1, 2004. For a majority of the studio's early history, the company mainly did outsourced 3D work for other studio's productions, like the original anime Heroic Age in 2007 (for Xebec) and the adaptation of Rail Wars! (for Passione) in 2014. It wasn't until 2013, 9 years after its founding, that Orange was involved a major project's production on a significant level: their co-production of Majestic Prince with studio Doga Kobo. Following Majestic Prince, the company began co-producing a number of works, like Black Bullet with Kinema Citrus, and in 2017, the studio produced its first anime not under a co-production. This was an adaptation of Land of the Lustrous, which was met with positive critical reception, with praise being given for its usage of CG animation.

== Works ==
The list below is a list of Orange's works as a lead animation studio.

=== Anime television series ===
Title	Director(s)	First run start date	First run end date	Eps	Note(s)	Ref(s)
Majestic Prince	Keitaro Motonaga	April 4, 2013	September 19, 2013	24	Based on the manga by Rando Ayamine. Co-production with Doga Kobo.	
Black Bullet	Masayuki Kojima	April 8, 2014	July 1, 2014	13	Based on a light novel by Shiden Kanzaki and Saki Ukai. Co-production with Kinema Citrus.	
Active Raid	Gorō Taniguchi; Noriaki Akitaya	January 7, 2016	September 27, 2016	24	Original work. 3DCG animation services for Production IMS.	
Norn9	Takao Abo	January 7, 2016	March 31, 2016	12	Based on an otome game by Otomate. Co-production with Kinema Citrus.	
Dimension W	Kanta Kamei	January 10, 2016	March 27, 2016	12	Based on the manga by Yūji Iwahara. Co-production with 3Hz.	
Land of the Lustrous	Takahiko Kyōgoku	October 7, 2017	December 23, 2017	12	Based on the manga by Haruko Ichikawa.	
Beastars	Shin'ichi Matsumi	October 10, 2019	December 26, 2019	12	Based on the manga by Paru Itagaki.	
Beastars Season 2	Shin'ichi Matsumi	January 7, 2021	March 25, 2021	12	Sequel to Beastars.	
Godzilla Singular Point	Atsushi Takahashi	April 1, 2021	June 24, 2021	13	Original work in the Godzilla franchise. Co-production with Bones.	
Trigun Stampede	Kenji Mutō	January 7, 2023	March 25, 2023	12	Based on the manga by Yasuhiro Nightow.	
Beastars Final Season	Shin'ichi Matsumi	December 5, 2024	March 7, 2026	24	Sequel to Beastars Season 2.	
Trigun Stargaze	Masako Satō	January 10, 2026	March 28, 2026	12	Sequel to Trigun Stampede.	

=== OVAs, ONAs, and television specials ===
Title	Director	Release date	Note(s)	Ref(s)
Star Fox Zero: The Battle Begins	Kyoji Asano	April 20, 2016	3DCG animation services for Wit Studio.	
Under the Dog	Masahiro Andō	August 1, 2016	Co-production with Kinema Citrus.	
Dimension W	Kanta Kamei	August 26, 2016	Unaired episode bundled with the anime 6th Blu-ray release. Co-production with 3Hz.	
Majestic Prince: Wings to the Future	Keitaro Motonaga	September 29, 2016	Television movie lead-in to a feature film Majestic Prince: Genetic Awakening series' ending. Co-production with Seven Arcs Pictures.	
The Idolmaster Cinderella Girls Spin-off!	Naoki Yoshibe	November 10, 2019	Part of The Idolmaster media franchise.	
Leviathan	Christophe Ferreira	July 10, 2025	Based on the novel trilogy by Scott Westerfeld. Co-production with Qubic Pictures.	
TBA	TBA	TBA	Original work in the Godzilla franchise. Animation services for Toho and Igloo Studio.	

=== Films ===
Title	Director	Release date	Note(s)	Ref(s)
Neppu Kairiku Bushi Road	Masayuki Sakoi	December 31, 2013	Based on a media franchise created by Sunao Yoshida. Co-production with Kinema Citrus.	
Majestic Prince: Genetic Awakening	Keitaro Motonoga	November 4, 2016	Film sequel to Majestic Prince: Wings to the Future. Co-production with Seven Arcs Pictures.	
Monster Strike the Movie: Sora no Kanata	Hiroshi Nishikiori	October 5, 2018	Part of the Monster Strike media franchise.	
Gekijōban Idolish7 Live 4bit Beyond the Period	Hiroshi Nishikiori; Kensuke Yamamoto	May 20, 2023	Part of the Idolish7 media franchise.	
