= Holy Talker =

Japanese manga series

- Cover of the first volume of the manga, featuring Moegi, Renga and Amakusa

ホーリートーカー (Hōrī Tōkā)
- Manga
- Written by: Rando Ayamine
- Published by: Kodansha
- Magazine: Monthly Shōnen Rival
- Original run: April 2008 – on hold
- Volumes: 6

Holy Talker (ホーリートーカー, Hōrī Tōkā), is a Japanese manga series illustrated by Rando Ayamine. The manga began serialization in the April 2008 issue of Kodansha's magazine Shōnen Rival. Six tankōbon volumes have been released in Japan before the series was interrupted.

== Plot ==
The world is infested with demons. They seek the perverse desires of man, take possession of things and people and eat their souls. Fighting them is the task entrusted to the Executive Committee of the Sacred White Lily; also known as the Apostles. Originally formed by Renga Takayama, Suou Kagayama, and Noshime Kinoshita, they are one day joined by mysterious new student Chitose Amakusa, who shares his body with a powerful demon with a black wing.

In addition to driving out the demons in their region using the Holy Grail, the Apostles of the Committee must also protect the Holy Mother Moegi Takayama (younger sister of Renga and symbol of the descent of the Virgin Mary in the world) from their attacks.

The goal of the demons is in fact eating the soul of the Holy Mother. Thich will allow them to open the Sin Place; the gate that connects the Earth to the Kingdom of the demons, so that they can come and go as they please from the human world.

After defeating Sinclair, the Apostles must prevent the release of the Second Soul.

== Characters ==
Renga "Ren" Takayama (高山 煉瓦, Takayama Renga)
The head of the Executive Committee of the Sacred White Lily, he's very protective of his younger sister Moegi and doesn't want anyone to touch her, especially Amakusa. When he thinks about her, his nose bleeds. His parents died ten years ago. To fight the demons, he uses the Takemikazuchi sword, which is broken during the final battle against Sinclair. With the help of Tou Inaba and Moegi, he reaches the Kingdom of the demons to free Amakusa from the control of the king of demons; here, during the battle, he discovers that his memories have been sealed when he was a kid: from what Renga partially remembers, he was one of Sinclair's student along with Amakusa and the two children opened the Sin Place using the Yohentenmoku.

Moegi Takayama (高山 萌葱, Takayama Moegi)
The representative of the Executive Committee, on her back there's the stigma symbol of the descent of the Holy Mother. Her mother Asagi has filled that same role before her. Her blood is used to create the Holy Grail, which returns the demon in hell and saves the soul of the person possessed. She falls in love with Amakusa; she's naive and stubborn, but she always smiles.

Chitose Amakusa (天草 千歳, Amakusa Chitose)
A priest moved from Lourdes, his body is the home of a demon with a black wing, who eats the souls of demons rather than send them to hell. His teacher at Lourdes was Sinclair. He has a quiet nature, while the demon is strong, arrogant and quick. He made a pact with him: his enormous strength against the time he has to live. When it's not the demon in his body to fight other demons, he uses the "Stick with two wings": when idle, it takes the form of a little demon, connected to the soul of Amakusa, which reflects his emotions. Suddenly, the demon in his body takes over and reaches Sinclair: it turns out that the demon in the body of Amakusa is the king of demons, whose soul has been stolen and placed in Amakusa. Renga manages to get his friend back by inserting into his body the servant demon of the "Stick with the two wings", which contains a fragment of his soul. After his awakening, Amakusa stays in the kingdom of demons to fight Sinclair alone.

Suou Kagayama (加賀山 蘇芳, Kagayama Suō)
To fight demons he uses a flute. He's sarcastic; his older sister died five years ago after a demon ate her soul: for this reason, he nourished a deep hatred for them.

Noshime Kinoshita (木下 熨斗目, Kinoshita Noshime)
Fond of erotic games, she works with Suou and her job is sealing the demons with the Holy Grail.

Kuri Matsutouin (松東院 涅, Matsutouin Kuri)
Heir of the hospital complex Matsutouin and a doctor in the infirmary unit of the Institute, owned by her grandfather, she's the advisor of the Committee and report any orders from the top.

Tou Inaba X (稲葉 藤黄, Inaba Tou)
Apostle of the previous Holy Mother, is the ceramist who manufactured the Yohentenmoku. After the death of the former Holy Mother, he retired to live in the mountains of Kyoto with Kikyo and Fuji, his nieces. He spends his days getting drunk and playing pachinko. After meeting the Apostles, he decides to help them: with Renga and Moegi, he creates a temporary gate to the Kingdom of the demons to free Amakusa.

Sanken of Fatima
She manages the Institute of the Sacred White Lily. Spokesman of the previous Holy Mother, she's the one who sealed the soul of the King of demons. Her name is just a pseudonym. Her soul is stolen to open the Sin Place, but she's then released by Amakusa. She reads the future in the Moon.

Sinclair (シンクレア, Shinkurea)
The teacher of Amakusa in Lourdes. Apostle of the previous Holy Mother, he sold his soul to the demons becoming an Apostle of the King of demons, and ten years before he tried to destroy God. Its goal is to get the seven souls needed to open the Sin Place, the gate of hell, in order to recover the body of the King of the demons and bring about its rebirth. He convinced Tou Inaba to forge the Yohentenmoku, a Holy Grail in the service of evil, built using the blood and the souls of seven Apostles. He can use any magical weapon without a contract. During the final battle, he's sealed by the Holy Grail.

Duke Shade of one thousand eyes (千眼の公爵, Sen me no kōshaku)
Apostle of the King of demons, his job is to keep an eye on Tou Inaba. He uses the grasshoppers. After a bitter struggle, the Executive Committee, helped by Tou Inaba, manages to defeat him; however, he survives, but the King eats his soul.
