= GetBackers =

Japanese manga series

- First tankōbon volume cover, featuring Ginji Amano (left) and Ban Mido (right)

GetBackers -奪還屋- (Gettobakkāzu Dakkan'ya)
- Genre: Action; Comedy; Supernatural
- Manga
- Written by: Yuya Aoki
- Illustrated by: Rando Ayamine
- Published by: Kodansha
- English publisher: NA: Tokyopop
- Imprint: Shōnen Magazine Comics
- Magazine: Weekly Shōnen Magazine
- Original run: March 24, 1999 – February 21, 2007
- Volumes: 39
- Anime television series
- Directed by: Kazuhiro Furuhashi; Keitaro Motonaga
- Produced by: Kaoru Sakamoto; Kazunori Noguchi; Satoshi Kohno
- Written by: Akemi Omode
- Music by: Taku Iwasaki
- Studio: Studio Deen
- Licensed by: AUS: Madman Entertainment; NA: Sentai Filmworks
- Original network: JNN (TBS)
- English network: NA: Anime Network; SEA: Animax Asia
- Original run: October 5, 2002 – September 20, 2003
- Episodes: 49
- icon

GetBackers (Japanese: GetBackers -奪還屋-, Hepburn: Gettobakkāzu Dakkan'ya; 'GetBackers: Recovery Service') is a Japanese manga series written by Yuya Aoki and illustrated by Rando Ayamine. It was serialized in Kodansha's shōnen manga magazine Weekly Shōnen Magazine from March 1999 to February 2007, with its chapters collected in 39 tankōbon volumes. The series follows the GetBackers, a pair of youths endowed with supernatural abilities who specialize in recovering lost or stolen items.

A 49-episode anime television series adaptation animated by Studio Deen was broadcast on TBS from October 2002 to September 2003. The manga series was licensed for English release in North America by Tokyopop, which released 27 volumes between February 2004 and December 2008; its license expired in 2009.

== Plot ==
Ginji Amano and Ban Mido are superhuman operatives known as the GetBackers, a freelance repossession team based in a disreputable district of Shinjuku, Tokyo. Specializing in the recovery of lost or stolen items, they claim an exceptionally high success rate, undertaking assignments that frequently involve perilous and unusual circumstances. Their targets vary widely, from mundane personal belongings to components of advanced weaponry. Their exploits are often intertwined with their own complex histories.

A significant portion of their endeavors takes place within the Infinity Fortress, an enigmatic structure composed of interconnected condemned buildings, functioning as a self-sustained microcosm. The Fortress is divided into three distinct regions: Lower Town, the lowest and most subterranean sector; the Beltline, a hazardous intermediary zone; and Babylon City, the highest level. Babylon City serves as the domain of the Brain Trust, the clandestine organization responsible for the Fortress's creation, and is also the residence of Ginji's mother. It is later revealed that Babylon City constitutes the true reality, while the external world exists as a virtual construct. Access to Babylon City is permitted exclusively to those who prevail in the Ogre Battle, a combat tournament whose victors earn the right to reshape reality as they see fit.

Ban and Ginji venture into the Infinity Fortress—Ban to rescue their ally Himiko, and Ginji to reunite with his mother. Within the Beltline, they confront numerous adversaries under the command of the Voodoo King, an entity seeking to breach Babylon City's sealed gates, a barrier established years prior by Ban's grandmother, the Witch Queen. Following the Voodoo King's defeat, Ban and Ginji engage in the Ogre Battle, where Ban concedes upon recognizing Ginji's resolve. Ginji proceeds to Babylon City, encountering his mother, who originates from a parallel universe. She discloses her role in fabricating the Infinity Fortress and its simulated world. After their exchange, the Fortress undergoes a transformation, with its virtual inhabitants gaining true existence. The GetBackers resume their retrieval operations, and their next mission sets them on a path toward Ban's mother.

== Development ==
Yuya Aoki conceived the idea of GetBackers two years before it started serialization. By that time he had few notes about it. Aoki remembers giving many troubles to his editor when he started writing it, but was glad he could finish it. The character of Ban Mido was originally meant to appear in another series from Aoki, but his editor liked it and wanted it to be one of the manga's protagonists. Ginji was meant to appear in the series, but his original personality was first meant to belong to Ban.

== Media ==
=== Manga ===
GetBackers, written by Yuya Aoki and illustrated by Rando Ayamine, was serialized in Kodansha's shōnen manga Weekly Shōnen Magazine from March 24, 1999, to February 21, 2007. (Note: The series finished in the magazine's 12th issue of 2007 (cover date March 7), released on February 21 of the same year.) Kodansha collected its chapters in 39 tankōbon volumes, released from August 17, 1999, to April 17, 2007. An additional one-shot chapter was published in Magazine Special on February 20, 2009.

GetBackers was licensed for English release in North America by Tokyopop, who first announced the acquisition in the Anime Expo 2004 in July 2003. Tokyopop split the manga into two parts: GetBackers (volumes 1–25) and GetBackers: Infinity Fortress (subsequent volumes). The first part was published from February 10, 2004, to July 7, 2008, while Infinity Fortress had two volumes released on September 9 and December 9, 2008. only these two volumes were released. On August 31, 2009, Tokyopop announced that the rights to the series had expired.

An artbook, titled G/B was released on March 15, 2005. A guidebook, titled GetBackers: The Last Piece, was released on April 17, 2007, containing information about the series' plot, characters, and popularity polls.

=== Anime ===
==== Television series ====
The anime adaptation of the GetBackers series was produced by Studio Deen and was directed by Kazuhiro Furuhashi and Keitaro Motonaga. The series was broadcast for 49 episodes on TBS from October 5, 2002, to September 20, 2003. The series was released to Region 2 DVD in Japan by TBS in seventeen individual volumes with three episodes per disc. The anime's music was composed by Taku Iwasaki, and two original soundtracks were released by Pioneer Corporation on January 24 and July 25, 2003.

The anime was first licensed in English by ADV Films. The series was released on ten DVD volumes from August 24, 2004, to November 1, 2005. Two DVD box sets were released on October 10, 2006, and January 2, 2007, The entire series was released on single box set on January 15, 2008. In April 2009, A.D. Vision started streaming the series online on its Anime Network website. The series has been re-licensed by Sentai Filmworks, who re-released it on DVD on May 8, 2012. On August 25, 2016, the series began airing on ShortsTV.

The series was broadcast on Animax Asia in Southeast Asia, and ABS-CBN/Studio 23 in the Philippines.

==== Comic anime ====
On November 19, 2026, it was announced that the manga would receive a comic anime set to release on YouTube on December 1 of the same year. The AI platform MangaNow Studio is directing, producing, and editing it. It will star Tarо̄ Shumi as Ban Mido and Takayuki Itо̄ as Ginji Amano.

=== Drama CDs ===
Two drama CDs have been released for the story arcs not found in the TV series, namely the news involving the GetBackers searching for disappeared kids involved with a card game named the Divine Design, their search for a red wine named the Marine Red, and the war between Shido Fuyuki's clan, the Maryudo and their rivals, the Kiryudo. The first CD, entitled 'GetBackers "Target G"', was released February 21, 2003. The second entitled 'GetBackers "Target B"' was released on March 21, 2003.

=== Video games ===
A total of five video games based on GetBackers have been released in Japan, all of them developed and published by Konami. The first was a fighting game GetBackers Dakkanoku: Ubawareta Mugenshiro for the PlayStation 2 and PC on September 26, 2002. GetBackers Dakkanoku - Jagan Fuuin! followed it in 2003 for the PC and Game Boy Advance, as well as the PC exclusive RPG GetBackers Dakkanoku: Metropolis Dakkan Sakusen!. Two more fighting games, GetBackers Dakkanoku: Dakkandayo! Zenin Shuugou! and GetBackers Dakkanoku – Urashinshiku Saikyou Battle, were released in 2003 and 2004, respectively. While the former was only for PCs, the latter was also released for the PlayStation 2. Rando Ayamine worked for all these video games, making illustrations for them.

The 2009 PlayStation Portable fighting game, Sunday vs Magazine: Shūketsu! Chōjō Daikessen, also produced by Konami, included Ban Mido as a playable character.

== Reception ==
The GetBackers manga has had over 18 million copies in circulation. English volumes from the manga have also been popular, appearing various times in Diamond Comic's rankings of best selling graphic novels. Anime News Network's Liann Cooper has commented on the manga, praising for using the "simple concept" in order to create an entertaining plot. The manga has been noted to have a large number of types of fan service, showing several kinds of beautiful women and noted a "relationship" between the two main characters and giving the series a nice bishōnen tone. The art of Rando Ayamine has been praised for having the dark and gritty mood emphasizes he makes in the series making readers think that the Jagan scene of Ban Mido is a "horrifying nightmare". The Tokyopop translation of the manga has been criticized for making the main characters sound like gangsters giving them strange dialogues. Cooper later noted that readers from Clamp's works or Rurouni Kenshin would find GetBackers appealing due to the several aspects it has. He still found issues with Tokyopop's translation, but still found the final product entertaining, also complimenting the series' comedy.

The anime adaptation of GetBackers was also well received. In the 26th annual Animage readers' poll, it took various categories: it was third in "Favorite Anime Series", ninth in "Favorite Episode" (episode 49) and fifth and eighth in "Favorite Male Character" (Ginji and Ban, respectively). It also received positive reviews ever since the first episode's premiere in Japan. For such an episode, Anime News Network liked the animations' quality as well as the main characters Ban and Ginji. The mix between drama and comedy was also well-received, hoping that it will continue like that for the remainder of the series. DVD Talk's John Sinnott called it a "solid show", enjoying the characters' growth as the series continued. However, he gave a low score on the DVDs' presentation mainly due to the lack of extras. While comparing it with the manga, Chris Beveridge from Mania Entertainment found the anime's introduction more appealing than the manga's but mentioned various issues already shown in the first episodes of various anime. Bamboo Dong from Anime News Network enjoyed how the story was built during the first season, finding appealing the fact that the characters he found appealing would take part in a larger story arc. Agreeing with Dong, Dani Moure from Mania liked the interaction between the characters, as well as a bigger exploration to some of them. Sinott concluded that the story arc involving the Limitless Fortress was "a good story" due to the expansion in the backgrounds from various of the main characters, but found it relatively longer than previous story arcs. Active Anime writer David C. Jones praised the focus on the anime's second season, liking how many secondary characters got their own episodes, as well as how the comedy was delivered across them, citing the episode focused on Ginji in the hospital as the best one from the season. On the other hand, Beveridge found that in the second season, characters were "overused", but like Jones, enjoyed the focus on other characters as well as the flashbacks exploring them. The anime's last story arc left mixed thoughts to Beveridge who found some of its events predictable or rushed, but still enjoyed the action sequences shown.
