= Majestic Prince (franchise) =

Japanese manga

- Cover of the first manga volume

マジェスティックプリンス (Majesutikku Purinsu)
- Genre: Mecha; Military science fiction Comedy drama
- Created by: Fields Corporation; Sotsu
- Manga
- Written by: Rando Ayamine
- Illustrated by: Hikaru Niijima
- Published by: Hero's Inc.
- Magazine: Monthly Hero's
- Original run: November 1, 2011 – March 1, 2019
- Volumes: 16
- Anime television series

Galactic Armored Fleet Majestic Prince
- Directed by: Keitaro Motonaga
- Written by: Reiko Yoshida
- Music by: Toshiyuki Watanabe
- Studio: Doga Kobo, Orange
- Licensed by: AUS: Hanabee; NA: Sentai Filmworks
- Original network: Tokyo MX, tvk, KBS, SUN
- English network: NA: Anime Network; PH: HERO
- Original run: April 4, 2013 – September 19, 2013
- Episodes: 24
- Manga

Galactic Armored Fleet Majestic Prince
- Written by: Yūsuke Ozaki
- Published by: Kadokawa Shoten
- Magazine: Newtype Ace → Kadokawa Niconico Ace
- Original run: April 10, 2013 – October 18, 2013
- Volumes: 2
- Anime television film

Galactic Armored Fleet Majestic Prince: Wings to the Future
- Directed by: Keitaro Motonaga
- Written by: Reiko Yoshida; Fumihiko Shimo
- Music by: Toshiyuki Watanabe
- Studio: Seven Arcs, Orange
- Licensed by: NA: Sentai Filmworks
- Original network: Tokyo MX, tvk, KBS
- English network: NA: Anime Network
- Released: September 29, 2016
- Runtime: 23 minutes
- Anime film

Galactic Armored Fleet Majestic Prince: Genetic Awakening
- Directed by: Keitaro Motonaga
- Written by: Reiko Yoshida; Yoshitaka Shishido
- Music by: Toshiyuki Watanabe
- Studio: Seven Arcs, Orange
- Licensed by: NA: Sentai Filmworks
- Released: November 4, 2016
- Runtime: 77 minutes
- icon

Majestic Prince (Japanese: マジェスティックプリンス, Hepburn: Majesutikku Purinsu) is a science fiction multimedia project created by Japanese company FIELDS. A manga series, written by Rando Ayamine, illustrated by Hikaru Niijima and with original work/planning credited to Fields/Sotsu, began serialisation in 2011. Its anime television series, Majestic Prince (銀河機攻隊 マジェスティックプリンス, Ginga Kikōtai Majesutikku Purinsu; lit. "Galactic Armored Fleet Majestic Prince") was developed by Doga Kobo and Orange, and was broadcast in Japan on Tokyo MX from April 4, 2013, to September 19, 2013, and was streamed with English subtitles by Crunchyroll. The anime was licensed by Sentai Filmworks, and the Anime Network. with its dub home video release in 2014. In July 2016 the episodes were rebroadcast, with a new "25th episode" on September 29, 2016, with events leading to a feature film released in November. The manga series concluded in March 2019.

== Plot ==
In the year 2110, humanity has expanded its frontier into space in its drive for new resources. Advances in genetic engineering research led to the establishment of the MJP (Military Junior Pre-Academy) project, which saw the creation of genetically enhanced humans known as the Evolved Children, developed with the intention of allowing humans to adapt to the new frontier. However, when Earth finds itself under threat by an alien race called the Wulgaru, human forces decide to have the evolved children deployed as soldiers to fight on the front lines.

Team Rabbits, a quintet of evolved children whose troubling lack of teamwork and common sense prevents them from reaching their true potential, are selected as test pilots of cutting edge mobile battle suits called AHSMB (Advanced High Standard Multipurpose Battle Device), powered by the Juria System, a cutting-edge technology whose effectiveness in combat is increased according to the survival instincts of whoever uses it.^{Ep. 4} As they join forces to overcome their personal weaknesses and achieve their true potential, the members of Team Rabbits (nicknamed Majestic Princes because of their association with MJP^{Ep. 2}) eventually assume a key role in mankind's effort to thwart the alien invasion of Earth.

== Media ==
=== Anime ===
The opening theme for episodes 2 through 12 is "Watashi wa Sōzō-suru" (私は想像する; "I Imagine") performed by Natsumi Kon. The ending theme for episodes 1 to 12 is "Sayonara tte Iu" (サヨナラっていう; "I'll Say Goodbye") performed by Chiaki Ishikawa. Ishikawa also wrote and composed both songs. The opening and ending themes change on episode 13 to "PROMPT", performed by Kon, and "Arigatō. Tadaima." (アリガトウ。タダイマ。; "Thank You. I'm Here.") performed by Yōko Hikasa and Yuka Iguchi as their characters Kei Kugimiya and Tamaki Irie, respectively. "Bokutachi wa Ikiteiru (僕たちは生きている)" by Izuru Hitachi (Hiroki Aiba), Toshikaze Asagi (Shintaro Asanuma), Ataru Suruga (Junya Ikeda) is the 3rd ending, and runs in episode 16 and episodes 20–22. The second ending returns for episodes 13–15, 17-18 and 23. "Respect Me" by Chiaki Ishikawa is the ending for episode 19 and "Watashi wa Souzousuru (私は想像する)" by Natsumi Kon is the ending for episode 24. Episode 6 features an insert song written by Ishikawa and performed by Kon titled "Kokoro" (ココロ; "Heart"), and episode 24 features "So no Gyaku" (その逆; "Oppositely"), written and performed by Ishikawa. The anime was rebroadcast from July to September 2016, two episodes per week in a special programming block titled "Majestic Hour". On September 29, 2016, a 25th episode aired, which serves as a lead-in to a feature film released in November 2016. The film features "Kokoro wa Hitotsu Janai" (心はひとつじゃない; "There Isn't Just One Heart") as well as a returning "PROMPT" as insert songs, both performed by Kon. The credits theme for the film is "Kienai Sora" (消えない宙; "Eternal Space"), performed by Kon.

=== Manga ===
Majestic Prince, written by Rando Ayamine and illustrated by Hikaru Niijima, was published in Hero's Inc.'s Monthly Hero's from November 1, 2011, to March 1, 2019. The first tankōbon (bound volume) of the series was released on October 5, 2012; the sixteenth and last was released on May 2, 2019.

Yūsuke Ozaki serialized a parallel manga, Galactic Armored Fleet Majestic Prince, initially in Kadokawa Shoten's Newtype Ace, starting on April 4, 2013. On July 10, 2013, Kadokawa ceased Newtype Ace; the manga restarted on August 20 in Kadokawa Niconico Ace, where it was published until October 18, 2013. The manga was compiled into two volumes were released by Kadokawa on July 6, 2013, and November 9, 2013.

== Works cited ==
- "Ch." is shortened form for chapter and refers to a chapter number of the Majestic Prince manga
- "Ep." is shortened form for episode and refers to an episode number of the Majestic Prince anime. English version by Sentai Filmworks. The listings for Japanese Vocal Cast and English Vocal Cast in the closing credits.
