= Natsumi Kon =

Japanese actress and singer (born 1991)

- 昆 夏美
- Born: 28 June 1991 (age 35); Hachiōji, Tokyo, Japan
- Occupations: Actress; singer
- Years active: 2011–
- Agent: Toho Entertainment
- Known for: Musicals; Roméo et Juliette; Hamlet; Les Misérables; Miss Saigon; Stage; Yūdoku Shōnen; Music Play The Little Prince; Films; Beauty and the Beast
- Website: Official website

Natsumi Kon 昆 夏美
- Genres: J-pop; anime song
- Occupation: Singer
- Instrument: Vocal
- Years active: 2013–
- Label: Toho animation Records
- Website: Official website

Natsumi Kon (昆 夏美, Kon Natsumi; born 28 June 1991) is a Japanese musical actress and singer. She is best known for playing Juliette in the musical Roméo et Juliette, which made her professional debut and is recognised as "new-generation diva of the musical world".

== Early life and education ==
Born in Hachiōji, Tokyo, Kon graduated from Senzoku Gakuen College of Music Faculty of Music Musical Course. Kon enjoyed singing from a very young age, as well as dancing. From 2003 to 2006 she was part of the Children's Theatre Ōkina Yume and acted primarily in leading roles. She was determined to become a musical theatre actress and joined the music department in Senzoku Gakuen High School. In 2009, when on her third grade, Kon was selected for the role of Anne in Anne of Green Gables.

Jazz pianist Ai Kuwabara was her high school classmate.

== Career ==
Kon passed the audition for Toho Entertainment in 2011, while enrolled in her second year of college, and was selected as Juliette for the musical Roméo et Juliette, which was her official stage debut. In the same year she starred in her first professional play, Yūdoku Shōnen. She then appeared in renowned shows, such as Hamlet, as Ophelia and Les Misérables, as both Éponine and Fantine. She was called the "new-generation diva of the musical world" for her singing ability.

In 2012, Kon made her first television appearance as Clara in TV Asahi's Murder at Mt. Fuji, and in 2013 she debuted as a singer with the opening theme "Watashi wa Sōzō suru" in the television anime Majestic Prince.

When she graduated from the Senzoku Gakuen College of Music Faculty of Music Musical Course in 2014, she played in the musicals The Addams Family as Wednesday Addams and Miss Saigon as Kim. (Note: Triple cast with Rena Sasamoto and Rina Chinen.) In addition, she was in charge of opening theme "Niji no kakera" of the TV anime One Week Friends as a singer.

In October 2016, her performance in Miss Saigon was cancelled due to health reasons, for a nodule in her vocal folds. After surgery and rehabilitation, Kon returned to the stage 19 January 2017.

In April 2017, Kon voiced Belle, originally played by Emma Watson, in the live-action version of Beauty and the Beast.

== Stage ==
- Anne of Green Gables (Apr–Oct 2009) – as Anne Shirley
- Roméo et Juliette (Sep–Oct 2011) – as Juliette (Note: Heroine. Double cast with Rina Frank)
- Hamlet (Feb–Mar 2012) – as Ophelia
- Songs for a New World (Aug 2012)
- Les Misérables – as Éponine
  - (Apr–Nov 2013) (Note: Quadruple cast with Rena Sasamoto, Aya Hirano and Sayaka Watabiki.)
  - (Apr–Sep 2015)
  - (May–Jul 2017) (Note: Triple cast with Fuka Yuduki and Rinko Matsubara)
  - (May–Oct 2019) (Note: Triple cast with Fuka Yuduki and Tomona Yabiku)
- Sherlock Holmes –Anderson Ie no Himitsu– – as Lucy (Jan 2014)
- The Addams Family – as Wednesday Addams
  - (Apr–May 2014)
  - (Oct–Dec 2017)
- Miss Saigon – as Kim
  - (Jul–Sep 2014) (Note: Triple cast with Rena Sasamoto and Rina Chinen.)
  - (Oct 2016-Jan 2017) (Note: Triple cast with Rena Sasamoto and Sooha Kim.)
  - (Mar-Jun 2020) (Note: Quadruple cast with Mitsuki Takahata, Tomona Yabiku and Sakurako Ohara.)
  - (Aug-Oct 2022) (Note: Triple cast with Mitsuki Takahata and Tomona Yabiku.)
- First Date (Nov–Dec 2014) – as Allison
- Blood Brothers (Feb–Mar 2015) – as Linda (Note: Double cast with Marie Ueno.)
- Grand Hotel (Apr–May 2016) – as Frida Flaemmchen (Note: Double cast with Erina Mano.)
- Coin Locker Babies (Jun–Jul 2016) – as Anemones
- Nine Tales –Kyūbiko no Monogatari– (Jan 2018) – as Baika
- The Secret Garden – as Martha
  - (Jun–Jul 2018)
- Marie Antoinette – as Margrid Arnaud
  - (Sep 2018–Jan 2019) (Note: Double cast with Sonim.)
  - (Jan–Feb 2021) (Note: Double cast with Sonim.)
- Love Letters – as Melissa
  - (November 1, 2019)
- Rockabilly Jack – as Lucie Jones
  - (14 September-30 December 2019)
- Human history – as Young Woman
  - (23 October-3 November 2020)
- Merrily We Roll Along – as Beth Spencer
  - (17-31 May 2021)
- The Last Five Years – as Cathy Hiatt
  - (28 June-18 July 2021)
- DOGFIGHT – as Rose
  - (17 September-24 October 2021)
- The Rocky Horror Show – as Janet Weiss
  - (13 January-28 February 2022)
- Next to Normal – as Natalie Goodman
  - (25 March-17 April 2022) (Note: Double cast with Tomona Yabiku.)
- Matilda – as Miss Honey
  - (Spring 2023) (Note: Double cast with Miyu Sakihi.)
- Tootsie – as Sandy Lester
  - (10-30 January 2024)
- In This Corner of the World – as Suzu Urano
  - (May-July 2024) (Note: Double cast with Sakurako Ohara.)
- Les Misérables – as Fantine
  - (16 December 2024–7 June 2025) (Note: Triple cast with Erika Ikuta and Haruka Kinoshita.)
- Marie Curie – as Marie Curie
  - (25 October–30 November 2025) (Note: Double cast with Madoka Hoshikaze.)
- Welcome to the Quiet Room – as Lead
  - (Jan–Feb 2026)
- Leap of Faith – as Sam Nightingale
  - (Apr–May 2026)

=== TV series ===
- Murder at Mt. Fuji (Apr–Jun 2012, EX) – as Clara
- Boogie Woogie (2024, NHK) – as Yoshiko Yamaguchi (Li Hsiang-lan)

=== TV anime ===
- Majestic Prince (Apr 2013 –, JAITS) – as Kon Natsumi (GDF public relations officer)

=== Films ===
- Beauty and the Beast (2017, Premium Dubbed version) – Starring; as Belle

=== Live ===
- Animelo Summer Live 2015 -The Gate- (28 Aug 2015)

== Discography ==
=== Singles ===
Sheet	Release date	Title	Highest rank
1st	17 Apr 2013	Watashi wa Sōzō suru	34th
2nd	21 Aug 2013	Prompt	58th
3rd	21 May 2014	Niji no kakera	22nd
4th	5 Aug 2015	ISOtone	76th
5th	9 Nov 2016	Kienai Chū	79th

=== Television ===
Year	Song	Show name
2013	Watashi wa Souzou suru	TV anime Majestic Prince first opening theme
2013	Kokoro	TV anime Majestic Prince insert song
2013	Prompt	TV anime Majestic Prince final opening theme
2013	Kokoro wa hitotsu janai	TV anime Majestic Prince ending theme
2014	Niji no kakera	TV anime One Week Friends opening theme
2015	ISOtone	TV anime Chaos Dragon opening theme
2016	Kienai Chuu	Majestic Prince Movie: Genetic Awakening theme song
