= Rando Ayamine =

Japanese manga artist

- 綾峰欄人
- Born: February 17, 1974 (age 52); Hyōgo Prefecture
- Occupation: Manga artist
- Known for: Get Backers
- Website: Rando Ayamine's blog

Rando Ayamine (綾峰欄人, Ayamine Rando; born 1974) is a Japanese manga artist known for illustrating the GetBackers series. Since the completion of Get Backers, he has been working on a new manga series called Holy Talker.

== Works ==
- GetBackers (ゲットバッカーズ -奪還屋-) (1999–2007 Kodansha) Illustrator; English translation: (2004–2009 Tokyopop)
- Holy Talker (ホーリートーカー, Hōrī Tōkā) (2008— Kodansha)
- Oniwaka to Ushiwaka: Edge of the World (鬼若と牛若 Edge of the World) (2010— Kodansha) Illustrator
- Majestic Prince (マジェスチックプリンス) (2011—2019 Shogakukan) Script
