= List of The Kindaichi Case Files light novels =

The cover of the first volume of The Kindaichi Case Files novel, as released by Kodansha on September 22, 1994, in Japan.

The Kindaichi Case Files mystery novels are written by Seimaru Amagi, who also writes the stories for the manga series of the same title. The illustrator and co-author is Fumiya Satō. As of April 20, 2001, 9 volumes have been published in Japan by Kodansha. A portion of the anime television series episodes and the two animated films are based on the novels. All cases of Kindaichi featuring in the novels have been made into anime except for Heresy Mansion Murder Case, which is the final instalment of the novel series and the only instalment released after the conclusion of the anime television series. The fifth novel, Shanghai Mermaid Legend Murder Case, was also adapted into a live action movie.

The novel stories are somewhat connected with the stories in the original manga. For instance, Opera House, The New Murders in the novel series is a sequel to Opera House Murder Case in the manga series and Ghost Passenger Ship Murder Case in the novel series is a sequel to Lake Hiren Legend Murder case in the manga series. Some of the novels were translated to English and published in Japan.

== Volume list ==
No.	Title	Release date	ISBN
1	Opera House, The New Murders; Operazakan Arata Naru Satsujin (オペラ座館・新たなる殺人)	September 22, 1994	978-4-06-324301-7
1. "Prologue" (プロローグ, "Purorōgu"); 2. "Act One Invitation from the Opera House" (第一幕 オペラ座館からの招待状, "Dai Ichi Maku Operazakan Kara no Shōtaijō"); 3. "Act Two Carlotta is at Theatre……" (第二幕 『カルロッタは、劇場で……』, "Dai Ni Maku Karurotta wa Gekijō de……"); 4. "Act Three Locked Room Theatre" (第三幕 密室劇場, "Dai San Maku Misshitsu Gekijō"); 5. "Act Four The Wandering Phantom" (第四幕 さまよえるファントム, "Dai Yon Maku Samayoeru Fantomu"); 6. "Act Five Count Philippe is Drowned" (第五幕 『フィリップ伯爵は、湖で』, "Dai Go Maku Firippu Hakushaku wa Mizuumi de"); 7. "Act Six Joseph Buquet is Hanged……" (第六幕 『ジョゼフ・ビュケは、首を吊られ……』, "Dai Roku Maku Jonzefu Byuke wa Kubi o Tsurare……"); 8. "Act Seven Truth" (第七幕 真相, "Dai Nana Maku Shinsō"); 9. "Epilogue" (エピローグ, "Epirōgu")
2	Ghost Passenger Ship Murder Case; Yūrei Kyakusen Satsujin Jiken (幽霊客船殺人事件)	April 17, 1995	978-4-06-324304-8
1. "Prologue" (プロローグ, "Purorōgu"); 2. "Chapter One Ryūōmaru Navigation Log" (第一章 竜王丸航海日誌, "Dai Isshō Ryūōmaru Kōkai Nisshi"); 3. "Chapter Two Departure" (第二章 出航, "Dai Ni Shō Shūkō"); 4. "Chapter Three Ghost Ship Mary Celeste" (第三章 幽霊船マリー・セレスト号, "Dai San Shō Yūreisen Marī Seresuto Gō"); 5. "Chapter Four Night of Nightmare" (第四章 悪夢の夜, "Dai Yon Shō Akumu no Yoru"); 6. "Chapter Five Stand-in's Death" (第五章 身代わりの死, "Dai Go Shō Migawari no Shi"); 7. "Chapter Six Truth" (第六章 真相, "Dai Rosshō Shinsō"); 8. "Epilogue" (エピローグ, "Epirōgu")
3	Computer Mountain Hut Murder Case; Dennō Sansō Satsujin Jiken (電脳山荘殺人事件)	April 15, 1996	978-4-06-324311-6
1. "Prologue" (プロローグ, "Purorōgu"); 2. "Chapter One Seven Screennames" (第一章 七つのハンドルネーム, "Dai Isshō Nanatsu no Handoru Nēmu"); 3. "Chapter Two Uninvited Guests" (第二章 招かれざる客, "Dai Ni Shō Manekarezaru Kyaku"); 4. "Chapter Three Trojan Horse" (第三章 トロイの木馬, "Dai San Shō Toroi no Mokuba"); 5. "Chapter Four Perfect Alibi" (第四章 完全なるアリバイ, "Dai Yon Shō Kanzen Naru Aribai"); 6. "Chapter Five Computer Dying Message" (第五章 電脳ダイイング・メッセージ, "Dai Go Shō Dennō Daiingu Messēji"); 7. "Chapter Six Truth" (第六章 真相, "Dai Rosshō Shinsō"); 8. "Epilogue" (エピローグ, "Epirōgu")
4	Ghost Fire Island Murder Case; Onibijima Satsujin Jiken (鬼火島殺人事件)	May 15, 1997	978-4-06-324320-8
1. "Prologue" (プロローグ, "Purorōgu"); 2. "Chapter One The Boy Being Connected With" (第一章 繋がれた少年, "Dai Isshō Tsunagareta Shōnen"); 3. "Chapter Two Evil Ghost in the Midnight" (第二章 午前零時の悪霊, "Dai Ni Shō Gozen Reiji no Akuryō"); 4. "Chapter Three Tragedy Inside the Keyhole" (第三章 鍵穴の奥の惨劇, "Dai San Shō Kagiana no Oku no Sangeki"); 5. "Chapter Four The Most Unforgiving……" (第四章 最も許しがたきは……, "Dai Yon Shō Mottomo Yurushigataki wa……"); 6. "Chapter Five Truth" (第五章 真相, "Dai Go Shō Shinsō"); 7. "Epilogue" (エピローグ, "Epirōgu")
5	Shanghai Mermaid Legend Murder Case; Shanhai Gyojin Densetsu Satsujin Jiken (上海魚人伝説殺人事件)	November 15, 1997	978-4-06-324324-6
1. "Prologue" (プロローグ, "Purorōgu"); 2. "Chapter One Young Kindaichi, Cross the Sea" (第一章 金田一少年、海を渡る, "Dai Isshō Kindaichi Shōnen, Umi o Wataru"); 3. "Chapter Two The Falling Body" (第二章 落ちてきた死体, "Dai Ni Shō Ochitekita Shitai"); 4. "Chapter Three Shanghai Chase" (第三章 上海チェイス, "Dai San Shō Shanhai Cheisu"); 5. "Chapter Four Autumn is Coming" (第四章 『秋』の訪れ, "Dai Yon Shō Aki no Otozure"); 6. "Chapter Five Truth" (第五章 真相, "Dai Go Shō Shinsō"); 7. "Epilogue" (エピローグ, "Epirōgu")
6	Thunder Festival Murder Case; Ikazuchi Matsuri Satsujin Jiken (雷祭殺人事件)	June 24, 1998	978-4-06-324329-1
1. "Episode One Thunder Festival Murder Case" (第一話 雷祭殺人事件, "Dai Ichi Wa Ikazuchi Matsuri Satsujin Jiken"); 1. "Chapter One The Girl in the Mirage" (第一章 陽炎の中の少女, "Dai Isshō Kagerō no Naka no Shōjo"); 2. "Chapter Two Footprint Revealed Suspect" (第二章 足跡が示す容疑者, "Dai Ni Shō Ashiato ga Shimesu Yōgisha"); 3. "Chapter Three Truth" (第三章 真相, "Dai San Shō Shinsō"); 4. "Epilogue" (エピローグ, "Epirōgu"); 2. "Episode Two Accomplice X" (第二話 共犯者X, "Dai Ni Wa Kyōhansha X"); 3. "Episode Three The Demon Who Comes After Losing His Way" (第三話 迷い込んできた悪魔, "Dai San Wa Mayoi Konde Kita Demon")
7	Murderous Deep Blue (First Part); Satsuriku no Dīpuburū (Jō) (殺戮のディープブルー（上）)	July 26, 1999	978-4-06-324336-9
1. "Prologue" (プロローグ, "Purorōgu"); 2. "Chapter One My Name is King Caesar" (第一章 我が名はキング・シーサー, "Dai Isshō Wa ga Na wa Kingu Shīsā"); 3. "Chapter Two The Horror of Orichalcum" (第二章 オリハルコンの恐怖, "Dai Ni Shō Oriharukon no Kyōfu"); 4. "Chapter Three Escape from Tiger's Mouth" (第三章 虎口からの脱出, "Dai San Shō Koguchi Kara no Dasshutsu"); 5. "Chapter Four Gunfight" (第四章 銃撃戦, "Dai Yon Shō Gekisen")
8	Murderous Deep Blue (Second Part); Satsuriku no Dīpuburū (Ge) (殺戮のディープブルー （下）)	July 26, 1999	978-4-06-324337-6
6. "Chapter Five Murderous Arms" (第五章 殺戮の紋章, "Dai Go Shō Satsuriku no Monshō"); 7. "Chapter Six The Killer in the Locked Room" (第六章 密室の殺戮者, "Dai Rosshō Misshitsu no Satsurikusha"); 8. "Chapter Seven The Message from Supt.Akechi" (第七章 明智警視からのメッセージ, "Dai Nana Shō Akechi Keishi Kara no Messēji"); 9. "Chapter Eight Cage of Annihilation" (第八章 殲滅の檻, "Dai Hasshō Senmetsu no Ori"); 10. "Chapter Nine Truth, And Then Collapse……" (第九章 真相、そして崩壊……, "Dai Kyū Shō Shinsō, Soshite Hōkai……"); 11. "Epilogue" (エピローグ, "Epirōgu")
9	Heresy Mansion Murder Case; Jashūkan Satsujin Jiken (邪宗館殺人事件)	April 20, 2001	978-4-06-324343-7
1. "Prologue Six Years Ago, The End of Summer" (プロローグ 『六年前、夏の終わり』, "Purorōgu Rokunen Mae Natsu no Owari"); 2. "Chapter One Four Geniuses" (第一章 四人の天才たち, "Dai Isshō Yonin no Tensai-tachi"); 3. "Chapter Two Heresy Mansion's Tragedy" (第二章 邪宗館の惨劇, "Dai Ni Shō Jashūkan no Sangeki"); 4. "Chapter Three Jashūmon Has an Alibi" (第三章 アリバイの邪宗門, "Dai San Shō Aribai no Jashūmon"); 5. "Chapter Four Truth" (第四章 真相, "Dai Yon Shō Shinsō"); 6. "Epilogue" (エピローグ, "Epirōgu")

== English translation ==
- Kodansha International, Kodansha English Library
  - The New Kindaichi Files (trans. Yuriko Tamaki, 1996, ISBN 4770022883) - Opera-za Kan Arata Naru Satsujin
  - The New Kindaichi Files 2: Murder On-Line (trans. Yuriko Tamaki, 1998, ISBN 4770023154) - Dennō Sansō Satsujin Jiken
  - The New Kindaichi Files 3: The Shanghai River Demon's Curse (trans. Yuriko Tamaki, 1998, ISBN 4770024096) - Shanhai Gyojin Densetsu Satsujin Jiken
- Kodansha International, Kodansha Ruby Books
  - The New Kindaichi Files: Deadly Thunder (trans. Yuriko Tamaki, 1999, ISBN 4770024479) - Ikazuchi Matsuri Satsujin Jiken

== See also ==
- List of The Kindaichi Case Files chapters
