= List of Detective School Q episodes =

Third DVD box set cover

Detective School Q is a Japanese anime television series based on the manga of the same name, written by Seimaru Amagi and illustrated by Fumiya Satō. Animated by Pierrot and directed by Noriyuki Abe, the series was broadcast for forty-five episodes on TBS from 15 April 2003 to 20 March 2004. The episodes were collected in twelve DVD sets, released by Marvelous Entertainment between 23 August 2003 and 24 July 2004. The series' first opening theme is "MeiQ!? – Meik Yū – MAKE★YOU" (迷Q!?-迷宮-MAKE★YOU), performed by Hayami Kishimoto; the second and third opening theme are "Luvly, Merry-Go-Round" and "100% Pure", respectively, both performed by Pipo Angels. The first ending theme is "Koigokoro" (恋ごころ; "My Love") performed by Akane Sugazaki; the second ending theme is "Nijiiro ni Hikari Umi" (虹色にひかる海; "The Rainbow-colored Sea") performed by Aiko Kitahara; the third and fourth ending theme are "Mienai Story" (みえないストーリー, Mienai Sutōrī; "Invisible Story") and "Kaze ni Mukai Aruku Youni" (風に向かい歩くように; "Like Walking towards the Wind"), respectively, both performed by Hayami Kishimoto.

== Episode list ==
No.	Title	Original air date
1	"Awaken! The Best Detective in the World!!"; Transliteration: "Mezase! Sekaiichi no Meitantei!!" (Japanese: 目指せ!世界一の名探偵!!)	15 April 2003
Kyuu, a mystery otaku, bumps into an old man at the market place, who mistakes him for stealing his money. Megu uses her photographic memory to get out of trouble and Kyu figures out where the missing money is. As a form of gratitude, the old man treats them and tells them that he is in a hurry as he needs to go to Hokkaido, where his daughter is getting married. Later, Kyu and Megu see a man on the rook of a building being constructed, waving a torch, and jumping. As they run there, Kinta joins them and they see the dead man is the old man they met before. Even as the police are about to conclude this as a suicide, Kyu tells them it can't be, since the old man wanted to go to Hokkaido. He starts searching for the only clue left behind by the culprit in the grounds, and is even joined by Kinta and Megu who help him out. After he solves the case almost single handedly, Kinta and Megu tell him about the Dan's Detective School/DDS and Katagiri hands them the guide to the enrollment program.
2	"A First Step to Dreams – The Entrance Exam Trap"; Transliteration: "Yume no Daiippo – Nyūgaku Shiken no Wana" (Japanese: 夢の第一歩·入学試験の罠)	22 April 2003
Kyuu, Megu, and Kinta enter the Entrance exam to DDS. A photograph is shown before it is declared that the test is to deduce and follow the culprit of a murder case, where the only clue is the photograph shown moments ago, which was taken by the victim. As Kyu, Megu and Kinta use their skills to deduce the culprit, and follow him to the second exam location, they are joined by Kazuma. Another hopeful, Saburōmaru, who knew Megu from Tokyo National Talent Development Research Center, follows them, thinking it is easier than deducing himself.
3	"Final Exam! The Stretched-Around Trap"; Transliteration: "Saishū Shiken! Harimegurasareta Wana" (Japanese: 最終試験!張り巡らされた罠)	29 April 2003
A few obstructions are met during the exam, which the group solves using the wits of Kauzuma. However due to the interference of Saburōmaru, the group is split up when a bridge breaks beneath them, with Kinta and Kazuma proceeding to the exam hall, and Kyu and Megu being swept away quite a distance by the river. As Kyu and Megu retrace their steps, they are halted by a cry of help, from a man who has fallen down the cliff and has broken his leg. Kyu deduces this to be a trap to stall examinees and they leave the man. But later, he hears a siren, signaling the release of water from the dam. Kyu returns to help the man, who in turn, encourages him to not give up until the end. Kyu enters the exam hall with 10 minutes to spare and declares that he wants to take the exam. In the end, Kyu is able to solve only one question. Even so, he is admitted to DDS, since Dan tells that the question was one of the most difficult cases encountered by himself, and only one more person has been able to solve it so far.
4	"An Intent to Kill at the School Entrance Ceremony! School Bomb Threat"; Transliteration: "Nyūgakushiki no Satsui! Gakuen Bakuha Yokoku" (Japanese: 入学式の殺意!学園爆破予告)	6 May 2003
Kyu, Megu, Kazuma and Kinta find themselves allocated to Q Class. Bent on revenge for failing the entrance exam, someone is threatening the school with bombs. They are caught, but a bomb detonates right where they are threatening Dan with another bomb, which is set to blow in another 10 minutes. Kyu and the gang decide to protect their dear school and Kyu deduces the location of the third bomb. Kyu and the rest are introduced to the building where their classes will be taken – it is the old building where Dan started his work as a detective.
5	"Crack the Code!? A Message from the Deceased"; Transliteration: "Angō Kaidoku!? Shisha no Messēji" (Japanese: 暗号解読!?死者のメッセージ)	13 May 2003
Kazuma is frustrated for being in Q Class, considering himself to be a better student. He requests Dan to join a case allotted to A Class, and Dan grants his wish, asking the whole of Q Class to join. The scene is of a murder, of Ootori, who has been murdered due to a pot thrown on his head from the floor above in his house. The only clue is a series of jumbled letters left on the victim's computer monitor. Kazuma uses a decoding software written by himself, but fails to decode the dying message. The group leaves for the day, without able to find any more clues. Finally, Kazuma, taking Kyu's advice, is able to solve the message and goes to the culprit. Unfortunately, the culprit tries to kill him, to hide the evidence, when he is finally rescued by the timely arrival of Kinta, Kyu and Megu. Kazuma finally realizes that he is in the right class.
6	"The Perfect 1000-Witness Alibi"; Transliteration: "Shōgensha Sen-nin Kanzen na Aribai" (Japanese: 証言者1000人完全なアリバイ)	20 May 2003
Kyu, Megu and Kinta are involved in a murder that takes place in a house. The victim has a sister who is an actress and a maid at the household. Since the actress has about 1000 witnesses who watched her performance when the murder took place, the obvious suspect is the maid. But Kinta has a solid instinct which tells him that it is the actress who is the murderer. With Kazuma's help, the group is able to solve the mystery behind the murder. It is revealed that the actress is in fact the murderer, as it turns out things had played out differently than the victim had intended. She had plotted to kill her actress sister and made several preparations: making several false accounts online and sending threatening messages to her, and setting up a fax trick to give herself an alibi. She then went to where her sister was performing and attempted to kill her, however the actress overpowered her and killed her instead. She then transported her body in her suitcase, and put on a performance to fool everyone into believing that her sister had died in their home. In the end, the actress is arrested and the maid thanks Kinta for proving her innocence.
7	"The Jigsaw-Puzzle Will"; Transliteration: "Jigusōpazuru no Yuigonjō" (Japanese: ジグソーパズルの遺言状)	27 May 2003
The group visits a friend of Katagiri, who is a splendid artist. It turns out that he too has the same ability as Megu, a photographic memory. Unfortunately, he is killed and the dying message is a 5000 piece solid white puzzle that only Megu can solve thanks to her photographic memory. The artist had put dozens of the puzzle pieces in his pocket as a dying message. When Megu pieces them back together they don't form anything, but Kyuu realizes that the true message lies with the other puzzle pieces. They bring in the suspects and present their deduction, Megu puts the puzzle back together minus the pieces that was in the artist's pocket. Kinta and Kazuma then spray paint the entire puzzle, Megu then breaks the puzzle apart once more revealing the murderer's portrait that the artist left behind. The murderer cornered reveals that he killed the artist because he in the past had hit the artist with his car and fled the scene. The artist never forgot his face due to his photographic memory and when he saw that man again, he called him to meet in private. The murderer took the opportunity to kill the artist as he was afraid that the artist was going to expose him. However, Katagiri reveals that the artist never held a grudge against him, he most likely just wanted to say that he was not angry about the whole thing because he was just that kind of person. Later on, Katagiri is given a painting that the artist drew which was of her revealing that he truly loved her leaving her in tears.
8	"The Pretty-Boy Detective! He Appears at Last!!"; Transliteration: "Ano Bishōnen Tantei! Tsui ni Toujou!!" (Japanese: あの美少年探偵!ついに登場!!)	3 June 2003
Q and A classes go to a field trip to Kirisaki Island along with Dan, Katagiri and Maki. They are also joined by a mysterious handsome boy. Once there, they begin classes – Dan tells them that they are there to solve the mystery of murders from about 50 years ago that happened in the island. The group finds that one of the three portraits in the main room, has been torn to half using one of the missing kitchen knives. Maki also tells them that the key to the rooftop store room is missing and he gets a duplicate. Later on, Dan describes the details of the murder and leads them to the room in the rooftop. As he describes the scene of a double-locked-room mystery, the group finds that Saburōmaru has been murdered, leaving only the left half of his body behind – is the island going to be haunted by another string of murders committed by a Jack the Ripper wannabe?
9	"Showdown! The Cutthroat Who Crossed Through Time!!"; Transliteration: "Taiketsu! Toki wo Koeta Satsujinki!!" (Japanese: 対決!時を越えた殺人鬼!!)	10 June 2003
Kyu discovers the key to the store room inside the room, making it a double-locked-room mystery. The classes are trapped there by a storm. Dan asks the students to help out with resolving the mystery. They find that the kitchen has been ransacked, and Kazuma finds something to form a theory to solve the double-locked-room mystery. Unfortunately this theory fails, but not before giving a clue to Ryu. Later that night, Kyu hears a knock on his door, and is joined by Kinta as they follow a trail of muddy shoe prints leading to a room where Shishido lays murdered, his body also split into parts.
10	"The Beautiful Boy Genius – Exposing the Perfect Mystery Room"; Transliteration: "Tensai Bishōnen – Kanzen Mitsushitsu wo Abaku" (Japanese: 天才美少年·完全密室を暴く)	17 June 2003
Two students are dead. All the victims have been Class A members. Megu questions the existence of another person in the island, since the only things taken from the kitchen were butter and flour – certainly nothing enough to feed a person and Dan concludes that the murderer is among them. Even as Kyu is remains bothered by the shoe prints, Ryu solves the mystery of the double locked door room. Kyu gets re-affirmation from Ryu that the shoe prints are suspicious as they are too clean. They are approached by Shiramine, who tells them that Gouda is missing and leads them to Dan. They all go outside, and find an open window on the 5th floor, with a bloody arm, which is pulled back into the window even as they are watching. Leaving Megu and Yukihira behind along with Maki, they all run to the 5th floor, to find muddy shoe prints again leading to a room where Gouda lays murdered, his body cut apart into more pieces. The group gets depressed thinking they are only waiting for their own deaths, when Kyu bucks up, remembering why he wanted to be a detective. This makes the group reconfirm their resolve, as they get together with Ryu to solve the murders.
11	"The Final Deciding Match! The Truth about Q Class!!"; Transliteration: "Saishū Kessen! Kyū Kurasu no Shinjitsu!!" (Japanese: 最終決戦!Qクラスの真実!!)	24 June 2003
Kyuu, Megu and Ryu team up and Kazuma and Kinta form another team. Each group finds their own clues and form their deductions. They then gather everybody and methodically lay out their explanations to solve the case and find the murderer. It is revealed that Dan-sensei had organized the "murders" himself and enlisted the students of Class A to help him. The "murdered" students of Class A are revealed to be alive as they pretended to be dead and acted as a body part of each murder. Dan reveals the secret behind the new class – Q Class – that they are not failures, but are the candidates for the succession of Dan's position in the school.
12	"A Curse Breaks Out!? The Séance Murder Case"; Transliteration: "Tatari Hassai!? Kōreijū Satsujin Jiken" (Japanese: たたり発生!?降霊術殺人事件)	1 July 2003
Kyuu's friend, Kaoru Ichinose, comes to seek help when a spirit medium mysteriously appears with a letter from her mother who died in a plane crash. The spirit medium had apparently successfully summoned the spirit of her deceased mother, but she is still skeptical and has Kyuu and his friends participate in the next seance. When they do, the spirit medium Asakura is murdered in the dark.
13	"Evil Spirit in the Locked Room! The Unstoppable Murders"; Transliteration: "Misshitsu no Akuryō! Tomara nai Satsujin" (Japanese: 密室の悪霊!止まらない殺人)	8 July 2003
The spirit medium's murder is much more complicated than anyone first thought especially when a second murder takes place and Kaoru is accused by a police detective of being the culprit. Luckily Ryuu proves her innocence, although he declares that it will be difficult to solve this case. When Kyuu suddenly declares that he has solved the case and has identified the culprit.
14	"An Announcement From the Spiritual World! The Forbidden Truth!!"; Transliteration: "Reikai ga Tsugeru! Kindan no Shinsō!!" (Japanese: 霊界が告げる!禁断の真相!!)	15 July 2003
Kyuu begins his deduction and immediately points out Kaoru's brothers as the culprits. As they had worked together to murder the spirit medium Asakura and their aunt because she had the misfortune of discovering the murderer's true identity and attempted to blackmail them. When the brothers refuse to confess to their crimes, Kyuu is forced to reveal the bitter and shocking truth: the spirit medium Asakura was in fact their mother. They don't believe this at first, but their mother's secretary confirms that it is all true. Leaving them shocked, they try to kill themselves but are stopped and arrested. Later, Kyuu finds Kaoru's mother's will and she tells Kyuu that she show this to her brothers and reconcile with them.
15	"30 Meters Underwater. The Case of the Underwater Locked Room Murder"; Transliteration: "Suishin San-Jū Mētoru Kaitei Misshitsu Satsujin Jiken" (Japanese: 水深30m 海底密室殺人事件)	22 July 2003
Class Q is on Vacation and a person is reported missing, so Class Q decides to help them find the missing person. They eventually find the person underwater in a sunken ship when they go scuba diving, during which someone nearly kills Megu. Class Q solves the case and reveals that one of the doctors was responsible for killing the missing person. They had killed him beforehand and had pretended to be diving with a buddy, but in reality it was the victim's corpse.
16	"Class Rivalry! Battle of the Vanishing Person"; Transliteration: "Kurasu Taikō! Ningen Shōjutsu Batoru" (Japanese: クラス対抗!人間消失バトル)	29 July 2003
Class A promises to defeat Class Q in the upcoming exams and replace the members of class Q and so Dan-sensei tells them to have the test at that moment. They are given the diorama of the murder and are supposed to solve it. Although Class A declares that they have figured out the trick, Kyuu beats them to the punch and solves it first. However, Dan-sensei is unable to decide who is the victor until the bell rings and he dismisses the class for the day. It is revealed that the Dan-sensei during the class was in fact Nanami Koutarou in disguise the entire time. The real Dan-sensei although angry at first, calms down and says that it has been decided. He decides to send Class Q to Kamikakushi village as 8 disappearances have occurred including the college student that the match was about. Class Q prepares themselves for one of their most toughest and shocking cases ever.
17	"Uncharted Waters that Lead to Death! The Legend of Spirited Away Village"; Transliteration: "Shini Itaru Hikyō! Kamikakushi Mura Densetsu" (Japanese: 死に至る秘境!神隠し村伝説)	5 August 2003
Class Q is sent to solve the mysterious murder of the college student and the other murders that have taken place in Kamikakushi Village. They arrive and meet a film crew who have come to find the supposed hidden treasure at kamikakushi village. When they ask to visit Kamikakushi village, they are told that they have to wear masks there as a result Ryu and Megu decide to go. However, it doesn't take long for a murder to take place.
18	"The Conclusive Moment! The Corpse that Disappears into the Sky"; Transliteration: "Ketteiteki Shunkan! Sora ni Kieru Shitai" (Japanese: 決定的瞬間!空に消える死体)	12 August 2003
A murder has taken place and the villagers believe that the gods of their village are responsible. A female member of the film crew is found dead and buried in a nearby cemetery, they find a clue she found which is apparently a drawing of the infinity symbol from the missing college student. However, after Ryu and Megu arrive at Kamikakushi village another member of the film crew is murdered. This time with video footage showing him being lifted into the air by an unknown force.
19	"The Revelation of Death! You're Next!!"; Transliteration: "Shino Otsuke! Tsugi wa Omae da!!" (Japanese: 死のお告げ!次はお前だ!!)	26 August 2003
Ryu and Megu deduce how the film member had been killed, they figure out that he had been lifted in the air by a trap set up by the murderer. They then meet the village priest who also wears a mask and only speaks with sign language, it is then that the leader of the film crew declares that he will uncover the village's secret and leaves. While Ryu boldly declares the village priest as the murderer, who allows him and Megu to stand by in a post outside the tunnel that connects the two villages. Meanwhile, Kyuu, Kinta, and Kazuma start their own investigation but learn that somehow the corpse of the college student who had been murdered in Kamikakushi village had ended up in the cemetery at Hyoutan village. While they are on the phone with Fuma Mio, the leader of the film crew is murdered in his sleep leaving Kyuu devastated and vowing to bring the murderer to justice.
20	"It Comes to Light! The Masked High Priest – Crimes and Lies!!"; Transliteration: "Hakkaku! Kamen no Kyōso – Sai to Uso!!" (Japanese: 発覚!仮面の教祖―罪と嘘!!)	2 September 2003
While they are investigating the newest murder, Kazuma finds an old document that he is trying to decode as it is related to the two villages. Eventually Kazuma manages to decode the document and learns a horrifying and shocking detail: Kamikakushi village was used by the japanese army, who built a lab there to experiment and modify the smallpox virus. Kyuu who is still trying to figure out the drawing of the Infinity symbol figures something out and calls Ryu on the phone. Together they manage to deduce the village's secret and decide to end this case. Class Q begin their deduction and first reveal how Kamikakushi village was used by the government to experiment with the smallpox virus. They then reveal that Fuma Mio the youngest resident of the two villages is the murderer and the village's priest. Mio denies this because she has a solid alibi, she was in one village when a murder occurred in the other and vice versa meaning it was impossible for her to commit the murders that occurred in both villages. However, Kyuu reveals that this alibi is no longer valid because he has figured out the truth of the village's big lie. Kinta arrives with a sledgehammer and starts to break down the wall of the village priest's residence. Once the wall is broken, the others are shocked by what they see.
21	"The Last Mysterious Disappearance! There's Only One Answer"; Transliteration: "Saigo no Kamikakushi! Kotae wa Hitotsu" (Japanese: 最後の神隠し!答えは一つ)	9 September 2003
The wall is broken down and on the other side of the wall is revealed to be Hyoutan village. All along the two villages used to be a large gourd shaped village that was spilt in two. The college student's drawing of the infinity sign was in fact a drawing of the original Hyoutan village, he had figured this out because he was using a compass. This also explains how Mio could commit the murders in the two villages, as all she had to do was walk through the door between the two villages. Ryu reveals that the original Kamikakushi village was erased from existence by the residents of Hyoutan village. When the government conducted their experiments with the smallpox, the virus leaked out of the facility and infected the residents of Kamikakushi village. As a result those of Hyoutan village sealed the tunnel and left them all to die. They decided to spilt Hyoutan village in two and make a new Kamikakushi village and kept guard over the wall that was in the middle of the "two" villages. Mio's grandfather was the original village priest and killed anyone who was close to or found out the secret of the two villages. Mio eventually took over for her grandfather after he passed away and started by killing the missing college student. Kyuu asks Mio to confess, however Mio pulls out a vial and claims that it contains the original smallpox virus and runs into a tunnel with Kinta and Kyuu following after her. They become separated with Kyuu eventually finding Mio, who explains that she had witnessed her grandfather burying his latest victim who explained to her that she had to protect the world from the smallpox virus no matter what. However, Kyuu denounces this stating that her grandfather and the other villagers did not want to protect the world but themselves because that was all they cared about. Kinta arrives and manages to incapacitate Mio and get the vial safely, and reunites with the others with the case finally concluded. Later on, Mio regains consciousness and is taken to the original Kamikakushi village where she learns that the other villagers did not all die. They also reveal that the vial she had did not contain the virus; it was empty all along. Some of the villagers survived and continued living for years on end, they hand Mio a diary from a surviving villager with Mio finally free from her torment.
22	"Dinner of the Dead"; Transliteration: "Shisha no Dinnā" (Japanese: 死者のディンナ一)	4 October 2003
Class Q are on a trip until they encounter another murder case. A famous chef has been found dead sitting at the table with a full course meal left in front of him. With four people who all found the body at the same time as suspects, this proves to be a tough case but both Ryu and Kyu manage to solve the case. It is revealed that one of the students was responsible, after he murdered the chef an unexpected incident occurred. There was a power outage which unfortunately ruined all food in fridge, if this was found then the police would've figured out his time of death. This led the culprit to prepare a full course meal from a recipe book written by the chef himself. However, this full course meal was missing one thing: salad, the culprit failed to prepare that because all the vegetables had gone bad and could not be served fresh.
23	"Train Alibi"; Transliteration: "Aribai Ressha" (Japanese: アリバ列車)	11 October 2003
Kyuu and Kinta are on their way to a fishing trip. Traveling in a train, they meet a famous story writer but they're unaware that she is scheming to murder her ex-boyfriend. Kyuu reveals that this story writer is actually his favorite as he read her books when he was just a child. The woman gets off the train at a station and confronts her ex-boyfriend who she stabs and drives back to a different station and barely makes it back on. It is then that Kyuu and Kinta receive a call from Dan-sensei who tells them that an attempted murder took place and sends them a photo, who turns out to be the same man that the writer had a photo of. Kyuu realizes that she is the murderer and tricks her into revealing her own guilt. As evidence, they reveal that her drawing was contradictory as it showed a red sun shining on a bear with its shadow facing the sun instead of facing away from the sun. Meaning that the red sun was in fact a blood drop from the victim and the rest is on the envelope proving her guilt. She reveals that her ex-boyfriend dumped her after leading her on and she considered killing herself, but decided to kill him instead. In the end, Kyuu tells her that she should try to make children smile through her writing as she did for him and she thanks him for his kind words.
24	"The Cursed Idol"; Transliteration: "Noroi no Aidoru" (Japanese: 呪いのアイドル)	18 October 2003
Kyuu gets interested in one of the cases sent to DDS, about a mysterious death of an idol, and uses his vacation time to investigate. Once there, he unexpectedly stumbles upon Sakurako Yukihira of the A-class, who challenges him to a deductive duel in this case. They both start their own investigations and learn that an idol died a few months ago from a terrible accident and many still believed that her ghost lingers. Kyuu meets the sister of the recently deceased idol and confides in him, her fears of the ghost of the dead idol coming back to haunt them. Later on, when Kyuu and Yukihira check on her through her window they see her lying motionless and break the door down and manage to barely save her life. Yukihira believes that she has figured out the truth, however her deduction proves to be incorrect when she demonstrates her theory and it fails. Later, when Yukihira is looking for evidence in a dumpster she is knocked unconscious and kidnapped by an unknown assailant.
25	"An Old Enemy! Pluto"; Transliteration: "Shukuteki! Meiousei" (Japanese: 宿敵!冥王星)	25 October 2003
Yukihara is kidnapped by an unknown assailant forcing Kyuu to find her. Yukihira manages to lead Kyuu to her location by dropping clues behind, and Kyuu successfully alerts Class Q and finds her. Together they manage to save her and later on after receiving a call from Dan-sensei, Kyuu reveals that he has solved the case and prepare to present his deduction. During the night the killer enters the hospital room of the idol Kyuu and Yukihira had saved, but it is revealed to be a trap set up by Class Q. Kyuu reveals that the killer is the idol's manager and reveals the method to that he used to attempt to kill both of the idol sisters. He tells everyone how the manager had used a large promotion balloon and had put it through the window of the sister's rooms and inflated it after he had pushed it all through. Because of the size of the room, the balloon ending up filling the whole room causing the two sisters to be trapped underneath the balloon unable to move. However, when he tried to kill the second sister the murder attempt failed because the idol had left her light on due to her being frightened. The light had burned a hole in the balloon which ultimately saved her life. The manager reveals that he had tried to kill the two sisters because they had killed the idol who died a few months ago. He and that idol had been secretly dating, but one night when she was bathing in the outdoor bath he heard her scream and saw that she had fallen down the cliff. He too initially believed that she had died from a terrible accident, but one night when he was stumbling around from drinking he heard the two sisters talking about how they had killed her. They had tried to scare her by dressing up as ghosts, but it worked too well and she ended up falling to her death. Hearing this he became enraged and vowed to kill them, suddenly one of the other idols grabs a knife and stabs the manager in the back. She comes to and is shocked by her actions as she does not know why she just did that. As the manager is fighting for his life, one of the idols is revealed to be a Pluto agent in disguise who is confronted by Nanami Koutarou (Dan-sensei's right hand man). Although he manages to stop her, she manages to escape thanks to the help of an accomplice. The manager while in surgery has a dream of meeting his lover who tells him to forgive them and that this is not what she wanted. The manager after making it through surgery, tells Kyuu that he no longer feels any resentment toward the two sisters. Ryuu asks the manager how he came up with the murder plan and reveals that he was given this plan by someone he met at a restaurant, leaving Class Q to wonder who they are dealing with.
26	"Megumi is Being Targeted"; Transliteration: "Nerawareta Megumi" (Japanese: 狙われたメグ)	1 November 2003
Megu, prompted by her sister, invites her classmates to her house for dinner though she actually wants to see her 'two princes.' Kyu, Kinta, Kazuma, and Saburomaru all tag along to meet her older sister, once they arrive Megu has trouble opening her door. Which causes them to realize that someone had most likely tampered with the keyhole in her door, meaning someone had broken into her apartment. They search her apartment and it seems that no one else is around, however as it turns out the intruder is hiding in a closet near the door. The intruder attempts to escape after believing he had outwitted them, but unfortunately for him Kyu had already deduced his location and promptly restrain and turn him over to the police. Later on, the culprit escapes revealing themselves to be a pluto agent in disguise.
27	"The Lost Dragon"; Transliteration: "Kieta Dragon" (Japanese: 消えたドラゴン)	8 November 2003
A new teacher, Tatsumi Hongōu, is assigned to teach class Q. While cleaning their building in place of Kinta, Megu and Kyuu discover a hidden door, and go exploring.
28	"SOS From The Underground Prison"; Transliteration: "Chika Rōgoku Esu Ō Esu" (Japanese: 地下牢獄SOS)	15 November 2003
Kinta, Ryuu and Kazuma realize that Megu and Kyuu have gone missing, and start a desperate search in DDS for them.
29	"Collector of Killers"; Transliteration: "Satsujin Collector" (Japanese: 殺人コレクター)	23 November 2003
Meg and Ryu are sent to an elite school to find out about the mysterious disappearances and also about the one who calls himself "the Collector", who puts videos of the murders of students on the net.
30	"Broadcast of the Campus of Death"; Transliteration: "Shi no Kōnai Hōsō" (Japanese: 死の校内放送)	29 November 2003
Meg is kidnapped, a student is killed, and the recording of the video is on the net.
31	"Tragic on the Net"; Transliteration: "Netto no Hibiki" (Japanese: ネットの悲劇)	6 December 2003
Ryu and Megu along with the other members of class Q start their deduction and accuse one of the students of murder. The culprit had been fooled into incriminating himself as class Q had set a trap for him, which involved him attempting to poison Ryu to stop him from revealing who the culprit is. The murderer faced with all the evidence confesses stating that he had dated Ogura Emina, the female student who had gone missing not too long ago. He had dated her online and figured out who she was, as her username was her last name spelled backwards: Anime. But one day she started receiving hate messages from several people, he tried in vain to help her until she wrote a message stating that she will kill herself and disappeared from both the net and the real world. Eventually he figured out that one of his classmates was responsible, he had created several fake accounts and sent hate messages to Anime due to him being jealous of Emina for her being the top student instead of him. Suddenly, Tooya Kuniko a female classmate says that he had misunderstood everything. She reveals that she was Anime all along, the culprit at first doesn't believe her but when she recalls their conversations on the net he realizes that it is all true. Kuniko reveals that she posed as Emina because she admired the real one and wanted to be like her, which is why she posed as her online. But when she started receiving hate messages she decided to kill the virtual Emina, but coincidentally the real Ogura Emina went missing. The culprit shocked by this loses control, realizing that everything he did was for the wrong person. Later, Dan-sensei reveals that the real Ogura Emina is alive and well. She had heard about this case from the news and contacted them, it turns out that she had run away and eloped with her boyfriend because her parents disapproved of their relationship.
32	"The Beauties Detective Squad"; Transliteration: "Bishōjo Tanteidan" (Japanese: 美少女探偵団)	13 December 2003
Megu, Yukihara, and the newcomer Kuniko Touya are sent to help Kyuu and Kinta after they're mistaken as peepers during their case, but the three girls stumble upon another case. Kuniko while riding on the train with the others is molested by an unknown man, Megu and Yukihara attempt to apprehend him and nearly let him get away. The man is brought into the train station office to be interrogated and he nearly talks his way out. But luckily Megu, Yukihara, and Kuniko manage to prove his guilt. He tries to escape but Kuniko stops him with her martial arts, revealing herself to be an Aikido master.
33	"Mystery of the Home Economics Classroom"; Transliteration: "Kateika Shitsu no Nazo" (Japanese: 家庭科室の謎)	20 December 2003
Kazuma's elementary school is missing a 'cursed' blow dart and a sample of curare. A teacher is shot by a blowdart from a sealed room.
34	"The Curse that Disappeared"; Transliteration: "Kieta Noroi" (Japanese: 消えた呪い)	27 December 2003
With everyone's help, Kazuma discovers the perpetrator's identity and decides to confront the latter. The culprit is revealed to be the teacher who was shot with the poisoned dart, she had set things up in a way so that she would be shot with a poisoned dart when certain conditions were met. Kazuma asks why his favorite teacher would do such a thing, she reveals that she did this for her child. Her husband passed away from an accident not too long ago and the shock of that caused her to go into labor prematurely. Her baby's chances of survival were slim at best and in order to save her she needed to have surgery, but the price for it was astronomical. Which is why she did all this hoping to get some money from her insurance company to pay for the surgery. She asks him to look the other way for her and Kazuma becomes torn on what to do. But in the end he decides to do the right thing and calls the police, and has a police detective sneak in a winning lottery ticket to help her pay for her child's surgery.
35	"Bomb of the Terrifying Gem"; Transliteration: "Kyofu no Hōseki Bakudan" (Japanese: 恐怖の宝石爆弾)	10 January 2004
A madman has been planting bombs in three different locations. He claims that he can talk to the God of gems. DDS set out and manage to find the man responsible, but learn that he has already planted the fourth bomb. Kyuu and his friends are able to figure out where the bomb was planted, but they were unable to find it. With only 5 minutes remaining until the bomb explodes, will Class Q find the bomb in time before it explodes?
36	"The Murder Case of the Illusionary House"; Transliteration: "Gensōkan Satsujin Jiken" (Japanese: 幻奏館殺人事件)	17 January 2004
Class Q are sent to investigate the threat sent to a violin teacher. But as soon as they arrive, a murder takes place.
37	"Rhythm of the Death God"; Transliteration: "Shinigami no Senritsu" (Japanese: 死神の旋律)	24 January 2004
A second murder has Ryu looking like a suspect. Will the serial killer ever be found?
38	"Homicide Concert"; Transliteration: "Satsujin Kyōsōkyoku" (Japanese: 殺人協奏曲)	31 January 2004
The murderer has been revealed and the secrets come to the light. However, even after the truth has been said, there will be one more tragedy of the night...
39	"The Death March of Friendship"; Transliteration: "Yūjō no Kesshikō" (Japanese: 友情の決死行)	7 February 2004
Kinta takes Ryu to the hospital after the failed murder attempt on Kyuu by a PLUTO agent.
40	"Duel! The Headless Woman"; Transliteration: "Taiketsu! Kubinashi onna" (Japanese: 対決!首なし女)	14 February 2004
Ryu, Kyuu, and Kyuu's mother go to the third street where The Headless Woman wanders, can they find the truth or face their death...
41	"Murder Case of the Maya Princess"; Transliteration: "Maya Hime Satsujin Jiken" (Japanese: 魔矢姫殺人事件)	21 February 2004
Class Q is summoned to Jinchu village at the request of a well known politician Takatobi because he had received a blackmail letter. However when they arrive it is clear that the Takatobi is not well liked as well as the fact that the whole village is practically a ghost town. It is revealed that the reason why the village was mostly deserted was because Takatobi and his business partner Hisashi Gora plan to build a dam and drown the entire village. To that end Takatobi compensated all the villagers, but they do not approve of this as Jinchu village is their home. When Class Q arrive at the construction site, they spot a small concrete warehouse and notice immediately that a fire had occurred on the inside. They break down the door and find it blocked with a large cube made of concrete, and further in they find the charred remains of the politician Takatobi. A detective Kazushi Mine arrives and rejects Class Q's help as he believes he can solve this case without their help. Detective Mine immediately rules Takatobi's death as a suicide as no one in the entire world has the strength to lift a concrete block, meaning Takatobi must have moved the concrete block on his own using a contraption of some sort. When Class Q are taking a bath, Kyu and Kinta peek on Megu and end up getting beaten to near death. Meanwhile a sinister presence lurks near Hisashi making him their next target.
42	"Village of the Traitor"; Transliteration: "Uragirimono no Sato" (Japanese: 裏切り者の里)	28 February 2004
The unknown murderer strikes Hisashi on the head knocking him unconscious. The killer quickly hides after hearing Kyu, Kinta, and Megu arguing about the peeping incident. When they are finally gone, the killer strikes Hisashi on the head once again. The next day when Kyu and Kinta are examining their wounds, Yuri Hitsuki walks in and laughs together with Megu after seeing their injured faces. Suddenly the innkeeper screams, Class Q checks to see what's wrong and find Hisashi's body stuffed into a fireplace. Detective Mine after arriving declares that he has figured out the trick used for the locked room murder. But when he attempts to demonstrate his theory it fails, however it helps Kyu and Ryuu to figure out the trick that was used to seal the room after the murder was committed. Meanwhile, Kinta saves Hitsuki from Musashi after he attempted to attack her with a stick. Hitsuki reveals that she had been dating Yamato, Musashi's older brother who died not too long ago. Yamato had been protesting against Takatobi for trying to drown their entire village. Hitsuki reveals that she started working for Takatobi to try and persuade him into stopping the construction of the dam, but learned that he only planned this project for the profit he would gain. Meanwhile, Ryuu and Kazuma manage to figure out that Hisashi with his last breath left a dying message. They manage to piece the message together and learn the culprit's name. Class Q have finally pieced together the entire case and decide to end this once and for all.
43	"Ryu's Determination"; Transliteration: "Ryu no Ketsui" (Japanese: リュウの決意)	6 March 2004
Class Q begin their deduction and tells the others about the peeping incident and how it helped them figure out who the culprit was. They reveal the killer to be Hitsuki Yuri, she had overheard them talking about the peeping incident while hiding in Hisashi's room after bludgeoning him. She gave herself away when she laughed at Kyu and Kinta, because normally one would assume that they got into some sort of fight like the others did, but instead she laughed at them because she knew what really happened even though no one else didn't. They then reveal the dying message left behind by Hisashi, it was the stack of documents that was found scattered in his room. As it turns out Hisashi had written the name of the culprit on the side of the documents and purposefully scattered them onto to the floor so that the message wouldn't be destroyed by the killer. When the documents are stacked together the name Hitsuki is revealed. However Hitsuki claims that she and Hisashi were lovers so it wasn't strange that the two were in the same room. She also claims that the locked room murder is impossible to solve, therefore she couldn't be the killer. However Kyu reveals that he has already figured out the trick, he reveals that after killing Takatobi she shut the door of the concrete warehouse while pulling a cardboard box behind it. Then using a hose, she filled the box with quick drying cement and waited for it to harden and started a fire to get rid of the cardboard box. Faced with this evidence, Hitsuki confesses and reveals that her motive was that Takatobi and Hisashi had killed Yamato because they were annoyed by him constantly protesting against their dam project. She had joined them to find proof of their wrongdoings, but instead she had overheard them talking about how they had killed Yamato. It was then that she decided to kill them for their greed and for what they did to Yamato. When Hitsuki is handcuffed she suddenly goes berserk and grabs a knife and nearly kills Kinta but is luckily restrained. One of the people there runs off revealing themself to be a Pluto agent. Ryuu talks to his caretaker in private and denounces his affiliation with Pluto and leaves, forcing them to launch their next plan into action.
44	"Dan Morihiko, Kidnapped!"; Transliteration: "Dan Morihiko, Yūkai!" (Japanese: 団守彦、誘拐!)	13 March 2004
Dan-sensei visits his best friend and comrade, Satoru Renjo, Kyuu's father. On their way back men with rifles anmbush and kidnap him. The culprits call for a ransom at an appointed time or else the bomb on Dan-Sensei will go off. Will the detectives be able to rescue Dan-sensei or give into the culprits' demands?
45	"The Future Detective"; Transliteration: "Mirai no Meitantei" (Japanese: 未来の名探偵)	20 March 2004
The battle of DDS and Pluto have finally come, will Ryu escape his destined fate and will Kyu find out his past? The final battle had come to an end. There's only ONE answer!!
