= Yōzaburō Kanari =

Japanese manga story writer

- Born: 20 August 1965 (age 61); Sagamihara, Kanagawa, Japan
- Occupation: Manga story writer
- Known for: Kindaichi Case Files

Yōzaburō Kanari (金成 陽三郎, Kanari Yōzaburō) (born 20 August 1965 in Sagamihara, Kanagawa) is a Japanese manga story writer, best known for co-creating, with Seimaru Amagi and Fumiya Sato, the Kindaichi Case Files series.

He made his debut in 1991 with manga Chōzunō Silver Wolf (illustrated by Masashi Asaki).

== Works ==
- Chōzunō Silver Wolf (debut work)
- Gimmick!
- Kindaichi Case Files (with Seimaru Amagi and Fumiya Satō)
- Mystery Minzokugakusha Yakumo Itsuki
