= List of The Knight in the Area volumes =

The Knight in the Area (エリアの騎士, Eria no Kishi) is a Japanese manga series written by Hiroaki Igano and illustrated by Kaya Tsukiyama. The series is serialized in Weekly Shōnen Magazine beginning in 2006 and is currently ongoing. The story follows Kakeru Aizawa, who received the heart of his soccer prodigy older brother Suguru Aizawa after an accident, as he aims to achieve his brother's dream of winning the World Cup.

== Volume list ==
=== Volumes 1–20 ===
No.	Japanese release date	Japanese ISBN
1	August 17, 2006	978-4-06-363712-0
2	September 15, 2006	978-4-06-363725-0
3	November 17, 2006	978-4-06-363749-6
4	February 16, 2007	978-4-06-363794-6
5	April 17, 2007	978-4-06-363819-6
6	June 15, 2007	978-4-06-363842-4
7	September 14, 2007	978-4-06-363888-2
8	November 16, 2007	978-4-06-363912-4
9	February 18, 2008	978-4-06-363950-6
10	April 17, 2008	978-4-06-363972-8
11	June 17, 2008	978-4-06-384001-8
12	August 12, 2008	978-4-06-384022-3
13	November 17, 2008	978-4-06-384063-6
14	February 17, 2009	978-4-06-384085-8
15	April 17, 2009	978-4-06-384122-0
16	June 17, 2009	978-4-06-384146-6
17	August 17, 2009	978-4-06-384171-8
18	November 17, 2009	978-4-06-384209-8
19	February 17, 2010	978-4-06-384247-0
20	April 16, 2010	978-4-06-384281-4

=== Volumes 21–40 ===
No.	Japanese release date	Japanese ISBN
21	June 17, 2010	978-4-06-384312-5
22	September 17, 2010	978-4-06-384362-0
23	December 17, 2010	978-4-06-384417-7
24	February 17, 2011	978-4-06-384444-3
25	April 15, 2011	978-4-06-384474-0
26	June 17, 2011	978-4-06-384504-4
27	September 16, 2011	978-4-06-384551-8
28	November 17, 2011	978-4-06-384579-2
29	January 17, 2012	978-4-06-384613-3
30	March 16, 2012	978-4-06-384642-3
31	June 15, 2012	978-4-06-384687-4
32	August 17, 2012	978-4-06-384731-4
33	October 17, 2012	978-4-06-384747-5
34	December 17, 2012	978-4-06-384793-2
35	March 15, 2013	978-4-06-384826-7
36	May 17, 2013	978-4-06-384863-2
37	August 16, 2013	978-4-06-394909-4
38	October 17, 2013	978-4-06-394942-1
39	January 17, 2014	978-4-06-394983-4
40	March 17, 2014	978-4-06-395024-3

=== Volumes 41–current ===
No.	Japanese release date	Japanese ISBN
41	June 17, 2014	978-4-06-395078-6
42	September 17, 2014	978-4-06-395188-2
43	November 17, 2014	978-4-06-395243-8
44	January 17, 2015	978-4-06-395289-6
45	March 17, 2015	978-4-06-395345-9
46	May 15, 2015	978-4-06-395401-2
47	July 17, 2015	978-4-06-395437-1
48	October 16, 2015	978-4-06-395488-3
49	December 17, 2015	978-4-06-395560-6
50	February 17, 2016	978-4-06-395603-0
51	April 15, 2016	978-4-06-395652-8
52	June 17, 2016	978-4-06-395688-7
