= Koigokoro (Akane Sugazaki song) =

2003 single by Akane Sugazaki

Single by Akane Sugazaki

from the album Beginning
- B-side: "Boyfriend"
- Released: May 28, 2003
- Genre: J-pop; anime song
- Length: 3:55
- Label: Giza Studio
- Songwriter(s): Aika Ohno; Akane Sugazaki
- Producer(s): Kannonji

Akane Sugazaki singles chronology
"Kimi no Namae Yobu dakede" (2002)	"Koigokoro" (2003)

"Koigokoro" (恋ごころ, lit. "My Love") is a song by Japanese singer Akane Sugazaki. It was released on 28 May 2003 through Giza Studio, as the third single from her debut studio album Beginning (2003). The song reached number thirty-eight in Japan and has sold over 7,389 copies nationwide. The song served as the theme song to the Japanese anime television series, Detective School Q.

== Track listing ==
CD single
No.	Title	Writer(s)	Arranger(s)	Length
1.	"Koigokoro"	Aika Ohno; Akane Sugazaki	Satoru Kobayashi	3:55
2.	"Boyfriend"	Hitoshi Okamoto; Sugazaki	Yoshinobu Ohga	3:46
3.	"Koigokoro" (Instrumental)	Ohno; Sugazaki	Kobayashi	3:54

== Charts ==
Chart (2003)	Peak position
Japan (Oricon)	38

== Personnel ==
- Akane Sugazaki – vocals (M-1,2,3)
- Aika Ohno – backing vocals (M-1,3)
- Keiko Masuda – backing vocals (M-2)
- Yoshinobu Ohga – acoustic guitar, electric guitar (M-1,2,3), production, programming (M-2)
- Satoru Kobayashi – production, programming (M-1,3)
- Katsuo Urano – recording engineering (M-1,2,3)
- Akio Nakajima – mixing (M-1,2,3)
- Masahiro Shimada – mastering (M-1,2,3)

== Certification and sales ==
Region	Certification	Certified units/sales
Japan (RIAJ)	None	7,389

== Release history ==
Region	Date	Format	Catalogue Num.	Label	Ref.
Japan	28 May 2003	CD	GZCA-7014	Giza Studio	
