= Psycho Busters =

Japanese light novel series

- Psycho Busters Volume 1 Cover

サイコバスターズ (Saiko Basutāzu)
- Light novel
- Written by: Yuya Aoki
- Illustrated by: Rando Ayamine
- Published by: Kodansha
- English publisher: NA: Del Rey
- Original run: 2004 – 2005
- Volumes: 3
- Manga
- Written by: Yuya Aoki
- Illustrated by: Akinari Nao
- Published by: Kodansha
- English publisher: NA: Del Rey
- Magazine: Magazine Special
- Original run: 2006 – 2008
- Volumes: 7

Psycho Busters (Japanese: サイコバスターズ, Hepburn: Saiko Basutāzu) is a light novel series written by Yuya Aoki and drawn by Rando Ayamine. It was published by Kodansha in Japan and is licensed by Del Rey in the United States.

== Plot ==
The story follows the life of Kakeru, while wishing for something a little more exciting to happen in his life, inadvertently receives it when he crosses paths with a group of gifted youths, Fujimura Ayano, Bai Xiao Long (Shaoron in the Japanese version), and Toma Joi (who is hidden at the time) in an abandoned building and claim to need his help. The group is ambushed by the "Greenhouse" (the organization from which the Psychics escaped from) and Kakeru is almost shot dead but is saved by an amazing stroke of luck.

Kakeru temporarily allows the Psychics to stay at his house before seeking aid from one of his teachers, Hiyama Akira. Joi is left under Hiyama's care while the rest of the group searches for Kaito, another Psychic whom escaped from the Greenhouse. The initial attempts to recruit him fail and Kakeru separates from the group for a while. Kakeru is attacked by Kasuga Maya and is nearly killed by her illusions, but is saved by another stroke of luck. When Kakeru gets back to the group he finds them bloodied and beaten and is attacked by Sho. Kaito arrives and saves Kakeru and the two work together to defeat Sho afterwards Kaito decides to rejoin with everyone.

Joi reawakens from his "Psychic Hibernation" and shows the group a horrifying future in which everything is virtually destroyed and the group is nearly dead with Ikushima standing in front of them laughing. The group goes to a horse race track and Joi is able to provide funding for the group's operations. Upon returning to the school the group is given numerous jobs from Joi. While doing his job Kakeru hears the screams of his classmates of whom he saw earlier and when he finds them he sees that they all have been attacked and badly wounded. Ayano appears and she and Kakeru are attacked by Hidaka Takemaru. Ayano warns Kakeru to run away but instead he rushes to protect her and is severely wounded by Takemaru's projectiles. The two are saved by the interventions of Xiao Long and Kaito and Kakeru is healed.

Soon after, however, the school is surrounded by the Greenhouse and becomes a battlefield. Kakeru is separated from the group and is attacked by Takemaru again. Kakeru attempts to bluff his way out like he did in previous encounters with Maya and Sho, however, this fails to frighten Takemaru. Kakeru instead tries to insult Takemaru's power and how he is being used, but this only causes Takemaru to kill one of Kakeru's classmates in front of him. Angered by Takemaru's ruthless murder Kakeru's power awakens and time begins to rewind. Kakeru unaware of what happened is back to when Takemaru killed the student, instead, however, much to Kakeru's surprise the student is replaced with a cat and one of the lights falls down on Takemaru. Saved numerous times from Takemaru by luck the gym soon begins to fall apart and nearly kills both Psychics. Takemaru awakens to find out he was saved by Kakeru and he then leaves the Greenhouse and becomes friends with Kakeru.

== Categories ==
The abilities of the Psychics are referred to as either Wild Types or Cultivated Types. Wild types naturally have powers whereas Cultivated types' powers are awakened due to drugs and experimentation. These groups are then further divided down into categories, which indicate the level of power behind their abilities. Category 4 is the lowest level while Category 1 is the highest. There is also a "Category 0", which refers to a level beyond that of all the rest, and so far, the only examples of Psychics who are Category 0 are Chronodivers, Psychics who have the ability to stop and reverse time and change the past.

== Characters ==
Kakeru Hase (馳 翔, Hase Kakeru)
In his final year in middle school, Kakeru feels his life is a little mediocre. That is until he meets the other Psychics and has his life changed drastically. Kakeru's has a power known as, Chronodiving (though he is initially ignorant of it), so he is commonly referred to as a Category 0, the Chronodiver. Chronodiving allows him to jump through time. But, each time he goes back in time he causes a rift in time. His abilities are not explained until the 4th volume, where Takemaru proposes that Kakeru could turn back time. He seems to really care for his friends even risking his own life to save them especially Ayano. He is in love with Ayano and has tried to ask her out, but she refused due to her misunderstanding of the term going out (Maya tells her going out means doing ecchi things).
Joi Touma (当真 条威, Tōma Jōi)
The leader of the group, his power is that of Clairvoyance, the ability to see the future. He wishes to prevent a vision he saw showing the end of the world. It seems as though the use of this power takes a great toll on his energy levels, causing him to go into hibernation after major usage of his ability.
It is revealed that he and Ikushima are more closely related than anybody has thought.
Ayano Fujimura (藤邑 綾乃, Fujimura Ayano)
The only girl in the group, her abilities include Telepathy and Astral Projection, which together allow her to temporarily possess someone. She wishes to experience life like a normal girl would and attend school, which she's never done before. It seems that she develops feelings for Kakeru when she gets so irritated and jealous seeing Kakeru so close with a girl but she doesn't realize what she is feeling. Later on she realizes that she really is in love with Kakeru. In chapter 20, she accepts Kakeru's confession.
Xiao Long Bai (伯 小龍, Bai Shaoron)
Xiao Long is the smallest of the group. His abilities include Healing and Qigong. Qigong is actually a Chinese breathing exercise, but it is commonly perceived as a way to channel one's "qi" (also known as "chi" and "ki") into an active force (e.g. Palm blasts) in pop-culture. He blames himself for his parents' death for they died arguing over the money they had charged people to have Xiao Long heal them.
Kaito Himuro (火室 海人, Himuro Kaito)
The group's "tough guy", although he cares a great deal for his friends. Kaito's power is Pyrokinesis. He has a tendency to get slightly carried away.
Akira Hiyama (灯山 晶, Hiyama Akira)
A teacher at Kakeru's middle school, she temporarily looks after Joi while he recovers and uses the school as a safe house for the group.
Later, she is also revealed to be an agent, codenamed "Izanami" (イザナミ), of a secret government agency known as "Crimers" (クライマーズ, Kuraimāzu).
Arata Ikushima (生島 荒太, Ikushima Arata)
A first level manager of the Greenhouse. His powers are Clairvoyance, as well as the ability to create false futures (which can conflict with Joi's powers), and inflicting rapid cell growth, which turns the opponent into an aged body within seconds. He has been given the job of retrieving Joi at all costs, even if it means killing the other Psychics. He was the cause of the apocalypse in Joi's vision.
Maya Kasuga (春日 麻耶, Kasuga Maya)
A Psychic working with the Greenhouse to retrieve Joi. Her power is Illusion. Her power is significant in that the illusions can harm those trapped within them. In volume 4, she disguised herself as a high school girl pretending to have crush on Kakeru, however, she eventually falls in love with him for real and reveals herself as Maya only to Kakeru.
Shou Amamiya (天宮 将, Amamiya Shō)
A Psychic also working with the Greenhouse to retrieve Joi. His power is Teleportation. He uses throwing knives as weapons. In the Japanese version, he speaks in a combination of Japanese and English.
Takemaru Hidaka (飛鷹 猛丸, Hidaka Takemaru)
Extremely powerful, Takemaru's power is Psychokinesis. He is well known for being unstable and violent. He used to be bullied constantly when he was young because he was short while his name was fierce. He caused the deaths of three bullies after they burnt his eye. He uses his power to levitate pencils and use them as projectiles which are as powerful as bullets. After Kakeru saved him when the school gym collapsed and offered to become his friend in volume 2, Takemaru "disappeared" then turned up again in volume 4 of the manga to save Kakeru from an attack from the Greenhouse.
Jun Todoroki (百々路樹 潤, Todoroki Jun)
Another Category 0. He is a clone of Kakeru. Like Kakeru, he has the power to stop time and change the past. Due to his power having awakened much earlier than Kakeru's had, he has much better control of his power than Kakeru and is therefore more skilled of the two. In fact, at first, he seemed to be immune to Kakeru's time-stopping power.
His hatred towards society and especially Kakeru, as well as his adoration for Ikushima, which grew out of his gratitude for Ikushima being the first person to acknowledge his existence was the cause of his murder, by Ikushima's hands.
Fuyuko Isshiki (一色 冬子, Isshiki Fuyuko)
She has the ability to call supernatural beings, Gigantes, from the dead. These beings can be massive, but are vulnerable against Xiao Long's qigong.
Tomoe Ikushima (生島 智恵, Ikushima Tomoe)
Arata Ikushima's daughter. She died in an accident on the bus seat next to Kakeru. However, Kakeru has no recollection of her, nor of the accident. She appears in the Tower of Time teaching Kakeru about his powers.
Saki Himuro (火室 咲貴, Himuro Saki)
Kaito's younger sister, who appears to be blind and wears a kimono in the Tower of Time. She died to protect Kaito when he was badly beaten by a group of people.

== Reception ==
=== Light novel reception ===
Carl Kimlinger from Anime News Network noted Psycho Buster novel "isn't difficult or complicated by any stretch of the imagination" since it consists in "characters of the simplest types, and is structured as a straightforward adventure", saying due to this the "manga-like quality of the story is inescapable". Kimlinger described it as "easy to read, light in tone, rich in adventure and is peppered with properly outlandish illustrations". Writing for Active Anime, Holly Ellingwood called the illustrations "gritty and edgier", and said "it's action packed intrigue, super powered teens and an ensemble of compelling characters". Ellingwood qualified it as "an impressive sci-fi action series", adding the conclusion to the series is "a stunner!" About the first volume, Comic Book Bin's Leroy Douresseaux stated "the story is actually entertaining" while do not felt the same about the second installment. On other hand, Mania.com's Erin Jones criticized the simplicity of the storyline, saying "when you can foresee almost all of the plot, it's hard to truly enjoy the read." Jones also criticized the lack of personality in characters and "the clichéd storyline" as well as the "lackluster illustration". Despite being "too much better than the first volume", the second one "still an awkward read that's a struggle to get through" according to Jones.

=== Manga reception ===
"If you enjoy supernatural stories that blend action, a little romance and focus on the weird and whacky world of the paranormal, you will certainly enjoy Psycho Busters": is this how Julie Gray writing for Comic Book Bin defines the series. She also praised the "quirky humor" and compared it artwork to Bleach's artwork. Comics Village's John Tomas commended "the solid and proper mix of story in action inside", and noted the "strength" of the series is it "storytelling". Dan Polley from Manga Life commented that "[t]he characters are appealing" and described the characters' personalities "intriguing", saying it "offer depth to the story." Active Anime's Holly Ellingwood described Psycho Busters as "a greatly entertaining adventure manga series with a strong dose of rumpus humor and a fair bit of suspenseful action."
