= Sherlock Bones =

Japanese manga series

- Cover of the first volume featuring Sherdog and Takeru.

探偵犬シャードック (Tanteiken Shādokku)
- Manga
- Written by: Yuma Ando
- Illustrated by: Yuki Sato
- Published by: Kodansha
- English publisher: NA: Kodansha USA
- Magazine: Weekly Shōnen Magazine
- Original run: October 19, 2011 – November 28, 2012
- Volumes: 7

Sherlock Bones (Japanese: 探偵犬シャードック, Hepburn: Tanteiken Shādokku), also known as Sherlock the Detective Dog or Tanteiken Sherdock in Japan, is the story of a young teenage boy who adopts a dog from the pound. Once the young boy discovers that his dog can talk with his grandfather's old pipe, they go on adventures and solve crimes. The story was created by Yuma Ando with art by Yuki Sato. The manga was released in Japan in 2012 and translated to English officially in 2013.

== Plot ==
The main character is Takeru Wajima, a 16‑year-old boy who attends London Academy Highschool. His love for dogs prompts him to take a trip to the pound and adopt a dog for himself. Feeling drawn to a quiet puppy, Takeru adopts the animal and heads off on his bike back home. Along the way he runs into his father who helps his son come up with a name for the new member of the family. Driven by a mysterious voice, Takeru names his new puppy Sherdog (English translation). After solving their first 'crime', Sherdog acquires the Wajima family pipe from their living room. With the pipe giving him the ability to speak, Takeru can understand his dog. Sherdog introduces himself as the living legend Sherlock Holmes, and believes Takeru to be his partner Dr. Watson. Together they solve crimes that come their way and form a bond of trust and partnership.

== Characters ==
Sherdog

Sherdog is the reincarnation of Sherlock Holmes who had died 100 years ago. He is a mixed breed puppy with floppy ears and wrinkly feet. Adopted by a teenage boy, he seeks to continue to solve crimes and protect the world from murderers.

He frequently forgets he is a dog, and continues to try and act like a normal human despite his physical appearance. Using a pipe kept by his owners family, he can speak to Takeru to solve the mysteries for him. Sherdog continues to learn about the new world he lives in and adapts to the everyday life of being a dog.

Takeru Wajima

Takeru is a 16‑year‑old second year high school student who is an extreme dog lover. His entire family is made up of cops and detectives, making his meddling in crime scenes less questionable. After adopting Sherdog, Takeru takes the role as his dog's partner Watson and helps voice out Sherdog's discoveries to uncover the mystery. Takeru is a kind and compassionate young man who makes many connections with people but accidentally gets himself into strange situations.

Miki Arisaka

Miki is a 16‑year‑old who is Takeru's classmate in London Academy Highschool and is his current crush. She adores Sherdog and loves to spend time with Takeru. She is also a member of her highschool newspaper staff. When she is in trouble she turns to Takeru for help, showing she treasures him as a good friend.

Airin Wajima

Airin is Takeru's 24‑year‑old sister and a detective in the Violent Crimes Division. She is known as an attractive woman and is thorough in her line of work. Takeru uses her as a way to get into crime scenes. Sherdog calls her Irene because she reminds him of his long lost love from 100 years ago. A big hint to her connection to Irene is when she (indirectly) serves Sherdog tea that she used to make for him when he was human.

Kōsuke Wajima

Kōsuke is Takeru's 48‑year‑old father who works as a police sergeant. He witnesses the naming of Sherdog and loves the puppy when he meets him. He makes important arrests of criminals when called out by Takeru to prevent danger to his son.

Satoko Wajima

Satoko is Takeru's 46‑year‑old mother who is a former policewoman and current housewife for her family. She accepts Sherdog at first, but comes to loathe the puppy after he destroys things and sits in her personal rocking chair. She regretfully tolerates his antics because the puppy stopped a robber in their own home (by accident). She is the scariest member of the family.
