= Gimmick! (manga) =

Japanese manga series

- First volume cover, featuring Kohei Nagase

ギミック! (Gimmikku!)
- Genre: Mystery, thriller
- Manga
- Written by: Yōzaburō Kanari
- Illustrated by: Kuroko Yabuguchi
- Published by: Shueisha
- English publisher: NA: Viz Media
- Magazine: Weekly Young Jump
- Original run: May 12, 2005 – March 8, 2007
- Volumes: 9

Gimmick! (ギミック!, Gimikku!) is a Japanese manga written by Yōzaburō Kanari and illustrated by Kuroko Yabuguchi. It was serialized in Shueisha's seinen manga magazine Weekly Young Jump from 2005 to 2007, with its chapters collected in nine tankōbon volumes. The series was licensed in North America by Viz Media.

== Plot ==
Kohei Nagase is a prodigy special effects artist. He and his friend Shingo Kannazuki, a gifted stuntman, form a special effects company called 'Studio Gimmick'. They do freelance work for various Japanese studios. Often Kohei's makeup skills and Shingo's fighting strength are called in to fight crime. For example, in their first story, the pair help rescue a struggling actress from her manipulative, abusive manager. Another incident involves Kohei creating fake scars so as to confuse and distract evil people.

== Publication ==
Written by Yōzaburō Kanari and illustrated by Kuroko Yabuguchi, Gimmick! was first published in 2004 as a two-part one-shot story in Shueisha's seinen manga magazine Weekly Young Jump on December 2 and 9. It started a regular serialization in the same magazine on May 12, 2005, and finished on March 8, 2007. Shueisha collected its chapters in nine tankōbon volumes, released from September 16, 2005, to May 18, 2007.

In North America, the manga was licensed for English release by Viz Media. The nine volumes were published from June 10, 2008, to October 13, 2009.

=== Volumes ===
Each chapter is called a "scene".

No.	Original release date	Original ISBN	English release date	English ISBN
01	September 16, 2005	978-4-08-876850-2	June 10, 2008	978-1-4215-1778-0
01–02. "Runaway Actress (1–2)"; 03–05. "Monster House of Terror (1–3)"; 06. "While Nude"; 07–08. "Alien Panic 1–2)"; "The Making of Gimmick!: Episode 1"
02	December 19, 2005	978-4-08-876891-5	August 12, 2008	978-1-4215-1779-7
09–13. "Alien Panic (3–7)"; 14. "The Mask of del Fuego"; 15–18. "Over the Rainbow (1–4)"; "The Making of Gimmick!: Episode 2"; "Gimmick!: The Inside Story: The Real Kohei"; "Making of Gimmick! Characters"
03	February 17, 2006	978-4-08-877041-3	October 14, 2008	978-1-4215-1780-3
19–20. "Over the Rainbow (5–6)"; 21–25. "TB Confidential (1–5)"; "Special One Shot Story: Gimmick! (Part 1)"; "Special One Shot Story: Gimmick! (Part 2)"; "The Making of Gimmick!: Episode 3"; "Gimmick!: The Research Trip"
04	May 19, 2006	978-4-08-877083-3	December 9, 2008	978-1-4215-1781-0
26–27. "TB Confidential (6–7)"; 28. "Mone-y Train"; 29. "Great Stuntman"; 30–31. "Sunrise Boulevard (1–2)"; 32. "Miracle in 35-Chome"; 33. "Rosebud"; 34–36. "The Sorcerer's Apprentice (1–3)"; "The Making of Gimmick!: Episode 4"
05	August 18, 2006	978-4-08-877128-1	February 10, 2009	978-1-4215-1782-7
37–38. "Snow Flower (1–2)"; 39–44. "Field of Dreams (1–6"; "EX.Old Lady Mach!!!"; 45–46. "My Favorite Things (1–2)"; "The Making of Gimmick!: Episode 5"
06	November 17, 2006	978-4-08-877167-0	April 14, 2009	978-1-4215-2205-0
47–49. "My Favorite Things (3–5)"; 50–53. "The Last Action Hero (1–4)"; 54. "The Sorcerer's Apprentice (Basic Skills)"; 55–57. "Mr. Doubt (1–3)"; "The Making of Gimmick!: Episode 6"; "The Making of Gimmick! Characters"
07	January 19, 2007	978-4-08-877212-7	June 9, 2009	978-1-4215-2206-7
58–59. "Mr. Doubt (4–5)"; 60–62. "Across Castle River (1–3)"; 63–68. "Gladiator (1–6)"; "The Making of Gimmick!: Episode 7"; "The Making of Gimmick! Designing SFX"
08	March 19, 2007	978-4-08-877234-9	August 11, 2009	978-1-4215-2207-4
69. "Gladiator (7)"; 70–75. "48 Hours (1–6)"; 76–77. "The Verdict (1–2)"; 78–79. "The Third Man (1–2)"; "The Making of Gimmick!: Episode 8"; "Gimmick! Research Trip Anecdotes"
09	May 18, 2007	978-4-08-877262-2	October 13, 2009	1-4215-2921-1
80–85. "The Third Man (3–8)"; 86–87. "Field of Dreams Redux (1–2)"; "EX2.Fame"; "The Making of Gimmick!: Episode 9"

== Reception ==
Phil Guie of Pop Culture Shock commended the illustrator for capturing the protagonist's "childlike enthusiasm for old monster movies perfectly with lots of full-page panels" and commented that "the creative team also seems to understand that a hero is only as good as his nemesis". Sam Kusek from Pop Culture Shock commended the manga for making "a very nice reference to The Sound of Music".

Manga Life's Barb Lien-Cooper criticized the manga for using movie special effects that "don't translate onto paper". About.com's Deb Aoki commended the manga for featuring "a high-spirited, smart and likeable hero with an unusual profession" but she also criticized the manga for minimal character development and "one-dimensional villains".

Comics Worth Reading's Johanna Draper Carlson commented that "the transformation process is a chance for dramatic art. It's treated intensely, as though it were life-saving surgery, but with the elements and techniques explained to the reader, providing a mini-course in movie makeup". A later review by Carlson commented that "many of Kohei's effects serve no purpose in the bigger story beyond entertaining the reader". Active Anime's Davey C. Jones commented that the manga "keeps the action hoppin' and the mysteries boppin'!"

Coolstreak Comics' Leroy Douresseaux commented that the "action can get pretty intense at times, but never more than anything one would find in a PG-13-rated movie". Douresseaux compared Gimmick! to Case Closed and MacGyver. A later review by Douresseaux commented on "the stories [which] are full of tidbits on special makeup effects and animatronics, the kind of technical details that give stories realism and also intrigue readers".

Jason Thompson's appendix to Manga: The Complete Guide commended the manga for its "basic shonen story structure with the mysterious mentor and the 'ambitious, hardworking person who is ridiculously good at some skill/job/ability'". He also commented on the manga's "cinematic leanings are so distinctly Hollywood-focused, which is questionable in one sense (it'd be nice to know more about the history of Japanese special effects), but on the other sense, makes it easy for a Western reader to follow".

Manga Life's Ysabet Reinhardt MacFarlane appreciated the "real-world references" in the manga "primarily to director Sam Raimi's work".
