= Remote (manga) =

Japanese manga series

- The cover of the first volume of Remote

リモート (Rimōto)
- Manga
- Written by: Seimaru Amagi
- Illustrated by: Tetsuya Koshiba
- Published by: Kodansha
- English publisher: NA: Tokyopop
- Magazine: Weekly Young Magazine
- Original run: 2002 – 2004
- Volumes: 10
- Television drama
- Original network: Nippon TV
- Original run: October 12, 2002 – December 14, 2002

Remote (Japanese: リモート, Hepburn: Rimōto) is a Japanese manga series written by Seimaru Amagi and illustrated by Tetsuya Koshiba. It was published in Kodansha's Young Magazine from 2002 to 2004. The manga follows Kurumi Ayaki, the newest member of the Unsolved Crimes Division, Special Unit B.

Remote was adapted into a ten-episode Japanese television drama in October 2002. Koichi Domoto won Best Supporting Actor for his portrayal of genius policeman Himuro in the 2003 Television Drama Academy Awards, as well as the 6th Nikkan Sports Drama Grand Prix.

The North American version of the manga is published by Tokyopop.

== Plot ==
Kurumi Ayaki has recently retired from her job as a police officer but she needs money for her upcoming wedding. While she wants to return to her old job in the Traffic Department, she is instead assigned to Unsolved Crimes Division, Special Unit A to solve crimes that are deemed "unsolvable" and partnered with the genius inspector Himuro.

== Characters ==
Kurumi Ayaki (彩木くるみ, Ayaki Kurumi)

Kurumi resigned from her job to marry her fiancé Shingo but, because of the recession and of the money he had to borrow to buy her wedding ring, she has to postpone her marriage plans and accept her new job with Kōzaburō Himuro. Kurumi may have developed feelings for Kozaburo Himuro. In the Live Drama Himuro seems to reveal more feelings about Kurumi than the Manga; Himuro asks her to work by his side for a while.

Kōzaburō Himuro (氷室光三郎, Himuro Kōzaburō)

A genius detective who is assigned to the most difficult investigations. A year before the events of Remote, he lost someone dear to him and he shut himself in the basement of his house ("the crypt"). Since he does not leave his room, he needs a partner to do the legwork.
