= Gifted (manga) =

Japanese manga series

- First tankōbon volume cover, featuring Yūya Shiki (left) and Natsuki Amakusa (right).

ギフテッド
- Genre: Mystery; Buddy cop
- Manga
- Written by: Seimaru Amagi
- Illustrated by: Rima Amamiya
- Published by: Kodansha
- Magazine: Nakayoshi
- Original run: December 1, 2021 – present
- Volumes: 13
- Television drama
- Directed by: Ikezawa Tatsuya; Shitamukai Eiki; Yokoo Hatsuki; Muroi Takehito
- Produced by: Naochika; Aoki Yasunori
- Written by: Hayato Miura; Kayo Hikawa; Kyo Kinoe
- Music by: Nobusawa Nobuaki
- Studio: Tokai Television; Wowow
- Original network: FNS (THK, Fuji TV) (S1); Wowow Prime (S2)
- Original run: August 12, 2023 – December 2, 2023
- Episodes: 16
- Anime television series
- Original run: 2027 – scheduled

Gifted (ギフテッド) is a Japanese manga series written by Seimaru Amagi and illustrated by Rima Amamiya. It has been serialized in Kodansha's shōjo manga magazine Nakayoshi since December 2021. A television drama adaptation was broadcast on Tōkai TV and Fuji TV from August to September 2023. A second season aired on Wowow Prime and Wowow On Demand from October to December 2023. An anime television series adaptation is set to premiere in 2027.

== Plot ==
Natsuki Amakusa is a 20-year-old genius detective at the Tokyo Metropolitan Police Department. One day he meets Yūya Shiki, a 17-year-old high schooler born with the innate gift to identify murderers. Using their respective abilities to work together, the two become partners solving various difficult cases.

== Characters ==
Yūya Shiki (四鬼 夕也, Shiki Yūya)
Portrayed by: Hidaka Ukisho
Natsuki Amakusa (天草 那月, Amakusa Natsuki)
Portrayed by: Takahisa Masuda

== Development ==
To choose an illustrator for the manga, a short manga audition competition was held and lasted for around five months. The winner, Rima Amamiya, was chosen out of 115 applicants. Amamiya's art was praised for its portrayal of the characters and impactful use of perspective.

Before serialization, a storyboard draft of a chapter of the manga was made available on Kodansha's Days Neo website.

== Media ==
=== Manga ===
Written by Seimaru Amagi and illustrated by Rima Amamiya, Gifted has been serialized in Kodansha's shōjo manga magazine Nakayoshi since December 1, 2021. The first volume was published on April 21, 2022. As of November 13, 2026, 13 volumes have been released.

==== Volumes ====
No.	Release date	ISBN
1	April 21, 2022	978-4-06-527552-8
2	July 13, 2022	978-4-06-528552-7
3	November 11, 2022	978-4-06-529849-7
4	March 13, 2023	978-4-06-531185-1
5	July 13, 2023	978-4-06-532452-3
6	November 13, 2023	978-4-06-533869-8
7	March 13, 2024	978-4-06-534977-9
8	August 9, 2024	978-4-06-536621-9
9	February 13, 2025	978-4-06-538494-7
10	August 12, 2025	978-4-06-540444-7
11	January 13, 2026	978-4-06-542093-5
12	June 12, 2026	978-4-06-543852-7
13	November 13, 2026	978-4-06-545473-2

=== Drama ===
A television drama adaptation was broadcast on Tōkai TV and Fuji TV from August 12, 2023, to September 30, 2023. A second season aired on Wowow Prime and Wowow On Demand from October 14, 2023, to December 2, 2023. News performed the series' theme song "Gifted" (ギフテッド).

=== Anime ===
An anime television series adaptation was announced on June 4, 2026. It is set to premiere in 2027.
