= Beginning Dream =

2002 single by Akane Sugazaki

Single by Akane Sugazaki

from the album Beginning
- B-side: "Promises"
- Released: July 31, 2002
- Genre: J-pop
- Length: 4:41
- Label: Giza Studio
- Songwriters: Aika Ohno; Akane Sugazaki
- Producer: Kannonji

Akane Sugazaki singles chronology
"Beginning Dream" (2002)	"Kimi no Namae Yobu dakede" (2002)

"Beginning Dream" is a song by Japanese singer Akane Sugazaki. It was released on 31 July 2002 through Giza Studio, as the lead single from her debut studio album Beginning (2003). The song reached number thirty-eight in Japan and has sold over 8,680 copies nationwide.

== Track listing ==
CD single
No.	Title	Writer(s)	Arranger(s)	Length
1.	"Beginning Dream"	Aika Ohno; Akane Sugazaki	Yoshinobu Ohga	4:41
2.	"Promises"	Hiroshi Asai; Sugazaki	Satoru Kobayashi	5:01
3.	"Beginning Dream" (Gipsy's R&B Remix)	Ohno; Sugazaki	Giulio Pierucci	6:20
4.	"Beginning Dream" (Instrumental)	Ohno; Sugazaki	Ohga	4:39

== Charts ==
Chart (2002)	Peak position
Japan (Oricon)	38

== Certification and sales ==
Region	Certification	Certified units/sales
Japan (RIAJ)	None	8,680

== Release history ==
Region	Date	Format	Catalogue Num.	Label	Ref.
Japan	28 May 2003	CD	GZCA-7014	Giza Studio	
