= Akane Sugazaki =

Japanese singer (b. 1989)

Akane Sugazaki 菅崎茜
- Born: January 7, 1989 (age 37); Osaka Prefecture, Japan
- Genres: J-pop
- Occupations: singer; songwriter; idol
- Years active: 2001–2006
- Label: Giza Studio
- Website: web.archive.org/web/20040813042559/http://akane-sugazaki.com:80/

Akane Sugazaki (菅崎 茜, Sugazaki Akane; born 7 January 1989) is a former Japanese pop singer and songwriter. She recorded for the Giza Studio label.

== Biography ==
In 2001 Sugazaki won the Grand Prix Award in Miss Pure Pure Audition 2001 and made a cover appearance for Pure 2x magazine.

In 2002 Sugazaki won GIZA studio's Super Starlight contest. She sang Mai Kuraki's "Stand Up". On July 17 she participated as a guest vocalist on the compilation album Giza studio Mai-K & Friends Hotrod Beach Party.

On July 30 she debuted withsingle "Beginning dream", which was written by Aika Ohno and Yoshinobu Ohga from the band Nothin' but love. The song was used in the advertising campaign for The Music 272 channel program SKY PerfecTV.

In May 2003, Sugazaki released her final single "Koigokoro" which was used as an ending theme for Anime television series Detective School Q. In October she released her first full album Beginning. In November she covered "Ichigo Hakusho" wo Mou Ichido originally by Van Van. The recording appeared on cover album The Hit Parade produced by Tak Matsumoto from rock band B'z.

In 2004 and 2005 Sugazaki regularly appeared on Pan Koujou Thursday Live sessions.

In February 2006 Sugazaki last updated her column corner and one year later was deleted from Giza artist official website.

In 2011 Sugazaki's debut single, Beginning dream, appeared on Giza studio compilation album GIZA studio presents Girls. In 2013 songwriter Aika Ohno covered this song on her album Silent Passage with a new arrangement.

== Discography ==
=== Albums ===
List of EPs, with selected details, chart positions
Title	Album details	Peak chart positions
Title	Album details	JPN
Beginning	Released: 22 October 2003; Label: Giza Studio; Format: CD, digital download	47

=== Singles ===
Single	Year	Peak chart positions	Album
Single	Year	JPN	Album
"Beginning Dream"	2002	38	Beginning
"Kimi no Namae Yobu dakede" (君の名前 呼ぶだけで)	2002	50	Beginning
"Koigokoro" (恋ごころ)	2003	38	Beginning

=== Other appearances ===
List of non-single guest appearances, with other performing artists, showing year released and album name
Title	Year	Other performer(s)	Album
"Girls on the Beach"	2002	Various Artists	Giza Studio Mai-K and Friends Hotrod Beach Party
""Ichigo Hakusho" wo Mo Ichido" (『いちご白書』をもう一度)	2003	Tak Matsumoto	The Hit Parade

== Magazine Interviews ==
From Music Freak Magazine:

- Vol.92 2002/7
- Vol.96 2002/11
- Vol.97 2002/12
- Vol.101 2003/4
- Vol.102 2003/5
- Vol.106 2003/9
- Vol.107 2003/10

From J-Groove Magazine:

- September/2002
- January/2003
- July/2003
