= The Kindaichi Case Files =

Japanese manga series

- First tankōbon volume cover, featuring Hajime Kindaichi

金田一少年の事件簿 (Kindaichi Shōnen no Jikenbo)
- Genre: Mystery
- Manga
- Written by: Yōzaburō Kanari (File and Case series); Seimaru Amagi (other series)
- Illustrated by: Fumiya Satō
- Published by: Kodansha
- English publisher: NA: Tokyopop
- Imprint: Shōnen Magazine Comics (1992–2017); Evening KC (2018–present)
- Magazine: Weekly Shōnen Magazine (1992–2017); Evening (2018–2023); Comic Days (2023–present)
- Original run: October 28, 1992 – present
- Volumes: 103
- Series titles
- 1. File (1992–1997, 27 volumes); 2. Short File (1997–2000, 6 volumes); 3. Case (1998–2001, 10 volumes); 4. New (2004–2011, 14 volumes); 5. 20th Anniversary (2012–2013, 5 volumes); 6. Return (2013–2017, 14 volumes); 7. Age 37 (2018–2024, 18 volumes); 8. 30th Anniversary (2022–2023, 4 volumes); 9. Papa (2025–present, 5 volumes)
Further information
Light novel
Written by	Seimaru Amagi
Illustrated by	Fumiya Satō
Published by	Kodansha
Original run	September 22, 1994 – April 20, 2001
Volumes	9
Television drama
Directed by	Yukihiko Tsutsumi; Nozomu Amemiya; Toya Sato; Takaya Kurata
Written by	Tetsuya Oishi; Manabu Kato; Akihiro Tago; Hajime Narita; Masaki Fukasawa
Studio	Nippon Television; Toho
Original network	NNS (NTV)
Original run	July 15, 1995 – September 16, 1995
Episodes	8
Anime film
Operazakan – Aratanaru Satsujin
Directed by	Daisuke Nishio
Written by	Michiru Shimada
Music by	Kaoru Wada
Studio	Toei Animation
Released	December 14, 1996
Runtime	94 minutes
Anime television series
The File of Young Kindaichi
Directed by	Daisuke Nishio
Music by	Kaoru Wada
Studio	Toei Animation
Original network	NNS (YTV, NTV)
English network	SEA: Animax Asia
Original run	TV series April 7, 1997 – September 11, 2000; TV specials November 12, 2007 – November 19, 2007
Episodes	148 + 3 (TV specials)
Live-action film
Directed by	Yukihiko Tsutsumi
Released	December 13, 1997
Manga
Akechi Case Files
Written by	Seimaru Amagi
Illustrated by	Fumiya Satō
Published by	Kodansha
Magazine	Weekly Shōnen Magazine
Original run	August 13, 1997 – May 17, 2000
Volumes	2
Anime film
Satsuriku no Deep Blue
Music by	Kaoru Wada
Studio	Toei Animation
Released	August 21, 1999
Runtime	91 minutes
Original video animation
The Black Magic Murders
Directed by	Toshiaki Komura
Written by	Isao Murayama
Music by	Kaoru Wada
Studio	Toei Animation
Released	December 17, 2012 – March 15, 2013
Episodes	2
Manga
Takato Case Files
Written by	Seimaru Amagi
Illustrated by	Fumiya Satō
Published by	Kodansha
Magazine	Manga Box
Original run	December 4, 2013 – April 2, 2014
Volumes	1
Anime television series
The File of Young Kindaichi R
Directed by	Yutaka Tsuchida (season 1); Yoko Ikeda (season 2)
Produced by	Michihiko Suwa; Shinji Shimizu
Written by	Atsuhiro Tomioka; Miyuki Kishimoto; Takuya Matsumoto; Yoshifumi Fukushima
Music by	Kaoru Wada
Studio	Toei Animation
Original network	NNS (ytv, Nippon TV)
English network	SEA: Animax Asia
Original run	April 5, 2014 – March 26, 2016
Episodes	47 + 1 TV special
Television drama
The File of Young Kindaichi Neo
Directed by	Hisashi Kimura; Shunsuke Kariyama
Written by	Yuya Takahashi
Studio	Nippon Television
Original network	NNS (Nippon TV)
Original run	July 19, 2014 – September 20, 2014
Episodes	9
Manga
Kinnyaichi Shōnen no Jikenbo
Written by	Yuki Sato
Published by	Kodansha
Magazine	Evening
Original run	December 28, 2021 – February 28, 2023
Volumes	4
Television drama
The File of Young Kindaichi
Directed by	Hisashi Kimura; Shunpei Maruya; Ryuichi Inomata
Written by	Yuko Kawabe; Tetsuya Oishi
Studio	Nippon Television
Original network	NNS (Nippon TV)
Original run	April 24, 2022 – July 3, 2022
Episodes	10
- icon

The Kindaichi Case Files (Japanese: 金田一少年の事件簿, Hepburn: Kindaichi Shōnen no Jikenbo) is a Japanese mystery manga series about the crime solving adventures of a high school student, Hajime Kindaichi, the supposed grandson of the famous (fictional) private detective Kosuke Kindaichi. Written by Yōzaburō Kanari or Seimaru Amagi (depending on series) and illustrated by Fumiya Satō, the Kindaichi series was serialized in Kodansha's shōnen manga magazine Weekly Shōnen Magazine from October 1992 to October 2017, spanning a total of 76 tankōbon volumes. It is one of the earliest works in the mystery manga genre. In North America, the series was published in English by Tokyopop with the title The Kindaichi Case Files. Only the first 17 volumes of the first series were released by Tokyopop.

The series was adapted by Toei Animation into a feature film in 1996 and a 148-episode anime television series broadcast from 1997 to 2000. The series was also adapted into a live-action film, five live-action drama series, three live-action television specials and further animated features for cinema and television. A second 47-episode anime television series adaptation, titled The Kindaichi Case Files R (Returns), was broadcast from 2014 to 2016.

Another manga series, The Case File of Kindaichi Age 37, was serialized in Kodansha's seinen manga magazine Evening from January 2018 to February 2023 and continued on the Comic Days manga app from April 2023 to November 2024. It is set 20 years later, in which Hajime graduates high school, and becomes a manager of a PR firm, but is swung back into mysteries, despite quitting detective work. It was followed by The Case Files of Kindaichi Papa, started on Comic Days in January 2025.

In 1995, The Kindaichi Case Files won the 19th Kodansha Manga Award in the shōnen category. By June 2019, the manga had over 100 million copies in circulation, making it one of the best-selling manga series of all time.

== Overview ==
Kindaichi mysteries are whodunnit stories featuring gruesome (usually multiple) murders, often with a folkloric tinge. Most feature a locked room mystery and recurring elements such as the murder occurring when all surviving suspects have (apparently) airtight alibis.

A notable trait of The Kindaichi Case Files is that the killers are not depicted as psychopathic murderers and the murders are never committed for financial reasons alone. The identified killers all have deep rooted problems, often involving great emotional trauma through the greed or thoughtlessness of others, as their reasons for committing the murder(s). Thus the killers are often portrayed as sympathetic figures, as opposed to cold, calculating killers in some other mystery series.

In addition to this, after being revealed, the criminal usually attempts suicide.

== Characters ==
Hajime Kindaichi (金田一 一(はじめ), Kindaichi Hajime)
Voiced by: Kappei Yamaguchi (1996 anime film), Taiki Matsuno
Portrayed by: Tsuyoshi Domoto (1995), Jun Matsumoto (2001), Kazuya Kamenashi (2005), Ryosuke Yamada (2014), Shunsuke Michieda (2022)
17-year-old Fudo High School student Hajime Kindaichi is unmotivated, lazy, and a little lecherous, much to the exasperation of childhood friend Miyuki Nanase. However, only a few people see his great intelligence and deductive prowess by his 180 IQ, possibly inherited from his grandfather, private detective Kosuke Kindaichi. He is also an accomplished sleight of hand artist. Despite his clumsiness and myriad other flaws, he is a loyal friend and a first-rate detective.
20 years later, he became a PR firm manager, quitting detective work. But crimes never retire. So he was stuck into a case he solved many years ago. He later marries Miyuki and has a child named Tsukumo with her.
Miyuki Nanase (七瀬 美雪, Nanase Miyuki)
Voiced by: Akiko Nakagawa
Portrayed by: Rie Tomosaka (1995), Anne Suzuki (2001), Juri Ueno (2005), Haruna Kawaguchi (2014), Moka Kamishiraishi (2022)
The childhood best friend and next door neighbor of Hajime; many question why a model student like Miyuki is friends with a slacker like him. Deep down inside, Miyuki feels Hajime is not an idiot, and they seem to have a love that neither has yet fully expressed. She possesses remarkable logic and perception, although she is obviously not as gifted as he is. Miyuki is the president of Fudo High's student council. After graduating, she becomes a flight attendant and later marries Hajime, having a child with him.
Isamu Kenmochi (剣持 勇, Kenmochi Isamu)
Voiced by: Isao Natsuyagi (1996 anime film), Jūrōta Kosugi
Portrayed by: Masato Furuoya (1995), Takashi Naitō (2001), Masaya Kato (2005), Tomomitsu Yamaguchi (2014), Ikki Sawamura (2022)
A Tokyo homicide police inspector who met Hajime on his first case, and was so impressed that he has lent the youngster his unquestioning support ever since. He is often the investigating officer on Hajime's cases, and provides the official stamp of approval Hajime often needs to pursue his investigations. He believes fully in Hajime's ability.
20 years later, he retired, but had contact with Hajime.
Kengo Akechi (明智 健悟, Akechi Kengo)
Voiced by: Toshiyuki Morikawa
Portrayed by: Mansaku Ikeuchi (1995)
An extremely intelligent, elite-level police detective (superintendent), who is Kenmochi's supervisor. He is an arrogant and snobbish character that becomes a rival to Kindaichi in crime-solving. However, Akechi (indeliberately) not only helped Kindaichi solve the case, but also aided him out of trouble. His relationship to Kindaichi is abrasive at the least, but they have an unspoken mutual respect for each other's abilities. He often compares the crimes in Japan to his experience in Los Angeles. He is proficient in English and French.
20 years later, he became a Police Commissioner.
Ryuta Saki (佐木 竜太, Saki Ryūta) and Ryuji Saki (佐木 竜二, Saki Ryūji)
Voiced by: Keiichi Nanba, Taisho Iwasaki (Ryuta Saki)
Portrayed by: Tomohiro Hara (1995), Jun Hasegawa (2001) (Ryuta Saki), Daiki Arioka (Ryuji Saki), Taisho Iwasaki (Ryuta Saki)
He is obsessed with filming through a V8 camera. He basically shoots everywhere at any time. His tape helped Kindaichi solve the case. In "The Santa Slayings", his tape recorded a critical piece of evidence and he was killed for this. In "Kindaichi the Killer", his younger brother, Ryuji Saki, who very much resembled his elder brother, approached Kindaichi at a party, telling him his elder brother told him in a dream that Kindaichi would be in trouble. Soon after, Ryuji helped Kindaichi avoid a murder trap. Afterwards, Ryuji claims himself as Kindaichi's assistant and sometimes really helps Kindaichi in solving cases. In the anime series, Ryuta survived the attack in "The Santa Slayings" story arc and Ryuji did not appear later on.
Reika Hayami (速水 玲香, Hayami Reika)
Voiced by: Mayumi Iizuka
Portrayed by: Emiri Nakayama (1995), Wakana Sakai (2001)
A famous actress and singer, first appearing in "Death TV", who initially appeared to be arrogant but turned out to be weak and desperate for protection. After this case, Reika has had a crush on Kindaichi and sent her only Valentine's Day gift, a heart-shaped chocolate, to him without revealing her name. Since then, she and Miyuki seem to be rivals over Kindaichi. In "Playing the Fool", Reika's past, that even she lost memory of, was revealed. In "Reika's Kidnapping", it was revealed that Reika's real mother is veteran actress Keiko Mitamura, but throughout the series Reika never knew it, and it was a secret that only Keiko and Kindaichi know.
20 years later, she retired, married, has a son and is a florist.
Fumi Kindaichi (金田一 二三, Kindaichi Fumi)
Voiced by: Haruna Ikezawa
Kindaichi's cousin. First appeared in "Saint Valentine's Murders" in manga and "The Undying Butterflies" in the anime television series, and later became a regular character appearing in the majority of cases for an extended period. Fumi has good reasoning skills (although not as good as Kindaichi), she even solves a few mysteries on her own. She sometimes pokes fun at Kindaichi when nobody else is around. Inspector Kenmochi nicknames her "Chibikin" (meaning little Kindaichi).
20 years later, she became a mystery novelist (using cases from Hajime's young days), works at a detective agency and no longer has pigtails.
Yoichi Takato (高遠 遙一, Takatō Yōichi)
Voiced by: Kenichi Ono
Portrayed by: Hiroki Narimiya
Kindaichi's nemesis, also known as "The Puppeteer from Hell" (地獄の傀儡師, Jigoku no Kugutsushi). He is known to be extremely intelligent, considers himself to be the evil twin of Kindaichi, and describes their relationship as parallel lines. He is the only son of Reiko Chikamiya, an internationally known magician, who in turn drove Takato to be a magician himself. What he uncovered about the murder of his mother triggered what he is today. A twisted, coldhearted magician who considers his devilish setups for the perfect crime as masterpieces, and tolerates no mistakes from the people he uses as his puppets.
20 years later, he called the trio on his cell.

== Media ==
=== Manga ===
The Kindaichi Case Files is written by Yōzaburō Kanari (File and Case series) and Seimaru Amagi (other series) and illustrated by Fumiya Satō. The series ran 25 years in Kodansha's shōnen manga magazine Weekly Shōnen Magazine from October 28, 1992, to October 18, 2017. Six main series ran in the magazine: File series (FILEシリーズ, Fairu Shirīzu) (1992–1997), collected in twenty-seven tankōbon volumes; Short File series (Short Fileシリーズ, Shōto Fairu Shirīzu) (1997–2000), collected in six tankōbon volumes; Case series (Caseシリーズ, Kēsu Shirīzu) (1998–2001), collected in ten tankōbon volumes; New series (新シリーズ, Shinshirīzu) (2004–2011), collected in fourteen tankōbon volumes; 20th Anniversary series (20周年記念シリーズ, Nijū Shūnenkinen Shirīzu) (2012–2013), collected in five tankōbon volumes; and Return "R" series (金田一少年の事件簿R, Kindaichi Shōnen no Jikenbo R) (2013–2017), collected in fourteen tankōbon volumes.

In North America, Tokyopop licensed the series in 2003. 17 volumes have been published in North America from October 6, 2003, to May 13, 2008, before Tokyopop ceased the series' publication in July 2008.

A seventh series, titled The Case File of Kindaichi Age 37 (金田一37歳の事件簿, Kindaichi 37-sai no Jikenbo), set 20 years later, started in Kodansha's seinen manga magazine Evening on January 23, 2018. In January 2022, it was announced that the series would enter on hiatus. Evening ceased its publication on February 28, 2023, and the series moved to the Comic Days manga app, starting on April 26 of the same year. The series finished on November 27, 2024. 18 tankōbon volumes were released from June 15, 2018, to January 22, 2025.

An eighth series, titled The Case File of Kindaichi 30th (金田一少年の事件簿30th, Kindaichi Shōnen no Jikenbo 30th), was serialized in Evening from January 11, 2022, to February 28, 2023, ending in the magazine's final issue. Four tankōbon volumes were released from May 23, 2022, to April 21, 2023.

A ninth series, titled The Case Files of Kindaichi Papa (金田一パパの事件簿, Kindaichi Papa no Jikenbo), began serialization in Comic Days on January 22, 2025. Its first volume was released on June 11, 2025. As of October 14, 2026, five volumes have been released.

==== Other series ====
Akechi File series (Akechi Fileシリーズ, Akechi Fairu Shirīzu) was published in Weekly Shōnen Magazine between 1998 and 2000, and compiled into two tankōbon volumes.

Takato Case Files (高遠少年の事件簿, Takatō Shōnen no Jikenbo) started on Manga Box app in 2013 and finished in 2014. Its chapters were collected in a single tankōbon volume, published on May 9, 2014.

A spin-off manga illustrated by Awabako, titled Kindaichi Shōnen no Ippaku Futsuka Shōryokō (金田一少年の1泊2日小旅行; "Kindaichi Case Files: The Mini-Vacation"), was published on Manga Box from April 23, 2014, to December 7, 2016. Its chapters were collected in three tankōbon volumes released from September 17, 2014, to December 9, 2016.

Kindaichi Shōnen no Jikenbo Gaiden: Hannin-tachi no Jikenbo (金田一少年の事件簿外伝 犯人たちの事件簿; "Kindaichi Case Files Spinoff: Criminal Case Files"), written and illustrated by Shinpei Funatsu, was published on Magazine Pocket app from July 4, 2017, to March 25, 2020; the series had a "revival" serialization, titled Kindaichi Shōnen no Jikenbo Gaiden R: Hannin-tachi no Jikenbo (金田一少年の事件簿外伝R 犯人たちの事件簿) from March 2 to May 11, 2022. Its chapters were collected in eleven tankōbon volumes released from November 17, 2017, to June 16, 2022.

A 4-panel comedy spin-off manga, titled Kinnyaichi Shōnen no Jikenbo (きんにゃいち少年の事件簿) was serialized in Evening from December 28, 2021, to February 28, 2023.

=== Light novels ===
The novels were written by Seimaru Amagi and illustrated by Fumiya Satō. Nine volumes were released between September 22, 1994, and April 20, 2001.

=== Anime ===
Produced by Toei Animation and directed by Daisuke Nishio, the anime adaptation of the original manga aired on Yomiuri TV, Nippon Television and other NNS stations between April 7, 1997, and September 11, 2000, spanning 148 episodes plus one special episode. In addition, two animated films were released on December 14, 1996, and August 21, 1999, respectively. Seven years after the conclusion of the TV anime, two new animated episodes were aired in Japan on November 12, 2007, and November 19, 2007, respectively.

On April 6, 2007, DVD collector's box of Kindaichi was released by Warner Home Video to mark the 10th anniversary of airing of the original TV anime.

The series aired on Animax Asia as The File of Young Kindaichi in Japanese with English subtitles.

To celebrate the 20th anniversary of the series, two special episodes based on "The Black Magic Murders" were released on DVDs in November 2012 and February 2013.

A revival of the anime television series, The File of Young Kindaichi Returns, aired from April 5 to September 27, 2014. A second season aired from October 3, 2015, to March 26, 2016. They were streamed on Crunchyroll during their original broadcast.

=== Video games ===
Seven Kindaichi video games were released as of September 17, 2009. All of them were released in Japan only. Many of the game voice actors differ from those in the anime version.

No.	Title	Platform	Release date
1	"The Kindaichi Case Files: Hihō Island: The New Tragedy" (金田一少年の事件簿 悲報島 新たなる惨劇, "Kindaichi Shōnen no Jikenbo Hihōtō Arata Naru Sangeki")	Windows, PlayStation	November 29, 1996
2	"The Kindaichi Case Files: Star Viewing Island: Sad Demon of Revenge" (金田一少年の事件簿 星見島 悲しみの復讐鬼, "Kindaichi Shōnen no Jikenbo Hoshimitō Kanashimi no Fukushūki")	Sega Saturn (Hudson Soft)	January 15, 1998
3	"The Kindaichi Case Files: Hell Park Murder Case" (金田一少年の事件簿 地獄遊園殺人事件, "Kindaichi Shōnen no Jikenbo Jigoku Yūen Satsujin Jiken")	PlayStation	March 26, 1998
4	"The Kindaichi Case Files: Azure Dragon Legend Murder Case" (金田一少年の事件簿 青龍伝説殺人事件, "Kindaichi Shōnen no Jikenbo Seiryū Densetsu Satsujin Jiken")	PlayStation	August 5, 1999
5	"The Kindaichi Case Files: 10th Year's Invitation" (金田一少年の事件簿 10年目の招待状, "Kindaichi Shōnen no Jikenbo Jūnenme no Shōtaijō")	Game Boy Color	December 16, 2000
6	"Detective Conan & The Kindaichi Case Files: The Meeting of the Two Famous Detectives" (名探偵コナン&金田一少年の事件簿 めぐりあう2人の名探偵, "Meitantei Konan to Kindaichi Shōnen no Jikenbo Meguri Au Futari no Meitantei")	Nintendo DS	February 5, 2009
7	"The Kindaichi Case Files: Devil's Killing Navigation" (金田一少年の事件簿 悪魔の殺人航海, "Kindaichi Shōnen no Jikenbo Akuma no Satsujin Kōkai")	Nintendo DS	September 17, 2009

=== CD books ===
Kodansha released two CD books in 1996 and 1997 respectively. Both have been made into anime. However, nearly all of the CD books' voice actors are not the same as those in the anime version.

No.	Title	Publisher	Release date
1	"The Kindaichi Case Files: Devil Suite Murder Case" (金田一少年の事件簿 悪魔組曲殺人事件, "Kindaichi Shōnen no Jikenbo Akuma Kumikyoku Satsujin Jiken")	Kodansha	January 17, 1996
2	"The Kindaichi Case Files: Death God Hospital Murder Case" (金田一少年の事件簿 死神病院殺人事件, "Kindaichi Shōnen no Jikenbo Shinigami Byōin Satsujin Jiken")	Kodansha	April 21, 1997

=== Live action film and series ===
Nippon Television aired five live action series in 1995, 1996, 2001, 2014, and 2022. Specials were aired in 2005, 2013, and 2014.

In the first adaptation, Tsuyoshi Dōmoto of Kinki Kids and Rie Tomosaka starred as Hajime Kindaichi and Miyuki Nanase for two seasons. They also starred in a live action film entitled Shanghai Mermaid Legend Murder Case, directed by Yukihiko Tsutsumi, released on December 13, 1997, in Japan, adaptated from the Kindaichi novel of the same title.

In the second adaptation, Jun Matsumoto of Arashi starred as Hajime Kindaichi, with Suzuki Anne as Miyuki Nanase.

In the third adaptation in 2005, a special based on "The Legendary Vampire Murders" was aired featuring Kazuya Kamenashi of KAT-TUN and Ueno Juri as Kindaichi and Miyuki Nanase.

In the fourth adaptation, Hey! Say! JUMP's Ryosuke Yamada starred as Hajime Kindaichi, while Haruna Kawaguchi portrayed Miyuki Nanase. In 2013, a special based on Hong Kong Kowloon Treasure Murder Case was aired, featuring Yamada and fellow JUMP member Daiki Arioka, with Haruna Kawaguchi, Vivian Hsu, Eric Tsang, Big Bang member Seungri, Rookies actor Kenta Kiritani and Taiwanese actor Chun Wu (Japanese voice dubber was Daisuke Namikawa, Jellal from Fairy Tail). In 2014, a special based on Gate of Jail Private School Murder Case aired, also featuring Yamada. Wu (Japanese voice dubber was Hiroki Touchi) and Kawaguchi, who appeared in the previous special, were also included, as well as 2PM's Nichkhun.

In the fifth adaptation in 2022, Shunsuke Michieda of Naniwa Danshi starred as Hajime Kindaichi, and Moka Kamishiraishi portrayed Miyuki Nanase.

Gen.	S	Title	Ep	Airing Date
1	1	The Files of Young Kindaichi	8+2 SP	July 15, 1995 – September 16, 1995
1	2	The Files of Young Kindaichi	9	July 13, 1996 – September 14, 1996
1	-	The Files of Young Kindaichi; Shanghai Mermaid Legend Murder Case	Film	December 13, 1997
2	1	The Files of Young Kindaichi	9+1 SP	March 25, 2001 – September 15, 2001
3	1	The Files of Young Kindaichi	1 SP	September 24, 2005
4	1	The Files of Young Kindaichi Neo	9+2 SP	July 19, 2014 – September 20, 2014
5	1	The Files of Young Kindaichi 5	10	April 24, 2022 – July 3, 2022

=== Detective Conan & Kindaichi ===
The first issue of the crossover series between Case Closed and The Kindaichi Case Files

In celebration of the 50th anniversary of Weekly Shōnen Sunday and Weekly Shōnen Magazine, the two magazines collaborated to publish twelve biweekly magazines consisting of chapters from Weekly Shōnen Sunday's Case Closed and Weekly Shōnen Magazine's The Kindaichi Case Files. The magazine ran between April 10, 2008, and September 25, 2008.

== Reception ==
By February 2012, the manga had over 90 million copies in circulation. By June 2019, it had over 100 million copies in circulation. Kindaichi tankōbon were ranked 2nd and 3rd in a Japanese Comic Ranking in October, 2009.

In 1995, the manga won the Kodansha Manga Award in the shōnen category.

Allen Divers of Anime News Network said that while The Kindaichi Case Files "presents some whoppers", the series also has mysteries that are very "familiar", calling it "the Japanese version of the Hardy Boys or Nancy Drew". In Manga: The Complete Guide Jason Thompson described the mystery scenarios as "inventive and intricate, offering genuine brain teasers", but criticized the artwork as "bland".
