= The Knight in the Area =

Japanese manga series and its adaptations

- Ninth tankōbon volume cover, featuring brothers Kakeru (front) and Suguru Aizawa (back)

エリアの騎士 (Eria no Kishi)
- Genre: Sports
- Manga
- Written by: Hiroaki Igano
- Illustrated by: Kaya Tsukiyama
- Published by: Kodansha
- Imprint: Shōnen Magazine Comics
- Magazine: Weekly Shōnen Magazine
- Original run: April 26, 2006 – March 29, 2017
- Volumes: 57
- Anime television series
- Directed by: Hirofumi Ogura
- Produced by: Motomichi Araki; Tomoharu Matsuhisa
- Music by: Yasunori Iwasaki; Keiji Inai
- Studio: Shin-Ei Animation
- Original network: TV Asahi
- Original run: January 7, 2012 – September 29, 2012
- Episodes: 37
- icon

The Knight in the Area (Japanese: エリアの騎士, Hepburn: Eria no Kishi) is a Japanese manga series written by Hiroaki Igano and illustrated by Kaya Tsukiyama. It was serialized in Kodansha's shōnen manga magazine Weekly Shōnen Magazine from April 2006 to March 2017, with its chapters collected in 57 tankōbon volumes. A 37-episode anime television series adaptation produced by Shin-Ei Animation was broadcast on TV Asahi from January to September 2012.

== Plot ==
Kakeru Aizawa is the younger brother to Suguru Aizawa, a soccer prodigy belonging to Japan's under-15 national team. Prior to the series, Kakeru quits his position as a forward after a traumatic experience prevented him from playing with his left leg and settles for a managerial position. After the two are hit by a truck, Suguru dies and has his heart transplanted into Kakeru. With it, Kakeru returns to soccer to achieve his brother's dream of winning the World Cup.

== Characters ==
Kakeru Aizawa (逢沢 駆, Aizawa Kakeru)
Voiced by: Yūko Sanpei
Kakeru is Suguru's younger brother and a forward on his soccer team. After accidentally injuring his teammate Hibino with a powerful left-footed shot in sixth grade, he avoids using that foot, severely limiting his scoring ability and confidence. He gradually withdraws from playing, assisting as manager instead, frustrating Suguru. He secretly practices alone at night until his childhood friend, Mishima Nana, returns as team manager. A masked challenger—later revealed to be Nana, urged by Suguru—motivates him to return. After a truck accident kills Suguru, Kakeru receives his brother's heart, inheriting his skills and resolve. Learning of Suguru's dream to win the World Cup together, Kakeru dedicates himself to fulfilling it.
Suguru Aizawa (逢沢 傑, Aizawa Suguru)
Voiced by: Jun Fukuyama, Motoko Kumai (child)
Suguru is Kakeru's older brother, a prodigious midfielder and captain of his school soccer team, having also played for Japan's U-15 squad. Regarded as a future star of Japanese football, he grows frustrated with Kakeru's reluctance to play despite recognizing his talent. Before his death, Suguru experiences recurring nightmares that cease the day he and Kakeru are struck by a truck. Mortally wounded, Suguru's heart is transplanted into Kakeru, fulfilling what he envisions in a dream as his "final pass". Through this act, Suguru passes on his dream of winning the World Cup, which Kakeru vows to achieve.
Nana Mishima (美島 奈々, Mishima Nana)
Voiced by: Shizuka Itō
A childhood friend of Suguru and Kakeru, nicknamed Seven. Since returning from Los Angeles, she has become a manager, like Kakeru. She is skilled in soccer and has a relation to Kakeru. She supports and helps him to improve his skills, and later ends up engaged to him in the epilogue.
Kota Nakatsuka (中塚 公太, Nakatsuka Kouta)
Voiced by: Minoru Shiraishi
Yusuke Saeki (佐伯 祐介, Saeki Yusuke)
Voiced by: Tarusuke Shingaki
Mito Aizawa (逢沢 美都, Aizawa Mito)
Voiced by: Kei Shindō
Aizawa's Father
Voiced by: Aruno Tahara
Aizawa's Mother
Voiced by: Rei Sakuma

== Media ==
=== Manga ===
Written by Hiroaki Igano and illustrated by Kaya Tsukiyama, The Knight in the Area was serialized in Kodansha's shōnen manga magazine Weekly Shōnen Magazine from April 26, 2006, to March 29, 2017. Kodansha collected its chapters in 57 tankōbon volumes, released from August 17, 2006, to May 17, 2017.

=== Anime ===
A 37-episode anime television series, produced by Shin-Ei Animation and directed by Hirofumi Ogura, was broadcast on TV Asahi from January 7 to September 29, 2012. The opening theme song is Higher Ground (ハイヤーグラウンド, "Haiyā Guraundo") by "S.R.S".

The series was simulcasted by Crunchyroll in the United States, Canada, the United Kingdom, Ireland, South Africa, Australia, and New Zealand.

== Reception ==
By August 2021, the manga had over 13 million copies in circulation.
