= Fumiya Satō =

Japanese manga artist

- Born: 22 December 1965 (age 60); Omiya, Saitama, Japan
- Occupation: Manga artist

Fumiya Satō (さとう ふみや, Satō Fumiya; born Fumiko Satō (佐藤文子, Satō Fumiko), 22 December 1965 in Omiya, Saitama, Japan) is a Japanese manga artist. She is best known for the manga series The Kindaichi Case Files and Detective School Q. In 1995, she received the Kodansha Manga Award for her work on The Kindaichi Case Files.
