= Shin Kibayashi =

Japanese manga artist (born 1962)

- Born: July 22, 1962 (age 64); Tokyo, Japan
- Occupations: manga storywriter, novelist and screenwriter
- Known for: Psychometrer Eiji; The Kindaichi Case Files; GetBackers; Drops of God; The Knight in the Area

Shin Kibayashi (樹林 伸, Kibayashi Shin; born July 22, 1962, in Tokyo, Japan) is a Japanese manga storywriter, novelist and screenwriter. Under the name Yuma Ando, he received the 2003 Kodansha Manga Award for shōnen for writing Kunimitsu no Matsuri. The pen name "Tadashi Agi" (亜樹 直) is shared with his sister Yūko Kibayashi (樹林ゆう子, Kibayashi Yūko). He graduated from Tokyo Metropolitan Musashi Senior High School and Waseda University School of Economics & Political Science.

== Pen names ==
Besides the main pen-name of "Tadashi Agi", Shin Kibayashi also goes by other pen names:

- Seimaru Amagi (天樹征丸 Amagi Seimaru)
- Yuma Ando (安童夕馬 Andō Yūma)
- Yuya Aoki (青樹佑夜 Aoki Yūya)
- Jōji Arimori (有森丈時 Arimori Jōji)
- Hiroaki Igano (伊賀大晃 Igano Hiroaki)
- Ryō Ryūmon (龍門諒 Ryūmon Ryō)
- S.K

== Works ==
=== As Seimaru Amagi ===
- Kindaichi Shōnen no Jikenbo (金田一少年の事件簿) (1992–present, Kodansha), original idea; English translation: Kindaichi Case Files (2004–2008, Tokyopop)
- Tantei Gakuen Kyū (探偵学園Q, Detective School Q) (2001–2005, Kodansha)
- Rimōto (リモート) (2002–2004, Kodansha); English translation: Remote (2004–2006, Tokyopop)
- Zero: Kage Miko (零 影巫女, Fatal Frame: Shadow Priestess) (2014–2017, DeNA)
- Y no Hakobune (Yの箱船) (2015–2021, Shogakukan)
- Gifted (ギフテッド) (2021–ongoing, Kodansha)

=== As Tadashi Agi ===
- Gakkou no Kowai Uwasa (学校の怖い噂) (1994–1995, Kodansha)
- Saiko Dokutā (サイコドクター, Psycho Doctor) (1995–2003, Kodansha)
- Saiko Dokutā Kaikyōsuke (サイコドクター楷恭介, Psycho Doctor Kai Kyousuke) (2004, Kodansha)
- Kami no Shizuku (神の雫) (2004–2014, Kodansha); English translation: The Drops of God (2011–2012, Vertical)
- Kaitō Ruban (怪盗ルヴァン) (2014–2015, Kodansha)
- Marriage ~The Drops of God Final Arc~ (マリアージュ 〜神の雫 最終章〜) (2015–2020, Kodansha)

=== As Yuma Ando ===
- Saikometorā Eiji (サイコメトラーEIJI, Psychometrer Eiji) (1996–2000, Kodansha)
- Kunimitsu no Matsuri (クニミツの政) (2001–2005, Kodansha)
- Tokyo Eitīzu (東京エイティーズ, Tokyo Eighties) (Shogakukan) (2003–2005, Kodansha)
- Shibatora (シバトラ) (2006–2009, Kodansha)
- Saikometorā (サイコメトラー, Psychometrer) (2011–hiatus, Kodansha)
- Tanteiken Shādokku (探偵犬シャードック) (2011–2013, Kodansha); English translation: Sherlock Bones (2013–2014, Kodansha USA)
- Shinjuku DxD (新宿D×D) (2014–2016, Kodansha)
- Debusen (でぶせん) (2014–2016, DeNA)

=== As Yuya Aoki ===
- Gettobakkāzu Dakkan'ya (ゲットバッカーズ -奪還屋-) (1999–2007 Kodansha); English translation: GetBackers (2004–2008, Tokyopop)
- Saiko Basutāzu (サイコバスターズ) (2003 Kodansha); English translation: Psycho Busters (2008–2009, Del Rey Manga)
- Oniwaka to Ushiwaka -Edge of the World- (鬼若と牛若 —Edge of the World—) (2010–hiatus, Kodansha)

=== As Jōji Arimori ===
- Sunō Dorufin (スノードルフィン, Snow Dolphin) (2000–2001, Kodansha)
- Asobotto Senki Gokū (アソボット戦記五九, Asobot Military History Goku) (2001–2002, Kodansha)

=== As Hiroaki Igano ===
- Area no Kishi (エリアの騎士, The Knight in the Area) (2006–2017, Kodansha) Anime Adaptation 2012
- iContact (iコンタクト) (2021–2022, Kodansha)

=== As Ryō Ryūmon ===
- Bloody Monday (ブラッディ・マンデイ) (2007–2009, Kodansha)

=== As Shin Kibayashi ===
- Kaze to Kaminari (風と雷) (2009, Kodansha)
- Shima Kōsaku no Jiken-bo (島耕作の事件簿) (2017, Kodansha)

== Other media ==
The main characters of Magazine Mystery Reportage were based on then editors of Weekly Shonen Magazine, including Kibayashi who acts as the leader of the team investigating various conspiracies.

On January 14, 2015, it was announced through Nintendo that Kibayashi was writing the story for the fourteenth Fire Emblem game, entitled Fire Emblem Fates.

On August 31, 2021, Netflix announced that they are working with Shin Kibayashi on an original anime series titled Lady Napoleon.
