= List of School Rumble character image albums =

The following character image albums are from the anime series School Rumble. Each largely follows the same track layout, and has songs sung by the voice actors for the respective character and drama tracks including other characters' voice actors. Seven of the albums are for female characters: the female protagonist Tenma Tsukamoto, the supporting characters Yakumo Tsukamoto, Mikoto Suo, Eri Sawachika, and Akira Takano, and two minor characters, Karen Ichijou and Sarah Adiemus. The male protagonist of the series, Kenji Harima, is the only male character to have an image album, making a total of eight.

== Tenma Tsukamoto ==
School Rumble: Tenma Tsukamoto

Studio album by Various
- Released: July 22, 2004
- Genre: Anime soundtrack
- Length: 39:42
- Label: King Records

School Rumble: Tenma Tsukamoto (スクールランブル: 塚本天満) is the first character image album.

=== Track listing ===
	Track name	Artist	Length
1.	Title Call	Various	2:18
2.	Closer	unicorn table	4:11
3.	#01: Karee no Asa (Curry Morning)	Various	2:01
4.	#02: Sanbiki ga Kirareru (The Three Slashed)	Various	3:11
5.	#03: Rakugo (A rakugo* story)	Various	2:47
6.	Tenma no Nikki (Tenma's diary)	Various	0:53
7.	Suteki na Yokan (A wonderful premonition)	Ami Koshimizu	3:44
8.	Dai Ni Kan Yokoku (Volume 2 Notice)	Various	1:04
9.	Cast Talk	Various	2:10
10.	[CM]	Various	1:04
11.	Punk Bung Heart	Aco	4:08
12.	Closer (Off Vocal Version)	-	4:12
13.	Suteki na Yokan (Off Vocal Version)	-	3:44
14.	Punk Bung Heart (Off Vocal Version)	-	4:07

== Yakumo Tsukamoto ==
School Rumble: Yakumo Tsukamoto

Studio album by Various
- Released: August 25, 2004
- Genre: Anime soundtrack
- Length: 44:59
- Label: King Records

School Rumble: Yakumo Tsukamoto (スクールランブル: 塚本八雲) is the second character image album.

=== Track listing ===
	Track name	Artist	Length
1.	Title Call	Various	2:25
2.	Distant Love	unicorn table	4:18
3.	#01: Kokoro ga Yomeru Hi (The day she can read minds)	Various	3:51
4.	#02: Nayamigoto (Worries)	Various	2:38
5.	#03: Anastasia	Various	3:14
6.	Yuugao (Moonflower)	Mamiko Noto	4:17
7.	Yakumo no Nikki (Yakumo's diary)	Various	0:52
8.	Dai San Kan Yokoku (Volume 3 Notice)	Various	1:32
9.	Cast Talk	Various	2:58
10.	[CM]	Various	1:32
11.	Koi no kimochi (The feeling of love)	Mio Saeki	4:21
12.	Distant Love (Off Vocal Version)	-	4:19
13.	Yuugao (Off Vocal Version)	-	4:17
14.	Koi no kimochi (Off Vocal Version)	-	4:19

== Mikoto Suou ==
School Rumble: Mikoto Suou

Studio album by Various
- Released: September 23, 2004
- Genre: Anime soundtrack
- Length: 42:44
- Label: King Records

School Rumble: Mikoto Suou (スクールランブル: 周防美琴) is the third character image album.

=== Track listing ===
	Track name	Artist	Length
1.	Title Call	Various	3:29
2.	Infinity	unicorn table	3:48
3.	#01: Hige to Hankachi (Hige's handkerchief)	Various	3:08
4.	#02: Hanai to Kuroobi (Hanai's black belt)	Various	5:04
5.	The super girl has the super heart	Hitomi Nabatame	3:51
6.	#03: Imadori to D Kappu (Imadori's D-cup)	Various	2:32
7.	Dai Yon Kan Yokoku (Volume 4 Notice)	Various	1:51
8.	Cast Talk	Various	2:30
9.	[CM]	Various	1:36
10.	17's Heart	Mio Saeki	3:35
11.	Infinity (Off Vocal Version)	-	3:50
12.	The super girl has the super heart (Off Vocal Version)	-	3:52
13.	17's Heart (Off Vocal Version)	-	3:31

== Eri Sawachika ==
School Rumble: Eri Sawachika

Studio album by Various
- Released: October 27, 2004
- Genre: Anime soundtrack
- Length: 39:45
- Label: King Records

School Rumble: Eri Sawachika (スクールランブル: 沢近愛理) is the fourth character image album. There are two versions, a Limited Edition and a Regular Edition.

=== Track listing ===
	Track name	Artist	Length
1.	Title Call	Various	1:47
2.	Amai Yume (Sweet Dreams)	unicorn table	4:57
3.	#01: Majikku to Rakugo (Magic and Rakugo)	Various	2:02
4.	#02: Karee Raisu to Hankachi (Curry Rice and Handkerchief)	Various	1:18
5.	#03: Hige to Hirune (Hige and an afternoon nap)	Various	2:02
6.	Feel my feeling	Yui Horie	3:54
7.	#Extra: [Ai] (Love)	Various	1:54
8.	message	Various	1:00
9.	Cast Talk	Various	2:37
10.	[CM]	Various	0:58
11.	Senchimentaru (Sentimental)	HUSH	4:09
12.	Amai Yume (Off Vocal Version)	-	4:57
13.	Feel my feeling (Off Vocal Version)	-	3:55
14.	Senchimentaru (Off Vocal Version)	-	4:07

== Akira Takano ==
School Rumble: Akira Takano

Studio album by Various
- Released: February 23, 2005
- Genre: Anime soundtrack
- Length: 41:29
- Label: King Records

School Rumble: Akira Takano (スクールランブル: 高野晶) is the fifth character image album.

=== Track listing ===
	Track name	Artist	Length
1.	Title Call	Various	0:38
2.	Boy	Kaori Shimizu	3:29
3.	#01: Cha no Michi, Kokoro no Michi	Various	5:56
4.	#02: Ame Agaru	Various	3:27
5.	BGM Collection 1 [M#1, M#2, M#4]	Toshiyuki Omori	3:07
6.	Mini Drama 1~5	Various	5:56
7.	BGM Collection 2 [M#7, M#9, M#13]	Toshiyuki Omori	3:57
8.	He stands the rain	Ami Koshimizu	3:25
9.	[CM]	Various	0:55
10.	[Notice]	Various	1:17
11.	Boy (off vocal version)	-	3:30
12.	He stands the rain (off vocal version)	-	3:26
13.	Scramble Shock!!	Various	2:19

== Karen Ichijou ==
School Rumble – Karen Ichijou

Studio album by Various
- Released: March 24, 2005
- Genre: Anime soundtrack
- Label: King Records

School Rumble: Karen Ichijou (スクールランブル:一条かれん) is the sixth character image album.

=== Track listing ===
1. ♯00: Title Call
2. 毎日がRendez-vous
3. ♯01: 巌流島
4. ♯02: TRY
5. BGM集(1) (M 3, M 5, M 8)
6. ミニドラマ1~5
7. BGM集(2) (M 14, M 20)
8. スキダカラ。
9. (CM)
10. (予告)
11. 毎日がRendezvous (Off Vocal Version)
12. スキダカラ。(Off Vocal Version)
13. スクランブル・ショック!!

== Sarah Adiemus ==
School Rumble – Sarah Adiemus

Studio album by Various
- Released: April 27, 2005
- Genre: Radio drama
- Label: King Records

School Rumble: Sarah Adiemus (スクールランブル: サラ・アディエマス) is the seventh character image album.

=== Track listing ===
1. 00: Title Call
2. Best Friend(福井裕佳梨)
3. 01: ヴァンパイア
4. 02: 寡黙な女神
5. BGM集 (M 15・M 16)
6. ミニドラマ
7. BGM集 (M 17・M 18)
8. Loving you
9. CM
10. 予告
11. Best Friend (Off Vocal Version)
12. Loving you (Off Vocal Version)
13. スクランブル・ショック!!

== Kenji Harima ==
School Rumble – Kenji Harima

Studio album by Various
- Released: May 25, 2005
- Genre: Anime soundtrack
- Label: King Records

School Rumble: Kenji Harima (スクールランブル: スクールランブル：播磨拳児) is the eighth character image album. There are two versions, a Limited Edition and a Regular Edition.

=== Track listing ===
1. 00: Title Call
2. 銀河沿線 '05(高橋広樹)
3. 01: トゥルー・ホリデー
4. 02: 恋は舞い降りた
5. 破天荒ロボ ドジビロンのテーマ
6. ミニドラマ1~5
7. 海の男はよ
8. CM
9. 予告
10. 銀河沿線 '05 (Off Vocal Version)
11. 破天荒ロボ ドジビロンのテーマ (Off Vocal Version)
12. 海の男はよ(Off Vocal Version)
13. スクランブル・ショック!!
