= List of School Rumble chapters =

The cover of School Rumble volume 1 as released by Del Rey Manga on February 28, 2006, in North America.

The chapters of School Rumble are written and illustrated by Jin Kobayashi. The series is being serialized in Japan in Weekly Shōnen Magazine and has been collected into 22 bound novels by Kodansha. It has been licensed for an English-language release in the United States and Canada by Del Rey Manga, and in the United Kingdom by Tanoshimi.

The series was adapted into two 26-episode-long anime television series and two 2-episode-long original video animations (OVAs) by the Japanese animation studio Studio Comet, and the anime series were originally aired on TV Tokyo. The first anime and OVA series are each licensed for an English release in Australia and New Zealand by Madman Entertainment, in the United States and Canada by Funimation Entertainment, and in the United Kingdom by Revelation Films; the second anime series, School Rumble: Second Semester, has only been licensed for release in the United States by Funimation. The second OVA series has not yet been licensed in English.

In their English translation, Del Rey decided to leave names in Japanese order (family name, then given name) in order to better preserve the puns. This list presents names in Western order (given name, then family name). Individual chapters are called ♯ (musical sharps), with side stories called ♭ (musical flats).

== Chapter list ==
=== School Rumble ===
No.	Original release date	Original ISBN	English release date	English ISBN
01	May 16, 2003	978-4-06-363244-6	February 28, 2006 (NA); January 4, 2007 (UK)	978-0-345-49147-3 (NA); ISBN 978-0-09-950626-3 (UK)
001. Plan1 from Outerspace; 002. Easy Rider; 003. Deep Space Nine; 004. Book of Love; 005. Enter the Dragon; 006. You've Got Mail; 007. Death Race 2003; 008. The Great Escape; 009. The Girl Who Knew Little; 010. La Belle Noiseuse; 011. The Towering Inferno; 012. Unforgiven; 013. Broken Arrow; 014. Speed; 015. Rain Man; 016. Wild Party; ♭01. Wonder Woman; ♭02. Rainy Days and Mondays; About the Creator; Translation Notes; Preview of Volume 2
02	August 17, 2003	978-4-06-363290-3	May 30, 2006 (NA); January 4, 2007 (UK)	978-0-345-49148-0 (NA); ISBN 978-0-09-950627-0 (UK)
Special Chapter; 017. Field of Dreams; 018. Falling in Love; 019. I Wanna Hold Your Hand; 020. Love is War; 021. Mighty Ducks; 022. Duel; 023. Shopping; 024. Contact; 025. Apocalypse Now; 026. Last Action Hero; 027. The Cook & Girls; 028. The Deep; 029. The Boy Can't Help It; 030. A River Runs Through It; ♭03. It's a Beautiful Day; ♭04. Haunted; ♭05. High Noon; About the Creator; Translation Notes; Preview of Volume 3
03	December 17, 2003	978-4-06-363321-4	August 29, 2006 (NA); February 1, 2007 (UK)	978-0-345-49149-7 (NA); ISBN 978-0-09-950632-4 (UK)
031. God Father; 032. Deux; 033. From Here to Eternity; 034. The Shining; 035. Life is Beautiful; 036. Boy Meets Girl; 037. Mission Impossible; 038. Nuovo Cinema Paradiso; 039. The Rain People; 040. Good Fellows; 041. Die Hard II; 042. Close Encounters of the Third Kind; 043. Summertime Blues; 044. Island in the Sun; 045. Love Me Tender; 046. Dark Commander; ♭06. Tea for Two; ♭07. Plein Soliel; ♭08. Private Lessons; About the Creator; Translation Notes; Preview of Volume 4
04	March 17, 2004	978-4-06-363346-7	December 26, 2006 (NA); February 1, 2007 (UK)	978-0-345-49150-3 (NA); ISBN 978-0-09-950633-1 (UK)
047. Girl Fight; 048. Outrageous Miss Fortune; 049. Tora! Tora! Tora!; 050. Working Girl; 051. Singles; 052. The Wrong Man; 053. Thunder Cop; 054. Somewhere in Time; 055. Twin Peaks; 056. Haunted Honeymoon; 057. Bodily Harm; 058. The Four Seasons; ♭09. The Call of the Wild; ♭10. Lady in White; ♭11. Only When I Laugh; ♭12. Bless the Beasts & Children; About the Creator; Translation Notes; Preview of Volume 5
05	June 17, 2004	978-4-06-363391-7	March 27, 2007 (NA); April 5, 2007 (UK)	978-0-345-49151-0 (NA); ISBN 978-0-09-950652-2 (UK)
059. Groundhog Day; 060. Trading Places; 061. A Star is Born; 062. The Graduate; 063. Lover Come Back; 064. Persona; 065. While You Were Sleeping; 066. The Razor's Edge; 067. The Incredible Journey; 068. Mouse Hunt; 069. The McKenzie Break; 070. Three Violent Chooks; 071. Renegade; 072. Teacher's Pet; ♭13. China Girl; ♭14. Picture Perfect; ♭15. Once Upon a Time in Mexico; ♭16. Running Man; About the Creator; Translation Notes; Preview of Volume 6
06	September 17, 2004	978-4-06-363433-4	July 10, 2007 (NA); July 5, 2007 (UK)	978-0-345-49152-7 (NA); ISBN 978-0-09-950665-2 (UK)
073. Cookie's Fortune; 074. Winning; 075. Battleground; 076. Big Man on Campus; 077. Farewell to the Kings; 078. Dead or Alive; 079. Soldiers of Innocence; 080. The Pride and the Passion; 081. You're a Big Big Boy Now; 082. Some Came Running; 083. True Blood; 084. Slow Dancing in the Big City; ♭17. Eye of the Cat; ♭18. Jump into Hell; ♭19. Best Friends; About the Creator; Translation Notes; Preview of Volume 7
07	December 17, 2004	978-4-06-363464-8	September 25, 2007 (NA); October 4, 2007 (UK)	978-0-345-49618-8 (NA); ISBN 978-0-09-950674-4 (UK)
085. The Turning Point; 086. Appointment with Danger; 087. The Wrong Woman; 088. Souls at Sea; 089. The Rescuers; 090. The Shootist; 091. Let's Make Love; 092. Cousin Bette; 093. Uri Geller; 094. Three Bewildered People in the Night; 095. Le Sorelle; 096. Can't Stop the Music; ♭20. Hope Floats; ♮01. Ballad in Blue; Short Rumble; About the Creator; Translation Notes; Preview of Volume 8
08	March 17, 2005	978-4-06-363505-8	January 15, 2008 (NA); January 3, 2008 (UK)	978-0-345-50143-1 (NA); ISBN 978-0-09-950644-7 (UK)
097. Two for the Road; 098. The Birthday Party; 099. The True Hearted; 100. Gelosia; 101. Too Hot to Handle; 102. Johnny Got His Gun; 103. The Dogs of War; 104. The Ultimate Thrill; 105. Quick; 106. La Travestie; 107. Whispers in the Dark; 108. Truly, Madly, Deeply; ♭21. Nuit Docile; ♭22. The Secret Garden; ♭23. California Man; About the Creator; Translation Notes
09	June 17, 2005	978-4-06-363540-9	April 15, 2008 (NA); June 5, 2008 (UK)	978-0-345-50144-8 (NA); ISBN 978-0-09-951037-6 (UK)
109. Sleeping with the Enemy; 110. Things I Never Told You; 111. A Change of Seasons; 112. Finding Forrester; 113. The Odd Couple; 114. Venom; 115. She's the One; 116. Small-Time Crooks; 117. Mrs. Doubtfire; 118. Carnival Story; 119. A Nous Deux; ♭24. An Unsuitable Job for a Woman; ♭25. Monsters Inc.; ♭26. Amore e Chiacchiere; About the Creator; Translation Notes
10	September 16, 2005	978-4-06-363573-7	July 15, 2008	978-0-345-50333-6
120. Naughty Marietta; 121. It Could Happen to You; 122. Awakenings; 123. The Neverending Story; 124. Invitation to the Dance; 125. Heat; 126. Striptease; 127. The Rookie; 128. The League of Extraordinary Gentlemen; 129. Small Soldiers; ♭27. My Girl; ♭28. Days of Thunder; ♭29. Miss Annie Rooney; About the Creator; Translation Notes
11	December 16, 2005	978-4-06-363614-7	November 11, 2008	978-0-345-50562-0
130. Space Jam; 131. The Basketball Diaries; 132. The Browning Version; 133. Chocolat; 134. Top of the World; 135. Short Cuts; 136. The Gods of Cookerly; 137. If the Shoe Fits; 138. Birthday Girl; 139. The Dead Class; 140. Escape to Victory; ♭30. Assault on a Queen; ♭31. Girls Night; ♭32. A Better Tomorrow; About the Creator; Translation Notes
12	April 17, 2006	978-4-06-363641-3	April 28, 2009	978-0-345-50563-7
141. Telling Lies in America; 142. Monkey Business; 143. Soul of a Painter; 144. Calendar Girl; 145. As Good as it Gets; 146. One Hour with You; 147. Test Pilot; 148. Sans Toit Ni Loi; 149. Arlington Road; 150. Legal Eagles; 151. The Associate; 152. Charlie & Louise; ♭33. The Bear; Bonus Rumble; About the Creator; Translation Notes
13	June 16, 2006	978-4-06-363679-6	September 29, 2009	978-0-345-50564-4
153. High Society; 154. The Gift; 155. Shall We Dance?; 156. Le Trou; 157. The Pistol, the Birth of the Legend; 158. The Santa Clause; 159. Jingle All the Way; 160. The Lion King; 161. The Jerk; 162. Men in Black; 163. Summer Lovers; 164. Cocktail; ♭34. Sister Act; ♭35. Conte d'Hiver; ♭36. Cold Heat; Bonus Rumble; About the Creator; Translation Notes
14	September 15, 2006	978-4-06-363718-2	July 27, 2010	978-0-345-50823-2
165. Aspen Extreme; 166. Love on the Run; 167. Love at Large; 168. Stakeout; 169. Gigi; 170. The Next Best Thing; 171. An Officer and a Gentlemen; 172. Lo Straniero; 173. Sayuri; 174. The Invisible Circus; 175. The Thing; 176. Sin City; 177. Out on a Limb; 178. The Replacements; ♭37. My Funny Valentine; ♭38. Stacy's Knights; Bonus Rumble; About the Creator; Translation Notes
15	December 15, 2006	978-4-06-363759-5	July 27, 2010	978-0-345-50823-2
179. The Last Samurai; 180. Goal!; 181. Traffic; 182. Modelato Cantabile; 183. Effroyables Jardins; 184. Phantom of the Opera; 185. Jenatsch; 186. River of No Return; 187. O Brother, Where Art Thou?; 188. Paparazzi; 189. Sleepless in Seattle; 190. The Sound of Music; 191. Hard Promises; ♭39. Il Futuro e Donna; ♭40. Taxi; ♭41. Desperado; Bonus Rumble; About the Creator; Translation Notes
16	March 16, 2007	978-4-06-363803-5	July 27, 2010	978-0-345-50823-2
192. Mr. Holland's Opus; 193. The School of Rock; 194. Future World; 195. Intersection; 196. The Man from Snowy River; 197. Toxic Affair; 198. Legally Blonde; 199. Dream Lover; 200. Exit Wounds; 201. Wonder Boys; 202. Moonlight Mile; 203. The Seven Per-cent Solution; ♭42. Date with an Angel; ♭43. Minoes; ♭44. Confidences Trop Intimes; ♭45. Lola Rent; Bonus Rumble; About the Creator; Translation Notes
17	June 15, 2007	978-4-06-363838-7	December 13, 2016 (digital)	—
204. Keiner Liebt Mich; 205. Crust; 206. Alien; 207. A Letter to Three Wives; 208. L'Ami de Mon Amie; 209. A Business Affair; 210. Coming to America; 211. Courage Mountain; 212. Heat and Sunlight; 213. The Ice Storm; 214. Strapless; 215. Fantastic Four; 216. We're No Angels; ♭46. Singin' in the Rain; ♭47. American Beauty; ♭48. Blue Crush; ♭49. A Chorus Line; About the Creator; Translation Notes
18	September 14, 2007	978-4-06-363883-7	April 11, 2017 (digital)	—
217. Black Rain; 218. Under Siege 2; 219. Three Kings; 220. The Distinguished Gentlemen; 221. A La Place du Coeur; 222. Stand by Me; 223. Pret a Porter; 224. Panic Room; 225. Amateur; 226. Threesome; 227. The Agony and the Ecstasy; 228. The Hospital; ♭50. Nacho Libre; ♭51. The Postman; ♭52. A Midsummer Night's Dream; About the Creator; Translation Notes
19	December 17, 2007	978-4-06-363924-7	April 25, 2017 (digital)	—
229. Coyote Ugly; 230. The Man in the Iron Mask; 231. On Dangerous Ground; 232. Man's Best Friend; 233. I.Q.; 234. Blindfold; 235. Fantastic Four: Rise of the Silver Surfer; 236. Marathon; 237. Secrets & Lies; 238. La Marge; 239. Butch Cassidy and the Sundance Kid; 240. Some Came Running; 241. Rocketman; ♭53. Lake Placid; ♭54. Ocean's Eleven; ♭55. Birthday Girl; About the Creator; Translation Notes
20	March 17, 2008	978-4-06-363959-9	July 11, 2017 (digital)	—
242. Tor Zum Himmel; 243. Embrace Your Shadow; 244. Subida al Cielo; 245. Planet of the Apes; 246. The Negotiator; 247. Un Fil a La Patte; 248. A Bittersweet Life; 249. Les Baisers; 250. Random Harvest; 251. Casanova Brown; 252. Kiss Kiss, Bang Bang; 253. Radio Days; 254. Hotel Splendide; ♭56. Rembrandt; ♭57. La Vita e Bella; ♭58. The Old Man and the Sea; About the Creator; Translation Notes
21	July 17, 2008	978-4-06-384009-4	July 18, 2017 (digital)	—
♭59. Sgt Kabukiman N.Y.P.D; ♭60. Toy Love; 255. The Bodyguard; 256. Moonstruck; 257. The Accused; 258. You Can't Run Away from it; 259. Total Eclipse; 260. Finders Keepers; 261. It's a Wonderful Life; 262. Universal Soldier; 263. Tragic Hero; 264. Blood Ring; 265. Ransom!; 266. Mad Max; 267. The Fast and the Furious; 268. The Terminal; About the Creator; Translation Notes
22	September 17, 2008	978-4-06-384035-3	August 15, 2017 (digital)	—
♭61. Four Rooms; ♭62. Friends; 269. E La Nave Va; 270. Outlaw Blues; 271. Underworld; 272. Rocky; 273. Far and Away; 274. An Affair to Remember; 275. Sunshine and Showers; 276. Duel in the Sun; 277. Benny & Joon; 278. The Negotiator; 279. On Her Majesty's Secret Service; 280. Tomorrow Never Die; 281. Sister Act 2: Back in the Habit; 282. The Motorcycle Diaries; 283. Class; About the Creator; Translation Notes

=== School Rumble Z ===
Serialization of School Rumble Z began on August 20, 2008, and ended on May 20, 2009.

No.	Japanese release date	Japanese ISBN
1	June 17, 2009	978-4-06-384155-8
♮01. Cat Chaser; ♮02. Van Helsing; ♮03. Tickets; ♮04. Scrooge; ♮05. Michael Clayton; ♮06. The Game; ♮07. Madagascar; ♮08. Secret Society; ♮09. Patch Adams; ♮10. Goodbye Again

== Chapters not yet in tankōbon format ==
- ♭♭01 What's up Doc (February 9, 2010)
- Diamonds on the Inside (November 30, 2016)
- Give it away (March 15, 2017)
- We Are the Champions (November 8, 2017)

== See also ==
- List of School Rumble characters
- List of School Rumble episodes
