= Izumicon =

Anime convention in Oklahoma City, Oklahoma

- Status: Defunct
- Genre: Anime, Gaming, Japanese popular culture
- Venue: Cox Convention Center
- Location: Oklahoma City, Oklahoma
- Coordinates: 35°27′55″N 97°30′52″W
- Country: United States
- Inaugurated: 2007
- Most recent: 2017
- Attendance: 1,026 total in 2008
- Organizer: Ladder Entertainment LLC

Izumicon was an annual three-day anime convention held during January at the Cox Convention Center in Oklahoma City, Oklahoma.

== Programming ==
The convention typically offered an artist's alley, dealers room, formal masquerade ball, gaming tournaments, maid cafe, rave, and video game room.

== History ==
Marlon Stodghill was one of the conventions founders. During later legal action, Monica Rial accused fellow voice actor Vic Mignogna of inappropriate behavior that occurred at the 2007 convention. Snow/ice occurred during the first day of the 2017 convention and it severely affected attendance. Prior to the planned 2018 convention, Izumicon was sold by Dyad LLC to Ladder Entertainment LLC and changed venues to the Reed Conference Center. Several guests cancelled prior to the convention, with Izumicon officially cancelling the event in mid-August due to various issues. Those issues included most of the director level staff resigning and the convention having significant financial issues.

=== Event history ===
Dates	Location	Atten.	Guests
November 2–4, 2007	Biltmore Hotel Oklahoma; Oklahoma City, Oklahoma	1,012	Greg Ayres, Chris Cason, Leah Clark, Colleen Clinkenbeard, Heather Martin, Jason Martin, Vic Mignogna, Brina Palencia, Monica Rial, Christopher Sabat, and David L. Williams.
November 21–23, 2008	Sheraton Midwest City at the Reed Conference Center; Oklahoma City, Oklahoma	1,026	Laura Bailey, Emily DeJesus, Robert DeJesus, Monica Rial, Rikki Simons, David L. Williams, Travis Willingham, and Tavisha Wolfgarth-Simons.
November 13–15, 2009	The Reed Center; Midwest City, Oklahoma		Vic Mignogna, Trina Nishimura, Brina Palencia, and David L. Williams.
November 12–14, 2010	The Reed Center; Midwest City, Oklahoma		Troy Baker, Todd Haberkorn, Samantha Inoue-Harte, Jamie Marchi, Trina Nishimura, SHEawase, and David L. Williams.
November 11–13, 2011	The Reed Center; Midwest City, Oklahoma		Christine Auten, Samantha Inoue-Harte, Vic Mignogna, Doug Smith, and David L. Williams.
November 9–11, 2012	Sheraton Midwest City Hotel at the Reed Conference Center; Midwest City, Oklahoma		Johnny Yong Bosch, Eyeshine, Lisa Ortiz, and Doug Smith.
November 1–3, 2013	Renaissance Oklahoma City Convention Center Hotel; Oklahoma City, Oklahoma		Johnny Yong Bosch, Eyeshine, Moon Stream, Bryce Papenbrook, Persica, Stephanie Sheh, and Michael Sinterniklaas.
October 31 – November 2, 2014	Cox Convention Center; Oklahoma City, Oklahoma		Dante Basco, Quinton Flynn, Christopher Sabat, and Janet Varney.
October 30 – November 1, 2015	Cox Convention Center; Oklahoma City, Oklahoma		Johnny Yong Bosch, Leah Clark, Eyeshine, Sandy Fox, heidi., Richard Horvitz, Samantha Inoue-Harte, Lex Lang, Rachael Messer, Hatsune Miku, Tyson Rinehart, Jad Saxton, David Vincent, and Vitamin H Productions.
January 6–8, 2017	Cox Convention Center; Oklahoma City, Oklahoma		Caitlin Glass, Jennifer Hale, Joe Inoue, Kazha, Erica Mendez, Rob Paulsen, and Sarah Anne Williams.

== See also ==
- Kawaii Kon
- Tokyo, OK
