= Natsu no Arashi! =

Japanese manga series

- Cover of Natsu no Arashi! volume 1

夏のあらし!
- Genre: Romantic comedy, supernatural
- Manga
- Written by: Jin Kobayashi
- Published by: Square Enix
- Magazine: Monthly Gangan Wing; Monthly Gangan Joker
- Original run: August 25, 2006 – September 22, 2010
- Volumes: 8
- Anime television series
- Directed by: Akiyuki Shinbo; Shin Oonuma (Note: Credited as Series Director (シリーズディレクター, Shirīzu Direkutā). In the series, Oonuma is only credited up until episode 7 of the second season. Episodes 8 through 13 don't credit a series director; however, according to Shaft's official website, Oonuma was replaced by Ishikura, albeit uncredited.)
- Produced by: Junnosuke Miyamoto
- Written by: Katsuhiko Takayama
- Music by: Ken Sato
- Studio: Shaft
- Licensed by: NA: Maiden Japan
- Original network: TV Tokyo, TV Osaka, TV Aichi, TV Hokkaido, TV Setouchi, TVQ Kyūshū
- Original run: April 5, 2009 – June 29, 2009
- Episodes: 13
- Anime television series

Natsu no Arashi! Akinai-chū
- Directed by: Akiyuki Shinbo; Shin Oonuma (#1–7); Kenichi Ishikura (#8–13)
- Produced by: Junnosuke Miyamoto
- Written by: Katsuhiko Takayama
- Music by: Ken Sato
- Studio: Shaft
- Original network: TV Tokyo, TV Osaka, TV Aichi, TV Hokkaido, TV Setouchi, TVQ Kyūshū
- Original run: October 4, 2009 – December 27, 2009
- Episodes: 13
- icon

Natsu no Arashi! (Japanese: 夏のあらし!; lit. "Summer Storm!") is a Japanese manga written and illustrated by Jin Kobayashi. The manga was serialized in Square Enix's Gangan Wing shōnen manga magazine from August 2006 to September 2010, with its chapters collected in eight bound volumes. Natsu no Arashi! was also adapted into two anime television series by Shaft under the direction of Akiyuki Shinbo, Shin Oonuma, and Kenichi Ishikura and broadcast in Japan from April 5, 2009, to December 27, 2009. Maiden Japan licensed the series for US release on November 12, 2019, on Blu-ray.

== Plot ==
Thirteen-year-old Yasaka is a boy staying at his grandfather's house during his summer vacation. One day he entered a store and met Arashi, a beautiful sixteen-year-old girl working there. After trying to protect her from a man who claims to have been hired by her family to take her back by force, Yasaka ran away with her and now she stays at his grandpa's place with him. It didn't take much time for Yasaka to figure out that his new friend is far from an ordinary girl, as she possesses mysterious powers. The plot thickens when he finds a sixty-year-old picture of Arashi and another girl named Kaja, and to the surprise of all Kaja suddenly appears, and just like Arashi, her appearance hasn't changed at all since then.

Two other characters introduced so far are the place's owner, a woman whose name is still unrevealed and rumored to be a high level con artist, and Jun Kamigamo, a student of Yasaka's age whom he met at the store, and works there with him since then. Despite being a girl, she keeps dressing and addressing herself as a boy to the other characters. So far only Kaja and Arashi know her secret.

== Characters ==
Hajime Yasaka (八坂 一, Yasaka Hajime)
Voiced by: Yūko Sanpei
The main male protagonist. A 13-year-old boy who is spending his summer vacation in his grandfather's house. When he met Arashi from the first time, he established a connection with her when he touched her hand, and since then the duo gained the power to travel back and forth in time. He is infatuated with Arashi's beauty and kindness, but is afraid to convey his feelings to her. He is a friend of Jun.
Sayoko Arashiyama (嵐山 小夜子, Arashiyama Sayoko; Arashi for short)
Voiced by: Ryōko Shiraishi
The main female protagonist. Despite still looking like a beautiful sixteen-year-old girl, Arashi is in fact a ghost who lived during World War II times. Since then her mission had been traveling back in time to rescue those in her community from air raids by American warplanes. However, to travel back to the past, she must do it accompanied by a living person from the present with whom she made a "connection". Her relationship with Hajime is a bit more complicated than it seems.
In the second season it is revealed that Arashi's first love was a time-tripping Hajime.
Kaja Bergmann (カヤ バーグマン, Kaya Bāguman)
Voiced by: Kaori Nazuka
Another ghost from Arashi's time and her best friend. She was an exchange student from Germany who studied at her school. Her polite and cool demeanor opposes to Arashi's lively and carefree personality. She possesses the same time travelling powers as her, but she can only make a connection with a living girl due to her shyness around boys.
Her favorite dessert is ice cream.
Jun Kamigamo (上賀茂 潤, Kamigamo Jun)
Voiced by: Chiaki Omigawa
She is Hajime's friend that has made a connection with Kaja and jumps through time with her. Hajime misunderstands that she is a guy. In the second season Jun starts to have feeling for Hajime.
In the first season Her secret was revealed in episode 5.
She used to have long hair which showed in the anime and she has great acting skills.
Sayaka (さやか, Sayaka)
Voiced by: Hitomi Nabatame
A con artist who owns (more like uses, the cafe is abandoned in the manga) the cafe in which Hajime, Arashi and the other girls work. She seems to have a crush on Yamashiro. Her grandfather was a foreign soldier, giving her the appearance of a westerner which became a source of grief throughout her past. She lost her family early, making her an orphan.
Hideo Murata (村田 英雄, Murata Hideo)
Voiced by: Hiroki Yasumoto
A private investigator. He is the son of a man Arashi saved from certain death by preventing him from fishing in the river, on a day when an air-raid struck the area. He loses his right eye when he defended his family from yakuza, for unknown reason. He became butler for Kanako and Yayoi and energy-source for Kanako after their conflict with Arashi and co. solved.
Yayoi Fushimi (伏見 やよゐ, Fushimi Yayoi)
Voiced by: Ai Nonaka
Just like her friend Kanako, she is another ghost who died during the war and an acquaintance of Arashi and Kaja, her ethereal body has been weakening through time. Due to a horrifying accident, she's half-paralyzed and can't walk without wheelchair. Her paralysis is more to psychological condition. However, she was healed when she went back to the past and met Kanako again for the first time. Her personality is the polar opposite of Kanako, especially her naiveness that worries Kanako greatly.
In the second season she connects with both Hajime and Yamashiro's dog Josephine and Sayaka.
Kanako Yamazaki (山崎 加奈子, Yamazaki Kanako)
Voiced by: Yui Horie
Just like Yayoi, her ethereal body weakened and she resorted to steal Arashi's energy to replace her and her friend's, until she figured out that only by making a connection with a living human, her energy would be restored. She and Yayoi are best friends and spent their ghost-living in a run-down mansion. She is very protective and deeply cared of Yayoi's well-being, up to the point where she does not hesitant to hurt somebody for her sake. She is "connected" with Hideo. She looked tough, rude, and unlikeable at first. This is because she had gone through a lot of hardships since childhood and loathes rich girls such as Kaja, Arashi, and Yayoi. Her encounter with Yayoi changed her perspective and she became able to open up herself.
Takeshi Yamashiro (山代 武士, Yamashiro Takeshi)
Voiced by: Tomokazu Sugita
A young man who Arashi saved when he was a child and Hajime's main target of jealousy, as he is always in good terms with her. He is handsome, smart, nice, godd-natured, and comes from wealthy family, which makes "Perfect Man" and this fact nerves Hajime. Former Teen Rebel, until Yayoi met him in time travel 10 years' prior the series.
Shioya (塩谷)
Voiced by: Tomokazu Sugita
A regular at the cafe who always asks for salt, but never gets it till the end of the second season.
Kazuo Sogoru (十五流 一夫, Sogoru Kazuo)
Voiced by: Tomokazu Sugita
Yoko Himekawa (姫川 ようこ, Himekawa Yōko)
Voiced by: Saki Nakajima
Jun's modeling friend. She pretends to be Jun's girlfriend to get a laugh, and then pretends that Jun is cheating on her as to amuse herself even further.
Kyoko Kamigamo (上賀茂 京子, Kamigamo Kyōko)
Voiced by: Michiko Neya
Jun's older sister. She is a model too.
Yoshimi Anamori (穴守 好実, Anamori Yoshimi)
Voiced by: Yū Kobayashi
She's a manga artist who, on her first visit to Seven, tries to kiss Yayoi and Arashi. It's revealed that she's actually looking for models and has to 'experience' the scene in order to draw it correctly.
Umeyashiki (梅屋敷)
Voiced by: Ami Koshimizu

== Media ==
=== Anime ===
In November 2008, an anime adaption of Natsu no Arashi! was announced. The anime series was produced by Shaft, directed by Akiyuki Shinbo and Shin Oonuma, with Katsuhiko Takayama acting as series composition writer and Kazuhiro Oota (Shaft) designing the characters for animation. Oota and Yoshiaki Itou (Shaft) served as chief animation directors, and Ken Sato composed the music. The series was broadcast from April 5, 2009, it had a total of 13 episodes. Of its 12 episodes, 6 were produced in-house at Shaft, while 7 were outsourced: episodes 3, 5, 9, and 11–13 to Studio Pastoral; and episode 10 to Mushi Production. (Note: All outsourcing studios credited in the ending to their respective episodes as Animation Production Assistance (アニメーション制作協力).)

Four pieces of theme music are used during the first season—one opening theme, one closing theme and two special closing themes for episodes six and eleven. The opening theme is "Atashi dake ni kakete" (あたしだけにかけて) by Omokage Lucky Hole and the closing theme is "Kirari Futari" (キラリフタリ) by Ryōko Shiraishi. For episode six, the closing theme is "Hitonatsu no Keiken" (ひと夏の経験) by Ryōko Shiraishi and the closing theme for episode 11 is "Kassai" (喝采) by Yui Horie.

A second season, called Natsu no Arashi! Akinai-chū (夏のあらし! 春夏冬中; lit. Summer Storm! Open for Business) was announced in June 2009. Most of the main staff returned, including director Shinbo, series composition writer Takayama, character designer and chief animation director Oota, and music composer Sato. Itou did not return as Oota's co-chief animation director, and Oonuma acted as series director for only the first seven episodes. Kenichi Ishikura replaced Oonuma for the final six episodes. Only episode 8 was produced in-house at Shaft, while the rest were outsourced: episodes 1, 3, 6–7, 10–11, and 13 to Studio Pastoral; episode 2 to Studio Pastoral and Anime R; episode 4 to Studio Pastoral and Mushi Production; episode 9 to Mushi Production; and episodes 5 and 12 to Studio Izena.

Two pieces of theme music were used during its broadcast. The opening theme is "Oyasumi Paradox" (おやすみパラドックス) by Etsuko Yakushimaru and the closing theme is "Otome no Junjo" (乙女の順序) by Ryōko Shiraishi, Kaori Nazuka, Ai Nonaka and Yui Horie.

Both seasons were simulcasted to English language audiences by the video streaming website Crunchyroll.

==== Season 1 ====
No.	Title	Directed by (Note: Information is taken from the ending credits of each episode.)	Written by	Storyboarded by	Original release date
1	"Playback Part 2" "Pureibakku Part2" (プレイバックPart2)	Shin Oonuma	Katsuhiko Takayama	Hiroyuki Shimazu	April 5, 2009
On a very auspicious summer day, first year middle school student Hajime Yasaka was making a small prank bomb for his school's "research project," and from its appearance it looked very much like an actual piece of strawberry. However inside the cherry bomb, it was filled with a large variety and amount of hot spices to be exploded once lit. Planning to put in on a strawberry cake and giving it to a classmate whom he did not get along with, Yasaka did not keep an eye on the strawberry bomb and the fuse was lit.
2	"Girl A" "Shōjo A" (少女A)	Shin Oonuma	Katsuhiko Takayama	Shuuji Miyazaki	April 12, 2009
Yasaka Hajime came to the countryside to spend his summer holiday at his grandfather's house. After losing his way, he decided to take a break at a local coffee shop. He meets Arashi, an older girl who is a waitress there, and was completely taken aback by her. Casually, he took a seat next to another local student, Kamigano Jun, and started talking to him about how wonderful Arashi is. Unknown to Hajime, a figure with a scary face hidden behind sunglasses entered. Calling himself a private investigator, he informed them what he was looking for and then kidnapped Arashi. Hajime, who watched the scene, grabbed Arashi's hand and ran with her. Arashi used her power to time-travel with Hajime's energy. Then, he brought her to statayed at his grandfather's house.
3	"Wanting to Protect" "Mamotte Agetai" (守ってあげたい)	Yoshihiro Mori	Katsuhiko Takayama	Yoshihiro Mori	April 19, 2009
Hajime and Arashi are flashed back to a world of the past and Arashi still cannot believe that she is a ghost. Now, even though weird things are happening at work, all Arashi could do was think about what had recently happened. In the meantime, Hajime advises Jun that there it's strange that a freeloader has all of a sudden appeared and that they should keep a close eye on her, as Arashi becomes increasingly more immersed in her thoughts about earlier.
4	"Full of Memories" "Omoide ga Ippai" (想い出がいっぱい)	Kenichi Ishikura	Masahiro Yokotani	Kenichi Ishikura	April 26, 2009
Knowing Arashi's secret and power, Hajime swears to keep it a secret, even though Arashi still doesn't believe that she's a ghost. One day, Hajime and crew decided to take some photos of this black-haired girl to be the lead in an independent movie with the help of some other students. Hajime and Jun go along with Arashi to a photo shop and after examining an old wartime photo they discover it is a photo of Arashi, Kaya, and some another blond haired girl.
5	"Secret Flower Garden" "Himitsu no hanazono" (秘密の花園)	Shuuji Miyazaki	Katsuhiko Takayama	Shuuji Miyazaki	May 3, 2009
Sixty years ago, Kaya and Arashi were friends. She, like Arashi, has the ability to travel in time. Hajime watches on as they are delighted and overflowing with excitement upon meeting again in the same coffee house. However, Jun's shenanigans puts Hajime in somewhat of a foul mood.
6	"Falling In Love" "Koi ni Ochite" (恋におちて)	Masayuki Iimura	Deko Akao	Masayuki Iimura	May 10, 2009
It seems as if girls always give Jun a cold shoulder or look away whenever he gets close to them. Kaya provides little sympathy to Jun's plight, however she takes his hand and the next moment they are flashing back in time to 1945 (20th year in the Showa period). However, upon doing this, Jun must reveal and come face to face with a secret he's been hiding.
7	"An Outsider's Relation" "Tanin no Kankei" (他人の関係)	Shin Oonuma	Deko Akao	Hiroyuki Shimazu	May 17, 2009
Kaya questions Jun and asks her whether or not she should keep up this masquerade of pretending to be a boy. In the meantime, Arashi and Hajime create some makeshift baseball gear. With all his might, Hajime hurls a ball towards Arashi, who nails it right out of the park...and breaks the weather vane above the coffee house. The weather vane, we later learn is from the prewar days, which brings back a lot of memories to Arashi and Kaya.
8	"Suit Yourself" "Katte ni Shiyagare" (勝手にしやがれ)	Kenichi Ishikura	Katsuhiko Takayama	Kenichi Ishikura	May 24, 2009
On their way back from buying a bunch of watermelon, Hajime and Jun decide to take a break at a nearby Shinto Shrine. They spot a vending machine but only have enough money to buy one drink. Hajime suggests that they share it. However, Jun thinks that it would be like having an indirect kiss with him and refuses. Hajime gets the wrong idea and tries to force Jun to drink it, causing them to tumble down the stairs. They both get up without injury, but now they're in each others bodies.
9	"Hero - Now's the Time for You to Become a Hero!" "Hero - Hīrō ni Naru Toki, Sore wa Ima" (HERO(ヒーローになる時、それは今))	Shin Oonuma	Katsuhiko Takayama	Shuuji Miyazaki	May 31, 2009
At the Ark Coffee Shop, the owner makes a special request to everyone. She asks them to travel back into time and bring back non-expired mackerel sushi so that she can eat it. Kaya strongly opposes to such a ridiculous request, while Jun states that if you have the ability to go back you can essentially do anything. This causes a huge debate on the ethics of time travel and changing history and if they were to jump back to an altered reality.
10	"Stranger" "Ihōjin" (異邦人)	Yasuo Iwamoto	Deko Akao	Yoshihiro Mori	June 7, 2009
As their work is coming to an end, Arashi and Hajime run into Yamazaki Kanako. Kanako suddenly stabs Arashi's chest with her hand, causing her power to drain out. As Hajime is about to leap in to save her, he realizes that there's a crossbow pointed directly at him. Unable to take it as Kanako is progressively weakens Arashi, Hajime - throwing caution to the wind - tries to attack Kanako...and she pulls the crossbow trigger. The arrow fires off barely missing Hajime. With little options left, in steps the man with the sunglasses.
11	"The World Exist For the Sake of Two" "Sekai wa Futari no Tame ni" (世界は二人のために)	Yoshihiro Mori	Deko Akao	Yoshihiro Mori	June 14, 2009
In an attempt to save Arashi after she has her powers sucked up, Hajime and the man with the sunglasses creep into Kanako's residence. However, they could not get past Kanako's watchful eye as they fell under her attacks. While avoiding Kanako's attacks and knives, Hajime comes into contact with Yayoi and both are sent back in time to the middle of the war. They touchdown on a hill on the outskirts of town, where at that time, Yayoi first met Kanako.
12	"Entrust Yourself to the Flow of Time" "Toki no Nagare ni Mi o Makase" (時の流れに身をまかせ)	Masayuki Iimura	Katsuhiko Takayama	Yuuichi Nakazawa	June 21, 2009
As Arashi starts to become more conscious, Kanako and Yayoi are must try even harder to maintain their presence and restore their energy to stay alive. However, they are fading as Arashi is gaining more energy. Kanako and Yayoi apologize for trying to take away Arashi's energy, and accept the punishments associated with such an act. However, Arashi, Kaya, Jun and Hajime join hands and find a way to divide the power they have to maintaining Kanako and Yayoi...but will it work?
13	"Playback Part 1" "Pureibakku Part1" (プレイバックPart1)	Shin Oonuma	Katsuhiko Takayama	Shin Oonuma	June 28, 2009
A particular summer day, when Arashi is finally revived back, Hajime must find a solution to his cherry bomb, summer school project. However, on the way the Ark, Arashi decides to change the name of the bomb to "Cutie Cherry Chan" bomb. Embarrassed by the name, Hajime implicitly opposes it, however Arashi has her way in the end and changes the name. Upon arrival to the Ark, they place the "Cutie Cherry Chan" on a small plate, satisfied with the way it looks. Hearing a female's voice calling out "Akagi Keiichiro," Hajime turns to where the voice came from and comes face to face with...

==== Season 2: Akinai-chū ====
No.	Title	Directed by	Written by	Storyboarded by	Original release date
1	"Summer Vacation" "Natsuyasumi" (夏休み)	Shin Oonuma	Katsuhiko Takayama	Shin Oonuma	October 4, 2009
The group decides to go to the beach for fun and Jun gets embarrassed about Hajime finding out she's a girl. Kaya falls in the water by accident, Jun saves her and Arashi finds out that Jun is a girl.
2	"Gyarandu" "Gyarandū" (ギャランドゥ)	Kenichi Ishikura	Katsuhiko Takayama	Yuuichi Nakazawa	October 11, 2009
3	"The Time Traveling Girl" "Toki o Kakeru Shōjo" (時をかける少女)	Yoshihiro Mori	Katsuhiko Takayama	Yoshihiro Mori	October 18, 2009
4	"Light Blue Rain" "Mizuiro no Ame" (みずいろの雨)	Yasuo Iwamoto (Note: Assisted by Souichi Shimada.)	Deko Akao	Yasuo Iwamoto	October 25, 2009
5	"Can't Stop the Romance" "Romantikku ga Tomaranai" (Romanticが止まらない)	Susumu Endou	Deko Akao	Akira Takamura	November 1, 2009
6	"Jagged Heart Lullaby" "Gizagiza Hāto no Komoriuta" (ギザギザハートの子守唄)	Yoshihiro Mori (Note: Assisted by Susumu Endou.)	Deko Akao	Masayuki Iimura	November 8, 2009
7	"Amagigoe" "Amagigoe" (天城越え)	Naoyuki Tatsuwa	Deko Akao	Yuuichi Nakazawa	November 15, 2009
8	"Computer Granny" "Konpyūtā Obāchan" (コンピューターおばあちゃん)	Kenichi Ishikura (Note: Assisted by Susumu Endou and Masanori Takahashi.)	Sumio Uetake	Kenichi Ishikura	November 22, 2009
9	"Lonely Tropical Fish" "Samishii Nettaigyo" (淋しい熱帯魚)	Yasuo Iwamoto	Katsuhiko Takayama	Shinichi Omata	November 29, 2009
10	"Showa Blues" "Shōwa Burūsu" (昭和ブルース)	Masayuki Iimura	Katsuhiko Takayama	Masayuki Iimura	December 6, 2009
11	"High School Lullaby" "Haisukūru Rarabai" (ハイスクールララバイ)	Yoshihiro Mori	Katsuhiko Takayama	Yoshihiro Mori	December 13, 2009
12	"Radarman" "Rēdāman" (レーダーマン)	Susumu Endou	Jin Kobayashi	Jin Kobayashi	December 20, 2009
13	"You guys are Kiwi, Papaya, and Mango" "Kimi-tachi Kiui. Papaia. Mangō da ne." (君たちキウイ・パパイア・マンゴーだね。)	Kenichi Ishikura	Katsuhiko Takayama	Naoyuki Tatsuwa	December 27, 2009
