= School Rumble =

Japanese manga series and franchise

- 13th tankōbon volume cover, featuring Kenji Harima and Tenma Tsukamoto

スクールランブル (Sukūru Ranburu)
- Genre: Romantic comedy
- Manga
- Written by: Jin Kobayashi
- Published by: Kodansha
- English publisher: BI: Tanoshimi; NA: Kodansha USA (digital); Del Rey Manga (former)
- Imprint: Shōnen Magazine Comics
- Magazine: Weekly Shōnen Magazine; Magazine Special; Shōnen Magazine Wonder
- Original run: October 23, 2002 – May 20, 2009
- Volumes: 23
- Series titles
- 1. School Rumble (2002–08, 22 volumes); 2. School Rumble Z (2008–09, 1 volume)
- Anime television series
- Directed by: Shinji Takamatsu
- Produced by: Bunpei Ogawa; Fukashi Azuma; Hidenori Itahashi
- Written by: Hiroko Tokita
- Music by: Toshiyuki Omori
- Studio: Studio Comet
- Licensed by: AUS: Madman Entertainment; NA: Funimation; UK: Revelation Films
- Original network: TV Tokyo
- English network: US: Funimation Channel
- Original run: October 5, 2004 – March 29, 2005
- Episodes: 26
- Original video animation

School Rumble: Extra Class
- Directed by: Shinji Takamatsu
- Produced by: Bunpei Ogawa; Akihiro Sekiyama
- Written by: Hiroko Tokita
- Music by: Toshiyuki Omori
- Studio: Studio Comet
- Licensed by: AUS: Madman Entertainment; NA: Funimation; UK: Revelation Films
- Released: December 22, 2005
- Episodes: 2
- Anime television series

School Rumble: 2nd Semester
- Directed by: Takaomi Kanasaki
- Produced by: Bunpei Ogawa; Hidenori Itahashi
- Written by: Hiroko Tokita
- Music by: Toshiyuki Omori
- Studio: Studio Comet
- Licensed by: AUS: Madman Entertainment; NA: Funimation; UK: Revelation Films
- Original network: TV Tokyo
- English network: US: Funimation Channel
- Original run: April 3, 2006 – September 25, 2006
- Episodes: 26
- Original video animation

School Rumble: 3rd Semester
- Directed by: Shinji Takamatsu
- Produced by: Bunpei Ogawa; Kensuke Tateishi; Masakazu Yoshimoto; Motohiro Nakata; Ryoichi Suzuki
- Written by: Hiroko Tokita
- Music by: Toshiyuki Omori
- Studio: Studio Comet
- Released: July 17, 2008 – September 17, 2008
- Episodes: 2

School Rumble (Japanese: スクールランブル, Hepburn: Sukūru Ranburu) is a Japanese manga series written and illustrated by Jin Kobayashi. It was serialized in Kodansha's shōnen manga magazine Weekly Shōnen Magazine from October 2002 to July 2008, with its chapters collected in 22 tankōbon volumes. Magazine Special published School Rumble Z monthly from August 2008 to May 2009, with its chapters collected in a single volume. School Rumble is a romance comedy centering on relationships between Japanese high school students. The story focuses on a love triangle involving the series' two protagonists, Tenma Tsukamoto and Kenji Harima, and one of their classmates, Oji Karasuma. The series often discards realism in favor of comedic effect.

School Rumble's popularity has resulted in its adaptation into multiple forms of media. TV Tokyo broadcast a 26-episode anime program between October 2004 and April 2005. In December 2005, a two-part original video animation (OVA) entitled School Rumble: Extra Class was released. A second season, School Rumble: 2nd Semester, aired between April and September 2006. Finally, two more episodes, collectively entitled School Rumble: Third Semester, were released in 2008. Three video games have been produced, two light novels, and four official guidebooks.

In North America, Del Rey Manga published the English translation of the first 16 volumes of School Rumble in physical format. In the translation, Del Rey Manga maintained the traditional Japanese name order (Note: In Japan, family name is listed first followed by a given name. Japanese traditionally do not have middle names.) to preserve puns based on the characters' names. Kodansha USA published the English translation in digital format. Funimation published the first and second anime seasons and the Extra Class OVAs in English.

The manga was well received by Japanese-language readers; several volumes have appeared in the top manga sales charts. The North American English translations were less popular, but still ranked several times in the top 100 as well as ranking 145th for overall manga series sales in 2008. Critics of the English-language translation have been positive overall, praising Kobayashi for his art style and overall use of humor. However, the manga has received some criticism, mostly centered on some of the jokes and repetitive plot. The anime adaptation also sold well in Japan and was praised by Kobayashi and—for the English-language translation—critics. The decision by Media Factory to aggressively pursue its intellectual property rights for School Rumble is believed by proponents of fansubs to have had a negative impact on the franchise's release and sales in the North American market.

== Plot ==
School Rumble revolves around the daily lives of the students of Class 2-C at the fictional Yagami High School, along with their friends and families. Tenma Tsukamoto, a cheerful yet unremarkable second-year high school student, has an obsessive crush on her eccentric, enigmatic classmate, Oji Karasuma. Tenma struggles to confess her feelings to Karasuma, not only because he is listless and borderline-antisocial, but also because his only fulfillment comes in eating curry. Unbeknownst to her, Tenma herself has an admirer, Kenji Harima. A recovering truant and delinquent, Harima attends school solely to get close to her, and even begins creatively expressing himself as a manga artist, but he has similar difficulty declaring his love due to Tenma's dimwittedness and single-minded ambition, and whenever he summons the courage to do so, circumstances and his own bumbling conspire against him. Many of these instances, also result in Harima finding himself in mutually embarrassing situations with one of Tenma's best friends, Eri Sawachika, causing the two to form a tense relationship. Eri, the richest and most coveted girl in her grade who lives a duplicitous lifestyle and yearns for companionship that her father is unable to provide, finds Harima initially to be a creep as a result of these situations; however, they end up becoming unlikely friends, and Eri finds herself falling in love with him, although she frivolously denies this. The series predominantly revolves around Tenma and Harima's ill-fated attempts to confess their feelings, and how they each grow as people in spite of their failures.

In addition to the four main characters, numerous other characters also have their own side adventures and romances. This includes Tenma and Eri's other best friends, Mikoto Suou and Akira Takano. While Akira - an extremely perceptive yet mischievous girl - largely stays out of all potential romantic drama, Mikoto, an athletic and friendly girl who attends a kenpo dojo, yearns for an upperclassman until he goes off to college and develops a relationship with a girl there. However, this belies the mutual affection she holds for her childhood friend and classmate, the uptight class representative Haruki Hanai, whose father runs the dojo. Similarly, Hanai is romantically obsessed with Tenma's younger sister, Yakumo Tsukamoto, a first-year at Yagami. In contrast to Tenma, Yakumo is mild-mannered, tall in stature, and highly talented, which soon causes her to supplant Eri as the school idol. However, Yakumo's timidness and androphobia cause her to avoid most men until she meets Harima, who she does not get any romantic vibes from due to his sole desire for Tenma, and ironically ends up falling for him as a result, which ends up causing Hanai and an oblivious Harima to develop a rivalry as well as Eri and Yakumo.

Although Harima manages to engineer romantic encounters with Tenma, her relationship with Karasuma nevertheless progresses, and Harima's bonds with Eri and Yakumo grow stronger. Eventually Tenma musters the courage to confess her love, but while he reciprocates, shortly after Karasuma loses his memory. His amnesia gives a purpose to Tenma's life; she concentrates on her studies to become a doctor and help Karasuma, half-heartedly turning down Harima at their graduation ceremony as a result. Epilogue chapters following the manga's conclusion, predominantly in the "parallel comedy" School Rumble Z, reveal events that happen in the adult lives of the characters. Karasuma still suffers from memory loss but is in a relationship with Tenma; additionally, Mikoto marries Hanai and Harima marries Eri, with the former couple expecting a child and the latter couple presenting their own child to Tenma and Yakumo.

== Development and production ==
Jin Kobayashi began writing School Rumble, his debut work, in 2002. (Note: In an interview with Kaori Shimizu, Kobayashi notes he started writing School Rumble four years previously. The volume was released in 2003, and the interview was taped around the time of the release of the Japanese volume 15 (although not released until 2007 on Japanese DVD).) He stated to an audience at Honolulu's 2006 Kawaii Kon convention that he started writing the series because he found the idea of a manga involving a delinquent falling in love interesting. Kobayashi's favorite character, Kenji Harima, is based largely on an amalgam of various friends, although he estimates "about 30%" of Harima is a reflection of himself. However, despite putting most of his personal feelings into the female characters, he stated that Ryuuhei Suga, a minor supporting character, is the most autobiographical. Most of the other characters are based on memories of former high-school classmates; Kobayashi recalled that he had no real idea of their voices when drawing them, and it was not until much later, when he heard the voice actors' interpretations during the production of the anime series, that he knew how they should sound. He acknowledged that some characters are more developed than others; in reply to a fan question about the mysterious Akira Takano, he admitted that, despite the closeness he feels for her, he did not put much emphasis on Takano and planned to develop her love-life slowly. Kobayashi intentionally centered his story arcs around misunderstandings which he then resolves, since he believes "if there's no misunderstanding then there's no funny story." He claims that none of his stories are based on real-life events, although when pressed admits the possibility of some resemblances but without divulging specific details.

Kobayashi and his editors collaborated on the plotlines. Kobayashi would then draw the basic illustrations for each chapter before passing his material to assistants to finish. As the series' manga artist, Kobayashi also designed the cover art. Originally, the fifth volume's front cover was to feature Akira Takano, but after re-reading the volume Kobayashi concluded that since much of its plot in that volume revolves around Karen Ichijo, she should be on the cover instead. Desiring to feature a male character, he placed Harima on the cover of volume six. Kobayashi designed a poster to commemorate the ending of the series with the final chapter of School Rumble Z.

An anime adaptation of the series was never envisaged by Kobayashi, and he was skeptical of the project when first approached. Negotiations and preparation took some time, but he claims to be happy with the result. On viewing the first anime footage, Kobayashi was astonished; he recalls in an interview his emotions at the time, stating "I was incredibly touched by it. Completely overcome." Impressed with the adaptation of his work, he praises the anime staff for their achievement, although conceding that School Rumble probably lent itself to the anime format. He cites the fishing episode, for which he supplied the voice acting for several minor parts, as his favorite. (Note: The episode is 25 of School Rumble: First Semester. The interview took place before the final two episodes in Third Semester were produced.)

Kobayashi allowed the voice actors who voiced his characters significant freedom to interpret them as they chose. There were a number of cast changes throughout the production; Ami Koshimizu, the voice actress for Tenma, had initially auditioned for the role of Yakumo, and between School Rumble's first and second seasons the voice actors for both Karen Ichijo and Yoko Sasakura were replaced. Mako Sakurai took over Karen's role from Yuuka Nanri, and Aya Hirano replaced Akiko Kurumado as Yoko.

The artbox design for Funimation's North American release of the School Rumble anime resembles a miniature metal locker, and each of the individually released DVDs comes with heavy duty magnets. The discs include subtitled interviews with the Japanese voice actors, which were compiled onto a third DVD for the full first season release. In 2007, Funimation ran a drawing contest prior to releasing the anime in North America. The grand prize included a new computer with software for developing anime and manga. The United Kingdom anime release by Revelation Films saw the same limited edition box as Funimation, along with two standard editions.

In 2009, Kobayashi said "School Rumble is an important piece that I want to draw more, but I wanted to do more other things so I ended it. When I have some time, I would like to draw their adult days in a seinen magazine."

== Media ==
=== Manga ===
Written and illustrated by Jin Kobayashi, School Rumble debuted in Kodansha's shōnen manga magazine Weekly Shōnen Magazine on October 23, 2002, and finished on July 23, 2008. It further appeared in issues of Shōnen Magazine's Magazine Special, and comprised one chapter of the seasonal Shōnen Magazine Wonder (少年マガジンワンダー). Kodansha collected its chapters in 22 tankōbon volumes, released from May 16, 2003, to September 17, 2008. Another series, School Rumble Z, was serialized in Magazine Special from August 20, 2008, to May 20, 2009. Concluding the series, a compiled volume was released on June 17, 2009. A special chapter of the manga was published on Weekly Shōnen Magazine on November 30, 2016.

As a guide to the contents of each chapter, musical notations were added before the chapter number. In School Rumble, chapters marked with a sharp sign (♯) concern the main plot development focusing around Tenma and Harima, while side stories dealing with supporting characters are indicated by a flat sign (♭). The one exception to this pattern in the first series is the chapter that appears in Shōnen Magazine Wonder, which uses the natural sign (♮). School Rumble Z uses the natural sign for every chapter. The manga volumes of School Rumble contain original bonus chapters that use no musical notation; these are normally one page in length, but the seventh volume spreads its bonus chapter over several pages with each page telling a self-contained story.

Del Rey Manga, in North America, and Tanoshimi in the United Kingdom licensed School Rumble for an English-language release. It has also been translated into other languages, although the German-language release which Tokyopop initially published was cancelled and later continued by Egmont Manga & Anime. Del Rey released the first English-language volume on February 28, 2006, and the latest—volumes 14-16 in an omnibus—on July 27, 2010. Following Kodansha's lead, the Del Rey translation places the main plot chapters first followed by the side stories. Del Rey also retained the Japanese naming order to preserve puns and humor involving the names of the characters. The manga ceased to be published in North America after Del Rey became defunct. Kodansha released 13 volumes of the manga digitally on iTunes on July 26, 2016. As of August 2017, all 22 volumes of the main series have been published digitally in English by Kodansha.

=== Anime ===
TV Tokyo adapted the School Rumble manga for two 26-episode television sketch show series, and five additional episodes. The first season was broadcast in Japan from October 10, 2004 to March 29, 2005, followed by two original video animation (OVA) episodes entitled School Rumble: Extra Class (スクールランブルOVA一学期補習, School Rumble OVA Ichigakki Hoshū), which were released on December 22, 2005. The second season, School Rumble: 2nd Semester (スクールランブル二学期, School Rumble Nigakki), ran from April 2 to September 24, 2006.

Although a third series—School Rumble: Third Semester (スクールランブル三学期, School Rumble Sangakki)—was drawn up in the form of 24 episode synopses, the series was never animated. Instead a two-episode mini-series was released as episodes 25 and 26 of School Rumble: Third Semester. The first 24 episodes follow the manga's storyline between the end of School Rumble: 2nd Semester and the Third Semester mini-series; the promotional videos of the mini-series on the anime's website instead of previews of a new season confirmed that the remaining 24 episodes would not be animated. The School Rumble: Third Semester episodes were released with special editions of volumes 21 and 22 of the School Rumble manga, the first on July 17 and the second on September 17, 2008.

School Rumble, School Rumble: 2nd Semester, and School Rumble: Extra Class were later licensed for an English-language audience by Funimation in North America, Madman Entertainment in Australasia and the first three volumes of season one by Revelation Films in the United Kingdom. On September 1, 2009 Funimation re-released School Rumble: First Semester and Extra class as a compilation. 2nd Semester was re-released as an entire season with a new rating of TV-MA. The anime has also been released in other languages, and Funimation have made several dubbed episodes of School Rumble and School Rumble: 2nd Semester available as streaming content on the Internet. The Funimation Channel began airing the first season of School Rumble on September 1, 2008.School Rumble: 2nd Semester and the Extra Class OVA has also aired on the Funimation Channel. The 2008's Future Film Festival in Bologna, Italy screened School Rumble: 2nd Semester.

The anime's first season focuses on Tenma, Harima, and Karasuma, and Harima's relationships with other females including Sawachika and Yakumo. Its second season involves more of the secondary cast. The Extra Class OVAs are compiled from various first season storylines. Both the Third Semester synopses and episodes return to the main cast. The anime's structure has been compared to Azumanga Daioh, with thematic influences from Full Metal Panic? Fumoffu. In places it makes deliberate use of unconventional nomenclature; the title of episode 25 of season one is a set of pictograms, while episode 26's title has 187 characters in the Japanese original. In season two, the Japanese title for episode 26 consists of just a period.

The narrative of the School Rumble anime is designed to mirror that of the manga, which results in multiple short story segments with no significant connection. Shown from the perspective of its characters—notably Tenma and Harima as they attempt similar ploys to get their crush to notice their affection—the anime uses absurdist humor which often combines elements of popular culture to explore the love-triangle, with jokes that work on multiple levels. One such example, highlighted by Lisa Marie, reviewer for Anime Today, is the bike chase scene in episode 1 of season one. She notes that while anyone can appreciate the chase's inherent humor, those familiar with Initial D will find another level of appreciation that nevertheless does not interfere with viewers who do not catch the deeper reference. Lisa Marie comments "I certainly admit watching an insane bike chase cross paths with Initial D's famous AE86 has a bit more cachet when you know why there's a cheesily rendered race car in slow moving Eurobeat."

=== Music ===
Two anime soundtracks and five maxi single albums based on the anime's opening and closing themes have been released, with all but the second season's closing theme having both a regular and limited edition. In addition, three two-disc drama CDs and three radio dramas have been released on CD. Eight image albums—one for each of the main characters—have also been released, in both a regular and limited edition run.

On December 5, 2004, Yokohama BLITZ held a concert entitled School Rumble PRESENTS Come! come! well-come? party (スクールランブル プレゼンツ Come! come! well-come? party), featuring the voice acting cast of School Rumble. The event was released on DVD on March 24, 2005. Announced around the time of the Japanese release of volume 15, from July 21 through July 25, 2005 a stage play called School Rumble Super Oshibai School Rumble – Osarusan dayo Harima-kun! - (School Rumble スーパーお芝居スクールランブル 〜お猿さんだよ、播磨くん!〜) recapping Season 1 of School Rumble was performed. It was released on DVD on October 10, 2005. Unicorn Table, the soundtrack artists for School Rumble, performed songs from the anime from December 7–9, 2007 at the New York Anime Festival, and again on April 26, 2008 at the Rochester Institute of Technology in Rochester, New York for the Tora-Con anime convention.

=== Other ===
School Rumble
Sleep Helps a Girl Grow

Review score
Publication	Score
Famitsu	6.8 / 8.0

Three video games based on School Rumble have been developed and released in Japan. Marvelous Entertainment published the first game for the PlayStation 2 entitled School Rumble: Sleep Helps a Girl Grow (スクールランブル ねる娘は育つ, School Rumble: Neru Ko wa Sodatsu) on July 21, 2005. It was later reissued on August 10, 2006, as a The Best range budget release. Marvelous Entertainment released a second game, entitled School Rumble: 2nd Semester – Summer Training Camp (of fear?)!! Ghost's Appearing in the Western-styled Building!? Fighting Over the Treasure!!! (スクールランブル二学期 恐怖の(?)夏合宿! 洋館に幽霊現る!? お宝を巡って真っ向勝負!!!の巻, School Rumble Nigakki Kyōfu no (?) Natsugasshuku! Yōkan ni Yūrei Arawaru!? Otakara o Megutte Makkō Shōbu!!! no Maki) on July 20, 2006, also for the PlayStation 2. The story revolves around the School Rumble cast hearing a rumor of treasure hidden within a mansion. Two versions were produced; a regular and a limited edition, the latter of which included a drama CD, memorial album, and a special box with variant cover art. On June 28, 2007, this game was also re-released as a "Best Collection". School Rumble: Sis, This is serious! (スクールランブル 姉さん事件です!, School Rumble: Nēsan Jiken Desu!), published on July 7, 2005 for the PlayStation Portable by Bandai. It has an original story based around Karasuma suffering a sudden collapse. Although the story centers on Tenma, the player can take the perspective of other characters to obtain clues for solving the mystery.

School Rumble has been the basis of two light novels and four guidebooks. The light novels, School Rumble: Koi, Shirisomeshi koro ni (スクールランブル〜恋、知りそめし頃に〜) and School Rumble: Me wa Megarodon no Me (スクールランブル〜メはメガロドンのメ〜, School Rumble: Me is Me for Megalodon), were written by Hiroko Tokita and illustrated by Jin Kobayashi and published in April 2004 and December 2007 respectively. They were later translated by Tong Li Comics into Traditional Chinese. Jin Kobayashi and his editors also wrote and illustrated four official guidebooks for the series: School Rumble: Private File, School Rumble: Official File, School Rumble: Pleasure File, and School Rumble: Treasure File.

School Rumble has spawned much merchandise featuring its characters, including T-shirts and figurines.

== Controversies ==
=== Fansubs ===
In 2004, School Rumble's Japanese license holder, Media Factory, declared its titles off-limits to fan-made subtitled translations—a practice known as fansubbing. The directory website AnimeSuki later removed all links to fansubs of Media Factory's work in response to a cease-and-desist notice issued by the license holder, although fansub group Wannabe Fansubs continued their fansubbing regardless. Media Factory-owned anime has been the subject of debate over the validity of fansubbing practice. Proponents believe School Rumble would have more quickly received an English license had fansubs been allowed to circulate more freely, generating viewer interest.

=== Taiwanese television station fine ===
On January 19, 2012, the Taiwanese children's channel Momo Kids TV was reported to have received a fine of NT$600,000 (about $20,333 in U.S. currency) for broadcasting an episode of School Rumble on December 26, which according to parental complaints contained "high school students watching a pornographic movie together", along with "a scene of jiggling breasts" and "actors moaning in pornographic movies." However, it is worth noting that the show has aired on various international Cartoon Network stations without controversy.

== Sales ==
The School Rumble manga had a successful sales run in Japan and the North American English market. In Japan, several volumes managed to chart: Volume 13 was the ninth best-selling manga for the week of June 21, 2006, before falling to tenth the following week; Volume 15 reached 4th place for the week of December 20, also falling to 10th the following week; and Volume 17 came 7th for the week of June 20, 2007, subsequently dropping to 9th. School Rumble Z ranked 18th for the week of June 15, 2009. Del Rey's North American translation sold well, although not quite as well as in Japan. Volume 3 was ranked 99th in September 2006; volume 4 was 96th in December; volume 5 was 98th in April 2007; volume 12 was 141st in November 2008; and volume 12 was 169th in May 2009. Overall the series ranked as the 145th best-selling English translated manga series for 2008.

Similarly, the anime adaptation of School Rumble also sold very well in Japan according to the Oricon charts. The Japanese DVD release of First Semester saw fluctuating sales for each volume with each charting within the top 45. Volumes 1 and 5 have the best showings at five times at 15 and twice at 17 respectively, while the final three volumes (7 through 9) were the least successful with volume 8 being the lowest ranking twice at 45. While the 2nd Semester continued to sell well, overall sales did not chart as well as the previous season. Most of the DVDs ranked in the range from 50s to 70s and all of them ranked just twice. Volume 1 ranked the best at 41, followed by volume 4 at 49; volume 6 ranked lowest at 100. The Extra Class OVA also ranked once at 66.

The DVD of the voice actor's live performance, come! come! well-come Party, ranked once at 177 on Oricon charts.

== Reception ==
=== Manga ===
Although generally well-received, the manga has also attracted some criticism. Eduardo M. Chavez, of Mania.com, recalls being initially put off by the title, which for him conjured images of battles more physical than emotional. After glancing through the first volume, he was surprised to find his assumption wrong, and concluded that it was appropriately named. While he gives a largely positive review, Chavez finds the series' artwork "simple" and unimpressive. He notes that the first volume becomes slightly repetitive, so praises the way that Kobayashi introduces new themes to the second, bringing variety to the setting. Remarking on Kobayashi's ability to draw on numerous influences, Chavez applauds the manga artist for finding fresh ways of using old themes, preventing School Rumble from becoming derivative. He reserves his highest praise for the "flat" chapters dealing with Yakumo. In the next two volumes Chavez approves of the mixture of comedy and romance and the way the characters "grow up", although acknowledging that while the manga's style suits his personal preferences it will not be to everyone's taste. Jason Thompson in Manga: The Complete Guide criticises jokes as "predictable" and gives the manga 2 stars of 5.

Sakura Eries, also of Mania.com, gave volumes five, six, and eight to eleven positive ratings overall. She noted that volume five may appeal to readers more interested in the side characters, and that appreciating Kobayashi's humor in the second half of chapter eight "requires a bit more mental effort". In volume ten, she remarks that while Kobayashi borrows the oft-used cliché of a disastrous school play, he manages to add enough twists to make it unique. The play's climax, however, confused her more than it amused her.

Carlo Santos, of Anime News Network, gave the English releases of volumes two, three, four, and seven mixed—but largely favorable—B-range reviews. Volume nine he awards a C rating. He approved of the character of Harima, particularly enjoying jokes comparing him to St. Francis of Assisi. Santos found the bonus chapters in volumes three and four, that deal with Yakumo, touching. On the other hand, he criticizes various aspects of the artwork and, by volume seven, laments the staleness of recycled jokes. Despite volume nine's strong start, by its end he relates that, although there were some funny moments, he had become weary of its repetitive plot. A fellow reviewer from Anime News Network, Carl Kimlinger, decided after reviewing four volumes that while the early volumes do not assist plot development, neither do they detract from the manga's appeal; he too had a positive impression overall. Kimlinger found the later volumes better and more entertaining, although not always during the romantic moments.

Chavez praised Del Rey's translation for retaining the manga's original identity; the header, bumper artwork, character biographies, and front covers are all but identical to the Japanese. Eries also thanked Del Rey's translation notes for clearing up some misconceptions for her, although she later concluded that their quality has deteriorated as the series progresses.

Aka Akasaka, the original creator of Kaguya-sama: Love Is War, has revealed that he was inspired by School Rumble to create Kaguya-sama.

=== Anime ===
Like the manga, the anime has been well received but does not avoid criticism; in particular the quality of the animation for both seasons, including the OVAs, has attracted mixed reviews. Some of the humor and romantic elements have been derided while the English dubbing and soundtrack have been universally praised. Most reviewers took the position that, even if they dislike certain elements, the series as a whole contains something that makes them want to see more; a view summed up by Chris Beveridge of Mania.com, who writes:

The stories are really quite simple as well as being things we've seen done dozens of times before. Yet it manages to infuse it with a great deal of fun and humor even if it is familiar. There's a certain energy here that works in the shows [sic] favor as well as bringing in some different elements in terms of the characters. It also doesn't hurt that several of the characters really are quite dim which is a nice contrast from the usual kind of leads.

Beveridge cautioned that because the anime was designed around the non-linear format of the manga, its transitions might at first be troublesome for the viewer, but by the final volume finds the anime in all its aspects far superior.

While School Rumble is generally recognised as a shōnen title targeting the young male market, Katherine Luther, staff reviewer for About.com, refers to it as a shōjo title aimed at girls and young women. Lisa Marie, reviewer for RightStuf's Anime Today podcast, agrees that others, notably males, might see the series as shōjo. Luther calls the first DVD "the perfect back-to-school accessory", while Marie characterizes School Rumble as "insane", asserting it appears on the surface more laid back than other titles like Excel Saga and Haré + Guu. However, it uses its "cast to break...every rule of reality, but it plays everything so straight [that] it takes you a moment to realize what just happened doesn't make any sense." A fan of the subgenre, she praises the anime it for its surreal humour, and for being "anime newbie friendly" in that its jokes work on multiple levels. Not all are of Japanese origin—such as a reference to the long triangular resolution of Star Wars 'Return of the Jedi—giving the series broad appeal.

Anime News Network's reviewers found much to enjoy about the first series, although Theron Martin warns that the first DVD should be "watched in small doses, as trying to tackle too much of it in one sitting will elevate the suicide rate of your brain cells". Carl Kimlinger comments that "from the moment the words 'School Rumble' come spinning onto the screen, you know you're in for ... undiluted good times", and that the title is "two of the greatest animation non-sequiturs you're likely to see anytime soon". Carlo Santos praises volume six's bizarre comedy, but laments its romantic elements as being too generic. Overall, his rating is mediocre, saying that "although this disc technically marks the end of [the first season of] School Rumble, it's really more of a pause, seeing as how the last few episodes simply ride along with the plot rather than try to reach a dramatic finish". Reviewers from Mania.com followed this pattern; Dani Moure was skeptical of the series' long-term entertainment value, but like fellow reviewer Danielle Van Gorder, found his early indifference fading as the story develops. IGN's Jeff Harris, N.S. Davidson, and David F. Smith gave mostly positive reviews, although Davidson believes the audio and extras had begun to wane by volume five. Jakub Lhota of Reanimated rated the first season an 8/10, stating that he enjoyed it more than some other anime series he had previously watched, and the style—if not always the color—of Funimation's metallic locker artbox for School Rumble's English translation of the first season was welcomed.

According to Theron Martin, the OVA series School Rumble: Extra Class was made mostly for devoted fans; claiming that familiarity with the series is almost a necessity before watching it, although he later came to the view that it may also be useful as a sampler of the series. Chris Beveridge gives the OVA series an overall negative review. He did not highlight a single specific reason, instead observing that although all elements that "make the TV series enjoyable are certainly present here, they just feel weaker". However, it did make him want to watch more of the television series, thus serving its intended purpose in keeping interest in the series alive. Katherine Luther endorsed the view that viewers need to be familiar with the story, but reviewed the OVA positively. While she noted lulls in the action, she believes fans will be able to overlook this. Unlike Martin, Luther did not believe the OVA is a good introduction to School Rumble, due to its short sequences and seemingly random nature.

Zac Bertschy of Anime News Network declined to post commentary on the preview announcement for the second season, claiming "we assume if you loved School Rumble, you're gonna check out the sequel regardless of what anyone says, so why bother reviewing it?" David F. Smith from IGN gave the first part of season two a rating of 6/10, with lower scores for the Funimation extras and higher ones for the plot and story. Specifically, Smith praised the anime for never taking itself seriously, and the studio for not cutting its budget for sight gags—something he notes that other companies do. Tim Jones from THEM Anime Reviews found the second season funny and nonrepetitive, and Bamboo Dong of Anime News Network praised the second season for not conforming to the conventions of reality. She complimented it for focusing more on the other students and their relationships than on the main love triangle. Chris Beveridge claimed that, although it comes across well, the season should not be watched in a marathon sitting. He was more critical of Funimation's packaging, preferring the first season's metal locker boxart to the packing for the half-season sets.
