= Kaori Shimizu =

Japanese actress and voice actress (born 1983)

- 清水 香里
- Born: May 21, 1983 (age 43); Tokyo, Japan
- Occupations: Actress; voice actress
- Years active: 1990–present
- Children: 1

Kaori Shimizu (清水 香里, Shimizu Kaori; born May 21, 1983) is a Japanese actress and voice actress who was affiliated with Three Tree Productions and Max Mix. She is not to be confused with "Kaori Shimizu" (清水香織), a similarly named J-pop idol whose voice can be heard in the video game Psycho Soldier.

== Filmography ==
=== Anime ===
List of voice performances in anime
Year	Title	Role	Notes	Source
1998	Serial Experiments Lain	Lain Iwakura		
2000	Boogiepop Phantom	Boogiepop, Touka Miyashita		
2000	A.LI.CE	Alice	feature film	
2000	Banner of the Stars	Ekuryua		
2000	Strange Dawn	Yuko Miyabe		
2000	Inuyasha	Yuka, Asuka		
2001	The Family's Defensive Alliance	Nozomi Daichi		
2001	Alien Nine	Kumi Kawamura		
2001	Fruits Basket	Motoko Minagawa		
2002	Arcade Gamer Fubuki	Hanako Kokubunji		
2003–06	Stratos 4 series	Shizuka Doi		
2003	Dokkoida?!	Asaka, Nerloid Girl		
2003	Godannar	Lou Roux		
2004	The Cosmopolitan Prayers	Takitsu-hime		
2004	Sgt. Frog	Dangaru Yuki		
2004	Doki Doki School Hours	Chinatsu Nakayama		
2004	Maria-sama ga Miteru series	Noriko Nijō	Starting with Printemps	
2004–06	School Rumble series	Akira Takano		
2005	Starship Operators	Sei Ogino		
2005	Marchen Awakens Romance	Flat B		
2005	Best Student Council	Kuon Ginga		
2005	Sugar Sugar Rune	Coco		
2005–15	Magical Girl Lyrical Nanoha	Signum	Starting with A's	
2005	Mushishi	Michihi		
2006	Lemon Angel Project	Yui Kouno		
2006	Spider Riders	Princess Sparkle		
2006	Otogi-Jūshi Akazukin	Hansel, Trude	TV series	
2006	We Were There	Mizu-chin		
2007	Heroic Age	Aneesha		
2007	Idolmaster: Xenoglossia	Chihaya Kisaragi		
2007	Lucky Star	Hiyori Tamura		
2007	Nanatsuiro Drops	Nadeshiko Yaeno		
2007	Sketchbook: Full Color's	Sekka Kamiya		
2007	Ghost Hound	Inspect		
2008	S · A: Special A	Midori Takishima		
2008	Net Ghost PiPoPa	Web Venus		
2008	Nogizaka Haruka no Himitsu	Hazuki Sakurazaka		
2010	Super Robot Wars Original Generation: The Inspector	Lamia Loveless		
2011	Rio: Rainbow Gate!	Rosa Canyon		
2011	Phi Brain: Puzzle of God	Nonoha Itou		
2013	Genshiken Second Season	Keiko Sasahara		
2014	I Can't Understand What My Husband Is Saying	Miki		
2015	Go! Princess PreCure	Sei		

=== Video games ===
List of voice performances in video games
Year	Title	Role	Notes	Source
2008	BioShock	Little Sister		
2008	Aoi Shiro	Kaya, Narumi Natsuyoru		
2008–10	Super Robot Wars: Original Generations	Lamia Loveless		
2008	Tales of Hearts	Richea Spodune		
2009–14	Arcana Heart series	Zenia Valov		
2014	Dengeki Bunko: Fighting Climax	Boogie Pop	support character	

=== Other ===
- Yotekku radio program – Interim host – replacing Natsuko Kuwatani
- Pun-Colle ~voice actresses' legendary punk songs collection (2009) – "Blitzkrieg Bop" by Ramones
