= Kawaii Kon =

Anime convention in Honolulu

Coordinates: 21°17′25.44″N 157°50′8.52″W

- Venue: Hawaii Convention Center
- Locations: Honolulu, Hawaii
- Country: United States
- Inaugurated: 2005
- Attendance: 13,076 in 2019
- Organizer: Dyad LLC
- Website: http://www.kawaiikon.com/

Kawaii Kon is an anime convention geared towards Japanese animation and comics held in the Honolulu area.

== Programming ==
Kawaii Kon currently has AMV and anime screenings; industry, fan, and guest panels; Hall Cosplay contests, Masquerade/Cosplay Competitions, Art Shows, Artist Alley Contests, Concerts, Dances, and Karaoke, along with Video and Role Playing games, autographs, and a Dealer's Room.

== History ==
Kawaii Kon was founded by Gamers Evolution Expo, LLC., a company started by Stan Dahlin, Marlon Stodghill and Scott Richardson. Dahlin is a Hawaii native himself, who was at the time based out of Atlanta, Georgia. As for why they decided to bring an anime convention to Hawaii, taken from the website: "Being a transplanted local boy living far away from home for a better part of a decade or more, I'm very proud to be hosting this show in my home state. You ask why? A number of reasons but to simply state it.... I love anime!"

Kawaii Kon was the first anime convention to be held in Hawaii. Local support for the convention by fans in the event's first year resulted in a surprising attendance level that surpassed the staff's expectations. Kawaii Kon 2020 was moved from May to August due to the COVID-19 pandemic, and was later cancelled. Comic Con Honolulu and Kawaii Kon were going to combine for the August 2020 event, until it was cancelled. Kawaii Kon 2021 was moved from April to November due to the COVID-19 pandemic, and was also later cancelled. Kawaii Kon held an online event on May 29-30, 2021. Comic Con Honolulu and Kawaii Kon combined for the 2022 event. 2024 changes included additional concert and video game space.

=== Event history ===
Dates	Location	Atten.	Guests
April 22 – 24, 2005	Ala Moana Hotel; Honolulu, Hawaii	1,903	S. Kai Bovaird, Robert DeJesus, Kaveh Kardan, Monica Rial, Stephanie Sheh, and David L. Williams.
April 14 – 16, 2006	Ala Moana Hotel; Honolulu, Hawaii	2,610	S. Kai Bovaird, Emily DeJesus, Robert DeJesus, Yoko Ishida, Jin Kobayashi, Vic Mignogna, Monica Rial, Stan Sakai, Sean Schemmel, Stephanie Sheh, Michael Sinterniklaas, and David L. Williams.
April 27 – 29, 2007	Hawaii Convention Center; Honolulu, Hawaii	2,925	Christine Auten, Greg Ayres, Steve Blum, Luci Christian, Emily DeJesus, Robert DeJesus, Brittney Karbowski, Vic Mignogna, Monica Rial, Christopher Sabat, Stephanie Sheh, Michael Sinterniklaas, David L. Williams, and Travis Willingham.
April 18 – 20, 2008	Hawaii Convention Center; Honolulu, Hawaii	3,739	Colleen Clinkenbeard, Emily DeJesus, Robert DeJesus, The Emeralds, Tiffany Grant, Mari Iijima, Vic Mignogna, Yuko Miyamura, Monica Rial, Rikki Simons, David L. Williams, and Tavisha Wolfgarth-Simons.
April 10 – 12, 2009	Hawaii Convention Center; Honolulu, Hawaii	4,479	Shinji Aramaki, Laura Bailey, Travis Willingham, Caitlin Glass, Illich Guardiola, Brina Palencia, Stan Sakai, David L. Williams, Vic Mignogna, Tsu Shi Ma Mi Re, and The Emeralds.
April 16 – 18, 2010	Hawaii Convention Center; Honolulu, Hawaii	4,877	Alt/Air, Shinji Aramaki, Johnny Yong Bosch, Emily DeJesus, Robert DeJesus, Samantha Inoue-Harte, Hideo Ishikawa, Daisuke Kishio, Vic Mignogna, Masakazu Morita, Wendy Powell, and David L. Williams.
April 29 – May 1, 2011	Hawaii Convention Center; Honolulu, Hawaii	5,203	Alt/Air, Eleven Staples, Jacob Grady, Wendee Lee, Scott McNeil, Doug Smith, Jonathan Tarbox, David L. Williams, and Kappei Yamaguchi.
March 16 – 18, 2012	Hawaii Convention Center; Honolulu, Hawaii	7,542	Akino, Yoshitaka Amano, Yuu Asakawa, bless4, Johnny Yong Bosch, Eyeshine, Ryo Horikawa, Vic Mignogna, Kenichi Miya, Lisa Ortiz, Christopher Sabat, and David L. Williams.
March 15 – 17, 2013	Hawaii Convention Center; Honolulu, Hawaii	7,975	Johnny Yong Bosch, Colleen Clinkenbeard, Eyeshine, Toshihiro Fukuoka, Toshio Furukawa, Todd Haberkorn, Noizi Ito, Mint, Iruma Rioka, and Lisle Wilkerson.
April 4 – 6, 2014	Hawaii Convention Center; Honolulu, Hawaii	8,500	Misako Aoki, Chalk Twins, Jim Cummings, Quinton Flynn, Ayumi Fujimura, Richard Horvitz, Yoko Ishida, Hironobu Kageyama, Tetsuya Kakihara, Vic Mignogna, Masako Nozawa, Nicki Rapp, Leah Rose, Stephanie Sheh, Michael Sinterniklaas, Janet Varney, and Lisle Wilkerson.
March 27 – 29, 2015	Hawaii Convention Center; Honolulu, Hawaii	10,450	Akira, Eir Aoi, Toru Furuya, Todd Haberkorn, Jess Harnell, Cassandra Lee Morris, Range Murata, Bryce Papenbrook, Rob Paulsen, and Leah Rose.
April 8 – 10, 2016	Hawaii Convention Center; Honolulu, Hawaii	11,597	Curtis Arnott, Steve Blum, Johnny Yong Bosch, Grey DeLisle Griffin, Eyeshine, Sandy Fox, GARNiDELiA, Yumiri Hanamori, Naoto Hirooka, Joe Inoue, Shigeto Koyama, Lex Lang, Cherami Leigh, Loverin Tamburin, Toshio Maeda, Mary Elizabeth McGlynn, Jessica Nigri, Asami Shimoda, J. Michael Tatum, Hiromi Wakabayashi, and Lisle Wilkerson.
April 7 – 9, 2017	Hawaii Convention Center; Honolulu, Hawaii	12,104	Mai Aizawa, Dante Basco, bless4, Zach Callison, Luna Haruna, Joe Inoue, Kanae Ito, Erica Mendez, Vic Mignogna, Courtenay Taylor, Janet Varney, David Vincent, and Lisle Wilkerson.
March 2 – 4, 2018	Hawaii Convention Center; Honolulu, Hawaii	12,527	Bea Billany, Christine Marie Cabanos, Jonny Cruz, Elisa, Jacob Grady, Todd Haberkorn, Ryo Horikawa, K-ble Jungle, Brittney Karbowski, Carrie Keranen, Linda Le, Shiori Mikami, Marin M. Miller, ROOKiEZ is PUNK'D, Leah Rose, Hitoshi Sakimoto, Micah Solusod, Courtenay Taylor, Cristina Vee, Kari Wahlgren, Hynden Walch, Lisle Wilkerson, and Yuyoyuppe.
April 5 – 7, 2019	Hawaii Convention Center; Honolulu, Hawaii	13,076	Mashiro Ayano, Steve Blum, Nobutoshi Canna, Elisa, Jacob Grady, Aya Hirano, Brittney Karbowski, Mika Kobayashi, Katsuyuki Konishi, Magic of Life, Mana, Jason Marsden, Mary Elizabeth McGlynn, Brandon McInnis, Leah Rose, Stephanie Sheh, Genevieve Simmons, Juliet Simmons, Michael Sinterniklaas, Matilda Smedius, J. Michael Tatum, and Hynden Walch.
April 22 – 24, 2022	Hawaii Convention Center; Honolulu, Hawaii		Asca, Steve Blum, Ray Chase, Robbie Daymond, Grey DeLisle Griffin, Jack DeSena, Doug Erholtz, Maile Flanagan, Deedee Magno Hall, Mika Kobayashi, Mary Elizabeth McGlynn, Michaela Jill Murphy, Nano, Tony Oliver, Michelle Ruff, TeddyLoid and Cristina Vee.
March 31 – April 2, 2023	Hawaii Convention Center; Honolulu, Hawaii	20,489 (est.)	6%Dokidoki, Bennett Abara, Ryan Bartley, Poonam Basu, Laila Berzins, Steve Blum, Burnout Syndromes, Sean Chiplock, Sandy Fox, Diana Garnet, Caitlin Glass, Olivia Hack, Erika Harlacher, Shigeto Koyama, Jennie Kwan, Lex Lang, Cricket Leigh, Landon McDonald, Mary Elizabeth McGlynn, Pixy, Erica Schroeder, James Sie, Konomi Suzuki, Eric Vale, and Hiromi Wakabayashi.
March 29-31, 2024	Hawaii Convention Center; Honolulu, Hawaii		ACME, Asaka, Johnny Yong Bosch, Christine Marie Cabanos, Charlet Chung, James Ernest, Lizzie Freeman, Todd Haberkorn, Erika Harlacher, Kyle Hebert, Kikuko Inoue, Brittney Karbowski, Ryan Colt Levy, E. Jason Liebrecht, Madkid, Ai Maeda, Faye Mata, Adam McArthur, Sarah Miller-Crews, Cassandra Lee Morris, Mai Nakahara, Atelier Pierrot, Christopher Sabat, Keith Silverstein, Stereo Dive Foundation, Takeshi Takadera, Nami Tamaki, and Sarah Wiedenheft.
March 14-16, 2025	Hawaii Convention Center; Honolulu, Hawaii		Ash Da Hero, Aliona Baranova, Justin Briner, Clifford Chapin, Luci Christian, Colleen Clinkenbeard, Akitaroh Daichi, Jennifer English, Hirokatsu Kihara, David Matranga, Kristen McGuire, Emily Neves, Neil Newbon, Ai Nonaka, Alex Organ, Mallorie Rodak, Megan Shipman, Theo Solomon, Sonny Strait, Natalie Van Sistine, and Devora Wilde.
April 24-25, 2026	Hawaii Convention Center; Honolulu, Hawaii		A.J. Beckles, Flow, Rich Keeble, Alan Lee, Mela Lee, Emi Lo, Nano, Anairis Quiñones, Keith Silverstein, Austin Tindle, Abby Trott, Sumire Uesaka, Howard Wang, Devora Wilde, Suzie Yeung, and Zaq.

== See also ==
- Izumicon

== Pictures ==
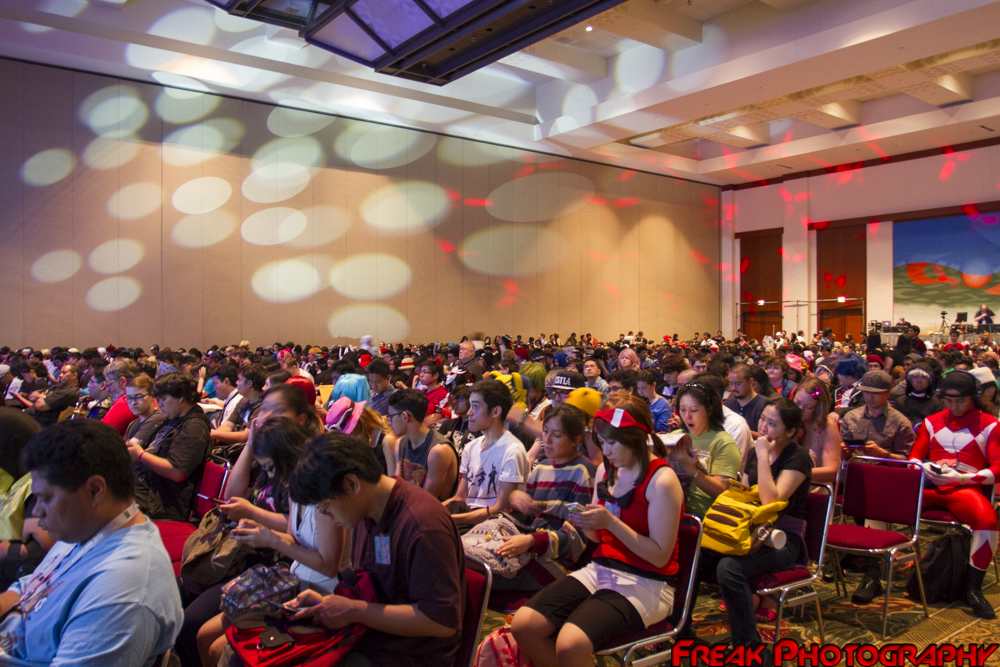
Kawaii Kon 2015 opening ceremony crowd

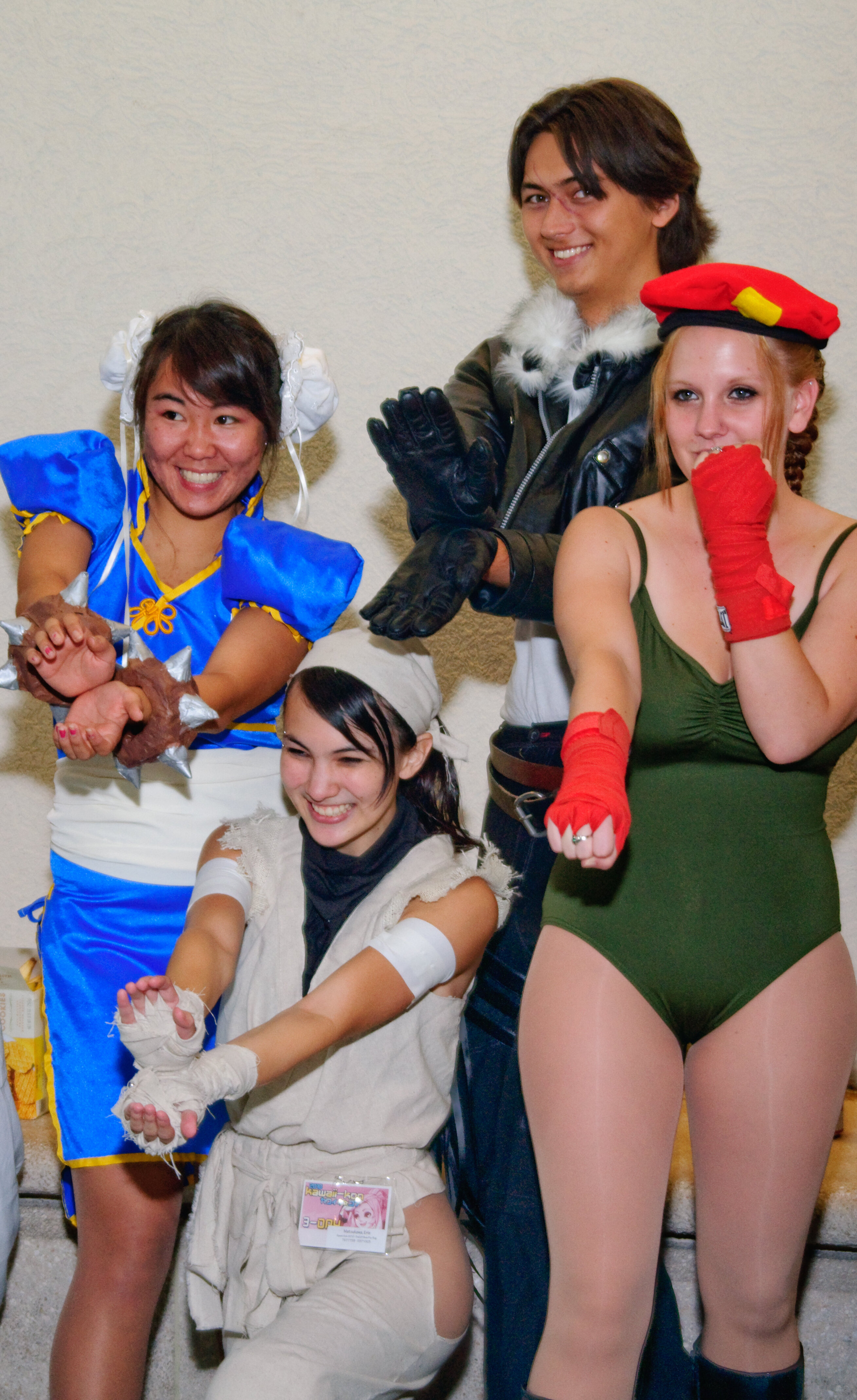
Group cosplay of characters from Street Fighter games at the 2010 Kawaii Kon
