= List of School Rumble characters =

The main School Rumble cast and supporting characters

The School Rumble manga and anime series features a cast of characters designed by Jin Kobayashi. The story takes place mostly in a Japanese high school and revolves around various love triangles and polygons. The manga series is followed by a short parallel world story, School Rumble Z.

The manga alternates between several main protagonists. In the main storyline chapters, the protagonists are Tenma Tsukamoto and Kenji Harima. The side chapters focus on many of the side characters from the main chapters, with most of them focusing on Yakumo Tsukamoto. While many of the chapters are gag stories, the central theme of School Rumble is relationships, mostly because of love, and as the series progresses, characters are introduced, and situations are misinterpreted. Hence the relationship web becomes more complex. Since the characters are unable to let their true feelings be known to the ones they like, tension and rivalries build.

The article puts character names of Japanese characters in the Western order (given name, then surname). Del Rey Manga, which published the manga in English, retained the Japanese naming order (that is, surname and then given name) to preserve puns and humor involving the names of the characters.

== Creation and design ==
Jin Kobayashi started writing the series School Rumble because he found the idea of a manga involving a delinquent falling in love interesting. Kobayashi's favorite character, Kenji Harima, is based largely on an amalgam of various friends, although he estimates "about 30%" of Harima is a reflection of himself. However, despite putting most of his personal feelings into the female characters, he stated that Ryuuhei Suga, a minor supporting character, is the most autobiographical. Most of the other characters are based on memories of former high-school classmates; As a manga author, Kobayashi also designed the cover art. Originally, the fifth volume's front cover was to feature Akira Takano, but after re-reading the volume Kobayashi concluded that since much of its plot in that volume revolves around Karen Ichijo, she should be on the cover instead. Desiring to feature a male character, he placed Harima on the cover of volume six.

An anime adaptation of the series was never envisaged by Kobayashi, and he was skeptical of the project when first approached. Negotiations and preparation took some time, but he claims to be happy with the result. On viewing the first anime footage, Kobayashi was astonished; he recalls in an interview his emotions at the time, stating "I was incredibly touched by it. Completely overcome." Impressed with the adaptation of his work, Kobayashi allowed the voice actors who voiced his characters significant freedom to interpret them as they chose. There were a number of cast changes throughout the production; Ami Koshimizu, the voice actress for Tenma, had initially auditioned for the role of Yakumo, and between School Rumble's first and second seasons the voice actors for both Karen Ichijou and Yoko Sasakura were replaced. Mako Sakurai took over Karen's role from Yuuka Nanri, and Aya Hirano replaced Akiko Kurumado as Yoko.

== Main characters ==
=== Tenma Tsukamoto ===
Tenma Tsukamoto (塚本 天満, Tsukamoto Tenma)

Voiced by: Ami Koshimizu (Japanese); Luci Christian (English)
Profile:
- Birthday: November 30
- Blood type: A

The female protagonist. Short and fairly childish for her age, Tenma is often mistaken as being younger than her classmates and her younger sister Yakumo.

She does not perceive herself as particularly attractive to boys, although many of them acknowledge her cuteness. She aspires to be seen as a mature woman and endeavors to impress Karasuma through her cooking skills. One of her distinctive physical features are the little pigtails in her hair, which often wiggle if she is happy, excited and sometimes shocked. They also sag down if she is disappointed or sad. She is also slow and unreliable; she often misunderstands obvious situations. Despite her negative qualities, Tenma is good-natured, friendly, sweet, and very determined. She enjoys professional wrestling and, along with Harima, is a fan of the jidaigeki television show The Three For The Kill (三匹が斬られる!, Sanbiki ga Kirareru!). Tenma also has relatively low academic scores. Both she and her sister have part-time jobs to make ends meet.

After knowing of Karasuma's disease, and even finding out that he lost all memories of her, she decided to transfer to the United States and continue her studies there in order to stay beside him. When she learns there is nothing that can be done, her life is given meaning and she decides to study medicine.

She makes her last appearance at the end of School Rumble Z comforting her sister.

According to the last Japanese poll performed by the publishers of the manga, Tenma is currently the fourth most popular character in the series.

In the anime adaptation of Natsu no Arashi! (which was also made by Jin Kobayashi), she and Harima made a cameo appearance at the cafe as customers wearing their school uniforms.

=== Kenji Harima ===
Kenji Harima (播磨 拳児, Harima Kenji)

Voiced by: Hiroki Takahashi (Japanese); Brandon Potter (English)

The male protagonist. Harima is a stubborn and paranoid ex-delinquent who is in love with Tenma who still retains some aspects of his former persona, especially riding on his motorcycle and getting into fights with other delinquents during the beginning of the series. Harima's name is occasionally mistaken for the name of another person in class 2-D, Harry Mackenzie, because of the similarities in pronunciation. (Note: In Japan, the family name is listed first followed by a given name. Japanese traditionally do not have middle names. In the United States, given name is listed first followed by family name. See "Japanese name") Harima, like his crush, Tenma, is a fan of the jidaigeki television show The Three For The Kill. Harima lives with his older cousin Itoko, who is also Yakumo's homeroom teacher.

Harima began drawing manga as a means of escape after realizing Tenma was in love with Karasuma. In his manga, Harima inserts himself and Tenma into various storylines where the Harima-like character often defeats the Karasuma-like character and always wins the heart of the Tenma-like character. Later, he became serious about it after deciding to enter an amateur manga contest which he gets an honorable mention. Yakumo becomes his editor as she becomes the only person he trusts reading his manga. This results in misinterpretations by others, especially Tenma, who think they are dating because of Harima's desire to keep his work secret.

Harima's appearance changes throughout the series. He begins wearing sunglasses with a mustache, goatee and with his hair is pulled back with a headband, leaving an ahoge. He originally adopted this look to avoid being recognized by Tenma. The year before, he saved Tenma from a thug. However, as Tenma passed out Harima brought her back to rest at his place and when she woke up, Tenma, while grateful for the help against the thug, accused him of being a pervert. While Tenma has forgotten the incident, and his appearance fools her initially, as the series goes on she comes closer to remembering the incident. To avoid this, Harima tries to distract her when she appears to be on the verge of remembering. As the series progresses, he undergoes several changes in appearance. He has a long beard for a time (which he grew in an attempt to impress Tenma), a shaved head shortly following him shaving his beard off, and because Eri was mad at him for that she shaved the top of his head, and for a time has a shaved face because Eri accidentally cut it, and upon hearing that Tenma didn't like beards he shaved it off completely. Eventually he returns to the look the series started with. He also has his own finisher attack, named 'Hurricane Kick' (a portmanteau of his name, HARIma KENji) which parodies Kamen Rider's Rider Kick.

In the anime adaptation of Natsu no Arashi!, he and Tenma made a brief cameo appearance with no spoken lines.

=== Oji Karasuma ===
Oji Karasuma (烏丸 大路, Karasuma Ōji)

Voiced by: Ryosei Konishi (Japanese); Eric Vale (English)

Karasuma is Tenma's love interest, depicted as an eccentric enigmatic, but distant character. Although it seems Tenma's feelings for him are unrequited, he shows true concern for her in the story on a more subtle level. His parents live in the United States; in the beginning of the story, Karasuma was supposed to move there, which caused Tenma, in a fit of despair, to write him a love scroll (it was initially meant to be a love letter, but Tenma had written what she felt, so in the end, it came out in the form of a scroll) which he reads all the way through, but ultimately decides to ignore because Tenma had forgotten to sign it.

As the school year continues, the two get increasingly closer thanks to Tenma's own incredible determination to be with him and occasional help by Harima. Eventually, Tenma reveals her feelings to Karasuma, but before she can get a reply he contracts a rare disease which causes memory loss to both his long-term and short-term memory. In chapter 273, Far and Away, before he completely lost his memory, he saw an illusion of Tenma and confess his love to her, that he had always loved her and promised himself that looking at her is just fine because he doesn't want her to be sad, but he couldn't keep the promise of him not falling in love with her. Tenma wasn't able to hear Karasuma's confession and decided to stay in the U.S. to become a doctor to cure Karasuma and hope he can remember about her and 2-C class. At the last chapter of School Rumble, he starts to remember more about Tenma and 2-C.

Karasuma is secretly a famous manga artist, publishing his works under the pen name of Jo Nijo (二条 丈, Nijō Jō). Harima, who really admired his manga, discovers this while pursuing his own manga artist ambitions. When he learns that Tenma was in love with Karasuma his respect turns into hatred, until Harima reconciles with himself internally that what he wants is for Tenma to be happy.

In School Rumble Z, years have passed and he only regained some memories, but he is happy with Tenma by his side.

=== Eri Sawachika ===
Eri Sawachika (沢近 愛理, Sawachika Eri)

Voiced by: Yui Horie (Japanese); Leah Clark (English)
Profile:
- Birthday: February 28
- Blood Type: O

From her introduction onwards, Eri is characterized as having a dual nature. Talented, beautiful, wealthy, and popular, she is admired and envied by her classmates for the glamorous lifestyle that many believe her to lead. In reality, however, Eri uses this image and her outward confidence to mask her inward feelings of loneliness and insecurity. Her social status makes her unapproachable to many of her classmates and leaves her somewhat isolated from her peers. Even at home, her parents are away on business more frequently than not. The process by which Eri grows and matures, as she starts to develop deeper friendships and searches for love, forms the backbone of one of the main plotlines in the story. She also develops feelings for Kenji. She usually denies it, but as the story goes on her feelings for Kenji get stronger.

Eri is the illegitimate child of a prominent British businessman. Her mother is from Kyoto. Although Eri was born in Japan, she moved to England for her early schooling before returning to Japan to attend high school. As a result, her knowledge of kanji is limited, causing her to occasionally make humorous linguistic mistakes.

Eri's most striking features are her amber eyes and long blond hair (which she usually ties into pigtails), which signify her mixed British-Japanese heritage. While she is often admired for her looks, her origin is occasionally the subject of derisive remarks, such as during the class trip to Kyoto.

Kenji's nickname for Eri is Ojo (お嬢, Ojō), as a somewhat mocking reference to her status. (Note: This is not to be confused with Ojo-sama (お嬢様, Ojōsama; lit. "lady"/"miss")", which is a formal title used by Mr. Nakamura and the rest of the Sawachika family's household staff to address Eri. "Ojō" is the short form of "Ojō-sama". Because Kenji is not trying to be polite, he does not use "sama".) In the English dub, Kenji would call her by the name "Rich Girl." Conversely, she addresses to Kenji as Hige (ヒゲ; loosely translated as "bearded guy"), even after he does away with his facial hair. In the English Dub, Eri calls him "Whiskers".

=== Yakumo Tsukamoto ===
Yakumo Tsukamoto (塚本 八雲, Tsukamoto Yakumo)

Voiced by: Mamiko Noto (Japanese); Caitlin Glass (English)

Yakumo is the most admired girl in school and Tenma's younger sister. Yakumo displays the ability to read the minds of those who find her attractive (Note: This is visually represented by floating text next to their owners. This is often used to comedic effect, such as when she is detects Haruki Hanai from a distance without seeing him and tries to avoid him, but is soon "trampled" by the wildly rampaging thoughts of multiple infatuated boys.) (though she once read Harima's mind before they got properly acquainted, and "heard" nothing but silence). She is also smart, beautiful and shy. Yakumo tries to cook all the meals for the house, being afraid of the mess and taste of Tenma's cooking. Despite her many positive qualities, Yakumo has never had a boyfriend, having turned down at least eight would-be suitors. Yakumo is scouted by several high school clubs because of her many talents; however, she declines joining most of them because she dreads spending time with Hanai, who follows her with the intent of joining the same clubs. Thanks to a ban on Hanai decreed by Akira, Yakumo becomes a member of the Tea Club along with her best friend, Sarah. As the story progresses and she becomes a manga editor, Yakumo falls in love with Harima. Later, they are rumored to be a couple, to the annoyance of Eri, who tries to interfere due to her own romantic feelings for Harima.

During Yakumo's childhood, her name is often mispronounced by Tenma as "Ya'mo", and Tenma's attempts to become a reliable older sister usually backfire due to her clumsiness much to her annoyance, leading to a short break up between them, until she starts recognizing Tenma's kindness towards her as far more important than any of her older sister's faults.

Yakumo finds a stray black cat with an X-shaped scar on its forehead who follows her to school. After several failed attempts, the cat no longer runs away from her. She gives him the name Iori (伊織) and brings him home to live with her, though he is continually wary of Tenma. Later, when Iori avoids Yakumo, Harima saves Iori from drowning, then pulls a thorn out of his leg, and the cat begins liking him.

In the characters popularity polls held by the publishers of the manga, Yakumo's standings rose during the series run, reaching the top position in the third and final poll.

=== Mikoto Suou ===
Mikoto Suou (周防 美琴, Suō Mikoto)

Voiced by: Hitomi Nabatame (Japanese); Brina Palencia (English)

Mikoto is a close friend of Tenma. She is a tomboyish large-breasted very pretty young woman who has a black belt in kenpo. She is often seen sparring with her childhood friend, Hanai. Mikoto is very athletic; she learns how to swim when forced to and becomes a competent basketball player in a short amount of time.

Although Mikoto always tries to help out others when they are having relationship problems, she herself has trouble facing her own relationship issues. When she was younger, Mikoto had a crush on her tutor, Masahiro Kozu (神津 正弘, Kōzu Masahiro). When he returns after graduating, she breaks an agreement with Eri to meet him only to learn he has a girlfriend and because of that she hides her feelings for him. Later, she dates Asou, but the romance does not last long. She is very popular with the boys for her determination and amazing talent in sport, but mainly for her large breasts. Imadori especially constantly tries to touch her.

A School Rumble Z chapter features a storyline where she is married to Haruki Hanai. (Note: In the tankōbon format, it was confirmed that School Rumble Z chapter 5 was a parallel world story.)

=== Akira Takano ===
Akira Takano (高野 晶, Takano Akira)

Voiced by: Kaori Shimizu (Japanese); Trina Nishimura (English)

The president of the Tea Club and a close friends with Tenma, Mikoto and Eri. Akira is very perceptive, resourceful, intelligent, and very mysterious. She has an uncanny ability to see through the true intentions of people (like Harima's feelings for Tenma), and her enigmatic face always hides schemes she creates to help her friends or play pranks on her classmates. The only prank of Akira's that fails involves her dressing up in a penguin suit and trying to catch her Tea Club members in an embarrassing position as they are trapped half-way between two floors. The prank backfired upon herself as she also gets caught, unable to escape. She is almost never seen smiling. During Tenma's birthday party, Tenma demands Akira show her a smile. Akira agrees and her and Tenma go off screen behind a door where Tenma remarks about it. She can also be seen smiling briefly when attempting to console a distressed Tenma during Episode 20 of Season 2. Her favorite victim is Haruki, who she early on appeared to dislike, but later shows to have some romantic feelings for him. She takes part-time jobs doing various dangerous secretive jobs which she does not tell her friends about. She tries not to spend the earnings.

She is the daughter of a journalist and has a younger half-sister, Motoko Hiiragi (柊 素子, Hiiragi Motoko), who tends to be sick frequently.

In School Rumble Z, she has taken the profession of an international agent. She is hired by Eri to help Mikoto and Hanai with their current problem. Akira targeted Ganji Nishimoto, who was the source of Haruki's problems. Using a high-tech camera she secretly takes pictures of Ganji trying to bribe others into voting for him. The pictures are then leaked to the public, causing Ganji to resign from his campaign to become mayor.

=== Haruki Hanai ===
Haruki Hanai (花井 春樹, Hanai Haruki)

Voiced by: Shinji Kawada (Japanese); Chris Cason (English)

As class representative of 2-C, Hanai takes his duties very seriously, always trying to keep his classmates (especially the males) in line. Unable to have second thoughts, he always says exactly what comes into his mind regardless of the consequences. Although he is against perversion, he occasionally cannot help himself from temptations such as viewing sexy photos of Itoko Osakabe under the excuse of validating their authenticity or "confiscating" Ganji Nishimoto's entire porn tape collection. As a child, he was shy, weak, and always been bullied by other children. That changed with a little help from his childhood friend Mikoto.

He is married to Mikoto in one of the scenarios in School Rumble Z, but at times neglects her because he is too busy. He is campaigning to be Mayor of Yagami. He was framed by Nishimoto, who is also bidding to be mayor of Yagami, and that just about puts his dream of being mayor away. However, he was able to resume campaigning after Akira dealt with Nishimoto.

== Secondary characters ==
=== Kyousuke Imadori ===
Kyousuke Imadori (今鳥 恭介, Imadori Kyōsuke)

Voiced by: Daisuke Kishio (Japanese); David Trosko (English)

Imadori is the class's number two pervert (the pervert ringleader being Ganji Nishimoto) earning him the nickname "Hummingbird". He has the special skill of knowing a girl's bra size just by looking at her chest. Interested only in girls with breast sizes of D or larger, the main targets of his flirting are Mikoto and Lala; he continues to pursue them relentlessly, although they continually beat him up. He has some physical abilities, such as being strong enough to grapple Hanai to a standstill. He works in his family's hair salon, Now Bird. Along with Tenma, he is the only high school character shown to enjoy the tokusatsu super sentai parody, Hatenko Robo Dozibiron. He has a sensitive side to him, which he shows towards Lala when he tries to get her to smile at her part-time job, even at the cost of getting walloped by her.

While Imadori likes girls with large breasts, he's friendly to Ichijo to the point of even dating her. (Note: It is never revealed what size her breasts are.) As the series progresses, their relationship develops and it becomes apparent he cares about her. He even quits his perverted acts just to please Karen.

=== Karen Ichijo ===
Karen Ichijo (一条 かれん, Ichijō Karen)

Voiced by: Yūka Nanri (1st series), Mako (voice actress) (2nd series) (Japanese); Carrie Savage (English)

Ichijo has monstrous strength despite having a weak and feminine appearance and is a member of the amateur wrestling club. Her power amazes even her strongest male classmates. (Note: Karen carries an upright piano without any signs of physical stress, while Harima and Hanai were on the verge of breakdown trying to carry objects of the same weight - a chest of drawers and a refrigerator, respectively) It would also seem that she is not able to control her strength well, as shown when she nearly suffocates Tenma when trying to cover her mouth so that she does not blurt out secrets. Lara Gonzalez is her only rival in this regard, but has not been able to physically defeat her (In fact, Ichijo defeated her with her ultimate move, the "Frankensteiner"). Despite this, Ichijō has not reciprocated Lara's antagonism, always remaining polite towards her. Later the two seem to have developed into friends.

Despite her strength she has a kind nature and is one of the more timid girls in 2-C. She is in love with Imadori, but is embarrassed when this is hinted at. Imadori also initially avoids her, not only because of her small measures (later it is revealed that she does have considerably large breasts), but also because he fears her strength. She is also a good singer, and her singing is featured in episodes 2 and 6 of School Rumble - Second Term.

When Imadori met her practicing wrestling and asked her why she liked it, she said that she really did not want to do wrestling. Later, when Imadori, along with Harima and Hanai were working for a moving company, they found out that Ichijō was also working with them as well as how strong she was. At the end of their shift, Imadori accidentally said that he could take Karen out on a date with his earnings, which Karen agrees to, even though Imadori did not really mean it. As the series progresses, Karen falls deeper in love with Imadori but continuously lacks the courage to act out. She is rewarded when she finally defeats him in a wrestling match however, with an indirect confession from him. The confession might even mean a proposal because of the ring he gives her.

Karen has a younger brother, Kosuke (康介, Kōsuke) who, like Imadori, is also a Dojibiron fan.

Karen is currently the 6th most popular character in the final popularity poll, making her the most popular character outside the main characters.

=== Harry Mackenzie ===
Harry Mackenzie (ハリー マッケンジー, Harī Makkenjī)

Voiced by: Nobuyuki Hiyama (Japanese); Jason Liebrecht (English)

Harry Mackenzie is a blonde-haired exchange student from England (United States in anime adaptation), skilled at fighting and a rival of Kenji Harima and Hanai. His name is pronounced the same as Harima's (in traditional Japanese use of family name first, Harima Kenji, with the exception that the j is replaced by a z) in Japanese, which leads to more than a few misunderstandings between the two. He is once mistaken as Harima by Hanai. Harry appears to have a deep reverence for samurai, based on episodes 21 and 22. He is extremely athletic, as seen during the sports festival. He rides a sports motorcycle that is a parody of Gundam, and can be seen usually hanging out with Masakazu Togo. He and Lala Gonzalez make a good team, as seen during the sports festival. Suave and a little flirtatious, Harry is shown putting the moves on various 2-C girls at different times, including both Karen Ichijo and Tsumugi Yuki.

=== Lala Gonzalez ===
Lala Gonzalez (ララ ゴンザレス, Rara Gonzaresu)

Voiced by: Yū Kobayashi (Japanese); Monica Rial (English)

Lala is an exchange student from Mexico, and a skilled practitioner of Lucha libre, which she learned from her father. She belongs to the same amateur wrestling club as Ichijo, who she sees her as a rival, often shouting "Ichijō!" when she meets her. Lara dislikes Ichijo's name because her mother, who abandoned her and her father when she was a child, was also named Karen.

She detests the pervert Imadori, especially when he managed to grope her chest while being choked. She thus tends to beat him up whenever she sees him after sufficient provocation. Lara also despises Imadori when he wins at a certain activity. Lara works in the same fast food restaurant as Ichijo, where no one dared to go to her counter because of her violent temper. She even grabs customers that annoy her and drags them inside for a beating. Lara's closest friends appear to be Harry and Togo, who both look out for her. Later, her animosity towards Ichijo softens. Her character is the direct opposite of her rival Ichijo, being that she is tall, well-endowed, sour-faced, hot-tempered, and very easily provoked.

=== Masakazu Tougou ===
Masakazu Togo (東郷 雅一, Tōgō Masakazu)

Voiced by: Hiroki Yasumoto (Japanese); Travis Willingham (English)

Masakazu is 2-D's class representative who sees class 2-C as rivals. Despite his obvious self-confidence, his character leads to rejections from his classmates. Later in the series, He shows some interest in Tenma, to Harima's distress. He is often seen with Harry. Some people around him usually refer to him with the nickname "Macaroni". He has a tendency to burst into extremely long inspirational speeches either involving facing challenges or being manly. As the series progressed, his self-confidence and passion for facing challenges head on have become so extreme that his actions and ideas often border on stupidity and often contain a lack of regard for the safety and well-being of others. His appearance is often followed by the American national anthem and has a tendency to refer to himself as an American, saying he lived in the states Texas, New York, Alaska and California. He is a skilled sportsman and martial artist, similar to his main rival Hanai, that he takes such things very seriously.

He has a younger sister, Haruna (榛名).

=== Sarah Adiemus ===
Sarah Adiemus (サラ アディエマス, Sara Adiemasu)

Voiced by: Yukari Fukui (Japanese); Gwendolyn Lau (English)

The best friend of Yakumo, Sarah is distinguished by her blonde hair done up in a bun. She is a British girl raised in an orphanage in England, and is a relative newcomer to Japan. She is frequently seen together with Yakumo, as they are classmates and members of the Tea Club. With her cheerful and positive attitude, she does her best to support Yakumo, particularly on the latter's relationship with Harima and her difficulties with the unwanted attentions of Hanai. She stayed over with Yakumo to accompany her while Tenma was away for the Kyoto trip.

Sarah has several part-time jobs outside school. She is a nun at a local Catholic church, performing duties such as hearing confessions, playing the organ, and babysitting children. She reveals in a conversation with Akira that she may have an eye on someone indicating that she may be a novice; furthermore, at least one hopeful student has expressed interest in her. Aside from her duties as a nun, Sarah also works with Hiroyoshi Asō of 2-C at a Chinese restaurant, waiting tables and cooking. Hiroyoshi Asō may also be her love interest.

Sarah is currently the 7th most popular character in the final popularity poll.

== Other characters ==
=== Takeichi Fuyuki ===
Takeichi Fuyuki (冬木 武一, Fuyuki Takeichi)

Voiced by: Hiroyuki Yoshino (Japanese); Orion Pitts (English)

The class' number 3 pervert, Takeichi Fuyuki pretends to take photos of the girls in the school for the yearbook, but in reality sells them to the other male students. Though he seems to be obsessed with photography and declares that 'taking pictures of the female form are his life', he has also been known to take part in 'set-ups.' He aided Takano and Mikoto when they were trying to set up Tsukamoto (Tenma) and Karasuma. He appeared to be curious about Eri, provoking fans questioning whether he had a crush on her, but this later proves to be wrong. A member of the astronomy club as well as a member of the band, he later becomes close to Tsumugi Yuuki, who also wears glasses. Unfortunately, when he admits his feelings for her she rejects him, as she already has a crush on Hanai.

=== Kentaro Nara ===
Kentaro Nara (奈良 健太郎, Nara Kentarō)

Voiced by: Yūki Tai (Japanese); Todd Haberkorn (English)

Kentarō Nara is a side character who has feelings for Tenma, but his attempts to get closer to her are often foiled by Harima. He is very shy and introvert, but when he gets angry he can be just as frustrated as Harima. He is quite similar to the object of his affections, Tenma. He is now often seen as a reluctant participant in various escapades with Yoshidayama and Nishimoto.

=== Hiroyoshi Aso ===
Hiroyoshi Aso (麻生 広義, Asō Hiroyoshi)

Voiced by: Mitsuhiro Ichiki (Japanese); J. Michael Tatum (English)

The dark horse of 2-C, Hiroyoshi Asō is often seen together with his best friend, Suga. An athletic student, his favorite sport is basketball for which he is slated to become the next boys' team captain and is briefly coaches of the girls' team. He also excels at track events and hockey. Asō's family runs a ramen shop. Working part-time at a Chinese restaurant with Sarah Adiemus, he is known as a good cook.

While Asō is popular among girls, that element of character is displayed more subtly than his other aspects. On the other hand, he does not appear to have much interest in most girls. One exception is Mikoto Suou. He dates Mikoto several times and their relationship progressed to the point of Mikoto's parents inviting him over to dinner. However, they eventually break up for unexplained reasons.

Asō is the 10th most popular character in the final popularity poll, making him the only other male character in the top 10 aside from Harima.

=== Satsuki Tawaraya ===
Satsuki Tawaraya (俵屋 さつき, Tawaraya Satsuki)

Voiced by: Mariya Ise (Japanese); Cherami Leigh (English)

For a short time Aso is interested in dark-blue-haired girl, Satsuki, who, despite being short, is a passionate prodigal basketball player. When Aso briefly coached the new girls' basketball team she had a crush on him where she accidentally confesses to him. After this she is unable to play basketball until she gets over it just before Aso was about to give his answer. Dejected, Lara Gonzales comforts her and they become good friends from then on. She loves eating spicy curry and later wins an eating contest with it for the fifth consecutive time.

=== Ganji Nishimoto ===
Ganji Nishimoto (西本 願司, Nishimoto Ganji)

Voiced by: Shun Takagi (Japanese); Jaime Rivera (English)

Ganji Nishimoto is a huge but timid figure, and is the proud "leader" of the perverts of the class. His family operates a video store, and he is known to host "ero meetings" discussing girls. He is hailed as Buddha Nishimoto (仏の西本, Hotoke no Nishimoto) among other reasons, for his ability to grant the wishes of the students, usually involving erotic material. Some of his lines end with 'dasu (だす)' instead of the normal 'desu (です)' for some unknown reason. While his warm mentor-like demeanor and stash of "treasures" make him popular with many of the males in 2-C, his talents are less appreciated by the girls, especially Mai Otsuka, who has known him for a long time. While he gets along great with most of the boys in his class, he has misgivings about students who actually have girlfriends.

He sits in the "Box Seat," having switched with Tenma under the pretense of having poor eyesight. Most students avoid that seat, since it is directly in front of the teacher. However, Nishimoto immediately recognizes the seat's advantage for his classes with Itoko.

=== Jiro Yoshidayama ===
Jiro Yoshidayama (吉田山 次郎, Yoshidayama Jirō)

Voiced by: Hirotaka Nagase (Japanese, 1st series), Makoto Tomita (OVA, 2nd series), Mike McFarland (English)

Yoshidayama is the delinquent wannabe who dreams of ruling the school, only to see his best laid plans foiled by the fact that there are students much stronger than he is, such as Harima. He has feelings for Eri, but later turns to Tae Anegasaki, the school's infirmary nurse. Yoshidayama plays a lead role when with his two friends Nara and Nishimoto. After bathing, he usually wears his hair in two pigtails, making him look like a female from behind. His birthday is on February 14. However, he does not receive any chocolate from any girls on Valentine's Day, which makes him really depressed. Harima usually mistakenly calls Yoshidayama as Yoshida (吉田). Yoshidayama is a mountain on which Yoshida Shrine is situated, in Northeastern Kyoto.

=== Ryuhei Suga ===
Ryuhei Suga (菅 柳平, Suga Ryūhei)

Voiced by: Makoto Yasumura (Japanese); Robert McCollum (English)

Suga is a close friend of Asou and belongs to the boys' basketball team. In the story he is currently looking for a girlfriend, and is angry that Asou always got the attention of girls. Recently, he has been seen more often with Nishimoto and Yoshidayama, often replacing Nara in the trio of hopeless bachelors. The three of them even made a vow to go through life without a kiss, although soon after the vow, Madoka Kido kisses him (although she did so to silence him after he witnessed her on a date with a man other than her boyfriend). He resembles Hanamichi Sakuragi from the basketball manga and anime Slam Dunk, particularly in the hairstyle aspect.

=== Tsumugi Yuki ===
Tsumugi Yuki (結城 つむぎ, Yūki Tsumugi)

Voiced by: Chisa Tadokoro (Japanese); Laura Bailey (English)

Tsumugi Yūki has severe near-sightedness, and is the only meganekko in the class. She is the substitute class representative when Hanai is unavailable. She also had a crush on him, but is worried about Mikoto, who being a childhood friend of Hanai, gets along well with him. She belongs to the astronomy club and the band. She is usually quite shy but proves to be valiant and strong in some circumstances, such as during the mock 'fight' at the school and when rejecting Fuyuki's advances.

=== Mai Otsuka ===
Mai Otsuka (大塚 舞, Ōtsuka Mai)

Voiced by: Michi Yamazaki (Japanese); Kate Oxley (English)

Mai has been class representative for nine years straight, functioning in this capacity when Hanai is absent or unable to perform his duties. Unlike him however, she has trouble commanding her classmates' attention. Mai has freckles, is hyperactive, and likes fairy tales (though she denies it herself). According to the "ero society" data, she hides a fair-sized bust for some reason. She also likes mahō shōjo, and often imagines herself as the central character of her own show. Mai has known Nishimoto since kindergarten, and disapproves of his unabashed interest in porn.

=== Megumi Sagano ===
Megumi Sagano (嵯峨野 恵, Sagano Megumi)

Voiced by: Ai Horanai (Japanese); Caitlin Glass (English)

Megumi Sagano is close friends with Karen Ichijo and Tsumugi Yuuki. She belonged to the girls' basketball team when she was in junior high, but became the manager for the boys' basketball team because there was no girls' team in high school. Though she seems concerned about her classmates' relationships, she does not seem to care about her own, and thus has no boyfriend. The Sagano Line refers to the portion of the San'in Main Line within Kyoto Prefecture.

=== Kozue Mihara ===
Kozue Mihara (三原 梢, Mihara Kozue)

Voiced by: Madoka Akita (Japanese); Monica Rial (English)

Kozue Mihara is the only kogal in the manga and anime. Kozue is perhaps the trendiest girl in 2-C. She is pretty good at sports running the girls' relay with Mikoto, Eri, and Megumi. She is in class 2-C usually seen with her best friend Saeko in the hall gossiping. She enjoys flirting with Imadori, but is sort of annoyed of Mikoto because of Imadori pestering with Mikoto more than her. She seems to adopt the Kogal look only partway through the series.

=== Noboru Tennoji ===
Noboru Tennoji (天王寺 昇, Tennōji Noboru)

Voiced by: Tomoyuki Shimura (Japanese); Sonny Strait (English)

Tennoji is a delinquent in Class 2-D who he sees Harima as his biggest rival. He has been beaten by him in numerous fights by Harima yet persists in challenging him. When he finally wins one while Harima is depressed, he stops. Tennoji tends to wear his winter uniform even during the summer, and is often shown much larger than he really is. (Note: Later in the series, he is often depicted as tall as a giant who is so large only the top half of his body can be seen. The first incident was during the athletics festival) Near the beginning of the series when Harima sends an anonymous love letter to Tenma, Tennoji shows some initial interest in her.

Tennoji's little sister Mio (美緒) is friends with Harima's brother, Shuji. She has a crush on him, but Shuji doesn't know. Mio does not know Shuji's older brother and vice versa.

=== Itoko Osakabe ===
Voiced by: Yū Asakawa (Japanese); Stephanie Young (English)

The physics teacher and Harima's older cousin, Itoko Osakabe (刑部 絃子, Osakabe Itoko) is Harima's roommate and guardian, although she makes him pay for his share of the rent. She later evicts Harima after he volunteered to become engaged to Eri as a favor, resulting in him residing with Yakumo and Sarah in the Tsukamoto residence. Though she does not show it, she does care for him and realises just how much Tenma has changed him. Her figure is admired by the perverted boys of Class 2-C. She has a fear that her past will get brought up, a weakness which Sasakura uses against her. Her name "Itoko" is homonymous with the word "cousin" in Japanese which makes it a pun. Due to this pun, when Harima says "my cousin" it can be mistaken that he is saying "my Itoko".

Itoko placed 8th in a popularity poll for favorite School Rumble character.

=== Yoko Sasakura ===
Yoko Sasakura (笹倉 葉子 Sasakura Yōko)

Voiced by: Akiko Kurumado (1st series), Aya Hirano (2nd series), Lydia Mackay (English)

The art teacher and an old friend of Itoko, who was her junior during their college years. She seems to know (and share) an important part of Itoko's past, and though not deliberately, has used this against Itoko to gain favors or company a few times. She also grows close to Harima over the series. She has very good driving skills.

=== Tae Anegasaki ===
Tae Anegasaki (姉ヶ崎 妙, Anegasaki Tae)

Voiced by: Sayaka Ohara (Japanese); Colleen Clinkenbeard (English)

The school's infirmary nurse who is also loved by the boys. This has encouraged many boys to get injured or feign injury so that they can get close to her. Prior to taking this job, she briefly let Harima stay at her apartment when his dream of becoming a manga artist was temporarily crushed after he found out that his idol, the manga artist Jō Nijō was really Karasuma. Anegasaki is attracted to Harima and calls him affectionately by his pen name Hario (ハリオ), although Harima has rejected her advances. Her belief in and support of Harima helped him get over his depression and return to school. She later becomes the faculty sponsor for the girls' basketball team.

Harima refers to her as Onee-san (おねーさん; literally Older Sister). For the first five volumes of the manga, she is unnamed, and is referred to in the list of characters by this nickname. The first character of her surname (Ane (姉)) in fact means "older sister" in Japanese, and is the "nee" in "Onee-san".

=== Hayato Tani ===
Hayato Tani (谷 速人, Tani Hayato)

Voiced by: Makoto Yasumura (Japanese); Kent Williams (English)

Class 2-C's homeroom teacher, who teaches English. Tani is very soft-spoken and collects toy dinosaurs. He likes Tae Anegasaki, but every time he tries to hit on her, she clings to Harima affectionately, making him run away in jealousy and shame. He initially thinks Harima is homosexual when the latter accidentally sent him a love letter and asked him out on a date, Tenma being the intended party both times. He is named after a Japanese actor best known for being a mainstay of the Japanese Game show Takeshi's Castle and the 1987 Sentai Series Hikari Sentai Maskman

=== Koriyama ===
Koriyama (郡山, Kōriyama)

Voiced by: Hiroki Yasumoto (Japanese); Jim Foronda (English)

The physical education teacher, often referred by the class of 2-C as Goriyama (ゴリ山; literally gorilla-mountain) due to his gorilla-like physique. His methods are very strict, and he makes it known to every student of Yagami High School (usually Class 2-C) how he thinks a responsible student should behave. Failure to comply with his ideals will result with some sort of disciplinary punishment. His tyrannical personality is very similar to most PE teachers in both Eastern and Western school-related media.

=== Koji Yakushamaru ===
Koji Yakushamaru (役舎丸 広事, Yakushamaru Kōji)

Voiced by: Keiji Fujiwara

As lead actor in the popular samurai drama The Three for the Kill, he plays the role of Mangoku (万石), Harima and Tenma's favorite character. He becomes significant during the class trip to Kyoto, where he meets with Tenma and Eri in a pair of parallel chapters, disguised as a high school student. He is named after Kōji Yakusho, a Japanese actor.

=== Goto brothers ===
Genkai Goto (五島 玄海, Gotō Genkai)

Voiced by: Kōji Ishii (Japanese); Randy Tallman (Season 1), John Swasey (Season 2) (English)

The captain of the fishing boat Kikokumaru who is unsuccessful manga artist. He inspires and motivates Harima to pursue his dream of drawing manga when Harima tries running from his troubles and gives him a pen crafted from a tuna's skeleton. After this, Harima always uses the pen to draw.

Yuzan Goto (五島 雄山, Gotō Yūzan)

Voiced by: Kōji Ishii (Japanese); Bill Jenkins (English)

Yuzan is the gigantic Chief Editor of Weekly Shōnen Zingama where Harima works. When Yakumo shows she is not afraid of him, he tells her to continue helping Harima with editing. Yuzan is always seen with a dog on his shoulder.

=== English exchange students ===
Several male exchange students from England arrive in Yagami High as rivals to many of the characters: Max (マックス, Makkusu); Samuel (サミュエル, Samyueru); Mick (ミック, Mikku); Will (ウィル, Wiru); and Shawn (ショーン, Shōn).

Max, a scar-faced delinquent who attended junior high school with Eri, is the leader of the trio with Samuel and Mick as his underlings. As the story progresses he develops romantic feelings for Eri. Max easily defeats Harima in a match which is stopped by Eri. In a rematch, Harima defeats him after he renews his confidence.

Samuel and Mick are often seen partnered together; Samuel is a burly man with an afro while Mick is a short boy. Samuel has a crush on Tenma causing him to stutter when he first meets her; this makes Tenma think his name is "Sasamuel". Along with Samuel and Max, Will, the bespectacled young man, is often seen with them.

Shawn is a flirtatious playboy who is disliked by the teachers for being a serious delinquent. Due to his looks and womanizing skills, he is adored by many of the schoolgirls. When he tries winning the affections of Karen, it leads to a conflict with Imadori which Imadori eventually wins.

=== Sawachika Servants ===
Nakamura (ナカムラ)

Voiced by: Takeshi Maeda (First Semester), Masami Iwasaki (Second Semester) (Japanese); Kent Williams (English)

The Sawachika family butler and a former soldier, Nakamura, usually seen chauffeuring Eri. His combat skills are sharp, as shown by his performance during class 2-C's survival game. After discovering Eri's crush on Harima, he attempts to get the two together when Harima stays over at the Sawachika's for the night.

Masaru Suzuki (スズキ マサル, Suzuki Masaru)

Voiced by: Hiroki Yasumoto (Japanese); Jeremy Inman (English)

When Nakamura was still a soldier he rescued a young orphan boy from a war-torn country, Masaru Suzuki. He now acts as a "maid" for the Sawachika family under Nakamura. Masaru is an excellent cook who hardly ever speaks.

=== Shuji Harima ===
Shuji Harima (播磨 修治, Harima Shūji)

Voiced by: Yūko Sanpei (Japanese); Jason Liebrecht (English)

Harima has a younger brother, Shuji who has a crush on Yakumo. He is portrayed as being very secretive. Other than their taste in girls, they both get along. (Note: Yakumo could not read his mind despite his crush until he was alone with her.) While Shuji secretly likes Yakumo, he also shows concern for his classmate Mio.

=== Harima's animals ===
Napoleon and Pyotr (ナポレオン, ピョートル, Napoleon, Pyōtoru)

Voiced by: Kaori Shimizu (Napoleon), Mika Kanai (Pyotr)

Harima has a number of animals who get along with him. He is able to communicate with them after he "attained enlightenment" in a gag related to St. Francis of Assisi. The two main animals who are continually used in gags throughout the manga are, Napoleon, a pig and Pyotr, a giraffe. The animals were later moved to the zoo when they were discovered running wild in a nearby Shinto shrine. In the anime, Shuji cooks up a plan to divert a news crew by faking to practice for a play. Pyotr is caught and since the animals care about Harima so deeply, they try their best to prove that they are harmless so that they don't need to be separated. They were still brought to the zoo where they were a big hit with children; and although Harima hates routine, he never broke his habit of visiting the zoo almost every day to see the animals.

== Reception ==
Stig Høgset from THEM Anime Reviews praised the characters' misunderstandings and noted that the viewer will generally root for them. Høgset also commented the English dub is "generally decent." Eduardo M. Chavez from Mania Beyond Entertainment also liked the main cast as well as the romance. In a later review, Chavez said that "Yakumo is by far the most intriguing character in this title" listing her as one of the most entertaining characters in the series. Sakura Eries from the same site was fond on Lala. While Carlo Santos from Anime News Network liked the variety of character designs, he noted "although the second-tier girls still look too much alike with their short black hairstyles." Nevertheless, he complained about the romance which he labelled as "filler". David F. Smith from IGN found the cast likable. Eduardo M. Chavez from Mania notes praised the way that Kobayashi introduces new themes to the second, bringing variety to the setting. Remarking on Kobayashi's ability to draw on numerous influences, Chavez applauds the manga artist for finding fresh ways of using old themes, preventing School Rumble from becoming derivative. He reserves his highest praise for the "flat" chapters dealing with Yakumo.
