= Jin Kobayashi =

Japanese manga artist (born 1977)

Jin Kobayashi 小林 尽
- Born: May 25, 1977 (age 49); Chiba Prefecture, Japan
- Other name: GIN
- Occupation: Manga artist
- Years active: 2000 – present
- Known for: School Rumble, Natsu no Arashi!
- Awards: 65th Weekly Shōnen Magazine's Rookie Award with an honorable mention

Jin Kobayashi (小林 尽, Kobayashi Jin; born May 25, 1977) is a Japanese manga artist, best known for his series School Rumble.

== Overview ==
Kobayashi began drawing manga seriously during his university years, and won an honorable mention at the Weekly Shōnen Magazine's Rookie Award in 2000, allowing him to serialize School Rumble.

He stated to an audience at Honolulu's 2006 Kawaii Kon convention that he started writing the series because he found the idea of a manga involving a delinquent falling in love interesting. His favorite character, Kenji Harima, is based largely on an amalgam of various friends, although he estimates "about 30%" of Harima is a reflection of himself. However, despite putting most of his personal feelings into the female characters, he stated that Ryuhei Suga, a minor supporting character, is the most autobiographical. Most of the other characters are based on memories of former high-school classmates; Kobayashi recalled that he had no real idea of their voices when drawing them, and it was not until much later, when he heard the voice actors' interpretations during the production of the anime series, that he knew how they should sound. He acknowledged that some characters are more developed than others; in reply to a fan question about the mysterious Akira Takano, he admitted that, despite the closeness he feels for her, he did not put much emphasis on Takano and planned to develop her love-life slowly. Kobayashi intentionally centered his story arcs around misunderstandings which he then resolves, since he believes "if there's no misunderstanding then there's no funny story." He claims that none of his stories are based on real-life events, although when pressed admits the possibility of some resemblances but without divulging specific details.

He has made some cameo appearances in the anime adaptation School Rumble, supplying the voice of Sailor F in two episodes of the first season, and being the narrator of the prehistoric segment in the first OVA, School Rumble - First Term Extra.

After completing School Rumble, he said "School Rumble is an important piece that I want to draw more, but I wanted to do more other things so I ended it. When I have some time, I would like to draw their adult days in a seinen magazine."

== Works ==
=== Manga ===
==== Serials ====
- School Rumble (スクールランブル; 2002–2008)
- School Rumble Z (スクールランブルZ; 2008–2009)
- Natsu no Arashi! (夏のあらし！; 2006–2010)
- Ichiro Heian! (一路平安！; 2011-2012)
- Hōkago Mashimashi Club (放課後ましまし倶楽部; artist, 2013-2014) written by Hibari Meguro
- Seiyū Mashimashi Club (声優ましまし倶楽部; artist, 2014-2016) written by Hibari Meguro

==== Short stories ====
- Koiuta (恋歌; 2007-2009) art by Yoshibe Tsuyama (chapter 1) and Haru Emoto (chapter 2)
- Kaettekita Hentai Kamen (帰ってきた変態仮面, Hentai Kamen Returns; 2008) originally created by Keishū Ando

=== Anime ===
- Natsu no Arashi! Akinai-chū (夏のあらし！ 春夏冬中; 2009) ep 12 (script, storyboards)

==== End Card Illustrations ====
- Pani Poni Dash!, ep 21, 2005
- Hidamari Sketch × 365, ep 11, 2008
- ef - a tale of melodies., ep 8, 2009
- Maria Holic, ep 2, 2009
- Bakemonogatari, ep 3, 2009
- Dance in the Vampire Bund, ep 2, 2010
- Hanamaru Kindergarten, ep 1, 2010
- Arakawa Under the Bridge*2, ep 1, 2010
- Puella Magi Madoka Magica, ep 4, 2011

=== Visual Novel ===
- Dai 24 TOKYO Ku (第24TOKYO区, TOKYO 24th District; 2014) illustrator

=== Artbook ===
- Kyōto, Haru. (京都、春。; 2009) joint work with Takashi Takeuchi
