= Dororon Enma-kun =

Japanese manga series

- Cover of Dororon Enma-kun volume 2 (1996) showing the main characters.

ドロロンえん魔くん
- Genre: Horror, comedy, supernatural
- Manga
- Written by: Go Nagai
- Published by: Shogakukan
- Magazine: Weekly Shōnen Sunday and others
- Original run: September 30, 1973 – March 31, 1974
- Volumes: 3
- Manga
- Written by: Go Nagai
- Illustrated by: Tsutomu Oyamada
- Published by: Shogakukan
- Magazine: Shougakukan book
- Original run: September 1973 – March 1974
- Anime television series
- Directed by: Kimio Yabuki
- Music by: Hiroshi Tsutui
- Studio: Toei Animation
- Original network: FNS (Fuji TV)
- Original run: October 4, 1973 – March 28, 1974
- Episodes: 25
- Manga
- Written by: Go Nagai
- Illustrated by: Tsutomu Oyamada
- Published by: Shogakukan
- Magazine: Shogakukan no Yochien
- Original run: October 1973 – April 1974
- Manga
- Written by: Go Nagai
- Illustrated by: Tadashi Makimura
- Published by: Shogakukan
- Magazine: Shogaku Ichinensei
- Original run: October 1973 – March 1974
- Manga
- Written by: Go Nagai
- Illustrated by: Go Nagai; Tsutomu Oyamada (last story)
- Published by: Shogakukan
- Magazine: Shogaku Sannensei
- Original run: October 1973 – April 1974
- Manga
- Written by: Go Nagai
- Illustrated by: Ken Ishikawa
- Published by: Shogakukan
- Magazine: Shogaku Yonnensei
- Original run: October 1973 – April 1974
- Manga
- Written by: Go Nagai
- Illustrated by: Yoshimi Hamada
- Published by: Shogakukan
- Magazine: Shogaku Gonensei
- Original run: October 1973 – April 1974
- Manga
- Written by: Go Nagai
- Illustrated by: Tsutomu Oyamada
- Published by: Shogakukan
- Magazine: Shogaku Rokunensei
- Original run: October 1973 – March 1974
- Manga
- Written by: Go Nagai
- Illustrated by: Mitsuru Hiruta
- Published by: Tokuma Shoten
- Magazine: TV Land
- Original run: October 1973 – March 1974
- Manga
- Written by: Go Nagai
- Illustrated by: Tsutomu Oyamada
- Published by: Shogakukan
- Magazine: Shogaku Ninensei
- Original run: December 1973 – April 1974
- Manga

Enma Jigoku
- Written by: Go Nagai
- Published by: Asahi Sonorama
- Magazine: Manga Shōnen
- Published: September 1978
- Manga

Doki Doki! Enma-kun
- Written by: Go Nagai
- Illustrated by: Koichi Hagane
- Published by: Shogakukan
- Magazine: Coro Coro Comic
- Original run: August 24, 1992 – February 1, 1993
- Manga

Dororon Enbi-chan
- Written by: Go Nagai
- Published by: Sanwa Publishing
- Magazine: Monthly YoungMan
- Original run: December 2000 – June 2001
- Volumes: 1
- Video game

CR Dororon Enma-kun
- Publisher: NewGin
- Genre: Pachinko
- Platform: Arcade
- Released: February 2007
- Manga

Enma vs: Dororon Enma-kun Gaiden
- Written by: Masaki Segawa
- Published by: Shogakukan
- Magazine: Business Jump
- Published: July 21, 2010
- Manga

Shururun Yukiko Hime-chan feat. Dororon Enma-kun
- Written by: Sae Amatsu
- Published by: Kadokawa Shoten
- Magazine: Young Ace
- Original run: November 2010 – April 2011
- Volumes: 1
- Anime television series

Ghastly Prince Enma Burning Up
- Directed by: Yoshitomo Yonetani
- Written by: Yoshitomo Yonetani
- Music by: Keiichi Suzuki
- Studio: Brain's Base
- Licensed by: NA: NIS America
- Original network: MBS, TBS, TV Aichi, TVQ Kyushu Broadcasting, AT-X
- Original run: April 8, 2011 – June 24, 2011
- Episodes: 12

Dororon Enma-kun (ドロロンえん魔くん), also known as Satanikus!, is a Japanese horror-comedy anime and manga series created by Go Nagai. It is one of Nagai's most famous works in Japan, although not very well known in the rest of the world. In 2006, it would get a sequel/remake in Demon Prince Enma, which drops the comedy and becomes a full-fledged suspense-horror series. After the OVA was released, another manga version was released called Satanikus Enma Kerberos by Eiji Toriyama. A remake entitled Ghastly Prince Enma Burning Up aired in Japan in 2011.

== Plot ==
Enma, Yukiko-Hime and Kapaeru are part of the Yokai-Patrol. They go after yokai that have escaped from Hell into the human world.

== Characters ==
=== Main characters ===
Enma (えん魔くん)
Voiced by: Masako Nozawa (1973), Kappei Yamaguchi (2011)
The hot-headed, perverted protagonist, sent by his uncle, King Enma, to arrest yokai that have infiltrated the human world, though most often than not he ends up going overboard and killing them instead. He had long eyebrows that can detect a yokai's presence called the Yokai Antenna, wields a magic cape called the Yokai Cloak (also translated as Night Cape), and a magic staff which can transform into a variety of weapons called the Burning Akuma Power Pole. His other powers include teleportation, flight, x-ray vision, reviving himself at the cost of mana, yelling hard enough to produce hurricane force winds, turning into fox fire, lava resistance, can carry a harpoon separate from his regular gear, and enough strength to stop a rhinoceros. Among the Yokai Cloak's powers include turning into a kunai, grapple hook, or mace attached to a chain strong enough to lift cars, wrapping himself in it to form a tornado, turning it into scissors, turning it into a net, forming a bag with it that emits suction, turning it into a whip, forming a Cape Barrier around himself and others by drawing an Enma Circle on the ground, turning into a chain, forming disguises, turning into a circular saw, turning into a spear, and turning into a key. Among the Burning Akuma Power Pole's powers include emitting fire called the Flame Hose, telekinesis including returning to his hands if separated, extending short distances, spinning the cane into a wheel while enflamed in a technique called the Burning Akuma Fire Wheel, turning into a gladius, turning into a trident, being malleable enough to bend if needed, turning into a baseball bat, turning into a giant shovel, and turning into Mazinger Z's Rocket Punch.
Princess Yukiko (雪子姫)
Voiced by: Sumi Sakai (1973), Mamiko Noto (2011)
A young Yuki-onna princess who is in love with Enma, but often has to put up with his pervertedness. She has powerful ice powers, though more often than not gets captured in a fanserviceable manner. Her powers include teleportation, wall walking, freezing lasers from the left index finger, freezing breath, transmogrifying objects by blowing on them, forming ice skates around her feet, and a flute that nullifies hypnosis.
Kapaeru (カパエル, Kapaeru)
Voiced by: Kaneta Kimotsuki (1973), Takehito Koyasu (2011)
Half kappa, half water sprite. He is the third member of the Yokai Patrol. He doesn't have a lot of attacks, but still provides some help in battle. He's often confused for a frog, which makes him very angry. His name is a portmanteau of 'kappa' and 'kaeru' ("frog" in Japanese). His powers include teleportation, wall walking, body stretching, swimming, frog hopping, toxin resistance, and spraying water from the scalp.
Chapeauji (シャポーじい, Shapōjii)
Voiced by: Junpei Takiguchi (1973), Minoru Inaba (2011)
An "old man" yokai who looks like a hat and guides Enma-kun. His name is a portmanteau of 'chapeau' and 'ouji' ("old man" in Japanese). His only power is levitation.
Tsutomu (ツトムくん)
Voiced by: Takako Kondo (1973), Rumi Shishido (2011)
A human boy that befriends the Yokai Patrol. He attends the local elementary school, and always gets attacked by demons. He is a side character in the 2011 anime.
Tobatiri (トバッチリ, Tobacchiri)
Voiced by: Akira Shimada (1973), Daiki Nakamura (2011)
Tsutomu's teacher. He's merely a comic relief, and always yelling at Tsutomu-kun.
Ms. Chiko (ちぃ子先生, Chiiko-sensei)
Voiced by: Kikuko Inoue (2011)
A human elementary school teacher, wealthy landowner living in a mansion with several maids, and physical education instructor who is a top graduate from a prestigious women's university. In the original manga, her personality is strict and sadistic, heavily featuring sports activities while enjoying punishing her masochistic students. In the 2011 anime adaptation, her personality is significantly tamer, portrayed as a kind, easygoing, reliable, and approachable teacher deeply loved by the school, though she still exhibits wildly daring outfits such as a microscopic pink slingshot bikini during swimming lessons and over-the-top sex education lectures.
In Episode 2, while leading a field trip to an amusement park, she diligently checks on her students in the haunted house to ensure no one is lagging behind and reminds them to meet at the lunch spot. Upon exiting, she is engulfed and possessed by Dokuro's black mist, transforming her normally easygoing nature into an ultra-violent, rage-filled menace.
Daracura (ダラキュラ, Darakyura)
Voiced by: Takuzou Kamiyama (1973), Hideyuki Umezu (2011)
A homeless deadbeat, Daracura was originally an officer for Great King Enma. After losing his position of officer, Daracura tried throughout the series to kill Enma-kun. However, as the series progressed Daracura became less important.
Harumi (ハルミ)
Voiced by: Reiko Katsura (1973), Ayako Kawasumi (2011)
Tsutomu's girlfriend. Her mother has passed on, and lives with her father in an apartment complex. She replaces Tsutomu as one of the main protagonists in the 2011 anime.
Great King Enma (閻魔大王, Enma Daiō)
Voiced by: Hidekatsu Shibata (1973), Norio Wakamoto (2011)
The Judge of Hell and Enma's uncle who only appears in episodes 8, 12, 15, 21, and 25. He sends Enma-kun and his friends to arrest demons on Earth. In the last five episodes of the original series he grants the Yokai Patrol his boat called the Dororon (Ghastly) Boat which was capable of super sonic flight and had a bow horn capable of piercing diamond. His powers include dual lightning staffs, energy bolts from the fingers, capture bubbles from the right palm, hurricane force winds from the mouth, and red energy rays from the right index fingers that can revive dead yokai.
Enbi (艶靡ちゃん)
Voiced by: Rumi Shishido (2011)
Enma's sister; the protagonist of the spin-off manga, Dororon Enbi-chan, and an antagonist in the 2011 anime. She has her own versions of Yukiko-Hime and Kapaeru named Yukiko-Hige and Kapaku.

=== Rogue Yokai ===
- Shibireyanagi: Appears in episode 1. Powers include intangibility and constricting vines.
- Hebitsubo: Appears in episode 1. Powers include intangibility and eight gray snakes in his head.
- Denkianma: Appears in episode 1. Powers include intangibility, four arms, emitting electric shocks, and summoning a cyclone.
- Burarijii: Appears in episode 2. Powers include intangibility, a constricting tongue that ages organisms, ceiling hanging
- Mukadegarami: Appears in episode 2. Powers include venomous fans from the mouths in both centipede heads, turning into a shadow, intangibility, and a pincer on the centipede tail.
- Magonote: Appears in episode 3. Powers include shadow manipulation, a human disguise, sharp nails with venom that causes animals to jump constantly, flight, a second pair of arms capable of extending and with a red eye in the palms, regeneration, and controlling severed body parts.
- Kusarigama: Appears in episode 3. Powers include swimming, green toxic gas from the mouth, a kama for the left arm, a chained wrecking ball, a long tongue, and water spouts in the back.
- Tatamigaeshi: Appears in episode 4. Powers include teleportation, controlling flat objects and floors, spawning illusions of himself, turning humans into vampires just by being near him long enough, and water manipulation.
- Barbara: Appears in episode 5. Powers include thorny vines from the head, burrowing, red thorns for the fingers, gray thorns on the arms, telekinesis, spawning killer nurses, and storing body parts into a subspace.
- Jigokuokuri: Appears in episode 6. Powers include a human disguise and immunity to yokai senses
- Oyamari: Appears in episode 6. Powers include a taxi cab disguise induces sleep, turns the chairs into clay, and emit intense heat, teleportation, levitation, emitting fire from the body, and possessing discarded cars and motorcycles upon death until they are hit with sunlight.
- Asunarokozou: Appears in episode 7. Powers include a human disguise, a low body temperature, hypnosis, and turning into smoke if frozen and emitting smoke from the mouth.
- Mimizuki: Appears in episode 8. Powers include flight, a staff that emits hypnotic waves to induce fear and can become intangible, teleportation, hurricane-force winds from the wings, talons for the fingers and toes, and spawning an ear-like subspace in the sky.
- Kobanzame: Appears in episode 9. Powers include high jumping, blood draining fangs that can turn animals violent and rapidly decay upon death, teleportation, disaster prediction, and intangibility.
- Dokuro: Appears in episode 9. Powers include a long tongue, a pendulum bladed staff, eating souls, invisibility, turning into smoke, flight, and emitting a barrier of smoke from the mouth.
  - Kyuusuichou: Powers include flight, turning organisms to stone via draining their moisture through her tongue, growth, spawning clones of herself, and exploding into water upon death.
- Amejyorou: Appears in episode 11. Powers include a human disguise, spewing brown toxic sludge from the mouth that causes lethal fevers, and flight.
- Kaminarijishi: Appears in episode 11. Powers include flight and emitting lightning from the mane.
- Hihijii: Appears in episode 12. Powers include a human disguise, a fire based body capable of dividing into pieces and stretching, swimming, and flight.
- Kamaitachi: Appears in episode 13. Powers include a scythe blade for each arm, flight, and dividing into three bodies.
  - Obaba: Her only known power is a staff that emits lightning and ropes.
- Nenrikibou: Appears in episode 14. Powers include telekinesis, summoning cyclones and thunder storms, communicating with birds, chest hairs that can wrap around smaller enemies, and causing volcanoes to erupt upon command.
- Chinbotsunamazu: Appears in episode 15. Powers include swimming, a pair of constricting whiskers that can spawn extra eyes, burrowing
- Kamenbou: Appears in episode 15. Powers include swimming and face alteration.
- Zouwashi: Appears in episode 16. Powers include a constricting trunk that can release lava and fire, flight, talons, twin tusks, hurricane winds from the wings, camouflage, lava immunity, and regeneration.
- Yukinyudou: Appears in episode 17. Powers include summoning blizzards, freezing mist from the fingers on the right hand, and icy winds from the mouth.
- Yamamori: Appears in episode 17. Powers include manipulating the earth around him to cause fissures and rock slides, summoning crows, a rocky body with rotating limb sockets, lava immunity, levitation, and rotating fast enough to form a tornado.
- Iyomanto: Appears in episode 18. Powers include a shapeshifting bear cloak capable of flight, fire resistance, teleportation, and emitting lightning from the body.
- Madoromin: Appears in episode 19. Powers include a flying boat that emits pink sleeping gas, summoning a large purple snake, and summoning Omezame.
- Hiyakute: Appears in episode 19. His only known power is twelve extendable hands from the neck.
- Kogarashikozou: Appears in episode 20. Powers include turning into a whirlwind, hypnotic whistling that controls animals, wind manipulation, spewing needles from the mouth, dividing his body into four pieces, telekinesis, and turning wind into spears.
- Ghoship: Appears in episode 21. Powers include flight, spewing demonic bats and spiders from the mouth, mouth fog that nullifies bat goo and dowse fire, a bow horn in the forehead that fires demonic spiders and can extend short distances, and turning his hull into diamond.
- Sunekozou: Appears in episode 22. Powers include turning into clay and possessing organisms.
- Amanojyaku: Appears in episode 22. Powers include flight, wind gusts from the hands and mouth, and emitting lightning from his black cloud.
- Ororon: Appears in episode 23. Powers include a human disguise, strength that can flip a bulldozer, a pair of dynamite sticks, levitation, size changing, and fire resistance.
- Ryuugyo: Appears in episode 24.Power include swimming, sharp teeth, an extendable tail with a fan-like fin at the end that can summon heavy rain just by spinning capable of flooding places the size of Tokyo, regenerative scales, and high jumping.
- Takotsunami: Appears in episode 24. Powers include Powers include swimming, water manipulation to create giant waves, a giant left hand for the upper half of his body, and eight stubby tentacles that allow for high jumping.
- Daikinkai: Appears in episode 25. Powers include granting midas curses to animals that transmute matter into gold upon physical contact, emitting a light that turns organisms into gold, breaking his body down to form different shapes, flight, three stalagmites on the head that can detach to be used as daggers, and body energy beams.
- Toragozen: Appears in episode 25. Powers include hypnotic eyes, agility, and high jumping.
- Detayou: Appears in episode 25. His only power is a third hand on the scalp.
  - Harinezumikozou: Appears in episode 25. His only known power is a constricting tail.
  - Hachinosunyuudou: Appears in episode 25. She has no known powers.
  - Shishishimai: Appears in episode 25. They have no known powers.
  - Saijyou: Appears in episode 25. She has no known powers.
  - Onioshidaishi: Appears in episode 25.He has no known powers.

== Media ==
=== Anime ===
The original anime was produced by Toei Animation and was originally broadcast on Fuji TV from October 4, 1973, to March 28, 1974. The opening theme was "Dororon Enma-kun" (ドロロンえん魔くん) and the ending theme was "Beware of Yokai" (妖怪にご用心, Yōkai ni go Yōjin), both performed by Chinatsu Nakayama. An original video animation of the sequel manga, Demon Prince Enma, was produced by Brain's Base and was released in four volumes released between August 25, 2006, and March 23, 2007. The OVA is licensed in North America by Bandai Entertainment. A remake of the original series, titled Dororon Enma-kun Meeramera (Dororonえん魔くん メ~ラめら), was produced by Brain's Base and aired on MBS between April 7, 2011, and June 24, 2011. The opening theme is "Soul Burning at 1,000,000,000°C!!" (魂メラめら一兆°C!, Tamashii Meramera Icchō °C!) by Masaaki Endoh and the Moonriders, whilst the ending theme is "Everybody's Exhausted ZZZ" (みんなくたばるサァサァサァ, Minna Kutabaru Sasasa) by The Moonriders feat. Yoko. NIS America licensed the series in North America under the title Ghastly Prince Enma Burning Up and released the series on subtitled DVD and Blu-ray Disc on September 11, 2012.

=== Manga ===
The main version of the manga was originally serialized in Shogakukan's magazine Weekly Shōnen Sunday from September 30, 1973, to March 31, 1974.

Besides Weekly Shōnen Sunday version, other serializations were published at the time in various Shogakukan's children magazines and in Tokuma Shoten's TV Land, drawn by Nagai and several of his assistants.

Magazine	Original run	Artist
Shougakukan book	September 1973 – March 1974	Tsutomu Oyamada
Yochien	October 1973 – April 1974	Tsutomu Oyamada
Shogaku Ichinensei	October 1973 – March 1974	Tadashi Makimura
Shogaku Ninensei	December 1973 – April 1974	Kiyoshi Takenaka
Shogaku Sannensei		Go Nagai, Ken Ishikawa
Shogaku Yonnensei		Ken Ishikawa
Shogaku Gonensei		Yoshimi Hamada
Shogaku Rokunensei	October 1973 – March 1974	Tsutomu Oyamada
TV Land	October 1973 – April 1974	Osamu Hiramatsu, Mitsuru Hiruta
Yoiko		Tomotaka Iwasawa

==== Volumes ====
The series published in Weekly Shōnen Sunday has been compiled in volumes several times.

Wakagi Shobo (Comic Mate, 1974)
#	Release date
1	April 5, 1974
2	May 5, 1974
3	June 25, 1974

Wakagi Shobo (Comic Mate, 1979)
#	Release date
1	March 25, 1979
2	March 25, 1979
3	March 25, 1979

Asahi Sonorama (Sun Wide Comics, 1985)
#	Release date	ISBN
1	September 20, 1985	978-4257960522
2	October 25, 1985	978-4257960553

Chuokoron-sha (Chuko Aizoban, 1991)
#	Release date	ISBN
1	July 20, 1991	978-4120020278

Chuokoron-sha (Chuko Bunko Comic Han, 1996)
#	Release date	ISBN
1	March 18, 1996	978-4122025714
2	March 18, 1996	978-4122025721

Kodansha (KP Comics, 2003)
#	Release date	ISBN
1	August 20, 2003	978-4063530988
2	September 24, 2003	978-4063531114

Goma Books (Goma Comics, 2006)
#	Release date	ISBN
1	August 25, 2006	978-4777190515
2	October 25, 2006	978-4777190522

This version is also available in ebook format, published by ebookjapan.

=== Sequels ===
==== Short stories ====
- Enma Jigoku (炎魔地獄), a one-shot story, was published in the September 1978 issue of Asahi Sonorama' Manga Shōnen. In this story, the characters are older. Since its publication, this manga has been compiled in all tankōbon as the last story with the title Enma Jigoku no Kan (炎魔地獄の巻).
- Doki Doki! Enma-kun (ドキドキ!えん魔くん), drawn by Koichi Hagane, a short manga published by Shogakukan on August 24, 1992 in Coro Coro Comic and on December 1, 1992, and February 1, 1993, in Bessatsu Coro Coro Comic Special.
- Enma vs: Dororon Enma-kun Gaiden (炎魔VS〜ドロロンえん魔くん外伝〜), a seinen manga by Masaki Segawa, is a 38-page one-shot story published on July 7, 2010 (cover date July 21, 2010) published in Shueisha's Business Jump.

==== Dororon Enbi-chan ====
Dororon Enbi-chan (どろろん艶靡ちゃん), published from December 2000 to June 2001 in the magazine Monthly YoungMan by Sanwa Publishing. This is an adult-restricted erotic comedy.

===== Volumes =====
No.	Release date	ISBN
1	November 17, 2001	978-4-88356-102-5

==== Kikoushi Enma ====
Kikoushi Enma (鬼公子炎魔, kikōshi Enma; Demon Prince Enma) is a sequel of the original manga by Go Nagai with a mature tone, where the characters are no longer children, published in Kodansha's Magazine Z from March 25, 2006 (cover date May 2006) to May 26, 2006 (cover date July 2006.)

==== Satanikus ENMA Kerberos ====
Satanikus ENMA Kerberos (Satanikus ENMA ケルベロス, satanikus enma keruberosu) is a sequel of Kikoushi Enma by Eiji Karasuyama, published in Kodansha's Magazine Z from June 26, 2007 (cover date August 2007) to January 26, 2009 (cover date March 2009.)

==== Shururun Yukiko Hime-chan: feat. Dororon Enma-kun ====
Shururun Yukikohime-chan feat. Dororon Enma-kun (シュルルン雪子姫ちゃん feat.ドロロンえん魔くん) is a seinen manga written and drawn by Sae Amatsu and released alongside Dororon Enma-kun Meeramera. It was serialized on Kadokawa Shoten's magazine Young Ace from October 4, 2010 (cover date November 2010) to March 4, 2011 (cover date April 2011).

===== Volumes =====
No.	Release date	ISBN
1	April 4, 2011	978-4-04-715678-4
