= List of The Big O chapters =

The cover of the first volume of The Big O manga released in North America by Viz Media on November 5, 2002.

This is a list of chapters of the manga adaptation of Sunrise's The Big O (THE ビッグオー, Za Biggu Ō) anime television series. The chapters are written and drawn by Hitoshi Ariga and published by Kodansha in Magazine Z.

The Big O was conceived as a media franchise. To this effect, Sunrise requested a manga be produced along with the animated series. The Big O manga started serialization in Kodansha's Magazine Z in July 1999, three months before the anime premiere. Authored by Hitoshi Ariga, the manga uses Keiichi Sato's concept designs in an all-new story. The series ended in October 2001. The issues were later collected in six volumes. The English version of the manga is published by VIZ Media.

In anticipation to the broadcast of the second season, a new manga series was published. Lost Memory (ロストメモリー, Rosuto Memorī), authored by Hitoshi Ariga, takes place between volumes five and six of the original manga. The issues, serialized in Magazine Z from November 2002 to September 2003, were collected in two volumes. No English official translation is available.

== Volumes ==
=== Original manga ===
No.	Original release date	Original ISBN	English release date	English ISBN
1	December 16, 1999	978-4-06-349005-3	November 5, 2002	978-1-59116-039-7
Chapter 00: "Prologue"; Chapter 01: "Take Back a Memory"; Chapter 02: "Electric Bug"; Chapter 03: "Thy Name is Dorothy"; Omake: Making of The Big O
2	March 23, 2000	978-4-06-349014-5	May 7, 2003	978-1-56931-806-5
Chapter 04: "Sisters Dorothy"; Chapter 05: "A Ghost Ship & A Fallen Angel"; Chapter 06: "No Name No Memory No Future"; Chapter 07: "Tief Im Schwarzwald"; Omake: Paradigme Gallery; Making of The Big O
3	October 23, 2000	978-4-06-349033-6	July 2, 2003	978-1-56931-827-0
Chapter 08: "Big O Vs. Big O"; Chapter 09: "My Sweetheart Dorothy"; Chapter 10: "I Wish Have a Monster"; Chapter 11: "Drinks, Oldster & Memory"; Omake: Paradigme Gallery; Making of The Big O
4	March 23, 2001	978-4-06-349047-3	October 1, 2003	978-1-56931-977-2
Chapter 12: "Remember Me"; Chapter 13: "Godhead"; Chapter 14: "The Sun Will Rise"; Omake: Paradigme Gallery; Making of The Big O
5	August 23, 2001	978-4-06-349065-7	December 31, 2003	978-1-59116-108-0
Chapter 15: "Another Face"; Chapter 16: "Inside of Darkness"; Chapter 17: "A Former Life"; Omake: Paradigme Gallery; Making of The Big O
6	December 21, 2001	978-4-06-349079-4	April 7, 2004	978-1-59116-219-3
Chapter 18: "R-Dorothy"; Chapter 19: "Angel"; Chapter 20: "Core"; Chapter 21: "Roger"; Omake: Paradigme Gallery; Making of The Big O

=== Lost Memory ===
No.	Release date	ISBN
1	March 20, 2003	978-4-06-349121-0
Chapter 01: "Long Vacation"; Chapter 02: "Old Wives' Tale"; Chapter 03: "Show up"; Chapter 04: "Trick or Treat"; Chapter 05: "Meet by Chance"; Omake: Paradigme Gallery; Making of The Big O
2	October 23, 2003	978-4-06-349151-7
Chapter 06: "Electric Sheep in the Cradle"; Chapter 07: "Message"; Chapter 08: "Old Movie Star"; Chapter 09: "Revival"; Chapter 10: "Yesterday Once More"
