= Takewaki =

Takewaki (written: 竹脇) is a Japanese surname. Notable people with the surname include:

- Muga Takewaki (竹脇 無我, 1944–2011), Japanese actor
- Naomi Takewaki (竹脇 直巳, born 1964), Japanese bobsledder

== See also ==
- Takeaki
