= Iwaki =

Iwaki (岩城、磐城) may refer to:

== Places ==
- Iwaki, Fukushima (いわき市), a city in Japan
- Iwaki, Akita (岩城町), a former town in Japan
- Iwaki, Aomori (岩木町), a former town in Japan
- Iwaki Province (718) (岩城国), an old province of Japan established in 718 and dissolved by 724
- Iwaki Province (1868) (磐城国), an old province of Japan established in 1868
- Iwaki River (岩木川), a river in Aomori Prefecture, northern Japan
- Mount Iwaki (岩木山), a volcano in Aomori Prefecture, northern Japan
- Mount Iwaki (Yamaguchi) (石城山), a mountain in Yamaguchi Prefecture, northern Japan

== Surname ==
- Iwaki clan: a Japanese clan that ruled the Hamadōri area
- Hiroyuki Iwaki (岩城 宏之; 1932–2006), Japanese conductor and percussionist
- Kōichi Iwaki (岩城 滉一; born 1951), Japanese actor
- Mitsuhide Iwaki (岩城 光英; born 1949), Japanese politician of the Liberal Democratic Party
- Nobuko Iwaki (井脇 ノブ子; born 1946), Japanese politician of the Liberal Democratic Party
- Mirai Iwaki (岩城 未来), a fictional character in the manga Guru Guru Pon-chan
