= List of Ghost Hunt chapters =

Cover of the first volume of the English-release of the manga adaptation

Written and illustrated by Ono Fuyumi, the chapters of the Ghost Hunt manga premiered in Kodansha's shōjo manga magazine Amie in 1998, then moved to sister publication Nakayoshi. After this, the series moved to being published in volumes only. The series was completed in September 2010 with the twelfth and final volume. The manga was licensed for an English-language release in North America by Del Rey Manga, which has released eleven volumes of the series. Ghost Hunt is licensed for release in the United Kingdom by Tanoshimi.

A sequel manga titled Akumu no Sumu Ie: Ghost Hunt was published in Aria from 2012 to 2016, compiled into three volumes.

The series focuses on the work of the Shibuya Psychic Research Center, particularly its teenage manager Kazuya Shibuya and Mai Taniyama, a first-year high schooler who becomes his assistant after his usual assistant, Lin, is hurt while they are working on a case at Mai's school. They are joined by a monk, a self-styled shrine maiden, a medium, and an Australian Catholic Priest. The manga has been adapted into a twenty-five episode anime series by J.C.Staff that premiered in Japan on October 3, 2006, on TV Aichi, where it ran until its conclusion.

== Ghost Hunt ==
No.	Original release date	Original ISBN	North America release date	North America ISBN
1	June 1998	978-4-061-78894-7	September 27, 2005	978-0-345-48624-0
Ghost Hunt, Volume 1
2	March 1999	978-4-061-78912-8	December 27, 2005	978-0-345-48625-7
Doll House, File 1; Doll House, File 2; Doll House, File 3; Doll House, File 4; Ghost Hunt, Side Story: Ghost Stories in the Park!?
3	October 1999	978-4-061-78923-4	March 28, 2006	978-0-345-48626-4
After School Curse, File 1; After School Curse, File 2; After School Curse, File 3; After School Curse, File 4; After School Curse, File 5; After School Curse, File 6; Ghost Hunt, Bonus Story: Go! Go! Ghost Hunters!
4	July 2000	978-4-061-78941-8	June 27, 2006	978-0-345-48680-6
A Forbidden Game, File 1; A Forbidden Game, File 2; A Forbidden Game, File 3; Ghost Hunt, Side Story: Silent Christmas
5	January 2001	978-4-061-78953-1	September 26, 2006	978-0-345-49137-4
A Forbidden Game, File 4; A Forbidden Game, File 5; A Forbidden Game, File 6; A Forbidden Game, File 7; A Forbidden Game, File 8
6	October 2001	978-4-061-78974-6	December 26, 2006	978-0-345-49138-1
The Bloodstained Labyrinth, File 1; The Bloodstained Labyrinth, File 2; The Bloodstained Labyrinth, File 3; The Bloodstained Labyrinth, File 4; The Bloodstained Labyrinth, File 5
7	March 2, 2002	978-4-061-78990-6	March 27, 2007	978-0-345-49139-8
The Bloodstained Labyrinth, File 6; The Bloodstained Labyrinth, File 7; The Bloodstained Labyrinth, File 8; The Bloodstained Labyrinth, File 9; The Bloodstained Labyrinth, File 10
8	July 4, 2003	978-4-063-64025-0	June 26, 2007	978-0-345-49140-4
The Cursed House, File 1; The Cursed House, File 2; The Cursed House, File 3; The Cursed House, File 4
9	February 6, 2006	978-4-063-64080-9	September 25, 2007	978-0-345-49824-3
The Cursed House, File 5; The Cursed House, File 6; The Cursed House, File 7; The Cursed House, File 8; The Cursed House, File 9
10	April 11, 2008	978-4-063-64130-1	August 2009	978-0-345-50134-9
The Forgotten Children, File 1; The Forgotten Children, File 2; The Forgotten Children, File 3; The Forgotten Children, File 4; The Forgotten Children, File 5
11	August 6, 2009	978-4-063-64130-1	November 23, 2010	978-0-345-50135-6
The Forgotten Children, File 6; The Forgotten Children, File 7; The Forgotten Children, File 8; The Forgotten Children, File 9
12	September 30, 2010	978-4-063-64266-7	—	—
The Forgotten Children

== Akumu no Sumu Ie: Ghost Hunt ==
No.	Japan release date	Japan ISBN
1	June 7, 2013	978-4-063-80635-9
Chapter 1; Chapter 2; Chapter 3; Chapter 4; Chapter 5
2	April 7, 2014	978-4-063-80686-1
Chapter 6; Chapter 7; Chapter 8; Chapter 9; Chapter 10
3	October 7, 2016	978-4-063-80878-0
Chapter 11; Chapter 12; Chapter 13; Chapter 14; Chapter 15; Chapter 16; Chapter 17; Chapter 18; Chapter 19; Chapter 20; Chapter 21; Epilogue; Extra Chapter 1; Extra Chapter 2
