= Magikano =

Japanese manga series and its adaptation

- Cover of the first manga volume

マジカノ
- Genre: Harem, magical girl, romantic comedy
- Manga
- Written by: Takeaki Momose
- Published by: Kodansha
- Magazine: Monthly Magazine Z
- Original run: April 2003 – May 2008
- Volumes: 10
- Anime television series
- Directed by: Seiji Kishi
- Written by: Hideki Mitsui
- Music by: Katsuyuki Harada
- Studio: Tokyo Kids
- Licensed by: Crunchyroll
- Original network: Chiba TV, TV Saitama, tvk, AT-X
- English network: SEA: Animax Asia; US: Anime Network
- Original run: January 3, 2006 – March 28, 2006
- Episodes: 13

Magikano (マジカノ, Majikano; "Magical Girlfriend") is a Japanese manga series by Takeaki Momose, which was later adapted into an anime series, directed by Seiji Kishi and written by Hideki Mitsui. The anime series was also broadcast by Animax, who adapted and dubbed the series into English for broadcast across its English language networks in Southeast Asia and South Asia from February 2007, where the series received its English language premiere.

ADV Films has licensed the rights for the North American release of Magikano on DVD, and released the first volume on December 4, 2007. ADV Films' Anime Network began airing the anime on January 3, 2008, on their Subscription On Demand platform. On March 6, 2008, the anime began airing on their Free On Demand platform. In July 2008, the series became one of over 30 ADV titles to be transferred to Funimation.

== Plot ==
Ayumi Mamiya is a cursed witch to lose her powers and only one boy can break the spell. Haruo Yoshikawa thinks he is a normal boy, but unknown to him his three sisters have magical powers and keep him protected and ignorant about the existence of magic. Now Ayumi must wake up Haruo's latent powers to save himself, but his sisters will have none of that.

== Characters ==
Haruo Yoshikawa (吉川 春生, Yoshikawa Haruo)
Voiced by: Mitsuhiro Ichiki (Japanese); Clint Bickham (English)
Haruo is an average junior high school boy who has a perfect attendance record at school and doesn't have any long-term goals aside from living a long life. He lives with his three younger sisters and has no idea that they are mahoutsukai (magic users). Haruo has latent magic powers, but he is not aware of this, believing he and his family are perfectly ordinary. His powers are revealed to be extraordinary on two occasions: first when a ghost takes over his spirit and is able to channel extreme power through him, and secondly when Michiru kidnaps him during a school play and, in his anger over how she has hurt his friends, he awakens and is able to blow apart her castle and transport everyone home (along with turning back time so no one except Michiru remembers the event). Maika and his other sisters usually ensure that Haruo is kept unaware of their magic through liberal application of magic memory-erasing hammers (no less than three hammers simultaneously at times). It is shown that this is done so often that he occasionally seems slightly aware of the erasure, asking if "something happened" and once stating he had a lot of gaps in his memory recently. He seems somewhat naive, and always in the dark about the feelings of people (mainly women who like him) around him. However, he cares about the well-being of others. He seems to mostly want a quiet life; he is often showing trying to relax and do normal things such as watch TV or just hang out. He seems wary of his sisters' antics and is reluctant to get involved in schemes, but he will be kind and always help if he can. Haruo is in his third year of junior high school (grade 9), in classroom B. Halfway through the manga series, he accidentally finds out about magic but initially thinks his sisters are possessed demons, until his latent magic powers awaken after a misadventure. However, after this he still has a hard time believing in magic. In the last episode of the anime, Haruo is revealed to be an avatar, or incarnation of the Demon Lord/Maoh. "Haru" means "spring" in Japanese, as he is the oldest in his family.
Ayumi Mamiya (魔宮 あゆみ, Mamiya Ayumi)
Voiced by: Sakura Nogawa (Japanese); Jessica Boone (English)
Ayumi Mamiya is a young witch who was cursed during her childhood. The only one who can lift this curse is Haruo Yoshikawa, which forces her to study at the same school and move into the Yoshikawa residence as a maid. For most of the series, Ayumi flirts with and casts spells on Haruo in order to seduce him and "make him a man". Because of this, she and Maika constantly argue and get into fights - which Ayumi inevitably loses. She claims that her curse is the reason for her seduction attempts, although in the last episode, it is revealed that she has truly come to love him.
Maika Yoshikawa (吉川 舞夏, Yoshikawa Maika)
Voiced by: Mai Nakahara (Japanese); Kira Vincent-Davis (English)
Maika is the oldest daughter of the Yoshikawa family. She can use magic and loves cooking for her brother and sisters. She has long lilac-colored hair, often tied back with green ribbons. She is very protective of her brother Haruo, and was immediately suspicious of Ayumi's intentions (which were justified). The others often accuse her of having a brother complex. Hints of this occur as she tries to get closer to him and even comments on how "hot" he is. As a toddler she "brainwashed" Haruo in his sleep by chanting "Big Brother and Maika together forever" repeatedly, and her usually caring and ladylike personality is replaced by a possessive jealousy whenever any female tries to get closer to her brother. She is even able to transform into a green-skinned demon when she becomes especially jealous. "Ka" means "summer" in Japanese, as she is the second oldest in the Yoshikawa family.
Chiaki Yoshikawa (吉川 千秋, Yoshikawa Chiaki)
Voiced by: Kanako Sakai (Japanese); Luci Christian (English)
Chiaki is the middle sister of the Yoshikawa family. She can also use magic and loves working out and eating food. She has long, violet hair, often tied back with a red ribbon. She is somewhat clueless, yet honest and sincere, and completely without guile and malice and the most normal of the sisters. "Aki" means "Autumn" in Japanese, as she is the third born in her family.
Fuyuno Yoshikawa (吉川 冬乃, Yoshikawa Fuyuno)
Voiced by: Tomoko Kaneda (Japanese); Hilary Haag (English)
Fuyuno is the youngest sister of the Yoshikawa family. She can also use magic and loves just about anything that involves making money, often fantasizing about swimming in oodles of cash. This is a subject that makes her adopt the demeanor (and voice) of a Scrooge-like miser. Many times, she comes up with ways to explain away magical events to non-magic people and is fantastic at problem-solving. She has short periwinkle hair with a yellow and black ribbon. "Fuyu" means "winter" in Japanese, as she is the youngest in her family.
Hajime Hario (針生 ハジメ, Hario Hajime)
Voiced by: Katsuhiro Harasawa (Japanese); Greg Ayres (English)
A friend of Haruo's from his class. Hajime is generally loud, outspoken, and always on the lookout for girls. The sound of a rooster call typically follows him due to his red mohawk giving him a rooster-like appearance, but only in the anime. Hajime is one of the two members of the "Supernatural Science Club", and thus constantly shows up whenever incidents mainly caused by the witches occur. Because of this, he and Sora are frequent victims of the memory-loss hammers.
Sora Fujiwara (藤原 宇宙, Fujiwara Sora)
Voiced by: Sachie Abe
Another friend and classmate of Haruo's, Sora is a boy with glasses who has no dialogue and "speaks" by taking pictures. But somehow others (especially Hajime) know what he's saying. He is always seen with his camera. In the original manga, Sora did not wear glasses and spoke. Sora is one of the two members of the "Supernatural Science Club".
Yuri Kurosu (黒須 ゆり, Kurosu Yuri)
Voiced by: Noriko Namiki (Japanese); Carli Mosier (English)
Yuri is the school's top idol and the student council president, but she gets some unwelcome competition when Ayumi transfers in. She met Haruo when she was a little girl, and instantly fell in love. She once even made a bento for Haruo, only to be thwarted by Maika. Her hair changes color (black to blue/silver) when she uses her battle magic, and instead of a broom or wand, she has a large sword she rides like a surfboard. Yuri is still in love with Haruo, and has indecent dreams about him, and gets irrationally angry when Ayumi is with him. She often claims that Ayumi's behavior is "Against School Policy" as an excuse to see Haruo, since she, as Student President, must see that all rules are followed. Her name yuri is actually a pun on the genre as many of the female students have the hots for her including the SC vice president. Hajime has even come up with a fantasy fetish in which she and Ayumi are about to kiss.
Marin Nijihara (虹原 真鈴, Nijihara Marin)
Voiced by: Haruko Momoi (Japanese); Hannah Alcorn (English)
A Catholic witch hunter who thinks that Haruo was sent from heaven and needs protection from witches (especially Ayumi). She works with Ayumi, Yuri, and/or Maika whenever she feels that they have a common cause. Marin is an incompetent and clumsy fool whose attacks inflict more damage on herself than any of the "evil witches" that she so adamantly hunts. It's unclear whether Marin has deeper feelings for Haruo, or if she just admires him for what she calls "keeping away evil witches". A hint of this is shown when she fantasizes about her and Haruo beating the Yoshikawa sisters together. Marin has never purified any witch (except for the witch she purified in Michiru's world). Many jokes seem to imply she is not as wealthy as others.
Rika Anju (杏樹 リカ, Anju Rika)
Voiced by: Nana Inoue (Japanese); Tiffany Grant (English)
An enigmatic maid sent by Ayumi's father into the service of the Yoshikawa household, apparently to collect data. An effective maid, she is taciturn and quite able to cause trouble and thwart Ayumi's attempts to seduce Haruo. Her seeming obliviousness to the present conceals a calculating cunning that rivals even Fuyuno's. It is later revealed that she is an artificially-created human. The sound of a cymbal solo - a short musical quotation from The Terminator - sounds whenever she goes into action.
Michiru Mamiya (魔宮 みちる, Mamiya Michiru)
Voiced by: Natsuko Kuwatani (Japanese); Monica Rial (English)
Ayumi's younger sister, who is determined to stop Ayumi from breaking her curse and become head of the Mamiya family in her place. She is aware that Haruo's powers extend far beyond the ability to break Ayumi's curse and she intends to use that power to take over the world. Michiru is unbelievably powerful and extremely malevolent. As seen when she abducts Haruo during the play, her powers surpass those of the other girls combined.
Tetsuko Hongō (本郷 哲子, Hongō Tetsuko)
Voiced by: Noriko Rikimaru (Japanese); Christine Auten (English)
Haruo's class teacher, who seems to always be nearby whenever something strange happens. She also always seems to know what is happening. It is later revealed that she is an artificially-created human immune to certain kinds of magic.
Melissa Maelstrom (メリッサ・メイルシュトローム, Merissa Meirushutorōmu)
Voiced by: Ui Miyazaki
A manga-only character. Melissa is the 10-year-old head of the Maelstrom family, a group of Necromancers. Because of a curse of infertility, they are going extinct. She believes that if she has children with Haruo, the curse will be broken so she kidnaps him. When that fails, she decides to move next door.

== Media ==
=== Manga ===
The manga was serialized in Kodansha's Monthly Magazine Z from April 2003 to May 2008, and was collected into 10 tankōbon volumes.

==== List of volumes ====
No.	Japanese release date	Japanese ISBN
1	August 22, 2003	978-4-06-349140-1
2	August 23, 2004	978-4-06-349163-0
3	August 23, 2004	978-4-06-349181-4
4	July 22, 2005	978-4-06-349213-2
5	December 22, 2005	978-4-06-349226-2
6	April 21, 2006	978-4-06-349239-2
7	April 23, 2007	978-4-06-349276-7
8	September 21, 2007	978-4-06-349310-8
9	December 21, 2007	978-4-06-349321-4
10	May 23, 2008	978-4-06-349346-7

=== Anime ===
==== Episodes list ====
No.	Title	Original release date
1	"Magi? She is a Witch?" "Kanojo ga majotte, maji desuka?" (彼女が魔女って、マジですか?)	January 3, 2006
Haruo Yoshikawa sees Ayumi Mamiya in the streets, believing her to be a ghost when she mysteriously disappears amid the cherry blossoms. He later tells his sisters Maika Yoshikawa, Chiaki Yoshikawa and Fuyuno Yoshikawa about his strange encounter. The next day at school, Haruo, along with his classmates Hajime Hario and Sora Fujiwara, are surprised when teacher Tetsuko Hongō introduces Ayumi as a transfer student. During lunchtime, Ayumi is bullied by two delinquents, encouraging Haruo to fight back before passing out. However, Ayumi is forced to retaliate by revealing herself as a witch in front of Haruo's sisters. Although Haruo soon believes that he was the one who dealt with the delinquents, he goes home and find Ayumi asleep on his couch. Ayumi wakes up and announces that she will be a maid for the Yoshikawa family. She uses her position in order to seduce Haruo through a sleeping magic potion. Haruo's sisters later discover the truth behind Ayumi's curse originally caused by a magic mirror, in which Haruo is the only person who can break the curse. After Haruo's sisters overcome Ayumi's magic spells, Ayumi is allowed to stay with the Yoshikawa family for the time being.
2	"Magi? The Student Council President is Also a Witch?" "Seitokaichou mo majotte, maji desuka?" (生徒会長も魔女ってマジですか?)	January 10, 2006
Student council president Yuri Kurosu is displeased by the growing demoralization of the boys in the school caused by Hajime and Sora due to the overwhelming idolization of Ayumi. Attempting to improve the situation, Hajime and Sora encourages Yuri to become an even more outgoing role model to the students in hopes of competing with Ayumi and eventually deflating the unnecessary idolization. This leads to Yuri having a makeover in preparation for a fashion competition against Ayumi, though this escalates into a county fair. With neither of them wanting to lose, they each begin using magic to change outfits several times, encouraging a huge riot between their respective fans. In the aftermath, Haruo tells Yuri that he got to see a completely different side of her, which was pretty cool of her. As Ayumi claims victory by default and goes home with the Yoshikawa family, Yuri wonders if Haruo will call her cute as well.
3	"Magi? The Dangerous Siblings?" "Kiken na kyodaitte maji desuka?" (危険な兄妹ってマジですか?)	January 17, 2006
At night, a portal appears into Haruo's bizarre dream world, prompting Haruo's sisters as well as Yuri to investigate. They soon find out that Ayumi used her magic to create the portal in an attempt to make Haruo more manly. When Haruo begins to wake up, the girls combine their magic in order to leave the dream world and prevent themselves from being trapped. In the morning, Ayumi concludes that the reason Haruo cannot awaken his magic powers is because Maika spoils him to death. Chiaki mentions to Ayumi, Fuyuno and Yuri that Maika used to hate Haruo in the past. In order to find out what happened, Ayumi uses time highway magic to bring Chiaki, Fuyuno and Yuri deep into the past. They first see Haruo and Maika happily walking to school together. After seeing a glimpse of Maika brainwashing Haruo in his sleep, the four witness Haruo and Maika as children rehearsing for the play "Hansel and Gretel", first mistaken as an argument. Although she is still not convinced, Ayumi tries to keep digging further into the past, only to see that Maika as a baby stopped crying when Haruo held her hand.
4	"Magi? It's Stolen?" "Musumaretatte maji desuka?" (盗まれたってマジですか?)	January 24, 2006
Ayumi, Maika, Chiaki and Fuyuno bathe together in their hot spring outside the house, but someone peeps on them and steals their underwear before Haruo takes notice. While Ayumi is gravely upset that she lost an "important item", Haruo and his sisters discuss that it must have been a keepsake of her parents. Enlisting the help of Yuri, Haruo takes her advice on crime prevention, more or less luring the thief back to the house. When this fails, Hajime and Sora sudden arrive and prepare some propaganda for Haruo's sisters and Yuri, though this quickly backfires. Ayumi, Maika, Chiaki, Fuyuno and Yuri bathe together in the hot spring, while Haruo keep watch. When a group of photographers corner the house and capture Haruo, Ayumi uses her magic to deceive the photographers and temporarily turn them into toads before they are arrested by the police. Despite none of the photographers being the true culprit, Haruo's sisters find out that Ayumi kept a locket containing a picture of Haruo in her pocket the whole time. Elsewhere, an unknown girl is revealed to have possession of Ayumi's underwear.
5	"Magi? A Witch Hunter?" "Uicchi Hantaa tte maji desuka?" (ウィッチハンターってマジですか?)	January 31, 2006
The unknown girl is revealed to be a Catholic witch hunter named Marin Nijihara. She tries to attack Ayumi in broad daylight, but Haruo shows up in the middle of the fight, prompting Ayumi to take him home and ignore Marin in the process. During dinner, Ayumi tells Haruo's sisters about her encounter with Marin. The next day, Marin shows up as a student at school, yet loses to Ayumi in a fight. Determined to find out Ayumi's weak point, Marin asks Haruo and his sisters about Ayumi's dislikes. After Marin takes constant measures of exploiting Ayumi's dislikes, Ayumi fights Marin after school until Haruo shows up unexpectedly. Ayumi accidentally blasts magic at him, but it deflects back due to Maika's magic reflection spell, though Marin thinks Haruo is a simpleton that needs protection. The following day, Ayumi, Maika, Yuri and Marin each prepare a boxed lunch laced with magic and compete to give theirs to Haruo first. They resolve the argument by sampling each other's boxed lunches, only to turn into children. Marin finally gives Haruo a sample of her boxed lunch, and the girls become normal after drinking Marin's magic tea.
6	"Magi? There's a Ghost?" "Yuurei ga detatte maji desuka?" (幽霊が出たってマジですか?)	February 7, 2006
During summer vacation, Haruo tries to tell Ayumi a ghost story in order to hinder her from teaching him how to swim at the public swimming pool, though his efforts are in vain. After drawing too much attention from spectating boys, Ayumi takes Haruo to a private swimming pool nearby, where Hajime and Sora suspect it to be haunted. Ayumi is consequently attacked by the pool of water, prompting Yuri and Marin to save her. However, Haruo is turned into ectoplasm before Maika, Chiaki and Fuyuno also arrive. The girls team up to return Haruo back to normal, as it is confirmed by Hajime and Sora that the private swimming pool is haunted by a ghost. After Hajime and Sora conjure up the ghost, she tells the story of how she was always hospitalized and wanted to play outside in the sun wearing the swimswit of her dreams. The girls don their bikinis in an attempt to distract the ghost. Luckily, Fuyuno uses her magic to change the bikinis into one-piece swimsuits, giving the girls an opportunity to turn the ghost into a doll and return Haruo back to normal.
7	"Magi? A Maid is Here?" "Maid ga kitatte maji desuka?" (メイドが来たってマジですか?)	February 15, 2006
At their house, Haruo and his sisters encounter a stranger wearing a hazmat suit armed with a magic air gun. When Haruo's sisters determine that the stranger has come to assassinate Ayumi, the stranger takes off her hazmat suit and temporarily incapacitates Haruo on a bed, making Maika furious. Ayumi then arrives home, finding out that the stranger placed various traps around the house in order to exterminate rats. The stranger introduces herself as Rika Anju, a maid who has come to support Ayumi. Haruo later passes out and is taken to a magic hospital, where it is revealed that he has an incurable magical fever due to his sisters repeatedly using a magic memory-erasing hammer, yet he appears to be just fine. Ayumi and Rika begin to compete in a "maid battle" to win over Haruo. After Haruo inadvertently chooses Ayumi over Rika, both Yuri and Marin barge in just when the spirit of fire named Haidenei has awakened after being sealed in the magic hospital long ago. As soon as Ayumi, Yuri and Marin all guard Haruo from being attacked by Haidenei, Rika reveals this to be a prank for her to collect personal data.
8	"Magi? A Victory Kiss?" "Shouri no kisutte maji desuka?" (勝利のキスってマジですか?)	February 21, 2006
Ayumi is given a magic book by Rika which would turn everything transcribed into reality. With her desire to become the MVP at the school's sports festival and be kissed by Haruo, Ayumi is halted by Haruo's sisters, Yuri and Marin before activating the magic book. Due to their quarrel, all the words in the book become mixed up and state that the girl who becomes this year's MVP receives a kiss from Haruo. Ayumi, Maika, Yuri and Marin agree to compete against each other in order to become the MVP. After Chiaki informs that the girls-only ultra race is the event that gives the most points, Ayumi, Maika, Yuri and Marin rush to register. Ayumi's younger sister Michiru Mamiya remotely plants a magic bug inside the principal's brain via the magic book, which causes him to change the game rules and make all runners compete in pairs. After Michiru sets many sports-themed obstacles around the schoolyard, Ayumi wins the girls-only ultra race. However, Chiaki is the one who becomes the MVP due to winning all the eating contests. It is a major shock when Haruo kisses Chiaki in front of the entire school.
9	"Magi? He's a Sleeping Prince?" "Nemureru oujitte maji desuka?" (眠れる王子ってマジですか?)	February 28, 2006
At the school's cultural festival, Haruo, Ayumi, Maika, Chiaki, Fuyuno and Yuri perform in "Cinderella". During the scene where Haruo and Yuri first meet at the castle, Michiru suddenly intercepts and kidnaps Haruo through the magic mirror on stage. Ayumi, Maika, Yuri, Marin and Rika follow after them, while Chiaki and Fuyuno get left behind. As Ayumi, Maika, Yuri, Marin and Rika arrive outside Michiru's dark domain, they find out that Michiru has put Haruo into a deep sleep. The four girls are momentarily attacked by evil fairy tale characters. While it revealed that Hongō secretly went through the magic mirror as well, the four girls eventually defeat the evil fairy tale characters. The four girls then make their way inside the castle, only to be subdued by Michiru's magic-draining beanstalks. Haruo awakens his dormant magic powers and defeats Michiru. Time returns prior to the performance on stage and everyone seems to have forgotten what happened. In her castle, Michiru continues to vow her revenge.
10	"Magi? The Cat Panties are Cursed?" "Noroi no neko pantsutte maji desuka?" (呪いの猫パンツってマジですか?)	March 7, 2006
Ayumi momentarily panics over witnessing Haruo's sisters doing a better job of getting Haruo's attention. Because of this, Rika gives Ayumi a pair of magic cat panties which would triple her magic powers. Unfortunately, the cat panties are possessed by a perverted spirit, in which the only person who can take them off is Haruo. The next day at school, Ayumi persists on being alone with Haruo while evading the lust-driven boys due to the magic powers of the cat panties. Just when Ayumi figures out that the cat panties shrank in size, Yuri and Marin find her alone in the school gymnasium, but the cat panties force the two of them to desire Ayumi. Rika suddenly arrives to knock out Yuri and Marin, while Ayumi departs after being unable to unveil the cat panties to Haruo in the school storage room. It is revealed that Haruo previously broke his glasses and only wore frames to school. When Haruo arrives home, Ayumi confidently shows her strawberry panties to him, but he passes out and accidentally pull them off. However, Haruo's sisters coincidentally show up at the house at the same time.
11	"Magi? It's a Holy Night?" "Seinaru yorutte maji desuka?" (聖なる夜ってマジですか?)	March 14, 2006
With Christmas Eve coming up, Haruo seems to have something deep on his mind. Yuri, Marin and Maika each have their fantasies about spending the day with Haruo. Ayumi and Rika soon finds out that Haruo has been working part-time at a cake shop with a girl named Ran. After waiting for Haruo's work shift to finish, Ayumi becomes jealous after witnessing Haruo and Ran sharing an umbrella in the snow. A Christmas party is thrown at Haruo's house, in which Haruo, Maika, Chiaki, Fuyuno, Yuri, Marin and Rika all attend. However, Ayumi does not show up, prompting Haruo to leave and search for her. Meanwhile, Ayumi encounters Ran, who is out on a date with a boy named Shinichi. Ran reveals that Haruo asked her to go shopping with him in order to buy presents for everyone. Yuri gives Haruo's present to everyone, but there is no present for Ayumi when she arrives. Although she is upset over not getting a present, Ayumi is relieved when Haruo kept her present with him all this time, which just so happens to be a cat plushie.
12	"Magi? It's Time for Awakening?" "Mezame no tokitte maji desuka?" (目覚めの刻ってマジですか?)	March 21, 2006
On New Year's Day, Haruo passes out money gifts to Maika, Chiaki, Fuyuno and even Ayumi, before Yuri and Marin join them in eating delicacies. As the five of them head to the shrine, they encounter Hajime and Sora on the way. As a little girl loses her balloon, Haruo shows signs of awakening his magic powers, as he is able to retrieve the balloon the sky. Hongō and Michiru each watch from the shadows, believing that Haruo is the vessel of the demon king. After visiting the shrine, Ayumi is bent on breaking the curse as soon as possible, so she takes Haruo with her away from Maika, Chiaki, Fuyuno, Yuri and Marin. They stumble upon a funhouse, and they all decide to go inside. However, it turns out to be a trap set by Michiru disguised as a clown. As Michiru declares that Haruo will be hers, she takes him away and leaves the girls to fight against a horde of monsters. Rika arrives to save the other girls, but Michiru now has Haruo with her in the magical world.
13	"Magi? It's the Final Episode?" "Saishuukaitte maji desuka?" (最終回ってマジですか?)	March 28, 2006
When Ayumi was younger, she saw Haruo in the magic mirror for the first time and fell in love. Ayumi, Maika, Chiaki, Fuyuno, Yuri, Marin and Rika all travel to the castle in the magical world in order to battle Michiru and save Haruo. Meanwhile, Michiru extracts some magic powers from Haruo, giving her incredible abilities. During the battle, Michiru remains undefeated with her ice-cold attacks against the girls. Surprisingly, Haruo awakens his magic powers and takes over the entire castle, though Hongō appears and teleports the girls and herself away from the demonic energy. Hongō states that Haruo is indeed the vessel of the demon king, but they must reverse time in order to seal the demon king. Revealing herself as a cyborg who has been witnessing a one-year time loop, Hongō tries to reverse time, but she is unable to do this since there has been some changes in Haruo's emotions. With the help of all the girls especially Ayumi, they are able to reverse time due to their love towards Haruo. The episode ends with Haruo chancing upon Ayumi in the streets under the cherry blossoms again.

== Reception ==
The reception of Magikano varies greatly. Reviews from viewers comment on the anime's fun nature and good use of humour. The use of inappropriate language without censorship and slap-stick humour was well-received by Magikano's audience. However, many viewers also held negative reviews and brought attention to the cliché romantic plot. Others who held the same opinion also commented on the pointless ending, where many fans felt that the series of events used in the conclusion of the story did not match the general overtone exhibited throughout the majority of the anime series.

Anime reviewers such as the Anime News Network and Mania stated that Magikano has potential. However, Anime News Network joined viewers who disliked the anime, commenting that "it seems devoid of any ambition at all". This same network criticized the ending as "pointless and stupid" reflecting on the abrupt conclusion that changes in tone suddenly.

Still, anime reviewers such as activeAnime praise the Magikano series and observe the "racy girls with magical means with more comedy and twists that harem fans can imagine!" (Ellingwood, Holly).
