= Miami Guns =

Japanese manga series

マイアミ☆ガンズ (Maiami Ganzu)
- Genre: Comedy, girls with guns, parody
- Manga
- Written by: Takeaki Momose
- Published by: Kodansha
- Magazine: Magazine Special
- Original run: 1997 – 1999
- Volumes: 4
- Anime television series
- Directed by: Yoshitaka Koyama
- Written by: Yutaka Hirata
- Music by: Kou Nakagawa
- Studio: Group TAC
- Licensed by: NA: AN Entertainment
- Original network: TBS
- Original run: 5 February 2000 – 20 May 2000
- Episodes: 13

Miami Guns (Japanese: マイアミ☆ガンズ, Hepburn: Maiami Ganzu) is a Japanese manga series written and illustrated by Takeaki Momose. The story takes place in Miami City, which is similar to Miami, Florida, except for several locale changes. It's mainly about the life of two female Miami City police officers having to stop crimes before they get worse. The setting thus has some similarities to that of the popular TV show Miami Vice.

== Characters ==
Yao Sakurakouji (桜小路 妖, Sakurakōji Yao)
Voiced by: Megumi Toyoguchi (Japanese); Nicole Gibson (English)
Yao is the daughter of one of the richest people in Miami City and seems to ask for her money a lot. She is part of the Miami City Police and sometimes is unaware of what danger she's in. She has a love for senseless violence, not to mention a desire to be the center of attention to whatever her whim is. To her, being on the police is just an excuse to shoot people and blow buildings up. She just doesn't care about anyone else... except herself and her partner Lu.
Lu Amano (天野 ルウ, Amano Rū)
Voiced by: Yukari Tamura (Japanese); Suzanne Willard (English)
She is part of the Miami City Police and is a lot more calm and aware of things than her partner, Yao. She seems to always be on top of things. Her father is the Chief of the Miami Police. One of her hobbies is wealth management, and sometimes whenever Yao's dad would cut her off, Lu would lend Yao money... but at a high rate of interest. But otherwise, Lu cares about Yao a lot, and although she doesn't show it, often worries about her.
Kaken Masume (科研娘, Kaken Masume)
Voiced by: Rie Tanaka (Japanese); Mary Evans (English)
Kaken Masume is a scientist and part of the Miami City Police, but doesn't usually go on missions. She does come with Yao and Lu in episodes like "The Sea! Bikinis! Ghosts!" and "Princess Nokemono". Her clothes features a dart gun in her bow tie, helpful for subduing distraught bystanders... or when used by Yao, to knock out the chief so that she could do her grandstanding.
Chief Amano (署長)
Voiced by: Mitsuru Ogata (Japanese); Charles Dee Rice (English)
He's the Chief of the Miami City Police and is the father of Lu. He's a bit tight with money, especially when payday comes at the department. He also gets a lot of flak about his dated afro hairdo, and would like nothing more than to get rid of Yao.
Nagisa Tojo (東條 ナギサ, Tōjō Nagisa)
Voiced by: Chiaki Osawa (Japanese); Crystal Waters (English)
Believed to be a major player in "the Organization", Nagisa Tojo has been awarded many honors in the past until Yao ruined one of her hugest plans yet. She now plans to take revenge on Yao, but Yao believes her to be her greatest friend and sometimes Nagisa takes advantage of this to find a way to get rid of Yao.
Julio Peacemaker (ウォーターメロンマン フリオ, Furio)
Voiced by: Akira Ishida (Japanese); Bill Munoz (English)
A freelance bounty hunter. He refers to himself as a "Messenger of Peace" and travels around with his pet alligator Al. He runs into Yao and Lu in several episodes of the 13-episode series. He seems to sometimes get into Yao's personal space, but she usually treats him as some sort of gigolo.
Al (アル, Aru)
Voiced by: Yukari Tamura (Japanese); Nozomi Shikauchi (English)
Julio Peacemaker's pint-sized pet alligator. Originally, Al was a test subject in the Tojo Conglomerate's animal-testing labs until he escaped. As a result of the experiments, Al possesses human-level intelligence, for which he uses to help out Julio. He is also very fascinated with panties.
Jii (ジ イ)
Voiced by: Tomomichi Nishimura (Japanese); Ralph Redpath (English)
Jii is Yao's assigned bodyguard. Not much is known about this man: his birthday, country of origin... even his real name. But whatever, he is a loyal servant to the Sakurakougi family, also serving as a butler, mechanic, even a mercenary. He also has a side-job as a professional wrestling trainer.
George and Anthony
Voiced by: Hiroyuki Yokoo (Japanese); Frank Marshall (English) (George)
Voiced by: Hiroki Takahashi (Japanese); Josh Batenhorst (English) (Anthony)
They're two gay lovers/commandos who seems to pop up in episodes including "The Sea! Bikinis! Ghosts!" and "Spy! Miami Girls School". It is rumored that they are major players in "the Organization". However, they seem to be more interested in each other than in what vague plans that are in store.
Kosuke, Haruki, and Taruko
Voiced by: Hiroki Takahashi (Japanese); Jess Wells (English) (Kosuke)
Voiced by: Norihisa Mori (Japanese); James Morasso (English) (Haruki)
Voiced by: Masaya Takatsuka (Japanese); R.K. Roberson (English) (Takuro)
These three are officers of the Miami Police and seem to get into trouble sometimes.
Mr. Sakurakouji (妖の父, Yao no Chichi)
Voiced by: Shingo Horii (Japanese); Scott Bailey (English)
He is the mysterious father of Yao and doesn't want her to be in the Miami City Police. He'll become angry at Yao from time to time, usually either because of her money problems or because the city is being destroyed because of something she did. He would like to see her off the Miami City Police, but realizes it just get her out of his hair.

== Anime episodes ==
#	English title	Japanese title	Original airdate
1	The Miami Bank Robbery	Maiami Ginkou Shuugeki Jiken	2000-02-05
2	All About the Miami Guns!	Kore ga Miami☆Guns no Subete da!	2000-02-12
3	Spy! Miami Girls School	Sennyuu! Maiami Jo Gakuen	2000-02-19
4	Miami Mountain Pass GO GO GO!	Maiami Touge GO GO GO!	2000-02-26
5	The Gunman With A Little Alligator	Kowani wo Tsureta Wataridori	2000-03-04
6	Watermelon Bomb!	Suika de BOM!	2000-03-11
7	Princess Nokemono	Nokemono Hime	2000-03-18
8	The Sea! Bikinis! Ghosts!	Umi da! Mizugi da! Yuurei da!	2000-04-08
9	Ten Million Miami Dollar Woman	1000 Man Miami Dollar no Onna	2000-04-15
10	Zenigeba Deka R	Zenigeba Deka R	2000-04-22
11	Burning Plan of Revenge	Honoo no Fukushuu Keikaku	2000-04-29
12	Shameless Guerrilla	Harenchi Guerrilla	2000-05-13
13	Goodbye, Miami Guns!?	Saraba Miami Guns!?	2000-05-20

== Theme songs ==
Opening
"SEEDS" by Lastier
Ending
奇蹟の城 (Kiseki no Shiro, Castles of Miracles) by epidemic
