= Satomi Ikezawa =

Japanese manga artist

- Born: March 18, 1962 (age 64); Sumida, Tokyo, Japan
- Occupation: Manga artist

Satomi Ikezawa (池沢理美, Ikezawa Satomi) is a Japanese manga artist. Her works include Guru Guru Pon-chan, Othello and Sue-chan wa Himitsu. In 2000, she received the Kodansha Manga Award in the shōjo category for Guru Guru Pon-chan.

== Works ==
- Anatomy of a Seventeen-Year-Old
- Kattobi New Yorker
- The Devil and Pure Love
- A Girl's Enemy Is Girls
- I'm in Trouble Because I've Seen Too Much
- Fed Up with Adolescence!
- The No-No's of Love and Adolescence
- Are You Obsessed?
- Angel's Pheromone
- Othello
- Guru Guru Pon-chan
- Guru Guru Pon-chan: Okawari
