= Monthly Magazine Z =

Japanese manga magazine

- Cover of the March 2009 issue of Monthly Magazine Z, published by Kodansha on January 26, 2009
- Categories: Seinen manga
- Frequency: Monthly
- First issue: June 26, 1999
- Final issue: January 26, 2009
- Company: Kodansha
- Country: Japan
- Based in: Tokyo
- Language: Japanese
- Website: Official site

Monthly Magazine Z (Japanese: 月刊マガジンZ, Hepburn: Gekkan Magajin Zetto) was a Japanese seinen mixed-media magazine published by Kodansha, aimed at adult men, but particularly at hardcore anime and manga fans, featuring articles as well as manga tied into popular franchises. Original manga were also featured in the magazine.

It was announced in September 2008 that Magazine Z would be discontinued. The last issue shipped on January 26, 2009.

== Manga artists and series serialized in Magazine Z ==
Hideaki Nishikawa

- Apocrypha Getter Robot Dash (2008–2009)

Yuu Watase

- Sakura Taisen (2005–2009) (manga commissioned by Sega Enterprises)

Kia Asamiya

- Batman: Child of Dreams (2000–2001) (manga commissioned by DC Comics)

Hoshi Itsuki

- Kurau Phantom Memory (2005)
- Skies of Arcadia (2000–2002)

Baku Yumemakura/Sei Itoh

- Kouya ni Kemono Doukokusu (2004–2009)

Momotarō Miyano/Masamune Shirow

- RD Sennou Chousashitsu (2008–2009)

Takuya Fujima

- Deus Vitae (1999–2002)
- Free Collars Kingdom (2002–2003)

Q Hayashida

- Maken X Another (1999–2001)

Nishikawa Shinji

- Chouseishin Gransazer (2003–2004)

Toshitsugu Iida

- Wolf's Rain (2003–2004) (created by Keiko Nobumoto)

Shinya Kaneko

- Culdcept (1999–2007)

Yōsuke Kuroda/Ichiro Inui

- Bujingai: Zanou Densetsu (2004–2005)

Takahiro Seguchi

- Ai wa Kagerou (2004–2006)

Itoh Shi

- Puppet Revolution (2002)

Katsu Aki

- Psychic Academy (1999–2003)

Asuka Katsura

- Le Portrait de Petit Cossette (2004)

Yuuichi Kumakura

- King of Bandit Jing (1999–2005)

Asato Mifune

- Yukei Seikyo Kukla (story by Koji Tazawa)

Satoru Akahori/Ryuusei Deguchi

- Magical Shopping Arcade Abenobashi (2001–2002)

Yuuna Takanagi/Tooru Zekuu

- Shikigami no Shiro (2003–2004)
- Shikigami no Shiro: Nejireta Shiro-hen (2004–2008)

Nozomu Tamaki

- Hakodate Youjin Buraichou Himegami (2007–2009)

Haruhiko Mikimoto

- Baby Birth (2001–2002) (story by Sukehiro Tomita)

Kenichi Muraeda

- Kamen Rider Spirits (2001–2009) (story and concept by Shotaro Ishinomori)

Yuushi Kanoe

- Ayakashi (2007–2008)

Sasaki Yoshioka

- Placebo

Ran Satomi/Maki Ebishi

- Doll Star: Kotodama Tsukai Ihon (2008–2009)

Sung-gyu Lee/Kyoichi Nanatsuki

- Void (2010)

Auto Taguchi

- Mobile Suit Gundam 00
- Mobile Suit Gundam 00 Second Season

Chiaki Ogishima

- Heat Guy J (2003) (created by Kazuki Akane)

Aikawa Shou/Jinguuji Hajime

- Karakuri Kiden: Hiwou Senki (1999–2001)

Atsushi Soga

- Turn A Gundam (1999–2002) (story by Yoshiyuki Tomino)

Junji Ito

- Junji Ito's Cat Diary: Yon & Mu (2008–2009)

Mimi Natto/Tokumo Sora

- Ism/i (2007–2009)

Hajime Ueda

- FLCL (2000–2001)
- Q·Ko-chan: The Earth Invader Girl (2003–2004)

Yatate Hajime/Yoshiyuki Tomino/Masatsugu Iwase

- Mobile Suit Gundam SEED (2002–2004)
- Mobile Suit Gundam SEED Destiny (2004–2006)

Warabino Kugeko

- Heroic Age (2007–2008)

Yoshihiko Tomizawa/Hiroyuki Kaidō

- Kikinosuke Gomen (2006–2007)

Go Nagai

- Amon: The Darkside of the Devilman (1999–2004) (art by Yu Kinutani)
- Demon Lord Dante (2003–2004)
- Devilman Mokushiroku: Strange Days (2005)
- Kikoushi Enma (2006)
- Mazinger Angels (2004–2006)
- Mazinger Angel Z (2007–2008)
- Satanikus Enma Kerberos (2007–2009)

Satoshi Urushihara

- Vampire Master Dark Crimson (2000)

You Higuri/George Iida

- Night Head Genesis (2006–2008)

Takashige Hiroshi/Soga Atsushi

- Midori no Ou (2003–2009)

Tohiro Konno

- Pugyuru (2001–2009)

Narumi Kakinouchi

- Yakushiji Ryōko no Kaiki Jikenbo (2004–2009) (story by Yoshiki Tanaka)

Tomo Umino

- Aoi Sora no Neosphere (2005–2006)

Yuu Kinutaki/Mimi Natto

- The Tales from the Far East (2006–2007)

Momotarou Miyano

- RD Senno Chosashitsu (2008–2009)

Eishi Ozeki

- Sky Girls (2007)

Kyoichi Nanatsuki/Takayuki Takashi

- 8 Man Infinity (2005–2007)

Masato Hisa

- Jabberwocky (2006–2009)

Kakinouchi Narumi/Hirano Toshiki

- Fuun Sanshimai Lin^{3} (1999–2001)
- Shaolin Sisters: Reborn (2001–2003)

Katsuhiro Otomo/Yuu Kinutani

- Steamboy (2005–2006)

Ogishima Chiaki

- The Legend of Mikazuchi (1999–2002)

Takeaki Momose

- Magikano (2003–2008)

Hitoshi Ariga

- The Big O (1999–2001)
- Mimimi ~The Tale of a Cat and a Robot~ (2002)

Kaihou Norimitsu/Ishiwatari Daisuke

- Guilty Gear Xtra (2002–2003)

Masato Hisa

- Grateful Dead (2003–2004)

Yūjiro Izumi

- Popotan (2003–2004)

Takumi Kobayashi/Masahiro Sonoda

- Afureko (2007–2008)

Tow Ubukata/Kiriko Yumeji

- Le Chevalier D'Eon (2005–2008)

Hikaru Nikaidou

- Atomic Nekokabutsu (2005–2007)

Kenji Ishikawa/Kouji Tazawa

- Metroid (2002–2004) (manga commissioned by Nintendo)

Yoshitomo Akihito

- Companion (2006–2008)

Unknown authors;

- Kitty Kitty Fancia (1999–2001)
- Wild Arms Flower Thieves (1999–2001)
