= Free Collars Kingdom =

Japanese manga series by Fujima Takuya

- Front cover of Volume 1

フリーカラーズキングダム (Furī Karāzu Kingudamu)
- Genre: Fantasy, Comedy
- Manga
- Written by: Fujima Takuya
- Published by: Kodansha (original); Ichijinsha (reprint)
- English publisher: NA: Del Rey; UK: Tanoshimi
- Magazine: Magazine Z
- Original run: 2002 – 2004
- Volumes: 3 (Kodansha); 2 (Ichijinsha)

Free Collars Kingdom (フリーカラーズキングダム, Furī Karāzu Kingudamu) is a Japanese manga series written and illustrated by Fujima Takuya. The individual chapters were serialized in Magazine Z, and compiled into three tankōbon volumes released by Kodansha from February 2003 to March 2004. Set in Ikebukuro, Japan, the series revolves around the struggle of two stray cat groups. Cyan, a young newly abandoned cat, joins one of them, the Free Collars. Each cat has two appearances; to humans, they appear as normal cats, but to other cats, they appear as catboys and catgirls. Each cat has their own attack, and some carry weapons.

While drawing the series, Fujima changed his art style from one used previously, though he was asked to use his original styling. He also noted that the series was different from his other works, and was unsure of how the audience would respond to it. Free Collars Kingdom is licensed for English language release in the United States by Del Rey, which released the series in 2007, and in the United Kingdom by Tanoshimi, which released it in 2008. It was licensed for regional release by Tong Li Publishing in Taiwan, Jonesky in Hong Kong, and Star Comics in Italy. Free Collars Kingdom garnered mixed reviews from critics. The series was praised for its artwork and humor, but criticized for its plot and characters.

== Plot ==
Cyan is a young Abyssinian cat who lives with a boy named Kokoro and his parents in Ikebukuro. When Kokoro becomes sick, his parents abandon Cyan, leaving him in the basement of their apartment complex. Soon he discovers a group of stray cats called the "Free Collars", who control East Ikebukuro and believe that collars hold down cats' "Wild Spirit". Cyan is given the opportunity to join, provided that he removes his collar, the symbol that he is still Kokoro's pet. Cyan declines, opting to remain in the basement and await Kokoro's return. However, Cyan comes to realize that he must join the Free Collars if he hopes to survive and reunite with Kokoro. He removes his collar and joins them in their fight against Siam, a rival gang leader who wants control of East Ikebukuro and plans to rule the world and enslave humans.

In his ensuing adventures, Cyan grows close to the Free Collars, yet still longs for Kokoro. He becomes frustrated by Siam's continued advances on East Ikebukuro and his teammates' unwillingness to mount an offensive attack. Convinced that Siam must be destroyed, Cyan confronts her and learns she was once a Free Collar until her brother, Puriam, was chased onto a road by humans and killed by a bus. Cyan is able to defeat her, and, reminded of Puriam, Siam silently wishes him farewell. Soon after, Cyan learns that Kokoro had recovered but is moving away. Saddened by the thought of leaving the Free Collars, he meets Kokoro at the train station and gives him his torn collar as a memento. Kokoro promises to visit Cyan, and Cyan returns to his new friends.

=== Characters ===
The Free Collars are a group a stray cats who have removed their collars and refuse to have any relationship with humans. Cyan is a young Abyssinian who joins the Free Collars after being abandoned. He tends to be childlike, which sometimes irritates other members of the group. Scottie is a Scottish Fold who spends much of her time with the Free Collars but is not a member. She was discovered by Amesho, an old American Shorthair and leader of the Free Collars, in a bookstore. Char is a Chartreux and was once part of the "Cat House Kingdom", a household of high-class cats, but left, feeling she was being used by humans. Rat is a Korat and the most talented with gadgets and technology within the group. Coon is an easily angered Maine Coon who specializes in swimming. Minky is a Tonkinese who befriends Cyan and Scottie and is named after her mink-like fur.

On the opposing side is Siam, a Siamese cat who controls all of West Ikebukuro and is the leader of the Siam Army. Siam's principal henchman and general of the Siam Army is Kline, who has a distinct hatred for humans and sees them only as her potential slaves. Acting as Siam's bodyguards are A-Ko and I-Ko, two Manx cats. Having been previously discriminated against for their lack of tails, A-Ko and I-Ko pretended to have tails, fearing rejection from Siam.

== Production ==
Fujima had originally been asked to draw Free Collars Kingdom in a style he had used previously on other works. However, his drawing style evolved during the development of Free Collars Kingdom.

In the first volume of Free Collars Kingdom, Fujima expressed his feelings on the series' release, while also stating that "it went to the press before I knew it". Fujima noted that the series was "quite a bit different" compared to previous series he had worked on, and that he "had no idea how" the audience would respond to it. He explained that "if you have fun reading it, then I'll be happy". In volume two, due to having left-over "open pages", Fujima used the extra pages to "describe characters" and "have fun".

== Media ==
Written and illustrated by Fujima Takuya, the individual chapters of Free Collars Kingdom were first serialized in Japan in Magazine Z from 2002 to 2004. Those chapters were collected and published in three tankōbon volumes by Kodansha, with the first released on February 21, 2003, and the last on March 23, 2004. On July 27, 2010, the company Ichijinsha released a reprint of the series in two collected volumes.

The series is licensed for English language release in North America by Del Rey, which published the series from January 30, 2007, to July 31, 2007. In the United Kingdom, it was published by Tanoshimi from February 1, 2007, to August 2, 2008. It is also licensed for regional language releases in Taiwan by Tong Li Publishing, in Italy by Star Comics, and Hong Kong by Jonesky.

=== Volume list ===
No.	Original release date	Original ISBN	North America release date	North America ISBN
1	February 21, 2003	978-4-06-349119-7	January 30, 2007	978-0-345-49265-4
Cat Tale 1: Those Who Wear Free Collars; Cat Tale 2: Her and the Old Guy's Situation; Cat Tale 3: Nyan-Man Love; Cat Tale 4: Meow of the Heart; Cat Tale 5: O Holy Night's Caterwaul
2	September 22, 2003	978-4-06-349147-0	May 1, 2007	978-0-345-49266-1
Cat Tale 6: Cat Ear Report; Cat Tale 7: Ikebukuro Driven; Cat Tale 8: Siamese Cat Boogie; Cat Tale 9: Nice, Guy; Cat Tale 10: Round & Round, Fate Goes Around; Cat Tale 11: An Injection for a Certain Special Someone; Cat Tale 12: Collar of Love
3	March 23, 2004	978-4-06-349171-5	July 31, 2007	978-0-345-49267-8
Cat Tale 13: Cyan's Rage; Cat Tale 14: BehaviorXRehabilitation; Cat Tale 15: The Place One Must Be; Cat Tale 16: Siam's Collar; Cat Tale 17: The Return of the Queen; Cat Tale 18: A Stray Cat's Heaven

== Reception ==
Free Collars Kingdom received mixed reviews from English-speaking audiences. Matthew Alexander of Mania praised the artwork, noting that characters were "cute and sexy with a wide variety of clothing that does a good job expressing the character's personality" and that, overall, the artwork was "very clean with attractive characters and well-detailed backgrounds". In his review of the second volume, Alexander wrote that "so far, the story continues to be a fun examination of what life might be like from the cat's point of view, but I don't know how the whole Wild Cat storyline is going to be wrapped up in only one more volume". In his review of the third volume, Alexander felt that "the story probably received an early ending", but concluded that "despite the series only being three volumes, it really is a worthy read and quite funny if you've ever owned a cat".

In reviewing the second volume, Manga Life's Dan Polley felt "Fujima [did] a very good job of laying down the framework and executing a plot for fun and carefree adventures." In his review of the third volume, Polley wrote that "the art is enjoyable, but can sometimes be overloaded" and that "often there are sequences in which there is too much going on and it is hard to decipher exactly what the eyes are seeing." However, he noted that "fans of the series will continue to enjoy the animalistic cheekiness."

Writing for School Library Journal, Benjamin Russell criticized the series for being "slow and formulaic" with "similarly formulaic" character designs that made "it seem staid". He also stated that the "animal world" portrayed could be fun and that it was "interesting to see humanoid characters so tiny next to artifacts of human culture", but it failed to hold the reader's interest. Casey Brienza of Anime News Network heavily criticized the story, grading it as an "F" and calling it "a pastiche of a large number of manga and anime clichés, not because it seems like it was intended to be a pastiche, but because the manga artist [Fujima] flatly is unable to sustain a coherent, unified storyline that is his own, original creation." However, Brienza did praise the artwork, grading it as an "A" and calling it rich and "beautifully drawn". In Manga: The Complete Guide, Jason Thompson notes that the series' "hook" is that characters are all "drawn as hot anthropomorphic cat-girls and cat-boys" and praises it for having a "unique twist".
