= Tsugumi Higasayama =

Japanese voice actress

Tsugumi Higasayama (日笠山亜美, Higasayama Tsugumi, born March 21, 1978) is a Japanese voice actress from Saitama, Japan. Her name is sometimes misread as Ami Higasayama.

== Filmography ==
- Aquarion as Tsugumi Rosenmeier
- Best Student Council as Miiko Mikawa (eps 1,2)
- Boogiepop Phantom as Megumi Toyama
- Futakoi as Boy (ep 5)
- Genshiken as ComiFes staff (ep 10); Female registerer (ep 2); Female student council member (ep 11); Okada (ep 9); Saleswoman (ep 1); Waitress (ep 7)
- Haibane Renmei as Child; Haibane of Abandoned Factory
- Jyu Oh Sei as Girl (ep 2)
- NieA 7 as Waitress
- Otogi Zoshi as Village girl (ep 2)
- Pani Poni Dash! as Otome Akiyama
- Project Blue Earth SOS as Margaret
- Psychic Academy as Myuu
- Tactical Roar as Sakura Sasahara
- To Heart - Remember my memories as Child A (ep 3)
