= Hajime Ueda =

Japanese manga artist

Hajime Ueda ウエダ ハジメ
- Areas: Manga artist, animator

Hajime Ueda (ウエダ ハジメ, Ueda Hajime) is a Japanese manga artist who created a two-volume adaptation of the Japanese animated OVA series FLCL, and the original manga Q·Ko-chan: The Earth Invader Girl. He started his career as a dōjinshi artist, gaining a reputation for his quirky and unique style of art. He also does some costume design and sculpting. Ueda is also an artist known for his works with studios Shaft and Khara, particularly on the Monogatari series in which he's acted as an opening and ending animator for various installments of the franchise; and on the works of director Kazuya Tsurumaki.

== Works ==
=== Manga ===
Year	Title	Publisher	Role(s)	Ref(s)
1999	FLCL	Magazine Z (Kodansha)	Author and illustrator	
2003	Q-Ko-Chan: The Earth Invader Girl	Magazine Z (Kodansha)	Author and illustrator	
2009	Jagdtiger	Faust (Del Rey)	Illustrator (written by Kouhei Kadono)	

=== Anime ===
Year	Type	Title	Director(s)	Studio	Role	Ref(s)
2004	OVA	Diebuster	Kazuya Tsurumaki	Gainax	Design assistance (#1, 4–6)	
2004	TV	Uta Kata	Keiji Gotoh	Hal Film Maker	Costume transformation (#3); Ending illustration (#3)	
2006	Movie	Gunbuster vs. Diebuster	Hideaki Anno; Kazuya Tsurumaki	Gainax	Design assistance	
2009	TV	Bakemonogatari	Akiyuki Shinbo; Tatsuya Oishi	Shaft	Ending animation Back sponsor screen illustration (#12)	
2009	TV	Natsu no Arashi! Akinai-chuu	Akiyuki Shinbo; Kenichi Ishikura	Shaft	End card illustration (#10)	
2011	TV	Puella Magi Madoka Magica	Akiyuki Shinbo; Yukihiro Miyamoto	Shaft	End card illustration (#6)	
2012	TV	Nisemonogatari	Akiyuki Shinbo; Tomoyuki Itamura	Shaft	Ending animation Hitagi's flashback scene (#6); Key animation (#10)	
2012	TV	Nekomonogatari	Akiyuki Shinbo; Tomoyuki Itamura	Shaft	Ending animation Eyecatch	
2013	TV	Monogatari Series Second Season	Akiyuki Shinbo; Tomoyuki Itamura; Naoyuki Tatsuwa; Yuki Yase	Shaft	Opening animation (Shinobu Time arc); Ending animation	
2014	TV	Nisekoi	Akiyuki Shinbo; Naoyuki Tatsuwa	Shaft	End card illustration (#2)	
2014	TV	Hanamonogatari	Akiyuki Shinbo; Tomoyuki Itamura	Shaft	Ending animation (Note: Used as the opening animation in the initial TV broadcast, but changed to the ending animation in the DVD/Blu-ray release.); Eyecatch	
2014	TV	Tsukimonogatari	Akiyuki Shinbo; Tomoyuki Itamura	Shaft	Ending animation	
2015	Short film	I Can Friday By Day	Kazuya Tsurumaki	Khara	Original concept Screenplay	
2015	TV	Owarimonogatari	Akiyuki Shinbo; Tomoyuki Itamura	Shaft	Opening animation (Shinobu Mail arc); Ending animation	
2016	ONA	Koyomimonogatari	Akiyuki Shinbo; Tomoyuki Itamura	Shaft	Ending animation	
2016	Movie	Kizumonogatari I: Tekketsu-hen	Akiyuki Shinbo; Tatsuya Oishi	Shaft	Key animation	
2017	Movie	Kizumonogatari III: Reiketsu-hen	Akiyuki Shinbo; Tatsuya Oishi	Shaft	Old Kizumonogatari (animation sequence)	
2017	TV	The Dragon Dentist	Kazuya Tsurumaki	Khara	Concept design	
2017	TV	March Comes in Like a Lion 2nd Season	Akiyuki Shinbo; Kenjirou Okada	Shaft	Illustration (#8)	
2017	TV	Owarimonogatari II	Akiyuki Shinbo; Tomoyuki Itamura	Shaft	Ending animation Hell image in the play (animation sequence)	
2018	TV	Darling in the Franxx	Atsushi Nishigori	A-1 Pictures; CloverWorks; Studio Trigger	Concept design assistance	
2018	TV	Fate/Extra Last Encore	Akiyuki Shinbo; Yukihiro Miyamoto	Shaft	Key animation (#9)	
2019	TV	Zoku Owarimonogatari	Akiyuki Shinbo	Shaft	Opening animation Ending animation	
2020	TV	Magia Record: Puella Magi Madoka Magica Side Story	Doroinu; Various	Shaft	Illustration (#5)	
2022	TV	RWBY: Ice Queendom	Toshimasa Suzuki; Kenjirou Okada	Shaft	Illustration (#4)	
2024	ONA	Monogatari Series Off & Monster Season	Akiyuki Shinbo; Midori Yoshizawa	Shaft	Ending animation Opening animation (Shinobu Mustard arc)	
2025	TV	Mobile Suit Gundam GQuuuuuuX	Kazuya Tsurumaki	Sunrise; Khara	Concept design	
