= Psychic Academy =

Manga and original net animation anime series

サイキックアカデミー煌羅万象 (Saikikku Akademī Ōra Banshō)
- Genre: Action, romantic comedy, supernatural
- Manga
- Written by: Katsu Aki
- Published by: Kodansha
- English publisher: NA: Tokyopop
- Magazine: Magazine Z
- Original run: August 1999 – March 2003
- Volumes: 11
- Original net animation
- Directed by: Shigeru Yamazaki
- Produced by: Tomoko Kawasaki; Masafumi Fukui; Tomohiro Yamada; Yasuharu Suidou
- Written by: Mitsuhiro Yamada
- Studio: E&G Films
- Licensed by: NA: Tokyopop
- Released: March 2002 – September 2002
- Runtime: 9–10 minutes per episode
- Episodes: 24

the Psychic Academy (サイキックアカデミー煌羅万象, Saikikku Akademī Ōra Banshō) is a Japanese seinen manga series written and illustrated by Katsu Aki. It was published by Kodansha in Magazine Z between 1999 and 2003. An anime ONA (original net animation) adaptation was producekd by E.G. Films in 2002. Both the manga and anime have been licensed in North America by Tokyopop.

== Plot ==
Psychic Academy follows the life of Ai Shiomi in modern-day Japan. He has psychic powers, also known as "aura power." This ability has emerged in the series world, but not every character possesses these powers. Aura power allows certain elements such as fire, water, ice, lightning, earth, wind, and light to be used by characters with this ability. The type of power they can use depends on their given aura power and what they are taught.

The main character Ai agrees to attend the Psychic Academy School after being pressured by his brother. The school is where elite students are taught how to use their elemental aura power.The main character Ai knows that somewhere within the Academy is his childhood friend Orina. However, at school, she is known as Sahra, because she goes after her aura code. On his way to his first day at school, Ai encounters a girl also going to that school named Myuu. She is another student at the Academy and is a very quiet, seemingly moody girl. Ai also learns that his older brother Zero, a legend amongst those with aura powers, will be one of his teachers.

As Ai struggles with his new school—a life he is not sure he wants—a crazy rabbit takes him as his student. His feelings for Orina and Myuu begin to develop and contrast, as the school year progress. Ai also makes discoveries about his rare light aura. To further complicate things, a group of researchers tries to artificially awaken the dormant aura genes within all humans, heedless of the danger and damage to society it might cause.

== Characters ==
Ai Shiomi (汐見 愛, Shiomi Ai) Voiced by: Daisuke Sakaguchi

Aura: Light

Ai believes he does not belong at Psychic Academy and is unsure of how to fit in, or what his special power is (which is later revealed to be the rare Light Aura). He is reunited with his childhood friend, Orina, and also makes some new friends, such as Myuu (Mew) and "Master Boo (Buu)". He has romantic feelings for Orina but at the same time is also shown to have a mysterious connection with Myuu.
His brother took him and ran away from their original home to hide the fact that Ai possesses a Light Aura. That Aura appears to have the potential to grow far beyond other Auras, although Ai still has not been able to figure out more than two words of his Aura Code. This has had little to no bearing on his overall aura strength. At the peak of his power, he is able to use the light aura to show an opponent's deepest secrets, as he did with Tokimitsu in their final battle. At the end of the series, he joins Zero in his quest to awaken the children of the aura around the world.

Myuu (ミュウ, Myū) Voiced by: Tsugumi Higasayama

Aura: Fire

Myuu (or Mew) wields the aura power of fire. She is distant, even to the point of slight rudeness, because of a traumatic experience in her past. During her childhood, she accidentally killed her mother during an Aura experiment. The explosion caused the lab sprinklers to go off, showering her shocked self with water; this caused her dislike for rain. Myuu is afraid of the rain to the point that she will miss days of school when it is raining, and possibly suffer panic attacks if forced to be out in a severe flood.
Myuu slowly warms up to Orina and Ai. She shares a bond from childhood with Ai, though neither of them realizes this bond at first. When she does, her feelings for him begin to blossom. However, she represses them most of the time in respect of Orina's relationship with Ai. At least one reason for her enormous aura strength is her father. He is an ambitious Aura scientist and has artificially altered—and possibly even artificially awakened—her Aura code. These make her stronger, but also make it dangerous for her to use her powers because when she uses them, she risks possibly dying. She both fears and dislikes her father intensely for it. In the final volume of the series, she passes away after admitting to Ai her feelings for him. Though she is dead, she is still able to visit Ai in the Para Dream.

Orina (織奈) Voiced by: Rie Tanaka

Aura: Water

Orina, also known as Saara (which is her Aura code name), is a childhood friend of Ai who still holds strong feelings for him. However, Ai is under the impression that she actually loves his brother. In the manga, the two have shared a romantic relationship which is sometimes shown as a love triangle between Orina, Ai, and Myuu. Orina's Aura is Water, which she usually employs for healing. Orina has a generally sweet demeanor, though she can be somewhat overbearing and pushy. She is immature sometimes, but she handles Ai's moods much easier than everyone else and can even calm him down when other people cannot. Despite Myuu's feelings for Ai, Orina is close friends with her and rarely displays jealousy towards Myuu. She was initially mistrustful of Faafa. Towards the end of the series, Ai's feelings for Myuu overshadow his feelings for Orina, and they decide to break off their romantic relationship but remain close friends.

Zero Voiced by: Hiroshi Kamiya

Aura: Steel

Zerodaimu Kyupura Pa Azaraku Vairu Rua Darogu is a famous psychic known as the "Vanquisher of the Dark Overlord". Zero's real name is Yuu Shiomi. He is the older brother of Ai Shiomi and cares deeply for him. Zero is also an instructor at Psychic Academy, though he seems to spend more time acting as a protector for his little brother than he does teaching classes. Girls often hit him when he tries to flirt with them (most of the time being his crush, Chiroro). His biggest downfall is when he starts telling and showing people Ai's darkest secrets. He also has an appalling taste in neckties. His Aura specialty is Steel. At the end of the story, together with his brother, he travels around the world to awaken the children of the Aura.

Faafa/Ren Voiced by: Reiko Takagi

Aura: Ice/Magma

A brother and sister sharing the same body. Faafa was incarcerated at the Aura Development Center in the United States. Ren, in an attempt to free Faafa, attacked the center; in the ensuing destruction, Ren died and Faafa was critically injured. A heart transplant from Ren's body allowed Faafa to survive while implanting a piece of Ren's aura in her body. As a result, the two share one body, similar to Dr Jekyll and Mr Hyde. However, in the para-dream, both Ren and Faafa have their own unique bodies. Fafa's Aura is ice, while Ren's is magma.
Because of their experiences with capture and torture, both Faafa and Ren are rather free-spirited and mischievous individuals who allow themselves to drift along their current moods. They have their own fun regardless of what others may think (which causes Ren on more than one occasion to be suspended from the Academy). Ren develops a friendly rivalry with Shiomi, while Faafa displays an open crush on him. At the end of the series, however, Ren's personality is erased in the story's final conflict, leaving Faafa alone.

Boo Velka Receptor Arba (ブウ, Bū) Voiced by: Shigeru Chiba

Aura: Crystal

Also known as Buu in the manga. Boo is a demented rabbit with very strong Aura powers who attaches himself to Ai as Ai's "Master". He believes Ai is one of the next great "Aura Masters." It is through "Master Boo's" training that Ai starts to discover how to use some of his own Aura power, and he learns it rather quickly. Boo's Aura specialty are Crystals.

Tokimitsu Shinano (unknown)

Aura: Gravity (Dark)

Tokimitsu shares much in common with Ai in that both of their aura codes start off undefined. Later, it is revealed that Tokimitsu carries a gravity or "dark" aura. Tokimitsu later takes on the name Gyurazu after his aura code. He is capable of drawing aura energy out of aura carriers, sometimes killing them outright and leaving their bodies as dried mummies.
Tokimitsu is a pet project of the Aura Development Center. He was taken by the A.D.C from his older sister, Nene, who is the priestess for a local shrine. However, he is only cooperating with them in order to heal his sister's ailing health. In a cruel twist of fate, Tokimitsu learns that his own power was the cause of his sister's weak constitution, and had been sucking her life after his powers awakened, ultimately bringing about her death. He has regressed to the age in which he had not awakened to his powers is without it after facing the full power of Ai's aura. He is the only one to have done so, and he is the first one to name Ai as an aura master.

Dr. Watabe

Aura: Plant

Dr. Watabe is the head of Aura Development Center. His main goal is to discover the Aura code and create the same powers as those born with Aura. On the public front, they want to better understand and control Aura, but Dr. Watabe's motive in doing this stems from his hatred toward Aura and the threat they pose. His earliest research consisted of experimenting on his own daughter, Mew. Unfortunately, this resulted in Mew losing control of her power. This created a lab explosion that killed his wife. Several years later, he successfully created a copy of Zero's power and also developed a unique Aura of Plant that he applied to himself. He is killed by Zero after he sucks his aura power from his body.

Chiroro Dapura

Aura: Water

A female teacher at the Academy. She has gathered the romantic attention of several individuals in school because she is attractive and kind, including Zero, the physical education teacher Goa, and the trouble-making student Tandja. Although she would like to marry, her calling in life is to teach aura carriers in the use of their abilities. She dislikes Zero's aggressive flirting and pompous behavior. However, she also harbors feelings for him but rather wishes to wait until he has his priorities and attitudes straightened out. Her family name is revealed as Wakana.

== Music ==
Opening theme "Say Over" by Rie Tanaka & Tsugumi Higasayama

Ending theme "Love Angel" by A-my with MION

== Reception ==
"For fans of the anime it's an easy thing to check out and recommended, but for casual fans, your mileage may vary." — Chris Beveridge, Mania.

"A lightweight, but still reasonably enjoyable series that isn't anywhere as original as its release format. My guess is that the manga is better." — Carlos Ross, T.H.E.M. Anime Reviews.
