= Sumie Sakai (voice actress) =

Japanese actress (born 1945)

- 坂井 寿美江
- Born: Sumie Fujino; April 6, 1945; Tokyo, Empire of Japan
- Died: October 30, 2024 (aged 79)
- Other names: Sumie Sakai (坂井 すみ江, Sakai Sumie)
- Occupations: Actress; voice actress
- Years active: 1963–2024
- Agent: Tokyo Actor's Consumer's Cooperative Society
- Height: 152 cm (5 ft 0 in)

Sumie Sakai (Japanese: 坂井 寿美江, Hepburn: Sakai Sumie; born April 6, 1945 – October 30, 2024) is a Japanese actress and voice actress who works for Tokyo Actor's Consumer's Cooperative Society. Her real name is Sumie Fujino (藤野 寿美江, Fujino Sumie).

She was formerly credited as Sumie Sakai (坂井 すみ江, Sakai Sumie).

Sakai died on October 30, 2024, at the age of 79.

== Filmography ==
=== TV series animation ===
Year	Title	Roles	Notes
1965	Kimba the White Lion		1965 series
1969	Attack No. 1	Midori Hayakawa	
1969	Kamui the Ninja	Tsugumi	
1972	Sabu to Ichi Torimono Hikae	Okyo	
1972	Devilman	Miki Makimura	
1973	Dororon Enma-kun	Princess Yukiko	
1976	Chōdenji Robo Combattler V	Yumi Arakawa	
2011	Dororon Enma-kun Meeramera	Enma's mother	

=== Tokusatsu ===
- Android Kikaider, Dark robot Pink armadillo
- Himitsu Sentai Gorenger, Big Ear Masked
- Battle Fever J (1979-1980) - Icicle Monster / Kuchisake Monster / Monshiro Ocho "Illusion Monster" (voice)
- Denshi Sentai Denziman (1980-1981) - Dokugaler / Aladdinlar / Deathmaskler (voice)
- Dengeki Sentai Changeman (1985) - Jellar (voice)
- Barom One
