= Pugyuru =

Japanese media franchise

- Cover art for the first volume of the Pugyuru manga published by Kodansha

ぷぎゅる
- Genre: Comedy
- Manga
- Written by: Tohiro Konno
- Published by: Kodansha
- Magazine: Magazine Z
- Original run: June 2001 – Sep, 2009
- Volumes: 7
- Anime television series
- Directed by: Hajime Kurihara
- Written by: Hiroyuki Nakaki
- Music by: Yasunori Mitsuda
- Studio: Two Thousand Creators.com
- Original network: Kids Station
- Original run: April 12, 2004 – July 5, 2004
- Episodes: 13

Pugyuru (ぷぎゅる) is a Japanese four-panel comic strip by Tohiro Konno. The manga was first serialized in the Japanese manga magazine Monthly Magazine Z in June, 2001. Pugyuru was adapted into an anime series that was broadcast on April 12, 2004, on the television station Kids Station. The initial broadcast lasted for thirteen episodes and ended on July 5, 2004.

== Characters ==
- Ma○○○ (ま○○○)

A tsukkomi character. Except for the first syllable, her name is never revealed in the comic. Anyone who hears her name, whether they want to or not, faces a terrible fate. She has called herself Margaret in a dream. She has a flat chest. She takes great effort to drink milk (and cola), but it has no effect. She has short hair, but the front part is blonde, and the rear part is black, it's implied that this is natural and reverses when she's asleep. Quite an unusual hair style. She has a black cowlick on the top of her head. She can use it as a fishing rod. When something pulls on her ahoge, the back part of her hair jumps up. When she loses it she faints. She has blue eyes.

- Cheko (チェコ)

A maid, or rather, a mysterious organism, that comes from the Maid Planet (in the anime, Maid Country). It looks like she sprouted, rather than being born. According to her, she's "the end of human evolution." She has a frilly thing on her head (it looks like a typical maid headdress) that can turn into a boomerang, cutlery, or even tissue paper. Also, the hair on her head can be used in similar ways. If anyone else wears it, it will self destruct or suck blood out of the person wearing it (it doesn't work on Kanato's mom, though). Her dream for the future is to become a sumo wrestler. Her head and body can be easily separated. Taking off her head is no problem at all. Up, down, left or right, her body is structurally symmetrical in all directions. Normal-sized humans can enter her body through her mouth. She has blue, short hair. Her eyes are green. She is named after the Czech Republic (Similar to Hetalia)

* {{nihongo|'''Nachiko'''|ナチ子}}

A squid with a human face attached. Besides her normal face, she also has faces for going out, dating, and attacking. In summer, she becomes a cooked squid. Lately, she has not made many appearances. It seems the author got tired of drawing her. Her final appearance was in volume three. Her fake head has black hair. Her eyes are violet.

- Mizore (ミゾレ)

A snow woman. She doesn't like being cold. She has large breasts. She's usually cheerful and likes to drink, but when she drinks cola she turns into the evil "Mizore Black". She returns to normal after she burps. If she drinks blood, she turns red. She can grind her body to make shaved ice. Her body is cold, so she is popular in the summer. She usually just melts though. She likes hot springs, but when she gets in the water it completely freezes. If she writes "hot spring mark" on the ground and goes to sleep on it, she'll melt. She has light-purple, short hair. She has long bangs. If she has a left eye, it is always covered by her bangs. In her right eye, her pupil is red. Between her black knee socks and the hem of her short, white robe, she has some absolute territory.

- Kanato (カナト)

A yankee and a fighter. She's a girl that loves cute things and nail bats. She also likes chainsaws. Her hobby is beating and kicking people. She keeps several nail bats on her back. If you steal her nail bat, she becomes confused. She can make certain-kill technique beams, but the beams only come out of uncool parts of her body (like her ears, feet or her backside). She is especially skilled at catching a naked blade. Though she doesn't surpass Mizore, she has large breasts. She has messy, silver hair. She has scarlet eyes. She is a little bit tsundere.

- Nurse (保健医, Hoken'i)

She's a woman, but also perverted (like a middle-aged man). She usually sexually harasses female students. Her three sizes are bust 93 cm, waist 58 cm, hips 86 cm. She's a master at breathing. She is usually able to unhook the bras of female students with her breath. She likes to drink. She has dark blue eyes. She is always wearing her white coat.

- Aniki (アニキ)

A guy in the yakuza. A local boss. He loves Cheko-chan. He has a widow's peak. He has a small mustache.

- Sabu (サブ)

Aniki's underling. He loves Cheko-chan. He is completely bald.

- Reo (レオ)

Aniki's daughter. Her father's love for Cheko-chan bothered her, so she was trying to kill Cheko. Now, she gets along with Cheko. For a long time, she had guns stuck to her hands. Recently, she lost her "urge to kill" and the guns fell off. However, she still carries around various weapons (hidden). If you bump into her shoulder, a lot of weapons will fall down. She has black, long hair. Her eyes are green.

- ???

The mysterious organism normally attached to Mizore's head. It has been given several names, but its real name is unknown. Its whole body is shaped like an eyeball, but it can grow arms and legs when it needs to move. It can be eaten once in a while, probably for emergency rations. As it is part of Mizore's body it grows back very quickly.

- Nishimura (西村)

The result of putting Cheko's head on a male student's body. Ma○○○ and Reo have fallen in love with him. He's probably good at basketball.

- Hisame (ヒサメ)

Mizore's younger brother, the yeti. He looks like a girl. He's really cute. He has light-purple, long hair tied with black ribbons into twin tails. He has red eyes. Since he's a yeti, he has a fluffy tail. But, for some reason the tail disappeared because he doesn't have money. He likes donuts. He can make snow blow fiercely. Just like Mizore, he wears a short-hemmed, white robe. Since he wanted to be a maid, Cheko accepted him as her disciple. He calls Cheko "Master". For some reason, he says "~sane" at the end of his sentences. Unlike Mizore, he doesn't melt when it gets hot.

- Teacher (先生, Sensei)

A completely normal teacher who is usually killed. Has not appeared lately.

- Gabriolle (ガブリヨル, Gaburiyoru)

Maid dog. It likes to eat maids. It has narrow eyes that are scary to be seen up close. Its cry sounds like "sun" rather than arf. It has not appeared lately.

- Kanato's Mother (カナトの母, Kanato no haha)

Kanato's mother who first appeared in volume 5 (she appeared as a silhouette at the end of volume 4). It seems like she's divorced from her husband and she is raising Kanato as a single parent. Even Mizore can't compare to her beauty (about the same as the Nurse) and she has the strongest attack power on Earth. Also, her old scars show when she gets serious. She's a mother that likes to make funny lunches, she has a poker face and she does manyamazing things (especially for Kanato) and Kanato admires her very much. She usually doesn't say more than one word when she talks, but she has the unique ability to converse through tobacco smoke. Her name is hinted to be Kanatora in volume 6 from hand-me-downs (possibly from Kanato's grandmother) but this has not been confirmed.

== Bibliographical Information ==
=== Tankoubon ===
Published by Magazine Z KC instead of Kodansha.

1. Volume 1 (March 23, 2004) ISBN 4-06-349141-2
2. Volume 2 (May 21, 2004) ISBN 4-06-349174-9
3. Volume 3 (February 23, 2005) ISBN 4-06-349197-8
4. Volume 4 (January 23, 2006) ISBN 4-06-349233-8
5. Volume 5 (October 23, 2006) ISBN 4-06-349263-X
6. Volume 6 (August 23, 2007) ISBN 978-4-06-349303-0
7. Volume 7 (June 23, 2008) ISBN 978-4-06-349364-1

Except for volume 3, the volumes each include a bonus comic at the end of the book. There is also a bonus comic on the inside of the dust cover.

== Anime ==
A Pugyuru anime was broadcast on April 12, 2004, on Kids Station during the Anime Paradise block. Thirteen episodes total. Each episode is based on two to four strips from the original manga. The ending animation for each episode is different every time and is also based on strips from the original manga.

=== Staff ===
- Original Creator - Tohiro Konno
- Director - Hajime Kurihara (Creators Dot Com)
- Script - Hiroyuki Nakaki (Creators Dot Com)
- Sound Director - Tomohiro Yoshida
- Music - Yasunori Mitsuda
- Animation Studio - Creators Dot Com
- Production - Pugyuru Production Committee

=== Cast ===
- Ma○○○ - Sakura Nogawa
- Cheko - Ai Tokunaga
- Kanato - Yuu Asakawa
- Mizore - Kumi Sakuma
- Nachiko - Miki Narahashi
- Nurse - Miho Yamada
- Aniki - Toshihide Tsuchiya
- Sabu - Toshimichi Seki
- Teacher - Nobuyuki Hiyama

=== Episode Titles ===
1. My New Life With Cheko-chan
2. Cheko-chan and the Scary People
3. Cheko-chan and Mizore
4. Cheko-chan and Nachiko
5. Ma... and the Exchange Students
6. Cheko-chan and Kanato
7. Nurse and Everyone
8. Mizore and the Part Time Job
9. Squid... No, the Name is Nachiko
10. Cheko-chan and the Mysterious Button
11. Kanato and School Life
12. The Maid and Cheko-chan
13. Cheko-chan and the Experiment
