= Othello (Satomi Ikezawa manga) =

2001–2004 shoujo manga

- North American cover of the first volume

オセロ (Osero)
- Genre: Romance
- Manga
- Written by: Satomi Ikezawa
- Published by: Kodansha
- English publisher: NA: Del Rey; UK: Tanoshimi
- Magazine: Bessatsu Friend
- Original run: August 6, 2001 – September 13, 2004
- Volumes: 7

Othello (Japanese: オセロ, Hepburn: Osero) is a shōjo manga series by Satomi Ikezawa. It was originally serialized by Kodansha in Bessatsu Friend and collected in seven tankōbon volumes. It is distributed by Del Rey Manga in North America. The story is about a shy, naive Japanese teenager with a split personality.

The manga is titled after the board game Othello, and not the Shakespearian play. The game involves a lot of switching back and forth between black and white pieces, representing Yaya and Nana's constant flip-flop.

== Plot ==
Yaya is a shy, quiet teen with a passion for singing, Japanese rock music, Gothic Lolita, cosplay and music in general. But she has a secret: When she looks in a mirror or hits her head, Yaya's second personality, aptly named Nana, takes over her body and puts the wrong-doers in their places, shouting her catchphrase "Heavenly Punishment!" and once the damage is dealt, "Justice is done!"

The series chronicles Yaya and Nana's somewhat episodic adventures against bullies, perverts, and generally mean people. The manga also has a lot to do with music, as several of the characters have connections to the music industry or play in a band.

Though this is a different manga, Pon-chan (another manga, Guru-Guru Pon Chan, by the same author) shows up.

== Characters ==
Yaya Higuchi
Yaya is an innocent and timid teenager who, because of her personality, is constantly attacked and ridiculed by people who claim to be her friends. She likes to wear Gothic Lolita on Sundays, and likes Japanese rock groups, but no one knows about it and she considers it her "true self". As a result of her being unable to do anything but go along with people who treat her badly, she develops an alter-ego named Nana. Yaya becomes fearful that she may be going insane, because she is not aware of her Nana personality, and doesn't remember large chunks of time because of it. Nana often appears if Yaya looks in a mirror, hits her head or falls asleep, but also comes out if Yaya really needs help. When she finds out about her alter-ego, Yaya gets scared and locks herself up inside, so Nana is always out. She comes to terms with it later, though, and the two girls are able to happily share one body, and even change on command. Eventually, as Yaya becomes stronger, Nana's interventions are no longer needed and she apparently fades away for good. However, it is later revealed that the two personalities have merely come together, with both Yaya and Nana's personality traits present within one conscious body.
Yaya has an interest in a visual kei band called Juliet and looks up to the lead singer of Juliet, even though the make-up band disappeared a while ago.
Nana
Unlike the very shy Yaya, Nana is tough, cunning, sarcastic, and bold. She comes out whenever Yaya needs help because of her inability to stand up for herself. Nana kicks butt throughout the series, and reveals several people as fakes. Her phrase, whenever she accomplishes her goal, is "Justice is done!" Nana becomes a guest singer for the group "Black Dog" a few times, and later has Yaya sing with them. She gets to be out for a long while when Yaya locks herself up. Nana eventually goes away when Yaya no longer needs her to fix her messes.
Moriyama
Yaya's handsome classmate and talented guitarist who begins a tentative romantic relationship with her. At the beginning of the series, Yaya feels that he is somewhat unkind, but in time she realizes that he is a caring person. He is one of the few people who are genuinely kind to Yaya, and helps her when Nana's existence becomes more than she can handle. He is the lead singer of the popular rock group, Black Dog. He lets Yaya become the Black dog's manager. He then also realizes that he loves Yaya as much as she loves him.
Seri and Moe
Yaya's classmates and alleged friends who actually take pleasure in tormenting her. They call her names and treat her like their servant. They are the first ones to discover Yaya is into Gothic Lolita but fail to actually reveal it to anyone, as Nana stops them.
Shōhei Shinyoji
Moriyama's adult friend who has taken an interest in Nana's voice and may also be trying to pursue a more intimate relationship with her. Yaya idolizes him because he is the former singer of the band 'Juliet', a rock band created by the music industry. Shōhei says that he is done with Juliet.
Megumi Hano (Hano-chan)
A bright and optimistic transfer student who turns out to be a sadistic, jealous, and selfish manipulator and fangirl of Moriyama's. She sets her sights on Yaya when she discovers how close she is to Moriyama. Hano pressures Yaya into signing a contract that would supposedly get her into the music industry and meet Shōhei. But, in actuality, Hano nearly forces Yaya into prostitution to profit off her. Nana "defeats" her during a sky diving challenge Hano instigates. Megumi has an older brother, Keisuke, who was the drummer for Juliet. Keisuke holds a grudge against Shōhei for leaving the band, which caused the band to fall apart.
Shūko
Moriyama's strong-willed ex-girlfriend, who suddenly appears and tries to take Moriyama back, just as he is getting closer with Yaya. Shūko reveals to Yaya her alter-ego when she records her becoming Nana on her phone's camera. When Shūko realizes how much Moriyama cares for Yaya, she backs off and leaves them to develop their relationship.
Black Dog
Moriyama's band, of which he is the lead singer and lead guitarist. The other three members, Furuta, Ukon and Awane, are all college age. Their name comes from the Led Zeppelin song "Black Dog".

== Release ==
Written and illustrated by Satomi Ikezawa, the chapters of Othello were serialized in the Japanese magazine Bessatsu Friend and collected into seven tankōbon volumes by Kodansha. The volumes were published from August 6, 2001, to September 13, 2004.

Del Rey licensed Othello for an English-language release in North America and published the seven volumes from October 12, 2004, to February 28, 2006. In the United Kingdom, Tanoshimi published Othello from May 3, 2007, to November 1, 2007. The series is also licensed in Germany by Egmont Manga & Anime, and in France by Pika Édition.

=== Volume list ===
No.	Original release date	Original ISBN	North American release date	North American ISBN
1	August 6, 2001	978-4-06-341249-9	October 12, 2004	978-0-345-47913-6
2	September 11, 2002	978-4-06-341301-4	December 28, 2004	978-0-345-47948-8
3	February 13, 2003	978-4-06-341323-6	March 29, 2005	978-0-345-47998-3
4	July 11, 2003	978-4-06-341344-1	June 28, 2005	978-0-345-48000-2
5	December 12, 2003	978-4-06-341364-9	September 27, 2005	978-0-345-47796-5
6	April 13, 2004	978-4-06-341382-3	December 27, 2005	978-0-345-48438-3
7	September 13, 2004	978-4-06-341402-8	February 28, 2006	978-0-345-48439-0
