= Deus Vitae =

Japanese manga series

ディーヴァ (D'V)
- Genre: Science fiction
- Manga
- Written by: Takuya Fujima
- Published by: Kodansha
- English publisher: NA: Tokyopop
- Magazine: Magazine Z
- Original run: August 23, 2000 – April 23, 2002
- Volumes: 3

Deus Vitae, or D'V (ディーヴァ, DīVa) is a manga series created by Takuya Fujima.

== Plot ==
In 2068, Leave, a powerful android, is created by the Brain Computer and raised by the human scientist Fenrir to be the new root of mankind; the "Goddess", deciding that the previous human beings are no longer useful, wipes them out and creates four "mothers", each one in charge of a different quarter of the world, and a new race of androids, the Selenoids, classified in castes depending on their strength.

Ash Ramy is one of the few human survivors, member of the Revolutional Organization; after killing a high-ranking Selenoid, he escapes with the help of Lemiu Winslet, one of the lower ranking Selenoids, who joins his fight against the new Goddess.
