= Takeaki =

- Gender: Male

Origin
- Origin: Japanese
- Meaning: Different meanings depending on the kanji used

Takeaki (written: 武揚, 武昭 or 剛明) is a masculine Japanese given name. Notable people with the name include:

- Enomoto Takeaki (榎本 武揚; 1836–1908), Japanese samurai and Imperial Japanese Navy admiral
- Takeaki Matsumoto (松本 剛明; born 1959), Japanese politician
- Takeaki Momose (百瀬 武昭; born 1970), Japanese manga artist
