= Q-Ko-chan =

Japanese manga series

- Cover to volume 1 of Q-Ko-Chan: The Earth Invader Girl.

QコちゃんTHE地球侵略少女 (Q-Ko-Chan: The Chikyū Shinryaku Shōjo)
- Genre: Science fiction
- Manga
- Written by: Hajime Ueda
- Published by: Kodansha
- English publisher: Del Rey Manga (North America)
- Magazine: Magazine Z
- Original run: 2003 – 2004
- Volumes: 2

Q-Ko-chan: The Earth Invader Girl (QコちゃんTHE地球侵略少女, Kyūko-chan: The Chikyū Shinryaku Shōjo) is a manga series by Hajime Ueda. The two-volume series has been released in the United States by Del Rey Manga.

== Characters ==
=== Pilots ===
- Kirio Muji: The kind of guy who just drifts through life not turning his head in either direction. He doesn't like his sister much, for unknown reasons. Kirio also two friends at school, Noru and Tatsuta. Decided to house Q-Ko in his closet when she collapses but doesn't even bother to find out her name right away. Though Kirio is very aloof, he cares about his friends, and has a perverse sense of justice. Such as when he tried to kill the older boys who had injured Tatsuta. Pilots Q-Ko in battle.
- Furiko Muji: the sister of Kirio, she is very timid and stays away from her brother by all means necessary. Though the mother is rarely home, and tells Kirio to take care of her. She believes that Kirio is the reason why her mother is never around to take care of her. Furiko also likes books a lot (to the point of skipping school so she can go to the library), and can cook. Suffers from a weak heart, actual disease unknown, and has attacks every so often which cause her to lose consciousness. She pilots AA-ko-sama and attacks Q-Ko and Kirio.
- Noru Momozawa: One of Kirio's closest friends, he is wise and is described as "arcane". He is very young, yet very perceptive and seems to know more than he lets others think. Noru has a tendency to indirectly guide Kirio on the right path and he also has a strong understanding of many of the functions that SS-Ko possesses. He also seems to somehow have knowledge concerning the Universal Child Welfare Organization. He also has a dog, which he states on page 57. He pilots SS-Ko in battle.
- Tatsuta Katsumoto: In many ways, Tatsuta is the complete opposite of Kirio. He is extremely anxious and does not react well to stressful situations. He also becomes emotionally invested in situations very easily, which causes him to miscalculate (as when he accidentally pilots his robot into power lines). Tatsuta's eye was permanently injured by older students in a fight, and harbored a deep grudge against them because of the wound. However, when given the chance to kill the students during an alien attack, he prefers to take the more moral route and let them go. However, these moral strides against his need for revenge are negated after he is injured by members of Black Hare at the end of the second book. Also seems to be very uncomfortable around girls, even his own Doll to some extent. He pilots NH-Ko.
- Mei Kurozawa: An extremely spunky girl, she looks out for her friend Shiino and tries to get Kirio to care a little more about what affects his actions have on others. She is the pilot of RK-Ko.
- Shiino Ino: A kind but weak spirited girl whose brother becomes obsessed with an alien baby he discovered. Initially, Shiino is too timid to board a robot, but she eventually befriends VV-Ko of the infamous ‘Black Series’.
- Otayama: An adult photographer (his subjects, most often, are the unwilling young children at Kirio's school) that briefly piloted VV-Ko. Unfortunately for him, the ‘Black Series’ dolls are a “trap” as stated by Q-Ko, and he is violently killed after entering the doll. It is also noticed that Otayama looks very similar to Hajime Ueda himself.
- Girl from Tomunchap Makes a very brief appearance, and her true name is never known. Is in a flash back on page 114, at the end of chapter 5. After she tells the Chinese soldiers that her doll is a friend, they ask her if she can help them fight the Japanese army.

=== Other Humans ===
- Major Ririko Muji: She is Kirio and Furiko's mother, though she is rarely home due to her job. She works in the local branch of the Black Hares. The full extent of her work is never stated, though her main office was in the 'Doll room', where several of the dolls were kept (one of them being RK.KO-chan) 15 years ago Ririko had gone to China where she first saw the dolls.
- Lt. Akaza: Another member of the Black Hares. Is an impatient soldier whose real motivations were never truly revealed. Pilots a 'Bucket head' mech, which most other soldiers would be too embarrassed to fly. He also has an attraction to Ririko.
- Kaptain-chan: The leader of an organization called JAG G. She has a rather bubbly personality, yet is utterly heartless, due to how she has no qualms against killing children to destroy Dolls.
- Katsuki Usumi An unpopular boy at Kirio's school. In the beginning of the first manga its stated that he can't fit in because he can't get used to his situation. Near the end of the second manga, he informs the Black Hares and G-Jag about the other pilots.

=== Dolls ===
The robots, or dolls, are part of the Universal Child Welfare Organization, whose goal seems to be to protect children worthy of protection by their standards. They also seem to aim to dispose of the "trash among the children" as well. The organization is made up of 130 dolls, though they refer to themselves as the "130 Sisters Welfare Machines", indicating that they were made to destroy and protect. These "sisters" were governed by the Council of Nine Sisters, composed of the eldest nine sisters. This council was governed by the Waste Removal Bureau, which is possibly a part of the Black Hare Organization. It seems, however, that the 130 Sisters opposed the last mission given to them by the Bureau, which ordered them to obey their commands and "purify" the "illegal star system" (the Solar System) of "illegal life-forms" (the aliens that attacked the 13 Wards). Afterwards, while chaos broke apart the 130 Sisters, Q-Ko took on her ground mission (no details were given about the ground mission except it was considered treason by the Council of Nine Sisters) and ended up losing her memory in the process. The sisters once again re-united and many acquired new pilots, but only a few of the dolls' names are given.

- Q-Ko: The second protagonist in the series. Q-ko is a cute, shy, and naive robot whose memory was lost while taking on an un-detailed mission. She ends up with Kirio as her pilot, although it seems as if that is so only because she did not make contact with Furiko first. In many ways, she is just like a human; she eats (though she does not chew), she gets hungry, and apparently can feel love and compassion for real humans, like Kirio. In battle, she utilizes a small shield in the shape of a heart and can slice enemies apart with a single laser sword that extends from the fingers of her right hand. Q-ko has large bunny-ear-like panels that are the same color as her hair, they float in place through means unknown. They appear to act similar to wings, streamlining her movements while flying for added speed. She is or was a member of the Council of Nine Sisters and is the ninth oldest of all the 130 Sisters. Q.KO's personality is similar to Canti from FLCL (also by Ueda) seeing as they are both powerful, but seem to have lost their ability to fight well after they broke. They are also both easily embarrassed.
- AA-Ko: Possibly the antagonist of the series. AA-ko is cool and collected, yet harbors a cold and bitter hate towards her "mother", whose identity is never revealed in the story. She also does not like Q-Ko, but they treat one another with respect as they are the only ones who remain out of the 9 Eldest Sisters. Furiko becomes her pilot and also seems to be a hindrance for AA-Ko. She almost never loses her composure, even in the midst of battle. When in her robot form, she utilizes two diamond-shaped shields and her hair as weapons. She uses her hair as weapons by extending it into needles that reach an incredible length. AA-Ko resembles a Japanese ghost to a degree, in that she has long black hair that she can use as a weapon, wears a white kimono, holds her arms in front of her, has invisible feet, and can apparently levitate. She has two diamond-shaped white panels (resembling rabbit ears to a degree) floating above her head through unknown means. Without her kimono (in a scene where she bathes, as example), she appears to be an ordinary Asian teenage girl, with the exception of a visible glowing heart and two floating diamond-shaped panels above her head, which resemble rabbit ears. Compared to the other dolls, her design is unique. She is said to be the strongest of the 130 Sisters.
- SS-Ko: SS-Ko is a strict doll wearing a wide brimmed hat, a cape (like the others.) and rain coat-like dress. She is calm but strict, and will follow rules and orders to the end. She knows a great deal of information concerning Q-Ko and viewed her as a role model before she lost her memory. She is also very mean to Q-Ko and often scolds her. She also describes the love that Q-Ko feels towards Kirio to be a malfunction in her programming, yet is fully aware of the truth behind the situation. She is not very fond of Kirio, possibly due to his misuse of Q-Ko's abilities. She does, however, help Kirio find Q-Ko after she runs away from him and even loses her cool composure when he is frustrated by her riddle. Like Noru, her pilot, SS-Ko seems to know a great deal about the events going on in the story and acts as the mediator between AA-Ko and the other 130 Sisters. In battle, SS-Ko can utilize two laser swords identical to Q-Ko's and also seems to be able to fly faster than her. The flower-like adornment atop her hat acts as a signal beam, but it apparently only works when in her robotic form. She also bears some resemblance to the giant robot from FLCL.
- VV-Ko: VV-Ko is the only black series doll mentioned by name in the series. She has also been referred to as "Gothlolita", which connotes her style, with black Victorian-era "gothic" clothing and spiral locks of hair. She is first piloted by a photographer nicknamed "Otayama". She has an attack that causes a huge explosion, at the cost of the life of her pilot, so Otayama was apparently disposable to her. After adopting Shiino Ino as a pilot, VV-Ko shows a more compassionate side, though she still appears to be mute (she also ate the chocolate Shiino bought for her, which is unusual because, as noted by one of the other dolls, Black Series dolls typically only eat living flesh). In her robot form, the ribbon tied behind her outfit resembles bat wings, but she can undo them to use as a single black ribbon, which she spins into a spiral spear, from which she can unleash an explosion.
- RK-Ko: RK-Ko is designed to look like a Native American Indian, and is piloted by Mei. Generally quiet and objective, RK-Ko is quick to nullify SS-Ko's critiques of Q-Ko by pointing out that Q-Ko is damaged, and therefore not entirely responsible for her actions. Despite this, RK-Ko still looks to SS-Ko to lead, and shows particular concern for her pilot's welfare. RK-Ko's weapon is a diamond-shaped tomahawk.
- NH-Ko: NH-Ko is designed to resemble a girl wearing Italian Tyrolean clothing, with her hat and dress (when in robot mode), she doesn't say a lot but her lines seems to indicate that she cares a lot about her pilot, she can also be quite the hothead, and has a strong disliking of the black-series...
- One armed doll: She is never referred to by name, but fans refer to her as X-Ko (as in her X-shaped symbols on some places). She never utters a line, but she seems to be a victim of a failed friendship with a doll, because in the first scene of part. Another doll is killed by human forces, and X-Ko obliterates them by forcing a pilot inside her and uses him as ammunition for her attack (similarly to VV-Ko). Before that she reaches out her only hand towards the dying doll. Later on, she just makes brief appearances, among others in a flashback: where she is seen sitting behind the past Q-Ko in similar garb to the past Q-Ko (a ragged poncho). It is also seen that she lacks an eye, and wears a large white eye patch with an X on it, as well as white pieces of paper that hangs down the sides of her head (also with X's). Though in her doll for she wears a white head band. She also lacks a left arm, as seen in the first scene of part 2. Near the end, she dons a long black, hooded robe, giving her the appearance of a grim reaper. In the last scene, she flies along with the other 130 dolls, to their leader AA-Ko. She also appears in a short comic Ueda did for Faust, though very little in known about it.

== Manga ==
No.	Original release date	Original ISBN	English release date	English ISBN
1	July 17, 2003	978-4-06-349133-3	July 25, 2006	978-0-345-49208-1
2	December 21, 2004	978-4-06-349186-9	October 2006	978-0-345-49209-8
