= Demon Prince Enma =

Japanese anime and manga series created by Go Nagai

- Cover of the volume 2 of Demon Prince Enma released by Bandai Visual USA.

鬼公子炎魔 (Kikōshi Enma)
- Manga
- Written by: Go Nagai
- Published by: Kodansha
- Magazine: Magazine Z
- Original run: April 2006 – June 2006
- Volumes: 2
- Original video animation
- Directed by: Mamoru Kanbe
- Written by: Takao Yoshioka
- Music by: Kayo Konishi; Yukio Kondō
- Studio: Brain's Base
- Licensed by: NA: Bandai Entertainment
- Released: August 25, 2006 – March 23, 2007
- Episodes: 4
- Manga

Satanikus Enma Kerberos
- Written by: Go Nagai
- Illustrated by: Eiji Karasuyama
- Published by: Kodansha
- Magazine: Magazine Z
- Original run: June 26, 2007 – January 26, 2009
- Volumes: 4

Demon Prince Enma (Japanese: 鬼公子炎魔, Hepburn: Kikōshi Enma) is a Japanese horror anime and manga series created by Go Nagai. It is a sequel/remake of Dororon Enma-kun. The manga version of Demon Prince Enma would get a sequel called Satanikus Enma Kerberos by Eiji Karasuyama in 2007.

== Plot ==
Four grown demons (Enma, Yukihime, Kapaeru, and Grandpa Chapeauji) are part of a Yokai-Patrol searching for demons that have escaped from Hell into the human world. They form the group known as the Enma Detective Agency as a cover for their activities.

== Main characters ==
Enma (炎魔)
Voiced by: Yukitoshi Tokumoto
He has returned to the mortal world in order to get rid of the demons that have escaped from the underworld. He is a fire-based demon and he's the nephew of Enma-Daio. His name in Kanji means flame demon and it's read the same way as Enma, the ruler of the underworld.
Yukihime (雪鬼姫)
Voiced by: Saeko Chiba
She is an ice-based demon who acts as the partner of Enma in their endeavour to return the escaped demons to the underworld. In the OVA, while she has a cold personality and certain disdain for Enma on the surface, she actually is in love with him but knows and regrets that they cannot be together since they are opposing forces (Ice/Flame). This situation plays an important part when she gets possessed by a demon. Her name means snow devil princess and its probably related to the Japanese folklore myth of Yuki-onna.
Kapaeru (カパエル)
Voiced by: Setsuji Satoh
He is a kappa who has been living in the mortal realm for many years. He is in charge of gathering information regarding the location of the hunted demons. In the OVA, he has fooled persons into believing that his appearance is a disguise. He has a secret contact (whom he holds dear) that helps him get most of the clues of the cases. Both of them die at the hands of the demon that possesses Yukihime. In the manga, he tricks and betrays Enma and Yukihime.
Grandpa Chapeauji (シャポ爺, Shapojii)
Voiced by: Yūichi Nagashima
An old demon with the form of a hat, he possesses great knowledge in all the matters related to the underworld and demons. In the OVA, he is often sleeping because of his old age and is mostly in the head of Enma. While he rarely takes action, he advises Enma of the best course of action as well as alerting him of the presence of demons. In the manga, he is younger, can change of shape and appearance, has a more aggressive personality and a more active role.
Nobusama (膿腐吸魔)
Voiced by: Yasumichi Kushida
A Vampire type Rot-Pus Suck Demon.

== Media ==
=== OVA ===
No.	Title	Original release date
1	"Nobusuma: Rot-Pus Suck Demon" (Japanese: 膿腐吸魔)	August 25, 2006
In the city, Enma and Yukihime follow and confront an injured and frightened woman and expel and destroy the small demon inhabiting her. Elsewhere, a beautiful blonde woman called Ms Chigusa is working as a prostitute, but begins waking up to find her clients dead and drained of blood. One day, a man named Heinrich, who teaches German history at university, arrives at Enma's Detective Agency as client. He wants them to find his beautiful blonde daughter called Lola. Days later Lola arrives home splattered with blood and tells her father that she may be a vampire. Enma, Yukihime and Kapaeru arrive at the same time and suspect Lola of being possessed by a demon. Too late, they realize that the father is possessed after he kills his daughter. Enma eventually exorcises and destroys the demon, but he regrets their delay in locating it.
2	"Piguma: Corpseless Demon" (Japanese: 非躯魔)	October 27, 2006
Nanami, a waitress at a cabaret club complains to the manager that clients are touching her, but he says it's part of the job. She finds solace in a doll that her boyfriend Sabu gave her, but Kapaeru finds the doll suspicious. Nanami arrives home early to find Sabu in bed with another woman. She throws the doll out of the window, wishing Sabu and the other woman were dead. The couple then encounter the doll in an alleyway and it kills them. Meanwhile the police investigate the increasing number of violent murders. The doll goes on a murderous spree in the club, killing people Nanami doesn't like and possesses the waitresses working there. Enma and Kapaeru are attacked in the club by the possessed waitresses, but are saved by the arrival of Yukihime. They realize the demon possessed Nanami and not the doll, and Enma destroys the demon. Later the police find the bodies strewn within the club.
3	"Karuma: Misery Swirling Demon" (Japanese: 禍流魔)	January 26, 2007
The mother of young girl, Sachiko, and friend of Kapaeru, is possessed by a demon. She kills her husband and threatens Sachiko who is saved at the last moment by Enma and Kapaeru. Meanwhile, a demon painfully exits Yukihime and Grandpa Chapeauji tells Enma that a demon that they thought had been destroyed was still alive. Kapaeru and Sachiko are attacked and left for dead. A young girl enters an abandoned apartment block and is confronted by a series of strange events. Guided by a woman in white kimono, two lost hikers, Buddha Daiko and Ayukawa Ayu come across a mansion where they meet a teacher Yoshinaga but together cannot find the exit which has disappeared. They then meet Inspector Abashiri and Yuri Benten, a journalist, also trapped in the building. The see a strange painting of 5 figures and another figure partly visible. They explore the mansion which seems to consist of endless corridors and windowless rooms. Ayu becomes separated and is haunted by the vision of a piano teacher she injured in the past and who later committed suicide.
4	"Enma" (Japanese: 炎魔)	March 23, 2007
Still within the mansion, the others find Ayu dead in the piano room. They explore the mansion which seems to be a former hospital. Daiko is separated and sees a vision of her ex-boyfriend who committed suicide. Elsewhere Yoshinaga attacks and tries to rape Yuri. She fights back, but he appears possessed by a demon and pursues her. Meanwhile Daiko finds a basement but is drowned in a tub of water. Yuri and Abashiri find her body and Yuri realizes that the house is feeding on the darkness in their hearts. Yoshinaga finds them and takes Abashiri's gun, but then kills himself. They find themselves back in the dining room where the painting of 5 figures now shows three as skeletons, representing those who have died. Abashiri then sees Yuri being captured threatened by a woman in white kimono. Suddenly Enma appears and exposes a demon which had been inhabiting Yukihime's body. During the battle, before Enma can destroy it, the demon kills Abashiri to Yuri's horror. Eventually Enma prevails and leaves with Yukihime who has no recollection of the events. Yuri tries to leave with them, but she realizes that she has been killed during the struggle and there are now 5 skeletons in the painting.

=== Manga ===
==== Satanikus Enma Kerberos ====
Satanikus ENMA Kerberos (Satanikus ENMA ケルベロス, Satanikus ENMA Keruberosu) or Satanikus ENMA Κέρβερος is a direct sequel to the Demon Prince Enma, with no relation to the OVA. Its serialization started on June 26, 2007, in the number of August 2007 of Kodansha's Magazine Z. While Demon Prince Emma is an adult horror-action manga, Satanikus ENMA Kerberos takes a less serious tone and becomes slightly more lighthearted. The focus of the series is the quest to revive Enma.

No.	Release date	ISBN
1	November 22, 2007	978-4-06-349320-7
2	May 23, 2008	978-4-06-349358-0
3	November 21, 2008	978-4-06-349394-8
4	March 23, 2009	978-4-06-349429-7

== Reception ==
Helen McCarthy in 500 Essential Anime Movies says the violence is "extreme", but "it's stylishly designed and animated". She praises the soundtrack and humor, which is "well integrated in the characters".
