= Guru Guru Pon-chan =

Japanese manga series

- The cover of the first volume of Guru Guru Pon-chan

ぐるぐるポンちゃん
- Genre: Romantic comedy
- Manga
- Written by: Satomi Ikezawa
- Published by: Kodansha
- English publisher: Del Rey Manga (United States); Tanoshimi (United Kingdom)
- Magazine: Bessatsu Friend
- Original run: 1998 – 2000
- Volumes: 9

Guru Guru Pon-chan (ぐるぐるポンちゃん; "Spinning Pon-chan") is a Japanese manga series by Satomi Ikezawa about a Labrador puppy, named Ponta, who turns into a human and falls in love with Mirai Iwaki, who's very popular in his school. In 2000, it won the Kodansha Manga Award for shōjo. It was published in the United States by Del Rey Manga.

== Plot ==
Ponta, the Koizumi family's Labrador Retriever puppy one day eats the 'talking bone' that the grandfather invented to allow an animal who licks it the power of speech. Instead of just being able to talk however, she transforms into a human girl. When she rushes out into traffic as a girl, she is saved by the most popular boy at school and falls in love with him. To be near him she enrolls in school and tries to learn how to live as a human.

== Characters ==
- Ponta Koizumi — The lead character of the series. Grandpa Koizumi's invention transformed her from a puppy into a small child.
- Mirai Iwaki — A popular and attractive boy at school.
- Go Fujinaga — A boy who loves animals and is attracted to Ponta.
- Yuka Koizumi — The granddaughter of the transformation bone's creator, Grandfather Koizumi. Yuka initially has a crush on Mirai, but later finds a different boyfriend, and becomes a more minor character.
- Soichiro Koizumi — Brother to Yuka, who does not feature significantly after volume 1.
- Grandfather Ji Koizumi — Creator of the transformation bone, headteacher of the school attended by the children, and teacher of Ponta.
- Hana Yamaguchi — Mirai's manipulative ex-girlfriend. She is very suspicious of Ponta, and wants to defeat her.

== Release ==
Del Rey licensed Guru Guru Pon-chan for an English-language release in North America and published the volumes from July 26, 2005, to July 31, 2007. In the United Kingdom, Tanoshimi published Guru Guru Pon-chan from August 3, 2006, to August 2, 2007.

=== Volume list ===
No.	Original release date	Original ISBN	North American release date	North American ISBN
01	December 9, 1997	978-4-06-303091-4	July 26, 2005	978-0-345-48095-8
Ponta's owner, Grandfather Koizumi, creates a bone that he hopes will make dogs able to speak. However, his invention also transforms them into human form. Ponta, in human form, falls for Mirai, a local teenage heartthrob, almost instantly. Mirai discovers the secret of Ponta's transformation, and becomes her social tutor. As time goes by he begins to return her feelings, despite his own misgivings about Ponta originally being a dog. However, Ponta's other owner, Yuka, also has feelings for Mirai, leaving Ponta with a moral dilemma.
02	September 9, 1998	978-4-06-303125-6	October 25, 2005	978-0-345-48096-5
Ponta is picked up by the dog pound on Christmas Eve. New student Fujinaga falls for the human Ponta, seeing her as his ideal girl. Ponta has remained ignorant of many of the human world's more complex issues, such as the need for money. When Ponta breaks a valuable vase, Mirai has to find the money to replace it. Ponta tries to help raise money, but mistakenly takes a job as an escort.
03	October 9, 1998	978-4-06-303129-4	January 31, 2006	978-0-345-48141-2
Mirai's ex-girlfriend returns to revive her former relationship with Mirai, despite the fact that he is seeing Ponta. Ponta and Mirai go on a class trip into the woods, but when Mirai is injured looking for her, Hana accuses Ponta of being a terrible girlfriend.
04	March 9, 1999	978-4-06-303146-1	April 25, 2006	978-0-345-48097-2
Ponta and Hana's love rivalry over Mirai continues. Trying to ease tensions, Mirai takes Ponta to the beach, but they end up arguing again. Ponta runs away, believing that it is better for her to live as a dog, to avoid heartbreak over Mirai, leading her family to search for her.
05	July 9, 1999	978-4-06-303161-4	July 25, 2006	978-0-345-48142-9
Ponta has an out of body experience, not only visiting Mirai, but possessing Hana. Ponta is able to tell Mirai via Hana where her body is. Mirai begins to see the further complications of dating a human-canine crossbreed when Ponta goes into heat and is determined to have a baby, despite having no understanding of sexual reproduction.
06	November 10, 1999	978-4-06-303173-7	October 31, 2006	978-0-345-48143-6
Ponta finds herself in trouble as her Guru-Guru bone has started to malfunction, leaving her unable to transform into her human self or talk to Mirai. A beautiful dog owner, Aoka, attempts to steal Mirai away from Ponta.
07	March 9, 2000	978-4-06-303185-0	January 30, 2007	978-0-345-48144-3
Aoka continues to try to win Mirai's heart. Aoka's dog Gang is attracted to Ponta and won't take no for an answer. Ponta is placed in peril when Aoka decides that the best way into Mirai's heart is through breeding Gang and Ponta.
08	August 5, 2000	978-4-06-341203-1	May 1, 2007	978-0-345-48145-0
Mirai has a learning experience when he himself spends some time as a dog. Mirai and Ponta further discover that there are some terrible repercussions from using the transformation bone.
09	November 10, 2000	978-4-06-341213-0	July 31, 2007	978-0-345-48146-7
With Ponta in danger of dying, Mirai has the difficult choice of whether to leave Ponta as a dog or to let her live a shorter life as a human.
