= Tanoshimi =

British publisher of manga

- Tanoshimi, we love Manga! Logo
- Parent company: Random House
- Status: Defunct
- Founded: 2006
- Country of origin: United Kingdom
- Publication types: Books and manga

Tanoshimi was the United Kingdom arm of US publisher Random House and was responsible for the publication of their English-language manga titles. Its relationship with Random House was the same as Del Rey, which released the same Manga titles for its parent company in the United States.

The company came into existence in June 2006, and has since released ten new Manga titles and over 50 books into the UK market. Since 2009 Tanoshimi no longer licenses manga volumes for distribution in the United Kingdom. To continue to follow manga volumes previously released by Tanoshimi, imports could be made from Del Rey in the United States. With the closure of Del Rey, ongoing titles (such as Negima) are now being published by Kodansha USA under the Kodansha Comics imprint.

== Titles ==
- Air Gear - (January 2007)
- Basilisk - (August 2006)
- Free Collars Kingdom - (January 2007)
- Ghost Hunt - (August 2006)
- Guru Guru Pon-chan - (August 2006)
- Mamotte! Lollipop - (February 2006)
- Negima!: Magister Negi Magi - (August 2006)
- Othello - (May 2007)
- School Rumble - (January 2006)
- Tsubasa - (August 2006)
- xxxHolic - (August 2006)
