= Katsu Aki =

Japanese manga artist

Katsuaki Nakamura
- Born: 19 September 1961 (age 65); Fukuoka, Japan
- Other name: Katsu Aki
- Occupation: Manga artist
- Known for: Futari Ecchi

Katsuaki Nakamura (中村 克明, Nakamura Katsuaki; born 19 September 1961), pen name Katsu Aki (克・亜樹), is a Japanese manga artist best known for his works The Vision of Escaflowne, Futari Ecchi, and Psychic Academy. Mine Yoshizaki is one of Aki's former assistants.

== List of works ==
=== Manga creations ===
The following is a list of Katsu Aki's works, both major and minor, since his debut:

- Happy Chokuzen (はっぴぃ直前, Happī Chokuzen)
- Hoshikuzu Paradise (星くずパラダイス, Hoshikuzu Paradaisu)
  After his mother died, high school student Hiroshi Houjou's long lost father suddenly reappears, with two new family members: a new mother who's also a famous actress, and her daughter, the popular and beautiful idol singer Rina Yuuki. Adapted to OAV
- Chouryuu Senki Sauros Knight (超龍戦記ザウロスナイト, Chōryū Senki Zaurosu Naito)
- This is Eden (こちらはエデン, Kochira wa Eden)
- Dynamite Peach (ダイナマイトピーチ, Dainamaito Pīchi)
- Angel Hard (エンジェル・ハード, Enjeru Hādo)
- The Vision of Escaflowne (天空のエスカフローネ, Tenkū no Esukafurōne; lit. Escaflowne of the Heavens)
  Hitomi Hoshino, a 16-year-old high school student with an interest in mysticism, experiences strange dreams at night. A mysterious temple. a tremendous jewel, a shadowy prince... the images trouble her, and a strange incantation keeps echoing in her mind. One day - during a simple fortune telling at school - Hitomi feels a magical pull, and in a shocking moment she is pulled from her body. She wakes up in a strange world where the Earth hangs in the sky and a headstrong prince asks her to power his god, the deity Escaflowne. Loosely based on the TV series.
- Futari Ecchi (ふたりエッチ; trans. Step Up Love Story)
  Makoto and Yura are two 25-year-old virgins who get married. We follow the comedic adventures and mishaps of their attempts at learning how to have sex as influenced by each other, other peoples' experiences, and the media. Adapted to OAV
- Aya
  After his fiancée, Aya, dies in a car accident, Keisuke meets her 3 sisters, who not only look exactly like Aya but are all named Aya as well.
- Psychic Academy (サイキックアカデミー煌羅万象, Saikikku Akademī Ōra Banshō)
  The Psychic Academy is a school for students who have "aura ability." These people can use certain elements (i.e. fire, water, earth) depending on their aura. Shiomi Ai is a new student, unsure of his ability, which has yet to reveal itself. He hopes to reunite with his childhood friend/crush Orina but once there, he meets Mew, a powerful aura user who doesn't like to talk. "Psychic Academy" follows Shiomi's relationships between Orina and Mew while he tries to figure out his place in the aura world. Adapted to ONA
- Harem Revolution (ハーレム革命, Hāremu Kakumei)
- Love Lucky (ラブ♡らっきぃ, Rabu Rakkī)
  Futa Kinashi is a single, average salaryman who has always had terrible luck with women. After being set up and cheated by two girls, he looks for help from a marriage arrangement agency. At a party held by the agency, he meets a strange girl wearing sunglasses and a mask asking him for a date. Accepting her explanation that she's painfully shy, Fuuta decides to go through with the date as planned. Slowly he finds himself falling for this mystery girl's sweet and shy demeanor, despite the fact that she insists on wearing a different disguise each time they meet. Ultimately deciding that her looks don't matter, the two of them get married. On their first night together, she finally removes her mask and reveals her true identity: Kirari, a beautiful and famous pop idol (and Futa is her biggest fan), who has a secret wish: to get married with a man who doesn't love her beauty, money, or fame—but her true self (which is why she hid her face). Unfortunately, there is a catch: the marriage must be kept secret from the world for one full year in order for Kirari's record company to accept it... and if anyone discovers their relationship before then, they will be forced to get a divorce. Fuuta decides that no price is too high to pay for true love, and so the newlyweds swear that they will do whatever it takes to stay together.
- Daddy Virgin (DADDY★バージン, Dadī Bājin; Short stories collection)
