= Takeaki Momose =

Japanese manga artist (born 1970)

- Born: November 18, 1970 (age 55)
- Occupation: Manga artist
- Website: Official website

Takeaki Momose (百瀬武昭, Momose Takeaki; born November 18, 1970) is a Japanese manga artist best known for his series, Miami Guns. Momose is also known for adapting RahXephon into a manga.

== Works ==
These Japanese comics have been drawn by Takeaki Momose:

- Miami Guns
- RahXephon (loosely based on a story by Yutaka Izubuchi/BONES)
- Magikano
- Kami Sen
- Nisemono Tenshi
- Matome x Saito!
