= List of Yozakura Quartet chapters =

The following is a list of manga publications of the series Yozakura Quartet, consisting of thirty-two tankōbon volumes. The series revolves around the members of the Hiizumi Life Counseling Office, Akina Hiizumi, a human that can use "tuning" to return yōkai to their world; Hime Yarizakura, a dragon yōkai who is the mayor of the town of Sakurashin; Ao Nanami, a satori with telepathic abilities; and Kotoha Isone, a half-human, half-yōkai who can conjure objects with her words. Together, they protect the townspeople of Sakurashin, a city where humans and yōkai coexist with one another.

All thirty-two volumes of the manga are published in Japan by Kodansha. The series was originally licensed in North America by Del Rey Manga, who published the first five volumes between February 2008 and September 2009. The company later shut down in 2010, and while most of its titles were picked up for continued publication by Kodansha USA, Yozakura Quartet was not one of them. As a result, the Del Rey publication is now out of print.

Starting in August 2016, Kodansha revived publication of the manga in English as a digital-only series.

== Volumes ==
No.	Original release date	Original ISBN	English release date	English ISBN
1	September 22, 2006	978-4-06-373042-5	February 26, 2008 (Del Rey); August 2, 2016 (Kodansha USA)	978-0345501493
1. "Sakura Blossoming"; 2. "Waiting for You (Part 1)"; 3. "Waiting for You (Part 2)"; 4. "Face the Risks"; 5. "Your Song"
2	March 23, 2007	978-4-06-373063-0	May 20, 2008 (Del Rey); August 23, 2016 (Kodansha USA)	978-0345504104
6. "Moving Forward (Part 1)"; 7. "Moving Forward (Part 2)"; 8. "Moving Forward (Part 3)"; 9. "Your Name Is"; 10. "Cherish the Moment"; 11. "Thorny Road (Part 1)"
3	September 21, 2007	978-4-06-373087-6	November 25, 2008 (Del Rey); September 20, 2016 (Kodansha USA)	978-0345506795
12. "Thorny Road (Part 2)"; 13. "Thorny Road (Part 3)"; 14. "Thorny Road (Part 4)"; 15. "Thorny Road (Part 5)"; 16. "Thorny Road (Part 6)"; 17. "Thorny Road (Part 7)"
4	April 23, 2008	978-4-06-373111-8	April 28, 2009 (Del Rey); October 4, 2016 (Kodansha USA)	978-0345510310
18. "Thorny Path 8"; 19. "Thorny Path 9"; 20. "Thorny Path 10"; 21. "Dogwood 1"; 22. "Dogwood 2"
5	August 22, 2008	978-4-06-373126-2	September 29, 2009 (Del Rey); October 18, 2016 (Kodansha USA)	978-0345516343
23. "To Hold"; 24. "God of the Town"; 25. "Overlapping"; 26. "Sea of Stars 1"; 27. "Sea of Stars 2"
6	December 22, 2008	978-4-06-373146-0; 978-4-06-362130-3 (LE)	November 22, 2016	9781682334690
28. "Sea Of Stars (Part 3)"; 29. "Sea Of Stars (Part 4)"; 30. "Sea Of Stars (Part 5)"; 31. "Sea Of Stars (Part 6)"; 32. "Sea Of Stars (Part 7)"; 33. "Sea Of Stars (Part 8)"
7	September 23, 2009	978-4-06-373184-2	December 20, 2016	9781682334706
34. "Sea Of Stars (Epilogue)"; 35. "Round And Round (Part 1)"; 36. "Round And Round (Part 2)"; 37. "Round And Round (Part 3)"; 38. "Round And Round (Part 4)"; 39. "Round And Round (End)"
8	April 23, 2010	978-4-06-376218-1; 978-4-06-362162-4 (LE)	February 21, 2017	9781682334713
40. "One Of Six (Part 1)"; 41. "One Of Six (Part 2)"; 42. "One Of Six (Part 3)"; 43. "One Of Six (Epilogue)"; 44. "Song Of Flowers (Part 1)
9	October 8, 2010	978-4-06-376239-6	April 18, 2017	9781682336311
45. "Song Of Flowers (Part 2)"; 46. "Song Of Flowers (Part 3)"; 47. "Song Of Flowers (Part 4)"; 48. "Song Of Flowers (Part 5)"; 49. "Song Of Flowers (Part 6)"; 50. "Song Of Flowers (Epilogue)"
10	April 8, 2011	978-4-06-376264-8; 978-4-06-358338-0 (LE)	May 2, 2017	9781682336458
51. "Two Each Their Own (Part One)"; 52. "Two Each Their Own (Part Two)"; 53. "Two Each Their Own (Epilogue)"; 54. "Coming Summer (Part One)"; 55. "Coming Summer (Part Two)"; 56. "Coming Summer (Epilogue)"
11	November 9, 2011	978-4-06-376305-8	May 16, 2017	9781682336465
57. "The Mountain Pass Town"; 58. "Crying In The Moonlight (Part One)"; 59. "Crying In The Moonlight (Part Two)"; 60. "Crying In The Moonlight (Part Three)"; 61. "Crying In The Moonlight (Part Four)"; 62. "Crying In The Moonlight (Epilogue)"
12	August 9, 2012	978-4-06-376339-3	May 30, 2017	9781682336472
63. "Story (Part One)"; 64. "Story (Part Two)"; 65. "Story (Part Three)"; 66. "Story (Part Four)"; 67. "Story (Part Five)"; 68. "Story (Epilogue)"
13	April 9, 2013	978-4-06-376392-8; 978-4-06-362242-3 (LE)	June 13, 2017	9781682336649
69. "Oni Tale (Part One)"; 70. "Oni Tale (Part Two)"; 71. "Oni Tale (Part Three)"; 72. "Oni Tale (Part Four)"; 73. "Story (Epilogue)"
14	October 9, 2013	978-4-06-376416-1; 978-4-06-358447-9 (LE)	June 27, 2017	9781682337080
74. "Approaching Summer"; 75. "Approaching Moment (Part One)"; 76. "Approaching Moment (Part Two)"; 77. "Approaching Moment (Part Three)"; 78. "Approaching Moment (Epilogue)"; 79. "Blue Sky (Before)"
15	February 7, 2014	978-4-06-376443-7; 978-4-06-358473-8 (LE)	July 11, 2017	9781682337714
80. "Blue Sky (After)"; 81. "Parting Paths"; 82. "Kotonodama (Part One)"; 83. "Kotonodama (Part Three)"; 84. "Kotonodama (Part Four)"; 85. "Kotonodama (Part Five)"
16	November 7, 2014	978-4-06-376506-9; 978-4-06-358474-5 (LE)	September 7, 2017	9781682338667
86. "Kotonodama (Part Six)"; 87. "Kotonodama (Part Seven)"; 88. "Kotonodama (Part Eight)"; 89. "Kotonodama (Part Nine)"; 90. "Kotonodama (Part Ten)"; 91. "Kotonodama (Epilogue)"
17	August 7, 2015	978-4-06-376562-5; 978-4-06-358770-8 (LE)	October 3, 2017	9781682338674
93. "Past and Present (Part One)"; 94. "Past and Present (Part Two)"; 95. "Past and Present (Part Epilogue)"; 96. "Girls"; 97. "Boys"; 98. "Pledging Flower"; 99. "Countryside Kids"
18	March 9, 2016	978-4-06-390608-0; 978-4-06-358800-2 (LE)	November 7, 2017	9781682338681
100. "Sandstorm"; 101. "Snowstorm"; 102. "House of Gods (Part One)"; 103. "House of Gods (Part Two)"; 104. "House of Gods (Part Three)"; 105. "House of Gods (Epilogue)"
19	September 9, 2016	978-4-06-390647-9; 978-4-06-358835-4 (LE)	December 5, 2017	9781642120424
107. "Birds Take Flight (Part One)"; 108. "Birds Take Flight (Part Two)"; 109. "Birds Take Flight (Part Three)"; 110. "Birds Take Flight (Part Four)"; 111. "Birds Take Flight (Part Five)"; 112. "Birds Take Flight (Epilogue)"
20	April 7, 2017	978-4-06-390699-8; 978-4-06-358848-4 (LE)	February 6, 2018	9781642121261
113. "Sea-Woman (Part One)"; 114. "Sea-Woman (Part Two)"; 115. "Sea-Woman (Part Three)"; 116. "Sea-Woman (Part Four)"; 117. "Sea-Woman (Part Five)"; 118. "Sea-Woman (Part Six)"; 119. "Sea-Woman (Epilogue)"
21	December 8, 2017	978-4-06-510491-0; 978-4-06-510438-5 (LE)	April 3, 2018	9781642122091
120. "The Eastern Sea Circuit"; 121. "Tomokazuki (Part One)"; 122. "Tomokazuki (Part Two)"; 123. "Tomokazuki (Part Three)"; 124. "Tomokazuki (Epilogue)"
22	August 9, 2018	978-4-06-512246-4; 978-4-06-512396-6 (LE)	February 5, 2019	9781642126570
125. "Summoning (Part One)"; 126. "Summoning (Part Two)"; 127. "Summoning (Part Three)"; 128. "Summoning (Part Four)"; 129. "Summoning (Epilogue)"; 130. "Sun"
23	November 9, 2018	978-4-06-513322-4; 978-4-06-513919-6 (LE)	April 2, 2019	9781642128093
131. "Revelation (Part One)"; 132. "Revelation (Part Two)"; 133. "Revelation (Part Three)"; 134. "Revelation (Part Four)"; 135. "Revelation (Epilogue)"
24	July 9, 2019	978-4-06-516263-7; 978-4-06-516550-8 (LE)	October 15, 2019	9781646590803
136. "Ise-A-Go (Part One)"; 137. "Ise-A-Go (Part Two)"; 138. "Ise-A-Go (Part Three)"; 139. "Ise-A-Go (Part Four)"; 140. "Ise-A-Go (Part Five)"; 141. "Ise-A-Go (Epilogue)"; 142. "Keelback Steelback"
25	December 9, 2019	978-4-06-517791-4; 978-4-06-518130-0 (LE)	May 19, 2020	9781646593644
143. "Sakura-Ko (Part One)"; 144. "Sakura-Ko (Part Two)"; 145. "Sakura-Ko (Part Three)"; 146. "Sakura-Ko (Part Four)"; 147. "Sakura-Ko (Epilogue)"
26	July 9, 2020	978-4-06-519709-7; 978-4-06-520756-7 (LE)	November 17, 2020	9781646598113
148. "Fleeting Summer (Part One)"; 149. "Fleeting Summer (Part Two)"; 150. "Fleeting Summer (Part Three)"; 151. "Fleeting Summer (Part Four)"; 152. "Fleeting Summer (Epilogue)"
27	December 9, 2020	978-4-06-521522-7; 978-4-06-522035-1 (LE)	April 13, 2021	9781636990491
153. "Offering (Part One)"; 154. "Offering (Part Two)"; 155. "Offering (Part Three)"; 156. "Offering (Part Four)"; 157. "Offering (Epilogue)"
28	September 9, 2021	978-4-06-523686-4; 978-4-06-524990-1 (LE)	January 18, 2022	9781636995656
158. "Resurrection (Part One)"; 159. "Resurrection (Part Two)"; 160. "Resurrection (Part Three)"; 161. "Resurrection (Part Four)"; 162. "Resurrection (Part Five)"; 163. "Resurrection (Epilogue)"
29	June 9, 2022	978-4-06-527995-3; 978-4-06-528234-2 (LE)	November 29, 2022	9781684915644
164. "The Crossing (Part One)"; 165. "The Crossing (Part Two)"; 166. "The Crossing (Part Three)"; 167. "The Crossing (Epilogue)"
30	December 8, 2022	978-4-06-529993-7; 978-4-06-530409-9 (LE)	May 30, 2023	9781684919482
168. "Gods of the People"; 169. "People of the Gods"; 170. "The Eve of Battle"
31	September 8, 2023	978-4-06-531986-4; 978-4-06-533054-8 (LE)	January 30, 2024	9798889333395
171. "Cherry Blossoms Bloom (Part One)"; 172. "Cherry Blossoms Bloom (Part Two)"; 173. "Cherry Blossoms Bloom (Part Three)"
32	August 7, 2024	978-4-06-536505-2; 978-4-06-536862-6 (LE)	February 11, 2025	9798894783123
174. "Cherry Blossoms Bloom (Part Four)"; 175. "Cherry Blossoms Bloom (Part Five)"; 176. "Cherry Blossoms Bloom (Part Six)"; 177. "Cherry Blossoms Bloom (Part Seven)"
33	April 9, 2025	978-4-06-538958-4; 978-4-06-539495-3 (LE)	December 9, 2025	9798894788050
178. "Cherry Blossoms Bloom (Part Eight)"; 179. "Cherry Blossoms Bloom (Part Nine)"; 180. "Cherry Blossoms Bloom (Part Ten)"; 181. "Cherry Blossoms Bloom (Part Eleven)"
34	August 7, 2025	978-4-06-540632-8; 978-4-06-540752-3 (LE)	March 10, 2026	9798898300326
182. "Cherry Blossoms Bloom (Finale)"
