= List of Yozakura Quartet episodes =

The cover of the first DVD compilation released by Pony Canyon on December 17, 2008; the character featured on the cover is Hime Yarizakura

The episodes of the Yozakura Quartet anime are based on the manga series of the same name by Suzuhito Yasuda. They are directed by Kou Matsuo and produced by the animation studio Nomad. The plot of the episodes follows the members of the Hiizumi Life Counseling Office, Akina Hiizumi, a human that can use "tuning" to return yōkai to their world; Hime Yarizakura, a dragon yōkai who is the mayor of the town of Sakurashin; Ao Nanami, a satori with telepathic abilities; and Kotoha Isone, a half-human, half-yōkai who can conjure objects with her words. Together, they protect the townspeople of Sakurashin, a city where humans and yōkai coexist with one another.

The episodes aired from October 2, 2008, to December 18, 2008, on Tokyo Broadcasting System in Japan. Other networks that broadcast the episodes include BS-i, Chubu-Nippon Broadcasting, and Mainichi Broadcasting System. The anime adaptation of the manga was first confirmed in Kodansha's Monthly Shōnen Sirius magazine on March 26, 2008.

Two pieces of theme music are used for the episodes: one opening theme and one closing theme. The opening theme is "Just Tune" by the Japanese rock band Savage Genius, and the closing theme is "Nagareboshi" (ナガレボシ) by J-pop band Round Table. Singles that contain the theme songs and other tracks have been released; the single for "Just Tune" was released on October 16, 2008, and the single for "Nagareboshi" was released on October 22, 2008. A DVD compilation, which contains the first two episodes of the anime, was released on December 17, 2008, by Pony Canyon. Five more DVD compilations, each containing two episodes are slated for release between January 21, 2009, and May 20, 2009.

== Episode list ==
=== 2008 Series ===
No.	Title	Original release date
1	"Cherry Blossoms Bloom"; Transliteration: "Sakura Saku" (Japanese: サクラサク)	October 2, 2008
Due to a recent spree of attacks by an escaped criminal, Hime Yarizakura begins to investigate the occurrences with her assistant, Kyōsuke Kishi. She enlists the help of Akina Hiizumi, Ao Nanami, and Kotoha Isone, who are preparing to welcome a new yōkai resident, Rin Azuma, a jiangshi, into Sakurashin. That evening, Hime confronts the criminal, Kosuke Yoshimura, who is holding Rin hostage, and Kosuke disappears when Hime attacks him. The following day, Kosuke holds V Juri F, a nurse, hostage, and demands that Hime comes to him. Hime does so and with Ao's, Kotoha's, and Kyōsuke's aid, they defeat Kosuke. Rin appears and holds Akina at gunpoint, revealing that Kosuke promised her revenge on the humans that abused her. Akina uses tuning to expel the yōkai from Kosuke's body, and when he offers to bring Rin to his office, she declines, claiming that she hates all humans.
2	"What's Your Name?"; Transliteration: "Kimi no Na wa" (Japanese: キミノナハ)	October 9, 2008
Hime meets with Yūhi Shinatsuhiko, a tochigami, to discuss Rin's status in the city, and they decide to have her attend school and work in the city. Hime assigns Akina to be Rin's caretaker, but she quickly leaves. When she encounters Hime, she asks why Akina is allowed in the city, and Hime claims that Akina's tuning ability is necessary for the city's peace; however, Rin considers tuning murder. Elsewhere, Enjin Hiizumi, a wolf yōkai, attacks one of the Seven Pillars, the spiritual sakura trees that protect the city. Throughout the city, yōkai begin to lose control of their powers, and Hime confronts Akina, who is upset about Rin's belief that tuning is murder. Near Akina's office, Rin begins to lose control of her powers, and Akina uses tuning to expel the yōkai that was possessing her. The following day, a grateful Rin arrives at Akina's office to sell food.
3	"That Decision"; Transliteration: "Sono Kakugo" (Japanese: ソノカクゴ)	October 16, 2008
Hime trains in her dojo with Kyōsuke, and recalls when her grandmother, the previous mayor of the city, died and left the title of mayor to Hime. At Akina's office, Hime starts to raise a dog named Silver, and determined to raise it well, feeds it ramen. After hearing a citizen comment on Hime's focus on raising Silver over her mayoral duties, Akina relates this to Hime, who claims that she can do both without complications. That evening, Silver goes into Akina's office and bites him. Furious, Hime hits Silver and he walks away dejectedly despite Ao's pleas. Enjin encounters Silver after attacking one of the Seven Pillars, and implants a yōkai into him, forcing Hime to fight him. After the yōkai gains control over Silver's body, Akina is forced to use tuning, which releases both Silver's and the yōkai's souls.
4	"Looking Back"; Transliteration: "Furikaeru" (Japanese: フリカエル)	October 23, 2008
Akina and Hime discuss Enjin's possession of Gin Nanami, Ao's brother, with Yūhi, who claims that Gin's soul is likely destroyed. Elsewhere, Enjin realizes that he cannot use his full power because Gin's soul is still present in his body. Ao and Tōka Kishi, Kyōsuke's sister, prepare food for Hime on her business trip. When Akina searches for headphones for Hime, he finds a monkey statue that he won in a yakisoba-eating contest with Gin and Hime. That evening, Enjin attacks the barrier created by the Seven Pillars and passes through it. His associate, Eiji Shinozuka, is confronted by Kotoha, Ao, and Yūhi, who realizes that Shinozuka is a hanyō like Kotoha. Akina confronts Enjin, but is unwilling to use tuning on him after Enjin reveals that Gin's soul is still present in his body. Akina is saved by Yae Shinatsuhiko, Yūhi's sister, and Enjin retreats.
5	"Waiting for You"; Transliteration: "Kimi o Matsu" (Japanese: キミヲマツ)	October 30, 2008
Hime returns from her business trip, and begins to broadcast a song of her own making throughout the city. Meanwhile, Akina meets with the Senior Council, which tells him to disregard that Enjin is in Gin's body. Afterwards, Akina meets with Yae, and tells her to keep his encounter with Enjin a secret. Hime, Ao, Kotoha, Kyōsuke, and Tōka agree to supervise a daycare center, but are unable to control the children until Ao uses her telepathic abilities to play with the children. When Ao reads the mind of Junta, a reclusive child, she accidentally reveals a promise he made with his missing father, and Junta runs away. Distressed, Ao refuses to use her telepathic abilities. Akina and Hime manage to find the boy's father, and Ao apologizes to Junta. As Ao relaxes on one of the Seven Pillars, she sees Enjin hovering in the sky.
6	"Spinning Song"; Transliteration: "Tsumugu Uta" (Japanese: ツムグウタ)	November 6, 2008
Enjin disappears and Ao relates the incident to Akina, who asks him to keep it a secret. Enjin begins to experience pain as Gin's body is resisting him, and he leaves Shinozuka to do what he pleases. Kotoha is planning a trip to Germany and a karaoke party with her friends, and Hime asks her to be her training partner. During the training, Hime pierces Kotoha's airplane ticket to Germany with her spear. Furious, Kotoha conjures a 88 mm gun. Kyōsuke blocks the shot, and Kotoha apologizes to Hime. That evening, Shinozuka kidnaps Kotoha's friends, and lures her to the river. Although Kotoha attempts to fight him, he dodges all of her attacks, and attempts to convince her to join him due to the abuse she received from humans in the past for being a hanyō. Hime arrives, reminding Kotoha that she is a human to the core, and Shinozuka retreats.
7	"Dogwood"; Transliteration: "Hanamizuki" (Japanese: ハナミズキ)	November 13, 2008
The townspeople of Sakurashin begin to prepare for the yearly festival honoring the Seven Pillars, and Akina and Hime, as the representatives of the Hiizumi and Yarizakura families respectively, are the key participants. In the ceremony, Hime carries the Dragon Spear into a shrine around one of the Seven Pillars and prays for the continued safety of the town. Following the ceremony, Akina and Hime join the party at Akina's office, where all the participants become inebriated on the alcoholic yōkai water. That morning, Enjin informs them that he has kidnapped Ao, and Akina, Hime, Kotoha, and Kyōsuke go to the shrine to meet him.
8	"That Time"; Transliteration: "Sono Toki o" (Japanese: ソノトキヲ)	November 20, 2008
Enjin demands that Akina open the entrance to the shrine, and Hime attacks him. Kotoha and Ao begin to fight Shinozuka, who manages to dodge all of Kotoha's attacks. Using the telepathic abilities of Gin's body, Enjin realizes that Hime is unwilling to seriously fight him because he is inhabiting Gin's body and overpowers her. Realizing that Hime cannot defeat Enjin, Yae decides to join the fight, but Mariabelle, Yūhi's assistant, reveals that Yūhi has forbidden her from interfering. Enjin forces Akina to open the entrance to the shrine by holding Hime hostage, and Akina does so. Yae throws one of her swords into Enjin's back, but allows him to enter the shrine, where he starts to force the tree to bloom. To stop the process, Hime uses the Dragon Spear to remove part of the tree.
9	"At the End of the Journey"; Transliteration: "Yukusaki ni" (Japanese: ユクサキニ)	November 27, 2008
Hime meets with the Senior Council, and discovers that one of its members is severely injured, as all of the members of the Senior Council are linked to the Seven Pillars. Meanwhile, several yōkai begin to lose control of their powers. Tōka accidentally uses her oni powers to break a car, and is hospitalized. Kyōsuke confronts Akina, accusing him of lacking the resolve to remedy the situation by using tuning on Enjin. Ao attempts to visit Hime, but finds her furiously training. Enjin recalls the time a member of the Hiizumi clan used tuning on him after he claimed Sakurashin should be a city only for yōkai. Ao confronts Akina and tells Akina that he should use tuning on Enjin regardless of the danger to Gin's soul. The following day, Akina and Hime meet with the Senior Council members, who order them to cut down the Seven Pillars.
10	"Thorny Path"; Transliteration: "Ibara Michi" (Japanese: イバラミチ)	December 4, 2008
The Senior Council reveals that if the Seven Pillars are cut down, the city members will have to flee, but a portal that connects the human world to the yōkai world will not be created. When the townspeople question the decision, Hime is unable to calm them. On her regular rounds throughout the city, she learns that Akina has sent out recommendations to the townspeople to hide in safe locations, and she accuses him of lacking the resolve to defeat Enjin. A pair of giant yōkai attack, and Hime attempts to defeat one of them by herself, but is defeated. Akina, Kyōsuke, and Kotoha defeat both of them, and Hime is hospitalized. Meanwhile, the Seven Pillars start to grow, and Kyōsuke orders that the townspeople abandon the area. In the hospital, Hime tearfully confides to Akina that she is too weak to save the town by herself, and Ao tells her to allow her friends to help her.
11	"In Front of You"; Transliteration: "Kimi no Mae" (Japanese: キミノマエ)	December 11, 2008
Ao and Kotoha take a car and begin to search for the source of the yōkai energy that causes the Seven Pillars to grow, and Akina and Kyōsuke fight the yōkai appearing in the city. Hime attempts to leave the hospital to help, but Juri refuses to allow her to leave, citing her injuries. When she awakens later, Jinroku, an elderly citizen, gives her the head of the previous generation's Dragon Spear. As she leaves the hospital, she finds several townspeople who tell her that they want to fight the invading yōkai to save the town. Ao and Kotoha are nearly overwhelmed by the yōkai shadows appearing around them, but Yae saves them. Akina and Kyōsuke encounter Shinozuka and begin to fight him, and they are picked up by Ao and Kotoha, who reveal that the source of the yōkai energy is the tower in the center of the town. Kotoha conjures a railroad gun to attack the tower. Enjin goes to one of the Seven Pillars and forces it to bloom.
12	"Cherry Blossoms Scatter"; Transliteration: "Sakura Mau" (Japanese: サクラマウ)	December 18, 2008
With the Dragon Spear, Hime begins to fight Enjin. When Akina arrives, however, he is still unwilling to use tuning on Enjin. Enjin travels to the meeting place of the Senior Council, and threatens to kill them. Yae arrives to fight him, but Yūhi tells her to allow Hime to fight him. Elsewhere, Kotoha fights Shinozuka, and after he overpowers her, Kyōsuke begins to fight him. After Kotoha distracts Shinozuka, Kyōsuke defeats him by trapping him behind a car. Hime continues to fight Enjin, who manages to cut her scarf using his scythe. In response, Hime uses the full power of the Dragon Spear to blow away all of the sakura petals on the Seven Pillars, and knocks Enjin into Akina, who uses tuning on him. Freed from Enjin, Gin thanks Akina and Hime before his spirit is sent back to the yōkai world. The following day, Akina repairs Hime's scarf and returns it to her.

=== OVA series ===
No.	Title	Original release date
1	"Sea of Stars"; Transliteration: "Hoshi no Umi" (Japanese: ホシノウミ)	October 8, 2010 (Part 1); April 8, 2011 (Part 2); September 9, 2011 (Part 3)
(Takes place between episodes 8 and 9 of Hana no Uta which skips over the events.) Two years after moving to Sakurashin, Rin lives happily with her friends, working at the noodle shop. However, Zakuro, an old acquaintance of hers appears at the city with the intention of taking Rin away and the members of the Hiizumi Life Counseling Office make a stand to protect their friend.
2	"Tears of the Moon"; Transliteration: "Tsuki ni Naku" (Japanese: ツキニナク)	September 9, 2013 (Part 1); February 7, 2014 (Part 2); November 7, 2014 (Part 3)
With the members of the Hiizumi Life Counseling Office away for a trip, its up to the local police to protect a pair of siblings from a werewolf who comes after their lives, intending to sacrifice them in an attempt to obtain immortality.

=== Hana no Uta ===
No.	Title	Original release date
1	"Cherry Blossoms Bloom"; Transliteration: "Sakura Saku" (Japanese: サクラサク)	October 6, 2013
Hime Yarizakura, the mayor of the small town of Sakurashin is assisted by Akina Hiizumi, Ao Nanami and Kotoha Isone from the Hiizumi Life Counseling Office to enforce order and assist the population and together, they end up facing a series of strange incidents when a mysterious enemy arrives at the city.
2	"The Wind of Spring"; Transliteration: "Haru no Kaze" (Japanese: ハルノカゼ)	October 13, 2013
In a city inhabited by youkais and humans, Kotoha is an exception, becoming a half-youkai when she was struck by a mysterious lightning when she was a kid. But when she is struck once again, her powers go out of control and start threatening the city until her friends come to save her.
3	"Moving Forward"; Transliteration: "Susumidasu" (Japanese: ススミダス)	October 20, 2013
The Hiizumi Life Counseling Office is assisted by a pair of Ogre siblings, Kyōsuke and Tōka Kishi, who must control their massive strength to not injury those around them. After an incident with Tōka makes her regret her condition, Kyōsuke lashes his fury at Akina, whom he believes is yet to awaken the power of "Tuning" that runs in his family and could help Tōka, until Akina prove him otherwise.
4	"That Time"; Transliteration: "Sono Toki wo" (Japanese: ソノトキヲ)	October 27, 2013
Kohime Sakurano, a cousin of Hime, intends to run for mayor in a neighboring town and the current mayor Morino comes with an underhanded scheme to prevent it.
5	"Thorny Path, Part 1"; Transliteration: "Ibara Michi 1" (Japanese: イバラミチ 1)	November 3, 2013
Hime and her friends confront an elusive man to rescue Kohime but the situation becomes drastic when they fall under the influence of a barrier that weakens their youkai powers.
6	"Thorny Path, Part 2"; Transliteration: "Ibara Michi 2" (Japanese: イバラミチ 2)	November 10, 2013
With Hime in no condition to fight, Akina and Kyōsuke distract the enemy while the rest of the team look for the source of the barrier to disable it.
7	"Thorny Path, Part 3"; Transliteration: "Ibara Michi 3" (Japanese: イバラミチ 3)	November 17, 2013
With the barrier destroyed and Hime unlocking her true powers, the gang drives the enemy to a corner and rescue Kohime after Morino reforms. However, the man reveals himself to be Enjin Hiizumi, a foe far more dangerous than they believed.
8	"Thorny Path, Conclusion"; Transliteration: "Ibara Michi." (Japanese: イバラミチ。)	November 24, 2013
After the last crisis is averted, peace returns to Sakurashin. However, Enjin is still on the run and plans to enact revenge on the city. Akina and Hime are summoned by the senate to discuss the situation and are angered with their purpose to sacrifice the youkai in the city to stop Enjin's plans. Meanwhile, Zakuro, the first of Enjin's youkai hunters arrive at the city, leading to the events of Hoshi no Umi.
9	"One of Six, Before"; Transliteration: "Roku no Ichi Zen" (Japanese: ロクノイチ 前)	December 1, 2013
Following the events of Hoshi no Umi, Zakuro attempts to adapt herself to her new life as a resident of Sakurashin. While Akina pays a visit to the memorial to his grandfather and all the youkai tuned by the Hiizumi family, he is confronted by Enjin, who attempts to possess his body but is driven away by members of the senate, but little they know that Enjin soon after learns to control the same power they used to defeat him and becomes an even more dangerous threat.
10	"One of Six, After"; Transliteration: "Roku no Ichi Kou" (Japanese: ロクノイチ 後)	December 8, 2013
When Hime catches a cold, her friends keep her company to ensure that she will not overexert herself. Some time later, the mayor pays a visit to the local doctor, V Juri F for a checkup. As Juri reminisces about when she moved to Sakurashin, she is unaware that her younger sister is the next of Enjin's youkai hunters who are preparing to attack the city.
11	"Song of Flowers, Part 1"; Transliteration: "Hana no Uta 1" (Japanese: ハナノウタ 1)	December 15, 2013
Believing that her sister Lila is dead, Juri tells Hime the story of their childhood together. However, when Juri reveals that she has no intention to see her sister if possible, Lila appears and attack them.
12	"Song of Flowers, Part 2"; Transliteration: "Hana no Uta 2" (Japanese: ハナノウタ 2)	December 22, 2013
Lila restrains Juri and threatens to kill Hime, while her friends arrive to help them. Certain that Enjin is plotting something else, Akina starts looking for him while Juri and the others attempt to dissuade her sister.
13	"Song of Flowers, Part 3"; Transliteration: "Hana no Uta 3" (Japanese: ハナノウタ3)	December 29, 2013
While Juri reconcile with her sister, Akina confronts Enjin, and learns the true reason for his grudge on the city and gets himself in a pinch when the enemy shows a glimpse of his true powers.
