= Hamachi =

Hamachi may refer to:

- Hamachi (fish), a Japanese amberjack or buri /yellowtail commonly used in sushi
- LogMeIn Hamachi, a virtual private network (VPN) application
- Hamachi, a fictional character in the manga Yōkaiden
- My Youth Romantic Comedy Is Wrong, As I Expected, a light novel series also known as Hamachi (はまち)
