= List of Fairy Tail chapters (volumes 46–63) =

The cover of the forty-sixth volume of Fairy Tail as published by Kodansha on November 17, 2014, in Japan

Fairy Tail is a Japanese manga series written and illustrated by Hiro Mashima that has been translated into various languages and spawned a substantial media franchise. The series follows the adventures of the dragon-slayer Natsu Dragneel, as he is searching for the dragon Igneel and partners with seventeen-year-old celestial wizard Lucy Heartfilia, who joins the titular guild. In Japan, the series has been published by Kodansha in Weekly Shōnen Magazine since the magazine's issue of August 23, 2006, and in tankōbon format since December 15, 2006. The series spans over 545 chapters and 63 volumes. Hiro Mashima has announced in his notes in the release of volume 61 that the Fairy Tail manga series is set to end with volume 63 being the final release for the main series.

In North America, Kodansha USA and Random House currently serializes Fairy Tail in Crunchyroll Manga simultaneously with Japan. The English-language adaptation was originally published by the now-defunct Del Rey Manga beginning in March 2008. Since then, Kodansha USA and Random House replaced Del Ray with the 13th volume in May 2011, reprinting the earlier 12 volumes under their name, and also publishes them digitally on the IOS, iTunes, Kindle and Nook platforms. In Australia and New Zealand, the English volumes are distributed by Random House Australia. All 63 English volumes have been released.

== Volume list ==
No.	Original release date	Original ISBN	North American release date	North American ISBN
46	November 17, 2014	978-4-06-395241-4	January 27, 2015	978-1-61262-797-7
387. "Tartaros Arc, Part Four: Father and Son" (冥府の門(タルタロス)編【四章：父と子】, Tarutarosu-hen (Yonshō: Chichi to Ko)); 388. "Erza vs. Minerva" (エルザ vs. ミネルバ, Eruza vs. Mineruba); 389. "The Twin Dragons vs. the Underworld King" (双竜 vs. 冥王, Sōryū vs. Meiō); 390. "A Young Boy's Story" (少年の物語, Shōnen no Monogatari); 391. "Gray vs. Silver" (グレイ vs. シルバー, Gurei vs. Shirubā); 392. "Never Forget" (忘れちゃいけない, Wasurecha Ikenai); 393. "Silver Memories" (銀色の想い, Gin'iro no Omoi); 394. "Juvia vs. Keyes" (ジュビア vs. キース, Jubia vs. Kīsu)
Wendy Marvell and her friends discover that Face consists of several thousand other bombs situated across Fiore. Erza Scarlet duels Minerva Orland, who has been transformed into a demon of Tartaros, but both stop after realizing the pointlessness of their fighting. Following a note sent by Erza earlier, Sting Eucliffe and Rogue Cheney arrive and rescue the two from Mard Geer. Meanwhile, Gray Fullbuster is drawn into a private confrontation with Silver, whom he recognizes as his father previously killed by the demon Deliora. The demon slayer says that he is actually Deliora possessing Silver's corpse, enraging Gray. After gravely injuring him, Gray realizes that Silver really is his undead father and refuses to kill him. Unable to cope with his existence, Silver telepathically requests Juvia Lockser to mercifully kill him by destroying Keyes, the necromancer demon controlling him. Juvia reluctantly complies, preventing Keyes from using Crawford's body to remotely detonate Face. Before fading away, Silver bestows his demon-slaying powers onto Gray, who vows to destroy E.N.D.
47	January 16, 2015	978-4-06-395-287-2	March 31, 2015	978-1-61262-798-4
395. "Tartaros Arc, Part Five: Ultimate Pain" (冥府の門(タルタロス)編【五章：究極の痛み】, Tarutarosu-hen (Goshō: Kyūkoku no Itami)); 396. "Air"; 397. "Steel" (鋼, Hagane); 398. "The Final Duels" (最後の一騎討ち, Saigo no Ikkiuchi); 399. "Wings of Despair" (絶望の翼, Zetsubō no Tsubasa); 400. "Wings of Hope" (希望の翼, Kibō no Tsubasa); 401. "Igneel vs. Acnologia" (イグニール vs. アクノロギア, Igunīru vs. Akunorogia); 402. "The Fire Dragon's Iron Fist" (火竜の鉄拳, Karyū no Tekken); 403. "Erza vs. Kyôka" (エルザ vs. キョウカ, Eruza vs. Kyōka)
Demon Gate member Torafuzar floods the entire area with poisonous water to kill all the Fairy Tail wizards at once. Gajeel Redfox struggles to fight Torafuzar underwater, but Levy McGarden uses her magic to provide air, allowing him to refurbish his iron body into steel in the carbon-rich water and cut through the demon's defenses. Gray returns and freezes Tempester with his new demon slayer magic, providing a blood sample for Porlyusica to make an antidote for Laxus Dreyar and the Raijin Trie. Guided by Franmalth, Erza and Minerva reach Tartaros's control room to find Seilah using the last of her power to activate Face's countdown with Crawford Theme's corpse. As Erza duels Kyôka, Acnologia appears and prepares to obliterate both guilds. Suddenly, Igneel emerges from Natsu Dragneel's body to battle Acnologia, revealing that he had been sealed within the Dragon Slayer all along. Igneel tells Natsu to retrieve E.N.D.'s book from Mard Geer, to which Natsu agrees in exchange for an explanation for Igneel's disappearance.
48	March 17, 2015	978-4-06-395343-5	May 26, 2015	978-1-61262-819-6
404. "00:00"; 405. "Tartaros Arc, Part Six: Magna Carta" (冥府の門(タルタロス)編【六章：マグナ・カルタ】, Tarutarosu-hen (Rosshō: Maguna Karuta)); 406. "The Girl in the Crystal" (水晶の中の少女, Suishō no Naka no Shojō); 407. "To Destroy My Very Body" (我が身を滅ぼす為に, Wagami o Horobosu Tame ni); 408. "The Definitive Demon" (絶対の悪魔, Zettai no Akuma); 409. "Thread of White and Black" (白と黒の楔, Shiro to Kuro no Kusabi); 410. "Memento Mori" (メメント・モリ); 411. "To Respond in Kind" (魚心あれば水心, Uogokoro Areba Mizugokoro); 412. "Soaring in Ishgal" (イシュガルに舞う, Ishugaru ni Mau)
Kyôka merges with Face's control mechanism to hasten the bombs detonation. Although Erza defeats her after an arduous battle, the detonation process begins. During events concurrent with Erza and Kyôka's battle, Makarov Dreyar hesitates to use Lumen Histoire, revealed to be Mavis Vermillion's body preserved in crystal. Meanwhile, Natsu battles Mard Geer over E.N.D.'s book, reluctantly accepting Sting, Rogue, and Gray's help to fight him. Mard Geer summons Saber Tooth's former master Ziemma to kill them and assumes his true, demonic form as Mard Geer Tartaros. Sting and Rogue defeat Ziemma while Gray partially turns himself into a demon to protect Natsu from Mard Geer's ultimate curse designed to kill Zeref, and then defeats the demon while Natsu distracts him. With Face near detonation, the dragons Grandeeney, Metalicana, Weisslogia, and Skiadram appear and destroy all of the bombs positioned across Fiore, finally thwarting Tartaros's plans.
49	May 15, 2015	978-4-06-395406-7	July 28, 2015	978-1-61262-985-8
413. "The Tome of END" (ENDの書, Ī Enu Dī no Sho); 414. "Drops of Fire" (炎の雫, Honō no Shizuku); 415. "That Is the Power of Life" (それが生きる力だ, Sore ga Ikiru Chikara da); 416. "Tartaros Arc, Final Part" (冥府の門(タルタロス)編【終章】, Tarutarosu-hen (Shūshō)); 417. "Lone Journey II" (一人旅II, Hitoritabi Tsū); 418. "Challenger" (挑戦者, Chōsen-sha); 419. "Message of Fire" (炎のメッセージ, Honō no Messēji); 420. "Lamia Scale's Thanksgiving Day" (蛇姫の鱗(ラミアスケイル)感謝祭, Ramia Sukeiru Kanshasai)
Igneel tells Natsu to retrieve E.N.D.'s book as he continues to fight Acnologia. Zeref appears and kills Mard Geer for his failure, and then leaves with the book. Natsu runs to help Igneel, only to watch helplessly as Acnologia kills the fire dragon and leaves. Afterward, the other dragons reveal they have lost their souls to Acnologia and sealed themselves within the Dragon Slayers to prolong their own lives. Unable to seal themselves back, the dragons ascend to continue watching over mankind from a higher plane of existence, while Natsu vows to defeat Acnologia and avenge Igneel. As the Fairy Tail members recover from the battle over the next week, Natsu and Happy embark on a journey to train in preparation for their battle with Acnologia; shortly afterward, Makarov announces Fairy Tail's imminent dissolution, and the guild members go their separate ways. One year later, Natsu and Happy reunite with Lucy Heartfilia at the Grand Magic Games. Upon discovering Fairy Tail's fate, the two set out with Lucy to reorganize the guild. They first visit the Lamia Scale guild, which Wendy and Carla have joined.
50	July 17, 2015	978-4-06-395435-7	September 29, 2015	978-1-61262-986-5
421. "Wendy and Sherria" (ウェンディとシェリア, Wendi to Sheria); 422. "Orochi's Fin" (蛇鬼の鰭(オロチノフィン), Orochi no Fin); 423. "Do It All for Love" (愛してるから, Aishiteru kara); 424. "Avatar" (黒魔術教団(アヴァタール), Avatāru); 425. "Saber Tooth X792" (剣咬の虎(セイバートゥース) X792, Seibā Tūsu Nana-hyaku Kyūjū-ni); 426. "Black Heart" (黒い心, Kuroi Kokoro); 427. "Pitched Underground Battle" (地下の激闘, Chika no Gekitō); 428. "When We Take Different Paths" (道が違うなら, Michi ga Chigau nara); 429. "Code Blue" (コードブルー, Kōdo Burū)
Wendy declines Natsu's invitation to revive Fairy Tail, wishing to keep her friend Sherria Blendy company in the absence of her cousin, Sherry. After Natsu helps Lamia Scale thwart an attack by rival guild Orochi's Fin, led by former Grimoire Heart commander Blue Note Stinger, Sherria convinces Wendy to rejoin her old friends. Next, the group visits an abandoned village where Gray and Juvia have been living together until Gray's disappearance. Remembering Future Rogue's warning that Gray will kill Frosch, Natsu discovers that Gray has joined Avatar, a cult of Zeref's worshipers, in search of E.N.D.'s book. After diverting Rogue from the cult to protect Frosch, Natsu, Lucy, and Happy reach Avatar's base to find that Gray has seemingly been corrupted by his demon slayer magic. When the three are captured and overpowered by Avatar's elites, Gray rescues them and reveals he and Erza have been spying on the cult together.
51	September 17, 2015	978-4-06-395489-0	November 24, 2015	978-1-63236-114-1
430. "Operation Purify" (浄化作戦, Jōka Sakusen); 431. "My Sword" (我が剣は…, Waga Ken wa...); 432. "Briar in Love" (恋するブライヤ, Koisuru Buraiya); 433. "Ikusa-Tsunagi" (イクサツナギ); 434. "Hôken" (崩拳; lit. 'Demolishing Strike'); 435. "Cry of Victory" (勝鬨, Kachidoki); 436. "Memoirs" (回想録, Kaisōroku); 437. "Magnolia" (マグノリア, Magunoria); 438. "The Seventh Guild Master" (七代目ギルドマスター, Nanadaime Girudo Masutā)
Natsu, Lucy, Gray, and Erza launch an assault on Avatar and defeat the cult's elites with Wendy, Carla and Juvia's assistance. The cult's priest Alok summons the war god Ikusa-Tsunagi to sacrifice his own followers for Zeref, but Natsu uses the immense strength he has gained from his training to destroy the deity. Gajeel, Panther Lily, and Levy arrive as officers of the Magic Council to arrest Avatar's remaining members. In a flashback, a young Zeref resurrects his dead infant brother Natsu, whose body is used to create E.N.D. to kill Zeref and end his immortality curse inflicted by the god Ankhselam. Back in the present, Zeref issues a challenge to Acnologia. Later, Lucy's friends reunite her with the rest of Fairy Tail at the remains of their guildhall. When Erza is instated as guild master in Makarov's absence to officiate Fairy Tail's revival, Doranbalt—discovered to be a formerly amnesiac member of Fairy Tail named Mest Gryder—appears at the guild with word of Makarov's whereabouts.
52	November 17, 2015	978-4-06-395538-5	January 26, 2016	978-1-63236-115-8
439. "The Albareth Empire" (アルバレス帝国, Arubaresu Teikoku); 440. "God Serena" (ゴッドセレナ, Goddo Serena); 441. "Caracol Island" (カラコール島, Karakōru-tō); 442. "Rules of the Area" (空間の掟, Kūkan no Okite); 443. "And the Land Just Vanished" (そして大地が消え去った, Soshite Daichi ga Kiesatta); 444. "Emperor Spriggan" (皇帝スプリガン, Kōtei Supurigan); 445. "The Grotesque Fairy" (醜い妖精, Minikui Yōsei); 446. "The Land the Gods Abandoned" (神に見捨てられた地, Kami ni Misuterareta Chi)
Fairy Tail learns from Mest that Makarov has traveled to negotiate peace with the Alvarez Empire, a military nation that dwarfs Ishgal. Having not heard back from Makarov since Fairy Tail's dissolution, Natsu and his friends organize a rescue team and head towards the empire. They are impeded by Brandish μ, one of Emperor Spriggan's elite Spriggan 12 bodyguard unit that rival the power of Ishgal's strongest Wizard Saint, God Serena, who has defected to join the twelve. Fairy Tail manages to reach the empire aboard a submarine captained by Crime Sorcière member Sorano Agria (formerly Oración Seis' Angel). Meanwhile, Spriggan returns after a long absence and is revealed to be Zeref, who divulges with Makarov his desire to claim Lumen Histoire. Zeref prepares to kill Makarov, but Mest uses his teleportation powers to save the master. Fairy Tail then flees with Makarov from Ajeel Raml, another of the Spriggan 12.
53	January 15, 2016	978-4-06-395577-4	April 12, 2016	978-1-63236-126-4
447. "The Fight to Flee" (脱出戦, Dasshutsusen); 448. "Fight the Power!"; 449. "Mavis and Zeref" (メイビスとゼレフ, Meibisu to Zerefu); 450. "The Only One in All the World" (世界で ただ一人, Sekai de, Tada Hitori); 451. "Fairy Heart" (妖精の心臓(フェアリーハート), Fearī Hāto); 452. "Prelude to the Final Battle" (最終決戦の序曲, Saishū Kessen no Jokyoku); 453. "A Father's Job" (親のつとめ, Oya no Tsutome); 454. "Dragon Flight Force and Osprey Force" (飛竜隊とミサゴ隊, Hiryū-tai to Misago-tai); 455. "Defending Magnolia" (マグノリア防衛戦, Magunoria Bōeisen)
Cornered by Ajeel, the Fairy Tail wizards are rescued by the arrival of Laxus on Blue Pegasus's airship, the Christina. They return to Ishgal and reinstate Makarov as their master. Makarov and Mavis explain to the guild that Zeref's target, Lumen Histoire, is a wellspring of infinite magic energy known as Fairy Heart. In a flashback, a young Mavis encounters Zeref and becomes cursed with the same immortality and life-stealing powers as the dark wizard. The two fall in love over their mutual sympathy for each other, but Zeref sends Mavis into a state between life and death because his curse kills those he cherishes, yet cannot kill an immortal. Mavis's state of being produces Fairy Heart, which Zeref intends to use against Acnologia. Back in the present, Fairy Tail prepares for Alvarez's assault. The wizards manage to hold off the empire's first strike headed by Ajeel, but despair when they discover their enemy's forces are approaching them in all directions.
54	March 17, 2016	978-4-06-395626-9	June 21, 2016	978-1-63236-215-5
456. "Orders" (命令, Meirei); 457. "Naked Battle" (BATTLE OF NAKED); 458. "Morning Star" (明星, Myōjō); 459. "Weakness" (ウィークネス, Wīkunesu); 460. "The Pegasus That Came to Earth" (舞い降りた天馬, Maiori ta Tenma); 461. "This Perfume Goes To..." (その香り(パルファム)は誰がために, Sono Parufamu wa Ta ga Tame ni); 462. "Battlefield" (バトルフィールド, Batorufīrudo); 463. "Black Carpet" (黒い絨毯, Kuroi Jūtan); 464. "Natsu vs. Zeref" (ナツ vs. ゼレフ, Natsu vs. Zerefu)
Erza defeats Ajeel after overcoming his sandstorm magic. Brandish fights Lucy out of resentment towards her late mother, Layla, but she contracts a pollen allergy in Ajeel's sandstorm. Meanwhile, the guild's defensive barrier is breached by Spriggan 12 member Wall Eehto, a mechanical wizard that exploits their weaknesses. The Raijin Tribe defeats Wall with the aid of Ichiya Vandalay Kotobuki, only to discover their opponent to be a puppet remotely controlled by the real Wall, who fires upon the guild from afar. Ichiya blocks Wall's attack with the Christina and broadcasts a message beckoning the other guilds in Fiore to help Fairy Tail. Natsu moves in for a solo attack on Zeref, using the last vestiges of Igneel's power within himself to fight him.
55	May 17, 2016	978-4-06-395675-7	August 9, 2016	978-1-63236-262-9
465. "400 Years" (400年, Yonhyaku-nen); 466. "Assassin" (暗殺者, Ansatsu-sha); 467. "Mother's Key" (母の鍵, Haha no Kagi); 468. "Star Memory" (星の記憶, Hoshi no Kioku); 469. "What I Want to Do" (あたしのしたい事, Atashi no Shitai Koto); 470. "Hybrid Theory"; 471. "Until the Battle Is Done" (戦いが終わるまでは, Tatakai ga Owaru made wa); 472. "Laxus vs. Wall" (ラクサス vs. ワール, Rakusasu vs. Wāru); 473. "Red Lightning" (赤き雷, Akaki Kaminari)
Zeref reveals himself to Natsu as his brother, informing him of his true identity as E.N.D. and the Dragon Slayers' role in a 400-year-old plan enacted by himself, Igneel, and the Heartfilia family to defeat Acnologia. Natsu ignores these revelations and moves to kill Zeref, but Happy stops him once Zeref reveals that his own death would kill Natsu as well. At the guild, an imprisoned Brandish tries killing Lucy again to avenge her mother Grammi, who was apparently murdered by Layla over Aquarius's key, destroyed by Lucy the previous year. However, Aquarius returns with her key restored and reveals that Zoldio killed Grammi, vindicating Layla. Happy returns to the guild with an unconscious Natsu, whom Porlyusica diagnoses with a tumor from overexerting his magic against Zeref. Having reconciled with Lucy, Brandish uses her mass-altering magic to shrink the tumor to a non-lethal size. East of Magnolia, God Serena advances towards Fairy Tail after defeating his former fellow Wizard Saints with his Dragon Slayer magic, only to be slain by Acnologia, who intends to kill the surviving Dragon Slayers. In Hargeon, Erza leads a team of wizards to assist Lamia Scale and Mermaid Heel in defending the city from Alvarez's forces, with Laxus destroying Wall.
56	July 15, 2016	978-4-06-395715-0	September 27, 2016	978-1-63236-290-2
474. "During Hushed Times" (静かなる時の中で, Shizuka naru Toki no Naka de); 475. "DiMaria Chronos Yesta" (ディマリア・クロノス・イエスタ, Dimaria Kuronosu Iesuta); 476. "Farewell, Magical Girl" (魔法少女にさよならを, Mahō Shōjo ni Sayonara o); 477. "Transport" (トランスポート, Toransupōto); 478. "Stealth" (ステルス, Suterusu); 479. "The One Most Respected" (一番敬うべきは, Ichiban Uyamau Beki wa); 480. "Grave Markers of the North" (北の墓標, Kita no Bohyō); 481. "The Historia of the Dead" (屍のヒストリア, Shikabane no Hisutoria); 482. "Fighting Spirit" (気魄, Kihaku)
Wendy and Sherria team up against DiMaria Yesta, a member of the Spriggan 12 who uses her time-stopping ability to attack the girls. While time is frozen, a magical projection of Ultear Milkovich manifests and unfreezes the girls. After DiMaria reveals herself to be possessing a deity, Sherria amplifies her god-slaying magic with Ultear's Third Origin spell to defeat DiMaria, permanently losing her own magic power as a result. In Magnolia, Spriggan 12 assassin Jacob Lessio infiltrates Fairy Tail's guildhall and, capable of seeing Mavis's spirit, attacks her. Natsu recovers and helps Lucy defeat Jacob to release their trapped allies. In Hargeon, Erza, Kagura, and Jellal join forces against another of the twelve, Neinhart, who pits Fairy Tail and their allies against constructs of their deceased loved ones and enemies. Erza dispatches her revived opponents to her exhaustion, while Kagura overcomes her vendetta against Jellal to save him from drowning.
57	September 16, 2016	978-4-06-395761-7	November 29, 2016	978-1-63236-291-9
483. "Seven Stars" (七つの星, Nanatsu no Hoshi); 484. "The Savage Six" (バケモノ6人, Bakemono Roku-nin); 485. "The First Dinner in Five Days" (五日ぶりの飯, Itsuka Buri no Meshi); 486. "The Fourth Guest" (4人目の客, Yonin-me no Kyaku); 487. "The Third Seal" (第三の印, Dai San no In); 488. "The Two of Us, Forever" (ずっと二人で, Zutto Futari de); 489. "Universe One" (ユニバースワン, Yunibāsu Wan); 490. "Fairy Tail ZERØ" (フェアリーテイル ZERØ, Fearī Teiru Zero); 491. "Mother and Child" (母と子, Haha to Ko)
Jellal and the rest of Fairy Tail's allies defeat Neinhart and his creations, liberating Hargeon. In northern Fiore, Gajeel and his team assist Saber Tooth and Blue Pegasus, who have been wiped out by Bloodman, one of the Spriggan 12. Gajeel and Levy fight Bloodman, who wields the same powers as the demons of Tartaros, and defeat him when Gajeel achieves Dragon Force. Mortally injured, Bloodman drags Gajeel into the underworld. East of Magnolia, Brandish brings Natsu, Lucy, and Happy to negotiate a ceasefire with August, a wizard regarded as the mightiest man of the Spriggan 12. Mest follows, distrustful of Brandish, and alters her memories to make her kill August instead. August responds by nearly annihilating the group in a display of immense magic power, but Natsu helps them survive. Meanwhile, Acnologia is directly confronted by Irene Belserion, August's female counterpart among the twelve. Unable to best Acnologia, Irene casts the forbidden spell Universe One, which condenses the country's size and scatters everyone to random locations, including Acnologia. The spell also inadvertently saves Gajeel, who encounters a projection of Zera, Mavis's late childhood friend, after Cana Alberona releases Mavis from her stasis. Zera telepathically contacts Fairy Tail's members and directs them to their guildhall, where Mavis comes face-to-face with Zeref.
58	November 17, 2016	978-4-06-395804-1	February 28, 2017	978-1-63236-334-3
492. "Older and Younger Sisters" (姉と妹, Ane to Imōto); 493. "White Dragneel" (白きドラグニル, Shiroki Doraguniru); 494. "The Hill That Leads to Tomorrow" (明日へ続く丘, Ashita e Tsuzuku Oka); 495. "I'm Hungry" (腹減ってんだ, Harahettenda); 496. "Forward!!!!" (進め!!!!, Susume!!!!); 497. "The Winter Wizard" (冬の魔導士, Fuyu no Madōshi); 498. "Gray vs. Invel" (グレイ vs. インベル, Gurei vs. Inberu); 499. "Gray and Juvia" (グレイとジュビア, Gurei to Jubia); 500. "Fire and Ice" (炎と氷, Honō to Kōri)
Zeref orders his remaining forces to assemble at the hilltop where Fairy Tail's guildhall now stands. Fairy Tail's members advance through Alvarez's army, assisted by the return of Gildarts Clive, who defeats a replica of God Serena conjured by Neinhart. Brandish takes Natsu, Lucy, and Happy away from the battle, intent on keeping them out of the war. Natsu, however, demonstrates his conviction by defeating an empowered Neinhart. Meanwhile, Gray duels Zeref's chief of staff, Invel Yura, who seeks to use him to remove Natsu as an obstacle to Zeref's plans. He brainwashes Gray and Juvia into fighting each other, intending for Gray to kill her and succumb to his demonic corruption so as to bring about his full potential. Instead, Juvia seemingly stabs herself to death and tranfuses her blood to Gray when he does the same. Grief-stricken, Gray retains his sense of judgment and defeats Invel, unaware as Wendy and Carla arrive in time to nurse Juvia back to life. However, Invel compels Gray to fight Natsu anyway by revealing Natsu's true identity as E.N.D. to him.
59	December 16, 2016	978-4-06-395831-7	March 28, 2017	978-1-63236-335-0
501. "Mari and Randi" (マリーとランディ, Marī to Randi); 502. "Mavis and Zera" (メイビスとゼーラ, Meibisu to Zēra); 503. "The Last Sight Seen" (最後に見た光景, Saigo no Mita Kōkei); 504. "The Gash" (亀裂, Kiretsu); 505. "Trump Card" (切り札, Kirifuda); 506. "The Broken Bond" (壊れた絆を, Kowareta Kizuna o); 507. "Voice" (声, Koe); 508. "Pleasure and Pain" (快楽と苦痛, Kairaku to Kutsū); 509. "Kagura vs. Larcade" (カグラ vs. ラーケイド, Kagura vs. Rākeido)
Brandish returns Natsu's shrunken tumor to its original size and battles Lucy in a bluff attempt at retaining her loyalty to Alvarez. DiMaria, declaring Brandish to be a traitor, wounds her and kidnaps Natsu and Lucy. As DiMaria threatens to torture Lucy, Natsu's tumor triggers his Etherious instincts, sending him on a violent rampage towards Zeref that leaves DiMaria traumatized. Gray, corrupted and blinded by vengeance towards E.N.D., impedes Natsu in a duel to the death. Meanwhile, Invel's defeat allows Mavis to escape the guild undetected. Irene amplifies her footsoldiers' strength to decimate Fairy Tail, forcing Makarov to eliminate them by casting Fairy Law from his remaining lifespan. Mournful over Makarov's death, Erza stops Natsu and Gray's fighting as Lucy and Juvia reveal themselves to be safe. As Irene fights Erza and Wendy, Fairy Tail and their allies are beset by Larcade Dragneel, Zeref's son and one of the Spriggan 12, who defeats Kagura with little effort.
60	March 17, 2017	978-4-06-395897-3	May 30, 2017	978-1-63236-336-7
510. "The Heart of Natsu" (ナツノココロ, Natsu no Kokoro); 511. "The Hell of Hunger" (空腹地獄, Kūfuku Jigoku); 512. "Sting, the White Shadow Dragon" (白影竜のスティング, Hakueiryū no Sutingu); 513. "Hanamaru" (花マル; lit. 'Flower Circle'); 514. "Dragon Seed" (竜の種, Ryū no Tane); 515. "I Am You...You Are Me"; 516. "The Essence of Enchant" (付加(エンチャント)の真理, Enchanto no Shinri); 517. "Wendy Belserion" (ウェンディ・ベルセリオン, Wendi Beruserion); 518. "Master Enchant" (極限付加術(マスターエンチャント), Masutā Enchanto)
Sting defeats Larcade with assistance from Rogue and Kagura. Erza and Wendy battle Irene, who reveals herself as Erza's mother and divulges her history to them. Four centuries in the past, Irene rules a kingdom where humans and dragons coexist in harmony. When war erupts between her kingdom and dragons that devour humans, she uses her powers of enchantment to develop dragon-slaying magic for humans, unintentionally bringing about the near extinction of the dragon race. Later, her use of this magic gradually turns her into a dragon while she is pregnant with Erza. Fleeing into the wilderness after escaping her husband's attempts at executing her, Irene magically forestalls Erza's birth for centuries until she encounters Zeref, who gives her a fabricated human form. However, she cannot adjust to her new body and is driven mad with agony, deciding and failing to enchant herself onto her unborn child's body. Back in the present, Irene momentarily succeeds at taking over Wendy's body, but Wendy does the same with Irene and uses her power to undo the enchantment. Enraged, Irene uses her dragon form conjure a meteor to strike the kingdom in a final effort to kill Erza.
61	May 17, 2017	978-4-06-395945-1	July 25, 2017	978-1-63236-430-2
519. "Show Me Your Smile" (笑顔を見せて, Egao o Misete); 520. "Dragon or Demon" (竜か悪魔か, Ryū ka Akuma ka); 521. "The Strongest Wizard" (最強の魔道士, Saikyō no Madōshi); 522. "Gray's Trump Card" (グレイの切り札, Gurei no Kirifuda); 523. "Is Destiny Going Up in Flames?" (運命は燃えているか, Unmei wa Moeteiru ka); 524. "The Black Future" (黒い未来, Kuroi Mirai); 525. "Why Did the Emperor Never Love His Child?" (なぜ陛下の子は愛されなかったのか, Naze Heika no Ko wa Aisarenakatta no ka); 526. "My Name Is..." (ぼくのなまえは…, Boku no Namae wa...); 527. "Emotion" (情, Jō)
Despite suffering a severe injury from Irene, Erza musters enough strength to obliterate Irene's meteor spell. Irene hesitates to kill Erza as she remembers her decision to spare her daughter's life as an infant. Stricken with grief, Irene commits suicide with Erza's sword. Meanwhile, a comatose Natsu learns from a metaphysical encounter with Igneel that two magical seeds—the tumor-like "demon seed" that triggered his demonic transformation, and a similar "dragon seed" that induces dragonification—have endangered his life. Urged to choose one seed to destroy, Natsu instead asserts his identity as a human and destroys both seeds. Natsu recovers shortly before Irene's spell on Fiore disappears, restoring the country's geography. At the guildhall, a guilt-ridden Gray attempts to freeze Zeref using an enhanced version of Iced Shell that erases all memory of its caster's existence. Natsu stops Gray, reaffirming their friendship, and duels Zeref again. Larcade intervenes to help Zeref, but Zeref ruthlessly denounces his "son" as a demon of his creation and kills him. August—who, unbeknownst to Zeref and Mavis, is their true biological son—prepares to annihilate the country with a suicidal spell after being bested by Gildarts, but halts his attack and perishes upon seeing Mavis. Mavis then delivers the book of E.N.D. to Lucy and Gray, disclosing it as part of her plan to defeat Zeref.
62	September 15, 2017	978-4-06-510034-9	November 14, 2017	978-1-63236-475-3
528. "Dragon of Magic" (魔竜, Maryū); 529. "Teacher" (先生, Sensei); 530. "Neo Eclipse" (ネオ・エクリプス, Neo Ekuripusu); 531. "Pegasus vs. the Black Dragon" (天馬 vs. 黒竜, Tenma vs. Kokuryū); 532. "I Can No Longer See Love" (愛はもう見えない, Ai wa Mō Mienai); 533. "Zeref the White Wizard" (白魔道士ゼレフ, Shiro Madōshi Zerefu); 534. "The Vow of the Doors" (誓いの扉, Chikai no Tobira); 535. "The Greatest Power" (最強の力, Saikyō no Chikara); 536. "Savage Dragon Fire" (荒ぶる竜の炎, Araburu Ryū no Honō)
Acnologia returns to resume his hunt for the Dragon Slayers, demonstrating his ability to devour all forms of magic. Wendy and her companions are rescued by Blue Pegasus and Anna Heartfilia, Lucy's ancestor and the Dragon Slayers' childhood teacher. Anna details a plan to imprison Acnologia within the space between time, an inescapable rift created as a result of using Eclipse to transport herself and the Dragon Slayers to the present era. However, the rift is closed off by Zeref, who intends to combine its power with Fairy Heart to open Neo Eclipse, a portal to a new timeline where he may prevent Acnologia's rise to power, which would also destroy the present timeline. Mavis gets close to Zeref, allowing him to absorb Fairy Heart from her. Lucy, Gray, and Happy reason that they must edit the book of E.N.D. to make Natsu human and ensure his survival without Zeref. Lucy proceeds at the risk of being overtaken by the demonic entity within the book, allowing Natsu to defeat Zeref. With the rift reopened during Natsu's battle, Ichiya and Anna ram Acnologia into it with the Christina, seemingly vanquishing him.
63	November 17, 2017	978-4-06-510390-6	January 23, 2018	978-1-63236-476-0
537. "The Power of Life" (生命の力, Seimei no Chikara); 538. "When the Flame Goes Out" (炎消える時, Honō Kieru Toki); 539. "World Destruction" (世界崩壊, Sekai Hōkai); 540. "Balance" (調和, Chōwa); 541. "The Magic of Hope" (希望の魔法, Kibō no Mahō); 542. "Instinct" (本能, Honnō); 543. "Hearts Connected" (繋がる心, Tsunagaru Kokoro); 544. "You're the King"; 545. "Friends You Can't Do Without" (かけがえのない仲間たち, Kakegae no Nai Nakama-tachi)
Mavis lifts her and Zeref's shared curse by accepting her own love for him, which kills them both; she also resurrects Makarov in the process. Lucy successfully edits the book before it vanishes with Zeref, saving Natsu's life. Meanwhile, Acnologia consumes the magic of the spacetime rift and escapes, releasing Ichiya and Anna as well. The rift's magic separates his human spirit from his body, which begins instinctively destroying Earth-land while his spirit traps the Dragon Slayers into the rift to balance his newfound power. Lucy decides to seal Acnologia's body within Fairy Sphere, luring him to a port in Hargeon where she prepares to cast the spell. Bolstered by the magic of every wizard on the continent via Merudy's sensory link, Lucy successfully immobilizes Acnologia's body and spirit, allowing Natsu to kill him with the Dragon Slayers' combined power, which frees the Dragon Slayers from the rift. One year later, Lucy's friends attend an award ceremony for a novel she has published about her adventures, where they also witness an encounter between two strangers who resemble Mavis and Zeref. Afterwards, Natsu, Lucy, and their friends embark on a "century quest", a guild mission that has never been completed in over one hundred years.
