= Minima! =

Japanese manga series

- Genre: Comedy
- Manga
- Written by: Machiko Sakurai
- Published by: Kodansha
- English publisher: NA: Del Rey Manga
- Magazine: Bessatsu Friend
- Original run: December 13, 2006 – February 13, 2008
- Volumes: 4

Minima! is a Japanese manga series written and illustrated by Machiko Sakurai. It was cancelled in February 2008.

== Manga ==
The manga was licensed for an English-language release in North America by Del Rey Manga. As of February 2009, Del Rey Manga had released 4 bound volumes of the manga.

=== Volume list ===
No.	Original release date	Original ISBN	English release date	English ISBN
1	December 13, 2006	978-4-06-341499-8	February 2008	978-0-345-50182-0
2	March 11, 2007	978-4-06-341525-4	May 2008	978-0-345-50407-4
3	October 12, 2007	978-4-06-341548-3	December 2008	978-0-345-50680-1
4	February 13, 2008	978-4-06-341566-7	August 2009	978-0-345-51072-3

== Reception ==
Mania.com's Nadia Oxford and About.com's Deb Aoki comments on the manga's realistic portrayal of a high school girl who is a victim of bullying. Pop Culture Shock's Katherine Dacey criticises the manga artist's artwork saying that Sakurai "has a limited repertoire of character designs, and a tendency to draw vaguely alien faces with bulging eyes and foreheads." Casey Brienza at Anime News Network commends the manga's ability to seamlessly "shift from human-sized perspectives to toy-sized ones and back again".
