= Shiki Tsukai =

Japanese manga series

- Cover of Volume 2 of the manga

四季使い
- Manga
- Written by: To-Ru Zekuu
- Illustrated by: Yuna Takanagi
- Published by: Kodansha
- English publisher: NA: Del Rey Manga
- Magazine: Monthly Shōnen Sirius
- Original run: July 26, 2005 – September 26, 2011
- Volumes: 13

Shiki Tsukai (四季使い; lit. Four-Seasons User) is an action manga written by To-Ru Zekuu and illustrated by Yuna Takanagi. It is serialized in Kodansha's shōnen manga magazine Monthly Shōnen Sirius, and has been licensed in North America by Del Rey Manga.

== Story ==
Just before his fourteenth birthday, Akira Kizuki discovers that he is a shiki tsukai, a magical warrior with the ability to control the seasons. He is a special one called the "Shinra" He soon finds himself being protected by an attractive humanoid kijyuu named Koyomi. As shiki tsukai, they are keepers of the seasons and defend them against the evil forces that threaten to destroy the delicate balance of the natural order. Now spring and winter Shiki Tsukai fight against summer and fall to protect the human race.

== Terminology ==
Shinra Banshou
The Law of the Universe
Shinra
One who is loved by the seasons and can use all Shikifu in existence and can cease the battles, however the power is too much for Akira to use and winds up controlling him. A forced awakening will cause him to destroy everything.
Shikifu
Cards that embodies the power of the season and month of those who use them, they typically appear in locations with matching temperature. A Shiki Tsukai can only use one corresponding to their birthday. They are created by Kijyuu or given birth by women. One Shikifu can absorb another adding more Sigil dates, making it more powerful, this is called inclusion. The shikifu of the Shinra Banshou can use every incantation.
Sigil Dates
The points on the Shikifu that represent dates, certain ones are needed to cast certain spells. The more dates a card has the more powerful it is.
Shiki Tsukai
Those who can use Shikifu, they are the keepers of the seasons that exist to bring the seasons back to their regular pattern. All men Shiki Tsukai inherit Shikifu, while women can create them. Those who create Shikifu can never give birth and many have been driven insane by it. Shiki Tsukai also age slower than normal humans and live longer, explaining why they look so young, if born on a leap year they only age once in 4 years. They also mentally mature faster than normal humans.
Kijyuu
Kijyuu are born from nature and are an embodiment of nature themselves and protect the earth. They come in multiple forms and they instinctively fight against humans, who have been destroying its master, the earth.. When defeated they become shikifu as a sign of submission. They do have a will of their own and so far only two humanoid(amalgamated) types have been revealed.
Formation
A sealed dimension set in place using a Shikifu it acts not only as a means to hide from ordinary people but can be spread out depending on the Shikifu to cover the entire country if needed. Inside a formation of the corresponding season, spells powers increase and you can detect other Shiki Tsukai and Kijyuu. A stronger Shiki Tsukai can overwrite a weaker formation.

== Characters ==
Akira Kizuki
Akira is the fourteen-year-old protagonist of Shiki Tsukai. His birthday is December 3. He is a kindhearted boy who loves nature and animals. When he turns fourteen, he discovers not only that he is a shiki tsukai, but one with the rare ability to control all four seasons at once, the "Shinra". His abilities are immeasurable. Owing to his great power he is drawn into the war of seasons. On volume 4, he was partially awakened and produced a shikifu card for shinra banshou. It allows him to control any incantations from every season at will at ease and easily overpowered Nanayo in battle. However, since he's not fully awakened, it ended controlling him instead only to be saved by Koyomi later.
He seeks to befriend Kijyuu rather than harming them, as such most Kijyuu like him. He controls the powers of the shinra in vol.6
Koyomi Sakuragi
A sixteen-year-old girl with a straightforward personality, which sometimes surprises the people around her. Koyomi is a shiki tsukai wielding the March 3 Pink Beryl shikifu, enabling her to control the season of spring. She also has the special power to turn into a katana when the emblem on her chest is touched, her body is the sword & her clothes the sheath, so if she transom out of the sheath she's exposed.. She has been assigned to protect Akira until he is fifteen, she fights alongside him because his powers have not fully awakened yet. She usually wears her long pink hair in a ponytail. Her birthday is in March. Koyomi is actually a Kijyuu and the only humanoid(amalgamated) kijyuu in existence, although vol.5 proves this wrong. She was experimented by the Sakuragi corporation and was regarded as a monster by some researchers. The president of the Sakuragi corporation took care of her and treated her as his daughter. Her name Koyomi was taken from his dead daughter who died in an accident.
The Mysterious Boy aka The Kijyuu King from vol.5 states that she is going against her destiny by defending Akira, relating her feelings to what humans call love. She's extremely hostile towards him since she can't read his thoughts, going so far as to entrap Akira against his wishes and fights for him to protect his body and heart although she states she'll put his wishes before hers after he controlled Sjinra. She may also have a "True Form" like the Mysterious Boy.
Rei Seichouji
Akira's teacher. She is a "Shiki Tsukai" of February as is everyone in her family. Her birthday is February 2 and wields the February 2 Conch Shell shikifu. She is very powerful and has a fantastic body. She is also a rival to Akira's mother for Akira's father, calling her little Meg. She is a humanitarian and she loves cats. She has a rivalry with Kureha who was an ex-teacher and underwent the same thing as her. Volume 5 revealed she like other women who give birth to shikifu has lost the ability to give birth, so she gave up Junichiro and is content with protecting his child.
She's skilled at Martial arts and can manipulate her "Chi" to enhance her physical strength above human levels
Junichiro Kizuki
Akira's father, a very handsome man. Junichiro works for the Sakuragi Corporation. Unknown to Akira, his father actually knows about the "shiki tsukai". He also has a shikifu that control all seasons that only the shinra possessed. He dresses casual and sloppy with a carefree attitude until he gets to work, where he dresses in business outfit and becomes serious. If his son becomes the enemy of humanity he'll stop him with his life but he seems to have a secret plan he's not telling him. His destiny is stated to be unique in the Vol.6 character profile.
Megumi Kizuki
Akira's mother, she acts very youthful [usually mistaken as Akira's sister]. Most people would never guess that she has had a child before. She and Rei have know each other since before the series began, she calls her big Rei. She doesn't know about Shiki Tsukai or Shikifu. Also supposedly from a prestigious family.
Satsuki Inanae
Satsuki is Akira's childhood friend and his classmate. She believes that she is like an older sister to Akira. She calls Akira "Ah-chan", which he seems to dislike. She eventually awakens to her powers as the shiki tsukai of May after being kidnapped. She has finally become a full fledge Shiki Tsukai of May wielding the May 5 Red Coral shikifu, her mother may have also been one as well explaining her heritage. She is considered a genius with the Shikifu and she has a crush on Fumiya and is friends with Moe.
Kengo Inanae
Satsuki's father. In volume 3, it is revealed to be the shiki tsukai of May. He inherits his wife's Shikifu and travels the world collecting Shikifu. He was always getting beat up by his daughter for doing something like lying or leaving without any explanation. He's currently training Moe.
Moe Mutsuki
A young girl who is the shiki tsukai of January and heiress to the Mutsuki family that has ancient ties with the Seichouji family. Prim and polite, she usually works in the shadow protecting Akira and usually comes with a smile on her face. She wields the January 1 Imperial Jade shikifu. She is a miko and usually wears her hair in pigtails tied with miniature pom-poms. She like other women who give birth to shikifu has lost the ability to give birth, but she doesn't mind since it is tradition for women in her family to remain virgins. She is training with Kengo.
Fumiya Kirihara
Fumiya is Akira's childhood friend and his classmate and his parents are divorced. He is very composed and sharp. He says in volume 2 that he trusts Akira with his personal life very much. He is popular at school but doesn't known about it. He's also unaware of his sister being a Shiki Tsukai. He may also possess the potential to become one. In volume 7/8, it appears he suspects something is going on with Akira, as he asked Sakuragi why she approached Akira, or whose side she was on. It also mentions that he had saved Akira from a truck accident when he first moved into the neighbourhood, thus beginning their friendship which took quite a while for Fumiya to accept. He also stated that it was not he who saved Akira, but Akira saved him, as he took Fumiya out of his lonely shell.
Nanayo Rangetsu
A violet-haired woman wielding the July 7 Star Rose Quartz shikifu, as well as control of a familiar in the shape of a butterfly. Often wears a cap and has sadistic tendencies. She's skilled in sword fighting completely overwhelming Koyomi and Akira. In volume 4, it is revealed that she is Fumiya's sister but she always acts to be very sickly when he visits her and was the neighbor of Akira when they were two. Her reason to wipe out humanity is to create a perfect world for her brother.
Ryuka Kato
A July 25th born Shiki Tsukai, serves Nanayo and has 3 sigils. He was captured but let free. He's also a gifted hacker.
Kureha Kazumatsuri
A shiki tsukai of autumn/fall wielding the September 9 Aragonite shikifu. Acts a leader in a battle and a bit psychotic. It is revealed in volume 5 that she like other women who give birth to shikifu has lost the ability to give birth, this drove her insane. She kills her father who was also her teacher and obtains all the September sigils dates turning it into Sapphire Shikifu. Her original name was Momoji and her reason for wanting to destroy humanity is to release them from life's curse. She has a past with Rei 6 years ago and was an ex-teacher and was previously married.
Mina Suzukure
A quiet girl who is a shiki tsukai of June. Wields the June 6 Silicified Wood shikifu and daughter of the prestigious Suzukure family. She hasn't shown much emotion since a certain accident. She cherishes her pony tail more than her life.
Rinsho Matsukaze
A June Shiki Tsukai, he serves Mina without question. He's a gentleman and a man of conviction, willing to die in order to follow orders. He avoids causing unnecessary harm to others including hostages and really hates dishonorable tactics.
Shin Seichouji(Kijyuu King)
A tanned humanoid(amalgamated) Kijyuu born from 6 shikifu from multiple seasons and he has their memories too, he can speak and is similar to Koyomi, he is interested in Akira and seeks battle him to see if he is worthy to be their king, he first appears in volume 5.
His true form is that of a chimera and has a strong instinct of survival of the fittest, so he doesn't hate human for destroying the world and after the battle he serves as a Shikifu bank and receives the name "Shin" in volume 6. He finds Akira's father dangerous.

== Kijyuu ==
Tsukuyomi
Rei's Kijyuu, a black cat
Gao
Moe's Kijyuu, a white dog, turns into a werewolf in battle.
Benjamin
Koyomi's Kijyuu, looks like a cross between a rabbit and dog, he can transform into a large form to fight. He likes Akira.
Ryuta
Satsuki's Kijyuu, a baby dragon, becomes a large dragon in battle
Hien
Nanayo's Kijyuu, a butterfly that can transform into twin crescent blades. She can summon 3 of them
Water Orge
Rinsho's Kijyuu, a snake/dinosaur looking creature, has an extendable horn and can turn into a lance

== Season abilities ==
=== Spring ===
March
Has the ability to control plants. Has special power to control the wind and cherry blossoms and can also use lighting incantations.
April
Mid-spring month. Has the ability to control earth, can also use lighting, plant, and magnetic incantations
May
Has the ability to control light. Has special ability to control heat, can also use plant incantations. Has most powerful attacks and is fastest, but lacks precision and defense

=== Summer ===
June
Has the ability to control Liquids. Has special power to control decay and can also use defense incantations
July
Has the ability to control Heat. Can also use lighting incantations. It is the opposite of January
August
Has the ability to amplify, manipulate and shoot Spirit power. Can also use healing and illusion incantations.

=== Fall ===
September
Has the ability to control Air. Has special power to control gravity and typhoons and can also control wind and has strong offensive spells.
October
Has the ability to control Metal. Can also use lighting incantations and Special Defense abilities. It is the opposite of April
November
Has the ability to control Sound. Has special power to control colors and can also use cold temperature incantations. Has many abilities to affect senses.

=== Winter ===
December
Has the ability to control and communicate with animals. Has incantations to arm people. Has special abilities to control thoughts and can also use defense incantations.
January
Mid-Winter month and has the ability to control Ice. Can also use lighting and illusion incantations.
February
Has the ability to amplify, manipulate and shoot Chi. Has special ability to heal and can also use illusion incantations.

== Reception ==
Katherine Dacey felt that the manga borrowed its environmental themes from X.
