= Fairy Navigator Runa =

Manga series

- First book of the novel series

妖界ナビ・ルナ (Youkai Navi Runa)
- Genre: Magical girl
- Manga
- Written by: Miyoko Ikeda
- Illustrated by: Michiyo Kikuta
- Published by: Kodansha
- English publisher: Del Rey Manga (North America)
- Magazine: Nakayoshi
- Original run: 2008 – 2010
- Volumes: 7

Fairy Navigator Runa (妖界ナビ・ルナ, Youkai Navi Runa) is a children's novel series by Miyoko Ikeda published by Iwasaki Shoten. It was later adapted into a manga series by Michiyo Kikuta published in Nakayoshi by Kodansha and licensed by Del Rey. Publication was taken over by Kodansha after the second volume of the manga was released by Del Rey.

== Characters ==
Runa Rindo
Runa is a fourth grade ten-year-old who's always in her own world, and she's a total klutz. She can also guess what's for lunch every day and never get it wrong, which is the strange part. But her true identity is the "Legendary Child", she was born to a fairy mother and a human father. When the "Third Eye" on the nape of her neck opens, her eyes become vortexes and Runa gains the ability to use special powers. Her mission is to send back all the bad fairies since they came from an earthquake opening the road between the human world and the fairy world because the shrine closing the road sank. She has a mysterious connection to Tai. She seems to be the only one who knows where the Jewel of Everlasting Time is. In the 2nd volume she leaves the Children of the Stars School, where she was raised in and goes to complete her missions.
Mokke
Mokke is a fairy that was one of the 2 sent to help protect Runa. He usually appears as a boy or an owl, he's a little bit bratty and he's loud, but he was the one who stopped Runa from killing Kamachi.
Suneri
Suneri is the other fairy that was sent to help protect Runa. She usually appears as a beautiful girl or a white cat. She acts as Runa`s big sister and has the powers of healing.
Tai
Tai is a mysterious boy who seems to be connected to Runa. He also seems to be working for an evil fairy. He has powers of some sort.
Kazan
Kazan is the dog that Tai always has with him.
Ms. Towako
Ms. Towako used to work at the Children of the Stars School. She raised Runa like she was her mother. She was also the person who taught Runa to "keep an open heart and to love the people around her."
Sae
Sae is a girl who yells at the bad things that Runa does because she knows that Runa is a strong girl. Runa calls her Chae, and Sae helped Runa send back Kamachi by giving her the pendant. She is a student from the Children of the Stars School.
Renmei-sama
Runa's mother who had the power to travel between the two worlds.
Seigo-sama
Runa's father who helped Runa block out the third eye for a while and who left her at the front gate of the Children of the Stars School. He was a yin-yang master.
Mit-chan
Mit-chan is a character who almost died when she was running to Runa when she saw her and the traffic light was still red, but she was saved by Runa. Mit-chan is Runa's friend and the little girl who carries a teddy bear around everywhere. She is a student at the Children of the Stars School.
Mana-chan
Mana-chan is the character that praises Runa for being able to guess the lunch every day. She doesn't like that Sae yells at Runa, but is still friends with the both of them. She also worries about Runa a lot. She is a student from the Children of the Stars School.
Kamachi
Kamachi is a fairy who takes Sae as a hostage to try to get the Jewel of Everlasting Time from Runa and was going to be killed by Runa, but Mokke saves him and he gets sent back to the fairy world.
Shizuku
Shizuku is a mermaid. She sang in the park, which Luna admired. Later she found Luna unconscious, after being bitten by Kazan. Shizuku is in love with Ryoo.

== Reception ==
"Fairy Navigator Runa is a persuasive new series that puts an original and more mature twist to the magical girl genre." – Rachel Bentham, activeAnime. "This is a very predictable girls' fantasy, in which everyone is secretly magical and powerful." – Johanna Draper Carlson, Manga Worth Reading. "As Fairy Navigator Runa begins, it quickly appears to be going down a bland and generic path." – Matthew Warner, Mania. "Fairy Navigator Runa is an almost perfect example of the magical-girl genre that tweens love so well." – Brigid Alverson, Teenreads.
