= Nina Matsumoto =

Japanese-Canadian cartoonist (born 1984)

- Born: 18 November 1984 (age 42) British Columbia
- Areas: Cartoonist, writer
- Pseudonym: Space coyote
- Notable works: Yōkaiden; Saturnalia; Sparks!
- Awards: Eisner Awards, Web Cartoonists' Choice Awards

Nina Matsumoto (born 18 November 1984) is a Japanese-Canadian cartoonist, also known as "space coyote", and most known for creating the comic book series Yōkaiden for Del Rey Manga. She created the webcomic Saturnalia, and has worked as a penciller on Simpsons Comics and The Last Airbender Prequel: Zuko's Story graphic novel. She is also the artist and co-creator of Sparks!, a graphic novel series for Scholastic Books.

== Biography ==
Matsumoto first came to the attention of the comic industry through her widely distributed artwork Simpsonzu, a manga stylized parody artwork of The Simpsons cast. After the image was picked up by digg, it became one of the most popular deviations ever submitted to DeviantArt and caught the attention of Bongo Comics, as well as editor Dallas Middaugh of Del Rey Manga and The Simpsons creator, Matt Groening. Middaugh read Matsumoto's long-running webcomic Saturnalia and then invited her to submit a proposal which became the graphic novel Yōkaiden. She created another viral work in 2020, Mr. Peanut Devouring His Son, which parodied Francisco Goya's Saturn Devouring His Son and referenced an advertising campaign in which Planters killed off their mascot.

== Bibliography ==
=== Comics ===
- Saturnalia, 11 chapters, 2002, artist & writer, webcomic
- Simpsons Comics:
  - Simpsons Comics No. 131, July 2007, penciller, Too Crazy Juvenile Prankster: Bartomu!, Bongo Comics
  - Bart Simpson No. 38, October 2007 penciller, Milhouse's Guide to Keeping it Cool, Bongo Comics
  - Bart Simpson No. 39, December 2007, penciller, Window of Opportunity, Bongo Comics
  - Simpsons Comics Bongo Comics Free-For-All, May 2008, penciller, Too Crazy Juvenile Prankster: Bartomu!, Bongo Comics
  - Bart Simpson No. 42, June 2008, penciller, Ponce Upon a Time, Bongo Comics
  - Treehouse of Horror No. 14, October 2008, penciller, Murder He Wrote, Bongo Comics (A parody of Death Note)
  - Simpsons Comics Winter Wingding No. 5, November 2010, penciller, Bongo Comics
  - Bart Simpson No. 57, December 2010, penciller, Bongo Comics
- Yōkaiden:
  - Yōkaiden volume No. 1, 2008, artist & writer, graphic novel, Del Rey Manga, ISBN 0-345-50327-9
  - Yōkaiden volume No. 2, 2009, artist & writer, graphic novel, Del Rey Manga, ISBN 0-345-50329-5
- The Last Airbender Prequel: Zuko's Story, 2010, artist, graphic novel, Del Rey Manga, ISBN 0-345-51854-3

== Awards ==
- 2009: "Best Short Story", Eisner Award, for Treehouse of Horror No. 14, Murder He Wrote, Bongo Comics
