= Kasumi (comics) =

English Manga by Surt Lim

- Genre: Magic
- Author: Surt Lim
- Illustrator: Hirofumi Sugimoto
- Publisher: Del Rey Manga
- Original run: 2008
- Volumes: 2

Kasumi is an original English-language manga written by Surt Lim, illustrated by Hirofumi Sugimoto and published by Del Rey Manga. The first volume of the manga was released by Del Rey Manga on July 28, 2008.

== Production ==
As Surt Lim is an American writer and Hirofumi Sugimoto is a Japanese manga artist, most of the collaboration between the two were done with "online Japanese-English translator, instant messenger, e-mail and the assistance of a bilingual translator based in Tokyo". To draw shōjo manga, shōnen manga artist Hirofumi Sugimoto had to study shōjo manga, especially those of Moto Hagio's.

Inspired by Boys Over Flowers, Special A and The Gentlemen's Alliance Cross with their "exclusive private school" setting, Surt Lim wrote Kasumi with "an average girl in a high school with lots of hot guys" in mind. Both Surt and Sugimoto agree that the manga contains both shōjo and shōnen elements, like Tsubasa: Reservoir Chronicle.

== Reception ==
Comics Worth Reading's Johanna Draper Carlson comments on the illustrator's portrayal of the male protagonist by putting an "unusual twist on the standard otaku geek". Mania.com's Erin Jones criticises the manga for most of the characters being "clichéd, overly-predictable" as well as the plot that takes "too long to be implemented". About.com's Deb Aobi commends the manga for its "clean, simple and appealing artwork that doesn't get in the way of the story" but criticises it for "the characters' occasional lack of noses", which she feels is "distracting". A later review of Volume 2 by Deb Aoki commends it by "A lot more action-packed than Volume 1" but criticises it for overusing "sound effects".
