= The Yagyu Ninja Scrolls =

Manga by Masaki Segawa

- First tankōbon volume cover published by Kodansha

Y十M ～柳生忍法帖～ (Y- Jyu -M - Yagyū Ninpōchō)
- Genre: Horror, Historical
- Manga
- Written by: Masaki Segawa
- Published by: Kodansha
- English publisher: NA: Del Rey Manga (former) Kodansha USA (digital)
- Magazine: Weekly Young Magazine
- Original run: May 2, 2005 – June 16, 2008
- Volumes: 11

The Yagyu Ninja Scrolls (Japanese: Y十M(ワイ じゅう エム) ～柳生忍法帖～, Hepburn: Y- Jyu -M - Yagyū Ninpōchō) is a Japanese manga series by Masaki Segawa, an adaptation of a novel Yagyū Ninpōchō by Futaro Yamada. It was serialized in Kodansha's seinen manga magazine Weekly Young Magazine from May 2005 to June 2008, with its chapters collected in eleven tankōbon volumes. Like the author's previous title Basilisk, The Yagyu Ninja Scrolls is based on a novel from Yamada's Ninpōchō series and can therefore be considered a sequel to Basilisk, especially as several of the same historical characters featured in Basilisk make a return appearance. Its story centers on seven female survivors of the Hori clan, aided by Yagyū Jūbei, and their quest of vengeance.

Del Rey Manga licensed the manga for an English-language release in North America; they published seven volumes from October 2007 to November 2009. After Del Rey Manga's license expired, in October 2012, Kodansha USA acquired the license for digital in North America, released the full manga digitally from August 2016 to April 2017.

== Plot ==
In the Nineteenth Year of Kannei (1642), a rebellion by the Hori clan against Katō Akinari, the daimyō of Aizu, has been suppressed through the intervention of the Tokugawa shogunate. Placed into the custody of the Seven Spears, Katō's brutal group of personal enforcers, the Hori men are dragged to the Tōkei-ji "Divorce Temple" at Kamakura where the Hori women had been hiding. Despite a law passed by the former shogun Tokugawa Ieyasu forbidding men to enter the temple, the Seven Spears force their way in and brutally slaughter the Hori women in front of their husbands and brothers, before proceeding to murder them too. The massacre is stopped only by the intervention of Princess Sen, the Tōkei-ji Temple's guardian and older sister to the reigning shogun Tokugawa Iemitsu. When the Seven Spears agree to depart, only seven of the Hori women are left alive.

In retribution for the violation of Tōkeiji Temple and those who she had taken under her care, Princess Sen sends a message to the famous monk Takuan Sōhō. She asks him to locate a person who can train the seven Hori women in the arts of ninjutsu to seek their revenge. The one chosen is Yagyū Jūbei Mitsuyoshi, son of Yagyū Munenori and former instructor to the shogun. With Jubei's instruction and guidance, the Hori women begin their war against the Seven Spears and ultimately Katō himself.

== Characters ==
- Yagyū Jūbei Mitsuyoshi (柳生 十兵衛 三厳): Son of the famous Yagyū Munenori, Jūbei was formerly a sword instructor for Shogun Iemitsu but gave up the post to his younger brother in order to live as a wandering swordsman. Chosen by Takuan Sōhō at the request of Princess Sen to train the Hori women in the arts of war, Jūbei had strong doubts as to whether they would be able to win but agreed to teach them as it might prove interesting. As the Seven Spears greatly outclass the Hori women in terms of power and martial ability, Jūbei instead instructs them in the ways of military strategy, devising ambush tactics for the Hori women to eliminate the Seven Spears one by one in ways that neutralize their individual skills. Although a harsh and merciless teacher (Takuan relates to Princess Sen how during one of his lessons with Iemitsu Jūbei beat his student to the point that Iemitsu couldn't even stand), Jūbei has a mischievous streak to him and he enjoys needling and annoying the Hori women while his cavalier attitude belies both his strong sense of justice and his dedication to his students.

=== The Hori Clan ===
- Hori Mondo Tsunafusa (堀 主水, Hori Mondo): Lord of the Hori Clan and former samurai to Aizu daimyō Katō Akinari. Despite his disgust at the wanton acts of violence and depravity performed by his lord, Mondo performed his required duty as Katō's Kuni-Garo (chief vassal) until he was pressured to surrender his daughter Ochie to be Katō's mistress. Knowing that Katō would never accept his refusal, Mondo sent Ochie and the other Hori women into hiding at Tōkei-ji Temple while he and his men launched an assault on Katō's castle. Defeated by his soldiers, Mondo and his men fled to Koyasan where they posed as monks before being captured by Shogunate forces who turned them over to the Seven Spears. Mondo was then dragged in stocks to Tōkei-ji where he was forced to witness the slaughter of nearly all the Hori women before being taken back to Aizu where he and his men were brutally tortured to death.
- Ochie (お千絵): The daughter of Hori Mondo and princess to the Hori. Following the genocide of her clan, Ochie rises to take leadership of the survivors in their quest for revenge against Katō and the Seven Spears. Because of the abuse she and the others suffered at the hands of Katō and his subordinates, Ochie develops an aversion to all men and at first refuses to accept Jubei's help yet gradually comes to respect him as both a mentor and a comrade.
- Ofue (お笛): The attendant and confidante of Ochie, Ofue is the most easily distinguished of the Hori women due to her shorter, brown hair. The most outspoken of the Hori women, Ofue is easily riled which makes her a prime target for Jubei's teasing. She frequently serves as comic relief. Though she hates Jyubei at first, she gradually develops a large crush on him, which she reveals in the fourth volume of the manga, much to the amusement of the other Hori women.
- Sakura (さくら): The daughter of Mondo's brother Manabe Shobei and cousin to Ochie. Quiet and introspective, Sakura is sometimes assigned by Jūbei to spy on their enemies as her close-cropped hair allows her to disguise herself as either a woman or a young man.
- Osawa (お沙和): The wife of Mondo's brother Tagei Matahachiro and aunt to Ochie and Sakura. Osawa is a talented seamstress whom Jūbei assigns to create whatever costumes and disguises are required to spy or entrap their enemies. She serves as a mother figure to the other Hori women.
- Oshina (お品): The wife of Mondo's vassal Kanemaru Hansaku. Although dedicated to avenging her clan, Oshina is the most timid of the surviving women and rarely speaks.
- Otori (お鳥): The daughter of Mondo's vassal Itakura Buden. Despite her plump frame, she possesses both great agility and balance which aided her during her duel with Magobei.
- Okei (お圭): The wife of Mondo's vassal Inaba Jyuzaburo. When the Seven Spears start terrorizing Edo and kidnapping couples on their wedding night to lure out Jyubei, Okei and Jyubei disguise themselves as a recently married couple and allow themselves to be kidnapped by the Spears. They are taken to the Katō mansion, where they plan to take Lord Akinari hostage. The plan goes awry, and without the surprise intervention of Ochie, Ofue, and Sakura, who had followed them in secret, they both would have perished in the mansion. After the ordeal, the other Hori women begin to show jealousy toward her, thinking that Jyubei had begun to favor her ever since she played the role of his bride.

=== The Katō Clan and the Ashina ===
- Katō Shikinobusho Akinari (加藤 明成, Katō Akinari): The daimyo of Aizu and lord of the Katō clan (the historical Katō Akinari ruled Aizu between 1631 and 1643). Sadistic and perverse, Katō ruthlessly slaughters any who oppose him and spends his days fornicating with the constantly changing members of his harem. Although Katō's public face is of a fearless and powerful noble such as when he held his own against the attempted intimidation by Date Masamune (a bold man known as The One-Eyed Dragon); his private moments reveal him to be an insecure and apprehensive individual plagued by nightmares and constantly overshadowed by the legacy of his father.

==== The Ashina ====
A clan of ninja who once ruled over Aizu, the Ashina rescued Lord Katō seven years prior to the manga's beginning when he was attacked by an unknown assailant while out hawking. In gratitude, Katō selected seven of the strongest Ashina to be his personal bodyguards and enforcers, naming them the Seven Spears of Aizu after the historical Seven Spears of Shizugatake whom his father, Katō Yoshiaki, had led. The Ashina are as perverse as their Lord and whenever Katō grows bored with any of his consorts, the unlucky women are given to the Seven Spears who rape and torture them to death.

- Ashina Dohaku (芦名 銅伯): The primary villain of the second half of the series. Dohaku is Lord of the Ashina ninja clan and vassal to Katō. He trained the Seven Spears and holds the true power in Aizu, ruling from behind Katō's throne. He is 107 years old, the father of Oyura, and the twin brother of the High Priest Tenkai. His life is inextricably linked to that of his holy brother: if one is wounded the other will also feel pain; if one is killed, then the other one will die at the same time. But like Yakushiji Tenzen, the villain in Basilisk (Yamada/Segawa's previous work), Dohaku seems to be unkillable, and any attack to his body will heal in a matter of moments. His ultimate goal is for the Ashina clan to obtain complete and legitimate dominion over Aizu by joining the Kato and Ashina houses through Lord Akinari's union with Oyura. Dohaku plans to assassinate Akinari's son Akitomo so that Akinari and Oyura's child (Dohaku's grandchild) will become the new heir to Aizu's power. After dealing a death-blow to his own daughter while trying to kill Jūbei, Dohaku tries to destroy himself with the intention of also destroying his twin brother Tenkai, but Tenkai's determination to thwart Dohaku proves overpowering and Jūbei is able to strike Dohaku down.
- Oyura (おゆら): The daughter of Ashina Dohaku. Oyura is beautiful and seductive, and serves as Lord Akinari's main concubine in Aizu. She first appears in the sixth volume and the seventh one reveals her to be as cruel and sadistic as Katō, and delights in slaughtering many of the women kidnapped and imprisoned beneath Aizu castle. She and Katō are almost always seen being extremely intimate with one another regardless of where they are and who is present, including her own father who simply ignores their affairs while he discussed certain matters with the Seven Spears. However, after Jūbei's capture, she ultimately fell in love with him, to the point of taking a fatal blow from her father meant for Jūbei (though not realizing it would kill her).

===== The Seven Spears =====
- Daidoji Tessai (大道寺 鉄斎): The oldest of the seven spears, Tessai wields a two-handed scythe that can be split in half to form a kusarigama. The weapon also contains a weighted chain in the butt of the handle and a retractable secondary scythe blade in the head. Tessai is easily angered and will even lash out at his allies if he feels they've insulted him. Tessai often goes to the Yoshiwara brothel district to purchase women on his lord Akinari's behalf. In fact, a flashback in the first volume reveals that Tessai was the one who requested that Hori Mondo send his daughter (Ochie) to serve as Akinari's mistress. In response, Mondo rebuked Tessai, insulted Akinari, and later lead the doomed rebellion against his cruel lord, setting off the events of the story. Tessai dies at the hands of the Hori women, ambushed at dusk in the streets of Yoshiwara. After a short fight, the women trap and immobilize both ends of his chained weapon, then rush in from all sides to stab him with their blades. He is the first of the Spears to die.
- Hiraga Magobei (平賀 孫兵衛): Magobei stands out among the other Seven Spears due to his dark complexion. A specialist in long range combat, he wields a 20-foot (6.1 m) cavalry spear with the same speed and precision on foot as he would on horseback. In the second volume of the manga, Magobei accompanies Tessai to the Yoshiwara brothel district to purchase concubines for Lord Akinari. Disgusted by the brothel owner's smugness, he declares to Tessai that he will not return with him later to pick up the women. This decision may have saved his life—Tessai returns to Yoshiwara alone, where he is ambushed and killed by the Hori women. In the third volume of the manga Magobei pairs up with Gusoku Jyonoshin to confront Jyubei and Otoro at night in the streets outside Edo Castle. A canal divides the street between him and Jyubei, and so he strikes across the water with his spear. Jyubei swiftly traps the spearblade to the ground, disabling the weapon while Otori charges across the shaft, using it as a bridge to cross the canal and strike down Magobei. Magobei draws his wakizashi and slices through the shaft of his trapped spear, but instead of falling into the canal Otori springs into the air, catapulting herself above and inside his range of attack. Her blade slices him vertically from head to navel. He is the second of the Spears to die.
- Gusoku Jyunoshin (具足 丈之進): The weakest of the Seven Spears, Jyunoshin specializes neither in weapons nor hand-to-hand combat. Instead, he controls a pack of vicious dogs the size of calves whom he uses to hunt down and ultimately tear his opponents to pieces. His small size and overlong arms cause him to resemble a monkey, a fact the other Seven Spears frequently use to insult him. In the manga's third volume, Jyunoshin aides Magobei in a sneak assault on both Jūbei and Otori which ended in the death of both Magobei and two of Jyunoshin's dogs at the hands of Jubei, leaving Jyunoshin deeply traumatized and convinced that the Hori women's mysterious teacher was well beyond their ability to slay. Following the Hori women's infiltration of the Katō mansion in the fourth volume, Jyonoshin and Lord Akinari were captured and cast before Edo Castle's Takebashi Gate, where they were discovered by Princess Sen. The princess recognized them and, as punishment for their wickedness, had them marched through the streets of Edo like common criminals, exposing them to public ridicule. Following the incident, Lord Akinari went into a blind rage and promised to have Jyonoshin killed unless he uncovered the whereabouts of the Hori women. Using Tenmaru, his only surviving dog, Jyonoshin tracked the Hori women to Tokaiji temple. Shaving his head and posing as a priest, Jyonoshin managed to enter the temple where he discovered Ochie picking flowers in the temple grounds. Taking her by surprise, Jyonoshin gloatingly remarked that it had been he who had finished off Ochie's father Mondo in an attempt to goad her into attacking when Osawa, who had been hiding in a nearby tree, leaped down from the branches and drove her sword into Jyonoshin, pinning him to the ground. He is the third of the Spears to die.
- Washinosu Rensuke (鷲ノ巣 廉助): The most physically powerful of the Seven Spears, Rensuke is easily distinguished by his massive chin and sideburns. He disdains the use of weapons in favor of kenpō (Japanese martial arts inspired by Chinese martial arts) and his own inhuman strength. During the Seven Spears assault on Tōkei-ji, Rensuke was able to break open the temple's gate using his bare hands and feet. In the fourth volume of the series, while the Seven Spears are terrorizing Edo in Hannya masks, Jyubei tries (unsuccessfully) to pose as Rensuke in order to enter the Katō mansion. Koshichiro sees through his ruse and strikes at him, splitting the hannya mask to reveal not Rensuke, but Yagyū Jyubei (though through the darkness and rain he cannot recognize Jyubei's features.) Aside from Jyonoshin, Rensuke appears to have the most self-control of the Seven Spears, though his stems from his own intelligence, whereas Jyonoshi's is typically the result of cowardice. He is often called upon to hold Ginshiro back when the boy's tantrums threaten to become dangerous. In the sixth volume of the manga, Rensuke attempts to hunt down the Hori women and captures Otori and Oshina on the Aizu Echigo Road. He strips them of clothing and ties them to his body as a shield. As a result, Jūbei is prepared to offer his life for theirs when their monk companions from Tōkei-ji Temple take up their own swords and confront Rensuke. They drop the swords for the captive women as Rensuke kills them, allowing Otori and Oshina to seize the blades and sever Rensuke's legs. As he bleeds to death, Jūbei arrives on the scene, pinning Rensuke to the ground with his foot so the big man cannot struggle toward the women. Rensuke realizes Jūbei Yagyū was his true enemy, and he smiles as he dies, contented by the fact that ultimately he had been defeated not by women, but by the greatest and most famous swordsman in the world. He is the fourth of the Spears to die.
- Shiba Ichiganbo (司馬 一眼坊): A one-eyed pig of a man, Ichiganbo's bulk belies both his incredible martial ability and his cunning. Highly observant, he's usually the first to figure out crucial aspects that his comrades overlook and was the one who proposed framing Princess Sen in order to draw out Jubei. According to his plan, the Seven Spears would dress up in hannya masks and terrorize Edo, kidnapping betrothed couples on their wedding nights. The women would be brought to Akinari, and the men would be tortured and cast off in front of Edo Castle's Takebashi gate. In battle, he wields a whip that responds as though it were an extension of his own being. He can even use it to amputate parts of an opponent's body by wrapping it around their limbs or necks and pulling the whip taut. In the seventh volume of the manga, Ichiganbo leads a patrol of one dozen men into the wilderness of Northern Aizu to seek out the Hori women, who have infiltrated Lord Katō's territory. He is ambushed and killed by the Hori women, who had been concealing themselves in the fallen autumn leaves, stabbing him on all sides. Ochie finishes him off, splitting his head like a log with her blade. After his death, Ichiganbo's body is hidden inside a snowman outside Lord Katō's castle, where it is discovered on New Year's Day (Ashina Dohaku's birthday, incidentally) by Koshichiro and Ginshiro. He is the fifth of the Spears to die.
- Koro Ginshiro (香炉 銀四郎): The youngest of the Seven Spears, Ginshiro is cocky and impulsive. He is very feminine in appearance, but his otherwise beautiful features are marred by a thin, dark, scar that runs vertically down the middle of his face. He wields a net that when folded can easily be concealed within the palm of his hand yet when deployed can expand to envelop multiple people. The net possesses surprising strength despite its delicate appearance and its mesh is fine enough that not even air can pass through. Following Jubei's surprise raid on Katō's mansion, Ginshiro was the one who discovered that the Hori women had departed the convent. He also lusts after Sakura as during the murder of the Hori clan's female members he requests that the others allow him to slay her personally. Of all the Seven Spears, Ginshiro has the quickest temper and the least self-control. He is prone to sudden, violent rages, and often resorts to hissing, screaming, and insults when faced with a conflict. When Oyuri, under the influence of a powerful aphrodisiac, almost distracts Jūbei, he tries to use his net, but is wounded by Jubei before the net can land; when the net envelops the Hori women, Jūbei slices off the arm controlling the net. He is the sixth to die.
- Urushido Koshichiro (漆戸 虹七郎): The central member of the Seven Spears, Koshichiro is a master swordsman despite missing his left arm. In the first volume, he leads the massacre at the convent in Kamakura. Throughout the series, but more noticeably in later volumes, Koshichiro is portrayed as Jyubei's opposite among the enemy. He is bent on crossing blades with Jyubei, eager to determine once and for all which of them is the better swordsman. In the fourth volume, after being defeated in a brief encounter with the Seven Spears, Jyubei expresses doubt as to whether or not he would be able to defeat Koshichiro if they ever dueled. Koshichiro shows a peculiar mannerism when he kills, as shown in volumes 1, 9, and 11. Before engaging an opponent, he slips a flowering twig of cherry blossoms into his mouth (if one is available), and grips it in his teeth as he attacks. Though the manga does not specify a reason for this, there seems to be a poetic significance behind this quirk; falling cherry blossoms have traditionally been seen by samurai as a metaphor for death and the fragility of life. He is the last of the Seven Spears to die, finished off by Ochie and Ofue after having been granted his greatest wish by Jūbei to face him one-on-one.

=== Others ===
- Tokugawa Iemitsu (徳川 家光): The grandson of Tokugawa Ieyasu and the current reigning shogun. In the years between Basilisk and The Yagyū Ninja Scrolls, Iemitsu has grown from a somewhat dimwitted child into a capable and efficient ruler. Although he sympathizes with the Hori clan, his responsibilities as Shogun demand that he arrest them for the crime of rebellion and deliver them to Katō for punishment. As the Hori women had hidden in a divorce temple forbidding the entrance of men, Iemitsu was willing to spare at least them and was greatly troubled to hear that the Ashina were the ones charged with delivering the Hori to Aizu.
- Nankoubou Tenkai (南光坊 天海): The archbishop of Kanneiji temple. As with Ieyasu, Tenkai serves in Shogun Iemitsu's inner circle as his most trusted advisor. While he agrees with Iemitsu's decision to turn over the Hori men to Katō while leaving the Hori women sequestered in the divorce temple, Tenkai is all too aware of the Ashina clan's capacity for violence and the potential of the Seven Spears to escalate the already tenuous situation. He is the twin brother of Ashina Dohaku.
- Yagyū Munenori (柳生 宗矩): The father of Yagyū Jūbei and another former member of Tokugawa Ieyasu's inner circle. In the years between Basilisk and The Yagyū Ninja Scrolls, Munenori had been appointed sometsuke (the overseer of the daimyo) and since retired yet still holds a place in Iemitsu's council. Like Tenkai, he supports Iemitsu's decision to arrest the Hori men, stating that regardless of how justified their actions, allowing any sort of anarchy to go unpunished would jeorpardize the Tokugawa Shogunate's hold over the various regions.
- Princess Sen (Tenjuin) (千姫 (天樹院), Sen-hime (Tenjuin)): The granddaughter of Ieyasu and older sister to Shogun Iemitsu. As the guardian of Tōkei-ji Temple, Princess Sen was the one who convinced her grandfather to enact a law banning any man from entering. When Hori Mondo staged his rebellion against the Katō clan, Princess Sen agreed to grant shelter for the Hori women, disguising them as nuns but permitting them to keep their hair in the hopes that they would be able to leave once the matter had been settled. When the Seven Spears launched their attack, Princess Sen offered her life in exchange for the seven surviving Hori women and the Seven Spears retreated for fear that she would convince Iemitsu to have Mondo and his men released as well. Because both of her prior husbands died shortly after marrying her, a rumor spread throughout Edo stating that she seduced men only to kill them after having her way with them. Following the death of Magobei, the remaining Seven Spears took advantage of the rumor in order to draw out Jūbei by framing her for the kidnapping of several soon to be married couples throughout Edo.
- Tenshuni (天秀尼, Tenshū'ni): The high priestess of Tōkei-ji Temple and the granddaughter of Toyotomi Hideyoshi, Ieyasu's sworn rival. Following the Siege of Osaka in which the Toyotomi clan perished, Tenshuni was adopted by Princess Sen - whom Ieyasu had wed to Hideyoshi's son Hideyori as part of his political ambitions-and sequestered in Tōkei-ji. During the raid by the Seven Spears, Tenshuni was almost killed by Ginshiro who enveloped her in his net and nearly suffocated her before Ochie and the other Hori women revealed themselves. Although put off by Jubei's lack of grace, Tenshuni allows him to stay at Tōkei-ji to train the Hori women under the condition that he wear a set of bells to alert the other nuns to his presence. Jūbei would later repay the favor by having the Hori women wear bells while staying at Tokaiji.
- Takuan Sōhō (沢庵 宗彭): The High Priest of Shinagawa Banshozan Tokaiji Temple in Edo. Because of his friendships with various generals and swordsmen, Takuan was asked by Princess Sen to find a sensei who could train the surviving Hori women to defeat the Seven Spears. Later, as the Hori women begin their assault, he grants them and Jūbei shelter at his temple since the last place the Seven Spears would look for them would be a monastery forbidding women to enter.
- Shoji Jinnemon (庄司 甚右衛門): The owner of the Nishida-ya Brothel in Yoshiwara who frequently sells girls to Katō. In the past, Jinnemon was a bandit known as Shoji Jinnai who plundered the region of Kankatsu-sa as part of a trio of thieves known as the Three Jinnais. Although he learns of the way Katō abuses and eventually kills his consorts, he continues to sell women to him in exchange for higher costs to ensure his silence. After the Hori women kill Tessai who had been escorting the latest group of girls Katō had purchased, Jūbei assaults Jinnemon and forces him to provide money for the girls to escape, promising that he would return if Jinnemon ever sold another woman to the Katō clan.
- Otone (おとね): The 19-year-old daughter of Kamiya Goroemon (紙屋 五郎右衛門), owner of the Koga Lodgings. She first appears in the sixth volume of the manga. During their stay at the Koga Lodgings, the Seven Spears become gravely concerned for their lord, who had grown paranoid to the point where he couldn't sleep and would often mutter to himself that Hori Mondo's ghost was haunting him (supposedly as retribution for slaughtering his clan). An irritated Ginshiro suggested to his fellow Spears that they find a woman to keep their lord company in hopes that it would help ease his paranoia. Otone was chosen for this purpose and is later kidnapped in her sleep by Ginshiro. The following morning, just before departing the lodge, the Spears presented Otone, bound up and terrified, to Katō who took an instant liking to her and incessantly violates her inside the palanquin throughout the trip. Otone was eventually rescued by Takuan, his followers and three of the Hori women who were disguised as priests at the time. Indebted to them for saving her, Otone joins the Hori women in their quest of vengeance against the Seven Spears.

== Publication ==
The Yagyū Ninja Scrolls was serialised in Kodansha's Weekly Young Magazine from May 2, 2005, to June 16, 2008. Kodansha, collected the individual chapters into eleven tankōbon volumes between November 2, 2005, and August 6, 2008.

In May 2007, the series was licensed for an English-language release in North America by Del Rey Manga, which released seven volumes from October 2007 to November 2009. In October 2010, the series was re-licensed by Kodansha USA, and they released the full manga digitally from August 2016 to April 2017. In October 2012, the digital manga platform JManga added the series under the title The Yagyu Ninja Scrolls: Revenge of the Hori Clan to its service.

=== Volumes ===
No.	Title	Original release date	English release date
01	Vow of Vengeance	November 2, 2005; 978-4-06-361389-6	October 30, 2007 (Del Rey Manga); August 9, 2016 (digital) (Kodansha USA); 978-0-345-50118-9 (Del Rey Manga); 978-1-68-233357-0 (Kodansha USA)
01. "The Broken Gate"; 02. "The Hori Mondo Matter"; 03. "That Man"; 04. "Forty-Four Memorial Tablets"; 05. "Into the Abyss"; 06. "Seven Snake Eyes"
02	Blood on the Trail	November 2, 2005; 978-4-06-361390-2	February 5, 2008 (Del Rey Manga); August 9, 2016 (digital) (Kodansha USA); 978-0-345-50120-2 (Del Rey Manga); 978-1-68-233358-7 (Kodansha USA)
07. "The Man in the Red Mask"; 08. "The Man in the Red Mask (2)"; 09. "Jyūbei, Basket Buyer"; 10. "Bidding at Yoshiwara"; 11. "A Group of Demonesses"; 12. "A Group of Demonesses (2)"; 13. "The Bearded Kyō Doll"
03	Strike and Counterstrike	March 4, 2006; 978-4-06-361426-8	May 13, 2008 (Del Rey Manga); August 23, 2016 (digital) (Kodansha USA); 978-0-345-50121-9 (Del Rey Manga); 978-1-68-233359-4 (Kodansha USA)
14. "Sensei Jyūbei"; 15. "Sensei Jyūbei (2)"; 16. "Manji Jump"; 17. "Bamboo Spear Bridge"; 18. "Five Snake Eyes"; 19. "The Three Benefits"; 20. "The Hannya Bandits"
04	Blood Wedding	August 4, 2006; 978-4-06-361466-4	August 19, 2008 (Del Rey Manga); September 6, 2016 (digital) (Kodansha USA); 978-0-345-50122-6 (Del Rey Manga); 978-1-68-233360-0 (Kodansha USA)
21. "The Hannya Bandits (2)"; 22. "Flower in the Abyss"; 23. "Splitting the Mask"; 24. "Autumn Wind at Tōkaiji Temple"; 25. "Snake Eyes Lottery"; 26. "Bride in Hell"; 27. "Bride in Hell (2)"; 28. "Bride in Hell (3)"; 29. "Water Grave"; 30. "Water Grave (2)"
05	Stalemate!	October 6, 2006; 978-4-06-361482-4	October 21, 2008 (Del Rey Manga); September 20, 2016 (digital) (Kodansha USA); 978-0-345-50421-0 (Del Rey Manga); 978-1-68-233361-7 (Kodansha USA)
31. "Watery Grave (3)"; 32. "Watery Grave (4)"; 33. "Watery Grave (5)"; 34. "Humiliation"; 35. "Humiliation (2)"; 36. "Dog and Monkey Tōkaiji Temple"; 37. "Dog and Monkey Tōkaiji Temple (2)"; 38. "Gift From Edo"; 39. "Gift From Edo (2)"; 40. "Journey North"
06	Vengeance!	February 6, 2007; 978-4-06-361526-5	June 23, 2009 (Del Rey Manga); October 4, 2016 (digital) (Kodansha USA); 978-0-345-50422-7 (Del Rey Manga); 978-1-68-233362-4 (Kodansha USA)
41. "Journey North (2)"; 42. "Journey North (3)"; 43. "Journey North (4)"; 44. "Journey North (5)"; 45. "Journey North (6)"; 46. "Journey North (7)"; 47. "Journey North (8)"; 48. "Journey North (9)"; 49. "Journey North (10)"; 50. "Finally In Aizu"
07	Hot Pursuit!	June 6, 2007; 978-4-06-361562-3	November 24, 2009 (Del Rey Manga); October 18, 2016 (digital) (Kodansha USA); 978-0-345-50423-4 (Del Rey Manga); 978-1-68-233363-1 (Kodansha USA)
08	—	September 6, 2007; 978-4-06-361591-3	February 28, 2017 (digital); 978-1-682-33472-0
09	—	January 4, 2008; 978-4-06-361635-4	March 14, 2017 (digital); 978-1-682-33473-7
10	—	April 4, 2008; 978-4-06-361657-6	March 28, 2017 (digital); 978-1-682-33474-4
11	—	August 6, 2008; 978-4-06-361689-7	April 11, 2017 (digital); 978-1-682-33644-1

== Reception ==
In Jason Thompson's online appendix to Manga: The Complete Guide, he praised the layouts of the manga, and described the character designs as "reminiscent of Go Nagai". Theron Martin, writing for Anime News Network about the first two volumes, enjoyed the attention to historical detail, but felt the character designs were "overly harsh". A.E. Sparrow, writing for IGN, appreciated the distinct character designs for the women and their enemies. In a 2007 reader poll of Seinen manga by About.com, The Yagyu Ninja Scrolls won sixth place.
