= Yōkaiden =

Original English-language manga

- Volume 1 released on November 18, 2008
- Genre: Fantasy
- Author: Nina Matsumoto
- Publisher: Del Rey Manga
- Demographic: Teens
- Original run: 2008 – present
- Volumes: 2

Yōkaiden is an original English-language manga written and illustrated by Nina Matsumoto and published by Del Rey Manga. The story features Hamachi, a boy fascinated by the Japanese monsters called yokai. When one of these monsters steals his grandmother's soul, he travels into their world to retrieve it. The first volume was published on November 18, 2008, and as of November 24, 2009, two volumes were released.

== Plot ==
Although yōkai (a class of Japanese monsters) are feared and hunted, Hamachi believes that humans can peacefully coexist with the spirits. When Hamachi releases a kappa from one of his grandmother's traps, having to remove its leg to do so, it later returns for revenge against his grandmother and steals her soul. Hamachi then travels into the yokai's world to retrieve her soul. However, he could end up trapped in the realm as well.

== Production ==
Nina Matsumoto had already received attention for her DeviantArt gallery. After a deal with Bongo Comics and an interview with The Toronto Star, she caught the attention of Dallas Middaugh an associate publisher at Del Rey Manga. After reading her web comic Saturnalia, he asked her for a proposal and she created the initial Yōkaiden concept. Middaugh comments that the concept "was pretty much ready to go" without much change. Middaugh mentions that the protagonist Hamachi reminds him of Son Goku as he was portrayed in the original Dragon Ball series.

== Reception ==
Yōkaiden has been well received by critics. About.com's Deb Aoki considered it to be the best original English language manga of 2008. She commended the series for having "well-developed characters that have interesting personalities and fun chemistry with each other". Coolstreak Cartoons' Leroy Douresseaux commends the artist for her artwork saying that it "has a lively, fluid feel similar to animation, while her character and creature design is quirky". Carlo Santos of Anime News Network feels the series has "a bold sense of line, striking visual designs and clearly defined layouts" and says that Matsumoto's strength is in her dialogue. However, Santos believes that the series "falls short of a truly haunting atmosphere" due to the humor, which sometimes breaks the fourth wall. Erin Finnegan of PopCultureShock says that she "can't stop talking about how hilarious" Yōkaiden is; she also believes it is the best OEL/World manga of 2008. Brigid Alverson from GraphicNovelReporter.com comments that Matsumoto draws the characters with an exaggerated style, bringing out the characters' personalities and depicting the odd creatures with imagination and flair. Alverson also says that a great deal of information is delivered "rather painlessly". She believes that those who enjoy Pokémon or Hayao Miyazaki's Spirited Away will enjoy Yōkaiden.
