= Yozakura Quartet =

Japanese manga series

- First tankōbon volume cover, featuring Hime Yarizakura

夜桜四重奏 ～ヨザクラカルテット～ (Yozakura Karutetto)
- Genre: Action, supernatural
- Manga
- Written by: Suzuhito Yasuda
- Published by: Kodansha
- English publisher: NA: Del Rey Manga (former); Kodansha USA (current; digital)
- Magazine: Monthly Shōnen Sirius
- Original run: January 26, 2006 – July 26, 2025
- Volumes: 34
- Anime television series
- Directed by: Kou Matsuo
- Written by: Jukki Hanada
- Music by: Akio Dobashi
- Studio: Nomad
- Licensed by: NA: Sentai Filmworks
- Original network: BS-i, MBS, TBS
- Original run: October 2, 2008 – December 18, 2008
- Episodes: 12
- Original video animation

Yozakura Quartet: Hoshi no Umi
- Directed by: Ryochimo Sawa
- Written by: Manabu Ishikawa
- Studio: Tatsunoko Production; Studio Rikka (#1–2)
- Released: October 8, 2010 – November 9, 2011
- Episodes: 3
- Anime television series

Yozakura Quartet: Hana no Uta
- Directed by: Ryochimo Sawa
- Written by: Manabu Ishikawa
- Studio: Tatsunoko Production
- Original network: Tokyo MX, Sun TV
- Original run: October 6, 2013 – January 1, 2014
- Episodes: 13
- Original video animation

Yozakura Quartet: Tsuki ni Naku
- Directed by: Ryochimo Sawa
- Written by: Manabu Ishikawa
- Studio: Tatsunoko Production
- Released: October 9, 2013 – November 7, 2014
- Episodes: 3
- Manga

YZQ ✕ DRRR!!
- Written by: Suzuhito Yasuda
- Published by: Kodansha
- Published: December 18, 2013
- icon

Yozakura Quartet (Japanese: 夜桜四重奏 ～ヨザクラカルテット～, Hepburn: Yozakura Karutetto; 'Cherry Blossoms at Night Quartet') is a Japanese manga series written and illustrated by Suzuhito Yasuda. It was serialized in Kodansha's shōnen manga magazine Monthly Shōnen Sirius from January 2006 to July 2025, with its chapters collected in 34 tankōbon volumes. In North America, the manga was first licensed by Del Rey Manga, and later by Kodansha USA for a digital-only release.

A 12-episode anime television series adaptation, produced by Nomad, was broadcast from October to December 2008. A three-episode original video animation (OVA) series was released between October 2010 and November 2011. A second 13-episode anime television series, titled Yozakura Quartet: Hana no Uta, was broadcast from October 2013 to January 2014. Another three-episode OVA series, titled Yozakura Quartet: Tsuki ni Naku, was released from October 2013 to November 2014.

== Story ==
The story revolves around four teenagers; Hime, Akina, Ao, and Kotoha; each of them having their own unique abilities. They run an office called Hiizumi Life Counseling Office, where their job is to help and protect the townspeople of Sakurashin, a town where humans and youkai co-exist. The town is protected by a barrier created by the spiritual sakura known as The Seven Pillars. The Seven Pillars exist in both the human world and the youkai world and is the only thing that keeps both worlds connected to each other. However, recent bizarre incidents have occurred in their town and someone has threatened its safety. It is up to the four of them to protect the town they love.

== Characters ==
Hime Yarizakura (槍桜 ヒメ, Yarizakura Hime)
Voiced by: Misato Fukuen
Hime is a 16-year-old high school girl and mayor of her city, believed to be the reincarnation of an ancient dragon. She assumed leadership after her grandmother was "tuned" by Akina's grandfather. Her long scarf, made by Akina, conceals a scar that seals most of her yōkai power. The townspeople's memories of her true nature were erased at her request but later restored during a political conflict. Trained in her grandmother's methods, Hime patrols daily and fights using improvised weapons like a lacrosse racket. Though stern, she cares deeply for her city. She enjoys eating, particularly Akina's cooking, and was childhood friends with Gin.
Akina Hiizumi (比泉 秋名, Hiizumi Akina)
Voiced by: Yuki Kaji
Akina, an 18-year-old city employee, directs the Hiizumi Life Counseling Office as its only human staff member. He possesses the hereditary "tuning" ability to sever connections between worlds and return yōkai to their realm. Using this power makes his hair grow longer. As the current oyakume, he follows the tradition of successors tuning their predecessors, having already performed this duty for his grandfather. Some yōkai resent this ability, viewing it as destructive. Akina maintains this cycle to preserve balance between the human and supernatural worlds.
Ao Nanami (七海 アオ, Nanami Ao)
Voiced by: Saki Fujita
Ao is a 15-year-old Satori who works at the office and serves as the town announcer. Her cat ears function as antennas, typically concealed under hats or headphones. She possesses telepathic abilities, enabling her to read thoughts, communicate with animals, and anticipate opponents' moves. Her enhanced "Satellite" form allows her to read the entire city's thoughts simultaneously, though it exhausts her. Though a glutton like Hime, Ao shows restraint. Her older brother Gin disappeared before the series began and later becomes Enjin's vessel.
Kotoha Isone (五十音 ことは, Isone Kotoha)
Voiced by: Miyuki Sawashiro
Kotoha is a 16-year-old hanyō (half-human, half-yōkai) who gained her supernatural nature after a possession in childhood. As a rare Kotodama user, she brings words to life, conjuring objects or weapons with single words or elaborate spells. Her abilities extend to animating text from books. A firearms enthusiast, she once traveled to Germany specifically to visit a military museum. While known among friends for her singing talent, Kotoha openly identifies as lesbian. Though she wears non-prescription glasses, her composed demeanor shifts dramatically in anger—once manifesting an artillery piece during a heated moment. Her powers drain her stamina significantly; overuse risks voice loss or unconsciousness. Her surname references the gojūon system, reflecting her word-based abilities.
Enjin Hiizumi (比泉 円神, Hiizumi Enjin)
Voiced by: Tomokazu Seki
Enjin originates from the Hiizumi branch family that was tuned centuries ago by the main household. Now existing as a non-corporeal entity, he possesses Gin's body to seek vengeance. His goal involves forcing the seven pillars to bloom, merging the human and yōkai worlds. While initially limited to Gin's Satori abilities, Enjin wields "Striking"—the inverse of Akina's tuning—to summon objects from the yōkai realm. After mastering exorcism techniques, he removes his power's physical constraints. Though capable of limited tuning, his abilities remain inferior to Akina's. Enjin's actions stem from centuries of resentment toward the Hiizumi main family's practices.
Kyōsuke Kishi (岸 恭助, Kishi Kyōsuke)
Voiced by: Daisuke Ono
Kyōsuke is an 18-year-old oni who serves as Hime's assistant. His superhuman strength is restrained by a placebo-effect bracelet seal—it remains effective as long as he remembers his true nature. Removing it reveals his horns and full power. Initially critical of Akina, believing him to have failed as oyakume, their relationship evolves after Akina proves otherwise. The two share a contentious friendship, with Akina frequently teasing Kyōsuke about his close relationship with his sister. Their origins differ fundamentally from humans and yōkai, as they manifested from centuries of collective belief in oni legends rather than conventional birth.
Tōka Kishi (岸 桃華, Kishi Tōka)
Voiced by: Haruka Tomatsu
Tōka is Kyōsuke's 16-year-old sister and fellow employee at Hiizumi Life Counseling. Like her brother, she possesses superhuman strength as a yōkai. However, unlike Kyōsuke, she cannot fully control her power even with a restraining seal, as she frequently forgets her true nature. She develops romantic feelings for Akina, which displeases her protective older brother.
Rin Azuma (東 鈴, Azuma Rin)
Voiced by: Ai Matayoshi
Rin is a 15-year-old jiangshi who relocated to the city after being hunted by humans. Zakuro, a necromancer, became her first friend and protector. Her undead nature requires her to wear special name tags—without them, she reverts to an immobile corpse state. The tags also eliminate her need for sleep, though she continues wearing them each morning out of habit. Having spent years homeless and persecuted, Rin developed a fear of starry skies and initially despised humanity due to childhood bullying. Akina's intervention changed her perspective, and she now works at a delivery service while gradually overcoming her traumatic past.
Zakuro Kurumaki (狂巻 ざくろ, Kurumaki Zakuro)
Voiced by: Kaoru Mizuhara
Zakuro, a necromancer, was Rin's first friend and the initial demon hunter to attack Sakurashin. Her abilities allow control over deceased beings and certain yokai, including Rin's movements regardless of whether Rin wears her name tags. After the conflict, Zakuro joined Rin at the delivery store but remained haunted by fears of expulsion from Sakurashin. These anxieties persisted even after gaining official residence status in the city.
Yūhi Shinatsuhiko (士夏彦 雄飛, Shinatsuhiko Yūhi)
Voiced by: Sachi Matsumoto
Yuhi, Sakurashin's District Mayor, appears as a young boy but has overseen the city for over 200 years as a powerful Land God feared by Enjin and his followers. Though his sister holds the official title of Sakurashin's land goddess as the first to take root there, Yuhi serves as Mariabelle's personal protector god, demonstrating that deities can safeguard more than just territory. He maintains his youthful form primarily for Mariabelle's preference, adopting an older appearance only for official duties. Yuhi displays playful tendencies, enjoying Mariabelle's cosplays and showing romantic interest in Rin. His character suggests he may have preceded Yae as Sakurashin's land god.
Mariabelle (マリアベル, Mariaberu)
Voiced by: Rie Tanaka
Mariabelle serves as assistant to Yuhi, the District Mayor. Though appearing human, she gained immortality 200 years ago when her father, Victor Frankenstein, resurrected her to develop a cure for her village's plague. When she and her father later sought tuning in Sakurashin to avoid persecution from other half-yōkai, Yuhi intervened and became her protector instead. In gratitude, she became his permanent assistant. Known for wearing various cosplay outfits at Yuhi's request—an activity she secretly enjoys—Mariabelle maintains strong preferences about her routine, particularly insisting on Japanese breakfasts. She strongly favors Yuhi's youthful form over his older appearance, often expressing displeasure when he assumes his more mature guise for official duties.
Yae Shinatsuhiko (士夏彦 八重, Shinatsuhiko Yae)
Voiced by: Natsuko Kuwatani
Yae, the land goddess of Sakurashin, is Yuhi's younger sister whom she addresses as aniki. Typically dressed as a sword-wielding nun, she carries twin katana and demonstrates formidable skill with her "Spring Wind" (名東風, Haru Kaze) technique capable of bisecting vehicles. Despite her divine status and combat prowess, she displays an unexpected fondness for bears and plush toys—even wearing a bear costume helmet during a robbery intervention. Originally created centuries ago by Yuhi to serve as Sakurashin's guardian deity, Yae initially resisted taking root in order to accompany her brother. She finally assumed her destined role as land goddess during the Walking Pilgrimage arc, establishing herself as the city's protector.
V Juli F (V・じゅり・F, Vī Juri Efu)
Voiced by: Aiko Ōkubo
A nurse who operates a clinic in Sakurashin while hosting her own television program, the Juli Channel. Though appearing human, she possesses unusual abilities—including the capacity to "re-tune" Akina through physical contact, a feat she claims any human could theoretically perform. Her connection to the supernatural extends through her lineage as both a descendant of Victor Frankenstein and Mariabelle's great-grandniece. Previously serving as young Hime's assistant during the mayor's childhood transition, Juli overcame an early obsession with prematurely asserting her ancestral legacy after a formative encounter with Hime's grandmother. Now maintaining her clinic and media presence, she corresponds with her England-based parents through traditional letters while following her mother's online writings.
V Lila F (V・りら・F, Vī Rira Efu)
Voiced by: Ai Kayano
Juli's younger sister and a skilled magician capable of feigning death by stopping her own heartbeat—a trick she used to fake her demise and secretly become a yokai hunter. She harbored resentment toward Juli during her sister's medical studies, repeatedly attempting (and failing) to divert Juli's attention from textbooks with magic performances. Like Zakuro, Lila ultimately reforms after reconciling with Juli and becomes her assistant at the clinic.
Kohime Sakurano (桜野 小姫, Sakurano Kohime)
Voiced by: Yui Ogura
Kohime is Hime's nine-year-old cousin who attempted to run for mayor in a neighboring town despite being underage for the position.

== Media ==
=== Manga ===
Written and illustrated by Suzuhito Yasuda, Yozakura Quartet was serialized in Kodansha's shōnen manga magazine Monthly Shōnen Sirius from January 26, 2006, to July 26, 2025. (Note: It debuted in the magazine's March 2006 issue, released on January 26 of that same year.) Kodansha collected its chapters in 34 tankōbon volumes, released from September 22, 2006, to August 7, 2025.

In North America, the manga was licensed by Del Rey Manga. Only five volumes were released from February 26, 2008, to September 29, 2009, before Del Rey Manga's closure in 2010. Kodansha USA started publishing the manga digitally on August 2, 2016; the sixth volume released on November 22, 2016, and the last one on March 10, 2026.

A 25-page crossover manga with Durarara!! was offered to those who bought both the Shooting Star Carnaval Side: Yozakura Quartet and Shooting Star Bebop Side: Durarara!! artbooks, released on June 30, 2011. Another 100-page special collaboration manga with Durarara!!, titled YZQ ✕ DRRR!!, was included with the first Blu-ray/DVD volume of the Yozakura Quartet: Hana no Uta anime series, released on December 18, 2013.

=== Anime ===
An anime adaption of the manga aired on TBS in October 2008. The anime was produced by Nomad. The anime has been licensed in North America by Sentai Filmworks and is distributed by Section23 Films. The complete collection was released March 2, 2010.

On March 23, 2010, manga creator Suzuhito Yasuda announced that a new anime adaption that would start in October coinciding with the ninth volume of the manga. The cast from the first series returned for this series. The first original animation video (OVA) shipped on October 8. A second episode was released along with the 10th volume on April 8, 2011 and the third with the 11th on September 9, 2011. On April 4, 2013, it was announced that another three-episode OVA, Yozakura Quartet: Tsuki ni Naku, was in production and would be released with the limited edition volumes of the 14th, 15th, and 16th volumes of the manga. They were released on September 9, 2013, February 7, 2014, and November 7, 2014. Also on April 4, 2013, it was announced that Yozakura Quartet would get a new TV anime adaptation as well, animated by Tatsunoko Production. On April 9, 2013, the title was confirmed as Yozakura Quartet: Hana no Uta. On April 11, 2013, it was confirmed that Yozakura Quartet: Hana no Uta would feature the same cast as the first series, and would not be a continuation from the first series, but rather, a complete new series on its own. It aired 13 episodes between October 6, 2013, and January 1, 2014.
