= Del Rey Manga =

Defunct publishing imprint of Del Rey Books

- Parent company: Del Rey Books (Random House)
- Founded: 2004; 22 years ago
- Defunct: 2010; 16 years ago
- Successor: Kodansha Comics
- Country of origin: United States
- Headquarters location: New York City
- Publication types: Books
- Fiction genres: Manga
- Owner: Bertelsmann
- Official website: Official website

Del Rey Manga was the manga-publishing imprint of Del Rey Books, a branch of Ballantine Books, which in turn is part of Random House, the publishing division of Bertelsmann.

== History ==
Del Rey Manga was formed as part of a cross-publishing relationship with Japanese publisher Kodansha. Some of the Del Rey titles, such as Tsubasa Chronicle and xxxHolic, are published in the United Kingdom by Tanoshimi. Tricia Narwani, the editor of Del Rey, stated that "Del Rey finds most of its talent through conventions and existing professional contacts".

In October 2010, Kodansha and Random House announced that the US division of Kodansha, Kodansha USA, will take over publishing over all Del Rey Manga titles as well as their own manga, starting on December 1. Random House will act as the sales and marketing distributor.

== Titles ==
Del Rey made its debut in May 2004 with four manga titles:

- Mobile Suit Gundam Seed (Kidō Senshi Gundam SEED) – by Masatsugu Iwase
- Negima! Magister Negi Magi (Mahō Sensei Negima!) – by Ken Akamatsu
- Tsubasa: Reservoir Chronicle – by Clamp
- xxxHolic – by Clamp

It has since then licensed additional titles:

- A Perfect Day for Love Letters (Koibumi Biyori) – by George Asakura
- Air Gear – by Oh! great
- Code:Breaker – by Akimine Kamijyo
- Alive (manga) – by Tadashi Kawashima (story) and Adachitoka (art)
- Dragon Eye – by Kairi Fujiyama
- ES (Eternal Sabbath) – by Fuyumi Soryo
- Fairy Navigator Runa – by Miyoko Ikeda (story) and Michiyo Kikuta (art)
- Fairy Tail – by Hiro Mashima
- Free Collars Kingdom – by Takuya Fujima
- Gacha Gacha – by Hiroyuki Tamakoshi
- Gacha Gacha: The Next Revolution – by Hiroyuki Tamakoshi
- Gakuen Prince – by Jun Yuzuki
- Gankutsuou: The Count of Monte Cristo – by Mahiro Maeda
- Genshiken – by Shimoku Kio
- Ghost Hunt – by Shiho Inada (story and art) and Fuyumi Ono (original novel)
- Guru Guru Pon-chan – by Satomi Ikezawa
- Haridama Magic Cram School by Atsushi Suzumi
- Hell Girl (Jigoku Shōjo) – by Miyuki Eto
- Kagetora – by Akira Segami
- Kamichama Karin Chu – by Koge-Donbo
- Kitchen Princess – by Miyuki Kobayashi (story) and Natsumi Ando (art)
- Koko ni iru yo! – by Ema Toyama
- Kujibiki Unbalance – by Shimoku Kio (story) and Keito Koume (art)
- Kurogane – by Kei Toume
- Le Chevalier D'Eon – by Tow Ubukata (original creator) and Kiriko Yumeji (art)
- Love Roma – by Minoru Toyoda
- Mamotte! Lollipop – by Michiyo Kikuta
- Mao-Chan – by Ken Akamatsu (story) and RAN (art)
- Me and the Devil Blues – by Akira Hiramoto
- Mermaid Melody Pichi Pichi Pitch – by Michiko Yokote (story) and Pink Hanamori (art)
- Minima! – by Machiko Sakurai
- Mobile Suit Gundam SEED Destiny – by Masatsuga Iwase
- Moyasimon: Tales of Agriculture – by Masayuki Ishikawa
- Mushishi – by Yuki Urushibara
- My Heavenly Hockey Club – by Ai Morinaga
- Negima! Neo – by Ken Akamatsu (story) and Takuya Fujiyama (art)
- Night Head Genesis – by George Ida (story) and You Higuri (art)
- Nodame Cantabile – by Tomoko Ninomiya
- Othello – by Satomi Ikezawa
- Papillon – by Miwa Ueda
- Parasyte (Kiseiju) – by Hitoshi Iwaaki
- Pastel – by Toshihiko Kobayashi
- Pink Innocent – by Kotori Momoyuki
- Princess Resurrection (Kaibutsu Ōjo) – by Yasunori Mitsunaga
- Psycho Busters – by Yuya Aoki (story) and Akinari Nao (art)
- Pumpkin Scissors – by Ryōtarō Iwanaga
- Q·Ko-Chan: The Earth Invader Girl – by Hajime Ueda
- Rave Master – by Hiro Mashima
- Samurai 7 – by Akira Kurosawa
- Sayonara, Zetsubou-Sensei – by Koji Kumeta
- School Rumble – by Jin Kobayashi
- Shiki Tsukai – by To-Ru Zekuu
- Shugo Chara! – by Peach-Pit
- Sugar Sugar Rune – by Moyoco Anno
- Train Man (Densha Otoko) – by Machiko Ocha
- The Wallflower (also known as Perfect Girl Evolution or My Fair Lady) – by Tomoko Hayakawa
- Phoenix Wright: Ace Attorney (based on the Nintendo DS game series) – by Kenji Kuroda
- Yokaiden by Nina Matsumoto
- Yozakura Quartet by Suzuhito Yasuda

=== Mature line ===
In early December 2005, it was announced that Del Rey Manga would begin publishing a mature line of manga. It included:

- Basilisk – by Futaro Yamada (story) and Masaki Segawa (art)
- The Yagyu Ninja Scrolls – by Masaki Segawa
- Suzuka – by Kōji Seo

=== OEL titles ===
Del Rey also publishes the following original English-language manga (OEL) titles:

- Bakugan Battle Brawlers
- Ben 10: Alien Force
- In Odd We Trust
- Kasumi (comic) – by Surt Lim (story) and Hirofumi Sugimoto (art)
- Yōkaiden
- King of RPGs

=== Light novels ===
In December 2007, Del Ray announced that they would begin licensing light novels, in addition to manga. However, several of the titles that were later announced never saw release. Among the titles announced and released were:

- Zaregoto series volumes 1 and 2
- ×××Holic AnotherHolic Landolt-Ring Aerosol
- The Garden of Sinners (announced, but never released)
- Sohryuden: Legend of the Dragon Kings (announced, but never released)

In addition, Del Rey released two volumes of the Faust literary magazine. These volumes featured several short stories and excerpts from several light novel series which were never fully licensed by Del Rey. This includes the first chapter of the unreleased Garden of Sinners translation, as well as the first chapter of Nisio Isin's Shin Honkaku Mahō Shōjo Risuka series. Cover art for both volumes was drawn by Take, artist of the Zaregoto series.

=== Partnership with Marvel ===
Del Rey Manga teamed up with Marvel Comics to produce manga versions of their titles (previous attempts, like Marvel Mangaverse and X-Men: The Manga, had variable success). Titles confirmed are:

- Wolverine: Prodigal Son by writer Antony Johnston, with art by Wilson Tortosa
- X-Men Misfits by writers Raina Telgemeier and Dave Roman, with art by Anzu
