= Haridama Magic Cram School =

Japanese manga one-shot

- First English edition of Haridama Magic Cram School as published by Del Rey Manga

はりだま退魔塾 (Haridama Taimajuku)
- Genre: Supernatural
- Manga
- Written by: Atsushi Suzumi
- Published by: Kodansha
- English publisher: NA: Del Rey Manga
- Magazine: Monthly Shōnen Sirius
- Published: December 22, 2005
- Volumes: 1

Haridama Magic Cram School (Japanese: はりだま退魔塾, Hepburn: Haridama Taimajuku) is a one-shot Japanese manga written and illustrated by Atsushi Suzumi. The manga was serialized in Kodansha's shōnen magazine, Monthly Shōnen Sirius, ending the serialization at 5 chapters. The individual chapters were collected by Kodansha into one tankōbon volume which was released on December 22, 2005. The manga is licensed in North America by Del Rey Manga, which published the manga on May 20, 2008. It is also licensed in Taiwan by Sharp Point Press.

== Plot ==
Apprentice sorcery students, Kokuyo and Harika, require contact with an obsidian orb to effectively use their yin-yang magic. Due to this disadvantage, they are considered inferior to "normal" sorcery students. Discouraged by his status, Kokuyo often skips his teacher and adopter, Sekiei's class to show off his magical skills on the street. Harika, on the other hand, is studious and often has to drag Kokuyo back to class. Kokuyo's rival, Nekome, a third-level sorcerer, arrives to taunt Kokuyo about his obsidian status and to insult Sekiei for adopting an obsidian baby and attempt to train him into a sorcerer. When Harika slaps him for doing so, Nekome tries to gain Harika's affections although she is oblivious to his attempts. Kokuyo and Harika work together in the third-level sorcery exam to inadvertently defeat a first-level monster and pass the exam spectacularly.

== Production and release ==
Haridama Magical Cram School is written and illustrated by Atsushi Suzumi. The manga was serialized in Kodansha's shōnen magazine, Monthly Shōnen Sirius ending the serialization at 5 chapters. Kodansha released the manga's single tankōbon on December 22, 2005. The manga is licensed in North America by Del Rey Manga, which released the manga's single tankōbon volume on May 20, 2008. The manga is licensed in Taiwan by Sharp Point Press, which released the manga's single tankōbon on March 6, 2007. Atsushi Suzumi comments that Haridama Magic Cram School was meant to be written in "short manga form". However requests from editors to make the manga "something a bit longer" resulted in the manga being a short series.

=== Chapter listing ===
No.	Original release date	Original ISBN	English release date	English ISBN
1	December 22, 2005	978-4-06-373006-7	May 20, 2008	978-0-345-50136-3
First Period: "The Obsidian Complex"; Second Period: "Game On!"; Third Period: "Adventure in the Moonlight"; Fourth Period: "A Path of My Own"; Fifth Period: "The Pledge and Moving On"

== Reception ==
Mania.com's Nadia Oxford comments that "the split between swords and magic, the discovery of hidden powers and the usual lessons about teamwork and friendship" in the manga is similar to J.K. Rowling's Harry Potter. Comics Worth Reading's Ed Sizemore commends the author for her artwork in the manga saying that the character's faces, hair, and clothes are greatly detailed due to delicate linework. About.com's Deb Aoki commends the manga for having "male and female leads who are true friends and equals". Comics Village's John Thomas commends the manga for being concise. Jason Thompson's online appendix to Manga: The Complete Guide criticises the manga artist "Suzumi (Venus Versus Virus) draws cute faces but fails on the scenery and action scenes".
