= Michiru Satou =

Japanese voice actor (born 1980)

- 佐藤 ミチル
- Born: 16 February 1980 (age 45); Tokyo, Japan
- Occupation: Voice actor
- Agent: T's Factory
- Spouse: Ayumi Tsuji (m. 2017)

Michiru Satou (佐藤 ミチル, Satō Michiru; born 16 February 1980) is a Japanese voice actor represented with T's Factory. He is from Tokyo. He graduated from the Amusement Media Academy, in which he was classmates with Takashi Kondō and Go Inoue. On 7 July 2017, he married voice actress Ayumi Tsuji.

== Appearances ==
Bold denotes the main character.

=== TV anime ===
- Kaleido Star (Chris, Vince, reporter, animal cast member, couple man, Dick, cast member, man, operator)
- Kaleido Star: New Wings (Charlie, Vince, reporter, assistant director)
- Kimi ga Aruji de Shitsuji ga Ore de (Unbeliever (3))
- Soreike! Zukkoke (Fumi Minamoto)
- Paboo & Mojies (**Peter Pig**)
- Play Ball (Igarashi)
- Lemon Angel Project (Hajime Saginomiya)
- Yofukashi no Uta (Matsuda)

=== Video games ===
- Darling II Backlash (Kazuhiro Iwato)
- Signal (Kazuhiro Iwato)
- Project Sylpheed (Brandon Shore)

=== Radio ===
- Radio de Anime Tamashī
- Radio BS11 (voice of BS11's official character Juuitchan)

=== Stage ===
- Engeki Shūdan Chicken Run 3rd performance (dual lead/Altair Collins)
