= Uniminipet =

South Korean animated series

- Genre: Fantasy; Comedy; Adventure
- Written by: Kim Ju-yeon (김주연)
- Directed by: Park Woo-hyeon (박우현)
- Theme music composer: Jang Seung-jun (장승준); Jeon Hong-jun (전홍준)
- Opening theme: "UniMinipet" by Park Beom-jun (박범준), Park Jeong-eun (박점은), Kim Hee-jin (김희진) and Oh Hye-seung (우혜승)
- Composer: Seol Ki-tae (설기태)
- Country of origin: South Korea
- Original language: Korean
- No. of seasons: 1
- No. of episodes: 26

Production
- Running time: 22 min.
- Production company: Dong Woo A&E Co. Ltd.

Original release
- Network: SBS
- Release: June 15 – December 7, 2001

UniMinipet (Korean: 유니미니펫) is a South Korean aeni produced by DongWoo Animation. It aired on SBS and seven local private broadcasting networks from June 15, 2001 to December 7, 2001.

The series follows Won Dong-woo, an elementary school student who accidentally connects his family’s robotic pet shop to a four-dimensional realm called Uniland. Alongside two secret agents inhabiting robotic pet bodies, Dong-woo must hunt down rogue "Bugpets" that have escaped into the human world and search for mystical Unistones to restore the agents' powers.

== Plot ==
Elementary school student Won Dong-woo has a strange feeling whenever he opens the closet door in his bedroom, although everyone does not believe him when he explains it. Only he can sense this feeling, because he is destined to open the door. His closet is actually a secret portal that connects to a four-dimensional realm called Uniland, a world where creatures known as the "Unipets" live. One day, "Bugpets" wanted for committing crimes in Uniland escape to the human world and hide inside the Robo Pets in Dong-woo's Robo Pet shop. Uniland dispatches two special agents, Goyang and Ham, to the human world to catch the Bugpets, and the two inevitably end up in Dong-woo's closet. However, they encounter a problem; only souls can pass through the door. Therefore the agents decide to hide inside the Robo Pets just like the Bugpets did. Since they lose their power while being transferred to another world, they search for the Unistones to recover them and, at the same time, upgrade themselves. As a result, they team up with Dong-woo and go on a mission to eradicate the Bugpets.

== Characters ==
- Won Dong-woo (원동우; voiced by Lee Seong) is a pleasant, responsible and cheerful 10-year-old elementary school student who lives with his mother Go Eun-bi, who runs a Robo Pet shop. Since his dad died in an accident three years ago, he has been helping his mother with household chores. However, since Eun-bi makes particularly frequent mistakes during chores and while running the shop, it can be said that Dong-woo is actually doing all the work. His school grades are always at the top because he finds school work much easier than housework. One day, he opens the closet door in his room, and the Bugpets who committed crimes in Uniland escape to the human world. Goyang and Ham, the Uniland agents chasing the Bugpets, also end up in the human world. The closet is a portal connecting Uniland and the human world, and Dong-woo is the only one who can open the door, getting a strange feeling when he does so. If someone other than the person who can open the door opens it, it appears to be a regular closet. After meeting Goyang and Ham, they actively cooperate in the Bugpet eradication operation. He wears the Gatekeeper's Pendant given to him by his father, which is processed and converted into a magnetic ring. In the webtoon, his personality has not changed much, but he seems to be suffering from an illness due to being in his middle school years. When he is mentally cornered, he fills a speech bubble with phrases that make his hands and feet tremble, and then he falters, but Goyang and Ham stop him. Dong-woo is named after the animation company that produced the series, DongWoo Animation.
- Yu Mi-ran (유미란; voiced by Cha Myung-hwa) is Ahn Woo-soo's cousin and the daughter of a rich family. She never gets along with Woo-soo, who is conceited and ignores his innocent friends. She has a crush on Dong-woo and always defends him and Park Sang-hyun when Woo-soo argues with the former, but he only sees Dong-woo as a close friend and is indifferent to romantic relationships. Mi-ran unconditionally participates and helps Dong-woo in anything he does, playing the role of a helpful mentor at the beginning of the series. However, as Seong Jin-ah and Sa Yu-ri appeared in the middle of the series, she was pushed into the background, and is shown often becoming jealous of them.
- Park Sang-hyun (박상현; voiced by Lim Eun-jeong) is a close friend of Dong-woo and the only one who knows about the Bug pet eradication operation. Although his mathematical studies are low, he has a strong sense of justice and trustworthiness, and is of great help to Dong-woo, and works with Dr. Isanghae, Jin-ah and Yu-ri to return the Bugpets that have crossed over from Uniland to the human world.
- Goyang (고양; voiced by Kim Kwan-jin) is a female special agent and Dong-woo's partner. She says that in Uniland she was a beautiful woman with a voluptuous glamorous body and tall stature, a fact that has not been confirmed at all. She is quite dissatisfied with being turned into a cat Robo Pet. She seems to be having a hard time controlling Ham, who is unruly in everything. Goyang has a bratty, proud, selfish and spontaneous personality, is a nag, and often fights with Ham over trivial things. Although she has a strong ego and a temper, she also has a reasonable side. Even in her peaceful daily life, she watches the news and collects various information, so unlike Ham, she appears to be sincere in her work. In the webtoon, she goes on vacation and stays in the human world for a while with Ham, though their relationship does not seem to have changed much. It is said that when she was young, she had a complex because she had a large physique for a girl.
- Ham (햄; voiced by Cha Myung-hwa) is a male special agent and Dong-woo's partner. He has a carefree and easy-going personality, and has arguments with Goyang. He has loved food since he was in Uniland, so he looks for food even in his hamster Robo Pet form. However, if he eats food, his Robo Pet breaks down, much to Goyang and Dr. Isanghae's annoyance. He likes comic books, television, animation and pop genres such as idol singers. He may be a Uniland agent, but plays an active role in Bugpet cases. However, he is too careless and condescending. In the webtoon, he goes on vacation and stays in the human world for a while with Goyang, though their relationship does not seem to have changed much. It is said that Ham's human body in Uniland was judged unfit to be a special agent because it was small and weak. However, even though his physical abilities are inferior, he eventually became a special agent and is active, so it seems that his abilities are quite good, contrary to his appearance.
- Go Eun-bi (고은비; voiced by Lim Eun-jeong) is a 32-year-old widow and Won Dong-woo's mother. She claims to be 28 years old, contrary to her actual age. She looks so young and pretty that people who do not know her think that she is Dong-woo's older sister. She was originally a girl from a wealthy family, but they disowned her when she married Dong-woo's father, who was an orphan. However, due to her optimistic personality, she manages to live happily, running a Robo Pet shop. Since Eun-bi makes particularly frequent mistakes during household chores and when running the shop, it can be said that Dong-woo is actually doing all the work. In the webtoon, Goyang and Ham are briefly excited about the incomparable improvement in Eun-bi's cooking, but judging from Dong-woo's reaction, it seems that only the surface quality of her cooking has improved. Dong-woo seems to be having a hard time in one way or another, as his mother still has terrible housework skills.
- Dr. Isanghae (이상해 박사; voiced by Oh In-seong) is an eccentric 60-year-old scientist who lives next door to Dong-woo. He has a strong spirit of taking on new challenges, and although he is slightly hot-tempered, always gets excited when he sees something new and amazing, and sometimes causes accidents, he provides a lot of help to Goyang and Ham, such as making various inventions needed for the Bugpet eradication operation and upgrading the Unistones. Isanghae's last name in Korean means "strange" or "weird".
- Magic (매직; voiced by Kim Kwan-jin) is a man in his mid-30s. He was originally a magician, but ended up in a car accident while trying to save his Robo Pet. During the accident, a Bugpet's soul enters, but he cannot fully settle in the human body, only doing so in half of it. Since his arrest by Goyang and Ham, he has been taking care of Dong-woo's house, and falls in love with Go Eun-bi at first sight, helping her with all kinds of chores. He loves women very much, and often makes mistakes at crucial moments as a result. The name "Magic" is said to be that of a Bugpet. In the final episode, when Go Eun-bi refers to Magic by name after the Bugpet's soul has left his body, he is reminded of the magic commonly used in daily life.
- Ahn Woo-soo (안우수; voiced by Kim Jeong-ju) is Dong-woo's classmate and a boy from a rich family. He tends to openly ignore Dong-woo just because he is rich, and he has two bald twin henchmen named Bang-gu and Bang-seok. He is always condescending and is shown bragging about how much money he has in every episode. However, he is always fussy and ends up breaking down. Dong-woo just ignores him, while his friends Yu Mi-ran and Park Sang-hyun get indignant. Woo-soo's mother has the same arrogant personality as her son. It is said that, like his mother, he gets away with his actions without being properly scolded. Compared to Sa Yu-ri's family, he is an insignificant little brat. Surprisingly, the Bugpets often cause his suffering throughout the series.
- Seong Jin-ah (성진아; voiced by Lee Seon-joo) is Dong-woo's new tomboy girlfriend who appears from episode 13 onwards, replacing Yu Mi-ran, and the daughter of the police investigation team's leader. Her future dream is to become a detective. She investigates the crimes committed by the Black Rose Society, led by the Horned Rat. Although she is young, she has quite sharp reasoning skills and a tough personality for an average girl. She plays a very active role in the series, such as saving Sa Yu-ri when she is attacked by Frog, being present in the final battle with Frog at the end, and working together with Dr. Isanghae, Sang-hyun and Yu-ri to send the Bugpets that crossed into the human world back to Uniland. She is mentioned a lot by Ahn Woo-soo, Yu Mi-ran and Sa Yu-ri, who each come from a wealthy family, so it is presumed that she lives quite well here as well due to her wealth. She lives in a two-story luxury townhouse.
- Sa Yu-ri (사유리; voiced by Son Jeong-ah) is a girl who goes to the same elementary school as Dong-woo. First appearing in episode 20, she is from a rich family, wears Chinese-style clothing, and lives in a house bigger than Ahn Woo-soo's. Although she has a passive, delicate, and quiet personality, it is difficult for people around her to approach her because she is the daughter of a chaebol. Yu-ri is lonely and has few friends. She seems to secretly like Dong-woo, and her appearance is almost identical to that of Yu Mi-ran. Because of her cute appearance, she was somewhat popular when episode 20 aired. Unlike Ahn Woo-soo, who is rich but always shows off, in terms of personality, she never arbitrarily ignores others or shows off, and is a truly quiet girl from a wealthy family. Since her parents are busy working abroad on Robo Pets, she spends most of her day with her childhood Robo Pet Frog, whom she names "John". While Dong-woo is the one who can open the closet door connecting Uniland to the human world, Yu-ri is the exact opposite of that, being the one who closes the door. Just as Dong-woo received his Gatekeeper's Pendant from his father, Yu-ri received hers from her grandfather, a scientist who was researching Uniland when she was young. They buried the Unistone Crystal, said to be the strongest of the Unistones, in a forest near the National Space Research Institute. However, she is betrayed by Frog at the last minute and has the crystal taken away from her, only for him to be defeated by the resonance of the powers to close and open the door. The pendant and Unistone Crystal that she had are used to send the souls of the Unipets and Bugpets back to Uniland, and she takes the purified Frog back. Since then, she has become close enough to talk to Dong-woo's friends naturally and go to school with them instead of relying on her Robo Pet.

== Voice cast ==
- Lee Seong as Won Dong-woo and Lowbat
- Kim Jeong-ju as Goyang, Ahn Woo-soo, Swanee and Ptera
- Cha Myung-hwa as Ham, Yu Mi-ran and TV Reporter
- Lim Eun-jeong as Go Eun-bi, Park Sang-hyun, Ahn Woo-soo's Mother, Mi-ran's Mother, Whirlwind Team Captain, Ji-soo, Jyuru, White Pearl, Mummy, Yamu and Koalaka
- Lee Seon-joo as Seong Jin-ah, Frog, Deojidoo, Robin, Snake Ding-Dong, Peace, Saurus, Pipi, Batpet and Scorpion
- Son Jeong-ah as Sa Yu-ri, Bitnari Team Captain, Hanbit, Kim Hyun-ah, Pori, Horned Rat, Nabangdeng, Earbat, Fairy, Styg, Lecter and Tyranno
- Oh In-seong as Dr. Isanghae, Jello Jelly, Mushmash, Chicken Poop, Hound and Lucky Ball Commentator #1
- Kim Kwan-jin as Magic, Willitel, Dimethyl, Investigation Team Leader, Koppulso, Jibdoli, Dokkaedokkae, Dong-woo's Father, Mi-ran's Father, Yu-ri's Grandfather and Lucky Ball Commentator #2
- Choi Byung-sang as Dokkaedokkae

== Episodes ==
Episode	Title	Directed by	Written by	Original release date
1	"A Birth! Unipet (탄생! 유니펫)"	Park Woo-hyeon (박우현)	Kim Ju-yeon (김주연)	June 15, 2001
2	"Catch Willitel (윌리텔을 잡아라)"	Park Woo-hyeon (박우현)	Kim Ju-yeon (김주연)	June 22, 2001
3	"You're Under Arrest, Mushmash (체포한다, 머시매쉬)"	Park Woo-hyeon (박우현)	Kim Ju-yeon (김주연)	June 29, 2001
4	"Magic the Magcian (마술사 매직마술사 매직)"	Park Woo-hyeon (박우현)	Kim Ju-yeon (김주연)	July 6, 2001
5	"Catch Pori! (뽀리를 잡아라!)"	Park Woo-hyeon (박우현)	Kim Ju-yeon (김주연)	July 13, 2001
6	"Pipi in the Bag (가방속의 피피)"	Park Woo-hyeon (박우현)	Kim Ju-yeon (김주연)	July 20, 2001
7	"Play! Lucky Ball (출전! 럭키볼)"	Park Woo-hyeon (박우현)	Kim Ju-yeon (김주연)	July 27, 2001
8	"Face the Victory King (승리왕을 상대하라)"	Park Woo-hyeon (박우현)	Kim Ju-yeon (김주연)	August 3, 2001
9	"Dong-woo's Crisis (동우의 위기)"	Park Woo-hyeon (박우현)	Kim Ju-yeon (김주연)	August 10, 2001
10	"Cliff Mountain Exploration (벼랑산 탐험)"	Park Woo-hyeon (박우현)	Kim Ju-yeon (김주연)	August 17, 2001
11	"Aim for the Championship Cup! (우승컵을 노려라!)"	Park Woo-hyeon (박우현)	Kim Ju-yeon (김주연)	August 24, 2001
12	"A New Enemy: The Black Rose Society (새로운 적 흑장미회)"	Park Woo-hyeon (박우현)	Kim Ju-yeon (김주연)	August 31, 2001
13	"The Case of the Famous Painting Theft (명화 도난 사건)"	Park Woo-hyeon (박우현)	Kim Ju-yeon (김주연)	September 7, 2001
14	"Catch Earbat (이어뱃을 잡아라)"	Park Woo-hyeon (박우현)	Kim Ju-yeon (김주연)	September 14, 2001
15	"Retrieve the Strange Egg (이상한 알을 되찾아라)"	Park Woo-hyeon (박우현)	Kim Ju-yeon (김주연)	September 21, 2001
16	"Appearance of a Sea Monster (바다괴물의 출현)"	Park Woo-hyeon (박우현)	Kim Ju-yeon (김주연)	September 28, 2001
17	"What Happened at the Campsite (캠핑장에서 생긴 일)"	Park Woo-hyeon (박우현)	Kim Ju-yeon (김주연)	October 5, 2001
18	"Protect the Blueprint (설계도를 지켜라)"	Park Woo-hyeon (박우현)	Kim Ju-yeon (김주연)	October 12, 2001
19	"The End of the Black Rose Society (흑장미의 최후)"	Park Woo-hyeon (박우현)	Kim Ju-yeon (김주연)	October 19, 2001
20	"Frog's Counterattack (프로그의 반격)"	Park Woo-hyeon (박우현)	Kim Ju-yeon (김주연)	October 26, 2001
21	"Mysterious Meteorite (수수께끼의 운석)"	Park Woo-hyeon (박우현)	Kim Ju-yeon (김주연)	November 2, 2001
22	"Fake Ham Appears (가짜햄 등장)"	Park Woo-hyeon (박우현)	Kim Ju-yeon (김주연)	November 9, 2001
23	"The Horrors in the Haunted House (유령 집의 공포)"	Park Woo-hyeon (박우현)	Kim Ju-yeon (김주연)	November 16, 2001
24	"The Horned Rat's Rebellion (뿔쥐의 반역)"	Park Woo-hyeon (박우현)	Kim Ju-yeon (김주연)	November 23, 2001
25	"Crystal Discovery (크리스탈 발견)"	Park Woo-hyeon (박우현)	Kim Ju-yeon (김주연)	November 30, 2001
26	"Farewells, and Promises (이별, 그리고 약속)"	Park Woo-hyeon (박우현)	Kim Ju-yeon (김주연)	December 7, 2001

== Reception ==
When it first aired in 2001, UniMinipet received criticism for being an imitation of anime series Pokémon and Digimon Adventure 02, and viewers expected that its schedule would not be smooth. Based on a viewership rating survey in July 2001, it received around 10%, showing its potential and ranking third after Pokémon and Digimon Adventure 02. The series surpassed the two shows with a viewership rating of 9.5% on its first run, but fell to 9th place due to a drop in ratings in the middle. Viewers noted that the early episodes, such as those related to the Lucky Ball Tournament, tended to be somewhat boring. However, as the series moved to episodes related to the Black Rose Society in its latter half, ratings gradually increased. The fast-paced story centered on the confrontation between the Bugpets and Won Dong-woo and his group was well-received. Because the patterns were fundamentally different from those of Pokémon and Digimon Adventure 02, the controversy over imitation quickly subsided. It took second place after Digimon Adventure 02 with a rating of 10.1%, with Pokémon at 9.8%. Due to the series' popularity, DongWoo Animation announced plans to produce a feature film and release it during the summer of 2002, but this fell through due to various issues such as lack of funds.

UniMinipet continued to receive high ratings throughout the early 2000s. It was rebroadcast every Friday in a two-episode format from March 19, 2004 to June 25, 2004, and aired in Turkey with the name Taşın Sırrı ("The Secret of the Stone") in 2009-2011. It also aired in China as 迷你宠物星 ("Mini Pet Stars"). 22 years after it ended, the series aired on Anione at 8:30 am every Tuesday and 1 pm every Monday, starting on August 8, 2023. The following day on August 9, 2023, it began airing on Anibox at 10 am every Wednesday.

== Other media ==
A video game based on the series, named UniMinipet (Korean: 유니미니펫), was released for Microsoft Windows in August 2001, developed by Niz Entertainment and published by DongWoo Animation and P&J Ventures. It was also released in Poland by eSotNet and MarkSoft on April 29, 2002. It is an arcade platform game similar to Hayan Ma-eum Baekgu (White Heart Baekgu) from 2000. Players can choose to control either Goyang or Ham through nine worlds, helping them reach the place where their friend is held captive. The Unipets can jump and attack the Bugpets with an infinite supply of ammunition of any objects, such as Unistones and Water Drops. The first eight worlds each have three levels, whereas the ninth has only one. Gamepressure gave the game a score of 4.4. In 2003, UniMinipet 2 (Korean: 유니미니펫2) was released, developed by Neonet and published by Fujitsu of Korea.

In 2014, DongWoo commemorated the 13th anniversary of the series' broadcast, releasing all the episodes on Naver TV. They also uploaded a webtoon to Naver, which was a sequel to the original series. The webtoon follows Won Dong-woo, now a middle school student, as he reunites with Goyang and Ham.

== See also ==
- Aeni
