= Amefurashi =

Japanese manga series

- Cover of the first Japanese volume

アメフラシ
- Manga
- Written by: Atsushi Suzumi
- Published by: Kodansha
- English publisher: Del Rey Manga
- Magazine: Monthly Shōnen Sirius
- Original run: 2006 – 2007
- Volumes: 2

Amefurashi: The Rain Goddess (アメフラシ) is a manga by Atsushi Suzumi. It was first serialized in Monthly Shōnen Sirius in Japan from 2006 to 2007 and was licensed by Del Rey Manga in North America.

== Plot ==
Gimmy, an ordinary teenager, is living in a desert town where water is scarce and survival depends on the blessings of a rain goddess. His life changes when his younger twin siblings suddenly disappear, prompting him to search for them across the harsh landscape.

During his search, Gimmy encounters Sora, the town's rain goddess, known as an "amefurashi", who is responsible for summoning rain through a sacred tree. Despite her divine role, Sora behaves like a normal, spirited girl, forming a bond with Gimmy as she helps him in his search. However, their journey is complicated by the appearance of another goddess, Ciel, who seeks to seize Sora's sacred tree in order to control the rain for herself.

== Manga ==
No.	Original release date	Original ISBN	English release date	English ISBN
1	23 January 2007	978-4-06-373055-5	23 June 2009	978-0-345-51248-2
2	23 August 2007	978-4-06-373082-1	24 November 2009	978-0-345-51249-9

== Reception ==
"While I have hope that a future volume will make use of the story's potential, the first volume is, unfortunately, unremarkable." – Thomas Zoth, Mania. "The visual storytelling shows off the mangaka's strengths nicely, though the story itself lacks the same depth of skill." – Melinda Beasi, Pop Culture Shock. "A charismatic lead character and a healthy dose of magic give this series its sparkle, but the poor story execution drags it down to a C+." – Carlo Santos, Anime News Network. "This is not great work, but the making of this manga was certainly inspired." – Leroy Douresseaux, Comic Book Bin. "Amefurashi is a fun adventure and the art style has the trademarks of Atsushi Suzumi's love for girls in various costumes." – Holly Ellingwood, Active Anime. "Interesting characters, a unique setting and the beginning of a grand adventure and struggle provide a strong initial effort." – Dan Polley, Comics Village.
