= Best Student Council =

Japanese animated television series

- Cover of the first volume of the Best Student Council manga released by MediaWorks

極上生徒会 (Gokujō Seitokai)
- Genre: Comedy, slice of life
- Manga
- Illustrated by: Mosuke Mattaku
- Published by: MediaWorks
- Magazine: Dengeki Comic Gao!
- Original run: February 2005 – December 27, 2006
- Volumes: 3
- Anime television series
- Directed by: Yoshiaki Iwasaki
- Written by: Yōsuke Kuroda
- Music by: Yoko Shimomura
- Studio: J.C.Staff
- Licensed by: NA: AEsir Holdings
- Original network: TV Tokyo; AT-X
- English network: NA: Anime Network
- Original run: April 6, 2005 – September 28, 2005
- Episodes: 26

Best Student Council (極上生徒会, Gokujō Seitokai) is a Japanese anime television series conceived by Konami and animated by J.C.Staff which originally aired on TV Tokyo from April to September 2005. A PS2 dating sim game of the same name based on the anime was also made by Konami.

The North American DVD was released by ADV Films in 2007.

== Plot ==
The story follows Rino Rando, who has been on her own since the death of her mother, Chieri, as she transfers to Miyagami Private Academy with the recommendation of her mysterious pen pal, Mr. Poppit. Shortly after her arrival, Rino surprisingly becomes a member of elite group of girls called the Best Student Council. Rino learns that Kanade Jinguji founded Miyagami Private Academy as a place where students can live free from restrictions and that the Best Student Council was formed to ensure that freedom. Best Student Council Members receive free tuition, room and board.

The story takes place at Miyagami Private Academy, a mysterious all-girl high school, its student council, the Miyagami Academy Maximum Authority Wielding Best Student Council, also known as the Best Student Council (Gokujou Seitokai), having their own Assault, Covert, and vehicle divisions. This council has more authority power than any of the faculty and staff members. The Best Student Council is divided into the four main divisions: Executive, Assault and Covert plus the Vehicle Squad. Each member of the council has their own special ability, such as special fighting techniques, the gathering of information, or weaponry such as cards, a yo-yo, or, in Rino's case, her hand puppet, Pucchan. It is revealed in an early episode that no one really knows how many members are actually in the best Student Council except the President.

== Characters ==
=== Executive members ===
Rino (Jinguuji) Rando (蘭堂りの, Randō (Jingūji) Rino)
Voiced by: Yukari Tamura (Japanese); Kira Vincent-Davis (English)
Rino is the main character of the series and, on her first day, is given the title of Secretary of Best Student Council. Among the Best Student Council, she is the one that does not have any good ability or specialty. Besides, not intelligent at all, she is very dense and slow, but she is an adorable, cheerful, friendly, and kind little girl. Kanade brings her into Best Student Council to keep Rino close with her so she can protect her. She is almost always seen with Pucchan, her hand puppet companion. Pucchan's fight ability and his power of "Burning" which he uses to fight is the reason the other member accept her to be in Best Student Council in the beginning of the series. She is also a member of Jinguuji family and has inherited the powers of the Jinguuji family but does not know about it. Her "power" is capable of sending her voice outwards to everyone in a large radius around her, when her "powers" awaken late in the series. Her mother Chieri was a member of the Jinguuji family and a former candidate of Jinguuji successor. She had the strongest "power" ever among the Jinguuji which was inherited by Rino. She ran away because she disliked the ways of the family but she kept this fact from Rino. Due to the fact she has powers as per family traditions, her true last name is probably Jinguuji but is never told this to protect her.
Near the end of the series, it is revealed that Pucchan's real identity is actually Tetsuya Rando (Randō Tetsuya). He is Rino's real older brother who died when he was a little kid. His spirit resides in that puppet ever since Rino's mother was still alive and probably can move because of the power she put in the doll. However, Rino is also not aware of this fact. He can only talk when somebody's hand is put inside his puppet body, that includes anybody even Rino.
Kanade Jinguuji (神宮司奏, Jingūji Kanade)
Voiced by: Hitomi Nabatame (Japanese); Kelly Manison (English)
Kanade is the executive director and founder of Miyagami Private Academy, president of the Best Student Council, and the future successor of the Jinguuji conglomerate. She takes a special interest in Rino and takes care of her, later found to be at the request of Rino's mother, a relative of hers. She is able to telepathically communicate with other people. Also of note is that Kanade is later revealed to be Mr. Poppit, Rino's penpal at the beginning of the series. When Kanade was just a kid, she had a wish to go to school and so Miyagami Private Academy was built. Eventually, she found her place where she belongs to and gains close friends in this school among the Best Student Council members. All students like her and admire her, especially all Best student Council members who care a lot about her and are very loyal and dedicated to her.
After her graduation from high school, Kanade returns in the last episode as the director of the school.
Nanaho Kinjo (金城奈々穂, Kinjō Nanaho)
Voiced by: Junko Noda (Japanese); Shelley Calene-Black (English)
Nanaho is one of the two vice presidents of the Best Student Council and also the leader of the Assault Squad, using a yo-yo as her weapon. She is very afraid of lightning as she flinches horribly when it strikes and cries out, causing people to look at her strangely. She secretly has a great love for "girly" things like stuffed animals, which can be seen from the decor of her room. This provides a stark contrast to her tomboyish outer appearance and behavior. She was first skeptical by the idea that Pucchan was magical, but later learns that he can talk on her own hand. Nanaho is also an old friend of Kanade and protects and advises Kanade in various matters by her own free will, and not because of the obligations that have been bestowed to the Kinjo family to protect Jinguuji family from generations ago. She has 6 brothers and she is the youngest child of her family. Since childhood she was trained to protect Kanade, which caused her to bear a grudge towards the other girl until Kanade freed her from her forced duties as a guardian. After she was free, she was concerned of Kanade who at that time did not have a will to live which was just like her before she was freed. Then, Nanaho vowed to be by Kanade's side to make Kanade free as a gratitude of giving her freedom and she became Kanade's very closest, long time best friend, and most faithful friend ever since.
Kuon Ginga (銀河久遠, Ginga Kuon)
Voiced by: Kaori Shimizu (Japanese); Luci Christian (English)
Kuon is the second vice president of the best student council and is the top ranking member of the Covert Squad. During the Kuon-centered episodes (15 and 16), it is revealed that she is actually a spy for another organization, on a mission to discover the hidden powers of the Jinguuji family. However, this duty was forced on her as the company her father ran was supported by the organization. She is torn between her family's business and the Best Student Council, not wanting to leave her family or the Best Student Council. During the end of episode fifteen, Kanade refuses to give up her secret to Kuon forcing her (to Kuon's pleasure) to stay at Miyagami Academy. She is a specialist in gathering information, surprising Nanaho during her transfer interview to Miyagami Private Academy. Kuon is also well-trained in self-defense, as can be seen when she performs throws on grown men much larger than herself during the series. Kuon is also one quarter non-Japanese (unspecified from Konami's website) coming from her paternal grandfather's side, and she also comes from a wealthy family.
Mayura Ichikawa (市川まゆら, Ichikawa Mayura)
Voiced by: Miyuki Sawashiro (Japanese); Brittney Karbowski (English)
Mayura is the overstressed accountant for the Best Student Council. She is usually always busy trying to fit in all the needs of the council into the budget, and has appeared in almost every episode working with an abacus. She is always pleading with the rest of the Executive members not to ignore her about the needs of the budget, but is not successful in getting them to listen until one episode centered on her. In short the rest of the Best Student Council (excluding President Kanade) had forced a break up between Mayura and a boyfriend. This was justified since the man was known to date many girls at the same time. They then realized she did it for her friend to see if he was a nice guy. But in order to keep Mayura happy, they all began doing nice things for her, the best thing being that making sure the budget was secure for the next month.

=== Assault Squad ===
The Assault Squad (遊撃部, Yūgekibu) is in charge of the safety and well-being of the school by eliminating any potential threats. The assault squad gain their knowledge of threats from the covert squad.

Sayuri Hida (飛田小百合, Hida Sayuri)
Voiced by: Ayako Kawasumi (Japanese); Nancy Novotny (English)
Sayuri fights with her wooden sword using the Hida Kasseiryuu and is also the number one member of the assault squad. She is an old friend of Rein. Before she was invited to Miyagami Private Academy, she was referred to as a genius swordsman who inherited the pure blood of Hida. An incident that caused her to leave a senior swordsman permanently injured caused her to feel deep guilt ever since, and she sends him flowers daily. When Sayuri's glasses are taken off, she has a hard time seeing, and ends up muttering "my glasses, my glasses" without ever being able to locate them. Sayuri is noted as having a particularly ample bust, something that her best friend Rein is often envious of.
Rein Tsunomoto (角元れいん, Tsunomoto Rein)
Voiced by: Yuki Matsuoka (Japanese); Serena Varghese (English)
Rein uses playing cards as her weapon of choice and is a childhood friend of Sayuri. The Hida family took her in after her father disappeared (most likely due to his gambling debts). She enjoys playing card games and does not mind gambling. Rein also has a love of words, and many times she is heard speaking a sentence using one word and splitting it three ways though they all mean the same thing, such as when she called Sayuri "an idiot, a moron, and a complete dingdong". Rein has an extremely maternal side that is shown when a baby is abandoned at their dorms. This is said to be because her father abandoned her when she was very young, making her understand well how it feels to not be loved by anyone. Sometimes Pucchan refers her as little kid senpai due to her childish acts and nature. Rein also cheats quite a lot because she hates losing making her yearn for her father. Though she has expressed a dislike for her father, claiming she would beat him up if he ever showed up, but deep down she actually still loves him deep in her heart.
Kaori Izumi (和泉香, Izumi Kaori)
Voiced by: Chiwa Saitō (Japanese); Hilary Haag (English)
Kaori fights bare-handed and is a classmate of Rino and Ayumu. She has two brothers and one sister, which is why she does not live in the Gokujou-ryou like the other members of the student council. She has been seen out on the streets early in the morning walking to the school, while the rest of them are already in the dining room eating breakfast, indicating that she doesn't live in the dorm rooms with the rest of the Best Student Council. This is only clearly made known to the rest when a series of events cause them to stumble upon her house and see Kaori's siblings. In episode three, she admits she has a secret crush on Kanade Jinguuji and is jealous of Rino.

=== Covert Squad ===
The Covert Squad (隠密, Onmitsu) specializes in gathering intelligence and performs espionage and surveillance operations. For example, when a new student plans to transfer to Miyagami Private Academy a background check is conducted by the Covert Squad. In the opening title sequence Kuon Ginga and Seina Katsura are originally accompanied by two shadows representing secret members of the Covert Squad. Later these shadows are revealed to be Kotoha Kutsugi to the right (starting in episode 16), and Ayumu Oume to the left (starting in episode 21).

Seina Katsura (桂聖奈, Katsura Seina)
Voiced by: Kumi Sakuma (Japanese); Sasha Paysinger (English)
Seina is the captain of the Covert Squad and Minamo's elder sister. Constantly seen smiling, she can also be very serious when necessary. Seina is first known simply as an old friend of Kanade, but is revealed later in the series to be a relative of hers. While Seina is of Jinguuji blood, she did not inherit the Jinguuji powers, and as a result, had to have her last name changed. Near the end of the series, she is revealed to be the new chairman of V, a group that oversees the workings of the Jinguuji family and controls even the family's leader (which was the main reason that Kanade had trouble rebelling against the family). This position was taken by Seina in an effort to help Kanade. Kuon states at the end of the series that Seina might be the real mysterious one among Best Student Council members. There is no measurement what she is capable of doing and has infinite ways to reach her goals.
Kotoha Kutsugi (矩継琴葉, Kutsugi Kotoha)
Voiced by: Kana Ueda (Japanese); Jessica Boone (English)
Kotoha is the best member of the Covert Squad and uses shurikens as her weapon of choice. She views Kuon with great suspicion and as a threat when her true identity is revealed. Later she comes to accept her as the leader of the covert squad once seeing all the hard choices Kuon has had to make throughout her life. She is said to never smile, but towards the end of episode sixteen she finally smiles at Kuon. Kotoha is also a master of unarmed combat and disguise, posing as the caretaker of Gotojoju-ryou in episode 11 during a futsal match between the Best Student Council and the Kenran student council. The game was later won almost single-handedly by her, despite the other team possessing a huge lead in the first half of the match.
Ayumu Ohme (桜梅歩, Ōme Ayumu)
Voiced by: Eri Sendai (Japanese); Monica Rial (English)
Ayumu is Rino's best friend, classmate and the one to introduce her to the Best Student Council. She is later found to be from the Oume clan of ninja, who left them because she disliked the rules and policies that prohibited her from acting or dressing how most girls would. She has a twin brother named Urato. In the episode centered around her, Ayumu is discovered by a talent scout and planned to enter showbiz as AYU-AYU, but bails after figuring out she would have to wear a ninja outfit. In this same episode, it is also revealed that she is a member of the Covert squad as well.
Minamo Katsura (桂みなも, Katsura Minamo)
Voiced by: Ayumi Tsuji (Japanese); Kim-Ly Nguyen (English)
Minamo is Seina's little sister and also inherited no powers from the Jinguji blood within her. She has a very rare heart condition making her very physically weak, though this is hidden by her constantly playing pranks and general acts of mischief (this has included making a mess of the school dorms and throwing Nanaho's European-imported teddy bear into pouring rain). She likes writing scripts and drawings. She was the one behind projects such as the Best Student Council card game featuring the members of the student council and the (poorly received) play "The Alien Space Creature from Outer Space". Even though Minamo has a weak heart, she doesn't want others to pity her, causing her to constantly push herself despite her uncurable condition.
Maachi Hisakawa (久川まあち, Hisakawa Maachi)
Voiced by: Kimiko Koyama (Japanese); Ann McPeters (English)
Maachi Hisakawa is the Best Student Council accommodation 'Landlord' and overseer. Being only in the fifth grade, she does not attend Miyagami Private Academy classes. She is only of 11 years of age. Her duties at the Miyagami Private Academy are to cook, clean, and do such things a landlord would do. Maachi Hisakawa is proud of what she does, as its fun and enjoyable to do what she does. In the show, she is almost always seen with a smile on her face and says little more than her trademark giggle, "tee-heh". Being that way, she is liked and cared for by the rest of the council. In episode 23, "Extraordinary Girl Detective Team", Rino and Pucchan lead a team of girl detectives in search of why Maachi is seen skipping school on somedays. After a long day, they find out why. In episode 11, "Winning Five", the entire futsal club at Miyagami Academy gets sick and the Best Student Council, provoked by rival Kenran Student Council, participate in their place. The Kenran Student Council's dirty tactics get the best of the Best Student Council until Maachi volunteers herself to play. After single handedly turning the match around to win, it is revealed that it was actually Kotoha Kutsugi disguised as Maachi.

=== Vehicle Squad ===
Cyndi Manabe (シンディ真鍋, Shindi Manabe)
Voiced by: Tomoko Kawakami (Japanese); Ann McPeters (English)
Cyndi is the only shown member of the Vehicle Squad and speaks in a combination of English and Japanese, though her lines have usually been short, such as "me too" and "roger". She addresses Kanade as "Boss". She is in love with Pucchan, and later confesses this to him (Pucchan never turned her down). Everyone else, however, does point out that "He's a puppet!" Cyndi is later found to be, in fact, quite adept and aware of the situation around her. In episode 25, Cyndi can speak Japanese (English in the dubbed version) fluently but it is later revealed that she never spoke it properly because her mother (who speaks in a highly rude manner much like gangsters picking a fight) told her she was not speaking it right.

== Production ==
The anime television series featured three pieces of theme music. The opening theme is "Koi se yo Onna no ko" (恋せよ女の子) performed by Yukari Tamura. The first ending theme for the first thirteen episodes is "Guuzen Tenshi" (偶然天使) performed by Gokujou Seitokai Shikkoubu. The second ending theme is "Koi suru miracle" (恋する奇跡) performed by Gokujou Seitokai Yuugeki and Sharyoubu for the last thirteen episodes.

== Soundtracks ==
=== Gokujo Drama & Gokujo Soundtrack Vol. 1 ===
1. Avant Title
2. Koi se yo Onna no Ko (TV size)
3. Gokujo Drama 'Gokujo Shuugakuryokou' Prologue ~Kaigi nite~
4. Haikei, Mister Puppet
5. Tsutaetai Koto
6. Aru asa no Hitokoma
7. Namida mo Kanashimi mo
8. Sono Yasashisa wo Mune ni
9. Gokujo Drama 'Gokujo Shuugakuryokou' Episode 1 ~Mottomo Kouka na Survival~
10. Chotto Matte!
11. Trouble Holiday
12. Shinkoku na Jitai
13. Rino to Pucchan
14. Gokujo Drama 'Gokujo Shuugakuryokou' Episode 2 ~Itsuka Bijou to Yajuu to Ouji-sama ga~
15. Kyokudai Kengen Hoyuu Saijoukyuu Seitokai
16. Guuzen to Hitsuzen
17. Mission -Activation-
18. Mission -Strain tail-
19. Chase and Fight!
20. Moshimo Anata ni Aeta nara
21. Gokujo Drama 'Gokujo Shuugakuryokou' Episode 3 ~Shika Senbei ni Ki wo Tsukero!~
22. Guuzen Tenshi (TV size)
23. Gokujo Drama 'Gokujo Shuugakuryokou' Epilogue ~Shuugakuryoku no Omoide~
24. Ichikawa Mayura Image Song 'ONLY PLACE'

=== Gokujo Drama & Gokujo Soundtrack Vol. 2 ===
1. Avant Title
2. Gokujo Drama 'Gokujo Arbeit' Prologue ~Kinkyuujidai~
3. Shutsudou! -Gokujo Seitokai no Theme-
4. Kokage no Shita de
5. Uwasa Hanashi wa O-suki?
6. Sono Mune no Oku no Jijitsu
7. Nodoka na Hirusagari
8. Gokujo Drama 'Gokujo Arbeit' Episode 1 ~Sousama no Restaurant~
9. Oshaberi no Yukue
10. Ano Oka made Ikou
11. Todokanai Tooi Yume
12. Sorya nain janai!?
13. Itoshisa mo Yasashisa
14. Gokujo Drama 'Gokujo Arbeit' Episode 2 ~Wakana to Shitagi to Yasashii Yatsura~
15. Secret Maneuvers
16. A Tense Atmosphere
17. Be Active
18. Crisis!!
19. Sore wa Suteki na Ketsumatsu
20. Komorebi no Mukou ni
21. Happy, Love, and Delicious!!
22. Gokujo Drama 'Gokujo Arbeit' Episode 3 ~Rino yori, Ai wo Komete~
23. Koi Suru Miracle (TV Size)
24. Gokujo Drama 'Gokujo Arbeit' Epilogue ~Yosan no Yukue~
25. Izumi Kaori Image Song Precious Moment

== Reception ==
Theron Martin of Anime News Network said the series recycles "bad clichés" but has its "clever moments". He adds that the series has some other "good gags" and calls the artistry "bright, cheery, and appealing" while calling the background art "uneven", and says the musical score is a nice complement to the series. He ends by saying that Negima is better than this series and calls the series with recycled humor, but "funny and entertaining moments" to carry the anime as a whole.

Erica Friedman reviewed the anime on two occasions. In her first review she called the anime a "lot of fun" and it has at least "a little meat for the yuri fan to chew on", and said that Izumi Kaori is the only "real" lesbian in the group of characters, with undertones among everyone else. In her second review, she called it the series the "perfect way to unwind" and called the series "entertaining, not taxing, with surprising moments of hysterical".
