= Paboo & Mojies =

Korean-Japanese television series

パブー&モジーズ (Pabū & mojīzu)
- Genre: Preschool, Slice of Life
- Created by: Sega Toys; Daewon Media
- Anime television series
- Directed by: Hiroshi Negishi (Chief); Tae-Heo Han
- Produced by: Hideyuki Takai; Bul-Kyung Kim
- Written by: Mayori Sekijima
- Music by: Shiki Yoshizumi; Kazuya Nishioka; Snowmobiles
- Studio: We've; Dong Woo Animation; ZERO-G (Cooperation)
- Licensed by: Nelvana
- Original network: BS Fuji (Japan); KBS1 (Korea)
- Original run: April 2, 2012 – March 30, 2013
- Episodes: 52

Paboo & Mojies (Korean: 빠뿌야 놀자; RR: Ppappuya nolja, Katakana: パブー&モジーズ, Pabū & mojīzu) is a 2012 South Korean-Japanese anime series produced by We've and Dong Woo Animation, based on the toys and franchise of the same name created by Daewon Media of South Korea and Sega Toys of Japan. It is directed by Hiroshi Negishi (Saber Marionette R, NG Knight Lamune & 40) produced by Hideyuki Takai (The Cat Returns) and written by Mayori Sekijima (Clamp School Detectives). It premiered on KBS1 in Korea from May 5, 2012, to May 18, 2013, with a total of 52 episodes.

The series is primarily aimed on preschoolers to teach basic English words and letters, with the entire series themed around the English alphabet. Nelvana licensed the series worldwide.

== Story ==
Paboo is a young yet curious panda boy who lives in a magical land called Mojies Town. One day, he found a magical book up the Moji Tree and decides to get it. After he got the book, a magical fairy named Pappy popped out and told him about the book he found: The Mojires Book and also about the Magic Words that would help him and his friends in any situation. Now, Paboo and his friends all explore and solve problems in a quirky, imaginative, and sometimes zany world and discover each Magic Word with the help from Pappy. A pig named Peter along with his sister also want to get their hands on the Mojies book and try many attempts to steal the book from Paboo, only to be outsmarted by Paboo.

== Characters ==
=== Main characters ===
Paboo (パブー, Pabū)
Voiced by: Mika Itō
The series's main protagonist, Paboo is a curious fun-loving panda who loves adventures, imagination and exploring with his friends. He often keeps the Mojies book in his pocket and summons Puppy when there is a problem to call out the magic word. He is represented by the letter P and is based on a Giant Panda.
Puppy (パピー, Papī)
Voiced by: Kana Matsumiya
The fairy who lives inside the Mojies book. He usually comes out whenever Paboo pulls out the book out of his pocket and uses the ability to call the magic word whenever there is a problem. He has no recollection on where he originally came from until it is revealed to once lived with the Goddess back at Fairy World.
Rosie (ロージー, Rōjī)
Voiced by: Maika Takai
Paboo's closest friend, a rabbit who wears a rainbow-colored ribbon on her head (originally wore a pink ribbon in the first episode). Rosie loves flowers, but can be a little short-tempered sometimes. She also has a cousin named Rose. She is represented by the letter R and is based on a European Rabbit.
David (デビッド, Debiddo)
Voiced by: Hitomi Yamano
Also one of Paboo's closest friends, a dog who wears a blue hoodie with a doughnut on it. He is represented by the letter D and is based on a German Shepherd.
Emma (エマ, Ema)
Voiced by: Ayumi Tsuji
Rosie's best friend, an elephant who often has an egg shell (inspired by an egg of Yoshi) on her head. She is represented by the letter E and is based on an African Bush Elephant (the mistake is the absence of her tusks).
Zorro (ゾロ, Zoro)
Voiced by: Michael Shitanda
A zebra who is another of Paboo's best friends. He often wields a carrot like a sword (even though he eats it sometimes), and his favorite food is carrots, and Hanna has a crush on him. He is represented by the letter Z and is based on a Grevy's Zebra.
Peter (ピーター, Pītā)
Voiced by: Michiru Satou
The series's main antagonist, a greedy and wealthy pig who lives in a mansion with his sister, and has a butler named Sebastian. Peter tries many attempts to steal the Mojies book from Paboo. Sometimes Peter bullies Paboo and his friends or join Paboo and his friends to help him with his problems. In one episode, Peter at last got the opportunity to steal the Mojies book from Paboo and force Puppy to use every magic word, but Paboo fought him got the book back from him and reunites with Puppy and is based on an American Yorkshire Pig.
Peggy (ペギー, Pegī)
Voiced by: Hina Murakami
Peter's sister, who helps him attempt to get the Mojies book, she is also based on an American Yorkshire Pig.

=== Supporting characters ===
- Alice: An alligator who is a classmate in Mojiesgarten. Her favorite food eat apples. Alice often cries when she has problems and is based on an American Alligator.
- Bobby: A bear who is a classmate in Mojiesgarten and is based on a Grizzly Bear.
- Chris: A camel who owns a cap and hat shop. He also acts like a detective when something goes awry and is based on a Dromedary Camel.
- Frank: A flamingo who is a classmate in Mojiesgarten and is based on an Caribbean Flamingo.
- George: A giraffe who loves to play guitar. He also owns a book shop and is based on a Reticulated Giraffe.
- Hanna: A hippo who is a classmate in Mojiesgarten. She even has a crush on Zorro. Hanna is also good friends of Rosie and Emma and is based on a River Hippopotamus.
- Ian: An iguana who owns an ice cream truck and sells ice cream and is based on a Green Iguana.
- Jessie: A jaguar who owns a jacket shop. She also loves juice. is based on a Jaguar.
- Kerry: A kangaroo who is a classmate in Mojiesgarten. She is even a closest friend of Paboo and is based on a Red Kangaroo.
- Leo: A lion who is a classmate in Mojiesgarten. He is also good friends of Paboo, David, and Zorro and is based on an African Lion.
- M.C.: A mouse who live in a laboratory and is an inventor and often wears a head-like tube and is based on a House Mouse.
- Nancy: A Nessie who lives in the waters of Mojies Town and is based on a Plesiosaurus.
- Oliver: An orangutan who owns a toy shop and is based on a Bornean Orangutan.
- Quincy: A quail who loves flowers and owns a flower shop, just like Rosie. She even claims to be a queen, and has an assistant named Smith and is based on a California Quail.
- Steve: A snake who wears sunglasses and owns a sweets shop and is based on a Garter Snake.
- Tommy: A tiger who is an adventurer. Leo is also a fan of him and is based on a Bengal Tiger.
- Uno: A unicorn who owns an umbrella shop and is based on a Rainbow Unicorn.
- Venus: A vulture who is a classmate in Mojiesgarten. Her favorite instrument is the violin and is based on a Black Vulture.
- Walter: A whale who lives in the waters of Mojies Town. In one episode, he even rode on the Moji Train with Paboo and friends and is based on a Sperm Whale.
- Xeno: A fox who owns an instrument shop. His favorite instrument is the xylophone and is based on a Red Fox.
- York: A yak who lives on a farm of vegetables and is based on a Domestic Yak.

=== Minor characters ===
- The Numbugs: Ten insects who live in Mojies Town. They attack Peter and Peggy for disturbing them as a running gag. They all appear in another episode where Emma and her friends play a game of finding them.
- Pat: Paboo's mother. She is often kind and loves to make pancakes.
- Paul: Paboo's father. Also the mail-carrier.
- Cutie: A cat who is the Mojiesgarten teacher. She is very kind and often wears a smile on her face.
- Sebastian: Peter and Peggy's butler.
- Smith: Quincy's assistant. He gets a little strict with her sometimes.
- Moji Tree: A talking tree of Mojies Town.
- Moji Train: A talking train that takes Paboo and his friends anywhere.
- Kate: Kerry's mother.
- Ellen: Emma's older sister. She, Emma and her friends play a game of finding the Numbugs in one episode.
- Eddie: Emma's father and the doctor of the Mojies hospital.
- Rachel: Rosie's mother.
- Rose: Rosie's cousin. She also loves getting into mischief.
- Hiehie: A robot created by M.C. that David befriends.
- Goddess: A beautiful fairy who lives in fairy world and originally owned the book of Mojies.

== Media ==
=== Anime ===
The series began airing on BS Fuji in Japan from April 2, 2012, to March 30, 2013, and on KBS1 in Korea from May 5, 2012, to May 18, 2013, with a total of 52 11 minute episodes. The Japanese version is accompanied by a live educational interstitial titled Mojires & YOU (モジーズ&YOU, Mojīzu & yū). All the episodes of the series were uploaded to the anime's official YouTube account a few days after the series finished its airing in Korea.

=== Crossover Comic book ===
The series South Korea–Philippines crossover legendary comic book published by Haksan Publishing, CJ ENM, Frontier Works Comics worldwide franchise superheroes Korean Version accompanied by a live-action in year 2019.

=== Music ===
The series's is both composed by Shīki Yoshizumi and Kazuya Nishioka with cooperation from Snowmobile's. The opening song is titled "DA・BI・DA・GO!" by Shoko Haida and the ending song is titled Mojimojimo~jimoji (モジモジモ〜ジモジ) by mao.

=== Toys ===
Considered as the first collaborative effort between Daewon Media and Sega Sammy Holdings, several toys and educational teaching tools were released during the series's airing. Some of the toys were also released by Takara Tomy.
