= Atsushi Suzumi =

Japanese manga artist

Atsushi Suzumi 鈴見 敦
- Born: Ehime Prefecture, Japan
- Area: Manga artist
- Notable works: Venus Versus Virus

Atsushi Suzumi (鈴見 敦, Suzumi Atsushi; born in Ehime Prefecture) is a Japanese manga artist. She has been drawing manga since kindergarten and cites Akira Toriyama and Mutsumi Inomata as influences. In 2005, she released Haridama Magical Cram School, and in 2007, she released Amefurashi: The Rain Goddess. Her manga Venus Versus Virus was adapted into an anime television series in 2007.

== Works ==
Name	Year	Notes	Refs
Haridama Magic Cram School	2005	Published by Sirius KC for 1 volume	
Amefurashi	2007	Published under Sirius KC for 2 volumes	
Venus Versus Virus	2005–08	Serialized in Dengeki Comic Gao! and Dengeki Daioh; Published by Dengeki Comics for 8 volumes.	
Nightmare Go Round	2009	Published by Young Gangan comics for 2 volumes	
Uruwashi Kaito Arisu (うるわし怪盗アリス, Beautiful Phantom Thief Alice)	2010	Published by Dengeki Comics for 2 volumes	
Tokyo Ravens	2010–17	Manga adaptation of light novel Serialized in Shōnen Ace; Published by Kadodawa Comics Ace for 15 volumes.	
Record of Lodoss War: The Crown of the Covenant	2019–2021	Manga adaptation of light novel Serialized in Monthly Shōnen Ace. Published by Kadodawa Shoten for 3 volumes.	
