= Dong Woo Animation =

South Korean animation studio

Dong Woo Animation 동우에이엔이
- Industry: Animation
- Founded: November 1991; 34 years ago
- Headquarters: Seoul, South Korea
- Area served: South Korea; United States; Canada; Japan
- Key people: Kim Young-doo (CEO)
- Parent: Studio Gallop

DongWoo Animation Co. Ltd, also known as DongWoo A&E Co. Ltd (Korean: 동우에이엔이), is an animation studio located in Seoul, South Korea. It has produced many animated series and films created and produced in the United States, Canada, Japan and South Korea. The current CEO of the studio is Kim Young-doo.

== History ==
The company was established in 1991 as DongWoo Donghwa (동우동화).

In 1994, it had become first priority work-for-hire studio for Studio Gallop.

In 1998, it began to work directly with Sony Columbia TriStar (USA) and since 2002 has been a main source of overseas animation production for Warner Bros. Animation.

In April 1999, the company was renamed to DongWoo Animation Corporation (Dongwoo A&E Corporation) (동우애니메이션 & 엔터테인먼트).

BASToF Lemon, the company's first original animated series, began its broadcast in 2001.

In January 2002, Dongwoo opened its Los Angeles Office.

In April 2004, Dongwoo opened its Gangwon office.

In April 2012, DongWoo Animation & Entertainment was renamed to Dongwoo A&E Co., Ltd (동우에이앤이㈜).

== Animation ==
=== Original series ===
- A Fairy Tale Christmas (2005)
- Africa a.F.r.I.c.A
- Animated Classic Fairy Tales (2003)
- BASToF Lemon (2001)
- Bee and PuppyCat (2014)
- Bristol Expedition (2008)
- Daobazzi, The Animation (2007)
- Dokdo (2007)
- Dooly the Little Dinosaur (2009)
- Gotya!
- Jubles
- KARA The Animation
- Kommi (2004)
- Magi-Nation (2007–2010)
- MANI's adventure (2011)
- Mateo
- Mudaeri (2007)
- My Friend Haechi (2010)
- Naughty Keratops Coryillo
- Power King Match-Up Keeper
- Sinarak (2005)
- Uniminipet (2001)
- Vary Peri (2012–2013)

=== Co-productions ===
- Animal Yokochō
- Bristol Expedition (2008)
- Chaotic (2006) (Season 2–3)
- Dooly the Little Dinosaur (2013)
- Je Suis to be Kidding me (2019)
- KARA the Animation (2012)
- Magi-Nation (2009)
- Mainichi Kaasan (2011)
- Origami Warriors (2006)
- Olympus Guardian (TV series; 2002)
- Paboo & Mojies (2012)
- Pretty Rhythm: Aurora Dream/PrismStone (2013)
- PriPara (2014–2017)
- Racing Force (2015–2018)
- Racing Force The Beginning (2018–2019)
- Scan2Go (2010)
- Soul Knights (2017–2018)
- Tama and Friends: Search for it! The Magic Puni-Puni Stone (2006)
- Tank Knights Fortress (2006)
- Teenage Mutant Ninja Turtles (2003)
- What About Mimi? (2002)
- Yvon of the Yukon (2002)
- Zoobles! (2012)

=== Foreign productions ===
- A Little Dinosour Doolie (2009)
- Aloha, Scooby-Doo! (2005)
- Akazukin Chacha (1994–1995)
- Avengers Assemble (2013)
- Baby Looney Tunes (2002–2004)
- Batman: Gotham Knight (Deadshot segment; co-produced with Madhouse)
- Batman: The Brave and the Bold (2008)
- Bee and PuppyCat (2014)
- Ben 10 (2005–2008)
- Ben 10: Alien Force (2008–2010)
- Ben 10: Ultimate Alien (2010–2012)
- Ben 10: Omniverse (2012–2014)
- Big Guy and Rusty the Boy Robot (1999–2001)
- Black Dynamite (2012)
- Blood of Zeus (2020) (alongside Powerhouse Animation Studios)
- Bravest Warriors (2012–2017)
- ChaeChaepong Kimchipong (2003)
- Chaotic (2009)
- Dante's Inferno: An Animated Epic (2010)
- Daobazzi, The Animation (2008)
- Dawn of the Croods (2015)
- Dragon Tales (1999)
- Eyeshield 21 (2005–2008)
- Forza! Hidemaru (2002)
- Gearheadz (2007)
- Generator Rex (2010)
- Genji Tsūshin Agedama (1991–1992)
- Geronimo Stilton (2009–2017)
- Godzilla: The Series (1998)
- Guardians of the Galaxy (2015–2019)
- He-Man and the Masters of the Universe (2002–2004)
- Hime-chan's Ribbon (1992–1993)
- Hulk and the Agents of S.M.A.S.H. (2013–2015)
- Initial D: First Stage (1998)
- Jackie Chan Adventures (2000–2005)
- Justice League (2001–2004)
- Justice League Unlimited (2004–2006)
- Justice League: The New Frontier (2008)
- Kiteretsu Daihyakka (1994–1996)
- Kochira Katsushika-ku Kameari Kōen-mae Hashutsujo (1996–1999)
- Kodomo no Omocha (1996)
- Krypto the Superdog (2005)
- Khuda Yana (2012)
- La Corda d'Oro: Primo Passo (2007)
- Legion of Super Heroes (2006)
- Legendz (2004)
- Loonatics Unleashed (alongside DR Movie)
- Magi-Nation (2008–2009)
- Men in Black: The Series (1997)
- Nurse Angel Ririka SOS (1995–1996)
- Olympus Guardian (2002–2003)
- Once Upon a Time in Silver Showers Kkabi? (1991)
- Oggy and the Cockroaches (2012–2013)
- Ozzy & Drix (2002–2004)
- Pretty Rhythm: Aurora Dream (2013)
- Pretty Rhythm: Dear My Future (2012–2013)
- Pretty Rhythm: Rainbow Live (2013–2014)
- PriPara (2014–2017)
- Rahan: Son of the Dark Age (2008)
- Rurouni Kenshin (1996)
- Shaggy & Scooby-Doo Get a Clue! (2006-2008)
- Scooby-Doo! and the Goblin King (2008)
- Scooby-Doo! and the Loch Ness Monster (2004)
- Scooby-Doo! Mystery Incorporated (2010)
- Scooby-Doo! Pirates Ahoy! (2006)
- Scooby-Doo! in Where's My Mummy? (2005)
- Static Shock (2002)
- Superman: Doomsday (2007)
- Tama and Friends: Search for It! The Magic Puni-Puni Stone (2006)
- Teen Titans (2003–2006)
- Teen Titans: Trouble in Tokyo (2006)
- Teenage Mutant Ninja Turtles (2003–2010)
- The Avengers: Earth's Mightiest Heroes (2010–2012)
- The Batman (2004–2008)
- The Batman vs. Dracula (2005)
- The Cat&Birdy Warneroonie PinkyBrainy Big Cartoonie Show (1999–2000)
- The Boondocks (2007)
- The Daltons (2010)
- The Haunted House (Season 2 & 4)
- The Legend of Prince Valiant (1991–1993)
- The Spectacular Spider-Man (2008–2009)
- The Super Hero Squad Show (2011)
- The Zeta Project (2001)
- Transformers: Robots in Disguise (2000)
- Turbo Fast (2013–2016)
- Turtles Forever (2009)
- Ultimate Avengers (2006)
- Ultimate Avengers 2 (2006)
- Ultimate Spider-Man (2012)
- Underworld: Endless War (2011)
- What's New, Scooby-Doo? (2002–2006)
- W.I.T.C.H. (2006)
- Yu-Gi-Oh! 5D's (2008–2009)
- Yu-Gi-Oh! Capsule Monsters (2006)
- Yu-Gi-Oh! Duel Monsters (2003–2004)
- Yu-Gi-Oh! GX (2005–2008)
- Yu-Gi-Oh! The Movie: Pyramid of Light (2004)
- Zig & Sharko (2010–2012)

== See also ==
- Rough Draft Korea
