= ChaeChaepong Kimchipong =

- Country of origin: South Korea
- Original language: Korean
- No. of seasons: 1
- No. of episodes: 26

Production
- Running time: 30 minutes
- Production companies: Juju Bank; Korean Broadcasting System; Seoul Movie; Dongwoo A&E; Coco Enterprises

Original release
- Network: KBS2
- Release: August 9, 2002 – February 28, 2003

ChaeChaepong Kimchipong (Korean: 채채퐁 김치퐁) is a 2002 South Korean animated series co-produced by KBS and Coco Enterprises. The series followed a premise similar to franchises such as Pokémon and Digimon, where a group of kids captured small monsters.

== Plot ==
A thousand years before the story is set, wizardess Harin created the ChaeChaepong creatures to battle Aegross, who wanted to destroy the environment. A thousand years later, Tochi, a young boy, escaped Aegross' powers which literally petrified his village. In order to destroy Aegross' rule, he has to collect ChaeChaepongs around the world, recovering the health of the places he goes to.

Each of the ChaeChaepongs is based on ingredients used to make kimchi, as well as featuring other core elements of Korean traditional culture, such as onggi and the taegeuk patterns, in its backgrounds. Each ChaeChaepong has an element (water, wind, earth, fire, light); when the five are combined, these form Harin's sword, which defeats Aegross

== Production and broadcast ==
The series started airing on KBS2 on August 9, 2002, and aimed at increasing the consumption of kimchi among Korean children, as well as promoting a healthy lifestyle. The production team believed that kimchi consumption would increase the same was as the Popeye cartoons did with spinach decades before.

The series was the result of a collaborative effort between Juju Bank, a minor animation studio (being its first work), and the Korean Broadcasting System. The idea came from a September 2000 dinner involving company founder Kim Young-jun, where someone compared the preparation of kimchi to wine from fermented grapes and cheese from fermented milk. Moreover, vegetarianism was on the rise in South Korea, and, coupled with the then-impending arrival of the 2002 FIFA World Cup (which South Korea co-hosted with Japan), came the idea of an animated series featuring uniquely Korean cultural elements to attract children in Korea and abroad. After working for forty days, KBS approved the concept and began co-production talks with foreign broadcasters; the first of which being NHK, Fuji TV and TV Asahi. The name ChaeChaepong is based on the Korean phrase Chaesoran chaesoneun mojori pongdang (채소란 채소는 모조리 퐁당, "Vegetables are like fondant") and Kimchipong is based on the monster trend of the time, likening it to Vegimon. The five ChaeChaepongs were based on animal parts used to make kimchi. Juju Bank's team of nine worked well into early 2002; recording was done at Coco Enterprises and animation was made at Dong Woo Animation. Seoul Movie also did character work.

Before release, Kim Il-rim of Cine21 noted that there was a lack of originality, comparing it to Japanese monster anime.

The English dub of the series was put up for syndication in the United States; the distributor was Promark Television.
