= Venus Versus Virus =

Japanese manga series & its franchise

- Lucia on the cover of Venus Versus Virus manga volume 1

ヴィーナス ヴァーサス ヴァイアラス (Vīnasu Vāsasu Vaiarasu)
- Genre: Dark fantasy; Girls with guns; Supernatural thriller
- Manga
- Written by: Atsushi Suzumi
- Published by: ASCII Media Works
- English publisher: NA: Seven Seas Entertainment
- Magazine: Dengeki Comic Gao! (former); Dengeki Daioh
- Original run: June 27, 2005 – July 26, 2008
- Volumes: 8
- Anime television series
- Directed by: Shinichiro Kimura
- Produced by: Rie Tanabe; Kozue Kananiwa; Katsumi Koike; Shin'ichi Nakamura; Koichi Saito
- Written by: Yasunori Yamada
- Music by: Hikaru Nanase
- Studio: Studio Hibari
- Licensed by: NA: Crunchyroll; UK: MVM Entertainment
- Original network: TBS
- English network: NA: Anime Network, Crunchyroll Channel
- Original run: January 11, 2007 – March 29, 2007
- Episodes: 12
- icon

Venus Versus Virus (ヴィーナス ヴァーサス ヴァイアラス, Vīnasu Vāsasu Vaiarasu) (Note: In volume 1 of the original manga, Venus Versus Virus is sometimes referred to as simply V.V.V., while katakana only appears as furigana, or a pronunciation aid, to the English title.) is a Japanese manga series created by Atsushi Suzumi which was first serialized on June 27, 2005, in MediaWorks' shōnen manga magazine Dengeki Comic Gao!. The manga ended serialization in Dengeki Comic Gao! on February 27, 2008, due to the magazine's discontinuation, but the manga continued serialization in ASCII Media Works' manga magazine Dengeki Daioh between March 21 and July 26, 2008. Eight bound volumes have been released by ASCII Media Works in Japan. The manga has been licensed for English language distribution by North American–based company Seven Seas Entertainment; the first volume was released in July 2007. Later, a drama CD was created based on the manga series in October 2006. The series has since been adapted into an anime produced by Studio Hibari that aired in Japan between January and March 2007 on BS-i, consisting of twelve episodes.

== Plot ==
Venus Versus Virus revolves around the life of two teenage girls named Sumire Takahana and Lucia Nahashi, who met when Sumire discovered Lucia's mysterious secret as a member of the Venus Vanguard, a group led by Lucia's adoptive father Soichiro which hunts demons called "Viruses". Now, while accepting jobs from people who find the Venus Vanguard brochure they fight off the "Viruses", while seeking the demons' true origins and motives as Lucia finds that Sumire is a lot more useful than she seems.

== Characters ==
=== Main characters ===
Sumire Takahana (鷹花 スミレ, Takahana Sumire)
Voiced by: Minori Chihara (Japanese); Natalie Arneson (English), Rina Satō (first drama CD)
Sumire is a student at Shirogane Girls Academy and is the newest member of the Venus Vanguard, despite being terribly scared of Viruses and the fact that she's been able to see ghosts most of her life, even when she was a child. While initially she cannot be of much help to Lucia, they eventually find out that whenever her body reacts to the special chemical used to defeat Viruses (the so-called Vaccine), she transforms into a "Berserker Mode", or a living Anti-Virus. With this strange ability, she becomes stronger and violent, and is capable of defeating Viruses with her bare hands, but when under the influence of this power, she cannot discern friend from foe, although over the course of the series she learns how to control her powers. She has feelings for Yoshiki, a boy she met in the park.
Lucia Nahashi (名橋 ルチア, Nahashi Ruchia)
Voiced by: Ayahi Takagaki (Japanese); Joanne Bonasso (English), Luci Christian (child) Hitomi Nabatame (first drama CD)
Lucia is a strong girl who leads the fights against Viruses alongside the other members of the Venus Vanguard, sworn to fight and kill all Viruses. She is battlehardened and cold, but she shows a lot more facial expressions in the manga than in the anime. Her left eye holds a mysterious power, though is almost always covered with an eye patch. Use of her powers is taxing and wears her out, but can often be disastrous to her enemy in many ways. Her left arm has a symbol of the enchantment succeeded from her father. According to Sumire, Lucia often gives off a faint fragrance of roses, which is a scant memory of their intertwined pasts. She smokes in the manga.
Soichiro Nahashi (名橋 総一郎, Nahashi Sōichirō)
Voiced by: Jūrōta Kosugi (Japanese); John Swasey (English), Tamio Ōki (first drama CD)
Soichiro is the guardian of Lucia, who loves her as if she were his real daughter-(the same goes for Lucia). Before Lucia was born, Soichiro was studying to become a mage, along with Lilith and Lucif, who are Lucia's biological mother and father respectively. He harbored an unrequited love for Lilith, but never got close with her as she was in love with Lucif.
Lola (ローラ, Rōra)
Voiced by: Ayumi Tsuji (Japanese); Kim-Ly Nguyen (English)
A mysterious blonde girl who lives with Lucia and Soichiro. She loves chocolate and is often seen eating it. She has a twin named Layla and in the anime neither of them seem to age since they are soulless dolls created by Lucif and Soichiro's teacher; in the manga they are orphaned girls with a telepathic link to one another. She is a major character right from the beginning in the anime, but in the manga she does not show up until the fourth volume. In the English version of the anime, her name is rendered as "Laura".
Yoshiki Kusanagi (草薙 与識, Kusanagi Yoshiki)
Voiced by: Kiyotaka Furushima (Japanese); Blake Shepard (English)
Yoshiki is a young man Sumire met one day in a park while he was reading a book. After a few more meetings together while exchanging books to read, Yoshiki starts to develop romantic feelings for Sumire. In the anime it is later discovered that he is actually one of Lucif's followers named Aion, he tries to take Sumire's fragment but stops because he truly cared for her, thus, he betrays Lucif, but Lucia, not knowing of his betrayal, kills him. In the manga, Aion is a sorcerer who seems to possess Lucif and later Yoshiki.

=== Supporting characters ===
Nene Mikumo (三雲 音々, Mikumo Nene)
Voiced by: Sakura Nogawa (Japanese); Carli Mosier (English)
Nene is Sumire's female cousin who always tries to look out for her like an older sister. She often encourages her younger brother Riku in his attempts to ask Sumire out on a date.
Riku Mikumo (三雲 理久, Mikumo Riku)
Voiced by: Hiromi Hirata (Japanese); Luci Christian (English)
Riku is Nene's younger brother who has a crush on Sumire. Multiple times, Riku attempts to ask Sumire out on a date, but something always interferes, leaving him heartbroken each time. He has a timid personality, which makes it even more difficult to ask Sumire out.
Mika (ミカ)
Voiced by: Kaya Miyake (Japanese); Pamela Morris (English), Ai Nonaka (first drama CD)
Mika is one of Sumire's good friends and classmates. She has a tomboyish personality.
Kyōko (京子)
Voiced by: Noriko Shitaya (Japanese); Kira Vincent-Davis (English), Emiri Katō (first drama CD)
Kyōko is another one of Sumire's good friends and classmates.
Shizu (しず)
Voiced by: Tomo Adachi (Japanese); Nancy Novotny (English), Kayo Sakata (first drama CD)
Shizu is another one of Sumire's good friends and classmates.
Lilith (リリス, Ririsu)
Voiced by: Wakana Yamazaki (Japanese); Stephanie Wittels (English)
Lilith is Lucia's mother who once worked under a mentor with Lucif and Soichiro to learn magic arts, and in the anime after he died, their training ceased. Lilith fell in love with Lucif and eventually became pregnant with Lucia, though by the time she was born, Lucif was already gone on his quest for the True World. In the anime, a Virus allegedly killed Lilith when Lucia was still two years old. The Virus that killed her was Lucif so he could obtain her special fragment, although in the end, the fragment disappears. She killed herself to protect Lucia and the world that Lucif wanted to destroy.

=== Antagonists ===
Sonoka (苑果)
Voiced by: Fumi Morisawa (Japanese); Christine Auten (English)
Sonoka is the current leader of the Virus, and has a particular focused interest in Lucia and Sumire. She is a devoted follower of Aion (Lucif in the anime) and his quest to find the True World.
Ruka (ルカ, Ruka)
Voiced by: Yui Itsuki (Japanese); Melissa Pritchett (English)
Ruka is a young girl who serves under Sonoka. She has a sadistic personality and has the power to control water and wind, though she states her specialty is electricity. In the English version of the anime, her name is rendered as "Luca".
Guy (ガイ, Gai)
Voiced by: Akio Suyama (Japanese); Josh Grelle (English)
Guy is another one of Sonoka's henchman. He has a similar personality to Ruka, and he has the power to control fire and earth.
Layla (ライラ, Raira)
Voiced by: Ayumi Tsuji (Japanese); Kim-Ly Nguyen (English)
Layla is Lola's twin. In the anime, after Lucif left to find the True World, Layla went with him and Lola stayed with Soichiro and Lilith. In the anime, Layla loves konpeito candy as much as Lola loves chocolate; in the manga, both twins are ardent fans of Pocky-like sticks, and are often seen munching on them. While in the anime, she is rather passive; in the manga, she gives off a more sinister presence.
Lucif (リュシフ, Ryushifu)
Voiced by: Daisuke Namikawa (Japanese); Illich Guardiola (English)
Lucif is Lucia's father who, before she was born, left to find the path to the True World. His past is filled with mysteries, and Soichiro refuses to talk about the subject with Lucia. In the anime, it is thought he turned himself into a Virus so he could obtain the True World. In the manga, it appears he was possessed by Aion.

== Media ==
=== Manga ===
Venus Versus Virus began as a manga series first serialized on June 27, 2005, in the shōnen magazine Dengeki Comic Gao! published by MediaWorks. On February 27, 2008, the manga ended serialization in Dengeki Comic Gao!, but continued serialization in ASCII Media Works' manga magazine Dengeki Daioh between March 21 and July 26, 2008. Eight bound volumes have been released in Japan by ASCII Media Works under their Dengeki Comics label. The manga has since been licensed in America by Seven Seas Entertainment with the first volume released in July 2007.

Venus Versus Virus has also been published in Taiwan and Hong Kong by Kadokawa Media, in South Korea by Samyang Publish Company, in Italy by J-Pop Edizioni, in France by Soleil Productions, in Spain by Norma Editorial, in Vietnam by Kim Dong Publishing House, and in Germany by Carlsen Verlag.

No.	Original release date	Original ISBN	English release date	English ISBN
1	December 17, 2005	4-8402-3291-1	July 2007	978-1-933164-48-9
01: "Vertigo. Meetings."; 02: "Wishes. Confusion."; 03: "Fleetingness. Feelings."; 04: "Work. Signs."; 05: "Misunderstandings. Understandings."; "One-Shot [Venus Versus Virus]"
2	April 27, 2006	4-8402-3440-X	October 2007	978-1-933164-49-6
06: "Dark. World."; 07: "Sweet. Scent."; 08: "Solid. Determination."; 09: "Black. Vision."; 10: "White. Vision."
3	October 27, 2006	4-8402-3628-3	March 2008	978-1-933164-90-8
11: "Distant. Messenger."; 12: "Aged. Oaths."; 13: "Screams. Smiles."; 14: "Bitter. Destruction."; "[V.V.V.] Drama CD Recording Report"
4	January 27, 2007	978-4-8402-3744-4	June 2008	978-1-933164-93-9
15: "Misery. Aims."; 16: "Similar. Different."; 17: "Alienation. Confusion."; 18: "Sweetness. Landmines."
5	April 27, 2007	978-4-8402-3867-0	October 2008	978-1-934876-17-6
19: "Meetings. Control."; 20: "Aims. Hopes."; 21: "Red. Boundaries."; 22: "Sorrow. Imitations."
6	November 27, 2007	978-4-8402-4133-5	June 2009	978-1-934876-52-7
23: "Master and Student. Endings."; 24: "Will to Fight. True Intentions."; 25: "Red. Mimicry."; 26: "Black. Mission."; 27: "Sisters. Pair."; Extra: "Bitter. Misconceptions."
7	March 3, 2008	978-4-8402-4247-9	October 2009	978-1-934876-63-3
28: "Grief. Excuses."; 29: "Distant. Night Scenery."; 30: "Celebrations. Curses."; 31: "Writings. Determination."; 32: "One Another. Salvation."
8	September 27, 2008	978-4-04-867316-7	March 2010	978-1-934876-71-8
33: "Black. Vertigo."; 34: "Diagrams. Watches."; 35: "Narrow. Boundaries."; 36: "World. Destruction."; 37: "Wishes. Granted."

=== Drama CD ===
A drama CD based on the manga series was first released in Japan on October 25, 2006, produced by Frontier Works. The CD contained five tracks and the voice cast was different from that used in the anime adaptation. A second drama CD was released on April 4, 2007, produced by Lantis.

=== Anime ===
An anime television series adaptation was animated by Studio Hibari, directed by Shinichiro Kimura, and aired in Japan between January 11 and March 29, 2007, on the BS-i network, containing twelve episodes. The anime was made available in November 2007 on Anime Network's Video on demand setup. The anime was originally licensed by ADV Films for distribution in North America, but in July 2008, the anime became one of over thirty ADV titles transferred to Funimation Entertainment. ADV Films had also licensed Venus Versus Virus for release in Germany, but the DVDs were put on hold. MVM Entertainment released the TV series on region 2 DVD on May 30, 2022, in the original NTSC format, in the UK.

No.	Title	Original release date
1	"Innocent Invitation" "Aoi Sasoi" (アオイ サソイ)	January 11, 2007
The Venus Vanguard gets a request from a new client about a strange shadow that may be the cause of some recent disappearances. When Lucia and Sumire try to fight it, Lucia soon discovers that she will need Sumire's help more than she thought.
2	"Divergent World" "Ikei Sekai" (イケイ セカイ)	January 18, 2007
While tests are performed to help Sumire control her Berserker power, she begins to wish that her life was back to normal. When confronted by a Virus at school, she has no choice but to find some way to defeat it.
3	"Request Indication" "Irai Kehai" (イライ ケハイ)	January 25, 2007
A young girl come to the Venus Vanguard to request help after her brother starts acting cold toward her. Suspecting the cause being a Virus, Lucia and Sumire go to her house to investigate.
4	"Dizzying Meeting" "Memai Deai" (メマイ デアイ)	February 1, 2007
The story of when Sumire first met Lucia is explained. Once being told everything by Lucia, Sumire ends up joining the Venus Vanguard to help to exterminate them.
5	"Distant Messenger" "Tōi Tsukai" (トオイ ツカイ)	February 8, 2007
A new enemy named Luca appears, and she is different from a typical Virus; for one, the anti-virus bullets are not effective on her. Luca attacks Yoshiki at the park, which causes Sumire to turn the gun on herself to unleash Berserker.
6	"Bitter Damage" "Nigai Higai" (ニガイ ヒガイ)	February 15, 2007
Guy, a new foe stronger than Luca appears and Lucia tries to stop him, but gets severely injured in the process. Later, Lucia tries again, but is losing until Sumire comes to help.
7	"Deep Feelings" "Fukai Omoi" (フカイ オモイ)	February 22, 2007
As Lucia recovers from her fight with Guy, Soichiro reminisces about the past. The story begins eighteen years ago when Soichiro was with Lucia's parents before she was born.
8	"Dark Wish" "Kurai Negai" (クライ ネガイ)	March 1, 2007
Lucia starts to act cold towards Sumire and acts on her own, going after Guy, but is caught in a trap when Luca interferes.
9	"Sweet Aroma" "Amai Nioi" (アマイ ニオイ)	March 8, 2007
Sumire's and Lucia's birthday, both on July 7, is coming up, and at first Lucia does not want to celebrate her birthday. Lucia ultimately gives in and starts learning with Sumire on how to bake a cake. Meanwhile, Sumire's and Yoshiki's relationship develops further.
10	"Mistaken Objective" "Gokai Nerai" (ゴカイ ネライ)	March 15, 2007
Yoshiki and Sumire start to hang out more together, and Sumire believes him to be a very kind person. However, Lucia believes he has an ulterior motive.
11	"Intent to Sacrifice" "Gisei Satsui" (ギセイ サツイ)	March 22, 2007
Yoshiki disappears and Sumire tries to search for him alone, but is initially unsuccessful. Soichiro and Laura come back and they leave with Lucia to try to find Sumire before Lucif gets to her.
12	"White Future" "Shiroi Mirai" (シロイ ミライ)	March 29, 2007
After a short fight between Lucia and her father Lucif, Lucia initially concedes defeat when she is told she will be able to see her mother. However, the power of her eye shows her the truth behind what happened in the past and Lucia vows to destroy her father.

==== Music ====
The anime's opening theme is "Bravin' Bad Brew" by Riryka, and the ending theme is "Shijun no Zankoku" by Yousei Teikoku. The anime's original soundtrack contains background music composed by Hikaru Nanase. The soundtrack was released on April 25, 2007. A vocal CD, containing songs and monologues by four of the voice actresses from the anime, was released on March 21, 2007.

Venus Versus Virus Original Soundtrack
No.	Title	Length
1.	"Awake"	1:38
2.	"Bravin' Bad Brew (TV size)"	1:30
3.	"Key and Door"	1:40
4.	"Lucia"	1:52
5.	"Shoot Virus"	1:38
6.	"Heart of Pain"	1:49
7.	"Tense"	1:39
8.	"Sumire I"	1:54
9.	"School Life"	1:26
10.	"Classmates"	1:18
11.	"Repletion Time"	1:15
12.	"Innocent Venus"	1:07
13.	"Venus Vanguard"	1:53
14.	"Full of Interest"	1:03
15.	"A Tomboy"	1:12
16.	"Tension"	1:22
17.	"Malicious"	1:13
18.	"Divert I"	0:09
19.	"Divert II"	0:08
20.	"Temptation to Death"	1:51
21.	"Virus Attack I"	1:52
22.	"Shut Mind"	1:56
23.	"Deep Sorrow"	2:12
24.	"An Ominous Presentiment"	1:48
25.	"An Anxiety Melody"	2:07
26.	"Discord"	1:08
27.	"The Dark Invasion"	1:31
28.	"Virus Attack II"	1:55
29.	"Symptom Awaking"	1:54
30.	"Crime of Innocence"	1:43
31.	"An Affair"	1:54
32.	"Sumire II"	1:47
33.	"It Embraces by Love"	1:58
34.	"The Mother's Memory"	1:16
35.	"Sweet Scent"	1:42
36.	"Deceive"	1:51
37.	"Death Gaze"	1:37
38.	"Obstruct Operation"	1:51
39.	"A Wirepuller"	1:11
40.	"A Crisis"	1:37
41.	"Miss You…"	1:19
42.	"The Lost World"	1:22
43.	"Shijun no Zankoku (TV size) (至純の残酷 (TV size); lit. "Cruelty of Pureness")"	1:31
Total length:		66:17

Venus Versus Virus Character Vocal Album
No.	Title	Length
1.	"Watashi ga Iru Sekai (私がいる世界; lit. "My World")" (Performed by Ayahi Takagaki)	1:09
2.	"inner world" (Performed by Ayahi Takagaki)	4:23
3.	"Watashi ni Dekiru koto... (私にできること…; lit. "I Can...")" (Performed by Minori Chihara)	1:31
4.	"Only Lonely Rain" (Performed by Minori Chihara)	4:06
5.	"Madamada ne (マダマダね)" (Performed by Ayumi Tsuji)	1:00
6.	"Girls Versus Chocolate! (ガールズ ヴァーサス チョコレート!)" (Performed by Ayumi Tsuji)	3:28
7.	"Itsumo Soba ni Iru kara ne (いつも側にいるからね; lit. "Because I'm Always With You)" (Performed by Sakura Nogawa)	0:51
8.	"Yuuyake-iro ga Yondeiru (夕焼け色が呼んでいる; lit. "The Color Called 'Sunset'")" (Performed by Sakura Nogawa)	3:41
9.	"Tomo ni Ayumitai (ともに歩みたい; lit. "Let's Walk Together")" (Performed by Ayahi Takagaki and Minori Chihara)	1:30
10.	"Yami no Kagi Hikari no Tobira (闇の鍵 光の扉; lit. "Key of Darkness, Door of Light")" (Performed by Ayahi Takagaki and Minori Chihara)	3:09
Total length:		24:52
