= Ayumi Tsuji =

Japanese voice actress

- 辻あゆみ
- Occupation: Voice actress
- Agent: Mausu Promotion

Ayumi Tsuji (辻あゆみ, Tsuji Ayumi) is a Japanese voice actress from Ehime Prefecture. She is affiliated with Mausu Promotion. Her major roles are Kozue Orihara in Chaos;Head, Rose in Red Garden, Elise in Sky Girls, and Bara-tan (Baratack) in Robot Girls Z.

== Filmography ==
=== Anime ===
List of voice performances in anime
Year	Title	Role	Notes	Source
2004	Melody of Oblivion	Beautiful girl		
2004	Bleach	Suzumebachi		
2005	Best Student Council	Minamo Katsura		
2005	Idaten Jump	Children		
2005	Karin	Girl		
2006	Kagihime Monogatari Eikyū Alice Rondo	Schoolgirl		
2006	Tona-Gura!	Nīna Isokawa		
2006	Welcome to the NHK	Various characters		
2006	Black Blood Brothers	Chan		
2006	Red Garden	Rose Sheedy	Also 2007 OVA Dead Girls	
2006	Yoake Mae yori Ruriiro na:Crescent Love	Girl		
2007	Gakuen Utopia Manabi Straight!	Girls		
2007	Venus Versus Virus	Lola		
2007	Hidamari Sketch	TV sound TVの音声		
2007	Romeo × Juliet	Girl		
2007	Kaze no Stigma	Kanon Suzuhara		
2007	Sky Girls	Elise von Dietrich		
2007	Potemayo	Guchuko	Mysterious creature part 2	
2007	Prism Ark	Wel		
2007	Minami-ke	Chiaki's classmate		
2007	Shooting Star Rockman Tribe 流星のロックマン トライブ	Lana ラーナ		
2008	Persona: Trinity Soul	Tomoya Chino 茅野友哉		
2008	The Familiar of Zero: Rondo of Princesses	Beatrice		
2008	Lami 2 のらみみ2	Mimiko ミミコ		
2008	Chaos;Head	Kozue Orihara		
2008–16	夢想夏郷, 東方 (Touhou Musou Kakyou / A Summer Day's Dream)	Remilia Scarlet		
2009	The Tower of Druaga: The Sword of Uruk	Girl		
2009	Slayers Evolution-R	Girl		
2009	Slap-up Party: Arad Senki	Ixia		
2009	Gokujō!! Mecha Mote Iinchō	Rumi ルミ		
2011	Mashiroiro Symphony	Yukari Amaishi, others		
2012	The Familiar of Zero F	Beatrice		
2012	Saint Seiya Ω	Line		
2012	Paboo & Mojies	Emma Elephant エマ・エレファント		
2012	Humanity Has Declined	Mr. Fairy 妖精さん		
2013	Rozen Maiden	Girl		
2013	Maji de Otaku na English! Ribbon-chan the TV マジでオタクなイングリッシュ！りぼんちゃん the TV	Mi ミ子		
2013	Noucome	Ouka Yuouji		
2014	Robot Girls Z	Bara-tan (Baratack)		
2014	Saki: The Nationals	Hatsumi Miki 薄墨初美		
2014	Fūsen inu tinī ふうせんいぬティニー	Punny パニー		
2014	Cross Ange	Coco Reeve		
2014	Rage of Bahamut: Genesis	Raphael		
2015	Fate/stay night: Unlimited Blade Works	Homunculus	2nd season	
2022	Princess Connect! Re:Dive Season 2	Monika		

=== Video games ===
List of voice performances in video games
Year	Title	Role	Notes	Source
2005	Best Student Council	Minamo Katsura	PS1 / PS2	
2006	Blood+ Final Piece	Lamb ラム	PSP	
2008–14	Chaos;Head games	Kozue Orihara		
2009	Suggoi! Arcana Heart 2	Koito Kasuga / Kouta Kasuga / Nora Tsunberg / Mikio Inspection 春日小糸 / 春日小唄 / ノーラ・ツンベルク / 御井巡査	PS1 / PS2	
2010	Sister Quest 2	Lily		
2011	Arcana Heart 3	Eko	PS3, Xbox 360, others Also Love Max! in 2014	
2013	MapleStory	Xenon (female)	PC	
2014	Granblue Fantasy	Monika	iOS, Android, Web Browser	
2015	Princess Connect! プリンセスコネクト！	Monica Weisswind モニカ・ヴァイスヴィント		
2015	Cross Ange	Coco		
2015	Saki: The Nationals	Hatsumi Miki 薄墨初美		
2015	Criminal Girls 2 クリミナルガールズ2	Mizuki		
2015	Fire Emblem Fates	Nina	Nintendo 3DS	
2019	Fire Emblem: Three Houses	Bernadetta	Switch	
2020	Fire Emblem Heroes	Bernadetta	iOS, Android	

=== Drama CD ===
List of voice performances in drama CD
Year	Title	Role	Notes	Source
2009	Ebiten: Kōritsu Ebisugawa Kōkō Tenmonbu	Rikei Hiromatsu		
2010	Ebiten: Kōritsu Ebisugawa Kōkō Tenmonbu 2	Rikei Hiromatsu		
	Sensei ga Iroiro to Nesshin de Nemurenai	Nono		
