= List of Hitman chapters =

The cover of Hitman Volume 1 as released by Kodansha on 17 October 2018 in Japan.

Hitman (Japanese: ヒットマン, Hepburn: Hittoman) is a Japanese manga series written and illustrated by Kouji Seo. It was announced in April 2018, and ran in Kodansha's Weekly Shōnen Magazine from June 20, 2018, to February 17, 2021. Kodansha collected its chapters in thirteen tankōbon volumes, released from October 17, 2018, to March 17, 2021. The series takes place in the same universe as several of the authors other series, including Suzuka, Kimi no Iru Machi (A Town Where You Live), and Fuuka. It follows Kenzaki Ryuunosuke as he becomes a manga editor and aims to make author Takanashi Tsubasa the number one author in Japan.

== Volumes list ==
No.	Japanese release date	Japanese ISBN
1	October 17, 2018	978-4-06-513087-2
1. "Kenzaki Ryuunosuke" (剣埼龍之介); 2. "A ship and a Lighthouse" (船と灯台); 3. "Mentor" (指導社員); 4. "A Natural Sense" (天性の嗅覚); 5. "Think and Draw" (考えて描く); 6. "Weekly Shounen Magazine Editing Department" (週刊少年マガジン編集部); 7. "The Newcomer Prize Award Ceremony" (新人賞授賞式)
2	December 17, 2018	978-4-06-513492-4
8. "Swear on the Past" (過去と誓い); 9. "The Relationship Between Colleagues" (同期の関係); 10. "Afterward" (アトヒキ); 11. "Reader Survey" (読者アンケート); 12. "Returning the Favor" (恩返し); 13. "Precious Commodity" (大切な商品); 14. "If This were a Romcom..." (ラブコメなら...); 15. "The Dream of Being #1" (日本一の夢); 16. "A Bolt Out of the Blue" (青天の霹靂); 17. "Three Reasons" (3つの理由)
3	March 15, 2019	978-4-06-514448-0
18. "The Arrow of their Counterattack" (反撃の矢); 19. "Direct Negotiations" (直談判); 20. "Shimakaze Nanoka" (島風奈佳); 21. "It's so Unfair" (ずるいですよ); 22. "Praying for a Hit" (ヒット祈願); 23. "Resolve and Decision" (覚悟と決断); 24. "The Great Yakiniku War" (焼き肉の乱); 25. "Doing Things That Way" (そんなやり方); 26. "Natsume's True Intentions" (夏目の真意); 27. "Put Your Soul into It" (魂を込めて)
4	May 17, 2019	978-4-06-515141-9
28. "The Decisive Battle" (天下分け目); 29. "Secondary Heroine" (サブヒロイン); 30. "Evaluating Editors" (編集者の評価); 31. "Results and Isolation" (結果と孤立); 32. "Tsubasa's Troubles" (翼の悩み); 33. "Research and the Flash Point" (取材と火種); 34. "Taking Responsibility" (責任を負うこと); 35. "Coincidences and the Art of Negotiation" (偶然と交渉術); 36. "Asuka's Great Love Affair" (明日香の大恋愛); 37. "In Your Own Words" (自分の言葉で)
5	September 17, 2019	978-4-06-515728-2
38. "The Internet's Reactions"; 39. "The Feelings of the Fans"; 40. "Shikishima's Transformation"; 41. "An Interview and a Bolt of Lightning"; 42. "A Pro's Hidden Strength"; 43. "It's Too Late"; 44. "The Light That Pierces The Darkness"; 45. "Blue Wells"; 46. "A Pressing Matter!"; 47. "Battle of the Presentations"
6	October 17, 2019	978-4-06-517168-4
48. "Courage and Resolve"; 49. "The Death of Akitsuki Fuuka"; 50. "What Was It You Were Feeling?"; 51. "The First and Last"; 52. "An Undrawable Situation"; 53. "Everyone's Feelings and Tears"; 54. "Without so Much as a Warning"; 55. "For the First Time"; 56. "Nanao Yukako"; 57. "Justification and a Photo Shoot"
7	December 17, 2019	978-4-06-517548-4
58. "The Teppanyaki Affair"; 59. "A Brand New Expression"; 60. "Swimsuits and Publicity"; 61. "Date in Okinawa"; 62. "Baring Themselves"; 63. "You, Me, and Our Night in Okinawa"; 64. "A New Day"; 65. "Forbidden Love"; 66. "Unexpectedly Called Upon"; 67. "Ups and Downs of a New Serialization"
8	March 17, 2020	978-4-06-518268-0
68. "Kasuga-sensei's Claim"; 69. "The Struggle Continues"; 70. "Kasuga-sensei's Thoughts"; 71. "While Drinking a Macallan"; 72. "Respective Paths"; 73. "Anime Production Cmomittee"; 74. "What A Director Needs"; 75. "Audition"; 76. "All-in"; 77. "The Female President's Task"
9	May 15, 2020	978-4-06-518857-6
78. "Vocal Coach"; 79. "Both Sides' Opinions"; 80. "Anime VS. Original Work"; 81. "Backup Band!"; 82. "Together Even Longer"; 83. "How to Use 15 Minutes"; 84. "Dubbing in Dialect"; 85. "The Broadcast Night"; 86. "The Anime's Reception"; 87. "Autograph Session and Girls Talk"
10	July 17, 2020	978-4-06-520109-1
88. "The Day After the Confession"; 89. "The Matchmaking Goddess"; 90. "Shimane & Lovesickness"; 91. "Kenzaki's Answer"; 92. "Great Detective Furu-tan"; 93. "Gig in Fukushima"; 94. "Intertwined Misunderstandings"; 95. "An Artist's Feelings"; 96. "The Anonymous Author and the Frenchwoman"; 97. "An Amateur's Reasons"
11	October 16, 2020	978-4-06-521016-1
12	December 17, 2020	978-4-06-521634-7
13	March 17, 2021	978-4-06-522654-4
