= List of Fuuka chapters =

The chapters of the Japanese manga Fuuka, written and illustrated by Kōji Seo.

== Volume list ==
No.	Original release date	Original ISBN	English release date	English ISBN
1	16 May 2014	978-4-06-395086-1	November 3, 2015 (digital)	9781682330531
1. "Fuuka" (風夏, Fuuka); 2. "You're So Weird!" (変なヤツ!, Hen'na Yatsu!); 3. "The Reason for Her Tears!" (泣き顔の理由!, Nakigao no Riyū!); 4. "When I Get Serious!" (私の本気!, Watashi no Honki!); 5. "Coming Out!" (カミングアウト!, Kamingu Auto!); 6. "Take Flight!" (はばたけ!, Habatake!); 7. "Promise!" (約束!, Yakusoku!); 8. "Stage!" (ステージ!, Sutēji!); Extra edition. "What I Want!" (欲しい物!, Hoshii Mono!)
2	17 July 2014	978-4-06-395133-2	November 3, 2015 (digital)	9781682330548
9. "Unrequited Love!" (片想い!, Kataomoi!); 10. "Band!" (バンド!, Bando!); 11. "Louder!" (大きな声で!, Ōkina Koe de!); 12. "Under the Starry Sky!" (星空の下!, Hoshizora no Shita!); 13. "All Along!" (とっくに!, Tokkuni!); 14. "Triangle!" (トライアングル!, Toraianguru!); 15. "Fight!" (ケンカ!, Kenka!); 16. "The Five!" (あの5人!, Ano Go Hito!); 17. "Do-Do-Do-Do!" (ドドドド!, Dodododo!); Extra edition. "Silver Medal!" (銀メダル!, Gin Medaru!)
3	17 October 2014	978-4-06-395223-0	November 10, 2015 (digital)	9781682330555
18. "Overwhelming!" (圧倒的な!, Attōtekina!); 19. "Two of Us!" (2人!, Futari!); 20. "Problem Child!" (問題児!, Mondaiji!); 21. "One of Us!" (仲間!, Nakama!); 22. "A Band is...!" (バンドって!, Bando tte!); 23. "Glad!" (よかった!, Yokatta!); 24. "Renewal of the Promise!" (約束の更新!, Yakusoku no Kōshin!); 25. "Blown Up!" (大炎上!, Dai Enjō!); 26. "Me at Dawn!" (夜明けの僕!, Yoake no Boku!); 27. "Legend!" (伝説!, Densetsu!); Extra edition. "Scoop!" (スクープ!, Sukūpu!)
4	17 December 2014	978-4-06-395272-8	November 17, 2015 (digital)	9781682330562
28. "My Bass!" (ベースが!, Bēsu ga!); 29. "Awesome!" (すごい!, Sugoi!); 30. "Top!" (トップ!, Toppu!); 31. "That's Okay, Right?!" (いいよね!, Ii yo ne!); 32. "No!" (イヤ!, Iya!); 33. "Since!" (優くんが!, Yū-kun ga!); 34. "Timing!" (タイミング!, Taimingu!); 35. "Fate!" (運命!, Unmei!); 36. "Live Music Club!" (ライブハウス!, Raibu Hausu!); Special edition. "Koyuki" (小雪, Koyuki); Drawing down extra edition. "When the Music Started" (ハジマリノウタ, Hajimarinōta)
5	17 February 2015	978-4-06-395320-6	November 24, 2015 (digital)	9781682330579
37. "Waiting for Someone." (待ってる人。, Matteru Hito.); 38. "What's There." (何がある。, Nani ga Aru.); 39. "Somewhere in this World." (世界のどこか。, Sekai no Doko ka.); 40. "You're Not Cut Out for It." (向いてないよ。, Mui Teinai yo.); 41. "Reboot." (リブート。, Ribūto); 42. "My Experiences from Then." (あの時の経験。, Ano Toki no Keiken.); 43. "Eyes." (瞳。, Hitomi.); 44. "Serious." (本気。, Honki.); 45. "This Song." (この曲。, Kono Kyoku.); 46. "Ours." (僕達の。, Bokutachi no.)
6	15 May 2015	978-4-06-395397-8	January 5, 2016 (digital)	9781682330586
47. "The Least We'll Have to Do." (それくらいのこと。, Sore Kurai no Koto.); 48. "The Town Where the Stars Fall." (星の降る町。, Hoshi no Furu Machi.); 49. "Dramatic." (ドラマチック。, Doramachikku.); 50. "Songs that Sell." (売れる曲。, Ureru Kyoku.); 51. "Crappy Show." (クソライブ。, Kuso Raibu.); 52. "Because it's Fun." (楽しいから。, Tanoshii kara.); 53. "A Higher Place." (高い所。, Takai Tokoro.); 54. "Serious Battle." (ガチバトル。, Gachi Batoru.); 55. "The Audience we Want to Reach." (届けたい相手。, Todoketai Aite.); ?. "Fuuka." (風夏, Fuuka)
7	17 July 2015	978-4-06-395439-5	January 19, 2016 (digital)	9781682331477
56. "Just One Thing." (ひとつだけ。, Hitotsu Dake.); 57. "Hesitation." (躊躇。, Chūcho.); 58. "Graduation." (卒業。, Sotsugyō.); 59. "Production Company." (事務所。, Jimusho.); 60. "Sharing a House." (シェアハウス。, Shea Hausu.); 61. "To the Budoukan." (武道館に。, Budōkan ni.); 62. "Aura." (オーラ。, Ōra.); 63. "Expectations." (期待。, Kitai.); 64. "What's Fun." (楽しいコト。, Tanoshii Koto.); 65. "We Can't." (できません。, Dekimasen.); Extra edition. "Sara Iwami" (石見沙羅, Iwami Sara)
8	16 October 2015	978-4-06-395517-0	January 26, 2016 (digital)	9781682331484
66. "Days of Nothing." (なんでもない日々。, Nan Demonai Hibi.); 67. "Our Way." (僕らのやり方。, Bokura no Yarikata.); 68. "You Can Fly." (ユー・キャン・フライ。, Yū・Kyan・Furai.); 69. "Miracle." (キセキ。, Kiseki.); 70. "Report." (報告。, Hōkoku.); 71. "A Place Where the Wind Blows." (風の吹く場所。, Kaze no Fuku Basho.); 72. "Rabbitz." (ラビッツ。, Rabittsu.); 73. "Reunion." (再会。, Saikai.); 74. "For You." (フォー・ユー。, Fō・Yū.); 75. "Bye Bye." (バイバイ。, Bai Bai.)
9	17 December 2015	978-4-06-395564-4	October 25, 2016 (digital)	9781682334065
76. "Something is About to Start!" (始まりの予感!, Hajimari no Yokan!); 77. "Lessons from the Masters!" (師匠の教え!, Shishō no Oshie!); 78. "Koyuki's Feelings!" (小雪の想い!, Koyuki no Omoi!); 79. "Without Thinking!" (思わず!, Omowazu!); 80. "Curious!" (気になる!, Ki ni Naru!); 81. "Visiting the Sick!" (お見舞い!, O Mimai!); 82. "East!" (EAST!, Īsuto!); 83. "Direct Negotiation!" (直談判!, Jikadanpan!); 84. "Selfish!" (ワガママ!, Wagamama!); 85. "A Reason!" (キッカケ!, Kikkake!)
10	17 March 2016	978-4-06-395619-1	November 8, 2016 (digital)	9781682334072
86. "Genius Producer!" (天才プロデューサー!, Tensai Purode~yūsā!); 87. "Fall Moon!" (フォール・ムーン!, Fōru・Mūn!); 88. "Shelly Hornet!" (シェリー・ホーネット!, Sherī Hōnetto!); 89. "Hope for Tomorrow!" (明日への希望!, Ashita e no Kibō!); 90. "Recording!" (レコーディング!, Rekōdingu!); 91. "At the Lake's Edge!" (湖のほとりで!, Mizuumi no Hotori de!); 92. "Incredible Sound!" (すごい音!, Sugoi Oto!); 93. "Who'll Be Number One!" (一番に!, Ichiban ni!); 94. "Pre-party!" (前夜祭!, Zen'yasai!); 95. "Opening!" (開幕!, Kaimaku!); ?. "Om-Rice!" (オムライス!, Omu Raisu!)
11	17 May 2016	978-4-06-395671-9	November 22, 2016 (digital)	9781682334089
96. "Clash!" (激突!, Gekitotsu!); 97. "Day Two!" (2日目!, 2-Nichi-me!); 98. "Collaboration!" (コラボレーション!, Koraborēshon!); 99. "Our Wings!" (僕らの翼!, Bokura no Tsubasa!); 100. "The Best Night!" (最高の夜!, Saikō no Yoru!); 101. "Precious Song!" (大切な曲!, Taisetsuna Kyoku!); 102. "The Hopes Handed Down." (受け継がれる想い。, Uketsuga Reru Omoi.); 103. "Just Maybe." (もしかして。, Moshikashite.); 104. "365 Days." (365日。, 365-Nichi.); 105. "The Truth Revealed." (告げられた真実。, Tsuge Rareta Shinjitsu.)
12	17 August 2016	978-4-06-395732-7	July 4, 2017 (digital)	9781682337721
106. "She Said She was Quitting Work." (バイトやめたってよ。, Baito Yame Tatte yo.); 107. "In Jougasaki." (城ヶ崎にて。, Jōgasaki nite.); 108. "Father." (父親。, Chichioya.); 109. "The Reason I Came to See You." (会いに来た理由。, Ai ni Kita Riyū.); 110. "Blue Wells." (ブルーウェルズ!, Burūu Werusu!); 111. "Under the Same Roof." (一つ屋根の下。, Hitotsu no Yane no Shita.); 112. "What I Want to Do!" (やりたいこと!, Yaritai Koto!); 113. "The Price for Performing." (再結成の代償。, Sai Kessei no Daishō.); 114. "Full Moon!" (フルムーン!, Furu Mūn!); 115. "Tour and Friends." (ツアーと仲間。, Tsuā to Nakama.); ?. "Japanese Food!" (じゃぱにーず・ふーど!, Japanīzu・Fūdo!)
13	16 December 2016	978-4-06-395825-6	August 15, 2017 (digital)	9781682338001
116. "The Tour Begins!" (ツアースタート!, Tsuā Sutāto!); 117. "Why She's Sleepy." (眠たい理由。, Nemutai Riyū.); 118. "I don't Mind." (それでもいい。, Sore Demo Ii.); 119. "Fuuka!" (風夏!, Fuuka!); 120. "Something with Value." (価値があるモノ。, Kachi ga aru Mono.); 121. "Baptism into Touring!" (ツアーの洗礼!, Tsua no Senrei!); 122. "The Band that Succeeds Us." (受け継ぐバンド。, Uketsugu Bando.); 123. "Kanaria!" (カナリア!, Kanaria!); 124. "Something feels Off." (違和感。, Iwakan.); 125. "Favorite Song!" (一番好きな曲!, Ichiban Sukina Kyoku!)
14	18 January 2017	978-4-06-395851-5	September 16, 2017 (digital)	9781682338018
126. "Weekend Band!" (週末バンド!, Shūmatsu Bando!); 127. "The Rest of the Dream." (夢の続きを。, Yume no Tsudzuki o.); 128. "Fried Skewers!" (串かつ!, Kushikatsu!); 129. "Kaede's Circumstances" (椛の事情, Momiji no Jijō); 130. "That Feeling!" (その想いを!, Sono Omoi o!); 131. "Wishes and Hopes." (願いと希望。, Negai to Kibō.); 132. "What The Family Was Like." (家族の風景。, Kazoku no Fūkei.); 133. "Play It Again!" (もっかい聴かせたれ!, Mokkai Kika Setare!); 134. "New Year's Shrine Visit!" (初詣!, Hatsumōde!); 135. "Fukuoka!" (福岡!, Fukuoka!); ?. "Christmas!" (クリスマス!, Kurisumasu!)
15	17 March 2017	978-4-06-395892-8	January 19, 2018 (digital)	9781642120707
136. "Shaken!" (動揺。, Dōyō.); 137. "New Song!" (新曲!, Shinkyoku!); 138. "Recollection" (追憶。, Tsuioku.); 139. "What To Say To Whom." (誰に何を。, Dare ni Nani o.); 140. "The Day Before." (前日。, Zenjitsu.); 141. "Not That Kind of Girl!" (こんな子じゃない!, Konna ko Janai!); 142. "Wait a Minute!" (ちょっと待って!, Chotto Matte!); 143. "Decision and Flight!" (決断と飛翔!, Ketsudan to Hishō!); 144. "Hot Breeze!" (熱い風!, Atsui Kaze!); 145. "Why I Wanted To Be That Way." (なりたい理由。, Naritai Riyū)
16	16 June 2017	978-4-06-395960-4	February 20, 2018 (digital)	9781642120936
146. "Answer!" (返事!, Henji!); 147. "Cherry Trees At Night!" (夜桜!, Yozakura!); 148. "We're Back!" (ただいま!, Tadaima!); 149. "What I Want To Give." (渡したいモノ。, Watashitai Mono.); 150. "From Now On!" (これからのこと!, Korekara no Koto!); 151. "Just The Two of Us." (ふたりきり。, Futari Kiri.); 152. "Mogami's Answer." (最上の回答。, Saijō no Kaitō.); 153. "How It Came To Be." (成り立ち!, Naritachi!); 154. "That's When It Begins." (そこから始まる。, Soko Kara Hajimaru.); 155. "The Concert That Starts It All!" (はじまりのライブ!, Hajimari no Raibu!)
17	15 September 2017	978-4-06-510190-2	March 20, 2018 (digital)	9781642120943
156. "A Serious Attitude." (本気の姿勢。, Honki no Shisei.); 157. "The Most Awesome There Is!" (最高にカッコイイ！, Saikō ni Kakkoii!); 158. "White Falcon." (ホワイトファルコン。, Howaito Farukon.); 159. "Local Music!" (本場の音楽！, Honba no Ongaku!); 160. "Native!" (ネイティブ！, Neitibu!); 161. "English!" (いんぐりっしゅ！, Ingurisshu!); 162. "Yuu's Charm" (優の魅力。, Yū no Miryoku.); 163. "Beneath the Cherry Blossom Trees" (桃の木の下で。, Momo no Ki no Shita de.); 164. "Repetition!" (反復！, Hanpuku!); 165. "After a Month." (1か月ぶり。, Ichi ka Getsu Buri.)
18	11 November 2017	978-4-06-510369-2	June 19, 2018 (digital)	9781642122831
166. "Send Out!" (発信！, Hasshin!); 167. "Stagnant." (停滞。, Teitai.); 168. "A Push!" (後押し！, Atooshi!); 169. "Starting Point." (原点。, Genten.); 170. "The Pulse of a Miracle!" (奇跡の鼓動！, Kiseki no Kodō!); 171. "Visitors." (来訪者。, Raihōsha.); 172. "Challenge Letter!" (挑戦状！, Chōsenjō!); 173. "Each of Their Plans." (それぞれの思惑。, Sorezore no Omowaku.); 174. "Something Important to Say!" (大事な話！, Daijina Hanashi!); 175. "The Fist of Determination." (決意の拳, Ketsui no Kobushi.)
19	16 February 2018	978-4-06-510973-1	July 24, 2018 (digital)	9781642123128
176. "One More Month!" (あと1か月！, Ato Ichi ka Getsu!); 177. "A War Of Words on the Eve of the Show!" (前夜の舌戦！, Zenya no Zessen!); 178. "On a Night Like This." (こんな夜に。, Konna Yoru ni.); 179. "Sucker Punch!" (先制パンチ！, Sensei Panchi!); 180. "Comeback!" (復活！, Fukkatsu!); 181. "Succession." (継承。, Keishō.); 182. "The Dream We'd Thrown Away." (捨てたハズの夢。, Suteta Hazu no Yume.); 183. "To Hell With That!" (ふざけんじゃねェ！, Fuzakenjanē!); 184. "A Festival Where You Live." (君のいるフェス。, Kimi no Iro Fesu.); 185. "As Rivals!" (ライバルとして！, Raibaru toshite!)
20	17 April 2018	978-4-06-511242-7	January 8, 2019 (digital)	9781642126402
186. "This is My Wish." (私の願いだから, Watashi no Negai Da kara.); 187. "Wings of Light!" (光の翼！, Hikari no Tsubasa!); 188. "Signs of Growth." (成長の印。, Seichō no Shiroshi.); 189. "A Manager's Job." (マネージャーの仕事。, Manējā no Shigoto.); 190. "A Band Goddess!" (バンドの女神！, Bando no Megami!); 191. "Session!" (セッション！, Sesshon!); 192. "Encore." (アンコール。, Ankōru.); 193. "Hedgehogs." (ヘッジホッグス。, Hejjihoggusu.); 194. "That Day With You." (あの日キミと。, Ano Hi Kimi to.); 195. "Fuuka" (風夏, Fūka)
