= Umine the Island Inn =

Japanese manga series

- First tankōbon volume cover

あの島の海音荘 (Ano Shima no Umine-sō)
- Genre: Harem; Romantic comedy
- Manga
- Written by: Kōji Seo
- Published by: Kodansha
- English publisher: Kodansha (digital)
- Imprint: Shōnen Magazine Comics
- Magazine: Weekly Shōnen Magazine
- Original run: January 14, 2026 – present
- Volumes: 3

Umine the Island Inn (Japanese: あの島の海音荘, Hepburn: Ano Shima no Umine-sō) is a Japanese manga series written and illustrated by Kōji Seo. It began serialization in Kodansha's Weekly Shōnen Magazine in January 2026, and has been compiled into three volumes as of September 2026.

== Plot ==
Kazuma Shiozaki, a 19-year-old high school graduate, has just arrived in Asagiri Island to work at Umine Inn, an all-female boarding house and cafe run by his aunt Aya. Asagiri is said to be home to long-lost pirate treasure. While there, he gets to know the inn's residents, all of whom have their own eccentricities and interests. As Kazuma learns to adjust to island life, he finds out that life here is more interesting than he initially thought.

== Characters ==
Kazuma Shiozaki (潮崎 一馬, Shiozaki Kazuma)
The protagonist, he moved to Asagiri Island in order to look for work, having been unemployed since graduating from high school. He is skilled in martial arts, having been trained by the Tsuruga school. He trained under Ami Tsuruga, a character from Seo's previous series The Café Terrace and Its Goddesses.
Yuna Asagiri (朝霧 夕凪, Asagiri Yuna)
A high school student and a resident of Umine Inn. She is cold towards Kazuma when they first meet, but she quickly changes after he saves her from an encounter. She is interested in finding treasure on the island told to her by her late grandfather, and wants Kazuma's help in finding it.
Rinko Ichinose (一之瀬 凛子, Ichinose Rinko)
A resident of Umine Inn who currently works as a hostess.
Iori Sugiyama (杉山 伊織, Sugiyama Iori)
A 21-year-resident of Umine Inn who moved to Asagiri Island to take over her late grandfather's sake business, turning it into a shōchū distillery. She previously worked at a factory in Tokyo.
Sakura Shindo (新堂 桜, Shindō Sakura)
A girl who moves into Umine Inn. She met Kazuma a year prior to the start of the story, after he rescued her while he was training in the mountains. She is secretly a kunoichi and arrived in the island after her family tasked her with killing Kazuma; however, as she has developed feelings for him, she is unable to push through.
Ren Nanakawa (七川 連, Nanakawa Ren)
Kazuma's childhood friend and rival, and a karate champion. She came to the island to defeat him, as he was the only person to ever beat her in a fight despite handicapping himself. Apart from karate, she also works as a fashion model and influencer, having about one million followers.
Aya Shiozaki (潮崎 彩, Shiozaki Aya)
Kazuma's aunt, who runs Umine Inn. She is his mother's younger sister.
Saki Shiozaki (潮崎 咲, Shiozaki Saki)
Kazuma's cousin and Aya's daughter.
Nagisa Asagiri (朝霧 渚, Asagiri Nagisa)
Yuna's older sister.

== Publication ==
The series is written and illustrated by Kōji Seo, who began serializing it in Kodansha's Weekly Shōnen Magazine on January 14, 2026, two months after his previous series The Café Terrace and Its Goddesses ended. The first tankōbon volume was released on April 16, 2026; two volumes have been released as of September 16, 2026. The series is also serialized simultaneously in English on Kodansha's K Manga service.

| No. | Release date | ISBN |
|---|---|---|
| 1 | April 16, 2026 | 978-4-06-543325-6 |
1. "Umine Inn" (海音荘, Umine-sō); 2. "A Secret Passage" (ヒミツのヌけ穴, Himitsu no Nuke Ana); 3. "An Ocean Date" (海デート, Umi Dēto); 4. "Iori's Alcohol" (伊織の酒, Iori no Sake); 5. "Kazuma's Girlfriend" (兄の彼女, Ani no Kanojo); 6. "Let the Treasure Hunt Begin!" (宝探しスタート!, Takarasagashi Sutāto!); 7. "Sakura Shindo" (新堂 桜, Shindō Sakura)
| 2 | July 16, 2026 | 978-4-06-543907-4 |
8. "Hidden Love" (忍ぶ恋, Shinobu Koi); 9. "Secret" (ヒミツ, Himitsu); 10. "We're All Going to the Beach!" (みんなで海!, Minna de Umi!); 11. "The Sign" (看板, Kanban); 12. "Reality" (現実, Genjitsu); 13. "A Big Summertime Harvesting Spree!" (大収穫祭!, Dai Shūkakusai!); 14. "Sakura-Colored Days" (桜色の日々, Sakurairo no Hibi); 15. "Sensei" (先生); 16. "Family" (家族, Kazoku); 17. "Ren Nanakawa" (七川蓮, Nanakawa Ren)
| 3 | September 16, 2026 | 978-4-06-544982-0 |
18. "Looking Up to Kazuma" (憧れの一馬, Akogare no Kazuma); 19. "A Rival in Love" (恋敵, Koi Gataki); 20. "Home Tutor" (家庭教師, Kateikyōshi); 21. "Home Survey?" (実家調査?, Jikka Chōsa?); 22. "The Second Scroll" (二つ目の巻物, Futatsume no Makimono); 23. "Yuna's Secret" (夕凪の秘密, Yuna no Himitsu); 24. "Yuna's Inner Feelings" (夕凪の心の内, Yuna no Kokoro no Uchi); 25. "A Beauty Comes Ashore" (美女上陸, Bijo Jōriku); 26. "Pervy Tutelage" (エロ上忍, Ero Jōnin); 27. "Kazuma Watch" (一馬観察, Kazuma Kansatsu)

=== Chapters not yet in tankōbon format ===
These chapters have yet to be published in a tankōbon volume.

28. "The Four Hevenly Kings" (四天王, Shitennō)
29. "Welcome Party" (歓迎会, Kangeikai)
30. "The Four Heavenly Kings Return" (四天王再び, Shitennō Futatabi)
31. "The Invincible Fist of the Azuma School" (吾妻流無敵拳, Azumaryū Muteki Ken)
32. "Hero" (正義の味方, Seigi no Mikata)
33. "Master" (師匠, Shishō)
34. "Saying Thanks the Umine Inn Way" (海音荘流御礼, Umine sō Ryū Orei)
35. "A Disturbance in the Outdoor Bath" (露天風呂の変, Rotenburo no Hen)
36. "An Irori for Iori" (伊織の囲炉裏, Iori no Iori)
37. "The Third Scroll" (三つ目の巻物, Mittsume no Makimono)
