= Hikari Kodama =

Japanese singer and voice actress (born 2000)

Hikari Kodama 小玉 ひかり
- Born: February 14, 2000 (age 26); Chiba Prefecture, Japan
- Occupations: Singer, voice actress
- Years active: 2013–present
- Labels: Music Ray'n; JVR Music (2023–present); Ocean Butterflies (2013–2022)
- Website: www.codamappi.com

Hikari Kodama (小玉 ひかり, Kodama Hikari; born February 14, 2000) is a Japanese singer and voice actress from Chiba Prefecture who is affiliated with Music Ray'n. Beginning her music career at the age of 13, she first became involved in the anime industry when she became the singing voice of the character Grace in the series Vivy: Fluorite Eye's Song. She made her major debut in 2023, with her songs being used in the anime series Girlfriend, Girlfriend and The Café Terrace and Its Goddesses.

== Biography ==
Kodama was born on February 14, 2000. Her interest in music began at a young age when she started taking piano lessons at the age of four. She first became interested in becoming a musician after seeing Angela Aki on television. It became her dream to become a singer-songwriter, to the point that she would write her own songs even as an elementary student.

Kodama began seriously pursuing a career in music during her last year of junior high school when she became affiliated with an agency following an audition. After graduating from junior high, she had to keep her music activities a secret as her high school was strict regarding extracurricular activities. To avoid being identified, she would perform wearing a wig, while videos of her performances would be shot from a distance. She enrolled at Rikkyo University after finishing high school, where she was able to continue her music activities more freely. While attending university, she became a member of the acoustic unit Plusonica, which she was a part of from 2016 to 2023.

Kodama's involvement with anime began when she became the singing voice of the character Grace in the 2021 television series Vivy: Fluorite Eye's Song. In 2023, she made her major debut as a solo singer under Music Ray'n with the release of her first single "Dramatic ni Koi Shitai" (ドラマチックに恋したい), the title song of which was used as the opening theme to the second season of the anime series Girlfriend, Girlfriend. She also debuted as a voice actress, voicing the character Chris in the anime series Kizuna no Allele. In 2024 she released the single "Charge!" (チャージ！), the title song of which was used as the opening theme to the second season of the anime series The Café Terrace and Its Goddesses.
