= A Town Where You Live =

Japanese manga and anime series

- Manga volume 24 cover, featuring Haruto Kirishima (left) and Yuzuki Eba

君のいる町 (Kimi no Iru Machi)
- Genre: Drama, romance
- Manga
- Written by: Kōji Seo
- Published by: Kodansha
- English publisher: NA: Crunchyroll
- Imprint: Shōnen Magazine Comics
- Magazine: Weekly Shōnen Magazine
- English magazine: NA: Crunchyroll Manga
- Original run: May 28, 2008 – February 12, 2014
- Volumes: 27 + special
- Original video animation

A Town Where You Live: Twilight Intersection
- Directed by: Yasuhiro Yoshiura (chief); Hiroshi Kobayashi
- Written by: Momoko Murakami
- Music by: Saki
- Studio: Tatsunoko Production
- Released: March 16, 2012 – June 15, 2012
- Episodes: 2
- Anime television series
- Directed by: Shigeyasu Yamauchi
- Produced by: Makoto Furukawa; Hajime Yoda; Yōsuke Takabayashi
- Written by: Reiko Yoshida
- Music by: Keiichi Oku
- Studio: Gonzo
- Licensed by: NA: Nozomi Entertainment
- Original network: TXN (TV Tokyo), HOME, AT-X
- Original run: July 13, 2013 – September 28, 2013
- Episodes: 12
- Original video animation
- Directed by: Shigeyasu Yamauchi
- Written by: Reiko Yoshida
- Music by: Keiichi Oku
- Studio: Gonzo
- Released: January 17, 2014 – March 17, 2014
- Episodes: 2
- icon

A Town Where You Live (Japanese: 君のいる町, Hepburn: Kimi no Iru Machi) is a Japanese manga series written and illustrated by Kōji Seo. It was serialized in Kodansha's Weekly Shōnen Magazine from May 2008 to February 2014 and the chapters collected into 27 tankōbon volumes. The series follows the daily life of Haruto Kirishima as he becomes enamored with Yuzuki Eba.

A story arc from A Town Where You Live was adapted into an original video animation series called A Town Where You Live: Twilight Intersection by Tatsunoko Production in 2012. An anime television series adaptation animated by Gonzo aired from July to September 2013, later spawning a radio program, drama CD, and an image song. Reception towards the manga was mixed with reviewers praising the plot for its realism or panning it as predictable and cliché.

== Plot ==
Haruto Kirishima, a high school student in rural Hiroshima Prefecture, lives a quiet life until Yuzuki Eba, the daughter of his father's acquaintance, arrives from Tokyo to stay at his home. Though initially focused on his longtime affection for his classmate Nanami Kanzaki, Haruto gradually grows closer to Yuzuki, despite her strained relationship with her sister-in-law, Rin Eba. After resolving family issues, Yuzuki returns to Tokyo, prompting Haruto to realize his feelings for her. He confesses, and the two begin a long-distance relationship. However, their connection falters when Yuzuki abruptly cuts ties, informing Haruto that she is now dating someone else.

Determined to uncover the truth, Haruto moves to Tokyo, staying at his sister's apartment and transferring schools. There, he befriends Asuka Mishima and Kyosuke Kazama, eventually discovering that Yuzuki's new partner is Kyosuke himself. Kyosuke, suffering from a terminal illness, pursues his dream of becoming a motorcycle racer but passes away after surgery. Grief-stricken, Yuzuki distances herself from Haruto, who later begins dating Asuka during college. A chance reunion with Yuzuki rekindles their connection, and they resume contact.

During a summer trip to Hiroshima with the Eba siblings, Haruto and Yuzuki revisit shared memories, leading Haruto to reaffirm his love for her. Choosing Yuzuki over Asuka strains his friendships, and Yuzuki's father opposes their relationship. Undeterred, the two elope, renting an apartment together. They navigate life alongside eccentric neighbors like Hoshina, a woman with a fear of men, and Miyanaga, a student at Yuzuki's cram school. Over time, Yuzuki's family accepts their relationship, and Haruto reconciles with his estranged friends.

After graduating, Haruto takes a job in Kochi while Yuzuki remains in Tokyo to pursue teaching. Their long-distance relationship falters under the pressures of work and exhaustion, leading to a temporary separation. When Haruto is reassigned to Tokyo, they reunite at Toyama Park and eventually marry. In later years, they operate Kirishima Shokudo, with Yuzuki assisting during school breaks. Their son and Fuuka Akizuki, the protagonist of a subsequent story, make appearances. Meanwhile, Asuka becomes a star player for Japan's women's softball team, and Kyosuke's helmet is displayed in the restaurant as a memento.

== Characters ==
Haruto Kirishima (桐島 青大, Kirishima Haruto)

Haruto is a high school student in Shōbara, Hiroshima. He has an earnest personality and chastises others when they are in the wrong. Because he often cooks for his family and friends, Haruto is skilled at cooking and considers it as a possible career. His older sister Aoi (Note: 桐島 葵, Kirishima Aoi)^{Ch. 19} lives in Tokyo in the dorm room next to the Akitsukis from Suzuka.^{Ch. 80} He has a long-time crush on classmate Nanami Kanzaki, but his feelings shift towards Yuzuki as the series progresses. At the end of the series, he marries Yuzuki, has a son named Daiki, and opens up his own restaurant.^{Ch. 261} In both Tatsunoko Production's and Gonzo's anime, he is voiced by Yoshimasa Hosoya.

Yuzuki Eba (枝葉 柚希, Eba Yuzuki)

Years prior to the series, Yuzuki attends a summer festival in Shōbara where she befriends Haruto. There, Haruto tells her to return if she is ever troubled.^{Ch. 23} Since then, she grew fond of Haruto and plans to visit him one day.^{Ch. 162} After her father's remarriage, Yuzuki feels estranged by her family and decides to attend school in Shōbara.^{Ch. 29} Due to Haruto's intervention, Yuzuki is able to mend her relationship with her step-family, prompting her to return to Tokyo.^{Ch. 50} There, the terminally ill Kyousuke Kazama asks Yuzuki to be his girlfriend for the remainder of his lifespan.^{Ch. 92} Following Kyousuke's death, Yuzuki decides to stop seeing Haruto out of guilt.^{Ch. 100} Reunited two years later, the two reaffirm their love, and begin dating. At the end of the series, she married Haruto and they have a son named Daiki.^{Ch. 141} In both Tatsunoko Production's and Gonzo's anime, she is voiced by Megumi Nakajima.

=== Hiroshima characters ===
- Takashi Yura (由良 尊, Yura Takashi) is Haruto's childhood friend. He is unpopular with women and faces rejection regularly.^{Ch. 79} In college, he begins dating Kiyomi Asakura,^{Ch. 166} whom he later marries when she becomes pregnant.^{Ch. 225} In both Tatsunoko Production's and Gonzo's anime, he is voiced by Toshiki Masuda.
- Akari Kaga (加賀 月, Kaga Akari) is Haruto and Takashi's childhood friend. She is half Russian and half Japanese which gives her blond hair and blue eyes.^{Ch. 78.5} After her father becomes ill, Akari drops out of university and returns to Hiroshima for work.^{Ch. 187} She marries Nanami's brother Narumi, but beforehand, confesses her love to Haruto one last time to settle her feelings for him.^{Ch. 219} In both Tatsunoko Production's and Gonzo's anime, she is voiced by Nana Kouno.
- Nanami Kanzaki (神咲 七海, Kanzaki Nanami) is Haruto's classmate since middle school. She has an older brother named Narumi (Note: 神咲 成海, Kanzaki Narumi). Due to Yuzuki's efforts, Haruto is able to become close with Nanami and earns her affection. However, she postpones and rejects Haruto's confession as she sees Haruto's love towards Yuzuki.^{Ch. 39} At Seijo University, she eventually dates another guy.^{Ch. 208} In Tatsunoko Production's anime, she is voiced by Saori Hayami. In Gonzo's anime, she is voiced by Yuki Takao.
- Shiho Amagi (天城 紫歩, Amagi Shiho) is a girl Haruto meets during his summer job in a restaurant.^{Ch. 63} She aspires to be a chef and is highly skilled and devoted to that profession; because of this, she is strict towards her co-workers. Three years later, she runs her own restaurant in Tokyo where Haruto works during his university years.^{Ch. 190}

=== Tokyo characters ===
- Rin Eba (枝葉 懍, Eba Rin) is Yuzuki's step-sister. She has a mischievous personality and enjoys flirting with Haruto.^{Ch. 124} After learning that Haruto and Yuzuki had sex, she realizes that she loves Haruto and feels saddened by this revelation.^{Ch. 202} She later appears in Hitman, another manga by Kōji Seo, where is the CEO of a mobile game company. In Tatsunoko Production's anime, she is voiced by Aoi Yuuki. In Gonzo's anime, she is voiced by Saki Fujita.
- Asuka Mishima (御島 明日香, Mishima Asuka) is Haruto's neighbor and classmate after his transfer to Tokyo.^{Ch. 81} Following Kyousuke's death and Haruto and Yuzuki's decision to stop seeing each other, she and Haruto begin dating.^{Ch. 106} At the end of the series, she is a pitcher on Japan's national baseball team.^{Ch. 261} She later appears in Hitman, where the protagonist is assigned to make a manga based on her life. In Gonzo's anime, she is voiced by Ayane Sakura.
- Kyousuke Kazama (風間 恭輔, Kazama Kyōsuke) is Yuzuki's senior at school and becomes friends with Haruto. He uses his terminal illness to make Yuzuki his girlfriend.^{Ch. 92} Upon learning about Yuzuki's relationship with Haruto, Kyousuke decides to undergo a risky surgery to cure his ailment and to win Yuzuki's love fairly; the surgery results in his death.^{Ch. 100} In Gonzo's anime series, he is voiced by Daisuke Ono.
- Mina Nagoshi (夏越 美奈, Nagoshi Mina) is Haruto's high school classmate in Tokyo. Learning that Mina has tickets for an event at Yuzuki's school, Haruto accompanies her which causes her to believe they are on a date.^{Ch. 85} She reappears as a member of the college circle that Haruto joins.^{Ch. 180} There, she comes to believe she and Haruto are a couple again;^{Ch. 181} she later ends this supposed relationship to be with another man.^{Ch. 243} She appears in Gonzo's anime and is voiced by Sayuri Yahagi.
- Kiyomi Asakura (浅倉 清美, Asakura Kiyomi) is Kyousuke Kazama's childhood friend.^{Ch. 95} She originally despises Yuzuki for her relationship with Kyousuke, and works with Haruto to try to split them apart. She confesses her love to Kyousuke before he undergoes his surgery.^{Ch. 99} She begins dating Takashi and the two marry when she becomes pregnant.^{Ch. 225} She appears in Gonzo's anime and is voiced by Aya Endo.
- Shiori Amaya (天谷 栞, Amaya Shiori) is a business student at Seijo University. She stages an incriminating situation in order to blackmail Haruto into taking class notes for her.^{Ch. 112} Despite her family's opposition, she decides to pursue her dream as a manga artist.^{Ch. 113} She later appears as a supporting character in Hitman.
- Miyu Hoshina (保科 美夕, Hoshina Miyu) is Haruto's neighbor during his university years. She does not have friends at the university and, because she has gone to an all-girls high school, has androphobia.^{Ch. 148} After interacting with Haruto and Yuzuki, she becomes more social and studies abroad.^{Ch. 222}
- Chisa Miyanaga (宮永 知沙, Miyanaga Chisa) is Yuzuki's student from her cram school job. She develops a crush on Haruto and decides to pursue him.^{Ch. 177} When she becomes a high school student, she moves into Miyu's old apartment.^{Ch. 230}

== Publication and conception ==
Written and illustrated by Kōji Seo, A Town Where You Live was serialized in Kodansha's shōnen manga magazine Weekly Shōnen Magazine from May 28, 2008, to February 12, 2014. Seo stated he wanted to create a love story set in his hometown as the inspiration to the series and that some of his characters were inspired by his friends. Kouji Seo created a guide book titled A Town Where You Live Official Guidebook Love Navi: Love Navigation! (Note: 君のいる町 公式ガイドブック 恋なび Love Navigation!, Kimi no Iru Machi Kōshiki Gaido Bukku Koi Nabi Love Navigation!) which was released on August 16, 2013. A special volume, titled A Town Where You Live Delusional Episode 200 Special Edition, (Note: 君のいる町 妄想200話 SPECIAL EDITION, Kimi no Iru Machi Mōsō 200-wa SPECIAL EDITION) collecting nine previously released alternative chapters 200 (also serving as alternative endings with other heroines) was released on October 17, 2018. Six of those chapters were previously released with limited editions of the Gonzo anime volumes, two with limited editions of manga volumes 26 and 27, and one as a bonus released by Amuse Soft Entertainment. A free epilogue chapter was released online on April 1, 2020.

On October 30, 2013, Crunchyroll Manga was launched and included A Town Where You Live in its library with English translation by Abby Lehrke; the series has also been published in languages such as French and Chinese.

== Anime adaptations ==
=== Tatsunoko Production ===
A Town Where You Live: Twilight Intersection (君のいる町～黄昏交差点～, Kimi no Iru Machi Tasogare Kōsaten) is a two episode original video animation series animated by Tatsunoko Production in collaboration with the city, Shōbara. Yasuhiro Yoshiura and Hiroshi Kobayashi were the directors with script by Momoko Murakami and music by Keiichi Oku. The series' theme song was Tasogare Kōsaten (黄昏交差点, lit. 'Twilight Intersection') by Erina Mano; the theme song was later released as a CD single by Hello! Project. The episodes were bundled with the limited edition manga volume 17 and 18; they were released on March 16 and June 15, 2012, respectively. The series covers Haruto Kirishima's class trip to Tokyo as he separates from his classmates to search for Yuzuki Eba.

=== Gonzo ===
A Town Where You Live was adapted into an anime television series animated by Gonzo. Shigeyasu Yamauchi was the director with script by Reiko Yoshida and music by Keiichi Oku. It was first announced in Weekly Shōnen Magazine, issue 15, 2013. To promote the show, a radio program consisting of the anime's voice cast was broadcast on Nippon Cultural Broadcasting between July 6 and July 27, 2013. The anime aired on TXN between July 13 and September 28, 2013. It was also broadcast on HOME and AT-X and was made available for streaming on networks such as Niconico and Bandai Channel. The series uses four theme songs: The opening theme is Sentimental Love (センチメンタルラブ, Senchimentaru Rabu) by Mimimememimi. The first ending theme is Kimi no Iru Machi (君のいる町, lit. "A Town Where You Live") which was used for the first six episodes while its alternate version, Answer Songs was used for the final episode; the song was done by Yoshimasa Hosoya. The remaining episodes' ending theme was Dear Friend by Daisuke Ono. Sentimental Love was released as a CD single by A-Sketch while Kimi no Iru Machi and Dear Friend were released by Universal Music Group. Right Stuf Inc.'s Nozomi Entertainment announced an English subtitled release for North America in July 2015. Each of the six limited edition DVD/Blu-ray volumes of the series included a bonus manga chapter that serves as an alternative chapter 200 and an alternative ending with other heroines.

Gonzo also animated two original video animation episodes which are bundled with the limited editions of manga volume 26 and 27. Gonzo's anime adaptation resulted in a drama CD and an image song release.

==== Episodes ====
No.	Title	Original release date
1	"Chase" "Oikakete" (Japanese: 追いかけて)	July 13, 2013
2	"When Cherry Blossoms Bloom" "Sakura no Sakukoro" (Japanese: 桜の咲く頃)	July 20, 2013
3	"Suddenly, Batanchu" "Totsuzen, Batanchū" (Japanese: 突然、バタンチュー)	July 27, 2013
4	"Greetings" "Aisatsu" (Japanese: あいさつ)	August 3, 2013
5	"Declaration of War" "Sensen Fukoku" (Japanese: 宣戦布告。)	August 10, 2013
6	"My True Feelings" "Ore no Honshin" (Japanese: オレの本心。)	August 17, 2013
7	"Wish" "Negai" (Japanese: ねがい。)	August 24, 2013
8	"On the Evening of the Reunion" "Saikai no Yoru ni" (Japanese: 再会の夜に)	August 31, 2013
9	"Is it a Date" "Dēto suru ka" (Japanese: デートするか。)	September 7, 2013
10	"Beautiful Flower" "Kireina Hana" (Japanese: キレイな花)	September 14, 2013
11	"Confession" "Kokuhaku" (Japanese: 告白。)	September 21, 2013
12	"A Town Where You Live" "Kimi no Iru Machi" (Japanese: 君のいる町)	September 28, 2013

== Reception ==
In Japan, A Town Where You Live manga volumes frequently appeared on weekly sales charts during their week of release. Jason Thompson praised A Town Where You Live's serious, mature tone and wrote that the audiences will either like the series for its realism or criticize it as slow and mundane. Manga-News praised the series' introduction for being more realistic than the author's previous work, Suzuka, and the plot which was described as eventful. In later volumes, Manga-News criticized the plot for being predictable, encompassing cliché aspects of the genre, and for dragging its story. They also panned the characters' behavior, calling it implausible and inconsistent. Manga-News returned to positive reviews during the volumes involving Kyousuke Kazama; they praised the story arc for introducing a new setting, for breaking away from the usual classicism, and for surprising the readers for the first time in the series. Following this, Manga-News returned to negative reviews, echoing their previous points. AnimeLand had similar reactions. Initially, they were positive, praising the realistic protagonist, but further reviews repeated Manga-News' criticisms.

== Works cited ==
- "Ch." is shortened form for chapter and refers to a chapter number of the A Town Where You Live manga.
