= Princess Lucia =

Manga by Kōji Seo

- The cover of the first manga volume.

プリンセスルシア (Purinsesu Rushia)
- Genre: Romantic comedy
- Manga
- Written by: Kōji Seo
- Published by: Mag Garden
- English publisher: NA: Digital Manga
- Magazine: Monthly Comic Blade (2009 – July 2014); Monthly Comic Garden (September 2014 – October 2015)
- Original run: 30 March 2009 – 5 October 2015
- Volumes: 5

Princess Lucia (プリンセスルシア, Purinsesu Rushia) is a Japanese manga series written and illustrated by Kōji Seo. The series first volume was digitally released in North America by Digital Manga.

== Plot ==
Princess Lucia of the demon realm decides that she must have a child with Yuta, a normal human student, as the child born from their union would possess great power. However, two angels, Rie and Eru, are intent on keeping her from achieving her goal.

== Characters ==
The series has four main characters:

- Princess Lucia (ルシア, Rushia)

A princess from the demon realm who believes that if she were to have a child with Yuta it would be amazingly powerful due to his date of birth.

- Yuta Koizumi (小泉 ユタ, Koizumi Yuta)

A normal student who happened to be born on 6 June at 6:06:06 during the sixth year of the Heisei period (1994).

- Rie (春日部 リエ, Kasukabe Rie) and Eru (美花本 エル, Mikamoto Eru)

Two angels dedicated to keeping Lucia from having a child with Yuta.

== Release ==
Kōji Seo began the series as a one-shot in Mag Garden's Monthly Comic Blade in the September 2008 issue, before launching it as a bi-monthly serialized title in the magazine's March 2009 issue. The series went on hiatus before resuming on 30 May 2014. When the Comic Blade magazine ceased print publication on 30 July 2014, the series was moved to Mag Garden's new Monthly Comic Garden magazine starting on 1 September 2014, while also continuing publication on Comic Blade's website. The series concluded on 5 October 2015.

Seo released an artbook for the series, Princess Memories (瀬尾公治画集 -PRINCESS MEMORIES-), on 9 November 2012 (ISBN 978-4800000392).

In November 2013, Digital Manga announced that they had licensed the first three volumes of the series for publication in North America under their Project-H imprint. The publisher regularly licenses series on a volume-by-volume basis. It released the first volume digitally on 15 December 2014. The print volumes were originally scheduled to be released in March, June, and September 2015, respectively. The first volume was later rescheduled to January 2016, but missed that window also. In May 2016, Digital Manga launched PeCChi, a new imprint that focused on non-pornographic adult titles, and announced that several of its former Project-H titles would be transferring to the new imprint, starting with Princess Lucia, but this did not happen.

=== Volumes ===
The series was collected into five tankōbon volumes between 2009 and 2015.

| No. | Original release date | Original ISBN | English release date | English ISBN |
|---|---|---|---|---|
| 1 | 17 September 2009 | 978-4-86127-657-6 | 15 December 2014 (digital); 12 January 2016 (print, cancelled) | 978-1-62459-192-1; 978-1-62459-191-4 |
| 2 | 17 January 2011 | 978-4-86127-806-8 | 24 June 2015 (print, cancelled) | 978-1-62459-193-8 |
| 3 | 10 May 2012 | 978-4-86127-996-6 | 30 September 2015 (print, cancelled) | 978-1-62459-195-2 |
| 4 | 17 March 2014 | 978-4-8000-0278-5 | — | — |
| 5 | 17 December 2015 | 978-4-8000-0527-4 | — | — |
