= Fuuka (manga) =

Japanese manga and anime series

- Cover of the first manga volume, featuring Fuuka Akitsuki

風夏 (Fūka)
- Genre: Musical, romantic drama
- Manga
- Written by: Kōji Seo
- Published by: Kodansha
- English publisher: NA: Kodansha USA
- Imprint: Shōnen Magazine Comics
- Magazine: Weekly Shōnen Magazine
- Original run: 12 February 2014 – 4 April 2018
- Volumes: 20 + special
- Anime television series
- Directed by: Keizō Kusakawa
- Produced by: Ikuno Iida; Jun Fukuda; Tetsuya Endo; Gouta Aijima; Toshio Iizuka; Masao Fukuda; Toshihiro Maeda; Yoko Tanaka; Hiroshi Endo
- Written by: Aoi Akashiro; Touko Machida
- Music by: Iga Takuro; West Ground
- Studio: Diomedéa
- Licensed by: Crunchyroll (Note: Formerly branded as "Funimation" in North America. It is also licensed in the United Kingdom by Crunchyroll UK and Ireland and in Australia via Madman Anime.)
- Original network: Wowow, Tokyo MX, MBS, BS11, HTV
- Original run: 6 January 2017 – 24 March 2017
- Episodes: 12
- icon

Fuuka (Japanese: 風夏, Hepburn: Fūka) is a Japanese manga written and illustrated by Kōji Seo. It was serialized in Kodansha's Weekly Shōnen Magazine from February 2014 to April 2018, with its chapters collected in twenty tankōbon volumes. It is a sequel to Seo's previous manga series Suzuka. It was published online in English by Crunchyroll.

A 12-episode anime television adaptation produced by Diomedéa aired from January to March 2017.

== Plot ==
Fuuka is a sequel to the 2004 manga Suzuka. The story follows Yuu Haruna, a loner and an avid Twitter user who made a promise with his childhood friend Koyuki Hinashi to start a band. One night, on his way to buy dinner, he stops to take a photo to upload to Twitter. A strange high school girl named Fuuka Akitsuki accidentally bumps into him and mistakenly believes that Yuu is trying to take a photo of her panties, which causes her to smash his phone. Fuuka leaves behind a CD, which Yuu returns the following day. Appreciating Yuu's personality, Fuuka starts a relationship with him, but this is complicated when Koyuki, now a popular idol, contacts Yuu on Twitter and invites him to attend her concert. Fuuka and Yuu begin their music careers when they form a new band called The Fallen Moon together with classmates Makoto, Kazuya, and Sara. Meanwhile, Fuuka's feelings towards Yuu continue to grow, while Koyuki also begins to get closer to him.

== Media ==
=== Manga ===
Written and illustrated by Koji Seo, Fuuka was serialized in Kodansha's shōnen manga magazine Weekly Shōnen Magazine from 12 February 2014 to 4 April 2018. Its 195 individual chapters were compiled into twenty tankōbon volumes, released from 16 May 2014 to 17 April 2018. A Fuuka Special Edition volume was published on 13 April 2018 and contains alternative endings for other heroines.

The manga was simul-published online in English by Crunchyroll starting in 2014 and Kodansha USA starting in 2016. It was released in digital volumes by Kodansha USA from 2015 to 2019.

=== Anime ===
An anime television series adaptation produced by Diomedéa aired from 6 January to 24 March 2017. The series' opening theme is "Climbers' High!" by Manami Numakura who voices Tama, vocalist of the band Hedgehogs. The series' ending theme is "Watashi no Sekai" by Megumi Nakajima. For episode 6, the ending theme is "Yukihanabi" (雪花火) by Saori Hayami. The anime ran for 12 episodes and was released across six BD/DVD volumes.

Crunchyroll streamed the series, with Funimation releasing a simuldub for the series. Songs in the anime are performed by My First Story's guitarist SHO, Ellegarden's drummer Hirotaka Takahashi, The Bonez's bassist T$UYO$HI and Takuro Iga, the series' music composer, playing the keyboard.

==== Episode list ====
No.	Official English title (Note: All English titles are taken from Crunchyroll & Funimation.) Original Japanese title	Original release date
1	"Fuuka!"; Transliteration: "Fūka!" (Japanese: 風夏!)	6 January 2017
Yuu Haruna is an introverted teenager living in Tokyo with his three sisters and is also a constant user of Twitter. One day, he runs into a mysterious girl named Fuuka Akitsuki and a misunderstanding leads to her smashing his phone and slapping him. Yuu learns that the new school he is transferring to is also attended by Fuuka, who he runs into on the school rooftop. Another misunderstanding leads to her throwing Yuu's repair phone over the edge, but she helps him find it the next day as a favor for Yuu returning to her a CD she dropped during their first encounter. Fuuka sees Yuu holding spare movie tickets given to him by his sister for a film featuring a song by Koyuki Hinashi, whom Fuuka is a big fan of. They go out to see the movie together and get in line afterwards for phone charms that are reserved for couples. After his day out with Fuuka, a familiar person contacts Yuu online.
2	"Take Flight!"; Transliteration: "Habatake!" (Japanese: はばたけ!)	6 January 2017
Fuuka talks with her parents Suzuka and Yamato, both former athletes, about not being interested in joining the track team yet wanting to find something to be passionate about. One day, Yuu sees Fuuka overlooking the school courtyard while quietly crying, and he sees that his classmate Makoto is down there. Yuu assumes that Fuuka has feelings for Makoto, but learns later that Makoto isn't into girls and that Fuuka was crying because of an emotional song by Koyuki that she was listening to. The person contacting Yuu turns out to be Koyuki, who is a childhood friend. Koyuki invites Yuu to her upcoming concert, which he attends with Fuuka. Afterwards, after listening to Fuuka sing, Yuu suggests that she takes up music. Fuuka decides to start a band with Yuu and Makoto.
3	"Triangle!"; Transliteration: "Toraianguru!" (Japanese: トライアングル!)	13 January 2017
At the suggestion of Ms Tomomi, Yuu, Fuuka, and Makoto head to the seaside to take up a part-time job at a beach house in order to earn some money for instruments. While at the beach house, Yuu's timid and shy nature leads to him having a hard time serving customers and also creates tension with Yahagi, the beach house owner. Yuu contemplates on going home, but with encouragement from Fuuka, he improves his performance at work and grows some confidence. Afterwards while out swimming, Fuuka and Yuu get washed out too far from shore and Yuu passes out, but once back on the beach he wakes up again, to the relief of Fuuka, who was giving him CPR. Later in the evening, Koyuki contacts Yuu and they meet up. Fuuka also shows up while looking for Yuu and sees them together, to her surprise.
4	"Live!"; Transliteration: "Raibu!" (Japanese: ライブ!)	20 January 2017
Upon seeing Yuu and Koyuki together, Fuuka runs off and returns to the beach house. The next morning, Yuu tries to explain to Fuuka that he and Koyuki are just friends, but Fuuka gets mad that he never told her this. Tomomi, Hisashi, and Kazuya show up at the beach house to pay everyone a visit, and it is soon discovered that Tomomi, Hisashi, and Yahagi are former members of the popular band Hedgehogs. The former band members note that the Hedgehogs are on hiatus because bassist Nico and vocalist Tama took off and disappeared. Kazuya, having always wanted Fuuka to join the track team, voices his skepticism on whether Fuuka could really pursue music. Tomomi decides to hold a test performance with Fuuka on vocals and Yuu on bass. Fuuka and Yuu apologize to each other over the tension from Yuu's meetup with Koyuki. During the performance, Fuuka impresses everyone with her singing, and Kazuya gets recruited into the band.
5	"One of Us!"; Transliteration: "Nakama!" (Japanese: 仲間!)	27 January 2017
Koyuki pays a visit to Yuu's home and becomes emotional when he suggests he also has feelings for her. At school, the band members encounter Sara, a guitarist and the younger sister of Hisashi who doesn't get along with the past bands she's been in. Despite this, Fuuka asks Sara to join her band when they are practicing at the music studio, which Sara agrees to. The band discovers during practice that they have much to improve on in terms of their instrument skills. Later, the band has a meal together and after everyone else departs, Yuu and Sara discover that unbeknownst to each other they are already long time friends on Twitter, and Sara immediately warms to Yuu, a change from her initial cold demeanor towards him. After a period of practice, the band meets up at Kazuya's garage and plays a song with much improved skill. Fuuka decides that the band will perform in the upcoming school festival.
6	"Koyuki Hinashi"; Transliteration: "Hinashi Koyuki" (Japanese: 氷無小雪)	3 February 2017
Koyuki reflects on her childhood and her past friendship with Yuu. They were both close friends as children and were fans of the Hedgehogs, nicknaming each other "Nico" and "Tama" after the band members. Koyuki's parents often argued and eventually decided to split, and Koyuki had to move away with her mother, much to her sadness in being forced to be separated from Yuu. In the present day, Koyuki visits Yuu to invite him to her Christmas concert, and they both renew their childhood promise to perform music together. Koyuki becomes dismayed when Yuu mentions his school band with Fuuka, and that he was glad just to be friends with her. On her way home, Koyuki runs into Fuuka after having dirty water splashed on her from a passing truck. While at the public bath together, Koyuki laments to Fuuka about her unrequited love, and tells her that this is where her music stems from. Upon hearing this, Fuuka says that she will support Koyuki in getting her love realized. After the bath, Koyuki leaves with renewed confidence in getting her feelings across to Yuu. Elsewhere in a coffee shop, a passerby who secretly photographed Yuu and Koyuki together shares his picture with a friend.
7	"Blown Up!"; Transliteration: "Dai enjō!" (Japanese: 大炎上!)	10 February 2017
The school bandmates continue to rehearse for the upcoming festival. The picture of Yuu and Koyuki gets uploaded online and spreads rapidly, with rumors and gossip running rampant. Koyuki's agency denies that she is in the picture and refuses further comments, while Yuu gets mobbed by curious classmates at school. Fuuka is irritated but suggests that they stay focused on the school festival performance. Despite the advice of her manager, Koyuki admits on a TV program that she was in the picture, and that Yuu is her unrequited love, who is the subject of her music. The idea of Yuu not returning Koyuki's feelings creates widespread hostility towards him from her fans, and there are threats that they will ruin the band's school festival performance. Regardless of this, the bandmates commit to the concert and prepare themselves for it. On the day of the performance, an angry and hostile crowd fills the school's indoor stadium. The band heads out onto the stage.
8	"Top!"; Transliteration: "Toppu!" (Japanese: トップ!)	17 February 2017
Despite the threats and jeers from the crowd, the band prepares to play on stage. Somebody throws a glass bottle at Yuu, which damages his bass. Yuu's sister Hibiki intervenes but is harassed, while Koyuki, who is also secretly attending, reveals herself to the crowd to urge them to stop, but ends up getting cut off and surrounded. Yuu gets his cut from the bottle bandaged and borrows Nico's bass from Yahagi, and the band begins to play. Their performance captivates the crowd and the audience becomes supportive, ending the hostility. Fuuka invites Koyuki onto the stage and they perform a song together, with Koyuki afterwards urging the crowd to stop harassing Yuu while apologizing for the situation. The audience is supportive and understanding. Afterwards, the band celebrates a successful performance at a diner and decides to name themselves The Fallen Moon. Yuu tries to contact Koyuki but she decides not to talk to him to avoid another dangerous situation. She also begins having trouble singing due to stress and overwork, so it is announced publicly that she is going on hiatus and is also cancelling her Christmas concert. Concerned, Yuu tracks Koyuki down and comforts her.
9	"Date!"; Transliteration: "Dēto!" (Japanese: デート!)	24 February 2017
Yuu and Koyuki spend part of the day together around town, and Yuu returns to practice with the band afterwards. Hisashi has organized an opportunity for the band to perform at a live music club. For that, Fuuka decides that she wants to write the band's first original song, but while doing so, her growing feelings towards Yuu begin to gnaw at her, which she feels more and more whenever she spots Yuu talking with Koyuki or spending time with her. Music producer Mogami meets with Fuuka to offer her a professional solo career as a singer, but she declines due to her desire to stay with the band.
10	"Fate!"; Transliteration: "Unmei!" (Japanese: 運命)	10 March 2017
While writing the song, Fuuka continues to contemplate her feelings for Yuu, realizing that she loves him. She finishes the song, and the bandmates prepare for their performance at the music club. Meanwhile, Nico and Tama finally return after several years of disappearance. While heading to the music club, Fuuka narrowly avoids being hit by a truck while trying to retrieve her phone charm when she drops it onto a crosswalk. At the club, The Fallen Moon holds their performance, including their new original song, "For You", to an enthusiastic audience, which includes Koyuki and the Hedgehogs members. After the performance, Fuuka shocks her bandmates by announcing that she would be leaving The Fallen Moon to pursue a solo career.
11	"Band!"; Transliteration: "Bando!" (Japanese: バンド)	17 March 2017
With Fuuka now gone, the rest of the bandmates decide to disband The Fallen Moon. They each start to go down their own paths, with Makoto returning to his family, Kazuya taking up track again, and Sara joining a new band. Koyuki visits Yuu at his home and expresses her desire for the two of them to be together, suggesting that Yuu could still pursue music without the band with her by his side, but Yuu ultimately rejects her. Unwilling to see The Fallen Moon come to an end like this, Yuu writes a new song and delivers a CD to each of the former members, asking them to return to the band. Although initially unwilling, each member eventually decides to return and they begin practicing again in anticipation that Fuuka would also return. Yuu stops by Fuuka's home but she avoids him.
12	"Fair Wind"	24 March 2017
The Fallen Moon decides to accept another offer by the music club to perform again, although Fuuka still hasn't rejoined the band yet. However, Yuu commits to getting Fuuka back before then. Koyuki meets with Fuuka and urges her to realize her feelings for Yuu. On the day of the performance, Yuu goes searching for Fuuka and finds her on the school roof. They confess their love for each and return together to the music club. The Fallen Moon, now reunited, successfully holds their performance and debuts their new song, "Fair Wind". As the band continues on their musical career together, the Hedgehogs also return from hiatus and begin performing again, with Koyuki also starting a new band of her own called Rabbitz. Yuu and Fuuka go to pray at a shrine, afterwards promising always to be together.

=== Music ===
A soundtrack album titled Fuuka Sound Collection was released on 15 March 2017, containing all insert songs and soundtracks from the anime.

In Chapter 189 of the manga, "Hoshi no Furu Machi"'s lyrics from the anime were used, marking the first time the manga took elements from the anime.

To commemorate the end of the manga, Seo wrote the song "Wings of Light", performed by Lynn, who voiced Fuuka in the anime adaptation.

== Sales ==
Volume 1 reached the 26th place on the weekly Oricon manga charts and, as of 25 May 2014, had sold 64,879 copies; volume 2 reached the 18th place on the chart and, as of 27 July 2014, had sold 73,193 copies; volume 3 reached the 28th place and, as of 26 October 2014, had sold 70,638 copies; volume 4 reached the 20th place and, as of 21 December 2014, had sold 51,164 copies; volume 5 reached the 12th place and, as of 22 February 2015, had sold 62,771 copies; volume 6 reached the 14th place and, as of 24 May 2015, had sold 69,659 copies; volume 7 reached the 17th place and, as of 26 July 2015, had sold 66,456 copies; volume 8 reached the 25th place and, as of 25 October 2015 had sold 61,372 copies; volume 9 reached the 25th place and, as of 20 December 2015, had sold 36,105 copies.
