= The Café Terrace and Its Goddesses =

Japanese manga series by Kōji Seo

- First tankōbon volume cover

女神のカフェテラス (Megami no Kafe Terasu)
- Genre: Harem; Romantic comedy
- Manga
- Written by: Kōji Seo
- Published by: Kodansha
- English publisher: NA: Kodansha USA (digital)
- Imprint: Shōnen Magazine Comics
- Magazine: Weekly Shōnen Magazine
- Original run: February 17, 2021 – November 5, 2025
- Volumes: 22
- Anime television series
- Directed by: Satoshi Kuwabara
- Produced by: Noriyuki Akita; Hiroyuki Aoi; Sumio Udagawa; Hiroaki Yamazaki; Masazumi Katou (S1); Hirokazu Wakabayashi (S2); Kim Hongil (S2)
- Written by: Keiichirō Ōchi
- Music by: Shu Kanematsu; Miki Sakurai; Kanade Sakuma (S2); Kaho Sawada (S2); Tsugumi Tanaka (S2); Misaki Tsuchida (S2)
- Studio: Tezuka Productions
- Licensed by: Crunchyroll
- Original network: JNN (MBS, TBS)
- Original run: April 8, 2023 – September 20, 2024
- Episodes: 24
- icon

The Café Terrace and Its Goddesses (Note: The English subname of the original Japanese manga version is Goddess Café Terrace) (Japanese: 女神のカフェテラス, Hepburn: Megami no Kafe Terasu) is a Japanese manga series written and illustrated by Kōji Seo. It was serialized in Kodansha's Weekly Shōnen Magazine from February 2021 to November 2025, and was compiled into 22 tankōbon volumes. An anime television series adaptation produced by Tezuka Productions aired from April to June 2023. A second season aired from July to September 2024.

== Plot ==
The series takes place in Miura, Kanagawa, and follows Hayato Kasukabe, an orphan who had moved to Tokyo for high school. After passing the exams for the University of Tokyo, he returns to Miura after being notified of the death of his grandmother, with the intention to close her struggling café, Cafe Terrace Familia. There, he discovers five women who had been working for the café, as well as living under his grandmother's care. After seeing their struggles and learning about their bond with his grandmother, he decides to reopen the café for business.

== Characters ==
Hayato Kasukabe (粕壁 隼, Kasukabe Hayato)
Voiced by: Masaaki Mizunaka
The 18-year-old protagonist. (Note: Hayato was originally said to be 19 in the serialized version, but his age was changed to 18 in the volume version.) He was orphaned at three years old after his parents died in an accident, and raised by his grandmother, Sachiko Kasukabe. He leaves for Tokyo to study, following an argument with Sachiko. After her death, he decides to come home, initially to close down the café, but later on decides to keep it open. He bears a striking resemblance to his late grandfather, Masahiro.
Ouka Makuzawa (幕澤 桜花, Makuzawa Ōka)
Voiced by: Akari Kitō (PV), Ruriko Aoki (anime)
A 19-year-old part-timer at Familia, who is studying at a fashion school. She has a tsundere personality. She has a twin sister named Kikka. She goes overseas to France in order to study fashion, but returns to Familia after a month, having been let go from her work-study.
Ami Tsuruga (鶴河 秋水, Tsuruga Ami)
Voiced by: Akari Kitō (PV), Sayumi Suzushiro (anime)
A 17-year-old part-timer at Familia and a childish high school student, she is skilled in karate. A running gag in the series is her wearing masks to prank her co-workers with them and somehow performing moves from the game Street Fighter (especially both Shoryuken and Tatsumaki Senpukyaku). Being airheaded, she once dropped a dumbbell on Hayato's laptop and smartphone. On occasion, Hayato would call her "Tsuruga-nidouhei" ("Private Tsuruga").
Riho Tsukishima (月島 流星, Tsukishima Riho)
Voiced by: Akari Kitō (PV), Aya Yamane (anime)
A 20-year-old part-timer at Familia and a college student. She is the granddaughter of a famous Shōwa era actress, and used to be a popular child actress herself, until her parents' acrimonious divorce.
Shiragiku Ono (小野 白菊, Ono Shiragiku)
Voiced by: Akari Kitō (PV), Azumi Waki (anime)
A 20-year-old part-timer at Familia and Hayato's childhood friend. She is the daughter of a Michelin-star chef who had studied under Sachiko Kasukabe. A running gag is Shiragiku's penchant for doing lewd things when drunk, in addition to having a fetish for smells. She is nicknamed "Kiku-chan" by Riho.
Akane Hououji (鳳凰寺 紅葉, Hōōji Akane)
Voiced by: Akari Kitō (PV), Asami Seto (anime)
A 19-year-old part-timer at Familia, and the vocalist and guitarist of a band, Mussy Moustache Girls. She comes from a rich family who disapprove of her singing career. She is the heiress to the Hououji household. At the end of the series, she marries Hayato, although she allows the others to be close to him, giving him a harem.
Sachiko Kasukabe (粕壁 幸子, Kasukabe Sachiko)
Voiced by: Kazue Ikura
Hayato's grandmother, who took care of Hayato after he was orphaned. Her death before the start of the series is what brings Hayato back to Familia. She had worked as a waitress in the previous iteration of the Familia café under Masahiro.
Masahiro Kasukabe (粕壁 大洋, Kasukabe Masahiro)
Sachiko's husband, and Hayato's grandfather. His grandson resembles him. He was the previous owner of the Familia café and had passed away some time before Hayato's birth.
Kikka Makuzawa (幕澤 橘花, Makuzawa Kikka)
Voiced by: Sumire Uesaka
Ouka's younger twin sister. She is a Tokyo University student and was estranged from Ouka at the beginning of the series. In contrast to her sister, who was purple eyes, she has blue ones. She usually wears glasses.
Shigehisa Fuwa (不破茂久, Fuwa Shigehisa)
Voiced by: Nobuo Tobita
A former ambassador, Shigehisa is a debt collector who is the main antagonist of the series. He has a deep-seated grudge against the Kasukabe family. He does everything in his power (even invoking his ties with the police) to be a thorn in the side of Hayato and the Familia café, including creating a copycat rival of the café. He is deeply hated by everyone who knows him.
Hekiru Yoshino (吉野 碧流, Yoshino Hekiru)
Voiced by: Kana Hanazawa
Hekiru is a 19-year-old part-timer brought in to staff the copycat Terrace Café. She is also an aspiring author.
Moemi Sо̄ya (宗谷 萌美, Sōya Moemi)
Voiced by: Reina Ueda
Moemi is a third-year college student brought in to staff the copycat Terrace Cafe. Due to her familial roots (their family owns a top restaurant), she would eventually become the head chef of the reopened diner when Shigehisa fired them all unceremoniously. One of her behaviors includes turning into a different character when wearing a chef's hat, resembling that of Ryo Kurokiba from Shokugeki no Soma.
Ririka Chiyoda (千代田 莉々歌, Chiyoda Ririka)
Voiced by: Ayana Taketatsu
Ririka is a 19-year-old idol brought in to staff the copycat Terrace Cafe. When Shigehisa fired them and her agency fired her due to an incident, she became a YouTuber and helped reopen the café with help from Hayato. She considers Riho as her senpai.
Valentina Azuma (ヴァレンティーナ吾妻, Varentīna Azuma)
Voiced by: Yu Serizawa
Valentina is an 18-year-old traveler brought in to staff the copycat Terrace Café. After Shigehisa fired her and her co-waitresses, she later worked at the Chiyoda Diner.
Mao Takasaki (高崎 舞乙, Takasaki Mao)
Voiced by: Rie Takahashi
Mao is a 20-year-old part-timer brought in to staff the copycat Terrace Café. She is also an amateur model who works at the Chiyoda Diner. She tends to openly flirt with Hayato, much to the jealousy of the Familia girls.

== Media ==
=== Manga ===
The Café Terrace and Its Goddesses is written and illustrated by Kōji Seo. It was serialized in Kodansha's Weekly Shōnen Magazine from February 17, 2021, to November 5, 2025. The first tankōbon volume was released on May 17, 2021; as of January 16, 2026, the series has been compiled in 22 volumes. A special edition of the tenth volume was released to celebrate the character Akane Hououji topping the popularity poll, and is accompanied by a pamphlet titled "Akanebon", which features illustrations and bonus comics. On January 7, 2026, Seo announced that the series would continue with an irregular serialization at an undetermined date.

In September 2022, Kodansha USA announced that they licensed the series for an English digital release; the first volume was released on October 18, and the last on July 14, 2026.

==== Volumes ====
| No. | Original release date | Original ISBN | English release date | English ISBN |
|---|---|---|---|---|
| 1 | May 17, 2021 | 978-4-06-523407-5 | October 18, 2022 | 978-1-68-491465-4 |
1. Familia (ファミリア, Famiria); 2. Our Promise to Grandma (おばあちゃんとの約束, O Bāchanto no Yakusoku); 3. Pre-Open (プレオープン, Pure-Ōpun); 4. Making the Rounds (挨拶回り, Aisatsu Mawari); 5. Like Cats and Dogs (犬猿の仲, Ken'en no Naka); 6. The Eve of the Shop Opening (開店前夜, Kaiten Zen'ya); 7. Open for Business! (開店(オープン)！, Ōpun!)
| 2 | July 16, 2021 | 978-4-06-524008-3 | November 15, 2022 | 978-1-68-491544-6 |
8. I Want to Protect It (絶対に守りたい, Zettai ni Mamoritai); 9. New Menu! (新メニュー, Shin Menyū); 10. Cherry Blossom Festival! (桜まつり!, Sakura Matsuri!); 11. Mark Zero! (零式!, Reishiki!); 12. Day Off (定休日, Teikyūbi); 13. Unchanging Daily Life (変わらない日常, Kawaranai Nichijō); 14. Two Months! (2か月!, Ni Kagetsu!); 15. Sandwich Wars! (サンドイッチ戦争!, Sandoitchi Sensō!); 16. I Want to Get Stronger (強くなりたい, Tsuyokunaritai); 17. Akane's Situation (紅葉(あかね)の事情, Akane no Jijō)
| 3 | September 17, 2021 | 978-4-06-524832-4 | December 20, 2022 | 978-1-68-491598-9 |
18. A Date and a Motive (デートと、本音, Dēto to, Hon'ne); 19. My Year's Work (アタシの1年, Atashi no Ichinen); 20. The Rain Stops (雨、上がる, Ame, Agaru); 21. The Start of Summer (夏の始まり, Natsu no Hajimari); 22. Beach Hut! (海の家!, Umi no Ie!); 23. The Height of Summer (夏本番!, Natsu Honban!); 24. A Maiden's Heart and the Summer Sky (女心と夏の空, On'nagokoro to ka no Sora); 25. Riho and Her Past (流星(りほ)と、その過去, Riho to, Sono Kako); 26. Acting and Reality (演技と、本音, Engi to, Hon'ne); 27. The Future and the Past (未来と、過去と, Mirai to, Kako to)
| 4 | December 17, 2021 | 978-4-06-526289-4 | January 17, 2023 | 978-1-68-491644-3 |
28. Swimming in the Sea! (海水浴!, Kaisuiyoku!); 29. Firework Display (花火大会, Hanabi Taikai); 30. Obon Holidays! (お盆休み！, Obon Yasumi!); 31. Surprise Attack (予期せぬ口撃(こうげき), Yokisenu Kōgeki); 32. The Humble Cherry Blossom, and the Sky Above (桜の花、上の空, Sakura no Hana, Uwa no Sora); 33. Ouka and Kikka (桜花と橘花, Ōka to Kikka); 34. To the Hero Show! (いざ、ヒーローショーへ！, Iza, Hīrō Shō e!); 35. The Unknown (わからないこと, Wakaranai Koto); 36. A Maiden's Heart and the End of Summer (夏の終わりと乙女心, Natsu no Owari to Otome Kokoro); 37. Swaying in the Hot Water (湯の中、揺らめく, Yu no Naka, Yurameku)
| 5 | March 17, 2022 | 978-4-06-527290-9 | February 17, 2023 | 978-1-68-491704-4 |
38. Just the Two of Us, On the Way Home (帰(かえ)り道(みち)、二(ふた)人(り)きり, Kaerimichi, Futarikiri); 39. Sparks of Love (恋の火花, Koi no Hibana); 40. New Menu, Again! (新メニュー、再び！, Shin Menyū, Futatabi!); 41. When They First Met (二つの出会い, Futatsu no Deai); 42. A Longing, and A Reason for Living (憧れと生き甲斐, Akogare to Ikigai); 43. Picnic! (ピクニック！, Pikunikku!); 44. The Dark Shadow Over Familia (ファミリアに黒い影, Famiria ni Kuroi Kage); 45. Public Decency Officer Ouka (風紀委員･桜花, Jajjimento Ōka); 46. Another Me (もう一人の私, Mōhitori no Watashi); 47. The Reason for The Tears (涙の理由(わけ)は, Namida no Wake wa)
| 6 | June 17, 2022 | 978-4-06-528182-6 | March 21, 2023 | 978-1-68-491850-8 |
48. Father Meets Manager (父と店長, Chichi to Tenchō); 49. A Bolt From the Blue (青天の霹靂, Seiten no Hekireki); 50. Enemy Sighted! (新メニュー、再び！, Shin Menyū, Futatabi!); 51. What I Can Really Do (本当の実力, Hontō no Jitsuryoku); 52. A Single Counterattack (反撃の一手, Hangeki no Itte); 53. Riho and Ririka (流星と莉々歌, Ryūsei to Rei Uta); 54. The Future of the Five (5人の行き先, 5-Ri no Ikisaki); 55. One Guy and Eleven Girls Under One Roof (男女11人共同生活, Danjo 11-ri Kyōdō Seikatsu); 56. Ririka's Request (莉々歌の相談, Rei Uta no Sōdan); 57. A Soft-Hearted Person (お人好し, Ohitoyoshi)
| 7 | September 16, 2022 | 978-4-06-528662-3 | April 18, 2023 | 978-1-68-491894-2 |
58. The Couple's Ticket (ペアチケット, Pea Chiketto); 59. Hot Spring Trip! (温泉旅行！, Onsen Ryokō!); 60. An Unexpected Visitor (突然の来客, Totsuzen no Raikyaku); 61. A Request Within A Dream (夢に頼まれて, Yume ni Tanoma Rete); 62. The End of a Scary Dream (怖い夢の終わり, Kowai Yume no Owari); 63. Underneath a Full Moon (満月の下で, Mangetsu no Shita de); 64. A Sleepless Night (眠らせない夜, Nemurasenai Yoru); 65. The End of the Trip (旅の終わりに, Tabi no Owari ni); 66. When Ten Girls Get Together... (女10人集まれば, On'na 10-ri Atsumareba); 67. Choosing a Gift (プレゼント選び, Purezento Erabi)
| 8 | November 17, 2022 | 978-4-06-529633-2 | June 20, 2023 | 978-1-68-491971-0 |
68. I'm Not Joking (冗談なんかじゃない, Jōdan Nanka Janai); 69. Two Questions (問われた二択, Towa Reta Ni-taku); 70. Work Offer! (出演オファー!, Shutsuen Ofā!); 71. A Reunion and an Update (再会と報せ, Saikai to Shirase); 72. Riho's Choice (流星の選択, Ryūsei no Sentaku); 73. Mother and Daughter (母と娘, Hahatoko); 74. Familia 1961 (ファミリア1961, Famiria 1961); 75. Getting Ready For Christmas (クリスマスに備えて, Kurisumasu ni Sonaete); 76. Celebrating Together (みんなで楽しく, Min'na de Tanoshiku); 77. Christmas Party! (クリスマスパーティ！, Kurisuma Supāti!)
| 9 | February 17, 2023 | 978-4-06-530576-8 | August 15, 2023 | 979-8-88-933099-8 |
78. After the Kiss (キスの行方は, Kisu no Yukue wa); 79. The Familia Kiss Trial (ファミリアキス裁判, Famiriakisu Saiban); 80. The Perfect Setting (理想のシチュエーション, Risō no Shichuēshon); 81. Thinking, Feeling, Kissing (キスとスキと考えごと, Kisu to Suki to Kangaegoto); 82. New Year's Cleaning! (大掃除！, Daisōji!); 83. New Year's Eve! (大晦日！, Ōmisoka!); 84. New Year's Shrine Visit! (初詣！, Hatsumōde!); 85. My First Time Drinking (はじめてのお酒, Hajimete no o Sake); 86. A Rival Arrives (ライバル襲来, Raibaru Shūrai); 87. The Strongest Person (一番の達人, Ichiban no Tatsujin)
| 10 | April 17, 2023 | 978-4-06-531253-7; 978-4-06-531254-4 (SE) | November 21, 2023 | 979-8-88-933275-6 |
88. One Last Pilaf (最後のピラフ, Saigo no Pirafu); 89. Departure Day (旅立ちの日, Tabidachi no Hi); 90. New Familia Order (ファミリア新体制, Famiria Shintaisei); 91. Ami's Uneasiness (秋水(あみ)の違和感, Ami no Iwakan); 92. Just the Two of Us at Familia (二人きりのファミリアで, Futarikiri no Famiria de); 93. I'm Greedy, After All (欲張りだから, Yokubari Dakara); 94. Someday's Valentine (いつかのバレンタイン, Itsuka no Barentain); 95. A Chiyoda Diner Emergency (千代田食堂の危機！, Chiyoda Shokudō no Kiki!); 96. Rei vs. The Five Assassins (零vs.5人の刺客, Rei vs. 5-Ri no Shikaku); 97. Preparing for a Role (役作りのために, Yaku-tsukuri no Tame ni)
| 11 | July 14, 2023 | 978-4-06-532185-0 | February 20, 2024 | 979-8-88-933379-1 |
98. A Man, A Woman, and the Castle of Love (男と女の恋の城, Otome no Koi no Shiro); 99. Cherry Blossoms and Blooming Feelings (想い、桜と共に, Omoi, Sakura to Tomoni); 100. I'm Back! (ただいま！, Tadaima!); 101. Some Long-Awaited Girls' Talk! (久々の女子会！, Hisabisa no Onagokai!); 102. One Year Anniversary! (1周年！, 1-Shūnen!); 103. To Shiragiku's House! (白菊の実家へ！, Shiragiku no Jikka e!); 104. Future of a First Love (初恋のゆくえ, Hatsu Koinoyukue); 105. Ami's Entrance Ceremony! (秋水(あみ)の入学式！, Ami no Nyūgakushiki!); 106. A Fateful Raffle (運命のクジ引き, Unmei no Kuji Hiki); 107. Travel Arrangements, Love Arrangements (旅の支度、恋の支度, Tabi no Shitaku, Koi no Shitaku)
| 12 | October 17, 2023 | 978-4-06-532897-2 | April 23, 2024 | 979-8-88-933447-7 |
108. Twelve Go to Miyakojima! (男女12人 宮古島旅行！, Danjo 12-ri Miyakojima Ryokō!); 109. Putting Romance and Respite Plans into Action (恋も旅行も計画的に, Koi mo Ryokō mo Keikaku-teki ni); 110. Flowers Blooming by the Beach at Night (海辺の夜に咲く花に, Umibe no Yorunisakuhana ni); 111. A Midnight Intruder (真夜中の潜入者, Mayonaka no Sen'nyū-sha); 112. Tour Guides (ツアーガイド, Tsuā Gaido); 113. The Real Favorite to Win (私の大本命◎, Watashi no Daihonmei); 114. Overflowing Feelings (零れる想い, Koboreru Omoi); 115. The Rules of Confession (告白のルール, Kokuhaku no Rūru); 116. Detective Hayato Kasukabe (名探偵・粕壁隼, Meitantei Kasukabe Hayabusa); 117. Dream, Subconscious, or Hallucination? (夢か現(うつつ)か幻か, Yume ka Utsutsu ka Maboroshi ka)
| 13 | December 15, 2023 | 978-4-06-533905-3 | June 25, 2024 | 979-8-88-933578-8 |
118. Get Fired, then Tsun, then Dere (クビ・ツン・デレ, Kubi・Tsun・Dere); 119. The Purpose of the Date (デートの目的, Dēto no Mokuteki); 120. Mother and Daughter, Take Two (シン・母と娘, Shin Hahatoko); 121. Sachiko's Happiness (幸子のしあわせ, Sachiko no Shiawase); 122. Childish Whims and Playing Nice (ワガママと綺麗事, Wagamama to Kireigoto); 123. The Five Girls' Oath (5人の誓い, 5-ri no Chikai); 124. The Karate Prodigy (天才空手家, Tensai Karateka); 125. Continue?; 126. Summer Draws Near (夏が来る, Natsugakuru); 127. The First Take (ザ・ファーストテイク, Za・Fāsuto Teiku)
| 14 | February 16, 2024 | 978-4-06-534566-5 | August 27, 2024 | 979-8-88-933701-0 |
128. The 16 Beat Method (16ビートの流儀, 16 Bīto no Ryūgi); 129. Don't Stop Filming! (カメラをとめるな, Kamera o Tomeru na); 130. A Single Clap of Thunder (霹靂、一閃, Hekireki, Issen); 131. The Eve of the Festival! (フェス前夜！, Fesu Zen'ya!); 132. A Secret Promise (秘密の約束, Himitsu no Yakusoku); 133. Opening Act (オープニングアクト, Ōpuningu Akuto); 134. My Standard; 135. Fiancée (許嫁, Iinazuke); 136. The Queen's Chef (女王の料理番, Joō no Ryōri-ban); 137. Strong Accents (訛り, Namari)
| 15 | May 16, 2024 | 978-4-06-535509-1 | November 26, 2024 | 979-8-89-478169-3 |
138. Jealousy and Conceit (嫉妬と自惚れ, Shitto to Unubore); 139. Fiancée vs. Childhood Friend (許嫁vs.幼なじみ, Iinazuke vs. Osananajimi); 140. Most Men... (大抵の男は。。。, Taitei no Otoko wa...); 141. Grandma's Flavors (ばぁちゃんの味, Bāchan no Aji); 142. Catch of the Day (本日の釣果, Honjitsu no Chōka); 143. Snow Falling in Summer (夏に降る雪, Natsu ni Furu Yuki); 144. The Lady-in-Waiting is Next in Line (侍女の事情, Jijo no Jijō); 145. Hos-pi-tal-i-ty; 146. Overlapping Images (重なる影, Kasanaru Kage); 147. Olivia's Prince (オリビアの王子様, Oribia no Ōji-sama)
| 16 | July 17, 2024 | 978-4-06-536166-5; 978-4-06-536132-0 (SE) | March 4, 2025 | 979-8-89-478422-9 |
148. The Manager's Unseen Side (見知らぬ、店長, Mishiranu, Tenchō); 149. Is This a Date? (これってデート？, Kore te Dēto?); 150. Even I... (私だって…, Watashi Datte…); 151. Ally of Justice (正義の味方, Seigi no Mikata); 152. Eri vs. Ami (恵里vs.秋水, Eri bāsasu Ami); 153. A Lonely Person (寂しがり屋だから, Samishigariya Dakara); 154. Mission: Proposal (プロポーズ大作戦, Puropōzu dai Sakusen); 155. Ami vs. Eri (秋水vs.恵里, Ami bāsasu Eri); 156. The Fight's Conclusion (決着, Ketchaku); 157. The Proposal (プロポーズ, Puropōzu)
| 17 | October 17, 2024 | 978-4-06-537127-5 | June 3, 2025 | 979-8-89-478552-3 |
158. Vows (誓いの言葉, Chikai no Kotoba); 159. Sachiko and Masahiro (幸子と大洋, Sachiko to Masahiro); 160. A New Life in Miura (三浦新生活, Miura Shin Seikatsu); 161. "From “Living Together” to..." (「同棲」から…, Dōsei Kara…); 162. "The Mysterious Sextuplets" (6つ子の影, Muttsugo no Kage); 163. "Hayato and Masahiro" (隼と大洋, Hayato to Masahiro); 164. "Tell Me How You Really Feel" (本心、教えてよ, Honshin, Oshieteyo); 165. "The Second Familia Trial" (第2回ファミリア裁判, Dai Ni Kai Famiria Saiban); 166. "The Perfect Balance of Tsun and Dere" (ツンとデレをいい感じに, Tsun to Dere o ī Kanji ni); 167. "Sisterly Differences" (姉妹のちがい, Shimai no Chigai)
| 18 | January 17, 2025 | 978-4-06-538073-4 | October 7, 2025 | 979-8-89-478727-5 |
168. "Sleepytime" (ネムクナ～ル, Nemukuna~ru); 169. "Assistant" (アシスタント); 170. "You Shall Not Pass" (誰も通ってはならぬ, Dare mo Tōtte wa Naranu); 171. "The Man Who Didn't Laugh" (笑わない男, Warawanai Otoko); 172. "Michie Obata" (オバタミチエ, Obatamichie); 173. "Could I Take Her Place?" (代わりになれる？, Kawari ni Nareru?); 174. "A Long Bath" (長風呂, Naga Furo); 175. "Riding on Someone's Coattails" (七光り, Nanahikari); 176. "The Day She Caught a Cold" (風邪をひいた日, Kaze o Hīta Hi); 177. "Unknown Actress" (無名の女優, Mumei no Joyū)
| 19 | April 16, 2025 | 978-4-06-539094-8 | January 6, 2026 | 979-8-89-478837-1 |
178. "Are You Okay With That...?" (それでいいの…？, Sore de Īno...?); 179. "Acting Advice and Alcohol Tolerance" (演技指導と飲酒量, Engi Shidō to Inshuryō); 180. "A Drunken Impulse..." (酔った勢いで･･･, Yottaikioi de...); 181. "A Beachside Portrait" (浜辺の肖像, Hamabe no Pōtoreito); 182. "Happy Ending"; 183. "The Joys of Visiting the 100 Yen Store" (100円ショップの幸せ, 100-En Shoppu no Shiawase); 184. "One Part of the Kasukabe Household" (粕壁家の一族, Kasukabe-ke no Ichizoku); 185. "I Won't Let You Go" (君を逃がさない, Kimi o Nigasanai); 186. "Family Bath Time is From Four o' Clock" (16時からは家族風呂, Ju-roku Ji Kara wa Kazoku Buro); 187. "A Game for Adults" (大人のゲーム, Otona no Gēmu)
| 20 | July 16, 2025 | 978-4-06-540004-3 | March 10, 2026 | 979-8-89-830030-2 |
188. "So I Wanted to, Too..." (だから私も…, Dakara Watashi mo…); 189. "Just Admit It!!" (ハイって言いなさい!!, Hai tte ii Nasai!!); 190. "Taking the Plunge, A Midwinter Love" (急降下、真冬の恋, Kyūkōka, Mafuyu no Koi); 191. "Sole Proprietors" (個人事業主, Kojin Jigyō Nushi); 192. "Return of Detective Hayato Kasukabe" (Re:名探偵・粕壁隼, Re: Mei Tantei Kasukabe Hayabusa); 193. "Hayato's Confession" (隼の告白, Hayabusa no Kokuhaku); 194. "Butt Detectives" (おしり探偵, Oshiri Tantei); 195. "Enduring Blossoms and Fallen Blossoms" (残る桜と散る桜, Nokoru Sakura to Chirusakura); 196. "Those Guided to This Place" (導かれし者たち, Michibikareshi Monotachi); 197. "The Words That Those Girls Said" (アイツらの言葉, Aitsura no Kotoba)
| 21 | October 17, 2025 | 978-4-06-541103-2 | May 19, 2026 | 979-8-89-830108-8 |
198. "Changing Seasons" (季節を越えて, Kisetsu o Koete); 199. "The Hekiru-Eyed Illusion" (碧眼の虚像 （バックラッシュ）, Hekigan no Kyozō (Bakkurasshu)); 200. "Actresses and Scandals" (女優とスキャンダル, Joyū to Sukyandaru); 201. "Infinite Loop" (無限ループ, Mugen Rūpu); 202. "Vanquishing the Demon" (悪鬼滅殺, Akki Messatsu); 203. "Memories and Promises" (思い出と約束, Omoide to Yakusoku); 204. "Insider Trading" (インサイダー取引, Insaidā Torihiki); 205. "Have You Forgotten Already?" (もう忘れたの？, Mō Wasureta no?); 206. "A Black Lump" (黒い塊, Kuroi Katamari); 207. "Wavering Memories" (揺れる想い, Yureru Omoi)
| 22 | January 16, 2026 | 978-4-06-542207-6 | July 14, 2026 | 979-8-89-830170-5 |
208. "Fuwa Attacks" (不破、襲来, Fuwa, Shūrai); 209. "Are You Really Okay With That?" (それでいいの？, Sorede ī no?); 210. "Flashing Before One’s Eyes" (走馬灯, Sōmatō); 211. "Familia Wars" (ファミリアウォーズ, Famiria Uōzu); 212. "The Power to Protect What Matters" (大切なものを守る力, Taisetsu na Mono o Mamoru Chikara); 213. "Familia Diplomacy" (ファミリア外交, Famiria Gaikō); 214. "On the Verge of Death" (今際の際, Imawa no Kiwa); 215. "The One I Like Is…" (オレが好きなのは…, Ore ga Sukina no wa…); 216. "Familia" (ファミリア, Famiria); 217. "Into the Legend..." (そして伝説へ…, Soshite Densetsu he...)

=== Anime ===
An anime television series adaptation was announced on September 8, 2022. It was produced by Tezuka Productions and directed by Satoshi Kuwabara, with scripts written by Keiichirō Ōchi, character designs handled by Masatsune Noguchi, and music composed by Shu Kanematsu and Miki Sakurai. The series aired from April 8 to June 24, 2023, on the Super Animeism programming block on all JNN affiliates, including MBS and TBS. (Note: MBS and TBS listed the series premiere on April 7, 2023, at 25:25, which is effectively April 8 at 1:25 a.m. JST.) The opening theme song is "Unmei Kyōdōtai!" (運命共同体) performed by NeRiAme, and the ending theme song is "Dramatic" (ドラマチック, Doramachikku) performed by Miki Satō. Crunchyroll streamed the series worldwide except Asia.

Following the final episode of the first season, a second season was announced, which aired from July 5 to September 20, 2024, on the Super Animeism Turbo programming block. (Note: MBS and TBS listed the second season's premiere on July 4, 2024, at 24:26, which is effectively July 5 at 12:26 a.m. JST.) The opening theme song is "Charge!" performed by Hikari Kodama, and the ending theme song is "Nacchatta!" (なっちゃった！) performed by VTuber Aglio, Olio e Peperoncino (a.k.a. Pepechi).

==== Episodes ====
===== Season 1 (2023) =====
| No. overall | No. in season | Title | Directed by (Note: Production staff information is taken from the ending credits of each episode.) | Written by | Storyboarded by | Original release date |
|---|---|---|---|---|---|---|
| 1 | 1 | "Familia"; Transliteration: "Famiria" (Japanese: ファミリア) | Kimiharu Mutō | Keiichirō Ōchi | Satoshi Kuwabara | April 8, 2023 (Note: This episode aired at 1:53 a.m. JST, 28 minutes after the original air time on MBS/TBS.) |
Following the death of his estranged grandmother, Sachiko, 19-year-old Hayato inherits her Café Familia, which he intends to turn into a car park. While visiting the house where Sachiko raised him, he is shocked to find five girls living there. Ouka, Ami, Riho, Shiragiku and Akane are Familia's waitresses and Sachiko's unofficial granddaughters. Uncaring due to his past falling out with Sachiko, Hayato evicts them. They decide to manipulate Hayato by seducing then blackmailing him. Hayato angrily rejects Ouka and Ami so Shiragiku is deliberately given alcohol, causing her repressed lechery and male body odour fetish to emerge. She jumps on Hayato but Ami, as the girl's self-appointed bodyguard, "rescues" Shiragiku and beats up Hayato, unintentionally foiling the girls' scheme to blackmail him. Developers arrive to discuss demolition work, but when Familia's sign is damaged, Hayato regrets falling out with Sachiko and retrieves the sign. Sensing his feelings, Ouka makes pilaf from Sachiko's recipe. Hayato finally cries over Sachiko's death. Looking at Sachiko's records, he realizes Familia is bankrupt because Sachiko is paying the girls, despite Familia being too small to sustain five employees. Hayato abruptly decides to reopen Familia but warns them that unless Familia becomes profitable in one year, he will demolish it.
| 2 | 2 | "A Promise with Grandma"; Transliteration: "Obā-chan to no Yakusoku" (Japanese: おばあちゃんとの約束) | Kōki Onoue | Keiichirō Ōchi | Satoshi Kuwabara | April 15, 2023 (Note: This episode aired at 1:23 a.m. JST, 2 minutes before the original air time on MBS/TBS.) |
Hayato forces the girls to share household chores. When they realize Hayato has seen their underwear while doing laundry, they send him to clean Familia as punishment. Shiragiku insists Hayato eat with them at mealtimes like family. When Hayato and Ouka see each other naked in the bathroom because there was no sign, Ami beats him up even though Ouka walked in on him. Hayato practices making coffee, but the girls agree his coffee is terrible. Later, the antisocial Akane somehow makes excellent coffee. Despite being annoyed by her, Hayato asks for help. Akane realizes Sachiko was right, he does look cute whilst sulking. A childish Hayato responds that she looks cute when she smiles, but she doesn't react and shows him how to make coffee. After Hayato leaves, Akane is shown to be quite flustered. Hayato is again beaten by Ami, this time for seeing her naked in the bathroom, even though he put up a sign. Hayato takes Riho on courtesy visits to advertise Familia's reopening, but Riho scolds him for acting moody, putting people off. Realizing she is right, Hayato promises to do better. Riho rewards him by flashing her panties, making him fall down the stairs. Riho is shown with a shrine fortune predicting she will find love with a co-worker.
| 3 | 3 | "Opening!"; Transliteration: "Kaiten!" (Japanese: 開店！) | Yūji Kanzaki | Mayumi Morita | Kenji Setō | April 22, 2023 (Note: This episode aired at 1:38 a.m. JST, 13 minutes after the original air time on MBS/TBS.) |
Hayato and Ouka argue constantly, so Riho advises Hayato to find a solution. Akane advises compliments, so he praises Ouka several times, but Ouka takes it as sarcasm. He later finds Ouka in her waitress uniform, which he compliments as cute, making Ouka smile as she made their uniforms herself. Shiragiku, accidentally drunk again, ruins the moment by disturbing Hayato. Hayato pays the girls some wages, revealing he has money in the stock market. Ami tries to distract Hayato from discovering she broke his phone and laptop, but fails. This prevents Hayato from selling his stocks in a suddenly bankrupt company, wiping out his savings. He punishes Ami for breaking his phone and laptop. Now entirely financially dependent on Familia, Hayato announces the girls will have to rotate shifts so only two work at a time. Familia reopens with multiple satisfied customers, until the arrival of Fuwa, the loan shark who always harassed Sachiko over the money she owed. Hayato keeps his temper, even stopping the girls from hitting Fuwa when he insults Sachiko. However, when Fuwa intentionally exposes Shiragiku's panties, Hayato blackmails him and throws him out while their customers applaud and promise to be his witnesses in case Fuwa comes back. Fuwa swears revenge for insulting him. Shiragiku realizes Hayato has not changed since their 15-year relationship as childhood friends.
| 4 | 4 | "Cherry Blossom Festival!"; Transliteration: "Sakuramatsuri!" (Japanese: 桜まつり！) | Taiji Kawanishi | Keiichirō Ōchi | Satoshi Kuwabara | April 29, 2023 |
Wanting to recover from the decreasing customers at Familia, Hayato decides to open a stall at the Cherry Blossom Festival. Shiragiku suggests cherry liqueur cookies but gets drunk and molests Hayato, who is then punished by Ami. Akane gives Hayato a cookie recipe she and Sachiko developed. They open the stall, but Ouka is harassed by Fuwa's grandson and his thugs. The other stall owners drive them away, but Familia's stall is vandalized overnight. Hayato recalls Sachiko had an old food cart which they quickly spruced up into a mobile café stall, which was a success thanks to Riho's social media work. The same thugs meet them on the way home and continue harassing them. Fuwa's grandson punches Hayato, who took it on purpose, believing Fuwa's reputation protects him from being arrested by the police. Claiming self-defense under Hayato's orders, Ami beats up the grandson and the thugs. Much to her dismay, Hayato threatens them further by claiming Ouka is a secret murderous gang leader, so the thugs flee. Hayato recorded the whole conversation about Fuwa's connections to corrupt police officers to prevent further retaliation. Ouka is surprised Hayato took the punch on purpose so they would not vandalize Sachiko's food cart.
| 5 | 5 | "Day-off"; Transliteration: "Teikyūbi" (Japanese: 定休日) | Yuri Uema | Keiichirō Ōchi | Yuri Uema; Satoshi Kuwabara | May 6, 2023 |
Hayato notices that between college and Familia, Riho is working too much. Riho is grateful for how Sachiko helped her and wants to make Familia successful. She flashes back to her mother, who told her laziness is worthless. Hayato tells her she should do more things for herself, reminding her of Sachiko and making her think Hayato might be reliable. Hayato learns that Akane plays in a band on her days off, but will not let the girls attend her concerts. By chance, Hayato comes across her underground concert and finds that despite her usual indifference, she is a passionate, talented singer. Akane is embarrassed that he saw her sing, so he promises to keep her talent secret, but is surprised Akane is unwilling to try becoming a professional singer. Akane is further embarrassed Hayato has bought one of her CD's. The next week, the girls discuss living together with a man, but conclude from his personality Hayato won't try to seduce them. They wonder what Hayato plans to do when the year is over. Akane claims she wouldn't mind marrying Hayato, shocking the girls, then claims she was joking.
| 6 | 6 | "Two Months!"; Transliteration: "Nikagetsu!" (Japanese: 2か月！) | Tomoko Hiramuki | Mayumi Morita | Satoshi Kuwabara | May 13, 2023 |
Riho notices Hayato smiles whenever Shiragiku praises him, and Shiragiku is envious when Hayato pats Riho's head. Shiragiku is outraged Hayato plans to change Sachiko's old menu, leading to a taste test, a Sachiko sandwich against a new menu sandwich made by Riho. Aware that the girl's real motive is not the menu, Hayato claims he is full and does not try either sandwich. Ami becomes a perfect employee, worrying everybody. Akane suspects it is because Ami recently lost a karate match. Ami confirms that her coach even advised her not to try due to her opponent's strength. Hayato rejects this, pointing out Ami just needs to learn more moves. Ami recovers but breaks Hayato's new laptop, followed by Ouka breaking his phone. Ami makes her usual offer of a breast squeeze as compensation, but is shocked when Hayato takes her offer and punishes her by giving her a mad breast-squeezing rampage. Humiliated, she decides to stop offering breast squeezes from now on. After the girls start acting strangely, Hayato realizes that despite appearances, they are just employees, not his family, and almost tells them so, only to find they had planned a party to celebrate Familia's two-month anniversary. Hayato realizes they are his family after all. Akane receives a phone call from her mother that upsets her.
| 7 | 7 | "A Year in My Life"; Transliteration: "Atashi no Ichi-nen" (Japanese: アタシの1年) | Mie Matsushima | Keiichirō Ōchi | Satoshi Kuwabara | May 20, 2023 |
Noticing Akane's behavior, Hayato deduces she is planning to quit and move out due to her mother. Akane is grateful for Hayato's help, jokingly offering a breast squeeze as repayment, but Hayato asks her for a date instead. The girls discover the secret date and are suspicious. Akane realizes the date is Hayato's way of asking her to share her problem. She eventually reveals her family owns a trading company; she has been the sole heiress since her father's death, so her mother has chosen a fiancé for her and is pressuring her to have children. Hayato deduces from the lousy coffee she just made Akane doesn't want to go. The girls agree she cannot leave, so Akane asks Hayato to help her. They meet Akane's mother, but she cannot speak her mind, so Hayato gives her a harsh scolding that she needs to stop making excuses and start standing up for herself. With that, Akane gains the courage to defy her mother. She relents and tells Akane can live as she pleases and seems to be familiar with Hayato's family name Kasukabe. The other girls are relieved Akane is staying. As she leaves, her mother cheerfully points out that if Akane wants to marry Hayato, she must defeat the other girls first, much to her embarrassment as she denies her claim. In private, Akane thanks Hayato for his help by hugging him and promising to make his coffee for the rest of his life. An embarrassed Hayato warns her not to make fun of him and walks away. Delighted, she giggles at his reaction, implying that her confession was real.
| 8 | 8 | "A Beach Hut!"; Transliteration: "Umi no Ie!" (Japanese: 海の家！) | Motomasa Maeda | Mayumi Morita | Satoshi Kuwabara | May 27, 2023 |
Hayato reveals his plan to open a Familia beach hut after paying their wages, but this would involve the girls giving up their summer break to work, and the hut costs four-month profits to build. Akane rejoins her bandmates to start singing again. The girls agree to work the summer and immediately discuss whether to wear beach uniforms or bikinis, depending on which one flusters Hayato more, until Hayato insists on shorts and vests. Shiragiku gets drunk-touching alcohol with cleaning wipes and bothers a half-naked Hayato. Akane changes her band name like Hayato had suggested, making the others worry she has become a serious rival for Hayato's affections. Shiragiku creates a watermelon parfait as the hut's signature item, followed by a photoshoot that goes viral due to Ami wearing a bizarre mask. On the opening day, Riho sees Akane talking with Hayato instead of working and becomes angry at them before fainting from overwork and heatstroke. Hayato scolds her for worrying him again, which makes her feel less jealous, though she throws a tantrum when Hayato refuses to apologize to Akane for her. Akane overhears this anyway and smiles.
| 9 | 9 | "Riho and Her Past"; Transliteration: "Riho to, Sono Kako" (Japanese: 流星と、その過去) | Kōji Matsumura | Mayumi Morita | Satoshi Kuwabara | June 3, 2023 |
Riho yells at Hayato when bikini girls flirt with him. Akane teaches Ouka to make coffee, though it doesn't go well. Hayato learns Shiragiku has a guaranteed chef career after college and wonders why she bothers to work at a coffee shop. Fuwa’s grandson and thugs visit the hut and hassle Riho, so Hayato sends Ami to scare them away. Riho decides to apologize for yelling, but when she sees more bikini girls flirting with him, she yells again. Akane tells Hayato her next song is about first love. Before he gets her hint, Ami pulls him into the ocean as a prank. Akane teaches Ami to make coffee, and she does better than Ouka. Hayato has to force Riho to take a break so she will not faint again. A news reporter accidentally reveals Riho's past as a child actress, upsetting her. It is revealed that Riho's mother overworked her, leading Riho's father to divorce her over concerns for their daughter's health, which Riho never recovered from. Hayato assures her Familia's success does not matter if it risks her health, so she agrees to relax more and cries in Hayato's arms. It turns out the girls knew about her past, but did not think it was important since to them she is just Riho, not child actress Riho.
| 10 | 10 | "Ouka and Kikka"; Transliteration: "Ōka to Kikka" (Japanese: 桜花と橘花) | Mie Matsushima | Keiichirō Ōchi | Satoshi Kuwabara | June 10, 2023 |
Ouka's twin sister Kikka tracks her to Familia and is angry that Ouka only has part-time employment and a bizarre living arrangement. She proceeds to insult the girls, Hayato, and Familia as inappropriate for their respectable Makuzawa family, so Ouka slaps her. Kikka leaves angry. Ouka explains that her family has all graduated from Tokyo University for generations, but she couldn't handle the pressure from their parents and left to study fashion. Kikka observes everyone from a distance while Ouka remembers that Kikka agreed to attend university so their parents would let her study fashion. Hayato points out that Kikka continuing to hang around can only mean she is worried about Ouka, so he gives her the day off to talk to her. Kikka reveals she wanted to go to university, so Ouka acting like she forced her to go and then distancing herself is infuriating. Ouka realizes Kikka misses her, and they reconcile. Kikka reveals Hayato impressed her; he was the only one not to mistake her for Ouka. Later, Ouka thanks Hayato for his help and asks how he knew Kikka was not her when even their parents still mix them up. Hayato points out Kikka is left-handed, but she had also shouted at Ami, which Ouka would never do as she is too kind-hearted. Ouka becomes unexpectedly flustered.
| 11 | 11 | "Fireworks of Love"; Transliteration: "Koi no Hibana" (Japanese: 恋の火花) | Yuri Uema | Keiichirō Ōchi | Satoshi Kuwabara | June 17, 2023 |
Akane surprises Hayato by asking about his romantic future. Embarrassed, Hayato claims he will not think about it until he decides Familia's future. Akane accepts that he is not yet ready to accept or reject her confession. This is all overheard by Shiragiku. The house bathtub breaks, so they must bathe at a bathhouse while Hayato agrees to install a new bath and toilet. In the baths, the girls overhear the men talking and are embarrassed to learn Hayato is larger than average. Akane informs Riho she confessed to Hayato at the beach and needs to let him know soon if she loves Hayato as well. Riho finally confesses to Hayato, but instantly claims to be joking. Hayato is uncomfortable by this and repeats himself that he won't think about romance until Familia's future is decided. Riho accepts this, but the next day loses her temper as Akane now openly flirts with Hayato. Their rivalry is noticed by customers as they argue over Hayato. Ami steps in to calm them down and force them both to stop fighting. Akane admits she provoked Riho on purpose so she could be honest about her feelings, as she tends to keep them bottled up. Riho confirms her statement and apologizes for losing her temper. They both agree to be civilized rivals. Hayato witnesses this and runs off confused, afraid he did something wrong. Despite the misunderstanding, Akane and Riho both swear to tell Hayato how they really feel for him. That night, Hayato sees Shiragiku in Sachiko's room.
| 12 | 12 | "Two Encounters"; Transliteration: "Futatsu no Deai" (Japanese: 二つの出会い) | Taiji Kawanishi | Keiichirō Ōchi | Satoshi Kuwabara | June 24, 2023 |
Hayato decides to create a new menu item, but given their recent rivalry, Akane and Riho notice he does not trust either of them. Shiragiku is annoyed when Hayato casually mentions her moving out soon to get a real job, so she abruptly confesses to him as well. Thankfully, she was just drunk on kitchen disinfectant and passed out in her underwear. Hayato hears a rumour about Sachiko and finally demands to know why he saw Shiragiku in her room late at night. Shiragiku's flashback shows that Sachiko was once a 3-Michelin-star chef in Spain who mentored Shiragiku's father, which is how Shiragiku first met Hayato as children. Sachiko never wanted Hayato to know she had to quit being a chef to raise him. Hayato blames himself for ruining Sachiko's life, but Shiragiku assures him that Sachiko never once regretted choosing to raise him. Hayato decides he simply cannot let Familia fail. The other girls, all eavesdropping, tearfully agree to do whatever it takes to make Familia thrive, though their emotional outbursts only cause Hayato to yell in frustration. A flashforward shows an older Hayato, still working at Familia, but now with his teenage daughter, but which of the five girls he ended up marrying is left a mystery. As Hayato and the girls are having a picnic, a drunken Shiragiku tells everyone that she loves Hayato much to their shock, especially to Akane and Riho who have another rival in their hands to win Hayato's heart.

===== Season 2 (2024) =====
| No. overall | No. in season | Title | Directed by | Written by | Storyboarded by | Original release date |
|---|---|---|---|---|---|---|
| 13 | 1 | "A Dark Shadow Over Familia"; Transliteration: "Famiria ni Kuroi Kage" (Japanese: ファミリアに黒い影) | Kimiharu Mutō | Keiichirō Ōchi | Satoshi Kuwabara | July 5, 2024 |
Due to Akane and Shiragiku continuing to try to be closer to Hayato, Ouka calls a meeting where the girls openly discuss them all being in love with Hayato. Ouka claims to be intimately close with Hayato, having seen him naked, but this is quickly exposed as an exaggeration. Later, Ouka walks in on Hayato in the shower and cannot stop thinking about his anatomy. Shortly afterwards, she and Hayato fall victim to one of Ami’s booby traps and she lands on top of Hayato. His embarrassment causes Ouka to realize that she becomes aroused when tormenting him. Ami spots a ghost in the house, terrifying Akane, who has a fear of ghosts, so she is forced to ask Hayato to accompany her for protection in the toilet. The ghost is exposed as a stray cat, but the shock is horrible that Akane passes out, with her shirt lifted and her panties exposed, getting Hayato in trouble with the others. The decision is made to adopt the cat they name Sachiko after Hayato’s grandmother. Talking of Sachiko causes Shiragiku to remember that Sachiko once became emotional when talking about all the girls' grandmothers. Hayato finds a photograph showing that Sachiko and the girls' grandmothers were all Familia waitresses together as teenagers and begins to wonder if meeting the girls was fate.
| 14 | 2 | "A Bolt from the Blue"; Transliteration: "Seiten no Hekireki" (Japanese: 青天の霹靂) | Satoru Yamashita | Keiichirō Ōchi | Satoshi Kuwabara | July 12, 2024 |
Due to meddling from Kikka, their father mistakenly concludes Ouka is dating Hayato and summons him to their home. Hayato mistakenly believes they are talking about Ouka's career and does his best to impress Ouka so he can continue employing Ouka. However, her father believes they are discussing marriage and immediately gives his blessing for their engagement, to which Hayato remains ignorant. Ouka's grandmother, Harue, recognizes Hayato from his resemblance to his grandfather Masahiro and is happy to hear he married Sachiko. Ouka is intrigued that all their grandmothers knew each other and believes their meeting might have been fate. Fuwa reappears with news that he is opening his café, the Family, to put them out of business. Visiting Family, Hayato and the girls discover it is a blatant copy of Familia, including five beautiful waitresses who copy the girl's personalities but accidentally exaggerated to ridiculous extremes. Despite this, Hayato notes Family is three times larger than Familia, the coffee and food are of higher quality, which Familia cannot afford to compete with, and it has a car park. He is afraid this might be the end of Familia, but the girls are determined not to be beaten and begin preparing for war against Family.
| 15 | 3 | "The First Counterstrike"; Transliteration: "Hangeki no Itte" (Japanese: 反撃の一手) | Mie Matsushima | Mayumi Morita | Satoshi Kuwabara | July 19, 2024 |
Shiragiku cannot improve their menu since the original menu was created by Sachiko, a three-star chef. Hayato tells her to stop focusing on Sachiko's menu, which was created to serve Familia's needs at the time, and come up with something that suits Familia's current crisis. Shiragiku begins planning a cutting-edge menu. Riho encounters her Family counterpart, Ririka, the internet idol. Shiragiku creates a menu based on Spanish snacks. The Family waitresses are shocked when Familia's popularity suddenly skyrockets when Riho releases a video documenting her journey from child actress to waitress trying to save her grandmother's café. Local TV stations soon pick up the story, making Familia popular again while Family suffers an unexpected surge of negative online reviews criticizing their badly made food and poor customer service. Ririka refuses to give up, but her confidence is shaken when Riho points out Ririka's popularity has decreased due to her naïve attitude toward the idol industry. They notice Ririka forgot to turn off her camera where her audience saw their entire argument, leading to messages of both disappointment and support as their fans discuss which of them was in the wrong. Riho expects Hayato to be angry as they lose customers again, but Hayato had already deduced Riho provoked the argument on camera to help boost Ririka’s failing popularity just a little.
| 16 | 4 | "Eleven Co-ed Cohabitors"; Transliteration: "Danjo 11-ri Kyōdō Seikatsu" (Japanese: 男女11人共同生活) | Minoru Yamaoka | Keiichirō Ōchi | Minoru Yamaoka | July 26, 2024 (Note: This episode aired at 12:36 a.m. JST, 10 minutes after the original air time on MBS/TBS.) |
Due to Ririka accidentally leaving her camera on her, fans discover Fuwa's plan to ruin Familia, so Fuwa fires the waitresses and plans to demolish Family. Ririka is fired by her idol agency. Hayato finds the girls have invited the Family waitresses Ririka, Mao, Moemi, Hekiru, and Valentina to move into Familia as well, since they are now unemployed, in debt, and homeless. A serious Hayato gives them two rooms to share but warns them to find somewhere else to live soon. Hayato quickly finds that living with ten girls makes life for him completely unbearable. Akane and Ouka notice Ririka close to Hayato, even having meetings with him in his room, so they spy on them with help from Mao, but discover Hayato was helping Ririka plan to take over Family from Fuwa and run it herself. While negotiating with Fuwa, Ririka claims she tricked Hayato into handing over his savings, and Fuwa is delighted that Hayato is now bankrupt that he sells Ririka's Family for half its value, ¥6.5 million. The other waitresses decide to work for Ririka and rent a house together, becoming Familia’s neighbours. As Hayato had given her all Familia’s profits to buy Family, Ririka signs a legal repayment plan so that he eventually gets it back. Hayato slowly realizes he just spent all his money creating a business rival.
| 17 | 5 | "A Hot Spring Trip for the Familia Party"; Transliteration: "Onsen Ryokō Famiria Goikkō sama" (Japanese: 温泉旅行 ファミリア御一行様) | Taiji Kawanishi | Mayumi Morita | Satoshi Kuwabara | August 2, 2024 |
Family reopens as the Chiyoda Diner serving Japanese cuisine so as not to compete with Familia's coffee-based menu. Ririka gives Riho a ticket for a hot spring inn where she could be alone with Hayato and seduce him. Riho invites Hayato, making it clear the trip would be romantic. However, before he can answer, the others arrive home – having coincidentally won tickets to the same inn – causing Riho anger. As there are only three rooms available, Riho, Akane, and Shiragiku compete over who will share Hayato’s room, but Ami ends up winning. Later, in the hot spring the girls hear Hayato bathing with other men and are amazed to overhear that Hayato is quite well endowed. Afterwards, Hayato notices Ami deliberately trying not to be recognized as the inn is actually in her hometown. The girls debate on ambushing Hayato in the bath. Ami's foster sister Eri tracks her down, hoping she will visit her grandmother Katsuyo, her only living relative, but Ami declines as Katsuyo has dementia and no longer recognizes her. Ami refuses to see her until she is cured, but Hayato warns her not to be like him, as he regrets not visiting Sachiko before she died. Following his advice, Ami agrees to visit Katsuyo soon.
| 18 | 6 | "The End of a Scary Dream"; Transliteration: "Kowai Yume no Owari" (Japanese: 怖い夢の終わり) | Satoru Yamashita | Mayumi Morita | Satoshi Kuwabara | August 9, 2024 |
The girls accompany Ami for emotional support. Katsuyo still does not recognize Ami and pushes Ami away when she tries to speak to her. Seeing Ami cry, Hayato, relying on his resemblance to his grandfather Masahiro, yells at Katsuyo like Masahiro used to. The shock brings her memories back as she remembers Ami, who is so glad to have her grandmother back. Hayato decides they can stay an extra night. Unfortunately, all they can afford is a single room in a rundown inn resembling a haunted house. Akane is so scared of the ghostly landlady that she almost returns to Familia, until she learns the inn has a mixed bathing hot spring. Shiragiku gets drunk when their meal turns out to contain alcohol and causes a lecherous commotion. Hayato bathes alone but Ami turns up naked, though for once she decides not to beat him up. Instead, she reveals to Hayato that thanks to him, the doctors realized Katsuyo was misdiagnosed with dementia and will completely recover with treatment. Wanting to thank him, she offers him a free breast grope. Hayato refuses, but seeing how upset she is, he reluctantly goes along with it and gropes her naked breasts, cheering her up. Meanwhile, the girls begin plotting how to take advantage of everyone sharing the same room.
| 19 | 7 | "I'm Not Letting You Sleep Tonight"; Transliteration: "Nemurasenai Yoru" (Japanese: 眠らせない夜) | Toshiaki Kanbara | Mayumi Morita | Satoshi Kuwabara | August 16, 2024 |
Akane moves to seduce Hayato first when she once again requires Hayato to escort her to the toilet. There, her attempt to seduce him ends abruptly when he falls through a wall. Shiragiku makes the second attempt, but as she is still drunk, all she manages is to fondle her breasts before pushing him through the wall again. Finally, Riho lures him out of the room, but he falls through the same wall a third time on purpose before she can even try anything. In the morning, Hayato is so exhausted the girls can’t wake him and are shocked to find his manhood poking from his underwear. Ouka feigns disgust while the other three are fascinated, having never seen it before. Ami arrives at that moment, ending their examination. Having several brothers, Ami is used to such things and forcibly wakes Hayato by grabbing it and squeezing, traumatizing him. Returning to Familia, the girls from Chiyoda demand details. From their description, Mao confirms Hayato is indeed very well endowed. They are shocked to learn all of them failed in seducing Hayato, but Ami was the one who made the most progress, having shared his futon, bathed together, and given him a breast squeeze. Realizing what they are discussing, Hayato barges in to yell at them, only to find all ten girls undressing after Ami and Tina spilled drinks on everyone.
| 20 | 8 | "It's Not a Joke"; Transliteration: "Jōdan Nanka ja nai" (Japanese: 冗談なんかじゃない) | Mie Matsushima | Keiichiro Ochi | Satoshi Kuwabara | August 23, 2024 |
Hayato realizes everyone forgot Shiragiku's birthday three weeks ago. With Akane's help, he buys Shiragiku a cute kitchen apron. Akane asks to enjoy themselves while shopping as if it was a date, causing Hayato to realize he forgot today was Akane’s birthday. Instead of a gift, Akane asks him to marry her, but he refuses her request. As Christmas approaches, Akane continues to demand an answer to her marriage proposal, but Hayato continues to brush her off. Men suddenly kidnap Hayato and Akane to Akane's family home on orders from Akane's grandmother, Yōko, another of the past Familia waitresses. Youko is aware that Akane wishes to marry him, but Hayato cannot decide. Unhappy with this, Youko attacks him with a sword, and asks if he would choose to save Akane or himself. Hayato states he'd do everything to prevent such things from happening. Walking home together, Akane apologizes for her eccentric relatives. Hayato reveals he is worried their marriage has implications as the Hououji are an important family; if they marry, either the Hououji or Kasukabe name will cease to exist and he does not feel he loves her enough to make the decision. Delighted, Akane decides to devote herself to making him love her enough to decide. Youko meets with her daughter and suggests that Hayato impressed her. Meanwhile, Ami and Ouka have gotten lost trying to search for the kidnapped Akane and Hayato, not realizing they have returned home.
| 21 | 9 | "Mother and Daughter"; Transliteration: "Hahatoko" (Japanese: 母と娘) | Yuri Kamima | Mayumi Morita | Yuri Kamima | August 30, 2024 |
Riho gets a disappointing part in a TV show and is visited by her lost father, who explains he and his ex-wife Ruri disagreed over pressuring Riho to become an actress. During their divorce, he was banned from seeing Riho until she was 20. Despite being estranged, he asks Riho to visit Ruri as she is refusing treatment for terminal cancer. At the hospital, Riho is unexpectedly harsh, reminding Ruri she was a terrible mother and her eventual death will mean nothing to her. Her father is shocked that he slaps her, but Ruri realizes Riho was acting and those were not her real feelings. Leaving, Riho is surprised that Hayato could also tell she was acting. Ruri admits to her ex that she loved acting until she met famous actress Yumiko and realised her own acting was average at best, causing an inferiority complex that only worsened on realising Yumiko was his mother. He shows Ruri a video of Riho acting, causing Ruri to agree to treat her cancer so she can see what Riho does with her life. Riho is happy manipulating Ruri into getting treatment. Hayato is impressed and wonders if Riho plans to become a serious actress like her grandmother. Riho is not sure as she has never acted in a romantic scene before and asks a panicked Hayato to help her practice.
| 22 | 10 | "Christmas Party!"; Transliteration: "Kurisumasu Pāti!" (Japanese: クリスマスパーティ！) | Minoru Yamaoka | Keiichiro Ochi | Minoru Yamaoka | September 6, 2024 |
Hayato is looking forward to a relaxing Christmas, unaware that all the girls are scheming for romance purposes. Riho panics after learning Akane made a marriage proposal. Hekiro warns Akane that while she, Riho, and Shiragiku are openly pursuing Hayato, she shouldn’t forget Ouka or Ami, despite both not competing for him. Shiragiku worries over not being as proactive as Akane and Riho. At the party, Riho unsuccessfully tries to sabotage her rivals by failing to get Shiragiku drunk, and telling Akane a ghost story only scares her right into Hayato’s arms. Shiragiku kisses Hayato in secret, but is disappointed he continues to act normally towards her. After two days she confronts him, only to be told that she kisses him all the time when drunk, so he just assumed she had been drunk again. Faced with the truth for the first time, plus the lewd video evidence on Ami’s phone, Shiragiku is embarrassed and apologizes to everyone. At first, Riho and Akane are not worried until they realize Shiragiku has made massive progress by kissing Hayato while sober. After putting on a mock trial for Shiragiku’s many lewd offences, with Mao as presiding judge, Hayato angrily learns what everyone did during his exposed manhood incident. Mao declares Shiragiku innocent of stealing a kiss. However, for the sake of fairness, she also decides Akane, Ouka, Riho, and Ami are each entitled to one kiss with Hayato.
| 23 | 11 | "Kisses, Love and Things to Think About"; Transliteration: "Kisu to Suki to Kangaegoto" (Japanese: キスとスキと考えごと) | Satoru Yamashita | Keiichiro Ochi | Satoshi Kuwabara | September 13, 2024 |
Despite Mao giving the girls the right to kiss Hayato, Ouka, and Ami refuse her request, but Akane kisses Hayato straight away, which results in Riho getting jealous. Riho demands that Hayato act out her high school fantasy. After finding the best location, Hayato tries to kiss her, only for Riho to panic, slap him, and demand a kiss when she least expects it. Unfortunately, waiting for the kiss puts Riho on alert, so Hayato cannot find an opportunity for days. He enlists Ami to distract her, but Riho is on such high alert again that avoids Ami's karate chop. Riho’s father phones her with news that Ruri will fully recover. At that moment, Hayato takes advantage to suddenly kiss her much to her relief. However, she enjoys it so much that Ami successfully bonks her on the head while she is distracted, ruining the moment. After so much kissing, Hayato has lewd dreams of Akane, Shiragiku, and Riho, so he does his best to avoid them. Ami walks in on him having another dream and finds his manhood swollen to an unbelievable size, so she applies cooling ointment to reduce the swelling. Reacting to his screams, the others rush to see the swelling themselves, but are quickly thrown out. Hayato spends New Year's Day with the girls remembering Sachiko. They also visit a shrine to pray for the next year. Compared to the others who all pray for success in careers, college or even marriage, Ouka feels left behind as she does not have actual plans at all.
| 24 | 12 | "The Last Pilaf"; Transliteration: "Saigo no Pirafu" (Japanese: 最後のピラフ) | Taiji Kawanishi | Keiichiro Ochi | Satoshi Kuwabara | September 20, 2024 |
During their New Year's dinner, Shiragiku reveals she has trained to drink small amounts without losing control. Unfortunately, it still arouses her, so she still molests Hayato. Now old enough, Akane also drinks, but turns out to be a sad drunk who cries a lot. Hayato reveals he has decided to drop out of university to manage Familia. This causes Ouka to admit she will be moving out to work at a fashion company in France. Ami is so upset that she refuses to celebrate her 18th birthday and accuses Hayato of not caring about Ouka leaving when he acts calm about her situation. Akane points out to her that Hayato is upset at Ouka leaving, who is especially sensitive to saying goodbye to family, but hides it behind his stoicism. Ouka makes Sachiko’s pilaf rice for Hayato one last time and explains she always worried about Familia closing, but Hayato quitting school was a relief, so she is now confident enough to chase her own goals. At the airport, Ouka says an emotional goodbye to everyone, especially to Ami, who doesn't want her to leave, but notices Hayato being depressed. Unable to stop herself, she sadistically torments him one last time before she suddenly kisses him, redeeming her right to one kiss she had previously refused and snapping him out of his depression. After Ouka leaves, the others return to Familia to carry on the chaos without her. In France, Ouka works her hardest so that they will be proud of her.

== Reception ==
As of April 2023, the series has 1 million copies in circulation.

Anime News Network had three editors review the first episode of the anime: James Beckett found nothing "actively terrible or migrane-inducing" with the series opener but felt it was "played out and low effort", saying it lacked more lively animation to make it a "pure, shameless comedy" and recommended that people seek out "funnier comedies and sweeter romances" throughout the spring season. Nicholas Dupree commended the first half for giving its audience the cheesecake fanservice with "professional efficiency", but criticized the second half for Hayato's "extremely hackneyed" family story clashing with said fanservice, noting the cast were not "well-rounded" and "too unlikable" to deliver the drama and comedy respectively. He concluded that "there doesn't seem to be much else in the way of ecchi shows this season, so if that's your bag, I guess you can do the opposite of reading Playboy for the articles." Richard Eisenbeis respected the premiere for being an unashamed "good ol' fanservice harem rom-com" and singled out Akane as the most interesting out of the female cast, concluding: "With solid character designs, and at least one character that genuinely intrigues me, I might give this show another chance next week. I mean, it's definitely a fanservice anime, but part of me wonders if it might be something more."

Eisenbeis reviewed the complete first season in 2024 and gave it an overall C+ grade. He criticized the first half for being "painfully cliché" with its tired setup and one-note, cookie-cutter caricatures, but praised the second half for Hayato's "arrogant asshole" character helping to guide the female cast to confront their personal issues and make them more than stereotypes, concluding that: "Ultimately, The Café Terrace and Its Goddesses has left me conflicted. The first few episodes are so boring and uninspired that I can't, in good conscience, recommend the anime. However, at the same time, the back half is good enough that I am honestly looking forward to the second season."

Anime News Network had two editors review the first episode of the second season: Eisenbeis was positive towards the girls' conversation over their yearning to win over Hayato, the "solid comedic twist" involving Ouka's relationship with Hayato, and the overarching plot points set up for the season. Kennedy felt it was off to "a promising start" by delivering its brand of humor from the first season and planting seeds for the rival café plot, concluding that: "I find that watching this show as a comedy—as a weird, ironic performance art of sorts—is incredibly fun. And if this episode is indicative of what the rest of this season will be like, then it'll be absolutely delightful." Kennedy reviewed the complete second season and gave it an overall A grade. While observing that the "aggressively corny" barrage of "ecchi harem clichés" will come across as "boring and played-out" to some viewers, Kennedy praised the self aware maturity of Hayato and the "distinct personal narratives" that each girl has throughout the episodes, critiquing that "Funny both ironically and unironically, it's found a way to be a perfectly balanced blend of unoriginality and freshness."
