= Hitman (manga) =

Japanese manga series

- Cover of the Weekly Shōnen Magazine issue Hitman debuted in, featuring Kenzaki Ryuunosuke and Takanashi Tsubasa.

ヒットマン (Hittoman)
- Genre: Romantic comedy
- Manga
- Written by: Kōji Seo
- Published by: Kodansha
- Imprint: Shōnen Magazine Comics
- Magazine: Weekly Shōnen Magazine
- Original run: June 20, 2018 – February 17, 2021
- Volumes: 13

Hitman (Japanese: ヒットマン, Hepburn: Hittoman) is a Japanese manga series written and illustrated by Kōji Seo. It follows Kenzaki Ryuunosuke as he becomes a manga editor and aims to make author Takanashi Tsubasa the number one author in Japan. It was serialized in Kodansha's Weekly Shōnen Magazine from June 2018 to February 2021, with its chapters collected in thirteen tankōbon volumes.

== Plot ==
College Senior Kenzaki Ryuunosuke is interviewing at Kodansha when he finds and reads a rough draft of a proposed manga. Takanashi Tsubasa finds him and scolds him for reading a manga at a job interview and he tells her it is seriously interesting! Kenzaki is hired and later receives a call from an aspiring manga artist who wants to submit a name. The author is Takanashi and reveals that the manga was hers. She says she did not interview because he told her the manga was interesting and now he has to take responsibility for it. He says that he will and will make her the number one manga artist in Japan. As Kenzaki becomes the editor for a number of authors and improves as an editor, he and Takanashi continue to work through various obstacles toward their goal together.

== Characters ==
=== Main ===
Ryuunosuke Kenzaki (剣埼龍之介, Kenzaki Ryūnosuke)
He starts working as an editor for Weekly Shōnen Magazine after college. He becomes the editor for Takanashi after having met her while he was interviewing, pledging to make her the number one author in Japan. He also becomes the editor for Amaya and Shimakaze, both popular authors. Natsume serves as his mentor, however, Nakata fills in when Kenzaki first starts as Natsume is on vacation. His parents own an onsen in Izu. As a child, it was there he saw the editors of Weekly Shōnen Magazine celebrating being number one in circulation and decided that he wanted to be manga editor.
Tsubasa Takanashi (小鳥遊 翼, Takanashi Tsubasa)
After Kenzaki calls her manga name interesting while interviewing to become an editor she decides to skip the interview and become an author instead. When she returns to submit her name Kenzaki becomes her editor. She ties for first place in the newcomers contest with her manga Love Letter. However, when it is published, it does not do as well as Soul:Green, the manga it tied with and is not serialized. She reworks it as a short manga and manages to get serialized, debuting at third place in reader surveys. She is the daughter of famous manga author Masato Katsuragi and wants to surpass him as a form of revenge for neglecting his family in favor if his work. After her mother died, she was raised harshly by her grandmother. She exhibits jealousy and is competitive when the other female authors interact with Kenzaki.
Shiori Amaya (天谷 栞, Amaya Shiori)
A successful manga author. Her series, Kirikura wa Shinobanai, is initially edited by Natsumi and he uses it to mentor Kanzaki. She also acts as a mentor to Takanashi, hiring her as an assistant so she can improve her illustrating skills. When Kanzaki takes over editing from Natsumi, she ranks number one in the reader survey for the first time. She is romantically interested in Natsume. She was also a character in A Town Where You Live.
Nonoka Shimakaze (島風 奈佳, Shimakaze Nonoka)
A successful manga artist. She started her series, Shakunetsu no Onigami at Monthly Sirius Houjou at the age of 16. It ran for two years selling more than one million volumes. She transfers to Weekly Shōnen Magazine to start her new series, King's Knight. Kenzaki is her editor and she drops out of high school shortly before graduation and moves into the apartment next to his to focus on her work. King's Knight debuts at number two in the reader surveys. She has a crush on Kenzaki and sees Takanashi as a rival.

=== Secondary ===
Akira Natsume (夏目 晶, Natsume Akira)
A senior editor and Kenzaki's mentor. He specializes in helping wrap up manga that may be cancelled. He was Amaya's editor on Kirikura wa Shinobanai for five years. When he is assigned three popular authors coming from other companies under the condition they work with him, he passes it on to Kanzaki. He is one of three remaining employees who remember when Weekly Shōnen Magazine was number one in circulation and was on the celebratory trip to the Kenzaki Inn.
Hiroto Asama (浅間 大翔, Asama Hiroto)
He starts working for Weekly Shōnen Magazine at the same time as Kenzaki and serves as a rival. A series he is editing, Soul:Green, ties with Takanashi's Love Letter to win the Newcomers Award. It does better in the reader surveys and is serialized. He works with Houjo to headhunt three popular authors from other magazines when Houjo joins the company. His mentor is Natori.
Shinji Houjo (北条 伸時, Hōjo Shinji)
Initially, the editor-in-chief of Monthly Shōnen Sirius, but takes over as editor-in-chief of Weekly Shōnen Magazine when Yamashirou transfers. He does not like Takanashi and is set against serializing any of her work. He brings two Vice-Editor-in-chiefs with him from Monthly Shōnen Sirius, Unono Tsuyoshi and Agama Tetsuya.
Kazutake Yagami (八神 千虎, Yagami Kazutake)
The deputy editor-in-chief and one of the four best editors at Weekly Shōnen Magazine. He is one of three remaining employees who remember when the magazine was number one in circulation and was on the celebratory trip to the Kenzaki Inn. As Kenzaki begins to become a more successful editor, he helps him get Takanashi opportunities despite Houjo's objections.
Rentarou Yamashirou (山城 廉太郎, Yamashirou Rentarō)
The editor-in-chief of Weekly Shōnen Magazine. He is one of three remaining employees who remember when the magazine was number one in circulation and was on the celebratory trip to the Kenzaki Inn. He gives Kenzaki an "A" rating on his employment examination because he describes the exact chapter in his favorite manga when it was number one in reader survey rankings, despite it later being cancelled. He transfers to Young Magazine and is replaced by Houjo.
Mio Kawaguchi (川内 美緒, Kawaguchi Mio)
A college friend of Kenzaki working for the same company as an editor for the fashion magazine Vivi. Others mistaking her and Kanzaki for a couple is a recurring gag in the series. In response she becomes flustered, implying she is romantically interested in him. Her mentor is Wakatsuki.

=== Other ===
Masato Katsuragi (桂木 マサト, Katsuragi Masato)
The author of Touch Up and Traveling. Touch Up frequently is number one in the reader survey. He is Takanashi's father, but after her mother dies and sends her to live with her mother's family.
Aiko Wakatsuki (若月 藍子, Wakatsuki Aiko)
A senior editor for ViVi. She is in a relationship with Yagami.
Taishi Nakata (仲田 帝士, Nakata Taishi)
iAn editor and a colleague of Kenzaki. He helps mentor Kenzaki prior to Natsume.
Otoguro Kazuhiko (乙黒 和彦, Kazuhiko Otoguro)
An editor and a colleague of Kenzaki.
Kenji Natori (名取 賢治, Natori Kenji)
A senior editor and one of the four best editors at Weekly Shōnen Magazine.
Miyuki Watanuki (綿貫 雅, Watanuki Miyuki)
A senior editor and one of the four best editors at Weekly Shōnen Magazine. She is the only female editor.
Naoki Fushimi (伏見 直樹, Fushimi Naoki)
A senior editor and one of the four best editors at Weekly Shōnen Magazine.

== Publication ==
Hitman is written and illustrated by Kōji Seo. It was announced in April 2018, and ran in Kodansha's Weekly Shōnen Magazine from June 20, 2018, to February 17, 2021. Kodansha collected its chapters in thirteen tankōbon volumes, released from October 17, 2018, to March 17, 2021.

The manga is licensed in France by Pika Édition.
