= Kōji Seo =

Japanese manga artist

- 瀬尾 公治
- Born: July 26, 1974 (age 52); Hiroshima, Japan
- Occupation: Manga artist
- Years active: 1996 - present
- Known for: Suzuka; A Town Where You Live; Fuuka; The Café Terrace and Its Goddesses
- Awards: Weekly Shōnen Magazine's Rookie Award

Kōji Seo (瀬尾 公治, Seo Kōji; born July 26, 1974) is a Japanese manga creator from Shobara, Hiroshima, Japan.

He has stated in an interview that he was a member of his high school's track and field team and that he loves to watch baseball, both of which are emphasized in his hit manga Suzuka.

He debuted in 1996 with the one-shot HALF & HALF in Magazine Fresh. His first three series, W's, Cross Over and Suzuka mixed the genres of sports with high school romance. W's used tennis, Cross Over featured basketball, while Suzuka focused on track and field.

He was an assistant to Tsukasa Ōshima, and respects Fujiko F. Fujio and Masahito Soda.

== Works ==
Manga

- W's (W's～ダブルス～, Daburusu) (2000–2001 Magazine Special; Kodansha)
- Cross Over (2002–2003 Weekly Shōnen Magazine; Kodansha)
- Suzuka (涼風) (2004–2007 Weekly Shōnen Magazine; Kodansha)
- Love Letter: Kōji Seo's Collection of Short Stories (ラブレター ～瀬尾公治短編集～, Love Letter: Seo Kōji Tanpenshū) (2007 Kodansha)
  - Azusa (梓颯) (2005 Shōnen Magazine Wonder; Kodansha)
  - HALF & HALF (1996 Magazine Fresh; 2007 Magazine Special (reprint); Kodansha)
  - Love Letter (ラブレター) (2007 Magazine Special; Kodansha)
- A Town Where You Live (君のいる町, Kimi no Iru Machi) (2008–2014 Weekly Shōnen Magazine; Kodansha)
- Princess Lucia (2009–2015 Monthly Comic Blade; Mag Garden)
- LovePlus Rinko Days (ラブプラス Rinko Days) (2010–2011 Bessatsu Shōnen Magazine; Kodansha)
- Half & Half (2012–2016 Bessatsu Shōnen Magazine; Kodansha)
- Fuuka (風夏) (2014–2018 Weekly Shōnen Magazine; Kodansha)
- Hitman (2018–2021) Weekly Shōnen Magazine; Kodansha)
- The Café Terrace and Its Goddesses (女神のカフェテラス, Megami no Kafe Terasu) (2021–2025) Weekly Shōnen Magazine; Kodansha)
- Umine the Island Inn (あの島の海音荘, Ano Shima no Uminesō) (2026–present) Weekly Shōnen Magazine; Kodansha)

Anime

- Suzuka Episode 8 (2005) – Track & field club member
- Sayonara, Zetsubou-Sensei Episode 3 (2007) – End card
- The Heroic Legend of Arslan Episode 3 (2015) – End card
- Fuuka (2017) – Insert song lyrics, theme song lyrics
- Animation x Paralympic Episode 8 (2019) – Original creator

Video games

- Fire Emblem Heroes (2017) – Lute artwork

Other

- High School Girl Kimchi (2009, Hokubi Construction) – Design
