= Suzuka (manga) =

Japanese manga by Kōji Seo and its adaptations

- First tankōbon volume cover, featuring Suzuka Asahina

涼風
- Genre: Romantic comedy
- Manga
- Written by: Kōji Seo
- Published by: Kodansha
- English publisher: NA: Del Rey Manga (former); Kodansha USA (digital)
- Imprint: Shōnen Magazine Comics
- Magazine: Weekly Shōnen Magazine
- Original run: 18 February 2004 – 19 September 2007
- Volumes: 18
- Anime television series
- Directed by: Hiroshi Fukutomi
- Produced by: Tsukuru Maruyama; Gou Shukuri; Minoru Yoshida; Kazunari Ueda
- Written by: Hiroko Tokita
- Music by: Masanori Takumi
- Studio: Studio Comet
- Licensed by: Crunchyroll
- Original network: TV Tokyo
- English network: US: Funimation Channel
- Original run: 7 July 2005 – 29 December 2005
- Episodes: 26
- Light novel
- Written by: Ayuna Fujisaki
- Illustrated by: Kōji Seo
- Published by: Kodansha
- Imprint: KC Novels
- Published: 17 May 2007
- icon

Suzuka (涼風) is a Japanese manga series written and illustrated by Kōji Seo. It was serialized in Kodansha's shōnen manga magazine Weekly Shōnen Magazine from February 2004 to September 2007, with its chapters collected in 18 tankōbon volumes. Suzuka is a character-driven romance series that uses the athletics of track and field as a subplot. The series focuses on the life of the teenager Yamato Akitsuki, who moved to Tokyo to change himself, and his girlfriend Suzuka Asahina, a talented and high-scouted high jumper who lives in Yamato's aunt's dormitory and attends his new high school.

Suzuka was adapted into a 26-episode anime television series broadcast on TV Tokyo from July to December 2005. The manga was licensed for publication in North America by Del Rey Manga under their mature line; it published the first 15 volumes, before it folded and transferred its publication rights to Kodansha USA. Two light novels written by Ayuna Fujisaki based on the series have also been released.

== Plot ==
Suzuka is a sports-themed romance comedy series that intertwines the pursuit of love and athletics. It focuses on Yamato Akitsuki, a young man from rural Hiroshima Prefecture moving to the big city of Tokyo, and his new next-door neighbor, Suzuka Asahina, a skilled high jumper. Yamato falls in love with Suzuka and pursuing a relationship with her. As Yamato joins the track-and-field team to impress her, he discovers that he has the potential to become a top 100-meter sprinter.

Suzuka's character-driven plot predominantly makes use of dramatic structure to facilitate character development. Characterization is further achieved through the use of character backstory. The story in general employs a realistic tone, but occasionally uses surreal humour. Some events covered in the story are: track competitions, vacations, cultural festivals, as well as outings to a karaoke box and a theme park. The manga and anime follow the same storyline, but there are minor differences. One of these changes is that the nude scenes are less graphic in the anime than the manga.

== Characters ==
Yamato Akitsuki, the main protagonist of the series, has moved from his home in the Hiroshima Prefecture to stay at his aunt's dormitory in Tokyo. Yamato falls in love with his new next-door neighbor, Suzuka Asahina, a girl from Yokohama who was scouted by a local high school because of her high jump athletic ability. While the main female lead remains Suzuka throughout the series, Yamoto later meets several other girls: Honoka Sakurai, a girl whose family are caretakers of a local Shinto shrine, Miki Hashiba, a sprinter and friend of Suzuka, and others. Yamato also develops a friendship with Yasunobu Hattori, a perverted young man who dreams about polygamy and often gives relationship advice to Yamato.

== Media ==
=== Manga ===
Written and illustrated by Kōji Seo, Suzuka was first published as a one-shot in Kodansha's shōnen manga magazine Weekly Shōnen Magazine on 19 November 2003. (Note: The manga was published in the magazine's 51st issue of 2003 (cover date 3 December), released on 19 November of the same year.) It was later serialized in the same magazine from 18 February 2004 (Note: The manga debuted in the magazine's 12th issue of 2004 (cover date 3 March), released on 18 February of the same year.) to 19 September 2007. Its 166 chapters were collected in eighteen tankōbon volumes by Kodansha.

Suzuka was licensed for North American publication by Del Rey, becoming the publisher's first sports manga and second title to be added under its mature line, the first being the manga Basilisk. Fifteen volumes had been released in English with the first volume released on 29 August 2006 and the last, a 592-page collection containing volumes 13, 14 and 15, was released in North America on 31 August 2010, before Del Rey Manga folded and transferred its publishing rights to Kodansha USA. The manga was released completely by Kodansha USA in a digital edition from 11 October 2016 to 21 February 2017.

=== Anime ===
In April 2005, Weekly Shōnen Magazine announced through its website that Suzuka was adapted into an anime. Produced by Studio Comet and Marvelous Entertainment, the series is directed by Hiroshi Fukutomi, with Hiroko Tokita handling series composition, Tadashi Shida designing the characters and Masanori Takumi composing the music. The 26-episode anime aired on TV Tokyo from 7 July to 29 December 2005.

The anime series was licensed for English release in North America by Funimation. Their first DVD was released on 12 June 2007.

=== Music ===
The anime's music, including the background music and theme songs, was composed by Masanori Takumi and POM. The vocals for the opening and ending songs were provided by Coach☆. All members worked as a voice actors for one of the series' characters except one member. For the North American release, Funimation had the opening and ending songs re-written and performed in English by Kristine Sa. In 2005, three Suzuka soundtrack albums were released in Japan through King Records.

=== Light novel ===
A Suzuka light novel was published by Kodansha under its KC Novel label on 17 May 2007. It contained three short stories written by Ayuna Fujisaki with illustrations done by the series creator, Kōji Seo.

== Reception ==
Suzuka has been compared to other manga such as Love Hina, Maison Ikkoku, and Kimagure Orange Road since, early on, it used similar plot structure and plot devices. These comparisons became less frequent as the story developed. According to Kouji Seo, Suzuka was to be a romance story from the beginning, and he had no intention of creating a harem manga. Since the North American version is uncensored, this caused the manga to be rated "Mature" and sold in shrink wrap. Despite the amount of fan service, the manga does not focus on that element. Kouji Seo pays attention to detail which can be seen in the clothing that gives off the sensation they are made out of different material along with the reflections in the windows during the nighttime. This detail can also be seen in his characters as they all have complex personalities that make them interesting and have substance. Overall the reception of the manga has been positive.

The anime has been described as having "all the trappings of a standard high school romantic comedy series", but lacks the spirit and craftsmanship of the manga. Since the anime is a close adaptation from the manga, the criticisms of the plot are the same of it being described as generic. The anime sells "[itself] solely on the merits of character development". One effect of this character development is that some viewers will find the title character and the male lead unlikable, with complaints of lack of sympathy for both characters. The animation is considered to be ordinary with some scenes that have timing problems, look awkward, or have objects that seem oversized. The voice actors performances are considered to be mundane and sound rather flat, in both Japanese and English languages. Viewers with sensitive hearing might also pick up on the switches between mono and stereo audio in the different episodes. The sports scenes are poorly animated, and the best animated scenes include night-time scenes. The overall reception of the anime so far has been mixed.

The response to the soundtrack for the anime is somewhat mixed. Most find the music respectable, but some may detest it when it tries to be funny. The opening and ending songs that were rewritten and performed in English made those fairly close approximations of the originals and worked out better than audiences might imagine, but others still prefer the Japanese versions.
