= List of Samurai Deeper Kyo chapters =

The cover of the first volume of Samurai Deeper Kyo as published by Kodansha on October 15, 1999, in Japan.

This is a list of Samurai Deeper Kyo manga chapters.

== Volume list ==
No.	Original release date	Original ISBN	English release date	English ISBN
01	October 15, 1999	978-4-06-312749-2	June 10, 2003	978-1-59182-225-7
001. "Mibu Kyoshiro"; 002. "Demon Eyes Kyo"; 003. "Seductive Woman"; 004. "Present Danger"; 005. "Memories of Father"; Omake; Glossary
02	November 17, 1999	978-4-06-312778-2	August 12, 2003	978-1-59182-226-4
006. "Depth"; 007. "Secret Way Of the Sword"; 008. "Legendary Force"; 009. "Yuya Meets The Pickpockets"; 010. "Yuya, Not Fighting, Dancing"; 011. "Cherry Blossom And Crow"; 012. "Poison of Snake and Scorpion"; 013. "Evil Eyes Appear"; 014. "The Third One"
03	January 17, 2000	978-4-06-312794-2	October 14, 2003	978-1-59182-227-1
015. "The Plan"; 016. "Awakening"; 017. "attack of White Crow"; 018. "Cherry Blossoms In Full Bloom Flying Crow Keeps Singing Quietly"; 019. "At the End of the Mirage"; 020. "Wings Of The Tiger"; 021. "The Man Who Defeated Demon Eyes Kyo"; 022. "Genjiro-Sama"; 023. "Arriving at Edo"
04	April 14, 2000	978-4-06-312830-7	December 9, 2003	978-1-59182-249-3
024. "Spider Woman"; 025. "Battle Before the Shogun"; 026. "Ambition in the Moonlight"; 027. "The Night Before"; 028. "The Demon's Memories"; 029. "The Contest of Champions"; 030. "Loyalty and Pride"; 031. "A Winners Praise"; 032. "Three Devil Gods Descend"
05	June 16, 2000	978-4-06-312850-5	February 10, 2004	978-1-59182-249-3
033. "Death Without Honor"; 034. "Between Life and Death"; 035. "By One Step"; 036. "Black Blood"; 037. "Moonless Night"; 038. "Blind Akira"; 039. "Invitation to the Forest"; 040. "The Forest Dwellers"; 041. "The Sea of Blue Fire'"
06	August 10, 2000	978-4-06-312870-3	April 13, 2004	978-1-59182-542-5
042. "I Believe"; 043. "The Master"; 044. "Trick for a Trick"; 045. "Playing With Dolls"; 046. "Ten Minutes"; 047. "The Sleeping Dragon Roars"; 048. "Red Giant"; 049. "Behind Smile"; 050. "Child of the forest"
07	November 16, 2000	978-4-06-312903-8	June 8, 2004	978-1-59182-543-2
051. "The Demon-Blade Muramasa"; 052. "Visitor on a Dark Night"; 053. "The Biggest Dummy in the World"; 054. "Demon Eyes Defeat"; 055. "The Demons Heartbeat"; 056. "Demon Eyes Open"; 057. "Shindaras Plan"; 058. "Friends Reunited"; 059. "Rubbed the Wrong Way"
08	January 17, 2001	978-4-06-312926-7	August 10, 2004	978-1-59182-544-9
060. "A Bright and Shining Star"; 061. "The Lone Wolf"; 062. "The Man with a Scar on His back"; 063. "To the Lotus Land"; 064. "The Open Gates"; 065. "The Gatekeeper"; 066. "The Star Returns"; 067. "Battle to the Death: First Blade"; 068. "Battle to the Death: Second Blade"
09	March 16, 2001	978-4-06-312949-6	October 12, 2004	978-1-59182-545-6
069. "Third Blade"; 070. "Fourth Blade"; 071. "Fifth Blade"; 072. "Sixth Blade"; 073. "Seventh Blade"; 074. "Eighth Blade"; 075. "Ninth Blade"; 076. "Tenth Blade"
10	Mai 17, 2001	978-4-06-312970-0	December 7, 2004	978-1-59532-450-4
077. "Eleventh Blade"; 078. "Twelfth Blade... Then What?"; 079. "Meeting"; 080. "The Final Blade"; 081. "Blade's End"; 082. "Something Lost and Something Found"; 083. "The Medicine Box"; 084. "The Path Revealed"; 085. "The One-Eyed Man"
11	July 17, 2001	978-4-06-312992-2	February 8, 2005	978-1-59532-451-1
086. "Botenmaru"; 087. "The Four Emperors"; 088. "The Wanted Saint"; 089. "Assassin From the Gods"; 090. "Clan of the Gods"; Side Story: "Dragon of the Blue Sky (Part 1)"; Side Story: "Dragon of the Blue Sky (Part 2)"
12	October 17, 2001	978-4-06-313031-7	April 12, 2005	978-1-59532-452-8
091. "Dance of Swords"; 092. "Mumyosaikyo School: Water Sevensplit Dragon!"; 093. "The True Mumyojinpu School"; 094. "Shinreis Water"; 095. "The Tie that Binds"; 096. "Successor of the Mumyojinpu School"; 097. "Power of the Emperor"; 098. "Hokurakushimon"
13	December 17, 2001	978-4-06-313053-9	June 7, 2005	978-1-59532-453-5
099. "The Lions Roar"; 100. "Raikoken"; 101. "The Lightning of Loyalty"; 102. "The Long Nights End"; 103. "An Unfortunate Woman"; 104. "Firefly"; 105. "Kaho-Enbu"; 106. "Four Years Later"
14	February 15, 2002	978-4-06-313074-4	July 12, 2005	978-1-59532-454-2
107. "The Demon's Return"; 108. "Love & Peace"; 109. "The Joker"; 110. "Two Sins"; 111. "The Body"; 112. "Bearer of the Crimson Cross"; 113. "Devils in White"; 114. "Twelve Hours"
15	May 17, 2002	978-4-06-363104-3	August 9, 2005	978-1-59532-455-9
115. "Castle Town"; 116. "The color of the Heart"; 117. "Road to Hope"; 118. "The Chamber of Time"; 119. "Threads of Fate"; 120. "Laboratory of Life"; 121. "Tears"; 122. "Blood Oath"
16	July 17, 2002	978-4-06-363123-4	November 8, 2005	978-1-59532-456-6
123. "Strength and Loneliness"; 124. "The Waxing Blaze"; 125. "Attachments"; 126. "Suzaku"; 127. "Two Birds of Flame"; 128. "Paths"; 129. "The Secret of Strength"; 130. "Friends Reunited"
17	September 17, 2002	978-4-06-363145-6	February 7, 2006	978-1-59532-457-3
131. "The Resentful Dead"; 132. "Samurai Spirit"; 133. "The Ice Fortress"; 134. "Hyokenseiso"; 135. "So Far Behind"; 136. "So Far Ahead"; 137. "The Dead Can Die"; 138. "Infernos Chill"
18	November 15, 2002	978-4-06-363166-1	May 9, 2006	978-1-59532-458-0
139. "Doubt"; 140. "The Jewel's Resting Place"; 141. "The One Who Dreams"; 142. "The Third Keeper"; 143. "Rain"; 144. "Execution Game"; 145. "The Final Blow"; 146. "The Demon Enraged"
19	January 17, 2003	978-4-06-363190-6	August 8, 2006	978-1-59532-459-7
147. "End It"; 148. "Phoenix"; 149. "Mahiro's Truth"; 150. "Faith"; 151. "Fourth Watcher"; 152. "A Person"; 153. "Ashura, God Of Battle"; 154. "Compassion Vs Cruelty"
20	March 17, 2003	978-4-06-363213-2	November 7, 2006	978-1-59532-460-3
155. "Out of a Fathers Shadow"; 156. "Fifty-Fifty"; 157. "Each Man's Resolve"; 158. "Towards the Light"; 159. "Shiina Yuya's Origins"; 160. "Fugitive"; 161. "Precious Jewel"; 162. "Cremation"
21	July 17, 2003	978-4-06-363258-3	February 13, 2007	978-1-59532-461-0
163. "The Fifth and Final Gate"; 164. "The Mibu's Warrior"; 165. "Dance of Death"; 166. "Flight"; 167. "The Phoenix Rises Again"; 168. "Truth and Lies"; 169. "The One and Only"; 170. "Chain of Righteousness"
22	August 12, 2003	978-4-06-363271-2	May 8, 2007	978-1-59532-462-7
171. "Agony"; 172. "Demon"; 173. "A White Beast"; 174. "Unchained"; 175. "True Strength"; 176. "The Last of the Four Emperors"; 177. "Akari-chan"; 178. "Evil Spirits"
23	October 17, 2003	978-4-06-363296-5	July 10, 2007	978-1-59532-463-4
179. "The Four Emperors Mobilize"; 180. "Invincible"; 181. "Separate Ways"; 182. "Whirligigs"; 183. "Transformation"; 184. "A Monster Branded"; 185. "Warm Hands"; 186. "Petrification Demon"
24	December 17, 2003	978-4-06-363317-7 (normal ed.); ISBN 978-4-06-362027-6 (limited ed.)	September 11, 2007	978-1-59532-464-1
187. "The Meaning of Rage"; 188. "Impossible Reunion"; 189. "Friendship Unravels"; 190. "The Mark Of Friendship"; 191. "Sasuke Awakens"; 192. "The One Who Crosses the Sky"; 193. "Sparklers"; 194. "The Enemy Within"
25	February 17, 2004	978-4-06-363335-1	November 13, 2007	978-1-59532-465-8
195. "Secret Weapon 'The Inverted Spear'"; 196. "A Decision is Made"; 197. "Kubira's 'Dedication'"; 198. "The Disease of Death"; 199. "Passion of the Samurai"; 200. "The Correct Path"; 201. "Those That be Not Human"; 202. "Master of the Proverb"
26	April 16, 2004	978-4-06-363357-3	January 8, 2008	978-1-59532-466-5
203. "Prepare To Morph"; 204. "The Beast"; 205. "The Still Truer Samurai"; 206. "Traitor of the Flame"; 207. "The Former Crimson King"; 208. "Colored Unchangeable"; 209. "The Hero Warriors"; 210. "The Wagtail of Speed"
27	June 17, 2004	978-4-06-363395-5 (normal ed.); ISBN 978-4-06-362028-3 (limited ed.)	March 11, 2008	978-1-59532-633-1
211. "Clumsy Devotion"; 212. "The Greatest Duel to the Death"; 213. "The Samurai Theater"; 214. "Today is Stew Day"; 215. "Welcome to Onmyo Palace"; 216. "No. 13"; 217. "Lucky Brothers"; 218. "The Latrine Guard"
28	September 17, 2004	978-4-06-363424-2	May 13, 2008	978-1-59816-188-5
219. "Watcher of the Wind"; 220. "Speaking to Swords"; 221. "A False Victory"; 222. "Heaven Under Earth"; 223. "Another Pair of Crimson Eyes"; 224. "Tokito of the Four Elders"; 225. "Bontenmaru: The Man"; 226. "Waking Dream"
29	November 17, 2004	978-4-06-363447-1	July 8, 2008	978-1-59816-189-2
227. "Fourth Encounter"; 228. "The Red Heavens, The White Earth"; 229. "Someone so, so Important"; 230. "True Demon"; 231. "Dreams or Realities"; 232. "Embers of the Soul"; 233. "A Momentary Eternity"; 234. "A Four-Year Decision"
30	January 17, 2005	978-4-06-363472-3	September 9, 2008	978-1-59816-190-8
235. "The King's Proof"; 236. "Separation and Reunion"; 237. "An Unknown World"; 238. "Hotaru's Home"; 239. "Chick Bowl"; 240. "Along the Way"; 241. "Limits and Miracles; 242. "Rebellion"
31	March 17, 2005	978-4-06-363497-6 (normal ed.); ISBN 978-4-06-362040-5 (limited ed.)	November 1, 2008	978-1-59816-191-5
243. "The Height of Despair"; 244. "The Form of the Non-Form"; 245. "Spin Three Times and Bark"; 246. "Firefly Light"; 247. "An Unbreaking Soul"; 248. "A Tale of Flame"; 249. "The Final Lesson"; 250. "Love Love ☆ Trouble"
32	June 17, 2005	978-4-06-363536-2	January 1, 2009	978-1-4278-0222-4
251. "Guerrilla Hideout"; 252. "Akira All Alone"; 253. "Your Back"; 254. "The Left Blade"; 255. "Ultra-Freezing Point"; 256. "A Moment With The Holy Mother"; 257. "A Miracle of Fate"; 258. "The Distance to His Back
33	August 17, 2005	978-4-06-363560-7	March 1, 2009	978-1-4278-0223-1
259. "Animal Trail"; 260. "The Pulse of a Great Mind"; 261. "The Superior Man is Wise"; 262. "Playing Tag"; 263. "The Final Eye of the Wagtail"; 264. "Promise"; 265. "Pawn"; 266. "The Samurai"
34	October 17, 2005	978-4-06-363583-6	April 7, 2009	978-1-4278-0224-8
267. "A Fleeting Dream"; 268. "Once in Your Life"; 269. "The Guardian of Heaven"; 270. "The Rest of the Dream"; 271. "True Heart"; 272. "The True Mibu Clan"; 273. "The Battle Over the Clan"; 274. "Fighting Puppets"
35	December 16, 2005	978-4-06-363607-9	December 15, 2009	978-0-3455-2026-5
275. "Daydream"; 276.; 277.; 278.; 279.; 280.; 281.; 282.
36	February 16, 2006	978-4-06-363627-7 (normal ed.); 978-4-06-362053-5 (limited ed.)	December 15, 2009	978-0-3455-2026-5
283.; 284.; 285. "The Red Cross Knight"; 286.; 287. "Synchronization"; 288. "Yin & Yang - The Sixth Sword: Rain of Despair"; 289. "The Sanzu River"; 290. "The Power of Faith"
37	April 17, 2006	978-4-06-363653-6	June 22, 2010	978-0-3455-2155-2
291.; 292. "Remembrance"; 293.; 294.; 295. "Sins"; 296.; 297.; 298.; 299. "The Terrible God - The Fourth Sword 'Wrath of Heaven' "
38	July 14, 2006	978-4-06-363689-5	June 22, 2010	978-0-3455-2155-2
300.; 301.; 302.; 303.; 304. "The Terrible God - The Ninth Sword 'Wish' "; 305.; 306.; Last chapter: "The One who create History"; Bonus chapter
