= Code:Breaker =

Japanese manga series and its adaptations

- First tankōbon volume cover, featuring Rei Ōgami (left) and Sakura Sakurakōji (right)
- Genre: Action, supernatural
- Manga
- Written by: Akimine Kamijyo
- Published by: Kodansha
- English publisher: NA: Del Rey Manga
- Imprint: Shōnen Magazine Comics
- Magazine: Weekly Shōnen Magazine
- Original run: June 11, 2008 – July 17, 2013
- Volumes: 26
- Anime television series
- Directed by: Yasuhiro Irie
- Produced by: Katsumi Koike; Kensuke Tateishi; Motoki Mukaichi; Nobuyuki Nakamura; Yūichirō Matsuya; Eriko Aoki
- Written by: Yasuhiro Irie
- Music by: Takayuki Hattori
- Studio: Kinema Citrus
- Licensed by: Crunchyroll
- Original network: MBS, Tokyo MX, TVQ, TVA, BS11
- Original run: October 7, 2012 – December 30, 2012
- Episodes: 13 + 3 OVAs
- icon

Code:Breaker (stylized as CØDE:BREAKER) is a Japanese manga series written and illustrated by Akimine Kamijyo. It was serialized in Kodansha's shōnen manga magazine Weekly Shōnen Magazine from June 2008 to July 2013, with its chapters collected in 26 tankōbon volumes. It tells the story of a high school girl named Sakura Sakurakōji who is trained in martial arts and a male transfer student with mysterious powers named Rei Ōgami. The manga was licensed in North America by Del Rey Manga; only the first two volumes were released.

A 13-episode anime television series adaptation produced by Kinema Citrus was broadcast from October to December 2012. The series was licensed by Funimation, which produced an English dub in 2014. The series has since been licensed by Crunchyroll, following its merge with Funimation in 2021.

== Plot ==
Riding the bus one day, Sakura Sakurakōji looks out the window to see people being burned alive with a blue fire as a boy her age remains unharmed and stands over the people. When she goes back to the site the next day, there are no corpses or evidence of any kind of murder, just a small fire. When Sakura goes to class, she discovers the new transfer student is the same boy she saw the day before. Sakura soon learns that he is Rei Ōgami, the sixth "Code: Breaker," a special type of assassin with a strange ability and a member of a secret organization that serves the government.

== Media ==
=== Manga ===
Written and illustrated by Akimine Kamijyo, Code:Breaker was serialized in Kodansha's shōnen manga magazine Weekly Shōnen Magazine from June 11, 2008, to July 17, 2013. Kodansha collected its chapters in 26 tankōbon volumes, released from October 17, 2008, to September 17, 2013.

In North America, the manga was licensed for English release by Del Rey Manga; only two volumes were released on July 27 and October 26, 2010.

==== Volumes ====
No.	Original release date	Original ISBN	English release date	English ISBN
1	October 17, 2008	978-4-06-384056-8	July 27, 2010	978-0-345-52099-9
2	December 17, 2008	978-4-06-384081-0	October 26, 2010	978-0-345-52228-3
3	February 17, 2009	978-4-06-384103-9	—	—
4	April 17, 2009	978-4-06-384128-2	—	—
5	June 17, 2009	978-4-06-384150-3	—	—
6	August 17, 2009	978-4-06-384175-6	—	—
7	October 16, 2009	978-4-06-384196-1	—	—
8	December 17, 2009	978-4-06-384224-1	—	—
9	February 17, 2010	978-4-06-384249-4	—	—
10	May 17, 2010	978-4-06-384301-9	—	—
11	July 16, 2010	978-4-06-384330-9	—	—
12	October 15, 2010	978-4-06-384382-8	—	—
13	December 17, 2010	978-4-06-384419-1	—	—
14	March 17, 2011	978-4-06-384446-7	—	—
15	June 17, 2011	978-4-06-384489-4	—	—
16	October 17, 2011	978-4-06-384535-8	—	—
17	January 17, 2012	978-4-06-384599-0	—	—
18	April 17, 2012	978-4-06-384656-0	—	—
19	July 17, 2012	978-4-06-384707-9	—	—
20	September 14, 2012	978-4-06-384736-9	—	—
21	October 17, 2012	978-4-06-384750-5	—	—
22	December 17, 2012	978-4-06-384783-3	—	—
23	February 15, 2013	978-4-06-384813-7	—	—
24	April 17, 2013	978-4-06-384846-5	—	—
25	July 17, 2013	978-4-06-384877-9	—	—
26	September 17, 2013	978-4-06-394927-8	—	—

=== Anime ===
A 13-episode anime television series adaptation, produced by Kinema Citrus and directed by Yasuhiro Irie, was broadcast on MBS, Tokyo MX, TVQ, TVA and BS11 from October 7 to December 30, 2012. (Note: MBS listed the air dates for the series on Saturday at 26:58, which is effectively Sunday at 2:58 a.m. JST.) The opening theme is "Dark Shame" by Granrodeo and the ending theme is "White Crow" (シロイカラス, Shiroi Karasu) by Kenichi Suzumura. Three original animation DVD (OAD) episodes were bundled with the respective 22nd–24th limited-edition volumes of the manga, released from December 17, 2012, to April 17, 2013.

Funimation licensed the series for streaming. An English dub was produced in 2014, and released the series on home video on June 24 of the same year. The series has been since added to Crunchyroll's catalogue, following the announcement that Funimation would be unified under their brand in 2021.

==== Episodes ====
No.	Title	Original release date
1	"God's Great Judgment"; Transliteration: "Ōi naru Kami no Shinpan" (Japanese: 大いなる神の審判)	October 7, 2012
While riding the bus home one night, Sakura Sakurakōji sees a boy seemingly burning people to death with blue flames in the park. After she alerts a policeman to come with her to the park, there seems to be no trace of anything having occurred, though Sakura remains adamant in what she saw. The next day at school a new transfer student is assigned to her class and it turns out to be the same boy she saw in the park, Code:Breaker 06 Rei Ōgami. Even though she questions him, Ōgami is able to provide a sound alibi for his actions, though not convincing Sakura. After school, while lamenting the killing of a homeless man in the park by the G-Falcon street gang, Sakura meets Ōgami where they have a talk about what it means to judge the actions of criminals. The next day, while visiting a stray dog in the park, Sakura witnesses the G-Falcon gang attacking another person and intervenes. She is able to hold them off with her martial arts until getting stunned with a Taser. The dog also tries to protect Sakura, but the gang members severely injure it. Just when Sakura is about to be killed, Ōgami shows up and kills the dog, who he deemed was beyond saving, much to Sakura's horror. He then turns to the gang members and presents an ultimatum - turn themselves in or die. They then attack Ōgami, choosing the second option. Ōgami then uses his power of summoning blue flames to eradicate them all. Ōgami then walks up to the shocked Sakura and uses the flames to kill her.
2	"The Spiral Blue Flower, Blossoming in Flame"; Transliteration: "Moe Saku Rasen no Aoi Hana" (Japanese: 燃え咲く螺旋の青い花)	October 14, 2012
Sakura wakes up in her room the following morning after seemingly being killed by Ōgami. At school, Sakura grows highly cautious of Ōgami despite him acting as if nothing transpired the night before whilst among their peers. Ōgami then follows Sakura around school, which causes her to avoid her friend Aoba Takatsu in an attempt to protect her from Ōgami. Elsewhere, Code:Breaker 03 Yūki Tenpōin is given a picture of Ex-Code:Breaker 01 Hitomi as his opponent. After school Sakura draws Ōgami to a populated city square, where she tries to reason with him about killing those men the night before. However she still is not able to accept that he can commit such acts without any emotional response. Ōgami explains to her the nature of his being as a Code:Breaker, which is one who passes judgement on evildoers via means that would be considered "evil" to the rest of the world. Ōgami then tries to burn Sakura, who flees from fright. However, he does state that he will kill anyone with whom she confides his secret, causing Sakura to also make sure that he does not kill any more people by keeping an eye on him. Afterwards, Ōgami receives a call from a mysterious woman wondering why Sakura is not dead, to which Ōgami says that she is a rare person who cannot be burnt. Later, Yūki encounters Hitomi, who has the power of electricity.
3	"Angry Valor, A Graven Hammer"; Transliteration: "Ikare ru Yūki. Kizama Reru Tettsui" (Japanese: 怒れる勇気・刻まれる鉄槌)	October 21, 2012
Yūki attacks Hitomi with sound waves, but is stopped by Re-Code Agent 04 Yukihina, who has the special ability of controlling ice. Sakura goes to school with Ōgami and finds her locker stuffed with love letters from fellow students. The misunderstanding about Sakura and Ōgami's desires to observe each other leads the students to believe they are dating. Jealousy of Ōgami with Sakura turns into violence, but Sakura prevents this for fear of Ōgami using his powers. While walking to the Student Council office with Ōgami, Sakura runs into Nenene Fujiwara, who fondles Sakura's breasts. Ōgami attempts to burn Nenene, mistaking her for somebody else, but is stopped by Sakura. A mysterious boy receives a call to work with Ōgami, who later gives Sakura a puppy of the dog that tried to protect her at the park as a gift. Sakura goes with Ōgami to a local yakuza office, where he is offered a job of selling drugs. However, Ōgami kills all the yakuza members and two corrupt policemen there instead. Ōgami threatens to kill the drug victims, but is stopped by Sakura and gives them a reason to live. Ōgami goes to a car waiting outside the yakuza office with Corrupt Chief of Police Takata inside, but Ōgami gives chase when Takata attempts to flee. The mysterious boy from earlier is revealed to be Code:Breaker 04 Toki Fujiwara, who blows up the car that Takata was in with his powers of magnetism.
4	"War Cry"; Transliteration: "Kō no Koe" (Japanese: 鬨の声)	October 28, 2012
Ōgami appears before Eden, The Code:Breaker Policy Governance Board, where he is given his next job to assassinate a politician named Tabata Shigeru. Sakura wakes up in front of her house and is questioned by her parents about her recent behavior. Sakura lies to them, but her parents choose to overlook this aspect. When she comes outside of her house, she meets Toki, who walks with her to school. However, Ōgami suddenly appears and immediately begins to fight Toki, that is until Sakura stops the two. Sakura and Ōgami head to school after Toki leaves. At school, Sakura spots Toki, and she leaves class to find out what he is doing. Upon being discover by teacher Miyuki Kanda, Toki lies that he is auditing the school and is allowed to stay. During lunch, it is revealed that Toki's older sister is Nenene, exhibiting similar characteristics. Ōgami and Toki later go on a job, and Sakura accidentally ends up tagging along. Ōgami reveals Toki's power is that of controlling magnetic fields and this can move any metallic object. After breaking into a compound housing a government research facility for special abilities and dealing with the normal security guards, Ōgami and Toki engage in battle with two guards wearing large fueled backpacks, which allow them to have special abilities of wind and water.
5	"Banquet of Wishes"; Transliteration: "Negai Noutage" (Japanese: 願いのうたげ)	November 4, 2012
During the battle, the two guards are forced to retreat when their backpacks suddenly run dry, allowing Ōgami and Toki to continue with the mission. Inside the facility, Sakura learns that the Code:Breakers are a government agency run directly under the command of the Prime Minister. The facility houses kids with special abilities hooked up to machines for close monitoring, in which the lower levels of the facility are used for experiments via dissections, having their organs removed and sold and their corpses placed in large preservative jars. Tabata is revealed to be the head of the research facility. The two guards return and resume their fight with Ōgami and Toki, who both discover that the backpacks each contained a child with special abilities, who each had a younger sibling among the failed experiments. The two children finally rest in peace when Ōgami and Toki kill the guards. Just as Ōgami is about to kill Tabata, his crippled daughter Chisa Shigeru appears. It turns out that Tabata performed such experiments in order to find suitable transplants for Chisa, who also has special abilities. Sakura tries to convince Ōgami not to kill Tabata, but Ōgami has no choice but to kill Tabata, who tried to attack him with a scalpel. Chisa passes out after Ōgami goads her to take revenge on him in the future, and Toki finds out that Hitomi is the real mastermind behind the research project. The remaining children are transported to another research facility, while Chisa receives medical attention.
6	"Lost One"; Transliteration: "Rosutowan" (Japanese: ロストワン)	November 11, 2012
While Toki has lunch with the Prime Minister, who is actually his father, he is reminded that he became a Code:Breaker in order to keep his sister Nenene away from his father in order to protect her. On their way to school, Sakura and Ōgami run into Code:Breaker 05 Rui "Prince" Hachiōji, who gives Ōgami orders to protect Sakura. At school, the class is acting strangely, which causes Ōgami to suspect that Sakura has exposed his secret as a Code:Breaker. However, it turns out that the class was actually preparing a welcome party for Ōgami. At the same time, Toki is seen collapsing in pain in an alley someplace, and the Prime Minister is informed that a total of 43 agents have gone missing in search of Hitomi. Back at the party, the school is attacked by the 43 missing agents, whose dead bodies have been reanimated through the use of Hitomi's power. Ōgami momentarily collapses while fighting the dead agents. Kanda arrives to help, revealing herself as an agent of Eden assigned to Ōgami. Yūki also appears to assist them in fending off the attack. Code:Breaker 02 Masaomi Heike, a classmate of Sakura and Ōgami who habitually has tea in the most random of places, joins the fight as well and successfully defeats the agents using light manipulation. Toki is still shown collapsed in the alley, but now in the form of a child.
7	"Sakura, in the Light"; Transliteration: "Sakura, hikari no Nakani" (Japanese: 桜、光の中に)	November 18, 2012
Ōgami's collapse causes him to be in his Lost Form, a state which will last 24 hours due to the overuse of his powers. The symptoms vary for each Code:Breaker, of which Ōgami suffers from hypothermia in his case. Sakura volunteers her house as a secure location for Ōgami to recover. When Sakura bring Yūki, Heike and Kanda there, they are welcomed by her father Gōtoku Sakurakōji, head of the highly respected yakuza clan called the Kizakura. After her cosplaying mother Yuki Sakurakōji brings them to the guesthouse, it is revealed that Toki, who is already there, is in his Lost Form called age regression, which explains his childlike appearance. While Ōgami is resting, the others have a feast together. At night, Heike informs Toki that Hitomi might be targeting both Ōgami and Sakura, but has no idea why. The next morning, Rui is ordered to go to Sakura's house to provide support for both Ōgami and Toki. When Hitomi raids Sakura's house in order to kidnap Sakura, the Code:Breakers do their best to fight back against his electrical attacks. Hitomi then unleashes his full power against them, but Sakura jumps in front of his attack and is surprisingly unharmed. It turns out that Hitomi's attack was just a decoy to gather all the Code:Breakers, thus leaving an opening for Yukihina to kidnap the Prime Minister. Yūki's Lost Form is revealed to be a cat.
8	"King & Soldier, Child & House"; Transliteration: "Ou to Hei, Ko to Ie" (Japanese: 王と兵、子と家)	November 25, 2012
While the Code:Breakers discuss what their next plan of action should be, Toki leaves, uninterested in rescuing his father. As the Code:Breakers continue to discuss their plan, none except Ōgami have the convictions to kill their former leader. Toki goes to Nenene, who seems to remember him, but she suddenly reverts to her old self, unaware of who Toki is. While the Kizakura members who were injured during Hitomi's attack are being tended to their wounds, Sakura finds Ōgami looking at her family photo album. Ōgami is explained that Gōtoku and Yuki adopted Sakura as a child after finding her outside on their doorstep one night with blood splattered all over her. Meanwhile, Yūki and Rui reminisce about when Hitomi used to be good. When Toki returns, Sakura and the other Code:Breakers head out in search of Hitomi and the Prime Minister. At school, Kanda meets with several other faculty members, all of whom work for Eden as Code:Breakers supporters. Since Kanda is a former subordinate of Hitomi, the plan is for her to use any possible remaining trust to kill Hitomi. After Rui meets with Heike at a bridge, he attacks her for figuring out that he is a part of Hitomi's scheme. Yūki, as Rui tries to keep the bridge from collapsing, witnesses Heike attack her from afar. Heike then appears to Sakura and tricks her into following him, leading her directly to Hitomi's hideout with the Prime Minister taken hostage. Heike exchanges her as a gesture of good will in order to join sides with Hitomi.
9	"Stopped Time"; Transliteration: "Toma tta Jikan" (Japanese: 止まった時間)	December 2, 2012
While all the Code:Breakers receive anonymous messages detailing Hitomi's location, Hitomi tells Sakura to sit back and wait for the plan to commence, but Sakura becomes angered when Heike mentions that he reduced Rui to a bloody mess. Yūki informs Ōgami of Heike's betrayal and the two proceed to Hitomi's hideout together. While Yūki holds off Heike, Ōgami proceeds to confront Hitomi and rescue Sakura. However, Ōgami is stopped by Kanda, who is under Hitomi's electrical control, yet Sakura eventually prevents Ōgami from killing Kanda. Hitomi shows his clock collection on the wall, each stopped at a time when a former Code:Breaker was killed. Hitomi plans to execute the Prime Minister, but he first bombs the city full of civilians as a spectacle of exposing Code:Breakers, in order to recognize them as great heroes rather than dangerous outcasts. Ōgami disagrees with this cause and burns all the clocks, but as Ōgami proceeds to attack Hitomi, Yukihina arrives and intervenes, taking the Prime Minister with him. Although Ōgami is unable to do anything since his flames cannot melt Yukihina's ice, Toki arrives just in time to save Ōgami and Sakura from a barrage of ice. The hideout begins to collapse and everyone leaves. However, Sakura enters the car with Hitomi, Heike and Yukihina inside, hoping to prevent them from killing the Prime Minister.
10	"The World People See"; Transliteration: "Hito no Miru Sekai" (Japanese: 人の見る世界)	December 9, 2012
When Hitomi was sixteen years old, he was inaugurated as Code:Breaker 06, and due to his excellence at his job, he was considered a promotion. Heike was revealed as his senior at that time. Four years later, Hitomi's unnamed partner, Code:Breaker 05 at the time, was killed during an operation, and it is shown that his watch stopped working the moment he died. Heike promoted Hitomi as the new Code:Breaker 05, but Hitomi was greatly troubled by his partner's death. Six years later, being assigned to take out a terrorist coupe of supernaturals, Hitomi, as Code:Breaker 03, is distraught when the rest of his group except Hitomi died during the mission, and only the leader rogue supernatural managed to escape. Hitomi, explaining to Heike that Code:Breaker 06 at that time was killed by her own powers, requested him to investigate upon the matter. With Hitomi promoted to Code:Breaker 01, he was tasked to train the recruited Code:Breakers (Yūki, Toki, Rui and Ōgami), initiating them as Code:Breakers after their individual training sessions. However, Hitomi took concern for Ōgami's primary focus of eliminating evil without thought of any consequences. During a rescue mission with Ōgami and Toki, Hitomi is seen carrying a child, which was the real objective of the rescue mission. Hitomi later told Ōgami that their purpose should be protecting the powerless and not simply killing the wicked. On another job with the other Code:Breakers, Hitomi finally killed the leader rogue supernatural to avenge the deaths of his former comrades. Heike later informed Hitomi that the Code:Breakers could die if they overuse their own powers numerous times, which was something Eden had kept them from knowing. Although Hitomi failed to reveal this to Ōgami, he silently vowed to get revenge on Eden. In the present, Hitomi announces to the public on Sky Tower that he will kill the Prime Minister and 50,000 other civilians across Japan.
11	"50,000 Hostages"; Transliteration: "5 Man-ri no Hitojichi" (Japanese: 5万人の人質)	December 16, 2012
The Code:Breakers continue to search for Hitomi, but are unsuccessful. As bombs continue to detonate throughout Japan, the Code:Breakers, the Japanese government and the Kizakura all receive anonymous emails detailing the locations of the bombs and Hitomi being found at Sky Tower. Toki and Kanda set off to Sky Tower, while Yūki goes out to search for and disable as many bombs as he can. Ōgami arrives at Sky Tower first to rescue Sakura, but Hitomi catches him and engages him in an intense battle. Ōgami's blues flames are overwhelmed by Hitomi's electricity as a result. As Sakura manages to free herself, Hitomi reveals to them that the Prime Minister attempted to have Hitomi killed in order to prevent him from exposing the Code:Breakers. Hitomi then states his desire to make a world where people with special abilities can live happy lives freely, not as government dogs. Toki and Kanda are stopped by Heike, who faces Toki in a fierce duel. The Japan government and the Kizakura begin to isolate locations with bombs, however they are short on personnel. Yukihina proceeds to rescue all children with special abilities in the research facility, only to by met by Rui, revealed to still be alive.
12	"Devils... God and Man... Sakura Watching Over"; Transliteration: "Maō. Kami to Hito. Mimamoru Sakura" (Japanese: 魔王・神と人・見守る桜)	December 23, 2012
Toki stands on the roof of Sky Tower where the Prime Minister is held captive with twenty minutes remaining. While fighting Yukihina, Rui vows to save the children from the research facility. Meanwhile, Hitomi reveals to Ōgami, who is standing on the brink of defeat, that the people that Ōgami has killed thus far were ones that had helped Hitomi in one way or another. Ōgami denies Hitomi's offer join him, promising to protect the innocent until the very end. However, Ōgami goes into his Lost Form when he tries to attack Hitomi once more, but Sakura tries to protect him from Hitomi, who grabs her by the throat. Elsewhere, Gōtoku and some Kizakura members approach a van broadcasting the signal for detonating bombs, but two boys with special abilities exit the van and begin attacking the group. As the timer reaches to zero, no detonation occurs. This is because Yūki found and destroyed the van, thanks to Heike, who also told Yūki where the research facility housing the children is located. Yūki arrives to help Rui, but Yukihina flees. Heike confronts Hitomi, believing that the plan has been dismantled. However, Hitomi reveals that he chose Sky Tower as a last resort in order to use his powers to detonate all the bombs throughout Japan. Toki finally rescues his father after threatening to kill him. Just as Hitomi is about to play his final trump card, Sky Tower is covered in Rui's shadow ability and the rest of the Code:Breakers arrive to stop Hitomi, who continues to rationalize his cause. Ōgami then reenters the fight, removing his thumb ring, which causes his power to rise exponentially.
13	"A Flower Blooming With God"; Transliteration: "Saishū Wa Kami to Saku Hana" (Japanese: 最終話 神と咲く花)	December 30, 2012
After a quick flashback of when Ōgami had his first training session with Hitomi, Ōgami's blue flames easily absorbs Hitomi's strongest electricity blasts, resulting both of them to collapse. Hitomi is reaching his Code:End as his own powers begin to attack him. Hitomi, still wanting to continue his plan, is beaten back by Ōgami. As he lies defeated and says his last words to all the Code:Breakers, Hitomi encourages them to make themselves public as the ones who defeated him and his plot. However, the Prime Minister appears and says otherwise, which enrages Hitomi. The Code:Breakers manages to stop him from killing the Prime Minister and Hitomi finally reaches his Code:End and dies in the arms of Ōgami, who leaves after justifying that Hitomi got what he deserved. Toki overhears the public crediting the police department for disabling the bombs and killing Hitomi. Later, Heike and the Prime Minister discuss that they succeeded in having Ōgami battle Hitomi to draw out his true power, which they are curious if this power will fare against the "Seekee". They would use Sakura to be with Ōgami to extinguish his flames if ever he ever goes out of control. The Prime Minister coughs up blood when an electrical spark shocks his body. Sakura individually says farewell to Yūki, Rui and Toki, who each are assigned missions of their own, mentioning that Ōgami has already left as well. As Sakura returns to her normal life, Ōgami goes on a mission with Kanda at an airport, battling a man with the special ability of wind.
