= Akimine Kamijyo =

Japanese manga artist

- Born: September 13, 1975 (age 51) Kanagawa, Japan
- Area: Manga artist
- Notable works: Samurai Deeper Kyo; Code:Breaker

Akimine Kamijyo (上条明峰, Kamijō Akimine; born September 13, 1975) is the pen name of a Japanese manga artist. Her works include Samurai Deeper Kyo, Shirogane no Karasu (also known as Silver Crow) which started on May 30, 2007, in Weekly Shōnen Magazine. She started Code:Breaker in 2008 which was completed in 2013. She started Kobayashi Shōnen to Futei no Kaijin in 2017, as she planned from November 2016 and ended it in 2018. She has also written doujinshi under the pen name Meika Hatagashira (伯明華).

She worked as Rumiko Takahashi's assistant for two months. Then Haruko Kashiwagi's assistant.

== Works ==
- Samurai Deeper Kyo (1999–2006, serialized in Weekly Shōnen Magazine, Kodansha)
- Shirogane no Karasu (しろがねの鴉) (2007–2008, serialized in Weekly Shōnen Magazine, Kodansha)
- Code:Breaker (2008–2013, serialized in Weekly Shōnen Magazine, Kodansha)
- Tansansuibu (たんさんすいぶ) (2014–2016, serialized in Evening, Kodansha)
- Kobayashi Shōnen to Futei no Kaijin (小林少年と不逞の怪人) (2017–2018, serialized in Weekly Young Magazine, Kodansha)
- Katana Beast (獣心のカタナ, Jūshin no Katana) (2023–2024, serialized in Weekly Shōnen Magazine, Kodansha)
