= List of Code:Breaker characters =

The following is a list of characters from the manga series Code:Breaker.

== Main characters ==
=== Sakura Sakurakōji ===
Voiced by: Yōko Hikasa (Japanese); Ashly Burch (credited as Jackie Ross) (English)

Sakura Sakurakōji (桜小路 桜, Sakurakōji Sakura) is thought of as cute and helpless by boys who think they should protect her. However, she is a martial arts expert and turns down guys who ask her out based on their protective feelings because they don't know the real her. The story is told from Sakura's perspective, but her influence on the plot is bare minimal (despite her efforts).

Before the storyline, she found an old dog whose homeless owner had died a few months before the start of the story. She attempts to befriend the dog, whom she promptly names "Dog" (｢犬｣, "Inu"). Her attempts are fruitless until Ogami comes. She is immune to Ogami's fire and cannot be burned for reasons unknown which strongly draws the interest of the Code: Breaker organization leading her to be dubbed as a "Rare Kind (珍種, Chinshu)". Later through the story, she is able to dispel other Code: Breakers' abilities, leading one to believe that her ability is that she negates the abilities of others. Together with her fighting skills, this makes Sakura a formidable force against other Code: Breakers and Re-Codes. She also seems to have a superior sense of smell, able to tell the real Yuuki from the fake by her smell, telling it's Ren in a costume, and even smell someone's personality.

Sakura disagrees strongly with Ogami regarding his views on people, specifically criminals, and that they are trashes who need to die. It is later revealed that she is the daughter of the most respected head of the yakuza. After the fight with Haruto, she tells Ogami that she was adopted by her parents when he tries to find albums of her before she was 5. She was spared by Ogami because of her identity as a "rare kind". She cannot be affected by Ogami's flame at all and by hugging Kanda, she was able to cancel out Hitomi's electric mind control. She managed to completely reverse Yukihina's "Eternity Zero" although it used up all her power. Like the Code: Breakers, if she uses too much of her ability, she will revert to the size of a doll. Hitomi has hidden a key that the Re-Codes are looking for with "Puppy" (｢子犬｣, "Koinu"). After being kidnapped by "The one being Sought", she now has his tattoo on the back of her neck, something that greatly upsets Ogami. She also remembers that she met "The one being Sought" back when she was a child and gave the key to him, which means the key is originally Sakura's. She later met Inoichi in chapter 65 and in 66 when Sakura was in danger, Sakura had a flashback, remembering she knows Inoichi. And Inoichi had always protected her and always stayed by her side.

It is highly suggested in the later part of the series that there is more to her and the world of the Codes that she is unaware of, where the Code: Breakers deliberately had her leave to go on a camping trip while they fought the Re-Codes at the Shibuya Mansion.

It was also revealed in chapter 75 that "he" said that the room where Pandora'a Box was being kept (beyond the door, only accessible with the card key) was the same as it was when their mother died (Ogami and "the one being sought") and that her death was caused by Sakura and "the one being sought" also mention that Sakura's memories should be starting to come back.

In Chapter 76, it was said that the mother of Ogami and "the one being sought" died because of protecting Sakura, and Ogami, Inochi, and Hitomi were there with Sakura during that incident—meaning Ogami already met Sakura when they were younger.

In Chapter 77, it is revealed that her real father is the Student Council President. In previous chapters, he has also stated that Sakura must not realize that she is a Rare Kind, otherwise, she cannot return to a normal lifestyle. It was also stated that the Student Council President didn't want Sakura to become like himself, a non-existent person because of the power of the rare kind.

In Chapter 111, it is revealed that Sakura's real mother was one of the four founders of Eden.

In Chapters 112 onward, it appears as though Sakura unknowingly has gained a crush on Ogami. When he initiates a hug towards her for the first time to prove that he was still warm and alive, her entire face turns red. When asked, she states that it was the first time he hugged her, so she was surprised, but Ogami didn't understand why she was blushing. In Chapter 113, Sakura grabs his fingers, saying that they were warm and the Emperor should be alive. Ogami moves to hold her whole hand, and once again she inexplicably blushes and stutters. Ogami, however, thinks that it is a 'feature of the rare kind' and thinks that he should do some more tests to examine her.

It was thought that in chapter 122, when Sakura and Ogami are childhood friends, she was the one that took Ogami's arm. It was instead another Rare Kind they call "Fussy Lunch" because he is always seen eating. He had blown off Ogami's arm and Ogami slumped over Sakura, crying he couldn't protect anyone before he died.

=== 06 Rei Ōgami ===
Voiced by: Nobuhiko Okamoto (Japanese); Micah Solusod (English)

Rei Ōgami (大神 零, Ōgami Rei) is introduced as a mysterious young boy about whom not much is known. His first appearance in the manga is when Sakura sees him in the park, and immediately becomes a transfer student at her school the next day. He wears a black glove on his left hand. His part-time job is eliminating the "trash (悪人, Gomi)" of the people. He has so far eliminated a local gang called G-falcon who were attacking Sakurakouji and Dog, the local yakuza who controlled G-falcon, and a group of corrupt police officers, one of them vaguely knowing who the Code: Breakers are. He also apparently killed his parents. His Code: Breaker codename is Code: 06, stating he is the weakest of the Code: Breakers.

Ogami's left hand is capable of causing anything he touches (aside from Sakura) to combust into blue flames. However in chapter 31, it is revealed that the ring around his thumb is a limiter, where when removed he no longer needs to touch it to cause combustion and it is stated to surpass a Code: 01. He covers it with a black leather glove when he doesn't use his power, where this glove was given to him by his brother, and wears it as a reminder to kill him. It is later revealed that his arm is not his own, explaining why his firepower only comes from his left arm and not his right. In chapter 102, it is stated that he had died once while he was younger, and that the left arm he has now acts as a heart for him because it governs life and death, without it he would die. The Lost Form for Rei after using his power for extended periods causes him to have a high fever along with a lower body temperature and, like all other Code: Breakers, won't be able to use his power again until exactly 24 hours have elapsed. After the resurrection of "Code: Emperor", however, his Lost Form changes into invisibility, lasting for less than 24 hours. Ogami's left arm is not his; in fact, it belongs to the Code: Emperor. He is supposed to eliminate any witnesses to his powers, but he cannot fulfill this in Sakura's case because he cannot cause her to combust. As the story progresses, Ogami grows fond of Sakura. He became protective of her but denies it by acting cold. This grows more evident when he was willing to put on a stupid costume under the belief it would help Sakura return to normal size and became completely dissociated after Sakura was kidnapped by "The one being Sought" to where he didn't realize he came to school in his pajamas and brought canned food instead of his school books.

Ogami believes strongly in the idea behind the Code of Hammurabi, often citing the quote "Eye for eye (目には目を, Me ni wa me o), Tooth for tooth (歯には歯を, Ha ni wa ha o)" and adding on "EVIL for EVIL (悪には悪を, Aku ni wa aku o)" Ogami fulfills a role similar to an anti-hero. Although he seems uncaring towards anyone, Sakura notes that his actions contradict his words and that he wouldn't go to such lengths if he didn't truly care. This is later shown where he has a completely uncaring attitude to Lily's mercenary threats, only to react when he attempted to kill a pregnant woman. He also appears to have a hobby in swordsmanship and is quite skilled as well, able to slice through arrows while still in. He has completed studying under the student council president, strengthening his power and is currently heading to face the Re-Codes. In the fight with "The one being Sought" Ogami has memories of his life with "The one being Sought". Ogami ends up killing "The one being Sought", his brother, but had to be protected by Toki, Yuuki, and Sakura. This makes him stronger because he doesn't want his friends to get hurt for him. After defeating "The one being Sought" Ogami starts daydreaming and making models of castles. He starts staring into space as if regretting having killed his brother. He also gets a new power The Black Flame called Belphegor in chapter 104 which is strong enough to burn Yuuki's "Sound" but at a price. And his blue flame, "Satan's flame", also came at a price which was his sense of taste. In chapter 111, the emperor gives him another power called the Mammon while fighting with Heike. In chapter 121, it is revealed that he was the one that taught Sakura how to love living things, and was the one that made her to love hugging people.

In chapter 87, Ogami first meets the Emperor who appears as a small flame. Later the Emperor's form changes into that of the child form of his original self. It was revealed the reason why the Emperor's arm chose Ogami out of so many other people was because Ogami originally had the same ability as the Emperor, and as a child, he was able control it using his entire body, thus being more powerful than his current self. While they argue most of the time, Ogami and the Emperor care about each other, as shown when the Emperor dies but when they meet again in Ogami's subconsciousness, Ogami gives the Emperor a huge hug while threatening to beat him up for dying. Emperor notes that the last time they hugged was when he gave Ogami his arm. Afterwards, the Emperor fades away and tells Ogami not to die, for he is the next man worthy of being the next Emperor.

In chapter 120, when Ogami was transformed into a six-year-old child by Aoba, he was revealed to have an extremely foul and insulting mouth, calling Sakura "Doll Head", Puppy "Mopping Rag", Rui "Drunken Tomboy", Aoba "Busty Girl", Maede "Dirty Dickhead", and Uesugi "Giant Guy". His personality is much more commanding and arrogant, and he says his true thoughts without hesitation. However, he is also against killing things and cherishes the values of life. He is also extremely insightful and, while blunt, gentle; when Aoba was beating him, he told her "You're sad? You're bad, yet you look like you're about to cry. I'll help you. Don't be sad now, "Busty Girl"." He is more frank and honest about his feelings as a child and does not hesitate in showing gratitude, such as when he told Uesugi, "I don't know what all this is about, but you helped a complete stranger like me. Thanks, "Giant Guy.". When Uesugi and Puppy were injured by Aoba from protecting him, Ogami became furious and unleashed his abilities to stop her and make her apologize. He then revealed that as a child he already possessed all Seven Flames and was able to control them easily.

In chapter 136, Toki explains that Ogami has the Imperial Blood of Purgatory. He is the sole heir of the bloodline able to control the Seven Flames. Because of this, he was treated as royalty by many other power users when young, possibly explaining his arrogant attitude as a child. As Yukihina said it, "Because this is the reaper, Ogami Rei. He can even send fear quivering down the spines of those demons and stand atop them." Furthermore, Ogami is revealed to be the 'forbidden being', a hybrid child between a power user and a rare kind. Since power users and rare kinds naturally negate each other, to the point where their blood combined explodes, it is impossible to copulate, thus making Ogami an impossible existence. According to Saechika, that is the main reason why the Seven Demons listen to him.

==== The Seven Flames ====
The Seven Flames (七つの炎, Nanatsu no Honō) are Ogami's power. While most 'Special Abilities' involve the manipulation of natural phenomena, these 'Seven Flames' are of unearthly origin, something that should not even exist, and thus do not behave like or have the same limitations as natural fire. In fact, the flames are governed by and named after Seven Demons (七つの悪魔, Nanatsu no Akuma, based on Binsfeld's Seven Princes of Hell) and each embody one of the Seven Deadly Sins, being described as Seven Flames that burn away the Seven Deadly Sins (七つの大罪を燃え散らす七つの炎, Nanatsu no Taizai o moechirasu Nanatsu no Honō). In truth, the flames used to belong to Code: Emperor, whose arm has been bestowed onto Ogami and acts as the latter's heart (and which contained a fragment of Code: Emperor's soul); the flames are so dangerous that their use is considered taboo, and it is said that whoever can master them is fit to be called 'Emperor of Hell' (the lineage of whom Ogami has inherited).

Since they come with a unique colors, shapes, and effects, the 'Seven Flames' can be seen as a set of seven distinct abilities; also, given their differing and sometimes clashing natures (such that they may cancel each other out), it is important to use the flames only when appropriate for the situation at hand, and maintaining use of multiple flames at once is a considerable burden that should be avoided. In reality, Rei has never used multiple flames at the same time until he unlocked the final flame, which allowed him to finally unite all seven into a white inferno.

Each Flame requires a 'price' that Ogami must pay to wield it (in essence, Ogami must offer parts of himself to the Demons governing said Flames), though a deal can take place instead of a proper payment. While Ogami can control three flames by himself, the last four, the wildest and most unpredictable, had their original payments taken from a child-aged Ogami's dead body by the Four Founders of Eden. So far, Ogami has gotten back two payments from Heike and Sakurako.

- Satan Blaze (青色の煉獄業火(サタン・ブレイズ), Satan Bureizu, lit. "Blue-Colored Karmic Fire of Purgatory"): (Note: The kanji glossed with サタン・ブレイズ would normally be read Aoiro/Seishoku no Rengoku Gōka.) Ogami's signature flame, which he uses most often. It is a bright azure flame that can burn all matter to nothing, is inextinguishable by mundane means, emits neither sound, smell nor smoke while burning, and leaves behind no ashes. The power takes a lot out of Ogami, hence why he has opted to seal some of it with a ring under his glove, on his left hand. Also, at first, Ogami could only spawn Satan Blaze from his left hand, though he later became able to use it with his entire left arm, and was temporarily able to use it with his entire body (as in childhood). Additionally, while Ogami could initially only release the flame upon contact, he later became able to control it freely even at a distance. The price for Satan Blaze was Ogami's sense of taste, explaining why he is so passive about food. Interestingly, the Sin that Satan takes on is 'Anger', and when Ogami is extremely angry, the azure flame also grows in power.
  - Flame away. (燃え散れ。, Moechire.): Ogami's signature attack, used to dispose of those he deems deserving of punishment. He creates his intensely hot blue flame while grabbing hold of his target, surrounding and burning them away in the blaze while leaving no ashes.
  - Flame of Rebuke (咎めの炎, Togame no Honō): A curse-like technique where Ogami places his flame within someone's body, around their heart, to serve as a behavioral restriction: the flame will continue burning inside the victim until the day they die, yet do no harm unless they break a binding rule declared by Ogami; this was seen when the flame was put inside Haruto, making it so that if he ever commits a crime again, he will be burned from within by hellfire.
- Belphegor (闇色の辺獄烈火(ベルフェゴール), Berufegōru, lit. "Dark-Colored Raging Fire of Limbo"): (Note: The kanji glossed with ベルフェゴール would normally be read Anshoku no Hengoku Rekka.) A black flame capable of burning away other people's Special Powers; when fully unleashed, it enrobes Ogami like a black coat. The original price of Belphegor is unknown, but the Emperor took part of Yuuki's Sound ability for payment. The Sin Belphegor represents and burns away is 'Sloth' (with the Demon's true from being akin to a Grim Reaper).
- Mammon (二色の冥府双灯火(マモン), Mamon, lit. "Two-Colored Twin Lights of the Underworld"): (Note: The kanji glossed with マモン would normally be read Nishoku no Meifu Sōtōka.) The flame representing the Sin 'Greed'. Being the so-called Two-Colored Twin Lights of the Underworld (alt. transl. as 'Dichromatic Twin Flares of the Netherworld'), Mammon is a two-colored flame: it consists of one hot blue and another cool yellow half. Its true form are flaming twin swords called 2-Colored Twin-Sword Fire of the Underworld (２色の冥府双刀火, alt. transl. as 'Dichromatic Twin Flamberges of the Netherworld'). When they clash together, they form a giant, green-colored whirlwind capable of incinerating steel, while creating a powerful vortex in its wake that sucks foes in; Mammon is best used for multiple opponents, especially low-level henchmen. Mammon is the only flame so far which the Emperor has given Ogami for free.
- Beelzebub (無色の地獄浄火(ベルゼブブ), Beruzebubu, lit. "Colorless Pure Fire of Hell"): (Note: The kanji glossed with ベルゼブブ would normally be read Mushoku no Jigoku Jōka.) The flame representing the Sin 'Gluttony'. Beelzebub is depicted as a large fly-shaped flame that consumes everything due to its extreme hunger. Ogami cows Beelzebub into listening to him, and Beelzebub promises to work for Ogami, as long as it gets to eat Ogami's heart when he dies. Beelzebub's true form is the six-winged archangel Seraphim, the original fire-angel of judgement. Seraphim had gotten too arrogant with its power and was cast away from heaven to hell, becoming a demon. Beelzebub is the Colorless Pure Fire of Hell (alt. transl. as 'Achromatic Catharsis Flame of Purgatory'): a flame so hot that it has no color, burning at upwards of 1,500 °C (hot enough to eliminate magnetism and melt down steel). The price of Beelzebub was an enormous feather given by Heike, most likely a feather from Beelzebub's original appearance. Beelzebub's true form is "The Armor of Achromatic Flame Which No One Can See Nor Get Near To". The appearance being a cloak with the right side with wings of skulls. The abilities of this form is an invisible rain of fire that is fast enough to even burn away anything it touches, while burning faster than cellular regeneration can heal.
- Leviathan (白銀色の陰府怪火(リヴァイアサン), Rivaiasan, lit. "Silver-Colored Apparitional Fire of the Netherworld"): (Note: The kanji glossed with リヴァイアサン would normally be read Hakugin'iro no Inpu Kaika.) The flame that burns away the Sin 'Envy'. Ogami uses this flame for the first time in chapter 199 most likely given by Sakura's mother through a kiss. Leviathan in its raw form looks like a chained sea dragon whose flame is silver and has the power to sever whatever the flame touches. The true form however is that of an ice dragon that goes by the name Silver-Colored Apparition Fire of the Netherworld (alt. transl. as 'Argenteous Phantom Flame of Hades Leviathan'). The power of the flame allows Ogami to drain all heat away from an area, creating ice in its place to freeze those who are caught in the area of effect.
- Asmodeus (虹色の爆炎地獄(アスモデウス), Asumodeusu, lit. "Rainbow-Colored Explosive Flame Hell"): (Note: The kanji glossed with アスモデウス would normally be read Nijiiro no Bakuen Jigoku.) Asmodeus is the Rainbow-Colored Explosive Flame Hell (alt. transl. as "Iridescent Explosive Flame of Hell"), being the flame that represents the Sin 'Lust'. Ogami initially fails to regain this flame since the founder Zed gave the flame to Mishiru because she was a girl, but he successfully obtains it after taking possession of its demon from Kagerou. At first, Asmodeus displayed the ability to trap people inside an illusion of lust, while slowly consuming them. Its true power, however, lies in its capability of producing massive explosions of iridescent color (due to chemically reacting with the surrounding alloys). Furthermore, the sound produced by the explosion can shatter the inner ear of people with sensitive hearing, like Yuuki. In order to gain control over Asmodeus, Ogami offered his sense of smell as payment.
- Lucifer (ルシファー, Rushifā): The seventh and final flame, and a more powerful form of the Satan Blaze. Representing the Sin of 'Pride', Lucifer holds the power to subjugate and unite the other seven Demons.

== Eden ==
The mysterious organization that controls the Code: Breakers. They give orders to the Code: Breakers of corrupt politicians that need to be assassinated or people that need to be protected from assassination. Despite their need for Code: Breakers, they often refer to them as merely dogs and will get rid of them if they are no longer useful or see them as a future threat despite the fact they have done nothing wrong. It has been stated there are three people who control Eden currently, though the only one revealed so far is Fujiwara's dad.

Eden was founded during the Meiji Era 100 years ago by the Code: Emperor, Heike, Sakurakouji Sakurako, and Zed The Hero.

Prime Minister Fujiwara (藤原 総理, Fujiwara Sōrii)
Voiced by: Jōji Nakata (Japanese); Ben Phillips (English)
He is Nenene and Toki's father and the prime minister of Japan. He is also revealed to be the mastermind of Eden, making him a prime target for assassination attempts. After the One Being Sought's attack, he disappeared for a time. He later manipulated Toki into accepting the power of the "Joker". After the Angels destroyed the Eden headquarters, Fujiwara plotted to go to another plan with Pandora's Box. Saechika had warned Toki to be wary of his father, as the man ordered his daughter to fully open Pandora's Box years ago, and then used that as an excuse to order Saechika to kill Nenene; Saechika likened Fujiwara as a demon wearing a human's skin.

=== Founders of Eden ===
The founders of Eden consist of four people: Masaomi Heike, Sakurako Sakurakōji (Sakura's real mother), Zed the Hero and Code: Emperor.

Code: Emperor (コード：エンペラー, Kōdo: Enperā)
Nothing much is known at this point, except that Ogami's left arm belonged to him. He controlled the "Azure Flame", which is the strongest ability known to Eden and the Code: Breakers; its flames are said to be the souls of the dead. Ogami is the only one that can control the Emperor's powers, as anyone else that was given the arm burst into flames. He is later revealed to have sealed a piece of his soul in his arm and now appears as a small ball of fire, later appears as a boy wearing a crown. The Emperor also has a crush on Rui, but tries to hide this by stating he wants to beat her. He is known to control the seven flames which are the incarnation of the seven deadly sins.

Sakurako Sakurakōji (桜小路 桜子, Sakurakōji Sakurako)
She is the mother of Sakura and is one of the four founders of Eden along with the Emperor, Heiki and Zed The Hero. Her ability is "Life" which allows her to give life to and control puppets, as shown on how she controlled Inoichi and Kurako. Sakurako's power can also restore code numbers back to their power state instantly, as seen with Yūki and Rui when they're fighting with the undead rare kinds. She is nicknamed "The Amazon".

Code of Hammurabi: "And a Secret for a Secret"

== Code: Breakers ==
A top secret organization involved in the killing of evil people whom the law cannot bring to justice. There are only six in existence at any time. The code numbers does not necessarily indicate their strength, but indicate the time when they started working for Eden. However, Code: Breaker 01, also known as the Ace, is typically the strongest of the six. Each Code: Breaker adds their own addition to the Code of Hammurabi. Their abilities operate on a limited capacity and will have adverse effects on the body if overused, resulting in a loss of their powers for 24 hours, also called the "Lost Form". It is later revealed that Code: Breakers will eventually die from their own powers. Aside from the Ace, all the current Code: Breakers have been revealed. Code: Breakers who are extraordinarily strong are given code names instead of code numbers.

=== Code: Numbers ===
02 Masaomi Heike (平家 将臣, Heike Masaomi)
Voiced by: Subaru Kimura (Japanese); J. Michael Tatum (English)

A classmate of Sakura and Rei, and the Student Council Secretary. At first glance, it is believed he was the one orchestrating the execution of yakuza children. Soon after, he is revealed to be Code: Breaker 02 and backup for Rei and Toki. He is referred to as the "Judge" because he is in charge of evaluating the other Code: Breakers and giving them a score based on how well they finished their mission. He places a higher value on life, even those with evil power. Because of this, he prefers to eternally bind their minds to death instead of actually killing them. He has the ability to manipulate light and he utilizes this very effectively. For example, he is able to relay information from the Eden main computer to retrieve necessary data. Although he is extremely powerful, he cannot fully control his own powers, so he wears a special coat to contain them. When he takes off his coat, his body emits a shining light. Without his coat, he would lose his powers too quickly and revert to his Lost Form. It is currently unknown what his Lost Form looks like because whenever he reverts, he always wears a costume. He is shown to have extreme hatred towards Code: Breaker 05 because she used to be a Re-Code but changed sides. Despite his attitude towards her, he does end up saving her from Yukihina, whom he fought in the last great war non-stop for 3 days and nights which ended in a tie because they both reverted to their Lost Form. He softens his attitude towards Code: Breaker 05 after the battle with Re-Codes.

It is revealed in chapter 109 that Heike (along with the Emperor) is part of the founding generation of Eden and he is 100 years old and probably more powerful than the Code: Names. Despite this, he allows the Names to mistreat him. He is also often seen reading an erotic book when not fighting (this usually takes place in Sakura's and Ogami's school), and where Toki goes far enough to point this out as him being a Hentai (Pervert) or a Pedo, but Heike denying as an 'art' or either leading up to punishing him in a comical humor.

Code of Hammurabi: "And Eternal Shackles for the Wicked"
Code of Hammurabi: "And Eternal Sleep for the Dead"

Special Technique:

- Great Fantasy (グレートファンタジー, Gurēto Fantajī): Used to connect himself to a phone jack to relay and download information with his mind
- Eternal Binding of Death: Traps the enemies mind within an eternal illusion of death
- Death Reaction: Used to move fast enough to cut bullets with his whip faster than others can react
- Open the mind: Used to create a torrent of light, destroying all once he removes his jacket.

03 Yūki Tenpōin (天宝院 遊騎, Tenpōin Yūki)
Voiced by: Toshiyuki Toyonaga (Japanese); Jerry Jewell (English)

The current Code: 03. At first glance, he seems pretty calm to the point of childish but goes on a rampage if anyone even brushes him. When he's first introduced he hadn't eaten in three days, forgot where he lived, lost his wallet, gave his phone to a stranger and spent the rest of his money on a crane game. Ogami described him as the "most barbaric Code: Breaker". He speaks using Kansai-ben. Despite his violent tendencies, he genuinely rewards kindness, and apologizes by giving gifts to people. In chapter 35, he gives Sakura a stuffed animal for her genuine concern for his well-being, and in Chapter 36, he attempts to get a golden toy for Toki as compensation for beating him up, even though he didn't want it. In chapter 36, he admits that he hates Eden, but has joined the organization so that he can take it down. A major love of his is the stuffed animal named Nyanmaru. In recent, he has mistaken Sakura as the true identity of Nyanmaru when her saying reminds him of the animated character, as such he calls her Nyanmaru instead of her name. He hates Heike and unlike the others he doesn't fear him, he went so far as to pour tea on his head. He seems to have suffered a traumatic past, resulting in him becoming kind rather than evil.

His ability is the control of 'sound' which allows him to listen and identify sounds from distance, travel at the speed of sound and manipulate sound waves to attack. Like Heike, he too seems to not prefer the idea of killing, as he went out of his way to save a pregnant woman and a small child from an explosion. His addition to the Code of Hammurabi has yet to be revealed. When angered his skin turns red; when he overuses his powers, his Lost Form is a small red cat, but he still retains his rage (as well as his ability to speak and his trademark collar), attacking anyone who made fun of him in that form. In chapter 85, he has even been shown to be more bad-mouthed in his Lost Form. This form could also explain why he is so fond of the anime character Nyanmaru. When was a child, he destroyed things by accident just by speaking since he couldn't control his power. He also knows Shigure of the Re-Codes. He also refers to his friends as numbers. The Student Council President also hints in Chapter 63 that Yuuki is not currently his "Real Self".

Later it was said Yūki had a bar code on his chest, showing that he was dumped by Eden. His shirt was torn off as he was protecting others like him and Shigure (who has a bar code above his left eye). His real self has long light hair and fighting capabilities greater than Ogami's, though it was only shown briefly before he transformed back.

He sleeps in a mansion and is referred to as President (社長, Shachō) by the servants. He is actual very intelligent, graduating at the age of 12 but only because he hated studying. He runs a successful corporation that focuses around his childish ideas to create cartoon characters. However all the ones he made he believes they aren't nearly as good as Nyanmaru. He is currently staying at the Student Council President's house after his house was completely destroyed.

Code of Hammurabi: "And the Requiem of Fury for the Wicked"

Special Techniques:

- Scarlet Phoneme: Uses very high density sound waves as a shell to shelter and revitalize his body.
- Sound Life: Yuuki used this technique to pass his powers on to Ogami. It was taken away later as a payment for the flame of Belphegor by Code: Emperor.

04 Toki Fujiwara (藤原 刻, Fujiwara Toki)
Voiced by: Kenichi Suzumura (Japanese); Todd Haberkorn (English)

Another person who is a Code: Breaker. Like his sister, who is one of Sakura's schoolmates, he has heterochromia and is seen to be a chain smoker. He also appears to be one of the more recently recruited Code: Breakers, as he seems to be totally unaware of the others' abilities, and forces Rei to explain them for him. After he is introduced, it's shown that he is more sociable, lies easier, and is stronger than Rei (as he is able to grab a hold of Rei's left arm, while it's on fire, to use it to light his cigarette), and seems to know Rei's history. He is also the Code: Breaker with the most interactions with the others so far seen in the series, evident with his antagonistic relationship with Rei and somewhat fearful reverence of both Heike and Yuuki. His power has to do with magnetism, and he is able to bend metal doors, destroy electronic equipment, redirect bullets, levitate metallic objects as projectiles, and has a sonar-like sense of any metal around him and knows what metal goes where (i.e. a key to a lock). However, if he uses his powers too much, he shrinks to the size of a toddler (strongly resembling Nenene). He also has great eyesight, his sight being 8.0 out of his left eye (a different system than the 20/20 vision; 2.0 being the best eyesight a normal person can have, so a sight of 8.0 implies that his sight is 4 times better than the normal human) and 1.2 in his right, giving him the ability to snipe with hand guns. He is a student to Heisei-Gakuin High School, an elite school that Sakura wishes she could get into; however, he shows no care for it and regularly skips, stating he only goes to that school because it was the closest school to his house. Also like his sister, he enjoys groping Sakura's breasts, often smothering his face between them and touching them. He also gropes most other girls in his childish form, which Puppy bites him for. He tends to act more childishly, to the point of being immature whenever he shrinks into his younger self than usual, and has a strong tendency to be easily annoyed with Yuuki's antics. He, like Ogami, uses the Code of Hammurabi except his addition is "The Steel Hammer of Justice for Evil (悪には正義の鉄鎚を, Aku ni wa Seigi no Tettsui o)". His father is the Prime Minister and the target of Hitomi. He doesn't seem to care very much for his father, although he cares deeply for Nenene and he claims that he only saves his father because if he died then "Nenene would be all alone." Like Rei, Toki is not entirely defenseless whenever he loses his abilities, as he has displayed to be a very skilled marksman, in his child form, in chapter 40. He apparently thinks Sakura is strange based on his comments about her actions but cares for her in his own way because Sakura does the same reckless things like his sister. He became a Code: Breaker to kill the Re-Code: 03 because Nenene supposedly died (most likely losing her memories) defending him when he was a child. When he became serious he uses hydrargyrum (liquid mercury), which he can control to be as hard or flexible as he needs, and he can even make a mercury clone. Toki reveals that he gave up everything, including his family and name, for the sake of defeating the one who "killed" Nenene. He goes as far as calling Re-Code: 03 his prey, warning the other Code: Breakers not interfere. He was badly injured after challenging Kouji, Re-Code: 03, so he trained under Shibuya and is heading to protect Pandora's Box.

He fights Kouji and loses, with the latter taking him away to "The One being Sought".

It is revealed in Chapter 74 that Toki's Magnetism was not inherited from his father (who is suspected of having a power because he works for Eden) but from Nenene; she gave him half her magnetism when they were younger because she wanted him to stay her brother when he wanted to run away because he had no special power.
Later, Kouji revealed that Toki is the 'Joker' of Eden, when Eden sent stronger Code:Breakers than Toki (Heike and Yuuki) to take the Emperor's arm. In chapter 116, it is revealed that his real 'Magnetism' power was sealed away in Pandora's Box by Prime Minister Fujiwara only to be claimed by Toki again when his dad offered it to him.

Code of Hammurabi: "And the Hammer of Justice for the Wicked"

Special Techniques:

- Gauss Cannon: His most powerful attack. He gathers two large balls of scrap metal. He holds one with one arm then uses his attraction to slam the second one into his other, making his body into a connector which causes the ball he is holding to fly at incredible speeds. However, this attack has a major drawback, as the damage of slamming the ball into his arm causes major harm to said arm, making it so he could only use that attack twice without causing permanent injury to himself. With the Joker power released, he is now able to use this technique to gather and shoot several great balls of scrap metal more easily with no sign of burden to him.
- Oersted Cannon Ball: This technique was used via Earth's magnetic field which enable him to attract any metal while floating them and use them to attack opponents.
- Tesla Gatling: With the power of Geomagnetism, he is able to attract any metal in the vicinity and form it into a burst-like straight cannon strong enough to nullify Rei's third flame "Mammon"; Toki is also able to make it into a stronger version called "Dynamo Webber Vulcan".
- Rail Cannon: A Railgun-based technique and his fastest attack. Amplified with Electromagnetism, this enables him to launch several coil beyond speed of sound.

=== Code: Names ===
They are four members of the Code: Breakers whose skills are so strong they are given Names instead of Numbers. Unlike the Numbers, the Names are allowed to kill whoever they wish, such as the Closer killing innocent civilians merely because a person bumped into him. Some are even shown to possess two abilities rather than just one. It is currently unknown what purpose the Code: Names are given within Eden.

Saechika Hachiouji (八王子 冴親, Hachiōji Saechika)
His code name is Code: Closer (コード:クローザー（終末ヲ告ゲシ者）, Kōdo: Kurozā); he is Rui's brother whom she thought was dead. He has the power of Shadow like Rui, but he shapes it into wolves and shotgun-like bursts to attack, or chains and cages to bind. Like Code: Seeker, he has a second power; in this case, it is effacement, which causes everything in a perimeter around him to die by absorbing the life out of it (although Rei was able to resist enough to only be immobilized). He has shown to have an obsession with his sister, wishing to "cage" her so she would only sing for him. After his sister defeated him in Eden and told him to forsake revenge in order to live a new life, he spent much of his remaining life force defending the Code: Breakers from the Rare Kind, which shortly after resulted in him reaching Code: End, and his corpse destroyed by Kagerou.

Aoba Takatsu (高津 青葉, Takatsu Aoba)
Voiced by: Eri Sendai (Japanese); Jad Saxton (English)

Her code name is Code: Revenger (コード:リベンジャー, Kōdo: Rebenjā). Code: Revenger's existence was initially revealed in chapter 97 where she revealed her identity to Toki (but not to the readers) and offered to fix his arm. In the same chapter, Kouji mentions to Rei that one of his classmates is a Code:Name. At first it is strongly hinted that Uesugi is the Code:Name but this is proven to be false when introduces himself as a RE-Code in chapter 107. In chapter 108, Uesugi reveals the true identity of Code: Revenger in front of all her classmates (and to the readers). As a result, Aoba attacks Ogami in front of everyone and easily defeats him. Ogami initially thinks Aoba's power involves her superhuman speed and strength, Uesugi however states that Aoba has yet to use her power, meaning her superhuman physical abilities are part of her raw potential. She is strong enough to completely defeat Ogami and Uesugi without taking any damage at all and crush brick walls with her punches. Aoba's special power is later revealed to be the ability to manipulate time of an object/person that she touches. For instance, if she gets hurt she can revert her own time to a moment before she took damage, and thereby nullify the effect of the other person's attack; this is called "Time change in Object". Her second ability is "Vital Acupressure", which allows her to perform acupuncture on any object without physical contact, either shattering them or empowering people. Aoba's reason for revenge and for becoming a Code:Name can be traced back to an event where almost everyone at the church she had grown up as an orphan at was murdered. Aoba seems convinced that she saw Ogami burn down the church and everyone in it. This turns out to be true, but Ogami killed the sister that took care of Aoba to spare her the pain of being crushed by the building. In chapter 119/120, she turns Ogami into a child using her power. She does not seem to know anything about Eden's past or Ogami and also seems incredibly naive, meaning that she is more than likely merely a pawn in Eden's plot.

Shigure (時雨, Shigure)

First appears in chapter 50, a boy with glasses. He kills several people by slicing them into pieces for disrupting him while feeding kittens. He has a bar code above his left eye. He seems to know Yuuki and wants to kill him since he supposedly killed Makoto. His special power is "Ash", being able to absorb Yuuki's "Sound" and rendering Ogami's "Flame" useless and "Giga Phantom"; a power which enable him to enlarge one part of his body and his Lost Form was a rat. He is later "killed" by The One Being Sought after being deemed weak by him. However, after His death, it was revealed that the body was an Ash clone, and he took possession of the Pandora's Box himself. He later meets an unidentified man (who turns out to be Saechika) and is shown to be one of the Code: Names.

Mishiru Kokumonji (黒門寺みしる, Kokumonji Mishiru)

First appears in chapter 141, her code name is Kagerou (影炎, Kagerō) who's wearing a mask and is capable of using the 7 flames like Rei. The one raised to protect and also kill the hybrid if Rei is deemed dangerous, by hunting Rei to the edge of the world. It is revealed in chapter 154 that she is Mishiru, who is a childhood friend of Rei. It was also mentioned that she is someone who loves Rei. He also proposed to her when they were young.

=== Ex Code: Breakers ===
Ex-01 Hitomi (人見, Hitomi)
Voiced by: Shinichiro Miki (Japanese); David Matranga (English)

An Ex Code: Breaker. He is "lackadaisical and never gives a straight answer", according to Ogami. He left the organization for reasons that Ogami does not know. He is said to have strength, greatness, and intelligence. He can control electricity as his Code: Breaker power. He has been revealed to have once been Code: 01, the most powerful Code: Breaker (and the fact that when he left his position Rei became the new 06, which means the previous 02 is now the 01 etc.). He is able to control people by electrocuting certain parts of a person's brain and control them like puppets but doing this, by Rei's description, makes them unable to return to a normal state of mind. However through Sakura's Rare Kind abilities, she negates it through touch. It is hinted that Hitomi knows something about Sakura's past and powers. His overall plan is to bring the Code: Breakers out of the shadows and be recognized by the public as heroes, as he is tired at the fact that they are nothing more than teenagers being "dogs of Eden" and the fact they are cast off when no longer needed. To do this, he plans to kill 50,000 people and the Prime Minister on live national television, bringing the world to such chaos they will call out for people who will fight evil by any means necessary, that being the Code: Breakers. After his plan is thwarted by the Code: Breakers, he dies after he succumbs to his Code: End. All of the Code: Breakers promised to remember him. He had apparently stolen a key from Eden and hid it with Sakura in chapter 33 along with a phrase "The 32nd of December". He did this without her knowledge, probably as a way to get around That Guy's mind-reading ability. On an interesting note, he was part of the group that met Rei on his introduction, though it was stated he was already an Ex when Rei joined, though this could merely be that he was still on good terms with Eden at this time.

Techniques:

- Flash Over: Creates a room full of lighting
- Arc Tension: Creates electricity capable of melting steel

Ex-04 Nenene Fujiwara (藤原 寧々音, Fujiwara Nenene)
Voiced by: Yukana (Japanese); Cherami Leigh (English)

She is Toki's older sister (although she seems to look and acts younger than he is). She doesn't know that she has a brother, but it is later revealed that she was "killed" by RE-Code 03 and thus lost her memories. She is in second year and vice-president of the student council. Like her brother she has heterochromia but hides it by wearing glasses. She has a strange habit of grabbing Sakura's breasts out of nowhere (something her brother tries to do to Sakura as well), cuddling herself against them and falling asleep on them; going so far as to name them (Mii-tan for the right and Hii-tan for the left). She also appears to have a possessive attachment to them, where after hearing the rumors that Sakura is going out with Rei, she latched to her tightly and states she won't give up Hii-tan and Mii-tan. In Chapter 34, she is hinted at being the last Ex Code: Breaker; in Chapter 45, it was confirmed. She refers to Toki as Magness, based on his magnetic ability. Her addition to the Code of Hammurabi has yet been stated.

In chapter 74, it is stated that Nenene's power was magnetism, and was of such a high level (she gave half her power to Toki, but still had enough to carry on being a Code: Breaker, and for him to become a Code: Breaker), she is shown levitating several magnetic weights.

In the same chapter, she also gave half her power to Toki because he wanted to leave the house because he didn't like being there with people with powers, so Nenene gave him half her power so he would stay. Heike mentions to Toki that by doing so, Nenene gave up half of her life, thereby significantly decreasing future mission success rates. In 89, her memories come back for a short period of time thanks to the power of the Pandora's box, and she's able to have a little conversation with Toki.

== Re-Code ==
Others with powers that work against the Code: Breakers. They are led by a man described as "the one being sought". They all seem to follow the belief that "Justice is Strength". Each one of them sees absolutely no value in human life, and will kill anyone for just crossing their path. Some even find joy in killing hundreds of innocent people just to do so or even their own teammates when they are deemed no longer worthy. It is currently unknown why they have these views, but it appears it is because of the cruel actions they suffered at the hands of people because of their powers, but it is also stated one loses their soul looking into The One Being Sought's eyes, suggesting some form of mind control, it could also be because they see themselves as Gods, as they usually have God in their nickname (Rui was the God Guardian where Kouji is known as the God of Destruction). Unlike the Code: Breakers, there appears to only be four Re-Code agents though it is said that there were six of them by Sendou.

The One Being Sought (｢捜シ物｣, Sagashimono)
Voiced by: Daisuke Namikawa

Originally known as "Code: Seeker" (コード：シーカー, Kōdo: Shīkā) The one Rei is looking for is none other than Rei's brother, his identifying marking is the tattoo on the back of his right hand. After their parent's apparent death at Rei's hands (later revealed to actually have been done by himself), he had taken care of him, teaching Rei all he needed to survive. He leads other teens with powers to cause destruction and chaos with his true goal to find a key, which has been said that Hitomi stole it from Eden and put it in Sakura. This Key opens a room called Pandora's Box. If Sendou statement was true he does not care for the ones working for him, and will have them killed them when they are no longer useful. This is later proven to be true, as he kills his own Re-Codes after he got the Pandora's Box, stating he doesn't want weak people working for him. Yuuki has stated that one will lose their soul if one looks into his eyes, which could be the reason why everyone who works for him has, in a way, lost their soul. When we finally see him unmasked, he has a katana beside him while like his brother he is very skilled at using, being able to attack while not appearing to move and stating this has nothing to do with his ability. He's looking for a key and can apparently read minds. His true name has never been stated, even the Re-Code call him That Guy or The one being sought (though it has been stated by Rei that it is his current name, so none of the characters could be using their real names). After kidnapping Sakura, he returns her to the Student Council President after he came by, however appears to have made a deal with him about the key he is looking for. It was also revealed through Sakura's memories that she remembered meeting him back when she was a child and give the key to him when she was a child, though he was the same age now as the time she met him.

In Chapter 77, he reveals that his "Lost" is reverting to his former self, both in terms of his body and his heart, being stuck in his Lost Form because of the Pandora's Box. That is why he looks like a younger Ogami when he arrives at Shibuya Mansion. This revealing that he is very powerful, as up till now he has been fighting in his Lost Form. His true form is a man around his late twenties with a large scar running down his left eye to his waist. His personality also changes, becoming more vocal and even asking how his little brother has been doing, if he had a girlfriend, and if he had been eating well. He doesn't believe in 'justice' and that strength is the true "justice", believing that the strongest get to do whatever they want. He has two special powers the first is "Absolute Space", being able to add or deplete space instantaneously, the second "cell regeneration" being able to regenerate cells to heal wounds. This makes him a very difficult opponent.

He is described by Kouji as "The one who possesses two marvelous powers with high intelligence, the heart of pride which cherishes justice and respects lives... the pursuer of universal truth, "Code: Seeker"...He is the privileged being who was deemed the "Seeking One"". However, it's his insight that looks to the surrounding and movements of trivial humans, as if he's reading their minds. And his conceit, it's impossible for normal people to tell what he's thinking. His overbearing skill gave people what resembled terror. "Eden" feared him as a "yet-to-be-seen threat", and planned for his obliteration.

He finally meets his death by the hands of Rei, who thrust his inferno arm through his chest and kept it there to prevent his heart from regenerating.

=== Re-Code Agents ===
01 Zed
Also Known as "Zed the Hero", one of the founders of Eden.

05 Rui "Prince" Hachiouji (八王子 泪, Hachiōji Rui, 王子 Prince)
Voiced by: Mitsuki Saiga (Japanese); Jessica Cavanagh (English)
The current Code: 05. Rui is nicknamed Prince. At first, Sakura thought she was a man, but she is actually a woman. Rui acts very much like a tomboy but is truthfully immensely shy. She seems to know "Shibuya"'s true identity and that is why he fears her. Her ability allows her to manipulate her shadows and at the time she lost her power, she changed into a mermaid. She is very strong, headbutting Toki and the others without passing out herself (only Sakura seems to be able to perfectly put up with this habit). In the past she worked for "the one being sought" as revealed by pictures of her standing with Kouji and Yukihina. Her addition to the Code of Hammurabi is "and the punishment of death for evil".

When she was part of the Re-Code she was known as the "Shadow" user referred to as the iron wall defense by past Re-Codes, also called the God Guardian, a graceful Re-Code; She also served as Hiyori's surrogate parent, which is why in chapter 69, she only fought against her after Yuuki was injured. Though at first she answered Sakura's question about why she was a Code: Breaker with another question, she later confirms the reason was because the thing she need to protect is no longer in the Re-Codes. She also seem to know about Sakura's past when talking to the President in chapter 63. She is currently holding onto the key card. It has been commented that she is the strongest Code: Breaker, suggesting her lower number stems from her past position as a Re-Code. It is later revealed that she only joined because the Code:Seeker asked her to protect Rei, and after Rei left the Code: Breakers she returned to the Re-Codes. It is found out in chapter 88 that she is a singer for a band.

Special Technique:

- Shaei: "Fending shadow" used to protect by creating an area of shadow from all other things
- Zan-ei: "Slashing Shadow" used to attack by slicing others shadows (the damage done to the shadow becomes real).
- Empress Paradox: The ultimate form of cladding herself in both defense and offense but it eventually attacks her as she can't control it

03 Kouji (虹次, Kōji)
Kouji is highly praised for his combat skills and was the one to "kill" Nenene. He is known as scarred Re-Code: 03 and also granted title "God of destruction". When he first meets Toki, Kouji spares him because he believes that weak people aren't worthy to be killed by him. He has one power, "Void". Despite having one power, he is strong enough to fight on par with the Code:Names. It was this power that protected him from Toki's liquid mercury attack as well as the Code: Closers shadow attack. When he loses his power, Kouji transforms into a wolf. Despite his calm personality, he can go into a sadistic battle rampage when he finds a strong opponent. He also mentioned to Toki that he once made a promise to Rui before she left that he will never lose to anyone. His list form is a silent wolf.

Special Techniques:

- Vacuum: He creates a temporary vacuum around him stripping abilities that rely on air of their power.
- Crash Down: He uses air pressure that comes down and crushes his enemy.
- Aerial Wall: He uses a wall of air to protect himself.
- Kamikaze: He creates a defensive barrier
- Kamiarashi: He creates a vacuum radiating from his body, reflecting attacks back at the opponent.

04 Yukihina (雪比奈, Yukihina)
Voiced by: Kenjiro Tsuda (Japanese); Eric Vale (English)

Not much is known about Yukihina other than the fact he appears to be much stronger than Lily, as he knocked her out with one punch and takes on 3 Code: Breakers at once (though they had just gone through a lengthy battle before and Yuuki was in his cat form). He has a past with Rei with a desire to one day kill him. Through Sendou's description of the top 6 Re-Code (similar to the Code: Breakers), Yukihina appears to be Re-Code: 04. He follows "Him" because of how he does not hesitate to kill anyone, seeing as being around him it will never get "boring". His ability is described as one that can counter Rei's fire as he is able to control and create ice and snow by freezing water vapor, making him the second character that can't be burned by Rei's flame. He can also break his body down into ice. His name is a pun off his abilities, as Yuki in Japanese means Snow. It is revealed later in the series by Prince that his ability is actually State of Vapor, he can change the state of water to either gas, liquid or solid and when losing power, he turns into a female version of himself.

In chapter 71, it's revealed that he and Heike were enemies in the last great war and fought non-stop for 3 days and nights.

It is eventually revealed that Yukihina is the same age as Heike, and during a confrontation in the past he was killed. Heike then used an unknown power to bring him back to life as an immortal zombie as a form of punishment.

Special Techniques:

- Eternity Zero (永久 凍結, Etaniti Zero): Used to freeze an entire room and everyone in it.

Hiyori (日和, Hiyori)

First appears in chapter 50, a young girl who has a child-like innocence as much as a child-like cruelty, getting really excited that she won the rock-paper-scissors match that decided who got to kill everyone while promising that she will make them suffer before they die, all while keeping up her child-like personality. However, this seems to only extend to people she doesn't know. She seems to be very fond of Yukihina as whenever she sees him she is automatically latched onto him and simply hugs him for long periods of time (Yukihina in turn, seems to either ignore it and lets her or simply doesn't care).

Her parents killed themselves due to a huge debt leaving her homeless until Rui took her in and promised to protect her. Once she left, she began to hate her. Her ability is "Balloon" (Chapter 69), she is able to make her 'balloons' with "100% transmittance" so they don't have shadows, making her power Rui's opposite. She can use it in various forms including manipulate any membrane in the body like the cornea causing blindness.

It was shown that she was very close to Prince, where it was her that saved her and got her out of her shell. However, after Prince left the Re-Codes, Hiyori grew an intense hatred towards her, wishing to be the one who killed her. however, despite her loyalty to The One Being Sought, even bringing him the Key, he later kills her and Shigure after obtaining Pandora's Box, believing them to be weak. However, she is later seen alive, but still in her turtle form, with Shigure.

But because of Shigure's special power he made a replica of ash. Making it seem that "The one being Sought" killed them.

When Hiyori over uses her powers, she changes into a turtle, but still keeps the ribbons in her hair after her transformation

Special Techniques:

- Exploding Balloon: She is able to use her ability to create balloons that explode on impact/contact.
- Disguising Balloon: She is also a master of disguise using her balloons, able to take on the appearance of anyone and mimic their personalities perfectly. However, they don't smell the same as Sakura was able to tell who the real one is by scent.
- Balloon Arrow: Creates a bow and several arrows and fires them all

Hajime Uesugi (上杉 萌, Uesugi Hajime)

One of Sakura's circle of friends, it seemed that he was the Code: Revenger, but that is proven to be false in chapter 107, as he claims to be a Re-Code after he saves his friends together with Kouji, Rui and Yukihina. He stated he will take care of the Code: Revenger himself. His special power is exchange. The power allows him to exchange anything he can touch for something he has set before.

=== Divisional Members ===
Lily (リリィ, Riry)

Lily is a young coldblooded woman who shows no interest in human life, even killing all the staff in a restaurant for her mercenaries to take their place. This is later explained that it's from all of the abuse she has suffered from people because of her powers, even from her own parents who poured bleach on her. She appears to use her appearance as a weapon, regularly flirting with Rei to distract him (though to no avail). Though after being saved from Sendou by Sakura, she now appears to have gone to the good side, as she agreed to use her powers to cure the people she poisoned. Her power is called Secretion, where she is able to turn her sweat into another chemical, from poisons to acid in a liquid or gas state. By the time she lost her powers, she changed into a little Butterfly. She’s very powerful, but she is not part of the top 4 Re-Code.

Ryuuichi Sendou (仙堂竜一, Sendō Ryūichi)

He appears in chapter 41 and protects 'the one Rei is looking for' when Toki attempts to shoot him. He has exceptional reflexes and strength, able to grab bullets with only his index and middle finger, break them, and throw them back with tremendous force. He is a very well-built man with a tattoo of the word BLACKOUT across his stomach. His personality is very cold, almost killing one of his own teammates before Sakura blocked his attack, but then appeared scared when Toki revealed he was about to kill him. Toki killed him by using his powers to remove the mercury that he just breathed in outside of his body. His power is called Epithelial Manipulation, where he is able to turn his skin into other substances such as a material that is "harder than steel" as well as the pigment in his skin for camouflage. Though strong, he was not a member of the top 4 Re-Code.

Ryuuji Sendou (仙堂竜二, Sendō Ryūji)

Brother of Ryuuichi Sendou, his power is ignition, and tries to kill a powerless Toki to avenge his brother and be promoted to the Re-Code. He's killed by Prince.

== The Angels ==
The Angels are a group of powerful Rare Kinds that were subject to the events of December 32 much like Ogami and Sakura, their elimination is the true goal of the Code:Names. They hate humans believing them to be nothing more than evil, and orchestrate several events in order to test humanity's character, amongst them the publication of an online site in which people can judge the fate of criminals by pardoning them or punishing them (this resulting on death), take on revenge requests at the price of their customers lives and the release of several murderers from prison to see their actions. All the Angels have great control over their Rare Kind powers allowing them to siphon the life force of everybody around them, thus easily draining the power of the Code:Breakers turning them into their Lost Form with relative ease and also have an unparalleled level of physical prowess that far outmatches that of both the Code:Breakers and the Code:Names. Their only weakness is a certain spot on their bodies, that when touched, drastically reduces their physical performance.

Fussy Lunch The Rare Kind who was really responsible for cutting off Ogami's arm. He's the leader of the Angels and seemingly the most powerful of them. He was a childhood friend of Ogami until the events of December 32. Currently he's after Prime Minister Fujiwara who holds Pandora's Box.

Reggae Four-Eyes A bespectacled Angel. Due to the power of Zed the Hero, he's revived after the events of December 32, turning him immortal until his life force is returned to him. He orchestrates the liberation of several inmates that once released, started committing several crimes that the Code:Breakers had to stop. After the vast majority of the murdered was killed by Ogami, after admitting that they would not stop their criminal activities, Four-Eyes kills a sole survivor that was willing to turn himself in, prompting a battle with Ogami. Devoted to the core to Fussy Lunch, this becomes his downfall after Ogami preys on his envy of Fussy Lunch taking more interest on Ogami than him, which causes the demon Leviathan to devour his envy and encase him in solid-ice.

Cool Yankee A delinquent-looking Angel. Due to the power of Zed the Hero, he's revived after the events of December 32, turning him immortal until his life force is returned to him. During the festival event at Ogami's school, he is faced by Toki on an obstacle race where he's provoked by Toki in order to discover his weak point. He, along with Cat Boy, offer a revenge service at their customers behest by murdering their target of hatred at the price of the customers lives. He once more encounters Toki in his child form, and the two battle with Yankee being overwhelmed by Toki's magnetized bullets. He reveals to Toki that Nenene was never her sibling and was just a pawn used by Eden in order to balance Toki's strong magnetism powers by having the brothers exchange one of their eyes. Seemingly overwhelmed Toki reveals that he knew the truth ever since he fought his Greed. Passing the life force of Cool Yankee that he received from Zed, Toki manages to kill Yankee by using his Rail Cannon, piercing him with several coils.

Cat Boy An angel that has a Cat-eared haircut. Due to the power of Zed the Hero, he's revived after the events of December 32, turning him immortal until his life force is returned to him. He, along with Cool Yankee, start taking on revenge requests to kill targets of hatred as per their customers request but at the price of their lives. He along with Franken attack Rui and Yuuki who are on Lost Form. He explains to them that Prime Minister Fujiwara was the mastermind of December 32 in order to acquire the power of Negation. As he attacks Yuuki after a provocation, he's split by Rui using Sakurako's sword turning him into two de-powered small versions of himself. After Franken is defeated he tried to strangle Rui using wires despite the difference of size. Rui manages to return his life back to him and as a result of this, his body begins to crumble due to a large strain.

Franken The largest of the Angels. Due to the power of Zed the Hero, he's revived after the events of December 32, turning him immortal until his life force is returned to him. He, along with Cat Boy, attacks Rui and Yuuki in order to kill them. After nearly killing Rui, he's faced by the robots of Sakurako which he easily destroys. He's then faced by Yuuki who returns to his normal form and transforms using his Voice of Life, with which he discovers Franken's Vital Spot, returning his life force back to him and then attacking him viciously until his death.

== Others ==
Goutoku Sakurakouji (桜小路 剛徳, Sakurakōji Gōtoku)
Voiced by: Kōji Tsujitani (Japanese); Sonny Strait (English)

Nicknamed "The Raging Dragon of the East", Sakura's adoptive father is the highly respected head of a yakuza said to fight the strong to protect the weak. He is revealed to be an ill man who gets nosebleeds when excited but loves his adoptive daughter dearly and wishes for her to remain untainted by the world. When he first met Rei, he easily sees through Rei's smiling mask and warns him that if anything were to happen to Sakura, he would be next.

Yuki Sakurakouji (桜小路 ゆき, Sakurakōji Yuki)
Voiced by: Kyoko Hikami (Japanese); Morgan Garrett (English)

Sakura's adoptive mother has the appearance of a grade schooler, which is why she was mistook as Sakura's younger sister. She likes to cosplay, always dressing up in different attires and having a closet full of different outfits. Despite her appearance, she is shown to have a violent side after consuming alcohol. Rei describes her as "being blind in love for her children" because she has taken pictures of every memorial moment of her adoptive daughter (from her first day of school to the first time she ate wasabi). Ironically, she whines that she should have taken more.

Miyuki Kanda (神田 美幸, Kanda Miyuki)
Voiced by: Yūko Kaida (Japanese); Lydia Mackay (English)

A clumsy and ditzy teacher that also happens to be an agent of Eden, serving as Rei's assistant and refers to him as her "my master". It is unsure as to why she calls him that but she protects Rei when he loses his powers. She is shown to be highly proficient with throwing weapons and firearms. In chapter 34, it is revealed that her parents were killed by robbers and Hitomi saved her life. She decided to work for Eden because she wanted to be just like him.

Haruto (春人, Haruto)

A one arm skilled ninja assassin with the ability to hypnotize his targets through sight or sound. He lost his arm in a previous encounter with Rei, where he cut off her own arm to escape Rei's blue flame. This is the only time where he failed to assassinate his target. It is implied that he changed his ways after Sakura saved his life by hugging his to extinguish Rei's blue flame. however, he later returns being contracted to take Rei's left arm for a large amount of money, he was also given a new ability by the Pandora's Box that allowed him to absorb metal and form a weaponized replacement arm. It was later revealed he was trying to get that money to be able to take care of the children that were with him. After Rei made himself look like the bad guy, Haruto was able to leave with the children who were able to still see him as their hero. Rei before doing so, used his ability to implant his fire inside Haruto, so if he ever did anything evil again he would burn in flames, claiming that death was too good for trash like him and telling him to live, mirroring Code: Seeker's final words to Rei. However, Haruto is immediately attacked by Saechika for failing to retrieve Rei's arm, although Shibuya intervened before anybody could die. Shibuya later claimed to have taken Haruto and the children he watches to a safe place.

Shibuya (渋谷, Shibuya) aka Student Council President

An odd guy who is always dressed in a Nyanmaru costume, claiming he is Nyanmaru even though they pointed out to him there is a zipper on his back. He is the only other confirmed "Rare Kind". Like Sakura, he has the ability to nullify other powers and is assumed to be immortal. With his help, Sakura was able to return to her normal size after using up all her powers. He has remained neutral in the war between Code: Breakers and Re-Codes. Because of his neutral stance, he is well acquainted with both sides and was able to retrieve Sakura from the Re-Code hideout. In the past, Shibuya trained Hitomi and Rei's brother. He lives in an old house that was originally designed as a training center for Code: Breakers. His costume is there to prevent triggering Sakura's memories. He was seriously wounded in the battle with Rei's brother. In order to open the Pandora's Box, Rei's brother needed "Rare Kind" blood and did so by thrusting a blade into Shibuya. However, he survived because he shifted his body in his suit. It is revealed that Shibuya is Sakura's real father and that he gave her up in hopes that she would not become a "non-existent" and lead a normal life.

Inoichi (ゐの壱, Inoichi)

A mechanical doll that was created in order to protect Sakura. When Inoichi protected Sakura in chapter 66, Sakura suddenly had a flashback, knowing that Inoichi had protected her in the past. Sakura also remembers that Inoichi always stay by her side when she sleeps and Sakura always sits on her lap when she was a young girl.
