= Samurai Deeper Kyo =

Japanese manga series

- First tankōbon volume cover, featuring Mibu Kyoshiro (front) and Shiina Yuya (back)
- Genre: Adventure; Historical fantasy; Martial arts
- Manga
- Written by: Akimine Kamijyo
- Published by: Kodansha
- English publisher: NA: Tokyopop; Del Rey Manga
- Magazine: Weekly Shōnen Magazine
- Original run: May 25, 1999 – May 10, 2006
- Volumes: 38
- Anime television series
- Directed by: Junji Nishimura
- Written by: Shō Aikawa
- Studio: Studio Deen
- Licensed by: NA: Media Blasters
- Original network: TV Tokyo
- English network: US: Encore Wam
- Original run: July 2, 2002 – December 24, 2002
- Episodes: 26
- Video game
- Publisher: Bandai
- Genre: Fighting
- Platform: PlayStation
- Released: JP: December 12, 2002
- Video game
- Developer: Marvelous Entertainment
- Publisher: Bandai; Bold Games/Media Blasters (USA)
- Genre: Action
- Platform: Game Boy Advance
- Released: JP: December 27, 2002; NA: February 12, 2008
- icon

Samurai Deeper Kyo (stylized in all caps) is a Japanese manga series written and illustrated by Akimine Kamijyo. It was serialized in Kodansha's shōnen manga magazine Weekly Shōnen Magazine from May 1999 to May 2006, with its chapters collected in 38 tankōbon volumes. Set during the Edo period, the series follows Demon Eyes Kyo, a feared samurai seeking to regain his body after his soul is sealed inside the body of his rival, Kyoshiro Mibu. Demon Eyes Kyo is joined in his search by the bounty hunter named Yuya Shiina, the heir to the Tokugawa shogunate named Benitora and a known rival of the Tokugawa shogunate named Yukimura Sanada. The manga was licensed in North America by Tokyopop (vol. 1–34) and Del Rey Manga (vol. 35–38; released in two omnibus volumes).

A 26-episode anime television series produced by Studio Deen was broadcast on TV Tokyo from July to December 2002. The series was licensed by Media Blasters and released on home video under its AnimeWorks label in 2003–04. It was broadcast in the United States on Encore Wam in 2006.

== Plot ==
Set in Edo period, Yuya Shiina, a bounty hunter, is searching for her brother's murderer. However, Yuya quickly meets a medicine peddler named Kyoshiro Mibu, who turns out to be sharing a body with the feared samurai Demon Eyes Kyo. The only wish Demon Eyes Kyo has is to regain his own body. Following this path leads Demon Eyes Kyo, Yuya and a variety of fellow travelers into conflict with both the Tokugawa shogunate and the Mibu Clan, a race of violent superhumans who have run Japan from the shadows for millennia.

== Characters ==
Demon Eyes Kyo (鬼目の狂, Oni Me no Kyō)
Voiced by: Katsuyuki Konishi (Japanese); Dan Green (English)
A fearsome samurai renowned for his demonic blood-red eyes. Wielding the legendary ōdachi, the Tenrō (Heavenly Wolf), forged by the master swordsmith Muramasa, he is an icy, undefeated warrior. As a child, he was shunned by the Mibu Clan for his crimson gaze—except by the Sendai Aka no Ou (Former Crimson King). After assassinating Nobunaga Oda, Demon Eyes Kyo was imprisoned in the Mibu dungeons until Muramasa freed him and trained him in Mumyo Jinpu Ryuu. Now the last True Mibu, Demon Eyes Kyo was tasked by the Sendai Aka no Ou to explore the outside world—and to stop the former king should he ever turn to evil and threaten destruction.
Kyoshiro Mibu (壬生 京四郎, Mibu Kyōshirō)
Voiced by: Katsuyuki Konishi (Japanese); Dan Green (English)
A formidable and enigmatic swordsman, he stands as Demon Eyes Kyo's only true rival. Wielding the cursed Shibien (Black Sword)—one of Muramasa's legendary blades—he is revealed to be an heir to the Aka no Ou throne, his crimson eyes marking his Mibu lineage. Though he is a "Red Cross Knight", forged from the flesh of the Sendai Aka no Ou, he is not a True Mibu—merely an advanced battle doll, surpassing even the first generation in power. For most of the manga, Kyoshiro's strength eclipses that of Demon Eyes Kyo, until the final confrontation tips the scales.
Yuya Shiina (椎名 ゆや, Shiina Yuya)
Voiced by: Yui Horie (Japanese); Veronica Taylor (English)
A skilled and determined warrior, Yuya hunts bounties to track down her brother's killer—the "Man with the Scar on His Back". Armed with a triple-barreled pistol and concealed daggers, she relies on cunning and precision rather than supernatural power. Though raised as Nozomu's adoptive sister, she is an orphan with no blood ties to the Mibu Clan. Unlike most warriors in her world, she possesses no extraordinary abilities—yet the Former Crimson King later suspects she may hold a latent gift for foresight.
Benitora (红虎)
Voiced by: Toshihiko Seki (Japanese); Wayne Grayson (English)
Also known as Hidetada Tokugawa (德川秀忠), he is the heir to the Tokugawa shogunate, and is also known as "The Shadow Master" for his ability to create multiple copies of himself. He first appears alongside White Crow and later challenges Kyoshiro—mistaking him for Demon Eyes Kyo—but loses the fight and subsequently joins their group. Though he quickly develops romantic feelings for Yuya, his affections are unrequited.
Yukimura Sanada (真田 幸村, Sanada Yukimura)
Voiced by: Megumi Ogata (Japanese); Christopher Kromer (English)
A renowned general who lost the Battle of Sekigahara—and with it, Japan itself. After escaping Kudoyama, he plotted to assassinate Ieyasu Tokugawa, though the plan was never executed. Now, Yukimura joins Demon Eyes Kyo in his quest to destroy the Mibu Clan and Nobunaga Oda, hoping to liberate Japan from their shadow rule and seize power for himself.
Mibu Clan (壬生一族, Mibu Ichizoku)
The Mibu Clan is ruled by The Crimson King. Most members appear humanoid but possess extraordinary strength, agility, and longevity. Lower-ranked Mibu often exhibit grotesque mutations—such as third eyes or clawed hands—due to experiments fusing humans and animals, as natural reproduction has ceased for unknown reasons. Renowned for their advanced science and technology, the Mibu have secretly manipulated Japan's history by aiding successive shoguns. However, when Ieyasu Tokugawa rebels against them, they abandon subterfuge and seize direct control. Nearly all present-day Mibu are battle dolls—artificial constructs created by the now-extinct True Mibu, save for Demon Eyes Kyo, the last surviving pureblood. The True Mibu's civil wars for supremacy ultimately led to their self-destruction, leaving only flawed replicas behind. These battle dolls now face extinction due to the Death Disease, an inherent defect in their design. Kyoshiro and Chinmei are enhanced battle dolls, crafted by the original Aka no Ou ("Crimson King"). Dubbed "Sons of the God", they surpass ordinary constructs but remain inferior to True Mibu—and will eventually succumb to the Death Disease.

== Media ==
=== Manga ===
Written and illustrated by Akimine Kamijyo, Samurai Deeper Kyo was serialized in Kodansha's shōnen manga magazine Weekly Shōnen Magazine from May 25, 1999, (Note: The series started in the magazine's 26th issue of 1999 (cover date June 9), released on May 25 of the same year.) to May 10, 2006. (Note: It finished in the magazine's 23rd issue of 2006 (cover date May 24), released on May 10 of the same year.) Kodansha collected its chapters in 38 tankōbon volumes, released from October 15, 1999, to July 14, 2006.

In North America, the manga was first licensed for English release by Tokyopop; they released 34 volumes from June 10, 2003, to April 7, 2009. In August 2009, Tokyopop announced that their manga licensing contracts with Kodansha had expired. The series was then acquired by Del Rey Manga; the remaining chapters were released in two omnibus volumes; volume 35/36 was released on December 15, 2009, and volume 37/38 was released on July 27, 2010.

=== Anime ===
A 26-episode anime television series produced by Studio Deen, directed by Junji Nishimura with screenplay by Shō Aikawa, was broadcast on TV Tokyo from July 2 to December 24, 2002. The opening and ending themes, "Aoi no Requiem" (青のレクイエム; "Blue Requiem") and "Love Deeper", respectively, are both performed by Yuiko Tsubokura.

The series was licensed in North America by Media Blasters. They released it on six DVD sets, under their AnimeWorks label, from June 24, 2003, to May 11, 2004. A complete box set was released on November 16, 2004. The series premiered in the United States on Encore Wam on July 31, 2006.

==== Episodes ====
No.	Title	Original release date	English air date
1	"Road to Armageddon" "Arumagedon no Yukue" (アルマゲドンの行方)	July 2, 2002	July 31, 2006
During the Battle of Sekigahara, Demon Eyes Kyo and Kyoshiro Mibu face off in a duel on the foggy battlefield. They are briefly interrupted by a general sent by Lady Sakuya from Kudoyama named Lord Yukimura Sanada, who has his apprentice Sasuke Sarutobi and servant Saizo Kirigakure keep Demon Eyes Kyo distracted. As a meteor suddenly enters the atmosphere, Yukimura, Sasuke and Saizo retreat, while Demon Eyes Kyo and Kyoshiro are hit upon impact. Four years later, Demon Eyes Kyo has a bounty on his head. After Yukimura and Sakuya learn from Sasuke and Saizo that Kyoshiro is alive and has been located on the Nikkō Kaidō posing as a medicine peddler, Yukimura and Sasuke travel to the Nikkō Kaidō. Kyoshiro encounters bounty hunter Yuya Shiina, who faked an illness to get close to him. Yuya captures Kyoshiro, accusing him of being an lowly outlaw. However, they are attacked by a demon snake named Jimon. This reawakens Kyoshiro as Demon Eyes Kyo, while Yukimura and Sasuke realize that the soul of Demon Eyes Kyo is bound to the body of Kyoshiro. Yukimura then reunites Demon Eyes Kyo with his ōdachi called the Tenrō.
2	"Wanted Dead or Alive" "Shoukinkubi (Deddo Oa Araibu) no Otoko" (賞金首（デッド オア アライブ）の男)	July 9, 2002	August 1, 2006
As a Eastern Army soldier who first encountered Demon Eyes Kyo during the Battle of Sekigahara, Jimon transformed into a demon snake after the meteor struck the battlefield. Yukimura informs Yuya and Sasuke that a breed of demonic monsters called Kenyo started appearing since then. Jimon uses his tail as a shield, though Demon Eyes Kyo unlocks the true power of the Tenrō to stealthily slice Jimon into pieces. After ordering Sasuke to stay behind in the woodlands, Yukimura sends maid Kosuke Anayama to look after Sakuya, while Yukimura goes with Saizo from Kudoyama to Edo. As Demon Eyes Kyo reverts to Kyoshiro, Yuya willingly follows him despite the risks. In a forest, Kyoshiro and Yuya bump into a seductive woman named Okuni of Izumo. Okuni believes that there might be hidden treasure somewhere in a nearby village, home to the Western Army soldiers who fled from the Battle of Sekigahara. Kyoshiro, Yuya and Okuni run away from approaching wild dogs towards the village. Kyoshiro and Yuya meet Mika, who sees her father as a disgrace. A group of assassins called the Sansai Shū gather together, revealing Okuni as their informant with the wild dogs under her control.
3	"Red Mirage" "Akaki Miraajyu" (紅きミラージュ)	July 16, 2002	August 2, 2006
Kyoshiro retreats to the forest and lures Kurosasori, armed with poisonous steel needles, away from the village. Armed with his barred yari called the Koyoku, Benitora comes out of hiding and chops down a tree to shield Kyoshiro before easily killing Kurosasori. Benitora expresses his desire to leave the Sansai Shū. Meanwhile, the Sansai Shū head Kitoh Genma learns that Okuni lured Kyoshiro and Yuya to the village by using the hidden treasure as a ploy. Mika's father takes Kyoshiro, Yuya and Benitora to a hut, explaining that the Sansai Shū has taken control of the village. Bringing Genma and Shirogarasu outside the hut at night, Mika admits that she made a pact with the Sansai Shū for a better life outside the village. After Okuni says that Demon Eyes Kyo has a cross-shaped scar on his back, Kyoshiro reawakens as Demon Eyes Kyo and faces Shirogarasu, who momentarily surrounds Demon Eyes Kyo in a realm of cherry blossoms. However, Demon Eyes Kyo manages to eradicate Shirogarasu. Having finally witnessed Demon Eyes Kyo for herself, Okuni effortlessly mutilates Genma with her iron strings. Okuni shockingly reveals that Demon Eyes Kyo was defeated by Kyoshiro during the Battle of Sekigahara.
4	"The Creeping Nightmare" "Shinobiyoru Naitomea" (忍び寄るナイトメア)	July 23, 2002	August 3, 2006
After Okuni vanishes, Yuya and Benitora learn from a fully reawakened Demon Eyes Kyo that Kyoshiro betrayed him and sealed his body somewhere. During a meeting, Ieyasu Tokugawa wants to host the Shogun's Tournament in Edo for samurai from many clans, but Hanzō Hattori, leader of the Iga Ninja, is against this course of action since this would endanger Tokugawa. Yukimura briefly encounters Demon Eyes Kyo on the way to Edo. Genza of the Darkness, captain of the Negoro Group, ignores Hanzō's orders to report any threat of Tokugawa being harmed, commanding the Negoro Group to eliminate potential threats and planning to take the full blame for it. Demon Eyes Kyo, Yuya and Benitora arrive in Edo, where Yukimura invites Demon Eyes Kyo to participate in the Shogun's Tournament in exchange for helping him find what he is looking for. While enjoying the night air, Demon Eyes Kyo saves Yuya from being bitten by a poisonous spider discreetly planted by Mahiro, Genza's female subordinate. Later using her secret technique to control Yuya and her spiderwebs to immobilize Demon Eyes Kyo, Mahiro forces Yuya to aim her triple-barreled pistol at Demon Eyes Kyo.
5	"Tears of the Assassin" "Asashin no Namida" (アサシンの涙)	July 30, 2002	August 4, 2006
The gunshot barely misses Demon Eyes Kyo, who breaks free from the spiderwebs and manages to save Yuya from being controlled, much to Mahiro's surprise. Before departing, Mahiro resents Demon Eyes Kyo for killing her sister Mayumi in the past. Mahiro reports back to Genza, who bestows her the honor of finishing off Demon Eyes Kyo. Yuya and Benitora watch in awe as Demon Eyes Kyo and Yukimura happily defend themselves against being attacked by the Negoro Group. Demon Eyes Kyo is lured and trapped by Genza in a field, where Mahiro prepares to fight Demon Eyes Kyo within a spiderweb cage. However, Mahiro is caught off guard when Genza sets off explosives that temporarily disables her. Mahiro is further shocked that Demon Eyes Kyo was forced to kill Mayumi in order to escape her bind from Genza and protect the Tenrō. When Mahiro begs for her life to be taken in the same manner, Demon Eyes Kyo saves her instead and unlocks the true power of the Tenrō to stealthily kill Genza. Secretly the heir to the Tokugawa Clan named Hidetada Tokugawa, Benitora warns Mahiro to stay away from Demon Eyes Kyo and Yuya for her safety.
6	"The Duel at Hibiya Bay" "Hibiya Bei no Kettou" (ヒビヤ・ベイの決闘)	August 6, 2002	Not aired
Demon Eyes Kyo, Yuya, Benitora and Yukimura briefly chance upon a mysterious man named Migeira. It is shown that Migeira's right arm responds to the resonance of the Tenrō. After Migeira leaves, it is surmised that he will be participating in the Shogun's Tournament. Demon Eyes Kyo, Yuya, Benitora and Yukimura find themselves at the Kozukappara execution grounds. Kosuke tells Sakuya that the grand champion of the Shogun's Tournament will receive a yari called the Hokuraku Shimon, while it is shown that Mahiro now serves under Hanzō. Teacher of the Ono-ha Ittō swordsmanship style Tenzen Mikogami announces the rules of the Shogun's Tournament to the contestants. At the Nippon Budokan, Demon Eyes Kyo easily wins the opening matches during the first round, while Benitora also advances to the second round. Mikogami notifies Benitora that he will be fighting Demon Eyes Kyo in the second round. At Hibiya Bay near Ueda Castle, Yukimura cross-dresses in a kimono as a disguise to participate in the second round, while Demon Eyes Kyo and Benitora prepare for their duel.
7	"Keichou Era Battle Royal" "Keichou Batoru Roiyaru" (慶長バトルロイヤル)	August 13, 2002	Not aired
Both Jyukamen and Migeira win their duels in the second round. Yukimura defeats Shigetaka Togo during their match. As Demon Eyes Kyo sees through Benitora's shadow cloning technique, Benitora manages to overcome Demon Eyes Kyo's red mirage technique. However, Benitora is disqualified for using Koyoku instead of a wooden weapon. Saizo brings Togo to Yukimura to the other side of Hibiya Bay on Edomai Island, which is free from government rule. Yukimura initially suspected that Hanzō was drugging and kidnapping the losers of the Shogun's Tournament, but this is not the case. Migeira explains to Demon Eyes Kyo that there are five truly cursed weapons forged by the master swordsmith Muramasa, in which the Tenrō and the Hokuraku Shimon are two of them. Yukimura reveals to Demon Eyes Kyo that he wants to assassinate Ieyasu in order for war to be declared, which would give Yukimura a shot at being the new shogun. During their fight in the semifinal round, Yukimura reveals Jyukamen as Nobuyuki Sanada, Yukimura's older brother. Benitora tells Yuya that Yukimura and Nobuyuki fought on opposite sides during the Battle of Sekigahara, in which Nobuyuki recalls his time fighting alongside Hidetada back then.
8	"Demon Spear Cries" "Demon Supia Naku" (デモンスピア哭く)	August 20, 2002	Not aired
Nobuyuki strikes Yukimura and call him pompous for his ambition to restore their family name. When Demon Eyes Kyo prepares to walk away from watching the match, Yukimura slashes Nobuyuki, who praises Yukimura for his undying tenacity. An irritated Ieyasu orders his troops to target Yukimura and Nobuyuki, but Demon Eyes Kyo stealthily takes out the troops, revealed to be Kenyo. Suddenly, Ueda Castle begins to shake, and Hanzō figures out that Ieyasu captured the losers of the Shogun's Tournament, turning them into Kenyo. A young girl named Santera, a member of the Jūnishinshō serving under Ieyasu, emits a purple powder that immobilizes Hanzō. Ieyasu and Santera watch as Migeira uses the Hashagō, a five-barreled gun attached to his right arm, to destroy the door of the underground vault containing the Hokuraku Shimon. Demon Eyes Kyo, Yukimura and Benitora leave Yuya to look after Nobuyuki before catching up to Migeira outside the vault. Having been controlling Ieyasu this whole time, Santera emits the purple powder in the surrounding area. Advised by Migeira, Benitora accepts his family name and manages to wield the Hokuraku Shimon, being forced to kill Ieyasu in order to release him from being bound to Santera.
9	"The Blind Smile" "Hohoemi no Burando" (微笑のブラインド)	August 27, 2002	Not aired
Yuya and Saizo head to the underground lair, while Hanzō and Mahiro learn from Yukimura that Ieyasu is dead. When the underground lair starts flooding, Migeira drains the water by blasting a hole through the cliff. On the shore, Demon Eyes Kyo and Yukimura prepare to duel, but they are intervened by Migeira, who reveals that he needs to collect all five cursed weapons forged by Muramasa in order to return the world to its original form. However, Migeira leaves in disgust when Demon Eyes Kyo simply desires to reclaim his body so he can kill Kyoshiro himself. Benitora orders Hanzō to pose as Ieyasu and bury Hibiya Bay. After Yukimura and Saizo take their leave, Yuya chances upon a blind man named Akira at an inn. At a bar, Demon Eyes Kyo tells Okuni that his sealed body is located deep inside Aokigahara, according to Yukimura. Formerly acquainted with Demon Eyes Kyo, Akira is revealed as a member of the Jūnishinshō. After easily defeating Benitora by copying his shadow cloning technique, Akira tells Yuya that Demon Eyes Kyo knows about the man with the cross-shaped scar on his back. Akira then leaves with the other members of the Jūnishinshō.
10	"Cold Blood Illusion" "Reiketsu no Iryuujyon" (冷血のイリュージョン)	September 3, 2002	August 12, 2006
The members of the Jūnishinshō travel to Aokigahara, making preparations to resurrect His Majesty, Nobunaga Oda. Meanwhile, Demon Eyes Kyo, Yuya, Benitora and Okuni arrive at an inn for the night. Demon Eyes Kyo is targeted by a member of the Jūnishinshō named Kubira, who can replicate anyone's appearance and abilities in the form of dolls. Yuya shockingly realizes that Demon Eyes Kyo has a cross-shaped scar on his back, though Demon Eyes Kyo says that he is not the one responsible for killing her brother. While putting on a Noh performance, Kubira forces Demon Eyes Kyo to fight dolls of himself. Demon Eyes Kyo manages to destroy all the dolls in one move. Kubira makes two clones of Yuya to confuse Demon Eyes Kyo, who instinctively slashes them both. As Yuya is held captive by Kubira, Demon Eyes Kyo unlocks the true power of the Tenrō to stealthily shatter Kubira, who still manages to survive in the morning. Yuya believes that Demon Eyes Kyo is not her brother's killer. When Kubira seemingly discovers the correlation between Demon Eyes Kyo and Kyoshiro, Akira kills Kubira in retaliation by encasing him in ice.
11	"Pitch Black Flashback" "Shikkoku no Furasshubakku" (漆黒のフラッシュバック)	September 10, 2002	August 13, 2006
While visiting the grave of his former martial arts master who taught the Hōzōin spearmanship style, Benitora is targeted by a member of the Jūnishinshō named Mekira, a former classmate of his who wields a giant scythe. However, Benitora struggles to properly wield the Hokuraku Shimon. Mekira explains that he killed their martial arts master for not revealing the secret of the Shinkage fighting style. Their martial arts master once lectured about "taking the reflecting moon" as a way to defeat their opponents. Benitora is shocked when Mekira dodges his quick thrust attack and breaks the Koyoku. In a bidding strategy, Benitora manages to pick up the Hokuraku Shimon again. Benitora points out that Demon Eyes Kyo relies on his own power, something that Mekira cannot do. Realizing that the secret of the Shinkage fighting style is about relying on his own strength, Benitora wields the Hokuraku Shimon and manages to mutilate Mekira. Before Mekira dies, Benitora states that true power and strength comes from within. At a waterfall, Demon Eyes Kyo, Yuya and Okuni come across Sasuke, who supposedly wields an ōdachi identical to the Tenrō.
12	"The Boy From the Deep Forest" "Diipu Foresuto kara Kita Shōnen" (ディープ・フォレストから来た少年)	September 17, 2002	August 14, 2006
During a friendly duel, Demon Eyes Kyo exposes the fact that Sasuke wields an ordinary ōdachi. Benitora catches up to Demon Eyes Kyo, Yuya and Okuni at the waterfall, where Sasuke guides them to Aokigahara. Sasuke was born in Aokigahara before being under the care of Yukimura. Okuni steps out to fetch some water, Demon Eyes Kyo, Yuya, Benitora and Sasuke are suddenly attacked by two members of the Jūnishinshō named Makora and Haira. Makora immobilizes them by using his kunai to control shadows, though Sasuke manages to fight back and free the others. Haira uses his ability to shoot energy blasts from his chest, though he is unable to have a clear shot when Demon Eyes Kyo and Sasuke separate from Yuya and Benitora. Sasuke is shocked when he realizes that Makora is actually his childhood friend named Kotarō Fūma. Demon Eyes Kyo critically injures Haira in one slash, while Makora chooses to hide in the shadows. Sasuke loses his focus and shatters his ōdachi upon attacking Haira, but Yukimura arrives in the nick of time to protect Sasuke and kill Haira. As Yuya and Benitora wonder why Sasuke lost his focus earlier, Makora shortly returns.
13	"Crossing Souls" "Kurosusuru Tamashii tachi" (クロスする魂たち)	September 23, 2002	August 15, 2006
Before chasing after Makora, Sasuke tells the others that there is a nearby river that leads to Aokigahara. Deep in the woods, Sasuke and Makora outsmart each other with their unique illusion techniques, but Makora ultimately immobilizes Sasuke inside a cave. Yukimura comes to the rescue, urging Makora to retreat and cause the cave to collapse, though Yukimura and Sasuke manage to swiftly escape. As Demon Eyes Kyo, Yuya and Benitora arrive at the river, Benitora decides to search for Okuni, Yukimura and Sasuke. Benitora chances upon a member of the Jūnishinshō named Antera, who wields a large hammer. Demon Eyes Kyo and Yuya encounter another member of the Jūnishinshō named Bikara, who is armed with numerous metal disks. After Antera seemingly crushes Benitora under a pile of logs, she then picks a fight with Yuya, while Demon Eyes Kyo and Bikara engage in battle. When Antera strains herself too hard and begins to deteriorate, Bikara opts to combine with her into a frog-like demon. Yukimura and Sasuke find Benitora and Okuni. Demon Eyes Kyo proceeds to kill Bikara and Antera. Yuya is then captured by Akira as well as another member of the Jūnishinshō named Shindara.
14	"Satan Again" "Satan Futatabi" (サタン再び)	October 1, 2002	August 16, 2006
Benitora impatiently runs off to find Yuya, while Yukimura and Sasuke leave Demon Eyes Kyo and Okuni to rest at the entrance of Aokigahara. With an unconscious Yuya in tow, Akira, Santera and Shindara are confronted by Migeira, who seeks to kill Nobunaga in the name of justice. Akira and Shindara take Yuya with them, while Santera immobilizes Migeira by emitting her purple powder. Migeira still manages to break free, causing Santera to retreat. Yukimura tells Sasuke that Demon Eyes Kyo was gravely injured during his battle against Bikara and Antera. When Migeira finds Santera being protected by the cloaked inhabitants of Aokigahara, Sasuke stops Migeira from attacking, while Yukimura reveals that Santera was born in Aokigahara. Demon Eyes Kyo and Okuni get lost in Aokigahara as if it were a labyrinth. They are momentarily attacked by a member of the Jūnishinshō named Basara, who specializes in archery by shooting a barrage of arrows. Sakuya previously told Yukimura that the meteor from four years ago was a demon world portal. Using a temporary vessel, Nobunaga is known as the Rokuten Demon King, who has been waiting eighteen years to claim the body of Demon Eyes Kyo as his own.
15	"Our Friend Red Tiger" "Waga Tomo Reddo Taigaa" (我が友レッド＜紅虎＞タイガー)	October 8, 2002	August 17, 2006
After Yuya regains consciousness, she is told by Akira that they are in a field called Yomotsu Hirasaka, which brings up painful past memories like her late brother's death. Mekora tells Shindara that the sealed body of Demon Eyes Kyo has been found. Demon Eyes Kyo comes face-to-face with Nobunaga riding on a white stallion. Basara reveals that he previously shot Demon Eyes Kyo with a poison arrow, shockingly unveiling that Okuni is actually a member of the Jūnishinshō named Indara. After Demon Eyes Kyo fails to land a hit on Nobunaga, the latter conjures a demonic hand that could easily wipes out anything it touches. However, Benitora and Migeira arrive together to intervene, forcing Nobunaga to retreat for now. Benitora decides to solely face Nobunaga, bypassing Okuni's barrier. Sasuke rescues Santera and the cloaked inhabitants of Aokigahara after being attacked by Basara, who then engages in battle against Yukimura. Surprisingly, Sasuke shields Yukimura from being hit with Basara's arrows. Nobunaga insinuates that Benitora would betrayed his friends someday. Benitora risks his life to execute a quick thrust attack that explodes Nobunaga's white stallion and forces Nobunaga to stand on his feet, though Benitora is left in critical condition.
16	"Perfect Victory" "Kanpekinaru Bikutorii" (完璧なるビクトリー)	October 15, 2002	August 18, 2006
Assuring that Sasuke is not a mere tool to him, Yukimura reveals himself as a Kenyo before defeating Basara with a discarded arrow, while Saizo shortly arrives and tends to Sasuke. Upon rescuing Benitora, Okuni is then confronted by Migeira, though Demon Eyes Kyo clears up the confusion by saying that Okuni is an informant. Nobunaga gravely injures Okuni with his demonic hand, urging Demon Eyes Kyo to fight Nobunaga. Yukimura prevents Migeira from interfering with the fight. As his body directly drawn upon Aokigahara starts to deteriorate, Nobunaga orders the leader of the Jūnishinshō named Shatora to give him more power. At the heart of Aokigahara, where the sealed body of Demon Eyes Kyo is located, Akira traitorously encases Yuya, Mekora and Shindara in ice. Kyoshiro finally regains control of his body and recovers his memories, though he presents himself with a cold personality like Demon Eyes Kyo. Nobunaga reveals that the Mibu Clan is responsible for reviving him during the Battle of Sekigahara. However, Kyoshiro already abandoned the Mibu Clan years ago and became a medicine peddler for that reason. Kyoshiro unlocks the true power of the Tenrō to stealthily uproot Nobunaga.
17	"The Secret Talk of Girls" "Shoujotachi no Shiikuretto Tooku" (少女たちのシークレットトーク)	October 22, 2002	September 16, 2006
Yuya recalls that she became a bounty hunter in order to find her late brother's killer. In the past, Yuya eventually grew fond of Kyoshiro, though she still opted to travel with Demon Eyes Kyo when he took full control of Kyoshiro. Demon Eyes Kyo participated in the Shogun's Tournament so Yukimura could tell him the location of his sealed body. Yuya also met Benitora, a former member of the Sansai Shū, as well as Migeira, a self-proclaimed seer who believes that Demon Eyes Kyo will cause the end of the world. Back in the present, Sakuya appears to Yuya and proceeds to free her from being encased in ice. Sakuya explains that Kyoshiro defeated Demon Eyes Kyo and sealed his body deep inside Aokigahara. The demon world portal in the form of a meteor that struck four years ago sent a shockwave that drove the soul of Demon Eyes Kyo into Kyoshiro. Despite being denied the body of Demon Eyes Kyo, Nobunaga was temporarily sustained by the members of the Jūnishinshō. After listing the members of the Jūnishinshō, Sakuya urges Yuya to find Kyoshiro. Akira then appears to Kyoshiro, Yukimura, Benitora, Okuni, Sasuke, Saizo, Migeira and Shatora.
18	"Nurturing the Devil" "Naasu na Akuma" (ナースな悪魔 ♥)	October 29, 2002	September 17, 2006
Kyoshiro reawakens as Demon Eyes Kyo when Akira claims of taking the sealed body of Demon Eyes Kyo and the life of Yuya. Just as Akira prepares to attack Demon Eyes Kyo, they are shortly interrupted by Yuya, causing Akira to retreat. Aokigahara becomes engulfed in flames as Demon Eyes Kyo, Yukimura, Benitora, Okuni, Sasuke, Saizo and Migeira take refuge at an inn, while Mekora and Shindara meet up with Shatora inside a portal to hide. It is revealed that Yuya watched as Santera sacrificed herself to free Mekora and Shindara from being encased in ice. Yuya treats Okuni for her wounds using Kyoshiro's medicines. Yukimura warns Demon Eyes Kyo that his soul might never return if Kyoshiro reclaims his body, though Demon Eyes Kyo has the support of his friends and does not have to face Akira alone anymore. Okuni and Migeira part ways to find out more about the Mibu Clan. After Kosuke reports to Yukimura that Sakuya has gone missing, Demon Eyes Kyo, Yuya, Benitora, Yukimura, Sasuke and Saizo find Sakuya at Muramasa's village. However, Sakuya is willingly captured by two female members of the Mibu Clan dressed in nurse uniforms named Saiko and Saisei.
19	"Thunderbolt Attack" "Sandaaboruto Zangeki" (サンダーボルト斬撃)	November 5, 2002	September 18, 2006
After Sakuya is captured, Muramasa makes his appearance to the others. Upon finding out that Mekora has decided to ally himself with the Mibu Clan, Sasuke chases after Mekora, while Saizo reports the matter to Yukimura. In the woods at night, Yuya, Yukimura and Saizo watch as Demon Eyes Kyo easily defends Muramasa from several assassins sent by Shinrei, a member of the Mibu Clan who uses a water style technique. Demon Eyes Kyo then picks a fight with Shinrei. While being suddenly attacked by two other assassins named Maki and Jaki, Benitora is soon assisted by the timely arrival of Mahiro and Sasuke. Shinrei conjures a water dragon spirit that pierces through Demon Eyes Kyo, though he is still alive. While Sasuke and Mahiro struggle in their battle against Maki, Benitora momentarily blasts Jaki to death. The Hokuraku Shimon inadvertently breaks open a nearby shed containing an ōdachi called the Shibien, which has been bound to chains. Shinrei intends for the Mibu Clan to leave the shadow and rule the land. Sasuke manages to wield the Shibien and shockingly slashes Maki in one strike. With Demon Eyes Kyo left powerless, Muramasa prepares to duel Shinrei using the Tenrō.
20	"Far Away, to Absolute Zero" "Abusoryūto Zero no kanata e" (アブソリュートゼロの彼方へ)	November 12, 2002	September 19, 2006
Unleashing the true power of the Tenrō, Muramasa passes out after temporarily overwhelming Shinrei. Okuni and Migeira realize that the capital city of Kyoto has been reduced to ashes by the Mibu Clan. They manage to find the body of Demon Eyes Kyo inside a storehouse, where Akira urges them to leave. Suddenly, they all encounter Hotaru, a member of the Mibu Clan who uses a fire style technique. Hotaru is Shinrei's half-brother and Akira's former friend. Migeira is dumbfounded when Akira risks his life to protect Okuni from getting hurt by Hotaru. As Okuni and Migeira retreat back to Muramasa's village, Hokaru overcomes Akira's attacks with fire and captures the body of Demon Eyes Kyo. Shinrei effortlessly fends off Benitora, Sasuke and Mahiro when they arrive. When Yuya fails to shoot Shinrei from point-blank range, Demon Eyes Kyo has the willpower to shield Yuya from Shinrei, who then vanishes into thin air. Muramasa later explains to Yuya that Demon Eyes Kyo has learned two basic techniques, while Kyoshiro is the only one who has learned four advanced techniques. Okuni intends to meet the Mibu Clan on her own, but she is reluctantly joined by Yukimura.
21	"The Demonic Mibu Castle" "Jigoku no Mibu Kyassuru" (地獄のミブ・キャッスル)	November 19, 2002	September 20, 2006
Saizo restrains Sasuke when the latter believes that Yukimura wants to ally himself with the Mibu Clan, though Migeira believes there is an ulterior motive. As a dying wish, Muramasa requests Yuya to accompany Demon Eyes Kyo on his journey. Before fading into nothingness, Muramasa urges Yuya to go to Mibu Castle located in Sekigahara. While Demon Eyes Kyo, Yuya, Benitora, Sasuke, Saizo, Migeira and Mahiro travel together, Okuni has her concerns as to why Yukimura wants to go to Mibu Castle. After relaxing in a hot spring with Mahiro at an inn, Yuya finds Demon Eyes Kyo in her room as she recalls that Muramasa told her to stay with Demon Eyes Kyo. However, Demon Eyes Kyo threatens Yuya to keep her distance from him. On the foggy grounds of Mibu Castle, Shinrei becomes suspicious of Shatora for wanting to see the elders, but Hotaru vouches for her. Upon arriving at Sekigahara, Yuya, Benitora and Migeira separate from Demon Eyes Kyo and Sasuke. Yuya, Benitora and Migeira encounter Saiko and Saisei, revealed to be masters of wood, as the three fight off summoned pseudo-zombies in the form of cannibalistic women.
22	"The Machine Made Dolls" "Kikaijikake no Dooruzu" (機械仕掛けのドールズ)	November 26, 2002	September 21, 2006
Shatora receives permission from the elders to resurrect Nobunaga again. After Benitora and Migeira realize that Saisei herself is a true zombie, Saiko orders Saisei to perform a spiritual surgery on Yuya, bearing a red crest representing a time bomb on her chest. Meanwhile, Yukimura and Okuni arrive at Mibu Castle, where Sakuya is being guarded by Shinrei. Yukimura seemingly pushes Saizo into the dungeon below for having followed him to Mibu Castle. When Saisei clads herself in armor, she easily overwhelms Benitora and Migeira in one strike. Yuya is caught off guard when Saiko and Saisei explain that Demon Eyes Kyo was artificially created by the Mibu Clan. Shinrei takes Yukimura to see the body of Demon Eyes Kyo in a chamber, though Shatora plans to use it to resurrect Nobunaga again. Charging at Saisei when the red crest gradually fades away, Yuya ends up getting absorbed inside Saisei. Surprisingly, Yuya makes it out alive when she shoots Saisei's heart and causes Saisei to dissolve into sawdust. Benitora and Migeira then manage to kill Saiko as a team. Mahiro joins Demon Eyes Kyo and Sasuke upon arriving at Mibu Castle, where Hotaru stands in their way at the entrance.
23	"Scorching Ecstasy" "Shakunetsu no Ekusutashii" (灼熱のエクスタシー)	December 3, 2002	September 22, 2006
Sasuke and Mahiro witness Demon Eyes Kyo and Hotaru facing off in an intense duel. Meanwhile, Shatora and Shinrei stop Sakuya from destroying the body of Demon Eyes Kyo. As Yuya, Benitora and Migeira arrive, Hotaru states that Demon Eyes Kyo is unbridled by desires of fears. Shinrei reports his suspicions of Shatora to the elders, while Okuni and Sakuya are both shackled in the dungeon. Hotaru conjures a fire tiger spirit, but Demon Eyes Kyo easily slashes through it. Sakuya tells Okuni that Kyoshiro distilled the soul of his fighting instinct to create the body of Demon Eyes Kyo, who would become the Red King, ruler of the Mibu Clan. However, Demon Eyes Kyo chose to selfishly abandon his duties of the Mibu Clan, which encouraged Hotaru to follow him across the country until his first encounter with Akira. Hotaru engulfs Demon Eyes Kyo in black flames, causing Yuya to cry out, though Demon Eyes Kyo manages to survive. Okuni learns that Demon Eyes Kyo separated his peaceful nature from his fighting instinct to preserve his love for Sakuya. Much to Shinrei's chagrin, Yukimura apprehends a staff called the Tengoku, the final cursed weapon forged by Muramasa.
24	"Last Muramasa Awakening" "Rasuto Muramasa Kakusei" (ラストムラマサ覚醒)	December 10, 2002	September 23, 2006
Demon Eyes Kyo conjures a red phoenix with the ability to regenerate after being extinguished by Hotaru's black flames, though Demon Eyes Kyo ultimately spares the defeated Hotaru. While Shatora uses the body of Demon Eyes Kyo to begin resurrecting Nobunaga in the chamber, Yukimura challenges Demon Eyes Kyo to a sparring match at the stairway. Shindara confirms Saizo's death and Yukimura's loyalty to the Mibu Clan, while Sasuke fights Makora on the rooftop. Benitora tries to reach Demon Eyes Kyo, but Makora temporarily immobilizes Mahiro with his kunai. As Yuya witnesses Demon Eyes Kyo and Yukimura fighting each other as friendly equals, Sasuke uses that mentality to fight Makora, who becomes powerless to defense himself. Shindara angrily captures Sasuke and pushes Makora off the rooftop. Yukimura transforms the Tengoku into a bow to blast Shindara away before catching Sasuke in his arms. Revealed to still be alive, Saizo rescues Okuni from the dungeon, explaining that Yukimura deceived the Mibu Clan in order to get the Tengoku. Thanks to Shatora, Nobunaga is now resurrected again, this time using the body of Demon Eyes Kyo as his vessel.
25	"The One that Surpasses Tach" "Takion o Koeru Mono" (タキオンを超える者)	December 17, 2002	September 24, 2006
Demon Eyes Kyo, Yuya, Benitora, Yukimura, Sasuke, Saizo and Migeira head to the chamber, while Okuni, Mahiro and Makora stay behind. After Nobunaga kills the elders, Shatora reveals that her plan is to overrun the world with Kenyo using Sakuya as the catalyst for opening the demon world portal. Nobunaga quickly paralyzes Shinrei when the latter is against this course of action. Demon Eyes Kyo prepares to fight Nobunaga, while Yuya rushes to rescue Sakuya. Nobunaga effortlessly neutralizes and absorbs the combined attacks of Yukimura and Sasuke. Not even Benitora and Migeira can defeat Nobunaga. However, Yuya believes Demon Eyes Kyo may be strong enough. In a heated exchange, both Demon Eyes Kyo and Nobunaga conjure a red phoenix, but the latter manages to overwhelm the former. When Migeria absorbs the Hokuraku Shimon, the Shibien and the Tengoku in the Hashagō, he pulverizes Shatora, revealed to be Nobunaga's biological sister Kata of Oichi. This does not fix history just yet since Nobunaga is still alive. Kyoshiro reawakens and urges Migeira to absorb the Tenrō, which will restore balance to the chaos centered around the two split souls.
26	"The Ballad of the Samurai" "Samurai wa Baraddo o Utau" (SAMURAIはバラードをうたう)	December 24, 2002	September 25, 2006
Akira suddenly appears and temporarily encases Nobunaga in ice. When Nobunaga breaks free, the personalities of Kyoshiro and Demon Eyes Kyo fuse together in one body, using the Tenrō to absorb the Hashagō and recovering Migeira's right arm. With the five cursed weapons combined into one, this consequently opens a time gate to the modern era. Kyoshiro and Nobunaga have a final showdown with their red phoenixes conjured on the Tokyo Tower. As the two eras collide, Shindara explains that Shatora used Sakuya's power to summon the demon world portal. Moreover, Shindara has the ability to foresee and change the future, just like Migeira. Shindara sacrifices his life to draw the demon world portal into the time gate, causing Mibu Castle to disappear. After defeating Nobunaga, Demon Eyes Kyo reclaims his body separate from Kyoshiro. Benitora leaves with Mahiro, Hanzō and Nobuyuki, while Yukimura, Sasuke and Saizo return to Kudo Mountain. As it begins to snow, Akira reconciles with Hotaru, while Sakuya and Shinrei plan to rebuild the Mibu Clan scattered across the country into factions. Sakuya unveils that Yuya's late brother was a devoted assassin sent by the Mibu Clan to stop Kyoshiro from getting to Sekigahara in the first place. Realizing that Kyoshiro and Demon Eyes Kyo are having a duel to the death in the woods, she rushes to see Kyoshiro, who is the victor. Eleven years later during the summer campaign of the Siege of Osaka, Benitora and Yukimura fight on opposite sides of the battlefield as they hear the voice of Yuya, who is seen as a medicine peddler with Kyoshiro on the countryside.

=== Video games ===
Two video games based on Samurai Deeper Kyo have been published by Bandai. The first, a versus fighting game for the PlayStation, was released in Japan on December 12, 2002. Alongside the regular edition of the game, Bandai released a "Limited Edition" bundled with a Samurai Deeper Kyo collectible card game. The second, an action-adventure game for the Game Boy Advance (GBA), was developed by Marvelous Entertainment and released in Japan on December 27, 2002. The game was later localized for North America by Destineer and bundled with a re-release of the anime series box set in 2008; it was the last game to be released for the GBA before the system's discontinuation in North America.

Kyo is a playable character in the 2009 fighting game Sunday vs Magazine: Shūketsu! Chōjō Daikessen, released by Konami for the PlayStation Portable.
