= List of series run in Weekly Shōnen Magazine =

Weekly Shōnen Magazine cover for its 60th anniversary in 2019

Weekly Shōnen Magazine, a shōnen manga magazine published by Kodansha, has featured numerous series since its launch in 1959. The list, organized by decade and year of when the series started, will list each series run in the manga magazine, the author of the series and, in case the series has ended, when it has ended.

== 1950s ==
=== 1959 ===
Manga	First Issue	Final Issue	Manga artist	Notes
13-Gō Hasshin Seyo (13号発進せよ)	#1, 1959	#20, 1960	Yoshiteru Takano	
Sakon Ukon (左近右近)	#1, 1959	#8, 1959	Shinobu Ippei, Enji Shimokawa, Eiji Yoshikawa (original story)	
Bōken Senchō (冒険船長)	#1, 1959	#12, 1959	Masaharu Endō	
Mon Yoshi-kun (もん吉くん)	#1, 1959	#38, 1959	Akio Itō, Michio Suzuki	
Hayate Jūjisei (疾風十字星)	#1, 1959	#12, 1959	Eiji Yamada, Satoru Ōki	
Ryōta wa Makenai (良太は負けない)	#2, 1959	#8, 1959	Haruki Yamada	
Tenji Doji (天兵童子)	#3, 1959	#19, 1959	Hiroshi Yano, Ryūji Shīna, Eiji Yoshikawa (original story)	
Ōnishi Kyojin (大西巨人)	#13, 1959	#32, 1959	Toshikane Fukuda, Kōichi Ōtsu	
Apatchi Tōshu (アパッチ投手)	#20, 1959	#28, 1960	Kyota Ishikawa, Mitsuo Sano	
Patorōru Q (パトロールQ)	#30, 1959	#16, 1960	Masato Tenma, Teruo Itō	
Sandaru Santa (サンダル三太)	#34, 1959	#9, 1960	Keiji Nagasaki	
Tsuppari Tarō (つっぱり太郎)	#39, 1959	#13, 1960	Akio Itō, Yoshimi Hososhima	

== 1960s ==
=== 1960–1964 ===
Manga	First Issue	Final Issue	Manga artist	Notes
Kaiketsu Harimao (快傑ハリマオ)	#16, 1960	#10, 1961	Shotaro Ishinomori, Katsuro Yamada	
Mahha Sanshirō (マッハ三四郎)	#8, 1960	#52, 1960	Tatsuo Yoshida	
Chikai no Makyū (ちかいの魔球)	#1, 1961	#50, 1962	Tetsuya Chiba, Kazuya Fukimoto	
Champion Futoshi (チャンピオン太)	#1, 1962	#52, 1963	Tatsuo Yoshida, Ikki Kajiwara	
Banzai Tantei-chō (バンザイ探偵長)	#2, 1963	#19, 1963	Hisashi Sekiya	
Kuroi Himitsu Heiki (黒い秘密兵器)	#19, 1963	#50, 1965	Daiji Kazumine, Kazuya Fukimoto	
8 Man (8マン)	#20, 1963	#13, 1965	Jiro Kuwata, Kazumasa Hirai	
Shiden-kai no Taka (紫電改のタカ)	#27, 1963	#3/4, 1965	Tetsuya Chiba	
Marude Dameo (丸出だめ夫)	#1, 1964	#26, 1967	Kenji Morita	

=== 1965–1969 ===
Manga	First Issue	Final Issue	Manga artist	Notes
Rainbow Sentai (レインボー戦隊)	#1, 1965	#14, 1965	Shotaro Ishinomori	
Wakatono (わかとの)	#2, 1965	#31, 1965	Fujio Fujiko Ⓐ	
The Amazing 3 (W3 ワンダー・スリー, W 3 Wandā Surī)	#13, 1965	#18, 1965	Osamu Tezuka	
Tonari no Tamageta-kun (となりのたまげ太くん)	#14, 1965	#33, 1965	Shotaro Ishinomori	
Harris no Kaze (ハリスの旋風, Harisu no Kaze)	#16, 1965	#47, 1967	Tetsuya Chiba	
Watari (ワタリ)	#18, 1965	#37, 1967	Sanpei Shirato	First period from #18, 1965 to #8, 1966. Second period from #14 to #49, 1966. Third period from #7 to #37, 1967.
Kibaō (牙王)	#20, 1965	#12, 1966	Kyuta Ishikawa, Yukio Togawa	
Uchū Shōnen Soran (宇宙少年ソラン)	#20, 1965	#45, 1966	Kazuya Fukumoto, Yoshikatsu Miyakoshi	
GeGeGe no Kitarō (ゲゲゲの鬼太郎)	#32, 1965	#12, 1969	Shigeru Mizuki	First serialized as Hakaba no Kitarō (墓場の鬼太郎; lit. 'Kitarō of the Graveyard') until issue #41, 1967. Re-titled as GeGeGe no Kitarō from issue #46, 1967.
Kiiroi Tebukuro X (黄色い手袋X)	#1, 1966	#51, 1966	Jiro Kuwata, Kohan Kawauchi	
Akuma-kun (悪魔くん)	#1, 1966	#16, 1967	Shigeru Mizuki	
Kyojin no Hoshi (巨人の星)	#19, 1966	#3, 1971	Noboru Kawasaki, Ikki Kajiwara	
Ultraman (ウルトラマン)	#27, 1966	#19, 1967	Kazuo Umezu	
Cyborg 009 (サイボーグ009)	#30, 1966	#13, 1967	Shōtarō Ishinomori	
Patman X (パットマンX, Pattoman X)	#1, 1967	#50, 1968	George Akiyama	
Tensai Bakabon (天才バカボン)	#15, 1967	#49, 1976	Fujio Akatsuka	First period from #15, 1967 to #9, 1969. Second period from #27, 1971 to #2, 1975. Third period from #43, 1975 to #49, 1976.
Genma Taisen (幻魔大戦)	#18, 1967	#52, 1967	Shotaro Ishinomori, Kazumasa Hirai	
Chingo Muchabei (珍豪ムチャ兵衛)	#31, 1967	#20, 1968	Kenji Morita	
Ultraseven (ウルトラセブン, Urutorasebun)	#38, 1967	#38, 1967	Jiro Kuwata	
Muyounosuke (無用ノ介)	#38, 1967	#10, 1970	Takao Saito	
Ashita no Joe (あしたのジョー)	#1, 1968	#19, 1973	Tetsuya Chiba, Asao Takamori	Published in English by Kodansha USA.
Kurobe no Taiyō (黒部の太陽)	#1, 1968	#4, 1968	Masamichi Yokoyama	
Kikkai kun (キッカイくん)	#2, 1969	#11, 1970	Go Nagai	
Horafuki Dondon (ほらふきドンドン)	#6, 1969	#31, 1970	George Akiyama	
Ryuu no Michi (リュウの道)	#14, 1969	#52, 1970	Shotaro Ishinomori	

== 1970s ==
=== 1970–1974 ===
Manga	First Issue	Final Issue	Manga artist	Notes
Skull Man (スカルマン, Sukaru Man)	#3, 1970	—	Shotaro Ishinomori	One chapter.
Waru (ワル)	#4/5, 1970	#2, 1973	Joya Kagemaru, Hisao Maki	
Hikaru Kaze (光る風)	#18, 1970	#47, 1970	Tatsuhiko Yamagami	
Yasuji Tanioka no Mettameta Gaki Dou Kouza (ヤスジのメッタメタガキ道講座)	#19, 1970	#38, 1971	Yasuji Tanioka	
Oyabaka Tengoku (親バカ天国)	#19, 1970	#8, 1971	Aki Ryuzan	
Homo Homo 7 (ホモホモ7)	#30, 1970	#13, 1971	Tarō Minamoto	
Ashura (アシュラ)	#32, 1970	#22, 1971	George Akiyama	
Kugishi Sabuyan (釘師サブやん)	#9, 1971	#51, 1972	Big Jo, Jirō Gyū	
Otoko Oidon (男おいどん)	#20, 1971	#33, 1973	Leiji Matsumoto	
Karate Baka Ichidai (空手バカ一代)	#22, 1971	#52, 1977	Jirō Tsunoda, Ikki Kajiwara, Jōya Kagemaru	
Kamen Rider (仮面ライダー, Kamen Raidā)	#23, 1971	#53, 1972	Shotaro Ishinomori	
Tiger Mask (タイガーマスク, Taigā Masuku)	#26, 1971	#53, 1971	Naoki Tsuji, Ikki Kajiwara	
Omorai-kun (オモライくん)	#1, 1972	#23, 1972	Go Nagai	
Henshin Ninja Arashi (変身忍者嵐)	#10, 1972	#41, 1972	Ken Ishikawa, Shotaro Ishinomori	
Gunryuden (群竜伝)	#19, 1972	#15, 1973	Hiroshi Motomiya	
Ai no Senshi Reinbōman (愛の戦士レインボーマン)	#39, 1972	#41, 1973	Kawauchi Kohan	
Devilman (デビルマン)	#25, 1972	#27, 1973	Go Nagai	Published in English by Seven Seas Entertainment in a two-volume omnibus edition in 2018.
Yakyū-kyō no Uta (野球狂の詩)	#35, 1972	#52, 1976	Shinji Mizushima	
Hi no Hitomi (火の瞳)	#3, 1972	1972	Toshiya Masaoka	
Robot Detective (ロボット刑事)	#1, 1973	#41, 1973	Shotaro Ishinomori	
Ai to Makoto (愛と誠)	#3/4, 1973	#39, 1976	Takumi Nagayasu, Ikki Kajiwara	
Yami no Doki (闇の土鬼)	#18, 1973	#13, 1974	Mitsuteru Yokoyama	
Violence Jack (バイオレンスジャック)	#29, 1973	#39, 1974	Go Nagai	
Fisherman Sanpei (釣りキチ三平, Tsurikichi Sanpei)	#32, 1973	#19, 1983	Takao Yaguchi	
Ore wa Teppei (おれは鉄兵)	#33, 1973	#20, 1980	Tetsuya Chiba	
Kurenai no Chousensha (紅の挑戦者)	#37, 1973	#52, 1975	Ken Nakajō, Ikki Kajiwara	
Wadachi (ワダチ)	#44, 1973	#15, 1974	Leiji Matsumoto	
Ushiro no Hyakutarou (うしろの百太郎)	#50, 1973	#1, 1976	Jirō Tsunoda	
Mitsume ga Toru (三つ目がとおる)	#28, 1974	#12, 1978	Osamu Tezuka	
Iyahaya Nantomo (イヤハヤ南友)	#45, 1974	#21, 1976	Go Nagai	
Tetsumen Cross (鉄面クロス)	#52, 1974	#2, 1975	Shotaro Ishinomori	

=== 1975–1979 ===
Manga	First Issue	Final Issue	Manga artist	Notes
B.C. Adamu (B.C.アダム)	#2, 1975	1975	Fujio Akatsuka	
Tetsumen Tantei Gen (鉄面探偵ゲン)	#38, 1975	#20, 1976	Shotaro Ishinomori	
Sonohoka-kun (その他くん)	#2, 1976	#52, 1976	Jirō Tsunoda	
St. Muscle (聖マッスル, Seimassuru)	#32, 1976	#1, 1977	Masami Fukushima	
Shutendoji (手天童子)	#36, 1976	#18, 1978	Go Nagai, Pro Dynamic	
Tarao Bannai (多羅尾伴内)	#42, 1977	#45, 1978	Shotaro Ishinomori, Kazuo Koike	
Chojou Saikyou no Otoko Ryuu (地上最強の男 竜)	#1, 1977	#20, 1977	Shinobu Kaze	
Kenshi Kensaku (建師ケン作)	#2, 1977	#31, 1977	Fujio Akatsuka, Jirō Gyū	
Football Hawk (フットボール鷹, Futtobōru Taka)	#3/4, 1977	#14, 1979	Noboru Kawasaki	
Hausujakku Nana-chan (ハウスジャックナナちゃん)	#50, 1977	#52, 1977	Fujio Akatsuka	
Queen Emeraldas (クイーン・エメラルダス)	#2, 1978	#41, 1978	Leiji Matsumoto	Published in English by Kodansha USA in a two-volume deluxe edition in 2016.
Shikakui Jungle (四角いジャングル)	#3/4, 1978	#17, 1980	Ken Nakajō, Ikki Kajiwara	
Tonda Couple (翔んだカップル)	#17, 1978	#13, 1981	Kimio Yanagisawa	
Mirai Otoko Kaos (未来人カオス)	#29, 1978	#1, 1979	Osamu Tezuka	
Hana no Yotarou: Seishun Jidaigeki (花の咲太郎: 青春時代劇)	#35, 1978	#49, 1979	George Akiyama	
Shōnen Jidai (少年時代)	#37, 1978	#33, 1979	Fujio Fujiko Ⓐ	
1-2 no Sanshirou (1・2の三四郎)	#46, 1978	#11, 1983	Makoto Kobayashi	
Subarashiki Bandits (素晴らしきバンディッツ, Subarashiki Bandittsu)	#1, 1979	#37, 1980	Sho Fumimura	
Toughness Daichi (タフネス大地, Tafunesu Daichi)	#2, 1979	#35, 1981	Natsuki Owada	
Insekutā (インセクター)	#14, 1979	#21, 1979	Osamu Tezuka	
Itoshi no Boccha (愛しのボッチャー)	#20, 1979	#53, 1981	Jin Kawaguchi	
Susano Oh (凄ノ王)	#30, 1979	#17, 1981	Go Nagai	
Sheriff (シェリフ, Sherifu)	#42, 1979	#33, 1980	Mitsuru Sugaya	

== 1980s ==
=== 1980–1984 ===
Manga	First Issue	Final Issue	Manga artist	Notes
Munasawagi no Eve (胸さわぎの放課後)	#36, 1980	#46, 1983	Mio Murao	
Ashita Tenki ni Naare (あした天気になあれ)	#42, 1980	#25, 1991	Tetsuya Chiba	
The Kabocha Wine (The・かぼちゃワイン, Za Kabocha Wain)	#4/5, 1981	#26, 1984	Mitsuru Miura	
Hikari no Kojirō (光の小次郎)	#18, 1981	#33, 1984	Shinji Mizushima	
Gakuran Hachinengumi (ガクラン八年組)	#21, 1981	#20, 1983	Tamotsu Shimosaka	
Konpora sensei (コンポラ先生)	#23, 1981	#33, 1984	Masahide Motohashi	
Shuniaka (朱に赤)	#29, 1981	#22, 1982	Kimio Yanagisawa	
Aitsu to Lullaby (あいつとララバイ, Aitsu to Rarabai)	#40, 1981	#40, 1989	Michiharu Kusunoki	
Kōtarō Makaritōru! (コータローまかりとおる!)	#36, 1982	#34, 1994	Tatsuya Hiruta	
Bats & Terry (バツ&テリー, Batsu ando Teri)	#4/5, 1983	#42, 1987	Yasuichi Oshima	
Iron Muscle (アイアンマッスル, Aian Massuru)	#7, 1983	#50, 1983	Go Nagai, Pro Dynamic	
Bari Bari Densetsu (バリバリ伝説)	#12, 1983	#30, 1991	Shuichi Shigeno	
Fifutīn Rabu (フィフティーン・ラブ)	#1/2, 1984	#15, 1986	Natsuko Heiuchi	
Inō Senshi (異能戦士)	#3/4, 1984	#33, 1984	Yoshinori Kobayashi	
Moshikashite Koibito (もしかしてKOIBITO)	#5, 1984	#4/5, 1986	Mio Murao	
Ekushisu (エクシス)	#15, 1984	#41, 1984	Takatoshi Yamada	
Lensman (レンズマンRenzuman)	#41, 1984	#18, 1985	Mitsuru Miura	
Gokudou-kun (極道くん)	#42, 1984	#52, 1986	Shinji Mizushima	

=== 1985–1989 ===
Manga	First Issue	Final Issue	Manga artist	Notes
Banira 37 °C (バニラ37°C)	#1, 1985	#32, 1985	Toshiyuki Mutsu	
Konpora Kiddo (コンポラキッド)	#13, 1985	#52, 1985	Masahide Motohashi	
Seiryū no Shinwa (青龍の神話)	#26, 1985	#1, 1986	Yuzuru Shimazaki	
Yoru yo Sayonara (夜よさよなら)	#33, 1985	—	Osamu Tezuka	One chapter.
Dokkin Roripoppu (どっきんロリポップ)	#37, 1985	#17, 1986	Masami Izawa	
Kokonattsu AVE. (ココナッツAVE.)	#38, 1985	#40, 1986	Mitsuru Miura	
Kazuya Now (一矢NOW)	#7, 1986	#20, 1986	George Morikawa	
Go-Q-Choji Ikkiman (剛Q超児イッキマン)	#19, 1986	#36, 1986	Kazuo Takahashi, Yasuo Tanami	
Hip Hop Ōen-dan: Tokyo Bakufu Ōen-den (ヒップホップ応援団-東京爆風応援伝-)	#20, 1986	#31, 1987	Shuzo Uchiyama	
Aogeba Tōtoshi (仰げば尊し!)	#39, 1986	#39, 1987	Jūzō Tokoro	
Mister Ajikko (ミスター味っ子)	#40, 1986	#4/5, 1990	Daisuke Terasawa	
Kaze no Mario (風のマリオ)	#4/5, 1987	#52, 1987	Takatoshi Yamada	
Offside (オフサイド)	#6, 1987	#17, 1992	Natsuko Heiuchi	
Mune Kyun Keiji (胸キュン刑事)	#15, 1987	#24, 1988	Hikaru Tohyama	
Ogami Matsugorou (おがみ松吾郎)	#25, 1987	#20, 1990	Minoru Itō	
Break Shot (ブレイクショット)	#26, 1987	#28, 1990	Takeshi Maekawa	
Chenji (チェンジ)	#31, 1987	#30, 1988	Yu Koyama	
Signal Blue (シグナルブルー)	#43, 1987	#6, 1988	George Morikawa	
Meimon! Daisan-yakyubu (名門!第三野球部)	#47, 1987	#25, 1993	Toshiyuki Mutsu	
Gekiretsu Baka (激烈バカ)	#6, 1988	#21/22, 1994	Fujio Saitō	
Super Doctor K (スーパードクターK, Sūpādokutā Ke)	#17, 1988	#42, 1996	Kazuo Mafune	
Myoden Ray (明王伝レイ, Myōōden Rei)	#25, 1988	#35, 1989	Toshiwo Kikuchi	
Kira Kira! (キラキラ!)	#1/2, 1989	#25, 1990	Tetsu Adachi	
Kanojo wa Delicate! (彼女はデリケート!)	#3/4, 1989	#9, 1991	Takeshi Kajiwara	
Aitsu wa Ainshutain (あいつはアインシュタイン)	#5, 1989	#23, 1989	Ishigaki Yūki, Miyazaki Masaru	
TV Jakkā (TVジャッカー)	#15, 1989	#33, 1989	Kaoru Kawakata	
Yokohama Meibutsu: Otoko Katayama-gumi! (横浜名物男片山組!)	#16, 1989	#52, 1991	Akira Yazawa	
Adesugata Junjō Boy (艶姿純情BOY)	#24, 1989	#7, 1990	Tooru Fujisawa	
From M	#35, 1989	#44, 1989	Kain Makino	
Kaze no Sylphid (風のシルフィード)	#41, 1989	#49, 1993	Yukihisa Motoshima	
Hard Cop	#42, 1989	#1, 1990	Takeshi Shibuta, Daisuke Yamaguchi	
Hajime no Ippo (はじめの一歩)	#43, 1989	Present	George Morikawa	

== 1990s ==
=== 1990–1994 ===
Manga	First Issue	Final Issue	Manga artist	Notes
Freedom	#2/3, 1990	#17, 1990	Kinichi Hashimoto	
Neko de Gomen! (猫でごめん!)	#12, 1990	#39, 1990	Akane Nagano	
Chameleon (カメレオン)	#17, 1990	#10, 2000	Atsushi Kano	
Shi no White Magic (死のホワイトマジック, Shi no Howaito Majikku)	#18, 1990	#53, 1990	Kōdai Kadomatsu	
Hassaku! Twins (はっさく!Twins)	#28, 1990	#42, 1990	Yūsuke Mihara	
MMR Magazine Mystery Research Group (MMR マガジンミステリー調査班, MMR Magajin Misuterī Chōsa-han)	#34, 1990	#42, 1999	Yūki Ishigaki	
Warashi (WARASHI)	#35, 1990	#27, 1991	Daisuke Terasawa	
Shoot! (シュート!, Shūto)	#36, 1990	#24, 2003	Tsukasa Ooshima	
Tobidase Stewardess! (飛びだせスチュワーデス!, Tobidase Suchuwādesu)	#41, 1990	#26, 1991	Takashi Oguro	
Hakkeyoi (はっけよい)	#42, 1990	#18, 1991	Takeshi Maekawa, Taro Nami	
Shonan Junai Gumi (湘南純愛組!)	#43, 1990	#42, 1996	Tooru Fujisawa	Licensed in English as GTO: The Early Years by Tokyopop in 2005. Republished by Vertical in 2011.
Viva! Judo Gurentai (ビバ!柔道愚連隊, Biba! Jūdō Gurentai)	#1, 1991	#1/2, 1993	Nishi Nisshī	
Kin no Henachoko (ポチのへなちょこ大作戦)	#3/4, 1991	#13, 1995	Hideo Nishimoto	
Hakaiou Noritaka! (破壊王ノリタカ!)	#14, 1991	#28, 1994	Takashi Hamori	
Rosutaimu (ロスタイム)	#17, 1991	#32, 1991	Kazuya Itō	
Combat ★ High School (コンバット★ハイスクール)	#19, 1991	#15, 1992	Akane Nagano	
Kaze Densetsu: Bukkomi no Taku (疾風伝説 特攻の拓)	#26, 1991	#32, 1997	Jūzō Tokoro, Hiroto Saki	
Captain Kid (キャプテンキッド)	#32, 1991	#21/22, 1992	Hiroshi Uno	
Boys Be...	#33, 1991	#15, 2001	Hiroyuki Tamakoshi, Masahiro Itabashi	
Haou Densetsu Takeru (覇王伝説 驍)	#43, 1991	#34, 1995	Yuzuru Shimazaki	
Sho -Show- (将 -ショウ-, Shō – Shō -)	#1/2, 1992	#35/36, 1992	Shuichi Shigeno	
Splash!!	#5, 1992	#20/21, 1992	Takeshi Kajiwara	
Kamashitarankai!! (かましたらんかい!!)	#18, 1992	#31, 1992	Takeshi Kōno	
Shōnen yo Racket o Dake (少年よラケットを抱け)	#23, 1992	#27, 1994	Tetsuya Chiba	
Tousho Lion (トウショウライオン, Tōshō Raion)	#24, 1992	#1/2, 1993	Hitoshi Araki	
Parallel Buster (パラレル・バスター, Parareru Basutā)	#26, 1992	#35/36, 1992	Shōji Kinoshita	
Shōta no Sushi (将太の寿司)	#37, 1992	#16, 1997	Daisuke Terasawa	
The Kindaichi Case Files (金田一少年の事件簿, Kindaichi Shōnen no Jikenbo)	#45, 1992	#46, 2017	Fumiya Satō, Seimaru Amagi, Yōzaburō Kanari	File series published in English by Tokyopop.
J-Dream (Jドリーム)	#3/4, 1993	#44, 1999	Natsuko Heiuchi	
Jiken Rettō Buru (事件列島ブル)	#5, 1993	#20, 1993	Michinori Okutani, Hideo Yokoyama	
Hi5!	#17, 1993	#24, 1994	Naomasa Matsuda	
Let's Nupu Nupu (LET'S ぬぷぬぷっ)	#19, 1993	#49, 1999	Akira Mitsumori	
Karate Aho Ichodaime Tsuyoku Nariagare! (空手アホ一代目 強く成り上がれ!)	#21/22, 1993	#41, 1993	Hirofumi Sawada	
Marasonman (マラソンマン)	#26, 1993	#5/6, 1997	Masaharu Inōe	
Dakara kimi ni Kiss!! (だからキミにKiss!!)	#33, 1993	#49, 1993	Takayuki Hirasawa	
Dr. Noguchi: Shinkaishaku No Noguchi Hideyo Monogatari (Dr.NOGUCHI 新解釈の野口英世物語)	#50, 1993	#8, 1997	Toshiyuki Mutsu	
Gakkō no Kowai Uwasa (学校の怖い噂)	#15, 1994	#3/4, 1995	Miyuki Hita, Tadashi Agi	
A.I. Love You (A・Iが止まらない! AI ga Tomaranai!)	#18, 1994	#40, 1994	Ken Akamatsu	Published in English by Tokyopop.
Ningen Datte Animō (人間だってアニモー)	#25, 1994	#35, 1994	Hidetoshi Sakamoto	
Maya (MAYA 真夜中の少女)	#30, 1994	#11, 1996	Yukihisa Motoshima	
Harlem Beat	#34, 1994	#8, 2000	Yuriko Nishiyama	Published in English by Tokyopop. From volume 12 onwards it was retitled as Rebound.
Hiseki Senki Stone Buster! (秘石戦記ストーンバスター!, Hiseki Senki Sutōn Basutā!)	#35, 1994	#16, 1995	Hiroshi Uno	
Shin Kotaro Makaritoru! Juudouhen (新・コータローまかりとおる! 柔道編)	#38, 1994	#7, 2001	Tatsuya Hiruta	
Atama ga Big Bang!! (頭がビッグバン!!, Atama ga Bigguban!!)	#40, 1994	#29, 1995	Fujio Saitō	

=== 1995–1999 ===
Manga	First Issue	Final Issue	Manga artist	Notes
Tamashī no Ken (魂の剣)	#1/2, 1995	#18, 1995	Takashi Hamori	
Henachoko Daisakusen Z (へなちょこ大作戦Z)	#14, 1995	#48, 2003	Hideo Nishimoto	
Ikumi no Himitsu (イクミの秘密)	#18, 1995	#3/4, 1996	Tai Okada	
Shibaitaretaka! (シバいたれタカ!)	#20, 1995	#12, 1996	Hirofumi Sawada	
Flip!	#26, 1995	#42, 1995	Sachiko Imoto	
Yappari Aishiteiru Noni! (やっぱり愛しているのに!)	#31, 1995	#40, 1995	Aikyō Sakamotomaru	
Nō Miso Purun (脳みそプルン!)	#41, 1995	#38, 2002	Kengo Kawaguchi	
Chūka Ichiban! (中華一番!)	#43, 1995	#24, 1996	Etsushi Ogawa	
Office Rei (心霊調査室OFFICE麗)	#45, 1995	#18, 1996	Hideki Nonomura, Sanae Miyau	
Bad Company (バッドカンパニー, Baddo Kanpanī)	#2, 1996	#33, 1996	Tooru Fujisawa	
Best Eleven (ベストイレブン, Besuto Irebun)	#2, 1996	#25, 1996	Makoto Izumi	
1000-Nen no Hayate (1000年の疾風)	#17, 1996	#32, 1996	Mitsuo Kimura, Kisuke Manjōme	
Psychometrer Eiji (サイコメトラーEIJI)	#18, 1996	#42, 2000	Masashi Asaki, Yuma Ando	
Tenkafubu Nobunaga (TENKAFUBU 信長)	#23, 1996	#6, 1998	Yuka Nagate	
Desperado	#26, 1996	#22/23, 1997	Daiji Matsumoto	
Dreams	#36/37, 1996	#47, 2003	Sanbanchi Kawa, Taro Nami	
Aoki Shinwa Mars (蒼き神話マルス)	#43, 1996	#24, 1999	Yukihisa Motoshima	
Doctor K	#43, 1996	#45, 1998	Kazuo Mafune	
Game Creator Retsuden (ゲームクリエイター列伝, Gēmu Kurieitā Retsuden)	#48, 1996	#53, 2000	Takayuki Hirasawa	
Boys Be... 2nd Season	#49, 1996	#39, 1999	Masahiro Itabashi, Hiroyuki Tamakoshi	Published in English by Tokyopop.
Shin Chūka Ichiban! (真・中華一番!)	#1, 1997	#22/23, 1999	Etsushi Ogawa	
Great Teacher Onizuka (GTO)	#2, 1997	#9, 2002	Tooru Fujisawa	Published in English by Tokyopop.
Ue wo Muite Arukou (上を向いて歩こう)	#17, 1997	#48, 1997	Toshiyuki Mutsu	
Shōta no Sushi: Zenkokutaikai-hen (将太の寿司〜全国大会編〜)	#19, 1997	#34, 2000	Daisuke Terasawa	
Gachinko! (ガチンコッ!)	#25, 1997	#18, 1998	Tetsuo Yamashita	
Legendary Gambler Tetsuya (哲也-雀聖と呼ばれた男, Shoubushi Densetsu Tetsuya)	#33, 1997	#2/3, 2005	Yasushi Hoshino, Fūmei Sai	
Shake Down	#42, 1997	#7, 1998	Iyo Haruyoshi	
Ningen Kyouki Katsuo! (人間凶器カツオ!)	#43, 1997	#34, 1999	Takashi Hamori	
Eien no Uta (永遠の詩)	#6, 1998	#16, 1999	Hiroto Saki	
G-Hard	#8, 1998	#28, 1999	Jūzō Tokoro, Buronson	
Max Ōta (MAX太田)	#21, 1998	#33, 1998	Kijima Satoshi	
Policeman	#25, 1998	#46, 1999	Masaharu Inoue	
Love Hina (ラブひな)	#47, 1998	#48, 2001	Ken Akamatsu	Licensed in English by Tokyopop in 2001 and republished in an omnibus edition by Kodansha USA in 2011.
High Life	#8, 1999	#22/23, 1999	Makoto Izumi	
Kimun Kamui (キムンカムイ)	#12, 1999	#51, 1999	Yoshihiro Saegusa	
GetBackers (ゲットバッカーズ -奪還屋-, Gettobakkāzu Dakkan'ya)	#17, 1999	#12, 2007	Rando Ayamine, Yuya Aoki	Published in English by Tokyopop.
Samurai Deeper Kyo (サムライ ディーパー キョウ, Samurai Dīpā Kyō)	#26, 1999	#23, 2006	Akimine Kamijyo	Published in English by Tokyopop.
Rave Master (レイヴ, Reivu)	#32, 1999	#35, 2005	Hiro Mashima	Licensed in English by Tokyopop in 2002 and digitally published by Kodansha USA in 2017.
Naku yo Uguisu (泣くようぐいす)	#35, 1999	#45, 2000	Yasuaki Kita	
Tsuri ni Ikou ze!! (釣りに行こうぜ!!)	#44, 1999	#21, 2000	Kazumasa Mori	
Telome Terumi Tell Me (テルミ×テルミ×テルミ)	#48, 1999	#19, 2000	Tai Okada, Hiroto Saki	
Snow Dolphin (スノードルフィン)	#50, 1999	#18, 2000	Tomoyo Ohishi, Jyoji Arimori	

== 2000s ==
=== 2000–2004 ===
Manga	First Issue	Final Issue	Manga artist	Notes
Mushimaro! (むしまろ!)	#1, 2000	#8, 2001	Tetsuro Yanagisawa	
Ryouma e (龍馬へ)	#7, 2000	#21/22, 2001	Toshiyuki Mutsu	
Gin no Kodou (銀の鼓動)	#11, 2000	#26, 2000	Akira Yanagiha	
Buraiden Gai (無頼伝 涯)	#16, 2000	#8, 2001	Nobuyuki Fukumoto	
Boys Be... L Co-op	#17, 2000	#15, 2001	Masahiro Itabashi, Hiroyuki Tamakoshi	
Date Groove (伊達グルーヴ)	#20, 2000	#34, 2000	Eijirō Shimada	
Sora no Subaru (空の昴)	#24, 2000	#44, 2003	Yukihisa Motoshima	
Raijin – Rising (雷神〜RISING〜)	#27, 2000	#12, 2001	Kazuo Mafune	
Cromartie High School (魁!!クロマティ高校, Sakigake!! Cromartie High School)	#34, 2000	#24, 2006	Eiji Nonaka	Published in English by ADV Manga.
Peak	#35, 2000	#49, 2000	Yuka Nagate, Hideo Yokoyama	
Pori-kou Man (ポリ公マン)	#37/38, 2000	#28, 2001	Atsushi Kase	
Susume! Daini Shounen Kouka Gakkou (突撃め!第二少年工科学校)	#40, 2000	#24, 2001	Jūzō Tokoro	
Hot Shot (Hot Shot)	#46, 2000	#27, 2001	Junji Oono	
Idaten (フィールド最速伝説IDATEN -韋駄天-)	#50, 2000	#14, 2001	Tetsuo Yamashita	
Kunimitsu no Matsuri (クニミツの政)	#3, 2001	#45, 2005	Masashi Asaki, Yuma Ando	
Dragon Voice (ドラゴン ボイス, Doragon Boisu)	#7, 2001	#8, 2003	Yuriko Nishiyama	Published in English by Tokyopop.
Jipangu Hououden (ジパング宝王伝)	#9, 2001	#24, 2001	Etsushi Ogawa, Kazutoshi Ozasa	
Howling	#14, 2001	#26, 2001	Takeshi Hinata	
GodHand Teru (ゴッドハンド輝)	#16, 2001	#45, 2011	Kazuki Yamamoto	
Gekidan Kujira-goroshi (劇団鯨ごろし)	#17, 2001	#30, 2001	Hide Matsumoto	
Kuwasemon! (喰わせモン!)	#18, 2001	#51, 2001	Daisuke Terasawa	
Gorio (霊長類最強伝説 ゴリ夫)	#20, 2001	#31, 2002	Takashi Hamori	
Kotaro Makaritoru! L (コータローまかりとおる! L)	#24, 2001	#36/37, 2002	Tatsuya Hiruta	
Tantei Gakuen Q (探偵学園Q)	#25, 2001	#34, 2005	Fumiya Satō, Seimaru Amagi	
Road: Kagayakeru Michi (ROAD〜輝ける道〜)	#28, 2001	#1, 2002	Natsuko Heiuchi	
Big Star Daikichi (Big Star 大吉)	#31, 2001	#2/3, 2002	Akira Tsubaki	
3.3.7 Byooshi!! (3.3.7ビョーシ!!)	#34, 2001	#28, 2003	Mitsurō Kubo	
One Room (わんるーむ, Wanru ̄ mu)	#40, 2001	#34, 2003	Akira Mitsumori	
Assobot Goku (アソボット五九)	#4/5, 2002	#44, 2002	Romu Aoi, Jyoji Arimori	Transferred to Magazine Special.
Daihyoubito (代表人)	#11, 2002	#24, 2002	Yasuaki Kita	
Jump Man (JUMP MAN〜ふたりの大障害〜)	#15, 2002	#33, 2002	Masaharu Inōe	Transferred to Magazine Special.
Soccer Keru Keru Dan (サッカーけるける団, Sakkā Keru Keru-dan)	#17, 2002	#28, 2002	Eijirō Shimada	
Jigoro Jigorou (ジゴロ次五郎)	#22, 2002	#30, 2007	Atsushi Kase	
Cross Over	#25, 2002	#40, 2003	Kōji Seo	
Keinu Densetsu Gōgōgorō! (蹴犬伝説ゴーゴーゴロー!)	#27, 2002	#48, 2002	Taro Sada	
Kaze no Jūshi (風の柔士)	#29, 2002	#48, 2002	Kazuo Mafune	
Pastel (ぱすてる)	#32, 2002	#33, 2003	Toshihiko Kobayashi	Transferred to Magazine Special. Published in English by Del Rey Manga.
Gacha Gacha (ガチャガチャ)	#36/37, 2002	#29, 2003	Hiroyuki Tamakoshi	Transferred to Magazine Special. Published in English by Del Rey Manga.
Road: Futatsu no Taiyō (ROAD〜ふたつの太陽〜)	#42, 2002	#50, 2002	Natsuko Heiuchi	
Chanbara (チャンバラ 一撃小僧隼十)	#45, 2002	#12, 2003	Yoshinobu Yamada	
School Rumble (スクールランブル, Sukūru Ranburu)	#47, 2002	#34, 2008	Jin Kobayashi	Licensed in English by Del Rey Manga in 2006. Published digitally by Kodansha USA in 2016.
Air Gear (エア・ギア, Ea Gia)	#49, 2002	#25, 2012	Oh! Great	Licensed in English by Del Rey Manga in 2006. Acquired by Kodansha USA in 2010 and published in an omnibus edition for volumes 1–18 in 2012.
Gold Rush! (GOLDRASH!)	#50, 2002	#15, 2003	Tetsuo Yamashita	
Shichisan Megane (シチサンメガネ)	#9, 2003	#27, 2003	Shin Kaneyama	
Negima! Magister Negi Magi (魔法先生ネギま, Mahō Sensei Negima!)	#13, 2003	#15, 2012	Ken Akamatsu	Licensed in English by Del Rey Manga in 2003. Published by Kodansha USA in 2011.
Wild Baseballers	#17, 2003	#21, 2004	Tarō Sekiguchi, Tooru Fujisawa	
Tobaku-shi Fukurō (賭博師 梟)	#21/22, 2003	#29, 2003	Yasushi Hoshino, Fūmei Sai	
Tsubasa: Reservoir Chronicle (ツバサ-RESERVoir CHRoNiCLE-, Tsubasa: Rezaboa Kuronikuru)	#25, 2003	#45, 2009	CLAMP	Licensed in English by Del Rey Manga in 2003. Published by Kodansha USA in an omnibus edition in 2014.
Densetsu no Head Shō (伝説の頭 翔)	#34, 2003	#33, 2005	Takashi Hamori, Takeshi Natsuhara	
Joshidaisei Kateikyoushi Hamanaka Ai (女子大生家庭教師濱中アイ)	#40, 2003	#16, 2006	Tozen Ujiie	
Ore wa Captain (おれはキャプテン)	#41, 2003	#1, 2005	Jōkura Koji	
Tanpo (たんぽ)	#43, 2003	#52, 2003	Hiroaki Wakamiya	
Tensai Ryouri Shounen: Aji no Suke (天才料理少年 味の助)	#47, 2003	#38, 2004	Sōda Gō	
Food Hunter Futaraiden (フードハンター双雷伝)	#52, 2003	#22/23, 2004	Etsushi Ogawa, Kazutoshi Ozasa	
Kiseki no Shōnen (奇跡の少年)	#1, 2004	#41, 2004	Junichi Nōjō	
Ahiru no Sora (あひるの空)	#2/3, 2004	Present (on hiatus)	Takeshi Hinata	
Tokkyū!! (トッキュー!!)	#6, 2004	#33, 2008	Mitsurō Kubo, Yoichi Komori	
Garōden Boy (餓狼伝BOY)	#7, 2004	#32, 2004	Keisuke Itagaki, Baku Yumemakura	
Menou Futatsuki! (麺王フタツキ!)	#8, 2004	#27, 2004	Shinji Saijyo	
Suzuka (涼風)	#12, 2004	#42, 2007	Kōji Seo	Licensed in English by Del Rey Manga in 2006. Published digitally by Kodansha USA in 2016.
Changing Now (チェンジング・ナウ)	#22/23, 2004	#34, 2005	Uma	
Stay Gold (STAY GOLD)	#24, 2004	#49, 2004	Tsukasa Ooshima	
M.I.Q.	#32, 2004	#9, 2005	Shingo Asai	
Haou no Ken (覇王の剣)	#40, 2004	#21/22, 2005	Natsuko Heiuchi	
Mō, Shimasen Kara (もう、しませんから。)	#40, 2004	#23, 2012	Hideo Nishimoto	
Full Tama (フルたま)	#43, 2004	#6, 2005	Eisei Takaoka	
Kami to Sengoku Seitokai (神to戦国生徒会)	#51, 2004	#42, 2006	Ryōsuke Takada, Satoru Akahori	

=== 2005–2009 ===
Manga	First Issue	Final Issue	Manga artist	Notes
Toto!: The Wonderful Adventure (トト! the wonderful adventure)	#2/3, 2005	#46, 2005	Yūkō Osada	Published in English by Del Rey Manga.
Any MR (あにMR)	#7, 2005	#38, 2005	Taro Sada	
Sumire 17 sai!! (スミレ♡17歳!!)	#17, 2005	#43, 2005	Takeru Nagayoshi	
Vinland Saga (ヴィンランド・サガ, Vinrando Saga)	#20, 2005	#45, 2005	Makoto Yukimura	Transferred to Monthly Afternoon. Published in English by Kodansha USA.
Rose Hip Zero	#21, 2005	#15, 2006	Tooru Fujisawa	Published in English by Tokyopop.
Sayonara, Zetsubou-Sensei (さよなら絶望先生)	#22/23, 2005	#28, 2012	Koji Kumeta	Licensed in English by Del Rey Manga in 2008. Acquired by Kodansha USA in 2010.
Over Drive	#24, 2005	#24, 2008	Tsuyoshi Yasuda	
Full Spec (Full Spec)	#28, 2005	#9, 2006	Taro Sekiguchi	
Kenkō Zenrakei Suieibu Umishō (ケンコー全裸系水泳部 ウミショー)	#33, 2005	#21/22, 2008	Mitsuru Hattori	
Koma Koma (コマコマ)	#36/37, 2005	#10, 2006	Shōki Yonebayashi	
90-Eko to Issho. (090〜えこといっしょ〜)	#38, 2005	#50, 2006	Maru Asakura	
Bokura no Sengoku Hakkyuuden (ぼくらの戦国白球伝)	#46, 2005	#20, 2006	Seiji Uozumi	
Fashion Leader Imai Shoutarou (ファッションリーダー今井正太郎)	#48, 2005	#30, 2006	Yūta Nishiyama	
Crack!! (クラック!!)	#53, 2005	#15, 2006	Keisuke Honna	
Shounen Mushuku Shinkurou (少年無宿シンクロウ)	#1, 2006	#1, 2007	Yasushi Hoshino, Fūmei Sai	
Gaijin (街刃-GAIJIN-)	#10, 2006	#49, 2006	Satoaki Amatatsu	
IWGP – Denshi no Hoshi (IWGP 電子の星)	#14, 2006	#23, 2006	Masashi Asaki	
Magnum Rose Hip	#18, 2006	#28, 2006	Tooru Fujisawa	
The Knight in the Area (エリアの騎士, Eria no Kishi)	#21/22, 2006	#17, 2017	Kaya Tsukiyama, Hiroaki Igano	
Sumire 16 sai!! (スミレ♡16歳!!)	#23, 2006	#49, 2006	Takeru Nagayoshi	
Ace of Diamond (ダイヤのA, Daiya no A)	#24, 2006	#7, 2015	Yūji Terajima	Published digitally by Kodansha USA.
Idol no Akahon (アイドルのあかほん)	#28, 2006	#48, 2006	Tozen Ujiie	
Kakutou Ryourinin Musashi (格闘料理人ムサシ)	#29, 2006	#52, 2006	Takashi Hamori	
Smash! (スマッシュ!)	#33, 2006	#20, 2010	Kaori Saki	
Fairy Tail	#35, 2006	#34, 2017	Hiro Mashima	Licensed in English by Del Rey Manga in 2007. Acquired by Kodansha USA in 2010.
Shinyaku "Kyojin no Hoshi" Hanagata (新約「巨人の星」花形)	#36/37, 2006	#4/5, 2011	Yoshiyuki Murakami, Ikki Kajiwara, Noboru Kawasaki	
Mirai Chonaikai (未来町内会)	#38, 2006	#19, 2008	Eiji Nonaka	
Kamen Rider wo Tsukutta Otokotachi (仮面ライダーをつくった男たち)	#43, 2006	#28, 2007	Kenichi Muraeda	
Flunk Punk Rumble (ヤンキー君とメガネちゃん, Yankee-kun to Megane-chan)	#46, 2006	#25, 2011	Miki Yoshikawa	
Hammer Session! (ハンマーセッション!)	#50, 2006	#2/3, 2009	Namoshiro Tanahashi, Hiroyuki Yatsu, Yamato Koganemaru	
Joppare Shun! (マグロ一本釣り伝説 じょっぱれ瞬!)	#52, 2006	#10, 2007	Hiroshi Wakamatsu, Yoshiaki Sasaki	
Shibatora (シバトラ)	#2/3, 2007	#46, 2009	Yuma Ando, Masashi Asaki	
Youkai no Oisha-san (妖怪のお医者さん)	#13, 2007	#35, 2008	Yūki Satō	
Bloody Monday	#17, 2007	#20, 2009	Ryumon Ryo, Megumi Kōji	Published in English by Kodansha USA.
Kiss & Cry! (キス☆クラ)	#24, 2007	#40, 2007	Akira Segami	
Shirogane no Karasu (しろがねの鴉)	#26, 2007	#51, 2007	Akimine Kamijyo	
Kanojo to Kiss Suru 50 no Hōhō (彼女とキスする50の方法)	#37, 2007	#39, 2007	Seiji Yamane, Yoshiki Kasai	
Gambling Emperor Legend Zero (賭博覇王伝 零, Tobaku Haōden Zero)	#40, 2007	#13, 2009	Nobuyuki Fukumoto	Published digitally in English by Manga Planet in 2020.
Baby Steps (ベイビーステップ, Beibī Suteppu)	#46, 2007	#48, 2017	Hikaru Kachiki	
Tetsuwan Break (鉄腕ブレイク)	#6, 2008	#18, 2008	Tomohiro Shinohara	
Stand by Me (スタンドバイミー)	#15, 2008	#31, 2008	Takahiro Oba	
Hakkutsu! Magazine Yarou!! (発掘!マガジン野郎!!)	#19, 2008	#1, 2009	Yuki Okada	
Kagutsuchi (カグツチ)	#25, 2008	#45, 2008	Akira Ishiguro, Masaya Hokazono	
A Town Where You Live (君のいる町, Kimi no iru machi)	#26, 2008	#11, 2014	Kōji Seo	Published digitally in English by Crunchyroll Manga.
Code: Breaker (CØDE:BREAKER コード: ブレイカー, Kōdo:Bureikā)	#28, 2008	#33, 2013	Akimine Kamijyo	Published in English by Del Rey Manga.
Zerosen (ゼロセン)	#34, 2008	#36/37, 2010	Atsushi Kase	
Seitokai Yakuindomo (生徒会役員共)	#34, 2008	#51, 2021	Tozen Ujiie	Transferred from Magazine Special.
Junjou Karen na Oretachi da! (純情カレンな俺達だ!)	#40, 2008	#13, 2009	Yuriko Nishiyama	
Shigyaku Keiyakusha Fausts (弑逆契約者ファウスツ)	#46, 2008	#27, 2009	Yasushi Hoshino	
Cage of Eden (エデンの檻, Eden no Ori)	#52, 2008	#8, 2013	Yoshinobu Yamada	Published in English by Kodansha USA.
Brass Boy! (暴走系吹奏楽列伝 ブラボー! Brass Boy)	#14, 2009	#38, 2009	Yumika Tsuru	
Mash Go!! (マッシュGO!!)	#15, 2009	#29, 2009	Shōki Yonebayashi, Yoichi Komori	
Daikusei Kuuki Heishidan (第九征空騎兵師團)	#20, 2009	#52, 2009	Masato Fujisaki	
Gamaran (我間乱〜GAMARAN〜)	#24, 2009	#30, 2013	Yōsuke Nakamaru	
GTO: 14 Days in Shonan	#28, 2009	#42, 2011	Tooru Fujisawa	Published in English by Vertical.
Namiuchigiwa no Muromi-san (波打際のむろみさん)	#33, 2009	#26, 2014	Keiji Najima	
Double J (だぶるじぇい, Daburu Jei)	#34, 2009	#48, 2011	Maru Asakura	
Tiji-kun! (ティジクン!)	#36, 2009	#6, 2010	Ken Oojiba, Masahiko Yokoyama	
Kachou Reijou (課長令嬢)	#37, 2009	#34, 2010	Hironari Takachi	
GE – Good Ending (GE〜グッドエンディング〜, GE ~ Guddo Endingu ~)	#38, 2009	#6, 2013	Kei Sasuga	Published digitally in English by Kodansha USA.
Bloody Monday Season 2 ~Pandora no Hako~	#46, 2009	#21, 2011	Ryumon Ryo, Megumi Kōji	
A-bout!	#52, 2009	#15, 2014	Masa Ichikawa	

== 2010s ==
=== 2010–2014 ===
Manga	First Issue	Final Issue	Manga artist	Notes
Black Out	#14, 2010	#47, 2010	Masashi Asaki, Ryū Kisaragi	
Oniwaka to Ushiwaka Edge of the World (鬼若と牛若 Edge of the World)	#21, 2010	#27, 2010	Rando Ayamine, Yuya Aoki	
Hammer Session! In High School (ハンマーセッション! In High School)	#26, 2010	#49, 2010	Namoshiro Tanahashi	
AKB49: Ren'ai Kinshi Jōrei (AKB49〜恋愛禁止条例〜)	#39, 2010	#8, 2016	Reiji Miyajima, Motoazabu Factory	
Bun Bun Bee	#46, 2010	#9, 2011	Satoshi Enomoto	
Furimuku na Kimi ha (振り向くな君は)	#1, 2011	#33, 2011	Tsuyoshi Yasuda	
My Girlfriend is a Fiction (この彼女はフィクションです, Kono Kanojo wa Fikushon desu)	#11, 2011	#45, 2011	Shizumu Watanabe	
Zeus no Tane (ゼウスの種)	#12, 2011	#43, 2012	Kōsuke Iijima	
Again!! (アゲイン!!, Agein!!)	#19, 2011	#19, 2014	Mitsurō Kubo	Published in English by Kodansha USA.
Phi Brain: Saigo no Puzzle (ファイ・ブレイン 最期のパズル)	#22/23, 2011	#46, 2011	Yuji Moritaka, Haruki Ueno	
Bakudan! – Bakumatsu Danshi (ばくだん!〜幕末男子〜)	#26, 2011	#44, 2012	Atsushi Kase	
Bloody Monday Final Season	#29, 2011	#17, 2012	Kōji Megumi, Tadashi Agi	
Tobaku Haōden Zero: Gyanki-hen (賭博覇王伝 零 ギャン鬼編)	#33, 2011	#26, 2013	Nobuyuki Fukumoto	
Dragon Collection: Ryū o Suberu Mono (ドラゴンコレクション 竜を統べるもの)	#40, 2011	#42, 2012	Kyōta Shibano, Muneyuki Kaneshiro	
Sherlock Bones (探偵犬シャードック, Tanteiken Shādokku)	#47, 2011	#52, 2012	Yūki Satō, Yuma Ando	Published in English by Kodansha USA.
Star Children	#53, 2011	#16, 2012	Masashi Kida	
Happy Project (ハッピープロジェクト)	#4/5, 2012	#38, 2012	Hirokazu Ochiai	
Yamada-kun and the Seven Witches (山田くんと7人の魔女, Yamada-kun to nana-nin no Majo)	#12, 2012	#12, 2017	Miki Yoshikawa	Published in English by Kodansha USA.
Dr. Duo (Dr.デュオ)	#21/22, 2012	#11, 2013	Yūsuke Ōsawa	
Chotto Morimashita. (ちょっと盛りました。)	#28, 2012	#29, 2014	Hideo Nishimoto	
GT-R	#30, 2012	#44, 2012	Tooru Fujisawa	
My Wife is Wagatsuma-san (我妻さんは俺のヨメ, Wagatsuma-san ha ore no Yome)	#42, 2012	#43, 2014	Keishi Nishikida, Yū Kuraishi	Published digitally in English by Crunchyroll Manga and Kodansha USA.
The Seven Deadly Sins (七つの大罪, Nanatsu no Taizai)	#45, 2012	#17, 2020	Nakaba Suzuki	Published in English by Kodansha USA.
Otokodama Rock (男魂ロック)	#46, 2012	#17, 2013	Satoshi Enomoto	
Rakugomon (ラクゴモン。)	#49, 2012	#12, 2013	Yoshiyuki Murakami	
Aho-Girl (アホガール, Aho Gāru)	#52, 2012	#12, 2015	Hiroyuki	Transferred to Bessatsu Shōnen Magazine. Published in English by Kodansha USA.
As the Gods Will: The Second Series (神さまの言うとおり弐, Kamisama no Iutōri II)	#7, 2013	#4/5, 2017	Akeji Fujimura, Muneyuki Kaneshiro	Published digitally in English by Crunchyroll Manga and Kodansha USA.
Makku Miran kōkō joshi kyōshiki yakyūbu (マックミラン高校女子硬式野球部)	#9, 2013	#33, 2013	Tatsurō Suga	
Kyō no Onna Bare (今日の女バレ)	#9, 2013	#32, 2013	Kai Kobayashi	
Takara no Zen (タカラの膳)	#13, 2013	#35, 2013	Kazuki Yamamoto, Kanji Sorasaki	
Acma: Game	#19, 2013	#14, 2017	Meeb, Kōji Megumi	
Days	#21/22, 2013	#8, 2021	Tsuyoshi Yasuda	Published digitally in English by Kodansha USA.
Hangyaku no kagetsukai (反逆の影使い)	#25, 2013	#39, 2013	Shin Kanzaki	
Last Man (LASTMAN -ラストマン-)	#27, 2013	#49, 2013	Yūji Ninomiya	
A Silent Voice (聲の形, Koe no katachi)	#36/37, 2013	#51, 2014	Yoshitoki Ōima	Published in English by Kodansha USA.
UQ Holder!	#39, 2013	#30, 2016	Ken Akamatsu	Transferred to Bessatsu Shōnen Magazine. Published in English by Kodansha USA.
Charon	#42, 2013	#4/5, 2014	Yoshinobu Yamada	
Hello!!	#45, 2013	#8, 2014	Daisuke Miyata	
Rivnes (りぶねす, Ribunesu)	#48, 2013	#1, 2014	Yuki Domoto	
Sekkachi Hakushaku to Jikan Dorobou (せっかち伯爵と時間どろぼう)	#49, 2013	#6, 2015	Kouji Kumeta	
Soredemo Boku wa Kimi ga Suki (それでも僕は君が好き)	#2/3, 2014	#27, 2014	Nao Emoto, Suu Itin	Transferred to Bessatsu Shōnen Magazine.
Kimi o Mawashitai. (君を回したい)	#9, 2014	#17, 2014	Tarako Umeyama	
Fuuka (風夏, Fūka)	#11, 2014	#18, 2018	Kōji Seo	Published digitally in English by Crunchyroll Manga and Kodansha USA.
Seishun Shônen Magazine (青春少年マガジン -紙の翼-)	#12, 2014	#21/22, 2014	Natsuko Heiuchi	
Profesional Henshûsha no Yûgi (プロフェッショナル編集者の流儀)	#12, 2014	#21/22, 2014	Yuki Okada	
Shinkai Tsuzuri no Dokkairoku (新海綴の読解録)	#14, 2014	#26, 2014	Kaoru Hakkai	
Domestic Girlfriend (ドメスティックな彼女, Domesutikku na Kanojo)	#21/22, 2014	#28, 2020	Kei Sasuga	Published digitally in English by Kodansha USA.
Tenkei no Arimaria (天啓のアリマリア)	#27, 2014	#39, 2014	Itora, Kenji Sakumoto	
Corp Shitsurakuen (コーポ失楽園)	#30, 2014	#43, 2014	Masakuni Igarashi	
Rupodama! (ルポ魂!)	#32, 2014	#20, 2016	Yuki Okada, Shinpei Funatsu	
Tetsu no Ou (鉄の王)	#36/37, 2014	#9, 2015	Takeshi Sano	
Komori-chan ha Yaruki wo Dase (こもりちゃんはヤる気を出せ)	#41, 2014	#44, 2015	Tohiro Konno	
Abe no Iru Machi (阿部のいる町)	#44, 2014	#15, 2015	Miyajima Masanori, Inoue Natsumi	
Rengoku no Karma (楝獄のカルマ)	#47, 2014	#35, 2015	Hirose Toshi, Haruba Negi	

=== 2015–2019 ===
Manga	First Issue	Final Issue	Manga artist	Notes
Real Account (リアルアカウント)	#4/5, 2015	#29, 2018	Shizumu Watanabe, Okushou	Transferred from and moved back to Bessatsu Shōnen Magazine. Published in English by Kodansha USA.
Masukomi (増すコミ)	#16, 2015	#1, 2016	Keiji Najima	
Pinkyu★★★ (ピンキュー★★★)	#19, 2015	#32, 2015	Sakuma Chikara	
Tsuredure Children (徒然チルドレン)	#20, 2015	#32, 2018	Toshiya Wakibayashi	Transferred from Bessatsu Shōnen Magazine. Published digitally in English by Kodansha USA.
Dekoboko Animation (凸凹アニメーション)	#27, 2015	#40, 2015	Miyajima Masanori, Igarashi Masakuni	
Daigo Tokusou (第伍特捜)	#33, 2015	#47, 2015	Enji Tetta	
Desert Eagle (デザートイーグル)	#36/37, 2015	#25, 2016	Ken Wakui	
Ace of Diamond Act II (ダイヤのA act II, Daiya no A Act II)	#38, 2015	#48, 2022	Yuji Terajima	
Two Three (ツースリー, Tsū Surī)	#40, 2015	#52, 2015	Kyu Takahata	
Fire Force (炎炎ノ消防隊, En'en no Shōbōtai)	#43, 2015	#13, 2022	Atsushi Ōkubo	Published in English by Kodansha USA.
Infection (インフェクション, Infekushon)	#1, 2016	#36, 2016	Tōru Oikawa	Transferred to Magazine Pocket.
Muteki no Hito (無敵の人)	#4/5, 2016	#28, 2016	Shinobu Kaitani	Transferred to Magazine Pocket.
Tenohira no Netsu wo (てのひらの熱を)	#10, 2016	#24, 2016	Eiichi Kitano	
Hoshino, Me wo Tsubutte. (星野、目をつぶって。)	#19, 2016	#32, 2018	Kohei Nagashii	
Vector Ball	#22/23, 2016	#16, 2017	Makoto Raiku	
Dr. Prisoner (Dr.プリズナー, Dr. Purizunā)	#27, 2016	#7, 2017	Komatsu Ishikawa, Atsuo Ueda	
Kono Ken ga Tsuki wo Kiru (この剣が月を斬る)	#31, 2016	#49, 2016	Horiuchi Atsunori	Transferred to Magazine Pocket.
Koisuru Suizoku-man (恋する水族マン)	#34, 2016	#53, 2016	Yū Abiko	
Mononote: Edo Shinobi Kagyō (もののて～江戸忍稼業～)	#37/38, 2016	#2/3, 2017	Reiji Miyajima	Transferred to Magazine Pocket.
Fullback (フルバック, Furubakku)	#42, 2016	#1, 2017	Matsuoka Yoshinori	
Senryū Shōjo (川柳少女)	#47, 2016	#21, 2020	Masakuni Igarashi	
To Your Eternity (不滅のあなたへ, Fumetsu no Anata e)	#50, 2016	#27, 2025	Yoshitoki Ōima	Published in English by Kodansha USA.
8-gatsu Outlaw (8月アウトロー)	#2/3, 2017	#35, 2017	Daisuke Miyata	
6 cm no Kizuna (6センチの絆, 6-senchii no Kizuna)	#4/5, 2017	#18, 2017	Shirou Adachi, Makoto Nakashima	
Ranker's High (ランカーズ・ハイ, Rankāzu Hai)	#10, 2017	#29, 2017	Ryō Nakajima	Transferred to Magazine Pocket.
Tokyo Revengers (東京卍リベンジャーズ, Tōkyō Ribenjāzu)	#13, 2017	#51, 2022	Ken Wakui	Published digitally in English by Kodansha USA.
High & Low: G-Sword	#16, 2017	#36/37, 2017	CLAMP	
Rakuraku Shinwa (楽々神話)	#18, 2017	#35, 2017	Tarō Tsubaki	
Ohayou Survive (おはようサバイブ, Ohayō Sabaibu)	#20, 2017	#36/37, 2017	Takeru Maehara	
Tsue Pechi Mahoutsukai♀no Bouken no Sho (杖ペチ魔法使い♀の冒険の書)	#24, 2017	#6, 2018	Awabako	
Smile Down the Runway (ランウェイで笑って, Ran'u~ei de Waratte)	#26, 2017	#33, 2021	Kotoba Inoya	Published digitally in English by Kodansha USA.
World End Crusaders (ワールドエンドクルセイダーズ, Wārudo Endo Kuruseidāzu)	#28, 2017	#1, 2018	Ryousuke Fuji, biki	
Rent-A-Girlfriend (彼女、お借りします, Kanojo, Okarishimasu)	#32, 2017	Present	Reiji Miyajima	Published in English by Kodansha USA.
Kessen no Kuon (血戦の九遠)	#35, 2017	#2/3, 2018	Yoshinori Matsuoka	
The Quintessential Quintuplets (五等分の花嫁, Go-Tōbun no Hanayome)	#36/37, 2017	#12, 2020	Negi Haruba	Published in English by Kodansha USA.
Seishun Soukanzu (青春相関図)	#40, 2017	#14, 2018	Shun Hirose, Kouta Sannomiya	
Boarding School Juliet (寄宿学校のジュリエット, Kishuku Gakkō no Jurietto)	#43, 2017	#40, 2019	Yōsuke Kaneda	Transferred from Bessatsu Shōnen Magazine; Published in English by Kodansha USA.
8-jou no Carnival (8畳カーニバル)	#50, 2017	#24, 2018	Kumichi Yoshizuki	
I Love You, My Teacher (先生、好きです。, Sensei, Suki Desu.)	#4/5, 2018	#28, 2018	Kouji Miura	Transferred to Magazine Pocket.
Bakemonogatari (化物語)	#15, 2018	#15, 2023	Nisio Isin, Oh! Great	Published in English by Vertical.
Kiss and Cry (キスアンドクライ, Kisu ando Kurai)	#18, 2018	#33, 2018	Nozomi Higasa	
She's Adopted a High School Boy! (男子高校生を養いたいお姉さんの話, Danshi Kōkōsei o Yashinaitai Onē-san no Hanashi)	#19, 2018	#18, 2022	Hideki	Published in English digitally by Kodansha (BookWalker Exclusive).
This Man: Sono Kao wo Mita Mono ni wa Shi wo (This Man その顔を見た者には死を)	#20/21, 2018	#48, 2018	Kōji Megumi, Sora Karin	Transferred to Magazine Pocket.
Orient (オリエント, Oriento)	#26, 2018	#6, 2021	Shinobu Ohtaka	Transferred to Bessatsu Shōnen Magazine. Published in English by Kodansha USA.
Hitman (ヒットマン, Hittoman)	#29, 2018	#12, 2021	Kōji Seo	
Edens Zero	#30, 2018	#30, 2024	Hiro Mashima	Published in English by Kodansha USA.
Yoru ni Naru to Boku wa (夜になると僕は)	#31, 2018	#15, 2019	Yū Masako	
Blue Lock (ブルーロック, Burū Rokku)	#35, 2018	Present	Mineyuki Kaneshiro, Yūsuke Nomura	Published digitally in English by Kodansha USA.
Gamblers Parade (ギャンブラーズパレード)	#45, 2018	#30, 2019	Atsushi Nakayama, Kazutaka Kodaka	
Shichiha Gojūroku (シチハゴジュウロク)	#48, 2018	#31, 2019	Tetsutaka Kudo, Mitomo Sasako	
When Will Ayumu Make His Move? (それでも歩は寄せてくる, Soredemo Ayumu wa Yosetekuru)	#14, 2019	#50, 2023	Sōichirō Yamamoto	Published in English by Kodansha USA.
Shinanaide! Asukawa-san (死なないで! 明日川さん)	#19, 2019	#46, 2019	Kyu Takahata	
Sen wa, Boku wo Egaku (線は、僕を描く)	#29, 2019	#11, 2020	Hiromasa Togami, Horiuchi Atsunori	
Kyoryuu Senki (巨竜戦記)	#35, 2019	#8, 2020	Shingo Honda	
Necromance (ネクロマンス)	#39, 2019	#16, 2020	Domoto Yuki	Transferred to Magazine Pocket.
Mashima Hero's	#46, 2019	#4, 2020	Hiro Mashima	Published in English by Kodansha USA.

== 2020s ==
=== 2020–2024 ===
Manga	First Issue	Final Issue	Manga artist	Notes
Reaper's Dice Game (死神サイ殺ゲーム, Shinigami Sai koro Game)	#1, 2020	#30, 2020	Monma Tsukasa, Ōmae Takafumi	
The Shadows of Who We Once Were (なれの果ての僕ら, Nare no Hate no Bokura)	#7, 2020	#48, 2020	Yae Utsumi	Transferred to Magazine Pocket. Published in English by Kodansha USA.
A Couple of Cuckoos (カッコウの許嫁, Kakkō no Iinazuke)	#9, 2020	Present	Miki Yoshikawa	
Xevec (ゼベック, Zebekku)	#11, 2020	#34, 2020	Shimouchi Ryouta, bose	
Girlfriend, Girlfriend (カノジョも彼女, Kanojo mo Kanojo)	#14, 2020	#25, 2023	Hiroyuki	Published in English by Kodansha USA.
Tokyo Babel (トーキョーバベル)	#22/23, 2020	#49, 2020	Karin Sora, Ran Kuze	
Shangri-La Frontier (シャングリラ・フロンティア, Shangurira Furontia)	#33, 2020	Present	Katarina, Ryōsuke Fuji	Published in English by Kodansha USA.
Majō ni Sasageru Trick (魔女に捧げるトリック)	#39, 2020	#19, 2021	Shizumu Watanabe	
Beast No. 6 (獣の六番, Kemono no Roku-ban)	#41, 2020	#13, 2021	Kohei Nagashii	Published in English by Kodansha USA.
Kangi Banka (カンギバンカ)	#50, 2020	#33, 2021	Imamura Shougo, Megumi Kouji	
Koi ka Mahō ka Wakaranai! (恋か魔法かわからない！)	#2/3, 2021	#35, 2021	Attsun	
Tesla Note (テスラノート)	#6, 2021	#32, 2021	Nishida Masafumi, Tadayoshi Kubo, Sannomiya Kouta	Transferred to Magazine Pocket.
Four Knights of the Apocalypse (黙示録の四騎士, Mokushiroku no Yon-kishi)	#9, 2021	Present	Nakaba Suzuki	Published in English by Kodansha USA.
Go! Go! Loser Ranger! (戦隊大失格, Sentai Daishikkaku)	#10, 2021	Present	Negi Haruba	
The Café Terrace and Its Goddesses (女神のカフェテラス, Megami no Kafe Terasu)	#12, 2021	#49, 2025	Kōji Seo	
Kenja ga Nakama ni Natta (賢者が仲間になった！)	#17, 2021	#8, 2022	AZU	
Tying the Knot with an Amagami Sister (甘神さんちの縁結び, Amagami-san Chi no Enmusubi)	#21, 2021	#39, 2025	Marcey Naito	
Eisen no Lovelock (英戦のラブロック)	#24, 2021	#7, 2022	Tatsuya Shihira	
Medaka Kuroiwa Is Impervious to My Charms (黒岩メダカに私の可愛いが通じない, Kuroiwa Medaka ni Watashi no Kawaii ga Tsūjinai)	#26, 2021	Present	Ran Kuze	
iContact (iコンタクト)	#39, 2021	#21, 2022	Hiroaki Igano, Kaya Tsukiyama	
Eru no wa! Renai Jakusha to Peke Tenshi (えるのわ!〜恋愛弱者とペケ天使〜)	#43, 2021	#24, 2022	Kou Suzumoto	
The Blue Wolves of Mibu (青のミブロ, Ao no Miburo)	#46, 2021	Present	Tsuyoshi Yasuda	Published in English by Kodansha USA.
Second Break!!	#1, 2022	#34, 2022	Tomohiro Inaki	
Gachiakuta (ガチアクタ)	#12, 2022	Present	Kei Urana	
Kimi ga Megami nara Ii no ni (きみが女神ならいいのに)	#21, 2022	#49, 2022	Kano Kashiwagi	
Even the Student Council Has Its Holes! (生徒会にも穴はある!, Seitokai ni mo Ana wa Aru!)	#22/23, 2022	Present	Muchimaro	
Mistress Kanan Is Devilishly Easy (カナン様はあくまでチョロい, Kanan-sama wa Akumade Choroi)	#27, 2022	Present	Nonco	
Muni no Ichigeki (無二の一撃)	#31, 2022	#6, 2023	Kōtarō Naitō	
Hinata-san, Hoshino desu (日向さん、星野です。)	#36/37, 2022	#34, 2023	Uoyama	
Honeko Akabane's Bodyguards (赤羽骨子のボディガード, Akabane Honeko no Bodigādo)	#43, 2022	#51, 2024	Masamitsu Nigatsu	
Atwight Game (アトワイトゲーム)	#44, 2022	#19, 2023	Naoshi Arakawa	
Miss Hikaru's Sparkling Proposal (きらぼしお嬢様の求婚, Kiraboshi Ojousama no Kyuukon)	#50, 2022	#36/37, 2023	Hideki	
Yowayowa Sensei (よわよわ先生)	#51, 2022	Present	Kamio Fukuchi	
Kitazawa-kun wa A-Class (北沢くんはAクラス)	#53, 2022	#29, 2023	Tsukasa Monma, Tanuki Yumeno	
Dead Account (デッドアカウント)	#7, 2023	#40, 2023	Shizumu Watanabe	Transferred to Magazine Pocket.
Usayama Joshi Kōkō 2-nen 1-kumi!! (兎山女子高校2年1組!!)	#20, 2023	#48, 2023	Yuki Shimizu	
Brave Bell	#28, 2023	#29, 2024	Meeb, Okane	
Kimura × Class	#30, 2023	#2/3, 2024	Tōru Sumiishi, Nau Doi	
Tune In to the Midnight Heart (真夜中ハートチューン, Mayonaka Heart Tune)	#42, 2023	Present	Masakuni Igarashi	
Mononoke no Ran (もののけの乱)	#45, 2023	#18, 2024	Yōsuke Takeda	
Katana Beast (獣心のカタナ, Jūshin no Katana)	#48, 2023	#41, 2024	Akimine Kamijyo	
Orion's Board (盤上のオリオン, Banjō no Orion)	#6, 2024	Present	Naoshi Arakawa	
Kaijin Fugeki (灰仭巫覡)	#26, 2024	Present	Oh! great	
Love Forty (ラブフォーティ)	#28, 2024	#14, 2025	Jirō Katori, Shinichi Itō	
Batchiri Scratch (ばっちりスクラッチ)	#31, 2024	#31, 2025	Punatsu	
Galaxias	#32, 2024	#7, 2025	Ao Hatesaka	Transferred to Magazine Pocket.
Irozuku Monochrome (色憑くモノクローム)	#38, 2024	#28, 2025	Atsushi Uchiyama	
Yumene Connect (ゆめねこねくと, Yumene Konekuto)	#40, 2024	Present	Kou Sawada	

=== 2025–present ===
Manga	First Issue	Final Issue	Manga artist	Notes
Ace of the Diamond Act II Side Story: Teito vs Ugumori (ダイヤのA actII 外伝 帝東VS鵜久森)	#4/5, 2025	#14, 2025	Yuji Terajima	
Suruga Meteor (スルガメテオ, Suruga Meteo)	#7, 2025	Present	Tanaka Drill	
The Werewolf Who Wants to Stay Alive (生きたがりの人狼(ワーウルフ), Ikitagari no Wāurufu)	#15, 2025	#2/3, 2026	Shigeki Tange	
The Kagari Monster Family (篝家の8兄弟, Kagari-ke no Hachi Kyōdai)	#17, 2025	#7, 2026	Sora Daichi	
Kurotsuki no Yaergnacht (黒月のイェルクナハト, Kurotsuki no Ierukunahato)	#19, 2025	Present	Kou Suzumoto	
Kito the Night Bell (夜鐘のキト, Yorukane no Kito)	#23, 2025	#6, 2026	Genri Natsume	
Jackpot Girls (ドリーム☆ジャンボ☆ガール, Dorīmu Janbo Gāru)	#26, 2025	Present	Hiroyuki	
Idolatry (アイドラトリィ, Aidoratorī)	#33, 2025	#16, 2026	Shin Otaka, Homare	Transferred to Magazine Pocket
Zero to Hyaku (ゼロとヒャク)	#50, 2025	Present	Shōichirō Edo	
Umine the Island Inn (あの島の海音荘, Anoshima no Kainesō)	#7, 2026	Present	Kōji Seo	
Ura-Tokyo: Exorcist City (裏東京のオソロシドコロ, Ura Tōkyō no Osoroshidokoro)	#16, 2026	Present	Kojiro	
Lilim Holic (りりむホリック, Ririmu Horikku)	#24, 2026	Present	Tsumugi Musawo	
Sen Sen Senki (千仙戦記)	#28, 2026	Present	A-10, Ryūga Kawasaki	
Killer + Sitter	#30, 2026	Present	Akimine Kamijyo	
Zureta Kaishaku no Bokura (ズレた解釈のぼくら)	#32, 2026	Present	Kano Kashiwagi	
Gunyū o Tsuzuru (群雄を綴る)	#34, 2026	Present	Otemoto	
Fairy Tail Re:Fantasia	#35, 2026	#44, 2026	Hiro Mashima	
Onryō Biyori (怨霊日和)	#41, 2026	Present	Haruka Imai	
Witch on the Holy Night (魔法使いの夜, Mahōtsukai no Yoru)	#50, 2026	Present	Keigo Maki	
