= Rose Hip =

Rose Hip, rosehip, or variation, may refer to:

- Rose hips, the fruit of the rose flower plant
- Rosehip neuron, a type of GABA neuron
- The Rosehips (album), an album by Kevin Junior
- Rose Hip (manga franchise), a Japanese comic book franchise created by Tooru Fujisawa
  - Rose Hip Rose, a manga created by Tooru Fujisawa
  - Rose Hip Zero, a manga created by Tooru Fujisawa

== See also ==
- Rosehip extract
- Rose hip soup
- Rose hip wine
- Rose (disambiguation)
