= Galaxias (disambiguation) =

Galaxias is a genus of galaxiid fishes.

Galaxias may also refer to:

- Galaxias (supermarkets), a supermarket chain in Greece
- The Greek language term of the word "galaxy"
- Galaxias (Japanese band)
- Galaxias (novel), a 2021 science fiction novel by Stephen Baxter
- Galaxias (manga), a Japanese manga series by Ao Hatesaka
