= 1-nen A-gumi no Monster =

Japanese manga series

- First tankōbon volume cover

1年A組のモンスター (1-Nen A-gumi no Monsutā)
- Manga
- Written by: Hideki
- Published by: Ichijinsha
- Imprint: Rex Comics
- Magazine: Monthly Comic Rex
- Original run: January 27, 2018 – March 27, 2026
- Volumes: 16

1-nen A-gumi no Monster (1年A組のモンスター, 1-Nen A-gumi no Monsutā; lit. 'The Monsters of Class 1-A') is a Japanese manga series written and illustrated by Hideki. It was serialized in Ichijinsha's Monthly Comic Rex magazine from January 2018 to March 2026.

== Plot ==
At Suezono Girls' High School, Class 1-A is infamous for driving away homeroom teachers through bullying, blackmail, and manipulation, earning the nickname the "Monster Class." A new teacher, Taro Jimi, is assigned to the class despite its reputation. Although he appears plain and unremarkable, Jimi takes a strict and methodical approach to teaching and discipline, refusing to be intimidated by the students.

The class is led by Momo Hananaka, a popular and manipulative student who attempts to force Jimi out like the previous teachers, including trying to frame him in a scandal. However, Jimi remains unfazed and begins systematically confronting the students' behavior and personal issues. Jimi's own mysterious and troubled past is gradually revealed, with his methods beginning to change the class.

== Characters ==
Tarō Jimi (自見太郎, Jimi Tarō)
Voiced by: Yoshitsugu Matsuoka (PV)
Momo Hananaka (花中桃, Hananaka Momo)
Voiced by: Hikaru Akao (PV)
Tsubaki Yabu (藪つばき, Yabu Tsubaki)
Voiced by: Azumi Waki (PV)
Mari Banri (万里茉莉, Banri Mari)
Voiced by: Chitose Morinaga (PV)
Aoi Tenjiku (天竺葵, Tenjiku Aoi)
Voiced by: Aya Yamane (PV)
Akira Akashi (明石晃, Akashi Akira)
Voiced by: Masamu Ono (PV)

== Media ==
=== Manga ===
Written and illustrated by Hideki, 1-nen A-gumi no Monster was serialized in Ichijinsha's Monthly Comic Rex magazine from January 27, 2018, to March 27, 2026. Its chapters were collected into sixteen tankōbon volumes released from June 27, 2018, to May 27, 2026.

No.	Release date	ISBN
1	June 27, 2018	978-4-7580-6741-6
2	January 26, 2019	978-4-7580-6783-6
3	July 27, 2019	978-4-7580-6817-8
4	January 27, 2020	978-4-7580-6843-7
5	August 5, 2020	978-4-7580-6884-0
6	February 3, 2021	978-4-7580-6903-8; 978-4-7580-6904-5 (SE)
7	August 4, 2021	978-4-7580-6939-7
8	February 3, 2022	978-4-7580-6958-8
9	July 27, 2022	978-4-7580-6990-8
10	January 26, 2023	978-4-7580-8403-1
11	July 27, 2023	978-4-7580-8439-0
12	February 27, 2024	978-4-7580-8468-0
13	August 27, 2024	978-4-7580-8566-3
14	February 27, 2025	978-4-7580-8653-0
15	September 27, 2025	978-4-7580-8802-2
16	May 27, 2026	978-4-7580-9904-2

=== Other ===
In commemoration of the release of the series' third volume on July 27, 2019, a promotional video was released on Ichijinsha's YouTube channel that same day.

== See also ==
- She's Adopted a High School Boy!, another manga series by the same author
