= Super Doctor K =

Japanese manga series

- First tankōbon volume cover, featuring Saijō Kazuya

スーパードクターK (Sūpā Dokutā K)
- Genre: Medical drama
- Manga
- Written by: Kazuo Mafune
- Published by: Kodansha
- Imprint: Shōnen Magazine Comics
- Magazine: Weekly Shōnen Magazine
- Original run: April 6, 1988 – October 21, 1998
- Volumes: 54
- Series titles
- 1. Super Doctor K (1988–1996; 44 volumes); 2. Doctor K (1996–1998; 10 volumes)
- Manga

K2
- Written by: Kazuo Mafune
- Published by: Kodansha
- Imprint: Evening KC
- Magazine: Evening (2004–2023); Comic Days (2023–present)
- Original run: May 11, 2004 – present
- Volumes: 53
- icon

Super Doctor K (Japanese: スーパードクターK, Hepburn: Sūpā Dokutā K) is a Japanese manga series written and illustrated by Kazuo Mafune. It was serialized in Kodansha's shōnen manga magazine Weekly Shōnen Magazine from April 1988 to October 1996, with its chapters collected in 44 tankōbon volumes. A second series, Doctor K, was serialized in the same magazine from October 1996 to October 1998, with its chapters collected in ten tankōbon volumes. A third series, K2, was serialized in Kodansha's seinen manga magazine Evening from May 2004 until February 2023, when the magazine ceased its publication, and moved to the Comic Days online platform in March of that same year. Its chapters have been collected in 53 tankōbon volumes as of August 2026.

By September 2021, the overall manga franchise had over 15 million copies in circulation.

== Plot ==
Saijō Kazuya, known as "K", is a genius physician who operates independently of any hospital, dedicating his skills to saving lives. As the heir to a long lineage of unorthodox medical practitioners, he combines ancestral healing techniques with cutting-edge medical knowledge, making him a peerless doctor. However, his extraordinary abilities attract dangerous attention. Powerful figures seeking to exploit his expertise and underground organ trafficking syndicates repeatedly clash with him. Despite these threats, K remains unwavering in his mission to cure patients afflicted with incurable diseases, battling both illness and corruption in his pursuit of justice.

=== K2 ===
In 2004, five years after the death of Dr. K, a young doctor named Kenta Tominaga arrives in T Village, a remote area supposedly without medical care. There, he encounters an extraordinarily skilled unlicensed physician—Kazuto Kamishiro, the hidden successor to Dr. K's legacy. Meanwhile, Kazunori Kuroso, a clone virtually identical to Dr. K, also begins his journey as a healer. As the new Dr. K and the future Dr. K, the two men carve their own medical legends, shaping a new era of extraordinary healing and ethical dilemmas.

== Publication ==
Written and illustrated by Kazuo Mafune, with medical supervision from Tohoru Nakahara, Super Doctor K was serialized in Kodansha's shōnen manga magazine Weekly Shōnen Magazine from April 6, 1988, to October 2, 1996. Kodansha collected its chapters in 44 tankōbon volumes, released from August 17, 1988, to December 13, 1996.

A sequel, titled Doctor K (rendered in Latin-script), was serialized in the same magazine from October 9, 1996, to October 21, 1998. Its chapters were collected in ten tankōbon volumes, released from April 17, 1997, to November 17, 1998.

Another manga series, titled K2, started in Kodansha's seinen manga magazine Evening on May 11, 2004. (Note: The series started in the 11th issue of 2004 (cover date May 25); the bi-weekly magazine was published two weeks before the cover date (e.g. the 10th issue of that year, with cover date May 11, was released on April 27).) Evening ceased publication on February 28, 2023, and the series moved to Kodansha's Comic Days online platform on March 26 of the same year. Kodansha released the first tankōbon volume on November 22, 2004; with the release of the 46th volume of K2 on December 21, 2023, the overall series reached 100 volumes. As of August 21, 2026, 53 volumes have been released.

== Reception ==
By September 2021, the overall manga franchise had over 15 million copies in circulation.
