= She's Adopted a High School Boy! =

Japanese manga series

- First tankōbon volume cover

男子高校生を養いたいお姉さんの話 (Danshi Kōkōsei o Yashinaitai Onē-san no Hanashi)
- Genre: Romantic comedy; Slice of life
- Manga
- Written by: Hideki
- Published by: Kodansha
- English publisher: NA: Kodansha (BookWalker Exclusive) (digital)
- Imprint: Shōnen Magazine Comics
- Magazine: Weekly Shōnen Magazine
- Original run: April 11, 2018 – March 30, 2022
- Volumes: 13
- icon

She's Adopted a High School Boy! (Note: Japanese: 男子高校生を養いたいお姉さんの話, Hepburn: Danshi Kōkōsei o Yashinaitai Onē-san no Hanashi; "The Story of a Lady Who Wants to Keep a High School Boy") is a Japanese manga series written and illustrated by Hideki. It was serialized in Kodansha's Weekly Shōnen Magazine from April 2018 to March 2022, with its chapters collected in 13 tankōbon volumes.

== Synopsis ==
One day, the parents of Minoru Soramoto disappear, leaving their son with huge debt. Left alone in the apartment building, Minoru nearly has his organs sold, but his neighbor, Shiori Kanemochi, saves him. She also pays off his debt and lets him live in her house. However, she reveals none of her personal information, making Minoru feel withdrawn from her, but he is grateful nonetheless and begins a strange life living with her.

== Publication ==
She's Adopted a High School Boy!, written and illustrated by Hideki, was serialized in Kodansha's Weekly Shōnen Magazine from April 11, 2018, to March 30, 2022. Kodansha collected its chapters in 13 tankōbon volumes, published from August 17, 2018, to May 17, 2022. A promotional video for the seventh volume, featuring Kensho Ono as protagonist Minoru Soramoto, was launched on July 17, 2020.

In July 2021, it was announced that BookWalker Global partnered with Kodansha USA to publish the manga digitally in English, starting on August 3 of the same year.

=== Volumes ===
No.	Original release date	Original ISBN	English release date	English ISBN
1	August 17, 2018	978-4-06-512197-9	August 3, 2021	—
2	November 16, 2018	978-4-06-513397-2	August 3, 2021	—
3	March 15, 2019	978-4-06-514441-1	August 3, 2021	—
4	July 17, 2019	978-4-06-515689-6	August 31, 2021	—
5	November 15, 2019	978-4-06-517352-7	October 5, 2021	—
6	March 17, 2020	978-4-06-518520-9	October 26, 2021	—
7	July 17, 2020	978-4-06-520107-7	November 23, 2021	—
8	November 17, 2020	978-4-06-521252-3	December 28, 2021	—
9	March 17, 2021	978-4-06-522217-1	January 25, 2022	—
10	July 15, 2021	978-4-06-524031-1	February 22, 2022	—
11	October 15, 2021	978-4-06-525139-3	March 22, 2022	—
12	February 17, 2022	978-4-06-526891-9	August 30, 2022	—
13	May 17, 2022	978-4-06-527910-6	December 27, 2022	—

== Reception ==
The manga ranked second in Pixiv Comic Ranking 2018 in the slice of life category.

== See also ==
- 1-nen A-gumi no Monster, another manga series by the same author
