= Real Account =

Japanese manga series

- Cover of the first manga volume

リアルアカウント (Riaru Akaunto)
- Genre: Action; Science fiction; Suspense
- Manga
- Written by: Okushō
- Illustrated by: Shizumu Watanabe
- Published by: Kodansha
- English publisher: NA: Kodansha USA
- Imprint: Shōnen Magazine Comics
- Magazine: Bessatsu Shōnen Magazine; (2014, 2018–2019); Weekly Shōnen Magazine; (2014–2018)
- Original run: January 9, 2014 – November 9, 2019
- Volumes: 24

Real Account (Japanese: リアルアカウント, Hepburn: Riaru Akaunto) is a Japanese manga series written by Okushō and illustrated by Shizumu Watanabe. The story follows the siblings Ataru and Yuri Kashiwagi who live together alone and in poverty since their parents died. Ataru often uses a social media platform called Real Account where he is able to find new friends online. However, a real-life social media game takes a twisted turn when Ataru, along with 10.000 other users, gets trapped in virtual reality and is forced to play deadly games against each other.

The series started publication in Kodansha's Bessatsu Shōnen Magazine in January 2014, but moved to Weekly Shōnen Magazine in December of the same year and ended in November 2019. In total, 24 volumes have been released.

== Plot ==
After their parents died, a second-year high school student, Ataru Kashiwagi, and his younger sister, Yuri, lived alone together and in poverty. At school, Ataru seeks refuge by finding new friends online through Real Account, a social media platform that enables its users to link their accounts to gain followers in real time. One day, however, the borderline between online and reality suddenly began to merge when Ataru, along with 10.000 other users of that app, found themselves trapped in a virtual reality version of the app where they were unable to leave the virtual world, with their real-world bodies being immobilized.

Marble, the app's mascot, forces the trapped users to participate in the virtual game show against each other with their lives at stake. Not only that, but each user has followers whose lives are endangered as well. Once a user dies, all of his or her followers lose their lives as well. When a user loses all followers, they will die as well. The rules of this social media game get twisted out of control due to many users dying because of losing followers, while the rest of the world can watch this life-or-death game with the risk of becoming a follower as well.

In a fit of panic, Ataru attempts to block Yuri in order to save her life, only to be interfered with by an unexpected encounter with Yuuma Mukai, an unknown user who looks exactly like him. In order to complete these games, Ataru teams up with Yuuma, along with other users, to participate in the deadly games and fight for survival in the hope of finding the mastermind behind this game and returning to the real world alive someday.

The series ends with the destruction of the "Real Account" website and the death of its creators, Masahide and Shin, thus concluding the deadly game they orchestrated. While the site is gone, the dark side of the internet persists, as evidenced by a news report showing the suicide of two bullied teenagers. Afterward, Ataru chooses to isolate himself from his friends but still keeps in touch, while Yuuma decides to take a break from the internet but acknowledges its potential for good.

== Media ==
=== Manga ===
Okushō started writing the series on January 9, 2014, with illustrations done by Shizumu Watanabe. The first chapters were published in Kodansha's manga magazine Bessatsu Shōnen Magazine in 2014, moved to Weekly Shōnen Magazine in December of the same year but moved back to Bessatsu Shōnen Magazine in June 2018. The first printed volume was published on May 9, 2014. In May 2019, it was announced that the manga has entered the final arc of the story. In September the same year, it was revealed that the series would end in 3 chapters. The last chapters were published in the December 2019 issue of Bessatsu Shōnen Magazine released on November 9, 2019, with last compiled book being published a month later.

The manga series received localizations in English, German, Italian, French, and Chinese.

=== Novel ===
A novel based on the manga and written by Ren Kanan was published under the title Real Account 0 on June 7, 2019.

=== Cancelled live-action film ===
In January 2018, it was announced that Real Account would be adapted into a live-action film. However, the adaptation was cancelled in March 2025 due to various circumstances.

== Reception ==
=== Commercially ===
According to an article written by Maximilian Gottselig for the German-language manga news website in October 2020, Real Account has sold about 3.3 million copies in Japan alone while in Germany however the demand was low which may have been caused by the COVID-19 pandemic.

=== Reviews ===
Rebecca Silverman reviewed the first volume of Real Account on Anime News Network saying that it shares more similarities to Btooom! than to Sword Art Online as the series takes the genre to very different angle.

== See also ==
- Dead Account, another manga series illustrated by Shizumu Watanabe
