= Mio Murao =

Japanese manga artist

- 村生ミオ
- Born: Mikio Murai; 28 April 1952; Tokushima, Japan
- Died: 16 April 2022 (aged 69); Tokyo, Japan
- Occupation: Mangaka

Mikio Murai (Japanese: 村井 幹生, 28 April 1952 – 16 April 2022), professionally known as Mio Murao (Japanese: 村生ミオ) was a Japanese manga artist and writer, active for about 50 years.

== Life and career ==
Born in Tokushima, Murao started his career as an assistant of Kimio Yanagisawa, and made his official debut as a mangaka in 1972 with Kappa Love Love Daisakusen (別冊少年ジャンプ), which was published in Bessatsu Shōnen Jump. In 1974, he was awarded the Tezuka Award for Twin Banzai.

Murao had his breakout in the early 1980s, with the rabu-kome (romantic comedy) series Munasawagi no Houkago, Kekkon Game and Binetsu My Love, which were serialized in Weekly Shōnen Magazine and GORO and had multiple film and television adaptations. From the 1990s, he focused on the seinen genre and on more adult themed manga.

After a long illness beginning in 2019, Murao died on 16 April 2022, at the age of 69. His last work was the manga Yami ni Daka reru Onna (闇に抱かれる女, "A Woman in the Dark").
