= Kurotsuki no Yaergnacht =

Japanese manga series

- First tankōbon volume cover

黒月のイェルクナハト (Kurotsuki no Ierukunahato)
- Genre: Fantasy; Romantic comedy
- Manga
- Written by: Kō Suzumoto
- Published by: Kodansha
- Imprint: Shōnen Magazine Comics
- Magazine: Weekly Shōnen Magazine
- Original run: April 9, 2025 – present
- Volumes: 6

Kurotsuki no Yaergnacht (Japanese: 黒月のイェルクナハト, Hepburn: Kurotsuki no Ierukunahato; lit. 'Yaergnacht of the Dark Moon') is a Japanese manga series written and illustrated by Kō Suzumoto. It began serialization in Kodansha's Weekly Shōnen Magazine in April 2025, and has been compiled into six volumes as of September 2026.

== Plot ==
The series follows Shinogi Inumata, an 18-year-old orphan with the ability to see ghosts. One night, while on the way home from a job interview, he encounters a beautiful spirit woman. Seeing her as a threat, he kills her, only to find her regenerated in his apartment. Introducing herself as Yaergnacht Finsternis, she asks him to become her husband and to fight against the Apostles, enemies of humanity who kill people thought to have strayed from God's creation.

== Characters ==
Shinogi Inumata (戌亦 しのぎ, Inumata Shinogi)
An 18-year-old unemployed man who lives alone and is looking for a job. His parents, who were the heads of the Inumata Corporate Group, died prior to the events of the story. He was the star of his high school basketball team, but dropped out of high school. He has the ability to see spirits and has the power to kill them.
Yaergnacht Finsternis (イェルクナハト・フィンステルニス, Yerukunahato Finsuterunisu)
Voiced by: Yui Ishikawa (PV)
A mysterious spirit woman who attacked Shinogi one night. She has the power to regenerate herself after being killed, although this takes up much of her power. She was formerly one of the Apostles and asks Shinogi to help her defeat them, while also asking him to be her husband. She has the ability to create things based on her desire for them to exist, including creating an entire apartment building.

== Publication ==
The series is written and illustrated by Kō Suzumoto. It began serialization in Kodansha's Weekly Shōnen Magazine on April 9, 2025. The first tankōbon volume was released on July 16, 2025; six volumes have been released as of November 17, 2026.

No.	Release date	ISBN
1	July 16, 2025	978-4-06-540075-3
2	October 17, 2025	978-4-06-541107-0
3	February 17, 2026	978-4-06-542633-3
4	May 15, 2026	978-4-06-543624-0
5	August 15, 2026	978-4-06-544616-4
6	November 17, 2026	978-4-06-545722-1

== Reception ==
Following the release of the first volume, a Weekly Shōnen Magazine representative claimed that the series had the fastest reprint decision for a first volume within the past ten years. The series' promotional video was watched over 800,000 times on Twitter.

The series was ranked fifteenth in the Nationwide Bookstore Employees' Recommended Comics list of 2026. The series was ranked eleventh in the print category at the twelfth Next Manga Award in 2026.
