= Idolatry (manga) =

Japanese manga series

- First tankōbon volume cover

アイドラトリィ (Aidoratorī)
- Manga
- Written by: Shin Ōtaka
- Illustrated by: Homare
- Published by: Kodansha
- Imprint: Shōnen Magazine Comics
- Magazine: Weekly Shōnen Magazine (July 16, 2025 – March 18, 2026); Magazine Pocket (March 25, 2026 – present)
- Original run: July 16, 2025 – present
- Volumes: 6

Idolatry (Japanese: アイドラトリィ, Hepburn: Aidoratorī) is a Japanese manga series written by Shin Ōtaka and illustrated by Homare. It began serialization in Kodansha's Weekly Shōnen Magazine in July 2025, before transferring to their Magazine Pocket service in March 2026. The series has been compiled into six volumes as of November 2026.

== Plot ==
Junna Harumi, a 17-year-old high school student, is a big fan of the idol group Tokyo Crush, particularly its member Fuwari Tsukishiro. Despite both Tokyo Crush and Fuwari's lack of popularity, Junna feels attached to both, even going as far as to defend them on social media. One night, she is devastated to learn that Tokyo Crush is disbanding. Unable to come to terms with the sudden announcement, she sees Fuwari's response and deduces that Fuwari is about to enter an audition to relaunch her career. Junna finds out about Project Raw Stone, an upcoming competition for idols, leading her to track down the project's producer, Ayako Shinjou. Tracking her down, Junna performs for her, saying she wants to join Project Raw Stone. Despite her lack of singing and dancing talent, Ayako sees Junna's potential and decides to add her to Project Raw Stone's line-up, with Junna taking the opportunity to support Fuwari.

== Characters ==
Junna Harumi (陽見 循菜, Harumi Junna)
Voiced by: Rie Takahashi (PV)
A 17-year-old high school student and a fan of the idol group Tokyo Crush. She is a major fan, to the point she has worked part-time jobs to afford their merchandise and CDs, while also defending the group from online critics. She admires Fuwari Tsukishiro and joined Project Raw Stone to support her and help Fuwari become among the project's five chosen debutants. Due to her strong fandom for Tokyo Crush, she has gone as far as stalking and blackmailing to further the group's interests.
Fuwari Tsukishiro (槻城 ふわり, Tsukishiro Fuwari)
Voiced by: Yurie Igoma (PV)
A member of the idol group Tokyo Crush, which despite being signed to a major talent agency has failed to find success. Among its members, she is not particularly popular either. Despite the group's lack of success, Fuwari is talented and enjoys being an idol. After Tokyo Crush's disbandment, she joins Project Raw Stone, aiming to re-enter the industry.
Ayako Shinjou (新条 絢子, Shinjō Ayako)
A 32-year-old former idol, who is the producer of Project Raw Stone talent competition. When Junna discovered Project Raw Stone, she tracked Ayako down, asking her if Fuwari was joining and if she could also join. After hearing Junna sing, Ayako decides to enter her in the competition, seeing her potential despite her poor dancing and singing skills. She likes pudding.
Risa Hatsumiya (初宮 リサ, Hatsumiya Risa)
A Project Raw Stone contestant, belonging to Class A. She previously was part of a Russian circuit troupe. She has an arrogant personality that leads her to look down at the other contestants.
Miyako Asaoka (麻丘 都, Asaoka Miyako)
A Project Raw Stone contestant, belonging to class A. She was previously a member of the South Korean girl group Rosy glass, which disbanded the year prior.
Hayate Shingu (新宮 はやて, Shingū Hayate)
A Project Raw Stone contestant, belonging to class A.
Abi Matsuda (松田 アビ, Matsuda Abi)
A Project Raw Stone contestant, belonging to class A.
Yuzuha Murakoshi (村越 ゆづは, Murakoshi Yuzuha)
A Project Raw Stone contestant, belonging to class A.
Suu Nonoo (野々緒 好憂, Nonoo Sū)
A Project Raw Stone contestant, belonging to class A.
Shou Matoiba (的射場 笙, Matoiba Shō)
A Project Raw Stone contestant, who serves as the leader of class D. She speaks in old-fashioned Japanese.
Asaka Fujii (藤井 朝夏, Fujii Asaka)
A Project Raw Stone contestant, belonging to class D.
Kuromi Tendou (転堂 玄実, Tendō Kuromi)
A Project Raw Stone contestant, belonging to class D.
Takane Ninomiya (二宮 種花, Ninomiya Takane)
A Project Raw Stone contestant, belonging to class D.
Raito Sakayori (酒寄 雷斗, Sakayori Raito)
An assistant director at Taka TV.
Hiroshi Kitanoe (北家 弘史, Kitanoe Hiroshi)
The president of Taka TV and the co-producer of Project Raw Stone. He was initially against Junna's inclusion in the competition, but ultimately accepted.
Tatsumi Amou (天羽 辰巳, Amou Tatsumi)
The 90-year-old chairman of Taka TV, and a feared figured in the television industry.
Riko (リコ)
A former member of Tokyo Crush, and the only one who gained meaningful popularity. Junna does not think highly of her and suspects that her scandals were the reason behind the group's disbandment.

== Publication ==
Written by Shin Ōtaka and illustrated by Homare, the series began serialization in Kodansha's Weekly Shōnen Magazine on July 16, 2025. The first tankōbon volume was released on October 17, 2025; a promotional video featuring the voices of Rie Takahashi and Yurie Igoma, who previously co-starred in the anime series Oshi no Ko, was posted on Weekly Shōnen Magazine's official YouTube channel to coincide with the volume's release. The series was transferred to Kodansha's Magazine Pocket service on March 25, 2026. Six volumes have been released as of November 17, 2026.

No.	Release date	ISBN
1	October 17, 2025	978-4-06-540916-9
2	December 17, 2025	978-4-06-541989-2
3	March 17, 2026	978-4-06-543002-6
4	June 17, 2026	978-4-06-543626-4
5	September 16, 2026	978-4-06-544983-7
6	November 17, 2026	978-4-06-545724-5

== Reception ==
The series was ranked seventh in the web category at the 2026 Next Manga Awards.
