= Dead Account =

Japanese manga series

- First tankōbon volume cover, featuring Soji Enishiro

デッドアカウント (Deddo Akaunto)
- Genre: Action; Supernatural
- Manga
- Written by: Shizumu Watanabe
- Published by: Kodansha
- English publisher: Kodansha (digital)
- Imprint: Shōnen Magazine Comics
- Magazine: Weekly Shōnen Magazine; (January 18 – September 6, 2023); Magazine Pocket; (October 7, 2023 – present)
- Original run: January 18, 2023 – present
- Volumes: 16
- Anime television series
- Directed by: Keiya Saitō
- Written by: Mitsutaka Hirota
- Music by: Keiji Inai
- Studio: SynergySP
- Licensed by: Crunchyroll: SEA: Medialink
- Original network: ANN (TV Asahi)
- Original run: January 10, 2026 – March 28, 2026
- Episodes: 12
- icon

Dead Account (Japanese: デッドアカウント, Hepburn: Deddo Akaunto) is a Japanese manga series written and illustrated by Shizumu Watanabe. It initially began serialization in Kodansha's shōnen manga magazine Weekly Shōnen Magazine in January 2023. It was later transferred to the Magazine Pocket website in October that same year. An anime television series adaptation produced by SynergySP aired from January to March 2026.

== Premise ==
After his little sister is killed by an evil spirit and turned into a digital evil spirit, Soji Enishiro finds himself thrust into the modern world of exorcists, where ghosts possess the accounts of the deceased, and exorcist powers are digitized.

== Characters ==
Soji Enishiro (縁城 蒼吏, Enishiro Sōji)
Voiced by: Nobuhiko Okamoto (Japanese); Parker Gray (English)
The main protagonist. He originally uploaded controversial videos online in order to pay for his sister's hospital bills, only for her to be killed by the spirit, Sad Boy K. He now works as an exorcist to destroy Sad Boy K, and avenge his sister. Contrary to his online persona, he is actually a very kind and selfless. His cyber-kinesis takes the form of blue flames that harm ghosts, but not humans.
Kukuru Kasubata (霞流 括, Kasubata Kukuru)
Voiced by: Koki Uchiyama (Japanese); Brandon Solis (English)
A short-tempered exorcist who resents flame-baiters. Originally born from a family of well-known exorcists, but he ran away due to their restrictive lifestyle, where he turned into a delinquent. He eventually returned when his mother died, but his father blamed him for her death. His cyber-kinesis ability takes the form of a giant hammer.
Kiyomi Urusugawa (漆栖川 希詠, Urusugawa Kiyomi)
Voiced by: Fairouz Ai (Japanese); Hayden Daviau (English)
An exorcist who resents exorcists with offensive-type abilities. Her cyber-kinesis ability takes the form of a special gun that shoots a restraining slime.
Renri Hasumi (羽住 蓮理, Hasumi Renri)
Voiced by: Natsuki Hanae (Japanese); Landon McDonald (English)
Hiyori Haijima (灰島 ひより, Haijima Hiyori)
Voiced by: Machico (Japanese); Jad Saxton (English)
Naruhiko Emoto (柄本 成彦, Emoto Maruhiko)
Voiced by: Ryōta Suzuki (Japanese); Davon Oliver (English)
A cowardly but kind-hearted boy. He was born into an abusive household where his parents constantly argued. He was taken away by the Exorcist Academy after his cyber-kinesis, which allows him to summon barriers when he listens to music, awakens.
Yoimaru Azaki (痣木 宵丸, Azaki Yoimaru)
Voiced by: Takuya Satō (Japanese); Ryan Negrón (English)
Dei Surugi (鋭義 泥, Surugi Dei)
Voiced by: Fumiya Imai (Japanese); Justin Briner (English)
Minoru Wagari (輪狩 実, Wagari Minoru)
Voiced by: Gen Satō (Japanese); Aaron Dismuke (English)
Eru Kusaba (草場 恵流, Kusaba Eru)
Voiced by: Maaya Uchida (Japanese); Lily Gast (English)
Ikko Owada (大和田 一狐, Owada Ikko)
Voiced by: Kentarō Kumagai (Japanese); Brian Vigen (English)
Kiri Namekawa (滑川 霧, Namekawa Kiri)
Voiced by: Masaya Miyazaki (Japanese); Ciarán Strange (English)
Ban Ashina (亜科 伴, Ashina Ban)
Voiced by: Jun Fukuyama (Japanese); Ethan Marshall (English)

== Media ==
=== Manga ===
Written and illustrated by Shizumu Watanabe, Dead Account was initially serialized in Kodansha's shōnen manga magazine Weekly Shōnen Magazine from January 18 to September 6, 2023. It was later transferred to the Magazine Pocket website on October 7, 2023. Its chapters have been collected into sixteen tankōbon volumes as of September 2026.

The series' chapters are published in English on Kodansha's "K Manga" app.

No.	Release date	ISBN
1	April 17, 2023	978-4-06-531266-7
2	June 15, 2023	978-4-06-531886-7
3	August 17, 2023	978-4-06-532617-6
4	October 17, 2023	978-4-06-533159-0
5	January 17, 2024	978-4-06-534181-0
6	April 17, 2024	978-4-06-535190-1
7	July 17, 2024	978-4-06-536122-1
8	October 17, 2024	978-4-06-537131-2
9	January 17, 2025	978-4-06-537772-7
10	March 17, 2025	978-4-06-538716-0
11	June 17, 2025	978-4-06-539767-1
12	October 17, 2025	978-4-06-541115-5
13	January 16, 2026	978-4-06-542215-1
14	March 17, 2026	978-4-06-543003-3
15	June 17, 2026	978-4-06-544305-7
16	September 16, 2026	978-4-06-544987-5
17	December 16, 2026	978-4-06-546205-8

=== Anime ===
An anime television series adaptation was announced on March 13, 2025. It is produced by SynergySP and directed by Keiya Saitō, with series composition handled by Mitsutaka Hirota, and music composed by Keiji Inai. The series aired from January 10 to March 28, 2026, on the IMAnimation programming block on TV Asahi and its affiliates. The opening theme song is "Dead End" (デッドエンド), performed by Haru Igarashi, while the ending theme song is "Raise wa Dōse" (来世はどうせ; 'In the Next Life Anyway'), performed by Miyu Kaneko. Crunchyroll is streaming the series. Medialink licensed the series in Southeast Asia for streaming on Ani-One Asia's YouTube channel.

==== Episodes ====
No.	Title	Directed by (Note: Production staff information is taken from the ending credits of each episode.)	Written by	Storyboarded by	Original release date
1	"He's a Flamebaiter"; Transliteration: "Sono Otoko, Enjō-kei" (Japanese: その男、炎上系)	Keiya Saitō	Mitsutaka Hirota	Keiya Saitō	January 10, 2026
To fund surgery for his sister Akari teenager Soji makes money by posting videos of himself punching famous fighters. After Akari has the surgery Soji deletes his account but is attacked by a man named Kasubata trying to destroy his phone. Kasubata reveals Soji is having a psychotic episode as Akari died a month previously. This shocks Soji out of the episode as he remembers after Akari's death she somehow texted him, and he has been mindlessly messaging her ever since. Soji's phone manifests a monstrous hologram of Akari. Kasubata reveals in the past ghosts only haunted physical locations, but now the online accounts of dead people have begun lingering as sinister "Ghost Accounts", and it is one of these Soji has been texting. Now she has manifested Kasubata uses Cyber-kinesis to summon a war hammer from his phone. Soji realises Akari is really dead and needs to move on and manages to manifest his own Cyber-kinesis. After an emotional goodbye he summons flames from his phone that consume Akari and delete her ghost account from cyberspace. Kasubata's team arrives and he reveals while flames are a common Cyber-kinesis, Soji's were blue. The team decide to take Soji with them to Miden Academy.
2	"Miden Academy"; Transliteration: "Wataru-den Gakuen" (Japanese: 弥電学園)	Moe Sasaki	Mitsutaka Hirota	Keiya Saitō	January 17, 2026
Soji awakens at Miden Academy for Exorcists where most students already don't like him for the videos he posts for attention, what they call "Flame-baiting". Kasubata introduces him to Instructor Azaki who explains in the past exorcists used Psychokinesis to exorcise ghosts, until ghosts became able to haunt social media accounts. To keep up exorcists were forced to abandon Psychokinesis and develop Cyberkinesis. Soji asks to go home, since he promised Akari he would get a job, eat healthily and get enough sleep like a functional adult. He is furious when Azaki reveals Akari didn't die from her illness, she was murdered by a powerful Ghost Account. Soji demands details but Azaki claims he is too weak to be of use, but promises to tell him if he beats Kasubata in a Cyberkinesis duel. Hating Flamebaiters, Kasubata enthusiastically beats him up while taunting him over Akari's death. Soji activates his blue flame, feared among exorcists as the "Demon Flame". Despite the boost in his physical abilities Kasubata almost kills him, forcing Azaki to stop the duel. Soji admits he isn't ready and asks to join Miden Academy. Half the students are fascinated but half refuse to accept a Flamebaiter with a Demon Flame.
3	"Cyberkinesis Output Test"; Transliteration: "Den nō Shutsuryoku Tesuto" (Japanese: 電能出力テスト)	Yūsuke Nakagama	Mitsutaka Hirota	Keiya Saitō	January 24, 2026
Soji is shown footage of dead account Sad Boy K, whose deceased human identity is a mystery and is the account that killed Akari with a Demon Flame. Soji is introduced to his classmates; Urusugawa, Hasumi, Haijima and Emoto. Azaki tests Soji by asking him to defeat 100 pseudo-accounts. Unfortunately, Soji passes out as his power output is so high his phone battery dies, signalling he ran out of spirit energy. Azaki gives him one week to improve or face consequences. Despite hating Flamebaiters, Kasubata agrees to train him and everyone is surprised by his unexpected improvements. During the test Soiji comes close to failure, so Kasubata leads the exorcists in shouting abuse at him. Soji remembers enduring hateful comments on his flamebaiting videos, but he did it for Akari. His flames suddenly shrink, costing him less energy and he defeats all 100 pseudo-accounts. Azaki is impressed, having realised Kasubata abused Soji to reawaken his flamebaiting personality, where abuse makes him stronger. The furious examiner sends even more pseudo-accounts to kill Soji, but Soji defeats 161 before the account generator breaks down. Soji learns as Miden is also a real academy he will have to attend high school classes again. A dead account appears in the city so Azaki sends Soji along with some classmates to teach him teamwork.
4	"The Worst Trio Possible"; Transliteration: "Saiaku no Sannin" (Japanese: 最悪の三人)	Moe Sasaki	Yuya Nakazono	Keiya Saitō	January 31, 2026
Sad Boy K is angered Akari's dead account was exorcised. Azaki's secretary Itabashi informs Soji he will be investigating an electronics store with Kasubata and Urusugawa to clear out multiple weak accounts using the electronics to recharge themselves. Urusugawa's cyber-kinesis manifests as a pistol that shoots a restraining slime. Kasubata explains Urusugawa is an unhinged stalker obsessed with a boyband guitarist named Yami. Urusugawa resents having to work as an exorcist as it takes time away from Yami. Soji starts to understand it is difficult for others to trust him as his flames kill both accounts and living people. They encounter the cursed dead account Kirika-chan that heals all injuries from their weapons. Urusugawa is injured and Soji manages to rescue her. Curious, Kasubata actually touches his flames and confirms that because Soji is a human the power of his demon flame is inverted, so while Sad Boy K's flames hurt humans Soji's only hurts accounts. Urusugawa awakens in response to missing Yami's livestream and restrains Kirika-chan while Soji covers her in flame, negating her regeneration so Kasubata can exorcise her. Soji admits as well as helping his sister he was also a flamebaiter because he loved the thrill. The others admit they have scum personalities too so they might have potential as a three-person team. Sad Boy K suddenly manifests in response to Kirika-chan's death, knocking out Kasubata and Urusugawa in an instant.
5	"The Anachronistic Exorcist"; Transliteration: "Jidaiokure no Reibai-shi" (Japanese: 時代遅れの霊媒師)	Yūsuke Nakagawa	Mitsutaka Hirota	Keiya Saitō	February 7, 2026
Sad Boy K accuses Soji of being Akari's real murderer, since as a dead account he made it possible for her to live forever. He decides to turn Soji into a dead account but is stopped by Azaki. Kasubata reveals Azaki does not use cyberkinesis as he is from the analogue generation. Instead, he still uses psychokinesis channelled through modern devices. With his summoned spirit Gallant Carp, Azaki extinguishes Sad Boy K's flames, who is unwillingly rescued by his subordinate Garran who pulls him into the internet. They discuss their plans to make it possible for dead accounts to exist outside cyberspace permanently. Azaki reveals Sad Boy K was actually running out of battery, so he wasn't anywhere close to his full power. MIden's Principal Yabami is confused why Sad Boy K would want to turn Soji into a dead account. Instructor Nanzo believes they should do a full purge exorcism on Soji, killing his body and ensuring his soul can't become an account. Azaki refuses as Soji is of more use as an exorcist. Soji, Kasubata and Urusugawa visit Nurse Kochi for their injuries. Kochi's ability lets her heal real injuries by editing photos of the injury. As their batteries are all drained they can't train their cyberkinesis for hours, so they go to the gym to strengthen their bodies instead, impressing everyone.
6	"Encounter in the Back Woods"; Transliteration: "Urayama no Deai" (Japanese: 裏山の出会い)	Tomio Yamauchi	Yuya Nakazono	Yoshiaki Okumura	February 14, 2026
Soji asks Kasubata for martial arts training but is ignored as Kasubata is busy leaving hate comments for other flame-baiters. For martial arts Kasubata sends Soji to Haijima, an introverted e-sports champion who only communicates via a denmi-doll controlled with cyberkinesis without leaving her room. Via her Denmi battle bot, Haijima is an expert martial artist and is impressed Soji blocks some of her attacks. Soji later meets Haijima in person by accident and finds she suffers extreme social anxiety, the complete opposite of her outgoing Denmi personality. Azaki reveals a plan to exorcise Sad Boy K in two months, but Soji and other first years won't be allowed to participate. Soji protests, so Azaki reveals there is a contest once per term between A and B class, and if Soji performs well he might be deemed skilled enough to participate with the exorcism. Class B start training right away, impressing the teachers. Surugi from Class A, another flame-baiter, deliberately destroys Akari's hairpin Soji carries with him everywhere. Haijima prevents Soji retaliating as Surugi loves picking on people until they retaliate as it is his fetish, and he has the support of Class A, most of whom are just as twisted as he is.
7	"The A-B Battle"; Transliteration: "Kōotsu Taikō-sen" (Japanese: 甲乙対抗戦)	Yūsuke Nakagawa	Mitsutaka Hirota	Keiya Saitō	February 21, 2026
Soji discovers Surugi somehow summons real flames without his phone. Surugi is shocked, and aroused, when Soji grabs his flaming hands without pain. Wagari, A class's sword user, insists their fight wait until the contest, where he is certain B class will lose. Kasubata confidently insists they will win because of Soji. Soji asks Azaki for training in a specific ability. Someone at Miden is shown in contact with Sad Boy K. Emoto remains nervous as A class are mostly offensive ability users, while his defensive barriers are easily destroyed. The competition is revealed to be urban warfare in a fake city with the goal of rendering opponents unable to fight. Nanzo demands A class utterly humiliate B class to demonstrate Soji's unfitness as an exorcist. Wagari is lured into a trap by Haijima where all of B class attack him as a group while Soji kicks him in the face. This enrages Wagari who uses the full, lethal power of his sword to destroy Haijima's doll and the surrounding buildings. For kicking him in the face Wagari decides to cut off everyone's hands and feet, which according to the rules wouldn't be fatal as Nurse Kochi can reattach them, and would be a victory for A class.
8	"Open the Window, and..." Transliteration: "Mado o Aketara" (Japanese: 窓を開けたら)	Takaaki Suzuki	Yuya Nakazono	Keiya Saitō	February 28, 2026
Emoto loses focus from fear, so his barrier disappears, for which Wagari mocks his cowardice. Everyone suddenly vanishes, teleported to separate locations through Hasumi's photographs, his cyberkinesis power. Unfortunately, Wagari forces his way through a photograph and confronts Kasubata, whom he hates for faking righteousness when he has history as a delinquent. Surugi finds Soji but is frustrated Soji figured out his weakness; since he lives to provoke others, Soji refuses to react to anything he says. Hasumi encounters Owada, who summons online pets as cyberbeasts. Hasumi recalls his family viciously trained him and his brother Rota to unlock psychokinesis, considering cyberkinesis to be heresy. When they failed, they were punished and Rota died during a starvation punishment. When his family acted as if Rota never existed, Hasumi escaped with help from Kasubata and became delinquents. When Hasumi started to forget Rota's face Kasubata gave him a phone to take pictures of important things, leading to the discovery of his cyberkinesis ability. Desperate to help Kasubata, Hasumi traps his cyberbeast in a photograph then summons a steel pipe from another photograph and hits Owada on the head, knocking him clean out and infuriating Instructor Nanzo.
9	"The Battle at Sainokawara"; Transliteration: "Sainokawara no Tatakai" (Japanese: 西の河原の戦い)	Tomio Yamauchi	Mitsutaka Hirota	Keiya Saitō	March 7, 2026
Urusugawa is found by Kasuba, another stalker who, once she has seduced someone into loving her, can copy their abilities. With martial-arts she prevents Urusugawa helping Kasubata and distracts her with a fake photo of herself seducing Yami, but Urusugawa recovers as it is clearly fake. Both their phones die so they resort to normal punching until, exhausted, they quit the contest and share a hot spring, having found mutual respect. The teachers detect a dead account in the contest area. Surugi is angry his flames won't burn Soji. While training to use cyberkinesis without his phone Soji discovered a way of generating flame from anywhere as long as his phone is in contact with his body, so anywhere Surugi's flame touches him won't be damaged if it is already on fire. Surugi wishes for Soji to beat him up with hatred but is horrified when Soji knocks him out with complete disinterest. Hasumi arrives to help Kasubata but stabs him instead, revealing he has been hypnotised by hypnosis cyberkinesis of Namekawa. Namekawa tries to hypnotise Kasubata, but Kasubata reflects the hypnosis back with sheer willpower. Kasubata summons a new weapon, shocking everyone watching.
10	"He's a Freezer-type"; Transliteration: "Sono Otoko, Tōketsu-kei" (Japanese: その男、凍結系)	Takuma Osada & Yoshiaki Okumura	Yuya Nakazono	Keiya Saitō	March 14, 2026
Kasubata summons a flaming Warhammer, revealing himself as a flamebaiter. He recalls that his mother was always sickly and when she died he learned she had seen an online video of his delinquent behaviour, and the shock weakened then killed her. To punish himself, he joined the exorcists and started posting hate comments against flamebaiters. Accepting his delinquent self and his flames he defeats Wagari. Soji surrenders after apologising for burning Akari's hairpin. Soji learns the only enemy left is Ashina, an ice cyberkinesis user obsessed with his own beauty who keeps having his accounts frozen for posting nudes. As only Soji has any battery left he must face Ashina alone. Nanzo is furious but Azaki reminds him having blue flames does not make Soji responsible for Sad Boy K's crimes. The teachers worry as the security they sent after the dead account have disappeared. Soji locates Ashina and finds he has murdered the security monks. Ashina claims he is tired of his accounts being frozen and wants to remain beautiful forever. He transforms into an ice angel and Azaki realises Ashina allowed Sad Boy K to turn him into a dead account. Ashina surrounds the fake city with an ice storm, preventing anyone entering or escaping.
11	"The A-B Alliance"; Transliteration: "Kōotsu Sōryoku-sen" (Japanese: 甲乙総力戦)	Yūsuke Nakagawa	Mitsutaka Hirota	Keiya Saitō	March 21, 2026
Flashbacks show Ashina is terrified of aging and dying, depriving the world of his beauty, to the point even A class despises him. When Sad Boy K began messaging him, he decided only Sad Boy K truly understood him. Ashina decides to kill all the students, even class A. A class decide to help but realise they all have drained batteries, so they can't. Ashina's ice proves capable of extinguishing Soji's flames by making his phone too cold to function, causing it to turn itself off. Emoto suddenly returns to protect Soji with his barrier. Flashbacks show he hates loud noises, since as a child his parents argued constantly. One day a kind neighbour gave him an old ipod with earphones so he wouldn't have to hear the arguing and he became so focused on the music he didn't notice he was crushing his parents in a barrier. Azaki found him and took him to become an exorcist. Thanks to Emoto Soji's phone recovers, but Ashina almost stabs him. He is saved by Urusugawa, just as both A and B class arrive to fight together, having recovered some power by Namekawa hypnotising them to sleep. Meanwhile, the real Haijima is shown climbing Ashina's giant ice sculpture with her Denmi battle bot.
12	"The Hot Springs Town After the Thaw"; Transliteration: "Yukidoke no Onsen Machi" (Japanese: 雪解けの温泉街)	Keiya Saitō	Mitsutaka Hirota	Keiya Saitō	March 28, 2026
Wagari, Kasubata and Surugi destroy Ashina's ice wings. Haijima tries to take control of the giant ice sculpture, but being ice it shatters instead. Distracted by the sculptures loss, Ashina is trapped by Urusugawa's slime and Soji knocks him to the ground. To prevent him being interrogated Sad Boy K sets Ashina on fire remotely, so Wagari mercy kills him. As his account is deleted Class A assure Ashina they still have photographs of his beauty so he won't be forgotten. With his last words Ashina reveals Sad Boy K's goal is the Land of Dead Accounts. Everyone returns to Miden to feast in memory of an exorcist who died. Nanzo admits he was wrong about Soji. Sad Boy K regrets Ashina's death but is cheered up by his subordinate Garan. Everyone shares a hot spring after the feast as a bonding experience, even the girls, as they recall their battle with Ashina and forgive their past as enemies. Everyone returns to training preparing for their eventual battle when Soji is determined he will exorcise Sad Boy K once and for all.

== See also ==
- Real Account, another manga series illustrated by Shizumu Watanabe
