= Rose Hip Rose =

Japanese manga series

- First volume cover
- Genre: Girls with guns
- Manga
- Written by: Tooru Fujisawa
- Published by: Kodansha
- English publisher: NA: Tokyopop
- Magazine: Young Magazine Uppers
- Original run: 2002 – 2003
- Volumes: 4

Rose Hip Rose is a Japanese manga series written and illustrated by Tooru Fujisawa. It was serialized in Kodansha's Young Magazine Uppers from 2002 until its discontinuation in October 2004. The story would continue with the new name, Magnum Rose Hip, on the page of Shōnen Magazine. A prequel to the series, Rose Hip Zero, was published in 2005–2006. Rose Hip Rose's first volume was released in English by Tokyopop on March 12, 2008, after Rose Hip Zero had been published.

The series primarily follows Kasumi Asakura, a.k.a. Rose Hip. An amnesiac teenage high school girl, she blends in with the local high school population while fighting off criminals and terrorists with her amazing martial arts and firearms skills.

== Plot ==
The manga tells the story of a high school kid named Shouhei Aiba, who mysteriously bumped into a nerdy high school female named Kasumi Asakura. At first, Shouhei thinks that Kasumi was being strange for her acrobatic skills and ability to tell different people from the crowd.

Later on, Shouhei discovers that Kasumi is actually an anti-terrorist specialist named Rose Hip. Rose Hip, lately, was ordered to engage a right-wing terrorist group led by a man whose codename is Goat. The two soon get wind of his plot to overthrow the elected Japanese government by taking hostages at the Tokyo Metropolitan Government Building and destroying it with explosives.

== Characters ==
=== Main ===
Kasumi Asakura
A 17-year-old high school student with a severe case of amnesia, she was trained at a young age after going through surgery as an assassin. She is known as No Murder Angel for using rubber bullets in her firearms.
Shouhei Aiba
A local high school student, he gets tangled up with recent attacks on civilians in Tokyo by armed men and the later plot to bomb the Tokyo Metropolitan Government Building.
Natsuki Toutera
Kasumi's old ASALLT friend was when the two were being indoctrinated as child soldiers. She had transferred to Shouhei's high school to meet with Kasumi and teamed up with her to fight against Goat and his posse in the Tokyo Metropolitan Government Building crisis.

=== Supporting ===
Bob
He is Kasumi's ASALLT handler. Bob has links with the police force and uses the link to have Kasumi assist them in any way he can.
Maruyama
Kasumi's comrade in ASALLT. He was earlier involved in an operation to arrest Goat during a sting operation.
Goat
Nothing is known about him. He is a right-wing criminal and terrorist, believed to be taking orders from a teenage person named Kirito. Goat specializes in using involuntary hypnosis to either assassinate certain people or use them to make himself heard. He is also an explosives and close quarters combat expert as well.
He died in an explosion that took him and Kasumi out after being tied up near some explosives that he took to the Tokyo Metropolitan Government Building.
Kirito
Nothing is also known about him. Aside from being Goat's handler, he has a rose tattoo on his left hand. Kirito also sports white hair. Like Goat, he is an expert in involuntary hypnosis.
Kasumi remembers meeting Kirito before, although she did not have the chance to speak with him. This indicates that she and Kirito had undergone the same assassin training that the two teenagers had undergone.
