= Rose Hip Zero =

Japanese manga series

- First volume cover
- Manga
- Written by: Tooru Fujisawa
- Published by: Kodansha
- English publisher: NA: Tokyopop
- Magazine: Weekly Shōnen Magazine
- Original run: April 20, 2005 – March 15, 2006
- Volumes: 5

Rose Hip Zero is a Japanese manga series written and illustrated by Tooru Fujisawa. It serves as the prequel to Rose Hip Rose and was serialized in Kodansha's Weekly Shōnen Magazine from 2005 to 2006.

The manga shows more of Kasumi Asakura's past as a 14-year-old child assassin in service of a terrorist group called ALICE prior to joining up with ASALLT.

== Publication ==
Rose Hip Zero, written and illustrated by Tooru Fujisawa, was serialized in Kodansha's shōnen manga magazine Weekly Shōnen Magazine from April 20, 2005, to March 15, 2006. Kodansha collected its chapters in five tankōbon volumes, released from December 16, 2005, to August 17, 2006.

== Reception ==
Anime News Network's review of Rose Hip Zero have positive as well, stating that the manga was well done for using the "buddy cop"-style of relationship, similar to the Lethal Weapon series done in the 1990s, though Anime News Network critiques it for having Kasumi use non-lethal bullets in her weapons, which has "no place in a gritty police drama." Teenreads.com has even said that Rose Hip Zero is a fine read especially to those who prefer "shoot-'em-up action movies, police dramas, or even the flying-fists of Jackie Chan."
