= Galaxias (manga) =

Japanese manga series

- First tankōbon volume cover
- Genre: Adventure; Fantasy
- Manga
- Written by: Ao Hatesaka
- Published by: Kodansha
- English publisher: Kodansha (digital): NA: Kodansha USA
- Imprint: Shōnen Magazine Comics
- Magazine: Weekly Shōnen Magazine (July 17, 2024 – January 15, 2025); Magazine Pocket (February 5, 2025 – present)
- Original run: July 17, 2024 – present
- Volumes: 4
- icon

Galaxias (stylized in all caps) is a Japanese manga series written and illustrated by Ao Hatesaka. It was serialized in Kodansha's shōnen manga magazine Weekly Shōnen Magazine from July 2024 to January 2025 and transferred to the Magazine Pocket digital service in February 2025.

== Plot ==
More than ten years have passed since the assassination of the supreme leader, the Dragon King. In a corner of the kingdom where "dragonfolk"—people with the ability to grow a tail—live, a human girl named Geo longs for adventure and escaping the reality of life in the countryside.

Geo's life changes forever when she meet a mysterious amnesiac young man, whom she calls Neraid. On the way home, Geo is intercepted by Yerkes, a government dragon knight, who seeks to kill her, revealing that Geo is the daughter of Yuri Holst, a famous explorer who is being accused of assassinating the Dragon King. Neraid is revealed to be an extremely strong dragonfolk, and helps Geo escape. He is also looking for Yuri Holst, so he and Geo set off on a journey to find him and recover Neraid's memories.

== Publication ==
Written and illustrated by Ao Hatesaka, Galaxias was first published as a one-shot in Kodansha's shōnen manga magazine Weekly Shōnen Magazine on June 22, 2022. It started its serialization in the same magazine on July 17, 2024. On January 15, 2025, it was announced that the series would be transferred to the Magazine Pocket service where it resumed semi-monthly serialization on February 5 the same year. Kodansha released the first tankōbon volume on October 17, 2024. As of September 16, 2026, four volumes have been released.

The series is simultaneously published in English by Kodansha on its K Manga digital service. In July 2025, Kodansha USA announced that it has licensed the manga in North America, with the first volume set to be released in Q2 2026.

=== Volumes ===
No.	Original release date	Original ISBN	English release date	English ISBN
1	October 17, 2024	978-4-06-537126-8	February 24, 2026	979-8894788845
1. "Hello, World!!"; 2. "The Wagoner Town" (馬車乗りの街, Basha-nori no Machi); 3. "'Cuz I'm a Kangaroo" (カンガルーだけに, Kangarū Dake Ni); 4. "Ups and Downs" (山あり谷あり！, Yamaaritaniari!); 5. "King-Killer's Message" (王殺しのメッセージ, Ō Koroshi no Messēji)
2	February 17, 2025	978-4-06-537778-9	May 26, 2026	979-8888777121
6. "Flyby"; 7. "City of the White Hill" (白塚の町, Shiratsuka no Machi); 8. "That Dragon's Method" (その竜の流儀, Sono Ryū no Ryūgi); 9. "Knight Captain" (騎士団長, Kishi Danchō); 10. "Neraid vs. Chalk!!" (ネレイドvs.チョーク!!, Nereido vs. Chōku!!); 11. "Neraid vs. Chalk!! Pt. 2" (ネレイドvs.チョーク!!②, Nereido vs. Chōku!! 2); 12. "Neraid vs. Chalk!! Pt. 3" (ネレイドvs.チョーク!!③, Nereido vs. Chōku!! 3); 13. "Schmidt Zachmann" (シュミット・ザックマン, Shumitto Zakkuman); 14. "Setting Out and Onward" (出発進行！, Shuppatsu Shinkō!); 15. "Setting Out and Onward Pt. 2" (出発進行！②, Shuppatsu Shinkō! 2); 16. "The Royal Zodiacs" (王撰十二宮, Ō Sen Jūnikyū)
3	June 17, 2025	978-4-06-539762-6	August 25, 2026	979-8888777138
17. "The Fungus Kingdom" (菌類の王国, Kinrui no Ōkoku); 18. "Geo's Adventure" (ジオの冒険, Jio no Bōken); 19. "Fire Cover" (火蓋, Hibuta); 20. "Neraid vs. Antares!! Pt. 1" (ネレイドvs.アンタレス!!, Nereido vs. Antaresu!!) (Note: Titled ネレイドvs.アンタレス!!① on Magazine Pocket); 21. "The Kingdom's Strongest Warrior" (国家最高戦力, Kokka Saikō Senryoku); 22. "Correct Choice" (正しい選択, Tadashii Sentaku); 23. "Perigee" (近地点, Kinchiten); 24. "My Fault" (私のせい, Watashi no Sei); 25. "Fighter" (ファイター, Faitā); 26. "Beacon" (狼煙, Noroshi)
4	September 16, 2026	978-4-06-544977-6	—	—
27. "WIP" (列聖, Ressei); 28. "196 People" (196人, 196-nin); 29. "Playing Adventurer" (冒険家ごっこ, Bōkenka-gokko); 30. "Activity"; 31. "Rat in a Trap" (袋のネズミ, Fukuro no Nezumi); 32. "Go Big or Go Extinct"; 33. "Challenger's Morals" (挑戦者の道徳, Chōsensha no Dōtoku); 34. "Schmidt vs. Kerner" (シュミットvs.ケルナー, Shumitto vs. Kerunā); 35. "Climax" (佳境, Kakyō)

== Reception ==
The one-shot pilot received the Special Manga Award of Weekly Shōnen Magazine's 108th Rookie Manga Award in 2022. It was commended by then–Weekly Shōnen Magazine editor-in-chief Hirotoshi Kurita and Blue Lock authors Muneyuki Kaneshiro and Yusuke Nomura. The series was nominated for the 11th Next Manga Awards in the print category in 2025; it was also nominated in the web category in 2026.
