= Gacha Gacha =

Japanese manga series

- First tankōbon volume cover

ガチャガチャ
- Genre: Romantic comedy
- Manga
- Written by: Hiroyuki Tamakoshi
- Published by: Kodansha
- English publisher: NA: Del Rey Manga
- Imprint: Shōnen Magazine Comics
- Magazine: Weekly Shōnen Magazine; (August 7, 2002 – June 18, 2003); Magazine Special; (July 19, 2003 – October 20, 2007)
- Original run: August 7, 2002 – October 20, 2007
- Volumes: 16
- icon

Gacha Gacha (ガチャガチャ) is a Japanese manga series written and illustrated by Hiroyuki Tamakoshi. It consists of two separate stories with different characters each. The first one was serialized in Kodansha's shōnen manga magazine Weekly Shōnen Magazine from August 2002 to June 2003. The second story, known as Gacha Gacha: The Next Revolution, was serialized in Magazine Special from July 2003 to October 2007. The overall series' chapters were collected in 16 tankōbon volumes: the first part was collected in five volumes, and the second in 11 volumes. In North America, the manga was licensed by Del Rey Manga; the second part was released as Gacha Gacha: The Next Revolution.

== Plot ==
=== Gacha Gacha ===
Kouhei Nanjou has been classmates with Kurara Hanazono since elementary school, and he has recently realized that he has developed a crush on her. However, after a fateful trip to Hawaii, Kurara has started to behave oddly at times—specifically acting extremely promiscuous and flirting shamelessly for short periods, then remembering nothing. Kouhei is often the target of this flirtatious and exhibitionist behavior, leaving him to take the blame when Kurara returns to normal.

After one such episode, leaving Kouhei—and Kurara—in an uncomfortable position, Kurara tells Kouhei that she now has multiple personality disorder, with her other, uninhibited, personality being named Arisa. After her confession she enlists Kouhei's help in dealing with her while the Arisa personality is in control, as well as covering up the existence of her embarrassing promiscuous side from other people.

As Kouhei and Kurara try their best to control Arisa, several other personalities emerge: Alice, the young, questioning adolescent; Rin, the martial arts expert; and Meow, a housecat. As Kouhei and Kurara try their best to remove the disorder while controlling the wild and wacky personalities that emerge, their relationship begins to grow into love.

=== Gacha Gacha: The Next Revolution ===
The story revolves around a malfunction at the Gacha Gacha virtual reality game, which has since gone retail after the events in the Capsule story arc. The malfunction causes the main character, an unlucky young man named Akira Hatsushiba, to transform into a young girl whenever he sneezes. The body is the tutorial character's body with which he was interacting when the Gacha Gacha game crashed. He later finds out that eating natto (fermented soybeans) would transform the girl form (Akira-chan) into a taller and much more buxom form.

Akira uses his newfound body to learn more about women, specifically getting closer and improving his relationship with the girl with whom he is infatuated, Yurika Sakuraba.

== Characters ==
=== Gacha Gacha ===
Kouhei Nanjou
A dopey high schooler who has been friends from childhood with Clara. Early on in the story, he realizes his feelings for her. As the story progresses, he comes to be slightly smitten with the other AIs imprinted in Clara's mind. He has an unwavering love for Clara and would do anything for her. He understands Clara to the point of being able to tell a perfect copy of Clara from the real Clara. He loves gyudon and that is pretty much the only thing he ever eats.
Kurara Hanazono
The daughter of Karin Hanazono. (Kurara Hanazono is known as Clara Hanazono in English translation.) She is the heroine of the story and also Kouhei's love interest. She is bossy and sometimes mean to Kouhei but she comes to realize how much she loves him. In the middle of the story, Kurara's condition and how she acquired it is revealed to Kouhei by Karin. Her condition of multiple split personalities is the cause of a malfunction of the GachaGachaX2 virtual reality machine, where her curiosity caused major bugs and errors to surface and have the AIs of the game imprinted into her brain. When she changes personality, her mind goes blank and she can not remember what the AIs have done. The exception is the Original 4, the four AIs that serve as models for any future AIs. With the Original 4, Clara is able to still be conscious while the AIs are controlling her. The Original 4 are also able to change Clara's appearance to how they look.
Reona Grace Hitachi
An exotic beauty from the United States of America. She becomes one of Kouhei's lovers. A super genius with an IQ of 200, she graduated from Harvard at the age of 13, and came to the Rose Corporation for a job as an S Class programmer. She was originally sent by the Rose Corporation to take care of Clara but after watching Kouhei protect her, she realized that Kouhei was better suited to the job than she ever could be. Later, she flies back to America to give the data she collected on Clara to the Rose Corporation to analyze. She is skilled in aikido and, despite being a super genius, is naive about love. She and Clara both appear in the final chapter of "Secret" in order to help restore Akira to his normal self.
Noda
A popular boy in Clara and Kouhei's class. A handsome boy and pro soccer player, he's adored by many. After mistaking 'Rin' for Clara, Noda becomes determined to kiss Clara during a performance of "Snow White". But Clara (mistaken for Rin by Kouhei) punches Noda at the last second, an act which only strengthens Noda's feelings.
Karin Hanazono
Clara's mother. A young beauty despite being a mother, she is the CEO of the famous gaming company, Rose. She invented the GachaGachaX2 machine. She is slightly unconscious of her outward appearance as she is sometimes seen scratching herself under her shirt in public.
Alissa
One of Clara's split personalities and an AI. She is completely shameless and will often reveal cleavage or upskirt panty shots to anyone. She once even fondled one of Clara's friends. Once the Original 4 show up, she ceases to appear again in the real world. She dresses in a very skimpy fashion.
Alice
Another of Clara's less powerful AIs. Alice is completely innocent at grade 8, age 14. She often asks embarrassing questions such as "Are bigger breasts better?" or "What does a guy's parts look like?" Once the Original 4 show up, she ceases to appear again in the real world. She dresses in a very cute, lolita way.
Rin
One of the weaker AIs residing in Clara's mind. She is a strong martial arts expert and is very dangerous due to her great strength and skill. She has a weakness regarding her breasts in that she is very sensitive physically and mentally about them. Once the Original 4 show up, she ceases to appear again in the real world.
Meow
The personality of a kitten AI in Clara which acts exactly like a real kitten would. In its first appearance, it fights a cat gang boss and accidentally makes Clara the cat gang boss. Once the Original 4 show up, it ceases to appear again in the real world
Ayame
One the original 4. Ayame is a ninja AI with amazing ninja skills such as pinpoint shuriken throwing, and cloning techniques. She has a sexual interest in Kouhei.
Kiriko
One of the Original 4. Kiriko has a cute, lively personality. She often hits Kouhei in a playful manner. She is one of the AIs Kouhei feels very close to. She also has a strong sixth sense and can tell when Kouhei is hedging, often straightening him out.
Ran Ran
Another of the Original 4. She is a master of the Drunken Fist martial arts style and is a heavy drinker. Despite being a heavy drinker and using Clara's body, she is able to hold her liquor very well.
01
The last, most powerful and dangerous AI. She/it is the original basis for all AIs and is able to copy any personality, including Clara's. She/it copies Clara and tries to get close to Kouhei, but Kouhei sees through the nearly perfect veil. As a result, she/it gets extremely angered and attempts to delete all the personalities in Clara's mind, including Clara herself. Somehow, 01 fails to delete Clara and gets deleted herself.
Umeda
A pervert living in his own delusional world, he is Kouhei's best friend. In his class, he was voted by the girls as "the guy you would least like to date or be with". He all but disappears later in the story.

=== Gacha Gacha: Next Revolution ===
Akira Hatsushiba
A 17-year-old boy in his senior year of high school. A huge fan of pornographic material, he was seen by the girl he likes while trying to rent porn at the local video store. He is a pervert that gets massive nosebleeds whenever he is aroused. Also, he is very thickheaded and clumsy, giving him almost no chance with women. However, he does have good points. He has been complemented for his unwavering willpower, his dependability and sometime cool behavior despite his usual dorky demeanor. Even though, as the story progresses, he receives favorable attention and romantic feelings from the many girls he knows, he only has eyes for Yurika Sakuraba.
His most important secret in the manga is that when he sneezes he becomes a girl with blond hair and a somewhat underdeveloped body with a "cute" charm rather than a mature sexy charm. This leads him to get into some unfortunate (and hilarious) situations. He originally uses his female form to successfully become friends with Yurika Sakuraba and continues to use it when he feels like being with Yurika. He resorts to using a "koyori string" to make himself sneeze and become a girl whenever he pleases. As a girl he gets himself into places and situations he never could have imagined as a boy. He also transforms into a girl to gather information about the girls and accompany them to baths, hot springs, lingerie stores and so on.
Akira Hatsushiba (female)
She is Akira Hatsushiba's female form. She was caused by a computer error during a dating game with Kikuchi. Even though she's a girl, she retains the mind and personality of Akira (original male form). She develops a friendship with the Sakuraba sisters. Kikuchi also falls for her, although with disastrous consequences. It is later found that eating natto in this form will transform the form (Akira-chan) into a taller and much more buxom form.
Yurika Sakuraba
The goddess in the eyes of Akira Hatsushiba. She can be somewhat naive and innocent, which is a part of her charm. She works at her uncle's coffee and cake shop called Rock Stock, and works as both a waitress and a patissier. She loves to eat and make cakes. She has feelings for Hatsushiba, but she cannot readily admit that she has those feelings to herself. In the final chapter, she kisses a comatose Hatsushiba. After Hatsushiba awakens she played dumb when asked if she did anything while he was out.
Sakuraba Anju
Yurika Sakuraba's younger sister. She is a returnee from France, where she was staying with her parents. She is first mistaken by Hatsushiba for a boy and he accidentally walks in on her while she is changing. She holds a second dan in karate and is in very good shape, which allows her to beat up Hatsushiba whenever he does something inappropriate. As the series progresses, she falls for Hatsushiba more and more and tries to get his attention and his love. However, she has trouble due to Akira's thickheadedness. She also has tough competition in the form of her sister, whom Hatsushiba loves. She is also self conscious of her figure, since she is not as voluptuous as her sister or her mother. Near the end she returns to France, but not before learning of Hatsushiba's secret and who he has his heart set on.
Sakuraba Ran
The mother of Anju and Yurika. She also has a very attractive figure despite her age, and was first mistaken by Hatsushiba to be a "gyakunan" (a woman who hangs around trying to hook up with men—someone who practices reverse nanpa). She also seems to have a rather frightening side to her personality. She is fickle and loves to tease her daughters, or in this case, sexually harass them. She is also very perceptive and easily discerns that Akira-chan and Hatsushiba are one and the same.
Yun Haruna
A girl in the same class as Yurika Sakuraba and Akira Hatsushiba, she is introduced midway through the series as being a classmate who has known Akira since middle school. She is an artist and loves to draw. Her parents own a Chinese restaurant where she lives as well. She volunteers to help Akira with the cultural festival activity because she wants to be in the inner group of friends that Akira hangs out with since they always seem to be having a good time. She can also be straightforward and direct in the things she says, very often offending Hatsushiba, which is not to say she that does not have any feelings for him though.
Masamune Kikuchi
Akira's best friend. Partners in crime in all their perverted activities whether it be masturbating to porn, renting porn, searching for porno mags or watching porno mags, they are inseparable. He seems to be rather rich, owning a hot spring resort villa, and being engaged to an equally rich fiancée, Morinoin Mitsuba. Like Akira, the other girls (other than his fiancée) do not seem to think much of him. He is also madly in love with the female Akira, not knowing it is his sex-changed best friend. He also often accompanies Hatsushiba and the girls in their adventures.
Morinoin Mitsuba
She is Kikuchi's fiancée. She is treated rather poorly by Kikuchi, who wants nothing to do with her. She is extremely giddy and would do anything in order to get Kikuchi's attention and his love because she truly loves him. She finds herself in competition with Akira (female) to get Kikuchi's attention despite Akira not wanting it in the first place. She also owns a deserted island where she brings everyone on a private beach party, where she plans to attack Kikuchi head on and earn his love.

== Publication ==
Written and illustrated by Hiroyuki Tamakoshi, Gacha Gacha was serialized in Kodansha's shōnen manga magazine Weekly Shōnen Magazine from August 7, 2002, to June 18, 2003, (Note: The series was published until the magazine's 29th issue of 2003 (cover date July 2), released on June 18 of the same year.) The second part was serialized in Magazine Special from July 19, 2003, to October 20, 2007. Kodansha collected its chapters in 16 tankōbon volumes, released from December 17, 2002, to December 17, 2007.

In North America, the manga was licensed by Del Rey Manga. The first five volumes were released from August 30, 2005, to August 26, 2006. The second part, released as Gacha Gacha: The Next Revolution, was published in 11 volumes from December 26, 2006, to March 23, 2010.
