= Pastel (manga) =

Japanese manga series

- First tankōbon volume cover

ぱすてる (Pasuteru)
- Genre: Romantic comedy
- Manga
- Written by: Toshihiko Kobayashi
- Published by: Kodansha
- English publisher: NA: Del Rey Manga
- Magazine: Weekly Shōnen Magazine; (July 24, 2002 – July 16, 2003); Magazine Special; (September 20, 2003 – January 20, 2017)
- Original run: July 24, 2002 – January 20, 2017
- Volumes: 44
- icon

Pastel (Japanese: ぱすてる, Hepburn: Pasuteru) is a Japanese manga written and illustrated by Toshihiko Kobayashi. It was first serialized in Kodansha's shōnen manga magazine Weekly Shōnen Magazine from July 2002 to July 2003, then moved to Magazine Special in September 2003 and finished in January 2017. Its chapters were collected in 44 tankōbon volumes. It was published in North America by Del Rey Manga; only the first 14 volumes were released.

== Plot ==
Sixteen-year-old Mugi Tadano tries to shake off his latest heartbreak by working at his friend's aunt's beach-side inn. One day he spies on a beautiful girl, Yuu Tsukisaki, changing clothes in an alley behind the inn. Instead of getting angry, Yuu charges him the price of a soda for watching her. The next day Mugi is set up on a blind date with Yuu, and they have a great time—until Mugi walks in on Yuu in the middle of her bath. Yuu decides to leave on the next ferry out, leaving Mugi heartbroken again. However, when he returns home, he is surprised to find that Yuu and her younger sister Tsukasa are going to be his housemates, as their parents were mutual friends.

The series follows Mugi's adventures with his new roommates. In the first few days, Tsukasa leaves the two of them alone. Mugi's classmate and childhood friend Manami shows interest in Mugi but later supports their relationship. Yuu attracts several boys and even visits her hometown over in Tokyo, making Mugi so jealous that he follows her, and ends up meeting his ex. Other girls visit their household, including Mugi's big sister-like childhood friend Sayuri who has become a model, and classmate Kiku Murakami, who tries unsuccessfully to smear Yuu's reputation.

Mugi discovers he has a talent for cooking, and meets Tetsu Shiba, an owner of a small restaurant, and Aoi Sonobe, a young woman who likes Tetsu. Yuu and Tsukasa's mother visits and wants to take her back. Tsukasa senses that Mugi likes Yuu, so she tries to set him up as much as she can. Sayuri gets engaged. Kazumi tells Mugi that he likes Manami and wants to date her. A busty young woman, Mako Minamino, joins the household as Mugi's father's love interest. After numerous missed opportunities, Mugi finally confesses to Yuu that he likes her and they become a couple.

Later stories involve more girls and relationships, including schoolmate Urara Haruno who has a reputation for dressing sexily, her sister Moe who enjoys reading romance novels, Tooko who is a Japanese idol in love with Mugi, and Tsukasa's friend Pepper from America who joins the household. While Mugi and Yuu still try to figure out how to advance their relationship they see their friends hooking up: Sayuri gets married, Tetsu and Aoi agree to sign a marriage certificate, and even Mako and Mugi's father sign one.

== Characters ==
In the bonus comic "The Pastel Meeting", Kobayashi sketched a meeting with his editor where they ended up talking about the appeal of Japanese actresses/models Aoi Miyazaki, Yū Aoi, and Leah Dizon, who became the inspirations for the stories in Pastel.^{Vol. 1}

=== Main characters ===
Mugi Tadano (只野 麦, Tadano Mugi)
Mugi is a high school boy who has lived by himself most of his life because of his mother’s death and his father’s being away for work. His friends describe him as plain, (Note: Mugi's name is sometimes translated as common wheat (tada no mugi)) yet responsible and dependable.^{Ch. 1-4} He falls in love with Yuu at first sight, and has sexual fantasies about her after she begins living with him. In order to not compromise their living situation, he suppresses his thoughts, and holds back from expressing his feelings for her, preferring to just protect her.^{Ch. 4, 26, 50} Despite often stumbling into compromising situations with girls, and having to go along with their demands for his time and attention, he refuses their confessions because he likes Yuu the most.^{Ch. 13} After being encouraged multiple times by his friends, he finally confesses to Yuu and has his feelings reciprocated.^{Vol. 14}
Yuu Tsukisaki (月咲 ゆう, Tsukisaki Yū)
The cover girl of the series and Mugi's love interest, Yuu accepts Mugi's father's offer to live with Mugi after her father dies.^{Ch. 1} She is good-natured, smart and responsible (lacking only some cooking skills and handiwork), described as being very cute with a developed body.^{Ch. 1-4} She is popular in school and has an easy time making friends.^{Ch. 16} Even though she returns to live with her mother, she later returns to Mugi's place the next summer to finish high school.^{Ch. 47, 48} Although at times she has denied having romantic interest in Mugi, she gets jealous when he receives affections from girls that are not his childhood friends.^{Ch. 52, 66, 71, 80} As of the end of volume 14, she stops denying her own feelings, and responds to Mugi's confession.^{Ch. 80} Some of the later chapters are presented from her perspective.^{Ch. 101, 102}

=== Supporting characters ===
Tsukasa Tsukisaki (月咲 つかさ, Tsukisaki Tsukasa)
Yuu’s younger sister, Tsukasa is a vibrant, mayhem-causing character who loves attention.^{Ch. 7} She is more knowledgeable about relationships than her older sister, and often embarrasses Mugi by guessing his perverted thoughts,^{Ch. 24} although she herself does not engage in such activity. She sometimes hatches elaborate plans for Yuu and Mugi to be together. She initially lives with Yuu and Mugi,^{Ch. 2} but later moves to live with her mother, and lives in America.^{Ch. 50} When she returns to Japan, her body has matured so that she can impersonate her sister by donning a wig.^{Ch. 56-57} She also likes to hide in the walls to spy on Mugi and Yuu.^{Ch. 113, 126}
Kazuki Sanmiya (三宮 一機, Sanmiya Kazuki)
Mugi’s best friend since childhood. In the first chapter, Mugi remarks that he looks about 20 years old.^{Ch. 1} Most girls that he flirts with flatly reject him; those who do not usually slap him because he is too forward.^{Ch. 1, 9, 49} On his 18th birthday, he confesses to Manami, having liked her for over a decade but keeping silent beforehand because she liked Mugi.^{Ch. 59} After they begin dating, he cleans up his act a little in order to feel that he is deserving of her.^{Ch. 63}
Manami Sakiya (崎谷 まなみ, Sakiya Manami)
She is one of Mugi’s childhood friends.^{Ch. 9} She harbors a crush on Mugi, but holds back her confession because he was dating her friend Hinako.^{Ch. 10, 14} She later confesses to Mugi, but is turned down as he has fallen in love with Yuu.^{Ch. 47, 48} She is later shocked when Kazuki confesses she has liked her for ten years, but later realizes they care about each other, and agrees to date him.^{Ch. 59}
Sayuri Watase (渡瀬 さゆり, Watase Sayuri)
Mugi’s next-door neighbor who acts like his big sister.^{Ch. 26, 50} After Mugi's mother died, Sayuri watched over him and even taught him how to cook. She is a Tokyo University student and a model. She occasionally visits Mugi where she binges on beer and plays Tekken with Tsukasa.^{Ch. 26} She so values her relationship with Mugi that she introduces her fiance Takumi to him before she does to her parents.^{Ch. 60} She and Takumi marry.^{Ch. 94}
Kiku Murakami (村上 菊, Murakami Kiku)
Kiku is a popular schoolmate that the main characters meet on a group date. She likes to tease guys and use them for her own entertainment, but is piqued when Mugi resists her advances. After seeing how popular and innocent Yuu is, she pretends to be her friend, but secretly tries to sully her reputation by taking scandalous pictures of herself dressed up like Yuu, and spreading them to their schoolmates.^{Ch. 27-30} She returns in a later storyline at the beach-side inn. Although she no longer puts up an innocent act, she is still popular with guys and is quite flirtatious, but refuses to get into any relationships with them. She still likes Mugi, believing that his relationship with Yuu will not last,^{Ch. 71-72} and ponders when they might break up. She later becomes friends with Urara, who has an opposite personality to her.^{Ch. 124}
Ken Tadano (只野 健, Tadano Ken)
Mugi’s father is a photographer who is often away from home for long periods of time so that Mugi is never sure when he visits. He makes a promise with Yuu and Tsukasa's father that he would take care of his daughters.^{Ch. 2} He briefly returns to check up on Mugi, Yuu and Mako; the latter tells him that she has fallen in love again, reminding him of a promise he had made to her when they first met that when she ever does, he would give her a reward.^{Ch. 98} When she hints that it is him, he simply smiles and signs his half of the marriage certificate.^{Ch. 98}
Tetsu Shiba (志波 哲, Shiba Tetsu)
Tetsu is the owner of a small restaurant; he offers Mugi and Yuu refuge when they get caught in the rain. After tasting Mugi’s cooking, he offers him a part-time job and becomes his cooking mentor.^{Ch. 35, 36} He has an Imari plate collection that dwindles whenever Aoi visits and gets angry.^{Ch. 38, 120} Although Aoi likes him a lot, Tetsu tries not to return her affections because he wants her to be free.^{Ch. 37} He and Aoi often argue.^{Ch. 52}, but eventually Tetsu accepts Aoi's feelings, and the two become a couple.^{Ch. 88} When Tetsu was younger, he and Ken were rivals for Mugi's mother's affection.^{Ch. 120} It is revealed that he and Aoi had filled out a marriage registration form, which they turn in to the courthouse later.^{Ch. 131}
Aoi Sonobe (園辺 あおい, Sonobe Aoi)
Aoi is a young traveling artist who frequents Tetsu’s restaurant. Although she likes to hug and kiss people,^{Ch. 36-37} she has feelings for Tetsu, and gets jealous whenever he brushes her off or mentions liking older women.^{Ch. 42} In the end, when Aoi finally gets tired of Tetsu after hearing from him that he was getting an omiai, she resolves to leave. Before she does, Tetsu catches up to her and asks her to come back to him, promising her that he would give her happiness.^{Ch. 89} She and Tetsu fill out a marriage registration form, but she does not submit it until the end of the chapter when she thinks she is pregnant.^{Ch. 131}
Mako Minamino (南野 マコ, Minamino Mako)
Mako is a busty woman who joins the Tadano household as Mugi's new mother.^{Ch. 65} Ken met her in Alaska when he was taking pictures during the Aurora Borealis, where she was mourning the third anniversary of her high school sweetheart’s death. Being only five years older than Mugi,^{Ch. 65} she enjoys suggesting activities with Mugi that Yuu deems inappropriate, and plays games that have a sexual twist, such as strip rock-paper-scissors, with uncanny good luck.^{Ch. 67, 83} She reveals that she and Ken have not married or planned a wedding yet,^{Ch. 67} but later on reveals that she does love Ken.^{Ch. 98} She becomes Mugi and Yuu's homeroom teacher,^{Ch. 97} and Mugi's official stepmother after Ken signs his half of the marriage certificate.^{Ch. 98, 130}
Urara Haruno (春野 うらら, Haruno Urara)
Urara is introduced as a schoolmate in Mugi's after-school supplementary class. She has a reputation of being ero kawaii (a combination of being erotic but cute) because of her sexy dress and appearance, although she is unaware of her effects on others.^{Ch. 105, 123, 124} Yuu is initially jealous of her when she sees her hanging around with Mugi,^{Ch. 85, 101} but she learns that Urara has a crush on a childhood friend who plays basketball and looks up to Yuu as a role model.^{Ch. 101}
Moe Haruno (春野 萌, Haruno Moe)
Urara's younger sister who wears glasses. She is described as shy and a bookworm, but well-endowed like her sister.^{Ch. 93, 101, 105, 123} She aspires to be a novelist and solicits Mugi's help to write a story on what it's like to live with Yuu, whom she idolizes.^{Ch. 93} She is a bit airheaded and clumsy, often falling to the floor in a sexy position and losing her glasses.^{Ch. 93, 101} She is an otaku, and prefers falling in love with the guy character in the novels she reads, and has a fear of guys besides Mugi (who she thinks of more like a female friend) and his father (upon whom she gets a brief crush).^{Ch. 130}
Pepper (ペッパー, Peppā)
Tsukasa's schoolmate and buddy from America, Pepper is a blonde-haired girl who joins Tsukasa when she returns to Japan. She flirts with Mugi quite a bit when they initially meet. She has a black belt in karate, and also does other martial arts such as judo and aikido. She was born in Japan and adopted after birth. Her biological father proposed to her mother in Onomichi, and she was named after the seasoning when they ate at Tetsu's restaurant. Ken agrees to adopt her into the Tadano family. ^{Vol. 23}
Mikan (みかん)
Named after the Mandarin orange box she was found in, Mikan is a kitten that joins the Tadano household.^{Ch. 25} She stars in a side story in Pastel as well as some of its chapters where she muses about Mugi and Yuu's slowly developing relationship.^{Vol. 25}^{Ch. 125}
Mametarou (豆太郎)
Yuu's St. Bernard whom she got on her birthday when she was little. He was named after the snack.^{Ch. 2}^{Ch. 39}

=== Minor characters ===
Hinako Kayama (加山 ひな子, Kayama Hinako)
Manami’s best friend and Mugi's former girlfriend, having broken up with Mugi prior to the start of the series when she left for Tokyo for school.^{Ch. 1} She is very accident prone, and compatible with Mugi and his supportive personality. During Mugi's trip to Tokyo, it is revealed that she still has feelings for him.^{Ch. 21-24} In a return visit, it is revealed that her relationship with Mugi had progressed so slowly, that Kazuki and Manami forged love letters to get them together, and they technically had not broken up. Although she has dated many guys, she still has feelings for Mugi and confesses to him one more time, but is turned down when Mugi replies that he likes Yuu.^{Ch. 75-78} In the afterword of volume 14, Kobayashi noted that he brought back Hinako Kayama because of her popularity with readers, giving her a story that spanned five chapters.^{Vol. 14}
Yuu and Tsukasa’s mother (岩井, Iwai)
She divorced her husband when her daughters were still in elementary school because she could not handle the long period of time in which he was away. When she remarried, she let Yuu and Tsukasa live with the Tadanos so as to not cause conflict with her new family.^{Ch. 43} After taking Yuu and Tsukasa back, she reconciles with her second husband as her stepson has moved out of the house;^{Ch. 47} she and Tsukasa relocate with her husband to the United States.^{Ch. 50}
Yuu and Tsukasa's father
A former rival photographer and friend of Ken Tadano. Both were in members of the photography club in university. Because he was away for long periods of time from his family, he and his wife divorced when Yuu and Tsukasa were in elementary school. However, he later retires to take care of his daughters.^{Ch. 41} His death at the start of the series places Yuu and Tsukasa under the care of the Tadanos.^{Ch. 2}
Yūji Tachibana (立花 優時, Tachibana Yūji)
A good-looking and popular schoolmate who asks Yuu out early in the series. Although Yuu agrees to go out with him, she only thinks of him as a friend.^{Ch. 17-18} His father owns a restaurant that does French cuisine.^{Ch. 18} He later helps Yuu make a cake.^{Ch. 84} When Yuu refuses his confession, and he notices her with Mugi, he does not believe they are actually a couple.^{Ch. 96} In a later chapter, he has a girlfriend.^{Ch. 102}
Hana Hanayama (花山 花, Hanayama Hana)
A daughter of one of Tetsu’s friends who owns a restaurant. Mugi works for her for a week, after which Mugi discovers she is a year younger in his school. Yuu is jealous of her because Hana acts quite friendly with Mugi, walking with him to school and bringing him lunch.^{Ch. 52-53}
Takumi Shijou (四条 拓実, Shijō Takumi)
He is introduced as Sayuri’s fiancé. He works at a small second-hand furniture shop. The first time he sees her, he proposes to her, but after dating, she eventually accepts. He likes to repair people's stuff even when not asked. Unlike Sayuri, he does not drink alcohol, and prefers tomato juice.^{Ch. 60, 94} Although he loses their wedding rings, he is able to reconcile with Sayuri and presents her with a wood-carved ring that matches his. He also presents a pair for Mugi and Yuu.^{Ch. 94}
Tooko
Tooko is a young actress from the agency that Sayuri works with. She introduces herself as Mugi’s younger sister, and uses a wig to disguise herself.^{Ch. 109} She takes breaks from her acting duties, and likes being affectionate with Mugi, declaring Yuu her rival,^{Ch. 111} and occasionally bragging to Yuu about it with text messages.^{Ch. 111, 123}

== Publication ==
Written and illustrated by Toshihiko Kobayashi, Pastel was serialized in Kodansha's shōnen manga magazine Weekly Shōnen Magazine from July 24, 2002, to July 16, 2003. The series was then transferred to Magazine Special, where it ran from September 20, 2003, to January 20, 2017. Kodansha collected its chapters in 44 tankōbon volumes, released from November 13, 2002, to February 17, 2017.

In North America, the manga was licensed by Del Rey Manga. 14 volumes were released from December 27, 2005, to September 29, 2009. before the company ceased its manga publishing business in 2010.

=== Volumes ===
==== Volumes 1–14 ====
No.	Title	Original release date	English release date
1	I Love Yuu	November 13, 2002; 978-4-06-363175-3	December 27, 2005; 978-0345486271
1. The Night the Moon Laughed; 2. I Want to Protect You; 3. The Burden of Love; 4. Living Together; English language edition contains 5 color plates.; Behind the Scenes extra: The Pastel Meeting
Mugi Tadano is working at a beach-side inn with his friend Kazuki, who tries to get him to look at the pretty girls in the area in order to get over his recent breakup. Mugi spots a beautiful girl changing, but she notices his spying and charges him the cost of a drink. Kazuki sets up a blind double date where Mugi is paired with the girl, whose name is Yuu Tsukisaki. They have a good time, but when he accidentally walks into her in the bath, she slaps him, and leaves on the ferry, which Mugi is unable to catch to apologize. However, he is surprised to find that Yuu and her sister Tsukasa are going to be staying at his house, at the generous invitation of his father. Mugi takes the two girls under his wing as his father departs for a photography assignment. While Tsukasa is out for an event, and the upstairs room is drenched by the rain, Yuu and Mugi have to share the same room and end up in some potentially embarrassing situations. As they visit town, the locals wonder if they are a couple.
2	Love Triangle	December 14, 2002; 978-4-06-363181-4	March 28, 2006; 978-0345486288
5. The Long Day; 6. The Secret Pair; 7. Three Kids, One Roof; 8. Good Luck to an Honest Man!; 9. Old Friends; 10. A Midsummer's Triangle?; 11. A Night at the Summer Festival; 12. Fragments of Love; 13. Graduating From Friendship; Behind the Scenes extra: At Work on Pastel 1.; Behind the Scenes extra: At Work on Pastel 2.
Mugi scrambles to hide Yuu when Kuzuki visits; however, Yuu was in the bath and does not have a change of clothes. When Tsukasa finds an adult video in the attic, she makes Mugi unpack her stuff and then has him take her out on a date. On a visit to the beach, Mugi encounters his childhood friend Manami Sakiya, who has grown up to be quite attractive; she reveals to Yuu that she likes Mugi. During a summer festival event, Mugi and Manami are split from the rest of the group, but Mugi searches for Yuu. When Yuu and Tsukasa go out during a rainstorm, Manami visits. But when Yuu returns and sees Mugi with a naked Manami, she slaps him. Yuu later apologizes to Mugi as she figured it was another misunderstanding. Mugi visits Manami’s house to return her bag.
3	Back to School	February 7, 2003; 978-4-06-363206-4	June 27, 2006; 978-0345486899
14. Second Love; 15. Women...; 16. A Stormy New Semester; 17. Love Goes Round and Round; 18. What Makes the Man?; 19. The Dating Obstacle Course; 20. The Midnight Romance Express; 21. Tokyo Love Stories; 22. Opposite Paths; Behind the Scenes extra: Pastel Special Guests
Manami tells Mugi that she likes him, but he hesitates to respond. Yuu gets upset that Mugi is more excited about her old school uniform than her new one. Yuu is popular on her first school day, attracting schoolmate Yuuji Tachibana. When Yuu overhears Mugi mistakenly tell Tachibana that he does not like her, she accepts a date from Tachibana. An errand to buy a plant becomes group bowling followed by okonomiyaki. When Yuu and Tsukasa visit Tokyo, Mugi gets worried and has Kazuki take him there. He sees his ex-girlfriend, Hinako, who still harbors feelings for him.
4	Rumors in the Air	May 14, 2003; 978-4-06-363206-4	September 26, 2006; 978-0345486905
23. The Intersection of Love; 24. A Distant Promise?; 25. A Gift on a Rainy Day; 26. The Shape of Happiness; 27. The Smile of a Fallen Angel; 28. An Invisible Trap; 29. Where Rumours Lead; 30. How to Get Your Man; 31. A Moment of Relaxation; Behind the Scenes extra: At Work on Pastel: The Tale of the Ninja
At Tokyo, Hinako and Yuu meet; they go as a group to the amusement park. Hinako asks Yuu about her living situation and whether she has feelings for Mugi. Yuu adopts a cat. Mugi’s "big sister" friend Sayuri Watase visits. On a group date that Mugi promised Kazuki, they meet Kiku Murakami, an attractive schoolmate who easily manipulates guys. Kiku fails to attract Mugi, who is more interested with dealing with Yuu, so she befriends Yuu while secretly smearing her reputation by spreading pictures of her in questionable situations. When that ploy fails, she invites Mugi to her place to confess to him.
5	Smooch!	July 15, 2003; 978-4-06-363264-4	December 26, 2006; 978-0345493248
32. Only One; 33. The Steps of Love; 34. Riding the Rails; 35. The Dream Tree; 36. A Pleasant Shower; 37. The Perch; 38. Aimless Heart; 39. Happy Birthday to Yuu!; 40. A Young Girl's Worries; Behind the Scenes extra: Pastel Colored Back Pain
Mugi turns down Kiku's confession. Mugi buys Yuu a fashionable hat. At the school festival, Yuu is busy at the maid cafe, while Mugi is busy cooking. After a pro wrestling event, Yuu and Mugi miss the last train out, but find shelter at a small restaurant. The owner, Tetsu Shiba offers Mugi a part-time job. They meet Aoi Sonobe, a young traveling artist who frequents Tetsu’s place. Mugi comes up with a birthday present for Yuu. A sudden weight gain worries Yuu.
6	Sayonara, Yuu!	September 13, 2003; 978-4-06-363288-0	March 27, 2007; 978-0345493255
41. One the Other Side of the Film; 42. Portrait of a Family; 43. Mother and Daughter; 44. Mugi's Decision; 45. Yuu's Heart; 46. All Those Memories; 47. After You're Gone; 48. Like the Day We First Met; 49. The Miracle that is Today; Behind the Scenes extra: A Pastel-Colored Year
Mugi's father visits briefly and shares a bit of Yuu's family history. Then Yuu's mother visits. She tells Mugi that she wants to take her daughters back but to keep it a secret from Yuu, but Mugi tells her anyway, and wonders if that was the right thing to do. Yuu decides to go with her family, leaving both disheartened again. The next summer, Mugi and Kazuki are working at the beach-side inn again, but this time they brought Manami, who confesses to Mugi, but he turns her down. He is surprised to find that Yuu has returned.
7	A New Temptation	February 13, 2004; 978-4-06-363340-5	June 26, 2007; 978-0345493262
50. A New Season; 51. What it is to be a Man; 52. Our First Fight; 53. An Angel's Prank?; Behind the Scenes extra: A Pastel Colored Mouse
Sayuri visits Mugi and Yuu, and encourages Mugi to confess. Mugi and Yuu walk around the area. After seeing Tetsu and Kazuki in action, Mugi tries to become physically stronger, but forgets that he was supposed to take Yuu on a festival date. To get enough money to replace the water heater, Mugi accepts work from Tetsu’s friend at another restaurant, where he meets Hana Hanayama, who turns out to be a schoolmate. Hana starts hanging around with Mugi to the dismay of Yuu. Mugi’s plans to have Christmas alone with Yuu are disrupted when Kazuki arranges a Christmas party at Mugi’s place.
8	Sister to the Rescue	July 15, 2004; 978-4-06-363402-0	September 25, 2007; 978-0345498762
54. Forecast of the Future; 55. Dating Diploma; 56. The Little Demon Comes Home; 57. Saying I Love You
Sayuri has Mugi and Yuu babysit her friend’s child, but Mugi has to work, leaving Yuu to deal with him the entire day. Student council president Megumi Iwai announces that she wants Mugi to go on a date with her before she graduates. Tsukasa returns and learns that Mugi likes Yuu, so she traps Yuu into having to dress up in cosplay outfits, and locking them together in the bath. While wearing a long-haired wig that makes her look like Yuu, Tsukasa has Mugi practice his confession and go on a date.
9	A Special Present	December 15, 2004; 978-4-06-363463-1	January 15, 2008; 978-0345498779
58. The Day of Heroes; 59. Please Love Me; 60. A Single Promise; 61. Turning 18; Behind the Scenes extra: A Pastel-Colored Korean Boom; Bonus drawing An-Age 17.; Notes about Apricot Girl.
Tsukasa’s pranking makes Yuu think of their sibling relationship. Tsukasa wins a trip to a hot springs, and takes Yuu along so she can find out Yuu’s true feelings about Mugi. On Kazuki’s 18th birthday, he confesses to the girl he has loved for a decade: Manami! Sayuri introduces Mugi to her fiancé, Takumi Shijou. For Mugi’s 18th birthday, Kazuki and Tsukasa present a love coupon from Yuu where he can have her do anything he wants. Yuu takes Mugi to Miyajima while Tsukasa, Kazuki, and Manami follow and hope he will get to kiss her.
10	Fool for Love	April 12, 2005; 978-4-06-363511-9	April 22, 2008; 978-0345498786
62. The Best Cheer Ever; 63. Manami's Love Strategy; 64. Osaka Love Quarrel; 65. No Ordinary Day; Bonus panel Hang in There Mugi! I.; Bonus panel Hang in There Mugi! II.; Behind the Scenes extra
Tetsu is stuck traveling, so he has Mugi and Yuu run his restaurant for the day. Manami is concerned that Kazuki has not made any romantic moves on her, so Tsukasa hatches a plan where they all go to the water park. Tsukasa returns to America. Yuu and Mugi visit Osaka, where Yuu meets up with an old friend who is a guy. Mugi’s father introduces a busty young woman, Mako Minamino, as Mugi’s new mother.
11	Mugi Mama	July 15, 2005; 978-4-06-363555-3	July 15, 2008; 978-0345498793
66. Mako-chan the Witch; 67. The Skies of Yesterday and the Unforgettable Promise; 68. Bridging the Gap; Short story: A Bouquet for the Candy Girl.; 12 character design sketches with mini-biographies.
Mako is left to live together with Mugi and Yuu. She challenges Yuu to a series of contests to determine who will sleep with Mugi. She later goes to their school and causes many of the boys to nosebleed for her, especially when she takes over as a swim instructor. As Mugi and the gang return to the beach-side inn, Mugi's friends try different strategies to get Mugi to confess to Yuu.
12	A Summer Confession	November 17, 2005; 978-4-06-363595-9	October 7, 2008; 978-0345498809
69. The Isle of Love?; 70. A Midsummer Miracle; 71. A Wavering Future?; 72. The Other Side of Confession; Short story: Kiku and Mame
Mugi struggles to confess to Yuu, so his friends get the two to enter a couples contest. When Yuu and Mugi win, they are asked to kiss, but Mugi admits they are not really a couple, and for a punishment prize, they have to stay at the uninhabited island nearby. The weather gives them a chance to spend the night together, but when Yuu admits she feels safe around him, Mugi does not push any further. Mugi is surprised by a reunion with Kiku, who makes Yuu jealous as the latter hides from the two as they search for her. Kiku joins the group for a study session, but Mugi’s friends plan a fireworks activity so Mugi can try to confess again.
13	An Old Flame	March 17, 2006; 978-4-06-363640-6	March 24, 2009; 978-0345508287
73. Now's My Chance!; 74. The First Step!; 75. God's Test!?; 76. If You Don't Love Me...; Short story: Apricot Girl; Behind the Scenes extra: A Pastel-Colored Comic Jack
As the summer work comes to an end, Mugi still has not confessed to Yuu, but Kazuki surprises Manami with a kiss! Mugi’s friends arrange for a test of courage. When Yuu is lost, Mugi rushes to find her. After a visit to a temple, Mugi and Yuu return to find Hinako has come for a visit, and they learn a bit about their past relationship, including that they technically have not broken up. Mugi accompanies Hinako around town.
14	No More Excuses	July 14, 2006; 978-4-06-363693-2	September 29, 2009; 978-0345508294
77. A Loss of Warmth?; 78. When Things Spill Over; 79. Getting Through That Lonesome Night; 80. More Than Yesterday, More Than Today!
Mugi offers to fix Momotarou's doghouse but Yuu withdraws from helping when she notices Hinako is participating. After another day out with Hinako, Mugi returns to find that Yuu is staying over at Manami's, but when he goes to get Yuu, Hinako holds him and confesses she still likes him. When she collapses, Mugi stays to take care of her, and they spend another day out. Mugi eventually replies that he likes Yuu and apologizes that he cannot accept her confession. Mugi joins Manami and Yuu to see Hinako off. After barely striking a conversation with Yuu, he ponders what to do, and then musters the courage to confess to her. Yuu avoids answering immediately and does some other activities. Kazuki and Manami check that he confessed properly (i.e. ask her out). On the rock overlooking town, after Mugi asks her out, Yuu responds that she loves him, and slaps him in the face (a promise she made on behalf of Hinako).

==== Volumes 15–42 ====
No.	Release date	ISBN
15	December 15, 2006	978-4-06-363758-8
81. Two people slowly 82. The relation that cannot be told 83. Feelings that embeds gradually 84. Is lying the start of love?
Mugi and Yuu go on their first date as a couple. Their friends celebrate and give them advice on how to appeal to each other. The two try to keep their relationship a secret from the school, but then Yuu gets voted the most popular girl there, while Mugi must deal with runner-up Kiku’s requests. After Yuu catches Mugi in a lie of what he was doing, they agree to be honest with each other, but Mugi gets worried when it looks like Yuu is lying too.
16	April 17, 2007	978-4-06-363817-2
85. An ero-kawa in love?; 86. Steps to a kiss 87. The taste of happiness 88. Love is... sunny, followed by a changeup?
Mugi attends after-school lessons where he meets Urara Haruno, a girl with an ero kawaii (erotic and cute) reputation. Yuu is jealous that Mugi is happy around such a sensual girl that she dresses up in a similar fashion for their date. Mugi and Yuu’s friends and family get the two thinking about kissing. Mugi wants to find an opportunity but keeps getting interrupted. Yuu takes Mugi to a remote shoreline and she eventually kisses him. Later on, the two join in a softball game that puts Tetsu and Aoi on opposite teams with a wager of a kiss on the line.
17	August 17, 2007	978-4-06-363866-0
89. A sketch that began today 90. A dream painted by Yuu-chan; 91. Is it a dream or reality!?; 92. Waking up from the dream, a brand new morning...
When Tetsu announces he is attending an omiai (arranged marriage interview), Aoi declares she will be free of him, but Tetsu has second thoughts and asks her to stay with him forever. At the school festival, Sayuri makes Yuu the co-host on her televised visit. Yuu is scouted to become a Japanese idol. Mugi asks his friends about how he can advance his physical relationship with Yuu, but mistakes Yuu’s actions as wanting the same, at least according to Tsukasa’s video message. Mako acts like an unusually affectionate housewife one day.
18	December 17, 2007	978-4-06-363926-1
93. Growing Feelings; 94. All You Need Is Love!; 95. Beautiful Winding Paths; 96. A Trap For The Young Couple?
Yuu worries that Mugi is having an affair with Moe Haruno, who is Urara’s younger sister. Mugi and Yuu visit Tokyo for Sayuri’s wedding, but discover that it might be called off because Shijou lost the rings. As Mugi and friends ponder careers, Mugi is encouraged to go to college, but tries to have Yuu apply to veterinary schools, which upsets Yuu because it appears he is pushing her away. Yuuji Tachibana asks Yuu out but she declines, but he starts following her and Mugi home and hanging out at their place. After Mugi tells Tachibana that they are going out, Tachibana backs off. Yuu and Mugi ditch school for a day, but they are later called to the principal’s office because he has learned they are living together.
19	May 16, 2008	978-4-06-363984-1
97. Conscious About The Future; 98. Pendulum In The Heart; 99. Capricious 18th 100. Bright Adolescence
Concerned that Yuu and Mugi are living together without parental supervision, the principal does a house visit. Tetsu pretends to be Mugi’s father, but fails. However, Mako is able to convince the principal that she is Mugi’s guardian. She becomes their new homeroom teacher. When Mugi’s father Ken returns, Mako tells Mugi and Yuu that she is in love with Ken. When she tells Ken that she found someone to love, Ken rewards her by signing his half of the marriage certificate. Mugi and Yuu visit the hot springs for Yuu’s 18th birthday, but Mako does not join them to supervise.
20	September 17, 2008	978-4-06-384039-1
101. Be Yourself; 102. Colors of the Heart; 103. First Love; 104. Fully Embracing You
Yuu notices Urara is hanging out a lot with Mugi, but is surprised when Urara and Moe visit, and Urara wants to take a bath with Yuu. A typical school day is presented from the perspective of Mugi and then from the perspective of Yuu. Mugi and Yuu meet up with Yuu’s mother, who is in Tokyo for a school reunion. Mugi and Yuu visit Yuu’s school before she moved, and meet up with old schoolmates. Yuu sees a guy she had a crush on and goes out to meet her, which worries Mugi.
21	January 16, 2009	978-4-06-384084-1
105. Stairs to Adulthood; 106. Chrysanthemum in the Heart; 107. Couples; 108. Flowery Divinations
Mako hosts a pajama party with the girls. Kiku borrows Mugi for the day to be her boyfriend to meet up with her classmates from back in middle school. Mako hosts a swapped couples scavenger hunt, pairing Mugi with Manami, and Yuu with Kazuki. Yuu and Manami meet a fortune teller who recommends that Yuu be more seductive, while Kazuki gives Mugi similar advice to advance his physical relationship.
22	April 17, 2009	978-4-06-384119-0
109. Girls Far and Near; 110. 15 years of Selfishness; 111. Orion Found; 112. Parallel Motives
A girl named Chikako Kitano appears at Mugi’s house, claiming to be his little sister. But she is actually Tooko, a young actress. Yuu gets jealous that she is being so affectionate with Mugi, but when Tooko disappears with a goodbye note, they look for her. Tooko goes on a date with Mugi. Later on, Mugi is stuck hiding in a closet while Yuu and Manami are changing clothes and having intimate conversations. As payback, the girls do the same when Mugi and Kazuki hang out.
23	August 17, 2009	978-4-06-384169-5
113. Tempting Blue Eyes; 114. Feelings of Happiness; 115. The Closest Place to Heaven; 116. Family Portrait
Mugi and Yuu meet Pepper Stacks, Tsukasa’s friend from America. Mugi resists her flirtatious advances, and it is revealed that Tsukasa has returned as well. Pepper takes Mugi to the place in Onomichi where her father had proposed to her mother. After visiting the bathhouse, Pepper has Mugi take her around town to see Japanese culture. She visits their school, but causes some trouble along with Mako. Mugi’s father returns, and agrees to adopt Pepper.
24	December 17, 2009	978-4-06-384222-7
117. Heavenly Kiss!?; 118. To Become Happy...; 119. Surprise On A Special Day!!; Short Story: Happy Ice Cream
Pepper wants to see Mugi and Yuu kiss, so she and Tsukasa set up situations to try to get them to do so, with Mako coming with an even better plan. Pepper’s childhood friend visits and wants to propose to her. Mugi and his father commemorate Mugi’s mother’s death.
25	April 16, 2010	978-4-06-384280-7
120. Mother's Face, a Far Away Summer Day...; 121. Friendly Warmth from Heaven; 122. A Story Starting with a Kiss!?; 123. First Love Is Like a Star; Side Story: Mikan's Heart
Tetsu shares the story of how he knows Mugi’s parents. He and Ken were delinquents who fought each other until Mugi’s mother Yuriko meets them and they fall in love with her. Tetsu later realizes that she loves Ken, so he leaves the area. Mugi tries to act on a rumor that kissing Yuu ten times will result in sex. Kiku brings Mugi a fish, so the girls have a party with Mugi where they talk about their first loves. In the side story, Mikan talks about her life as a cat in the Tadano household; she then has a meeting with the other cats about Mugi and Yuu’s slowly-progressing relationship.
26	September 17, 2010	978-4-06-384361-3
124. Girls in Love; 125. The Reason Mikan Left; 126. The Stairs of Adolescence; 127. Simple Happiness
Kiku and Urara talk about their relationships and become friends. Mikan gets jealous when Yuu brings a kitten home, so she runs off and sees if their friends will adopt her. Tooko asks Mugi’s friends about their first kisses for her next television role. With the school having founder’s day off; Yuu goes with Mugi around town and takes photos.
27	December 17, 2010	978-4-06-384414-6
128. Overlapping Warmth; 129. Stormy Holidays; 130. Dimensional Wars; 131. Hello & Goodbye!?
Yuu shares with Pepper about how she first met Mugi. When Mikan runs off with a mackerel, Mako takes everyone fishing with a contest where the one who cannot catch a fish must perform nyotaimori (body sushi). Kiku is concerned that Moe is an otaku who is only interested in 2D guys, so she gets the gang to see if she likes men. Aoi suspects she might be pregnant, so the gang try to help her get proposed to by Tetsu.
28	April 15, 2011	978-4-06-384472-6
132. Face or Faith!?; 133. The Tiny Love of "Eternity"...; 134. Breakwater of the Heart; 135. The Forefront of Mugi's Fantasies
Manami wonders if she should break up with Kazuki when she notices Kazuki ignored her and forgot her birthday while she gets to know a young doctor. Mugi and Yuu have to take care of Urara’s nine-year-old cousin Sumire, who has a crush on Mugi and considers Yuu her rival. As Mugi’s test scores have been lousy, his friends tell him to stay away from Yuu so he can concentrate, but he continues to be distracted by the girls. Mugi is bothered that he has been picturing Yuu in just a bra whenever he sees her that he tries to find opportunities to touch her chest.
29	July 15, 2011	978-4-06-384518-1
136. Building Up the Memories; 137. Friends Of The "Heart"; 138. Yuu's Hospitality; 139. The God of Yuu
A girl asks Mugi for a date around town before she has to move, and a guy does the same with Yuu, Mugi and Yuu agree in order to keep their relationship a secret. The two students have a good time, but it is revealed they are actually twin siblings and that they figured Mugi and Yuu are dating based on how they acted during the date. When Tsukasa is tricked into getting her hair dyed black and remarks casually that she wants to stay in Japan, Pepper is bothered and challenges Tsukasa in a series of contests. Yuu decides to cook in place of Mugi for a day. Her breakfast and lunch preparations doesn't go that well, so she seeks advice from her friends for dinner. After many attempts, Yuu finally draws "great luck" in the fortune drawing at the temple, but decides to keep it and carry it around with her instead of tying it to a tree, but encounters a series of not so lucky events.
30	November 17, 2011	978-4-06-384578-5
31	March 16, 2012	978-4-06-384641-6
32	July 17, 2012	978-4-06-384703-1
33	November 16, 2012	978-4-06-384766-6
34	March 3, 2013	978-4-06-384828-1
35	July 17, 2013	978-4-06-384892-2
36	November 15, 2013	978-4-06-394963-6
37	April 17, 2014	978-4-06-395026-7
38	October 17, 2014	978-4-06-395216-2
39	March 17, 2015	978-4-06-395290-2
40	August 17, 2015	978-4-06-395465-4
41	December 17, 2015	978-4-06-395568-2
42	April 15, 2016	978-4-06-395655-9
43	October 17, 2016	978-4-06-395786-0
44	February 17, 2017	978-4-06-395864-5

== Reception ==
In Manga: The Complete Guide, Jason Thompson gave the series 1 1/2 out of 4 stars. He wrote: "Pastel is less a story than a supplement to the swimsuit photos that often run in shonen manga magazines. The hero is passive and wimpy, and the girl is an inscrutable abstraction, occasionally sad or peeved, but mostly fawning over Mugi despite the fact that he's accidentally seen her naked umpteen times." He also writes that the "art is slick, with curvy bodies and detailed, photorealistic backgrounds."

== Works cited ==
- "Ch." and "Vol." is shortened form for chapter and volume and refers to a chapter or volume number of the Pastel manga, written by Toshihiko Kobayashi. Original Japanese version published by Kodansha. English version by Del Rey Manga.
