= Magazine Special =

Japanese manga magazine

- Cover of the October 2009 issue
- Categories: Shōnen manga
- Frequency: Monthly
- Circulation: 40,667; (July–September 2016)
- Publisher: Kodansha
- First issue: September 5, 1983
- Final issue: January 20, 2017
- Country: Japan
- Based in: Tokyo
- Language: Japanese

Magazine Special (Japanese: マガジンSPECIAL, Hepburn: Magajin Supesharu) was a Japanese shōnen manga magazine published by Kodansha and first launched with a cover date of September 5, 1983. Its audience demographic was geared toward younger teenage boys, and its contents tended to be predominantly sports stories and high school romantic comedies. Many of the popular series in Magazine Special were transferred there from other Kodansha publications like Weekly Shōnen Magazine after their initial run. It was issued monthly on the 20th in perfect-bound B5 format and retailed for 540 yen. Issues were typically about 600 pages printed in black-and-white on heavy newsprint, with a few glossy pages in color. Between 20 and 30 stories appeared in each issue, almost all of them installments of ongoing and frequently long-running serials by different manga artists.

In August 2016, it was announced that the magazine would cease publication with the February 2017 issue.

== Series ==
Title	Author / Artist	Status
Miami Guns	Takeaki Momose	1997–1999
Z Mazinger	Go Nagai	1998–2000
Kagetora	Akira Segami	2002–2006
Gacha Gacha	Hiroyuki Tamakoshi	2002–2008
Pastel	Toshihiko Kobayashi	2003–2017
Fantastic Detective Labyrinth	Meito Manjō (story), Seiji Wakayama (art)	August 2006 – August 2008
Sumire 16 sai!!	Takeru Nagayoshi	2006–2008
Psycho Busters	Tadashi Agi	2006–2008
Negima!? neo	Takuya Fujima	January 2008 – August 2009
School Rumble Z	Jin Kobayashi	August 2008 – May 2009
Boys Be... Next Season	Masahiro Itabashi (story), Hiroyuki Tamakoshi (art)	November 2009 – March 2012
Tsubasa World Chronicle: Nirai Kanai-hen	Clamp	August 2014 – March 2016
