= Toshihiko Kobayashi =

Japanese manga artist

Toshihiko Kobayashi (小林 俊彦, Kobayashi Toshihiko; born February 25 in Mihara City in Hiroshima) is a Japanese manga artist. In 1995, Half Court was serialized in Magazine Special from No. 1 to No. 11. After the serial publication of Parallel in Magazine Special from No. 8 in 2000 to No. 1 in 2002, Pastel was serialized in Weekly Shonen Magazine from the 32nd issue in 2002 to the 33rd issue in 2003. And now Pastel has been running as a serial ever since Magazine Special No. 10 in 2003.

== Works ==
- Half Court
- Parallel (2000–02)
- Pastel (2002–2017)
- Sailor Fuku, Tokidoki Apron [Schoolgirl Landlord Honoka](2013-2015, 4 volumes)
