= Boys Be... =

Japanese manga series

- First tankōbon volume cover
- Genre: Coming-of-age; Romantic comedy; Slice of life
- Manga
- Written by: Masahiro Itabashi
- Illustrated by: Hiroyuki Tamakoshi
- Published by: Kodansha
- English publisher: NA: Tokyopop (Note: Second series only; expired)
- Imprint: Shōnen Magazine Comics
- Magazine: Weekly Shōnen Magazine
- Original run: August 7, 1991 – March 14, 2001
- Volumes: 58
- Series titles
- 1. Boys Be... (1991–1996; 32 volumes); 2. Boys Be... 2nd Season (1996–2000; 20 volumes); 3. Boys Be... L Co-op (2000–2001; 6 volumes)
Further information
Anime television series
Directed by	Masami Shimoda
Written by	Kenichi Kanemaki
Music by	Be-Factory
Studio	Hal Film Maker
Licensed by	NA: Nozomi Entertainment
Original network	Wowow
English network	NA: Anime Network
Original run	April 11, 2000 – July 4, 2000
Episodes	13
Manga
Boys Be... Last Season
Written by	Masahiro Itabashi
Illustrated by	Hiroyuki Tamakoshi
Published by	Kodansha
Imprint	Shōnen Magazine Comics
Published	June 23, 2001
Volumes	1
Manga
Boys Be... Pre-season
Written by	Masahiro Itabashi
Illustrated by	Hiroyuki Tamakoshi
Published by	Kodansha
Imprint	Shōnen Magazine Comics
Magazine	MiChao!
Original run	April 24, 2009 – October 9, 2009
Volumes	1
Manga
Boys Be... Next Season
Written by	Masahiro Itabashi
Illustrated by	Hiroyuki Tamakoshi
Published by	Kodansha
Imprint	Shōnen Magazine Comics
Magazine	Magazine Special
Original run	October 20, 2009 – February 20, 2012
Volumes	6
Manga
Boys Be… Adult Season
Written by	Masahiro Itabashi
Illustrated by	Hiroyuki Tamakoshi
Published by	Kodansha
Magazine	Evening
Original run	August 11, 2012 – June 25, 2013
Manga
Boys Be... Young Adult
Written by	Masahiro Itabashi
Illustrated by	Hiroyuki Tamakoshi
Published by	Fujimi Shobo
Imprint	Dragon Comics Age
Magazine	Monthly Dragon Age
Original run	September 8, 2017 – July 9, 2018
Volumes	2
- icon

Boys Be... (stylized in all caps) is a Japanese anthology manga series written by Masahiro Itabashi and illustrated by Hiroyuki Tamakoshi. Three different manga series were serialized in Kodansha's shōnen manga magazine Weekly Shōnen Magazine: Boys Be... (1991–1996), Boys Be... 2nd Season (1996–2000), and Boys Be... L Co-op (2000–2001), totaling 58 tankōbon volumes. Four other manga series have been published: Boys Be... Pre-season (2009), Boys Be... Next Season (2009–2012), Boys Be… Adult Season (2012–2013), and Boys Be... Young Adult (2017–2018). In North America, the second manga series was licensed by Tokyopop.

A 13-episode anime television series by Hal Film Maker was broadcast on Wowow in 2000. The anime series was licensed for English release in North America by The Right Stuf International.

== Overview ==
Boys Be... is an anthology series of short romantic comedy stories. The title refers to the quote "Boys, be ambitious", said by William S. Clark, which has become a popular motto in Japan.

The series focuses upon the ups and downs, joys and sorrows of first love and teenage romance. While several characters are taken from stories in the manga series, the story of the anime is unrelated to the manga. Each episode begins and ends with a philosophical quote which sums up the episode's content. The anime, while centered on Kyoichi and Chiharu, revolves around seven or eight main characters and their love lives.

== Characters ==
=== Main characters ===
Kyoichi Kanzaki (神崎 恭一, Kanzaki Kyōichi)
Voiced by: Kenichi Suzumura (Japanese); Sam Regal (English)
A typical high school student who, in the opening episode, realizes he has feelings for a childhood friend, a track star named Chiharu Nitta. Their relationship develops slowly in the series, however, it encounters some turbulence when he goes out of the area to do some summer work, and upon coming back, sees Chiharu kissing another guy. Kyochi is broken hearted and has a brief relationship with Shoko Sayama and dealt with loneliness with the help of another schoolmate. His interests are in the visual arts, mainly drawing. In the final episode, he travels to Hokkaido to clear his mind and work on some sketches, and get a new perspective on relationships.
Yoshihiko Kenjo (剣城 美彦, Kenjō Yoshihiko)
Voiced by: Hideo Ishikawa (Japanese); Patrick Seitz (English)
Yoshihiko is talented in sports (especially baseball), but has no interest in it whatsoever. He also seems to have no interest in girls... until he bumped into Aya Kurihara at the library and kisses her. He meets Natsue Horikawa, who inspires him to keep pursuing baseball and, in getting to know her, and more of himself, they become a couple. He also spent a whole day with pop idol Jyunna Morio when she escaped from her studio taping.
Makoto Kurumizawa (胡桃沢 マコト, Kurumizawa Makoto)
Voiced by: Akira Ishida (Japanese); Liam O'Brien (English)
Makoto is the epitome of a girl-obsessed guy, keeping an electronic database of the good-looking girls at Otowa-no-Mori with him, and checking with his guide books and magazines for love advice. Early in the series, he was trying to peep at a short-skirted schoolgirl as she was climbing the stairs of an overpass, and his scooter crashed into a mini-truck. He then had a crush on the nurse intern. Later on, he used a computer dating program which paired him up with Erika Kawai. Since he lacked real dating experience, Makoto went on a mock date with Yumi. However, his actual date does not go well, when Erika sees a photo of him together with Yumi, and promptly dumps him. Makoto ends up being comforted by Yumi when she offers him her self-made cookies, and he realizes that they had a good time together during the mock date, and they end up becoming a couple.
Chiharu Nitta (新田 千春, Nitta Chiharu)
Voiced by: Kazusa Murai (Japanese); Amy Kincaid (English)
Chiharu is Kyoichi's athletic love interest, running for their school's track and field team. She has been Kyoichi's friend since childhood, but she also has difficulty expressing love, eventually making her move at the end of the first episode by holding Kyoichi's hand while they are out. When she goes out to summer training with the track team, she is wooed by a college guy named Okazaki, and struggles with whether she really has a relationship with Kyoichi. Okazaki continued his advances to which they spent a night together at a lookout point, though she says nothing happened between them. She wanted to keep her tryst a secret, but Kyoichi, coming in to visit, saw them kissing, hence a rift formed between them that lasted all summer. Towards the end of the series, as she sees her friends get into relationships, she considers whether to reconcile.
Yumi Kazama (風間 有美, Kazama Yumi)
Voiced by: Miki Nagasawa (Japanese); Jennifer Sekiguchi (English)
Yumi is a glasses girl with a sarcastic attitude on relationships, usually to counter her friend Aki's idealistic sayings. She likes to occasionally dress in odd clothes, such as a sea otter costume at the beach and an animal hat during New Year's Eve. After accidentally destroying Makoto's laptop, she tries to train Makoto on how to date her friend Erika Kawai, and even goes on a mock date where she holds up X signs and razzes Makoto whenever he makes a mistake. But in the course of the mock date, she realizes she is having a good time, that Makoto has some good qualities, and she ends up falling in love, feeling somewhat lonely that Erika gets to date him for real. However, as fate would have it, Makoto's date with Erika did not go well, and she ends up comforting him with her self-baked cookies, and they ended up being a couple.
Aki Mizutani (水谷 亜紀, Mizutani Aki)
Voiced by: Yuri Shiratori (Japanese); Michelle Ruff (English)
Aki has a rather idealistic view of romance. In the opening episode, she talks about how she fell in love with a guy on the train in two minutes. In one of the episodes, she reunites with her former middle-school classmate that she used to spend a bunch of time with on his photography hobby and who was totally clueless that she liked him. Her boyfriend is now working in Hokkaido, and they maintain a long-distance relationship. In the New Year's Eve episode, she gets worried that the world might really end.

=== Supporting and guest characters ===
Sayaka Kanzaki
Voiced by: Fumiko Orikasa (Japanese); Karen Thompson (English)
She is Kyoichi's smart-alecky sister who loves to tease him. She takes over the Kanzaki household when their parents are not around.
Mizuki Takano
Voiced by: Junko Noda (Japanese); Tara Platt (English)
When Makoto broke his leg due to a scooter accident, he was confined to the hospital where Mizuki was an intern, and she became his nurse. At first, Makoto's crush on her causes trouble as she makes embarrassing mistakes in front of her superiors. Eventually she warms up to him.
Aya Kurihara
Voiced by: Misato Fukuen (Japanese); Rachael Lillis (English)
A female student who had a run-in with Yoshihiko when he looked for a ball that went through the library's window. When he crawled to look for it, he knocked the stool where she was standing while putting a book back into its proper shelf. He caught her and unintentionally got a feel of her "lumpy" side, but she was grateful for the rescue, and rewarded him with a kiss on the lips. The potential romance was cut short when she transferred back to France, as she was just an exchange student, and Yoshihiko learned the kissing is just a European custom, although it turns out Aya has a different view on the romance.
Tsuyoshi Ueno
Voiced by: Yūji Ueda (Japanese); Kevin Hatcher (English)
Tsuyoshi was a classmate of Aki from their third year of junior high. He has a passion for photography, and often spends long hours for the perfect shot, bringing Aki along. But in high school, he lost his passion for photography, until he meets Aki again and she puts some sense into him. They form a long-distance relationship, and he is now working in Hokkaido. His inspiration is none other than Aki herself.
Daisuke Nitta
Voiced by: Yasunori Matsumoto (Japanese); David Earnest (English)
He is Chiharu's cousin and Nao's overprotective brother, and is Kyoichi's and Makoto's boss at the summer resort. He is so overprotective (because of her frail health) that he did not see his beloved sister grow up. Mostly he is in conflict with the fresh Makoto.
Nao Nitta
Voiced by: Chie Sawaguchi (Japanese); Carrie Savage (English)
She is Chiharu's cute but frail cousin (prone to sunstroke) with an overprotective brother who lives by the sea. Makoto tried courting her, but her brother is always a step ahead of him.
Natsue Horikawa
Voiced by: Manabi Mizuno (Japanese); Sonia Scrancia (English)
She dreams of standing at the pitchers' mound during the annual Koushien (Japanese High School Baseball Championship). Trouble is, she is a girl, and girls are not allowed to participate in the tournament. This girl with immature emotional swings did guide Yoshihiko out of his disinterest in the sport, and they become a couple.
Yuki Okazaki
Voiced by: Shinichiro Miki (Japanese); Jason Miller (English)
He is the charming young man Chiharu Nitta met during summer training camp. He is a city slicker with a beat for nature and many hobbies such as collecting beetles and fishing. At first Chiharu shrugged him off, but because she was lonely, and she is in a fight with Kyoichi, she nearly gave in. Though he had a girlfriend waiting in the city, he continued his advances and managed to make Chiharu fall for him, though, during a date at a spot overlooking the city, Chiharu says nothing happened between them.
Shoko Sayama
Voiced by: Yuka Imai (Japanese); Zarah Little (English)
She is a renegade student hoping to make it big in the music business. She and Kyoichi get involved after she recruits him to retrieve her confiscated minidisc player. During the time with Kyoichi, she was planning to audition for lead singer in a J-pop band, but loses confidence when she sees a younger rival. She asks Kyoichi out one night, but he does notcome, and she wanders the street soul searching. At the end of the series, she is on the radio with her latest single called "Hatsukoi" (First Love).
Erika Kawai
Voiced by: Michiko Neya (Japanese); Jennifer Rau-Ramirez (English)
Erika is a good friend of Yumi's and the girl that Makoto's latest matchmaking software selected. Erika comes from a fairly wealthy family and supposedly has refined tastes according to Yumi. Erika and Makoto go on a date, but she notices Makoto has a lot of notes from "training" with Yumi, and that Yumi really does like Makoto, so she quickly dumps him.
Takuya Yokota
Voiced by: Takehito Koyasu (Japanese); Yuri Lowenthal (English)
Takuya is a schoolmate of Kyoichi, and they work together part-time at the video shop. He wears a cross-shaped earring, which Kyoichi notices after he has been hounded by the same dream involving windmills and downed airplanes. Though soft-spoken and one of the most handsome men at his school, Takuya does nothave a girlfriend, though he was interested in someone. He is so shy he drowns in loneliness, but found the courage to express what he feels for that someone. Makoto thought Kyoichi is getting desperate when he notices he was spending too much time with him.
Jyunna Morio
Voiced by: Rika Komatsu (Japanese); Wendee Lee (English)
She is a famous pop idol. Her image is plastered on everything from TV commercials selling bottled water to magazine covers. Yoshihiko mistakes her for a generic girl in a Santa suit distributing flyers. For the rest of the day, Yoshihiko became her unwitting "reindeer" . Earlier in the series, Yoshihiko and his girlfriend Natsue went to one of her concerts.
Chiharu Reicha / Biker Girl
Voiced by: Megumi Hayashibara (Japanese); Kirsten Potter (English)
She is a Japanese-Finnish girl that Kyoichi met when he travel to Hokkaido, acting as his impromptu tourist guide that "charge one kiss per transaction." She is more flirtatious, more daring, and freer than the Chiharu he knows, and rides a Harley-Davidson Softail motorcycle.

== Media ==
=== Manga ===
Written by Masahiro Itabashi and illustrated by Hiroyuki Tamakoshi, Boys Be... was serialized in Kodansha's shōnen manga magazine Weekly Shōnen Magazine from August 7, 1991, to November 13, 1996. Kodansha collected its chapters in 32 tankōbon volumes, released from January 17, 1992, to January 17, 1997.

A second series, titled Boys Be... 2nd Season, was published in the same magazine from November 20, 1996, to February 23, 2000. (Note: The series finished in the magazine's 13th issue of 2000 (cover date March 8), released on February 23, 2000.) Kodansha collected its chapters in 20 volumes, released from April 17, 1997, to July 17, 2000.

A third series, Boys Be... L Co-op, was published in the same magazine from March 21, 2000, (Note: The series started in the magazine's 17th issue of 2000 (cover date April 5), released on March 21 of the same year.) to March 14, 2001. Kodansha collected its chapters in six volumes, released from August 10, 2000, to June 15, 2001. An additional volume, titled Boys Be... Last Season, was released on June 23, 2001.

In North America, the second part of the manga, Boys Be... 2nd Season, was released by Tokyopop; according to Tokyopop's Jake Forbes, the publisher licensed the second series due to its "more contemporary, mature, and compelling" subject matter. They released 17 volumes from November 9, 2004, to August 13, 2008, before Tokyopop confirmed in August 2009 that their manga licensing contracts with Kodansha had expired.

==== Other series ====
A special one-shot was published in Magazine Special on March 19, 2009. Boys Be... Pre-season (firstly published as Boys Be… 2009 1-Gakki (BOYS BE… 2009年1学期)) was serialized on Kodansha's MiChao! manga website from April 24 to October 9 of the same year. It was collected in a single volume released on January 15, 2010.

Boys Be... Next Season was serialized in Kodansha's Magazine Special from October 20, 2009, to February 20, 2012. Six volumes were released from April 16, 2010, to April 17, 2012.

Boys Be… Adult Season started in Kodansha's seinen manga magazine Evening on August 11, 2012. Its latest chapter was published on June 25, 2013.

Boys Be... Young Adult' was serialized in Fujimi Shobo's Monthly Dragon Age from September 8, 2017, to July 9, 2018. Two volumes were released on April 9 and October 9, 2018.

=== Anime ===
A 13-episode anime television series produced by Hal Film Maker was broadcast on Wowow from April 11 to July 4, 2000. The opening and ending themes, "Daijobu" (だいじょうぶ) and "Minna Ga Iine" (みんながいいね), respectively, are both performed by Aki Maeda. The ending theme for episode 8 is "My Tomorrow" by Yuka Imai; she also performed the opening theme for the final episode, "Hatsukoi" (初恋; lit. "First Love"), which is a cover of Kozo Murashita's 1983 song.

The series was licensed in Southeast Asia by Odex, who released the series in Japanese with English subtitles in 2001. In North America, the series was licensed by The Right Stuf International in 2004. It was released on four DVDs from February 28 to June 27, 2006. A complete DVD set was released under Right Stuf's division Nozomi Entertainment on March 11, 2008. A DVD box set was released on December 7, 2010.

=== Drama ===
A television drama series adaptation, titled Boys Be… Jr., aired on Nippon Television from October 4 to December 27, 1998. It was a crown program for the Junior artists of Johnny & Associates, being Jun Matsumoto, Masaki Aiba and Tomohisa Yamashita some of the protagonists. It consisted of 12 episodes and one special.

=== Video games ===
Two video games for the PlayStation were released by Kodansha: Boys Be... on March 28, 1997, and Boys Be.. 2nd Season on September 22, 1999. Another video game, Typing Renai Hakusho: Boys Be... (タイピング恋愛白書 BOYS BE…, Taipingu Renai Hakusho Bōizu Bī…), was released by Sunsoft for the PlayStation 2 on March 14, 2002.

== Reception ==
=== Manga ===
By 2022, the manga had over 25 million copies in circulation.

Reviewing Tokyopop's first volume for Anime Fringe, Patrick King commended the realism and depth of the characters and Hiroyuki's art style as well, stating: "Boys Be is a refreshing series that was written for guys seeking a little romance manga of their own. In that regard, it is easily worth a look if you're one such guy", noting, however, that the stories could appeal to female readers as well. In Manga: The Complete Guide, Jason Thompson commented: "Most of the stories involve kisses or love confessions, or are excuses for women to pose in scanty outfits, but the hero does not always get the girl, and a few of the stories are impressively funny." Thompson also said that the art "improves as it goes on," adding, however, that "the repetitive character designs make it difficult to tell one girl from the others." In a more negative review, Johanna Draper Carlson of Comics Worth Reading criticized the series for its repetitiveness, formulaic stories and fanservice, stating as well that the female characters, except for hair length, look alike.

=== Anime ===
Writing for Anime News Network, Patrick King commented that the series is "frequently tender, but never mushy. Its female stars are attractive, but they're not pin-ups, nor do they jiggle without reason. Romance and humor are deftly intertwined in this series, but it is not a standard romantic comedy," adding that the series "depicts the "normal" world quite well, but this show is far from average." Theron Martin from the same website, said that it is "hardly a dynamic series, and doesn't have much for ongoing plot," but highlighted the "honest, character-driven stories which feel real and avoid going to silly or angsty extremes". Martin said that the series' called the series "unsuitable for anyone who doesn't have a fair amount of patience, but those that do will find a pleasant and likable slice-of-life series free of the normal anime gimmicks." Chris Beveridge of AnimeOnDVD, made a positive review of the series, stating that it "consistently brought a smile to our face throughout it. Remembrances of experiences past and the ring of real world truth to much of it makes this something that people can connect to in a way they can't with a lot of other anime."

Enoch Lau of THEM Anime Reviews praised the stories and characters, stating that while they are "slightly stereotyped", they have a "down-to-earth appeal to the viewer." Lau also commended the soundtrack and varied range of music. On the other hand, he criticized the art, stating that it is "rather inconsistent when it comes to character design and sometimes gets a bit too simple," and its short duration. In a more mixed review, Jeff Harris of IGN stated that the series' relationship drama is at times "seriously overdone and rather sappy," and that it "disappoints more often than not." Harris concluded: "Boys Be is a pretty harmless but overall, a rather tame and vanilla romance anime. The show leaves way too much unsaid, and it feels like barely any progression is made in the story."
