= Takeru Nagayoshi =

Japanese manga artist

- Born: October 21, 1978; Fukuoka Prefecture, Japan
- Occupation: Manga artist

Takeru Nagayoshi (永吉 たける, Nagayoshi Takeru; born on October 21, 1978, in Fukuoka Prefecture, Japan) is a Japanese manga artist. He is notable as the author of the Sumire 16 sai!! series. He debuted on Weekly Shōnen Magazine in 2006 with the manga series Sumire 17 sai!!, then later moved to Magazine Special continuing the series but renaming to Sumire 16 sai!!.

== Works ==
- Sumire 17 sai!! (2006)
- Sumire 16 sai!! (2006–2008)
- Imasugu Click! (2008–2014)
- Roboken Hachi no Ie (2012)
- Densha on Ohimesama.
- Jigoku Okotowari.
- Detective Nekoashi
- Ozanari Sumire.
- Roboinu Hachi.
