= Sumire 16 sai!! =

Japanese manga series

- First tankōbon volume cover

スミレ16歳!!
- Genre: Comedy
- Manga

Sumire 17 sai!!
- Written by: Takeru Nagayoshi
- Published by: Kodansha
- Imprint: Shōnen Magazine Comics
- Magazine: Weekly Shōnen Magazine; Magazine Special
- Original run: March 23, 2005 – March 20, 2006
- Volumes: 2
- Manga
- Written by: Takeru Nagayoshi
- Published by: Kodansha
- Imprint: Shōnen Magazine Comics
- Magazine: Weekly Shōnen Magazine (2006–07); Magazine Special (2007–09)
- Original run: May 10, 2006 – January 20, 2009
- Volumes: 5
- Television drama
- Original network: BS Fuji
- Original run: April 14, 2008 – June 30, 2008
- Episodes: 12
- icon

Sumire 16 sai!! (スミレ16歳!!; lit. '16-year-old Sumire!!') is a Japanese manga series written and illustrated by Takeru Nagayoshi. A two-volume first manga series, titled Sumire 17 sai!!, was serialized in Kodansha's shōnen manga magazines Weekly Shōnen Magazine and Magazine Special from March 2005 to March 2006. Nagayoshi decided to reset the story's timeframe one year earlier and rewrite the story from scratch. Sumire 16 sai!! was serialized in the same magazines from May 2006 to January 2009, with its chapters collected in five tankōbon volumes. A 12-episode television drama adaptation was broadcast on BS Fuji from April to June 2008.

== Synopsis ==
The series chronicles the days of Sumire, a lively 16-year-old girl. However, Sumire is not a common girl: she is a life-sized ventriloquist's dummy, controlled by an old man in black clothes. Sumire's character acts unaware of her puppet nature, or of the old man controlling her movements, although the rest of the cast are very aware that she is a puppet, but they become more or less accustomed to her weird nature.

== Characters ==
Sumire Yotsuya (四谷スミレ, Yotsuya Sumire)
Portrayed by: Nako Mizusawa
A full-sized puppet, resembling a mannequin, designed to look like a 16-year-old girl, with enough points of articulation to assume almost any pose. The puppet has a hole in her back where the puppeteer places his hand to control facial features. Beyond being a puppet, the character that is played through Sumire is that of a supposedly normal schoolgirl. Her character refuses to acknowledge the puppeteer, even when directly asked. She has trouble making friends due to her situation, but her strong will wins over many people. She was originally a smaller puppet that also attended grade school years beforehand. After years pass and she finally attends the next year of education, she seemingly forgets classmates from years ago. The Old Man reacts instead by crying in happiness upon encountering old classmates years later. At times, her appearance becomes softer and fewer indications that she is a puppet are visible. In the manga, this is evidenced by fewer joints being drawn; while in the TV drama, her mannequin form is replaced with her actress.
Old Man (おやじ, Oyaji)
Portrayed by: Takuma Otoo
Sumire's puppeteer. An unnamed middle-aged man wearing black clothes, similar to those worn by puppeteers who perform against black screens to remain hidden from the audience. The puppeteer is often attacked by those unfamiliar with Sumire, however the effects of these attacks are ignored by Sumire's character, who dismisses them as close calls. Everyone acknowledges the existence of the old man except for Sumire and, seemingly, the school principal. Teachers at the school have learned to ignore him or risk being fired by the principal for badmouthing a student. In the manga, the old man does not speak for himself, exclusively using ventriloquism to make Sumire speak. The TV drama shows the old man speaking in unison with Sumire on occasion.

== Media ==
=== Manga ===
Written and illustrated by Takeru Nagayoshi, the first manga series, titled Sumire 17 sai!! (スミレ 17歳!!), was serialized in Kodansha's shōnen manga magazine Weekly Shōnen Magazine and Magazine Special from March 23, 2005, to March 20, 2006. (Note: It was serialized in Weekly Shōnen Magazine from the 17th issue of 2005 (released on March 23) to the ninth issue of 2006 (released on February 1); it was serialized in Magazine Special from the seventh issue of 2005 (released on June 20) to the fourth issue of 2006 (released on March 20).) Kodansha collected its chapters in two tankōbon volumes, released on February 16 and June 16, 2006.

Nagayoshi decided to reset the story's timeframe one year earlier and rewrite the story from scratch. Sumire 16 sai!! was serialized in Weekly Shōnen Magazine and Magazine Special from May 10, 2006, to January 20, 2009. (Note: It was serialized in Weekly Shōnen Magazine from the 23rd issue of 2006 (released on May 10) to the 19th issue of 2007 (released on April 11); it was serialized in Magazine Special special from the first issue of 2007 (released on December 20, 2006) to the second issue of 2009 (released on January 20).) Kodansha collected its chapters in five tankōbon volumes, released from September 15, 2006, to February 17, 2009.

=== Drama ===
A 12-episode television drama adaptation was broadcast on BS Fuji from April 13 to June 29, 2008. (Note: BS Fuji listed the air dates for the series on Sunday at 24:00, which is effectively Monday at 0:00 a.m. JST.) The series' theme song is "Ceramic Girl" (セラミックガール, Seramikku Gāru) by Perfume.
