= Kagetora =

Japanese manga series

- First tankōbon volume cover, featuring Kagetora Kazama (back) and Yuki Toudou (front)
- Genre: Martial arts; Romantic comedy
- Manga
- Written by: Akira Segami
- Published by: Kodansha
- English publisher: NA: Del Rey
- Magazine: Magazine Special
- Original run: June 20, 2002 – September 20, 2006
- Volumes: 11
- icon

Kagetora (stylized in all caps) is a Japanese manga series written and illustrated by Akira Segami. It was serialized in Kodansha's shōnen manga magazine Magazine Special from June 2002 to September 2006, with its chapters collected in eleven tankōbon volumes. In North America, the manga was licensed for English release by Del Rey.

== Plot ==
Kagetora is a modern-day ninja tasked with instructing Yuki, the heiress of a prominent martial arts family, in self-defense and combat techniques. Bound by professional ethics that forbid romantic involvement with his charge, Kagetora experiences internal conflict as he develops feelings for Yuki. The central plot explores his struggle between maintaining professional duty and acknowledging his emotional attachment. As Yuki reciprocates these sentiments, the situation becomes increasingly complex due to the prohibitions governing their relationship. They navigate these conflicting obligations and emotions within their constrained circumstances.

== Characters ==
Kagetora Kazama (風間 影虎, Kazama Kagetora)
Kagetora is a young ninja tasked as Yuki's protector, toward whom he gradually develops romantic feelings. Initially reluctant to acknowledge these emotions, he eventually embraces them. He owns a pet monkey and has two older brothers who frequently tease him. Though somewhat indulged by his mother in his youth, she also instilled in him resilience. He often struggles with self-restraint, displaying impulsive tendencies.
Yuki Toudou (藤堂 由姫, Tōdō Yuki)
Yuki is the heir to the Toudou family and trains in self-defense and combat. She develops romantic feelings for Kagetora, expressing them through subtle actions. Polite and slightly clumsy, she displays greater martial skill when intoxicated, which Kagetora notices. Her petite stature contrasts with her combat capabilities.
Akino Kiritani (桐谷 秋乃, Kiritani Akino)
Kiritani serves as Yuki's former mentor and frequently clashes with Kagetora. A physically strong and highly skilled combatant, she trains under Saya Toudou, Yuki's mother. She remains fiercely protective of Yuki, treating her like a younger sister. Initially opposed to Kagetora's role as Yuki's protector, she eventually develops a relationship with Kujou, Kagetora's disciple.
Sakuya (朔夜)
A skilled ninja and Kagetora's childhood friend, proficient in various ninjutsu techniques. She harbors long-standing romantic feelings for him and actively pursues his affection. Despite Kagetora's obliviousness, she maintains a sisterly bond with Yuki. Her persistence in both combat and personal matters defines her character.
Issei Kujou (九条 一成, Kujō Issei)
Kagetora's determined but physically weak disciple. His imposing stature often creates a false impression of strength, though he lacks martial arts ability. Initially infatuated with Yuki, he later develops a deeper romantic attachment to Aki, with whom he eventually begins a relationship. His perseverance contrasts with his actual combat limitations.
Nao Takatou (高遠 七緒, Takatō Nao)
A classmate of Yuki and Kagetora who serves as captain of the school archery club. She recruits Kagetora as a substitute for an upcoming competition, and during their training sessions, she begins developing romantic feelings for him. Her disciplined nature as an athlete contrasts with this emerging emotional vulnerability.
Kosuke (小助)
Kagetora's pet monkey, Kosuke, serves as his ninja companion. The two formed a bond through their shared experience of losing their mothers. Kosuke communicates by holding up written signs, allowing Kagetora to understand his thoughts and opinions. Their mutual understanding led to their partnership.
Nachi (那智)
Nachi is Shiroumaru's wolf companion, frequently left at Kagetora's residence due to Shiroumaru's forgetfulness. The offspring of Shigure and Hayate, Nachi maintains the lineage of working wolves within the ninja clan.
Saya Toudou (藤堂 沙耶, Tōdō Saya)
Saya Toudou is Yuki's mother, a highly skilled martial artist who serves as Aki's kendo instructor. Known for her wisdom and relaxed demeanor, she maintains an authoritative yet approachable presence.
Tomoe Toudou (藤堂 巴, Tōdō Tomoe)
Assistant instructor of the Toudou style jujitsu and Yuki's cousin. She is three years older than Yuki, and is also a skilled martial artist as seen when she sparred with Kagetora.
Kureha Kazama (風間 呉葉, Kazama Kureha)
A ninja who married Tenshuu and bore three sons: Kagetora, Shiroumaru, and Taka. Due to her physical frailty, she was unable to fulfill her ninja duties. She died during Kagetora's childhood.
Tenshū Kazama (風間 天鷲, Kazama Tenshū)
Tenshuu is the father of Kagetora, Taka, and Shiroumaru. A highly skilled yet stern ninja, he frequently embarks on missions, resulting in prolonged absences from his family. After years apart, he reunites with Kagetora and meets Yuki.
Taka Kazama (風間 鷹王, Kazama Takaō)
The second eldest of the Kazama brothers, known for his polite demeanor toward others while frequently teasing Kagetora. He instilled Kagetora's fear of ghosts and enforces strict discipline, making Kagetora wary of him. Taka owns a pet eagle named Kagura and bears a resemblance to his mother.
Shiroumaru Kazama (風間 志狼丸, Kazama Shirōmaru)
The eldest of the Kazama brothers and shares a close bond with Kagetora, who holds deep respect for him. Known for his bold nature, he demonstrates keen insight into Taka's character. His physical appearance strongly resembles their father, Tenshuu.
Kaya (榧)
A kunoichi who declares herself Yuki's new protector. While highly proficient in ninja techniques, she demonstrates limited familiarity with formal martial arts disciplines.
Satsuki Reizenn (冷泉院 皐月, Reizen'in Satsuki)
She transfers to Kagetora's school after attending the elite Fuyoh Girls Academy. She develops an immediate infatuation with Kagetora upon their first meeting. Hailing from a wealthy background, she actively pursues him with persistent, overbearing tactics while exhibiting an aristocratic demeanor characteristic of privileged upbringing.
Keith Wayland (キース・ウェイランド, Kīsu Ueirando)
A foreign martial artist fascinated by samurai culture challenges Kagetora for the position of Yuki's protector and admission to the dojo. Though ultimately defeated, he earns acceptance before departing to further hone his skills through combat experience abroad.
Takemi Toudou (藤堂 武弥, Tōdō Takemi)
Yuki's father, an archaeologist and Saya's husband, frequently travels abroad for research, limiting his involvement in her upbringing. He often brings home artifacts from his expeditions, though his attempts to share his discoveries are frequently met with disapproval—particularly when they involve insects, which Yuki dislikes.

== Publication ==
Written and illustrated by Akira Segami, Kagetora was first published as a one-shot chapter in Kodansha's shōnen manga magazine Magazine Special on December 4, 2001, and was later serialized in the same magazine from June 20, 2002, to September 20, 2006. (Note: The series finished in the magazine's tenth issue of 2006, released on September 20 of that same year.) Kodansha collected its chapters in eleven tankōbon volumes, released from February 17, 2003, to October 17, 2006.

In North America, the series was licensed for English release by Del Rey, which published its eleven volumes under its Del Rey Manga imprint from March 28, 2006, to September 30, 2008.

=== Volumes ===
No.	Title	Original release date	English release date
1	Mission Impossible	February 17, 2003; 978-4-06-363210-1	March 28, 2006; 978-0-345-49141-1
Chapter 1: "Inappropriate Instructor"; Chapter 2: "Enemies in Love"; Chapter 3: "Summertime Attraction"; Chapter 4: "Peach-Colored Hime"; Chapter 5: "A Wolf is Coming"
2	A Ninja in Love	June 17, 2003; 978-4-06-363257-6	June 27, 2006; 978-0-345-49142-8
Chapter 6: "There's No Such Thing as Ghosts"; Chapter 7: "I'm Not a Kid Anymore"; Chapter 8: "Christmas Virgin"; Chapter 9: "A Secret Just Between Us"; Chapter 10: "Meanie"
3	Forbidden Love	November 17, 2003; 978-4-06-363312-2	September 26, 2006; 978-0-345-49143-5
Chapter 11: "Useless"; Chapter 12: "Target: Kagetora"; Chapter 13: "Lady Tutors"; Chapter 14: "The Great Escape"; Chapter 15: "Dangerous Sumival"
4	Family Affairs	April 16, 2004; 978-4-06-363365-8	December 26, 2006; 978-0-345-49144-2
Chapter 16: "Swimsuit Competition"; Chapter 17: "Scary Person"; Chapter 18: "Weak Kagetora"; Chapter 19: "Reason for Smiling"; Chapter 20: "New Year's Wish"
5	Sacred Duty	August 17, 2004; 978-4-06-363417-4	March 27, 2007; 978-0-345-49145-9
Chapter 21: "Rival Wolf"; Chapter 22: "Cool Guy"; Chapter 23: "From Kyoto with Love"; Chapter 24: "Butterfly Memories"; Chapter 25: "The Person I Love the Most"
6	A Love That Cannot Be	January 17, 2005; 978-4-06-363466-2	June 26, 2007; 978-0-345-49146-6
Chapter 26: "Kagetora and Aki on a Date?"; Chapter 27: "How to Spend a Hot Summer Day"; Chapter 28: "Rainy Kamakura"; Chapter 29: "Kamakura After the Rain"; Chapter 30: "Prelude to a Love Triangle"
7	Three's a Crowd	June 17, 2005; 978-4-06-363542-3	September 25, 2007; 978-0-345-49616-4
Chapter 31: "A Secret Night"; Chapter 32: "Restless Yuki"; Chapter 33: "Confession"; Chapter 34: "A Face Yuki Doesn't Know"; Side Story: "Kagetora Edo Version"
8	Brotherly Love?	September 16, 2005; 978-4-06-363574-4	December 26, 2007; 978-0-345-49617-1
Chapter 35: "Yuki vs. Taka; Chapter 36: "Tiger and Hawk; Chapter 37: "The Secret of Yuki's Body"; Special Chapter 1: "Winter Training Is a Dangerous Thing"; Special Chapter 2: "Yuki on a Date"; Special Chapter 3: "Beyond the Hot Spring's Steam"; Special Chapter 4: "Sweet Talk"
9	Three's Not the Charm!	February 16, 2006; 978-4-06-363630-7	March 25, 2008; 978-0-345-49771-0
Chapter 38: "Aim for the Ninja!"; Chapter 39: "Want to Protect"; Chapter 40: "Secret Crush"; Chapter 41: "Stolen Love"; Chapter 42: "A Fist and Tears"
10	Love, Ninja Style!	August 17, 2006; 978-4-06-363708-3	July 8, 2008; 978-0-345-49897-7
Chapter 43: "Report to Mother"; Chapter 44: "I Love You!"; Chapter 45: "First Date"; Chapter 46: "Another Person"; Chapter 47: "A Good Oyakume"; Chapter 0.5: "Meeting"
11	Over Too Soon?	October 17, 2006; 978-4-06-363735-9	September 30, 2008; 978-0-345-49898-4
Chapter 48: "One Night Only"; Chapter 49: "This Is an Order"; Chapter 50: "Together Forever"; Chapter 0: "Kagetora Beta Version"

== Reception ==
Carlos Santos of Anime News Network rated the first volume C. Santos compared the series to Flame of Recca, but "branching out into comedy instead of adventure". He praised its humorous culture-clash premise and Segami's dynamic action artwork, but criticized its overreliance on "uninspired romantic-comedy filler." While acknowledging its light, familiar charm, Santos found the humor and fanservice overly formulaic.
