= Hiroyuki Tamakoshi =

Japanese manga artist (born 1970)

Hiroyuki Tamakoshi 玉越 博幸
- Born: September 1, 1970 (age 56) Osaka Prefecture
- Area: Manga artist
- Notable works: Boys Be...

Hiroyuki Tamakoshi (玉越 博幸, Tamakoshi Hiroyuki) is a Japanese manga artist born in 1970. His manga are mostly his comedic take of an ecchi boy's harem romance themes. Most of his work has appeared in Weekly Shōnen Magazine, with Boys Be.and Gacha Gacha his best-known titles.

On September 14, 2022, Tamakoshi announced he had been diagnosed with stage 3 cancer and is undergoing four months of chemotherapy. On December 5, 2023, Tamakoshi announced he would be taking a break from manga.

== Works ==
- Boys Be... (1991–2018) (story by Masahiro Itabashi)
- Gacha Gacha (2002–2007)
- A-Girls (2003)
- Gomen ne, Maria-sama (2006)
- Do suru!? Paradise (2006)
- Que Sera Sera (2007)
- Makyou no Shanana (2009) (story by Hiroshi Yamamoto)
- Jhey Live!! (じぇいりぶ!!, Jeiribu!!) (2012, Comic Birz, 3 volumes)
- Mobile Suit Gundam 0080: War in the Pocket (2021)
