= Aizawa =

Aizawa (相沢 "fellow swamp") is a Japanese surname. Alternate writings include 相澤 ("fellow swamp"), 藍澤 ("indigo swamp") and 藍沢 ("indigo swamp"). Notable people with the surname include:

- Chiyo Aizawa (相沢 チヨ, born 1932), Japanese woman who killed her father
- Haruka Aizawa (あいざわ 遥, born 1970), Japanese manga artist
- Hiroyasu Aizawa (会沢 仁康, born 1961), retired Japanese ski jumper
- Hitomi Aizawa (相澤 仁美, born 1982), Japanese gravure idol and race queen
- Keiko Aizawa (相沢 恵子, born 1963), Japanese voice actress
- Kiyoharu Aizawa (相澤 消晴, born 1959), Japanese engineer
- Machiko Aizawa (相沢 マチ子, born 1949), Japanese badminton player
- Mai Aizawa (相沢 舞), Japanese voice actress and singer
- Mai Aizawa (footballer) (相澤 舞衣, born 1980), Japanese women's footballer
- Rina Aizawa (逢沢 りな, born 1991), Japanese actress and gravure idol
- Saburo Aizawa (相沢 三郎, 1889–1936), Japanese soldier who assassinated Tetsuzan Nagata
- Sayo Aizawa (相沢 紗世, born 1978), Japanese model and television personality
- Shiloh Aizawa (愛澤 伯友, born 1962), Japanese composer, creator
- Tsubasa Aizawa (會澤 翼, born 1988), Japanese baseball player
- Yasushi Aizawa (会沢 安, 1781–1863), Japanese scholar, author of the New Theses, promoter of Japanese national essentialism

== Fictional characters ==
- Akane Aizawa (相沢 あかね), a character in Dai Sentai Goggle V
- Ayumu Aizawa (逢沢 歩), a character in the anime series Absolute Boy
- Chitose Aizawa, a character in the 3rd game of the dating sim series Tokimeki Memorial
- Chizuru Aizawa (相澤 千鶴), a character in the manga series Ai Yori Aoshi
- Gorou Aizawa (相沢 五郎), a character in the manga series Tomo-chan Is a Girl!
- Itsuki Aizawa, a character in the manga series Warriors of Tao
- Kakeru Aizawa (逢沢 駆), a character in the manga series The Knight in the Area
- Kanae Aizawa (相沢 香苗), a character in the manga series G-Taste
- Keiichiro Aizawa (相沢 圭一郎), a character in the manga series Wangan Midnight
- Kenji Aizawa, a character in the film Tokyo Drifter
- Koichi Aizawa (相澤 虹一), a character in the manga series Nabari no Ou
- Kyo Aizawa (相沢 香), a character in the manga Girl Got Game
- Miki Aizawa, a character in the film Jushin Thunder Liger: Fist of Thunder
- Mint Aizawa (藍沢 みんと), a character in the manga series Tokyo Mew Mew
- Miyabi Aizawa (相沢 雅), a character in the manga series Great Teacher Onizuka
- Orie Aizawa, a character in the manga series Epotoransu! Mai
- Professor Aizawa (相澤), a character in the light novel series Suki na Mono wa Suki Dakara Shōganai!
- Risona Aizawa (藍沢 理想奈), a character in the manga series Mahoraba
- Ryota Aizawa (相澤 涼太), a character in the visual novel Soul Link
- Sho Aizawa (相沢 翔), a character in the manga series Figure 17
- Shouta Aizawa (相澤 消太), a character in the manga series My Hero Academia
- Shuichi Aizawa (相沢 周市), a character in the manga series Death Note
- Taki Aizawa (相沢 多喜), a character in the manga series Gravitation
- Tomo Aizawa (相沢 智), a character in the manga series Tomo-chan Is a Girl!
- Tomomi Aizawa (愛沢 ともみ), a character in the dating sim Welcome to Pia Carrot
- Yuichi Aizawa (相沢 祐一), a character in the visual novel Kanon
- Yuri Aizawa, a character in the J-drama Pride
