= Liger (disambiguation) =

A liger is a crossbreed between a lion and a tiger.

Liger may also refer:

== Animals ==
- Liger, a spider genus in Linyphiidae

== Arts and entertainment ==
- Liger (film), 2022
- Several fictional Zoids mecha (since 1983):
  - Blade Liger
  - Liger Zero
  - Energy Liger
  - Shield Liger
- Jushin Liger (TV series), an anime which ran 1989–1990
- Jushin Thunder Liger: Fist of Thunder, a film also about the wrestler

== Places in France ==
- Loire, a major river (Breton/Latin: Liger)
- A Bresle tributary

== People ==
- Jushin Liger (born 1964), Japanese wrestler
- Liger, a supervillain wrestling character of Michel Mulipola (born 1981)
- Chris Jericho (born 1970), Canadian wrestler (ring name: Super Liger)
