= Basilisk: The Ouka Ninja Scrolls =

Japanese novel series and its anime adaptation

- First novel cover

桜花忍法帖～バジリスク新章 (Ōka Ninpō Chō Bajirisuku Shinfumi)
- Created by: Masaki Segawa
- Serial novel
- Written by: Masaki Yamada
- Illustrated by: Masaki Segawa
- Published by: Kodansha
- Imprint: Kodansha Taiga
- Original run: November 19, 2015 – December 15, 2015
- Volumes: 2
- Manga
- Written by: Tatsuya Shihira
- Published by: Kodansha
- Magazine: Weekly Young Magazine
- Original run: July 24, 2017 – April 8, 2019
- Volumes: 7
- Anime television series
- Directed by: Junji Nishimura
- Produced by: Isao Hidaka; Renta Suzuki; Natsuko Tatsuzawa; Hiroshi Shibusawa
- Written by: Shinsuke Ōnishi
- Music by: Go Sakabe
- Studio: Seven Arcs Pictures
- Licensed by: Crunchyroll: SA/SEA: Medialink
- Original network: Tokyo MX, tvk, Sun TV, KBS Kyoto, BS11, AT-X
- Original run: January 9, 2018 – June 19, 2018
- Episodes: 24
- icon

Basilisk: The Ouka Ninja Scrolls (Japanese: 桜花忍法帖～バジリスク新章, Hepburn: Ōka Ninpō Chō Bajirisuku Shinfumi; "The Ouka Ninja Scrolls: Basilisk New Chapter") is a Japanese novel written by Masaki Yamada, with illustrations by Masaki Segawa. It is a sequel to Segawa's manga series Basilisk, itself adapted from Futaro Yamada's novel The Kouga Ninja Scrolls. It was published by Kodansha in two volumes in November and December 2015. A manga adaptation by Tatsuya Shihira was serialized in Kodansha's seinen manga magazine Weekly Young Magazine from July 2017 to April 2019, with its chapters collected in seven tankōbon volumes. A 24-episode anime television series adaptation by Seven Arcs Pictures was broadcast from January to June 2018.

== Plot ==
Set a decade after the war between the rival Iga and Koga ninja clans, a conflict that ended with the deaths of many clan members and the tragic separation of two lovers from opposing sides. In the peaceful Kan'ei era that follows, the two clans live together in a hidden village, their rivalry officially ended, but tensions still linger. To preserve their bloodlines and strengthen their future, the clans arrange a union between their young leaders, Hachiro of Koga and Hibiki of Iga.

Hachiro and Hibiki both inherit powerful eye techniques from their parents, and it is believed that if the two unite, a mysterious power will be awakened. As they train and prepare for their future together, political forces connected to the Tokugawa shogunate begin to take interest in the clans once again, and hidden conflicts threaten the fragile peace.

== Media ==
=== Novel ===
Written by Masaki Yamada, with illustrations by Basilisk's manga author Masaki Segawa, the two-part novel was published by Kodansha on November 19 and December 17, 2015.

=== Manga ===
A manga series adaptation by Tatsuya Shihira was serialized in Kodansha's Weekly Young Magazine from July 24, 2017, to April 8, 2019. Kodansha collected its chapters in seve tankōbon volumes, released from November 6, 2017, to June 6, 2019.

==== Volumes ====
No.	Release date	ISBN
1	November 6, 2017	978-4-06-510356-2
2	February 6, 2018	978-4-06-510892-5
3	May 7, 2018	978-4-06-511454-4
4	August 6, 2018	978-4-06-512438-3
5	November 6, 2018	978-4-06-513561-7
6	March 6, 2019	978-4-06-514564-7
7	June 6, 2019	978-4-06-516131-9

=== Anime ===
An anime adaptation produced by Seven Arcs Pictures was announced in July 2017. It aired for 24 episodes on Tokyo MX, tvk, Sun TV, KBS Kyoto, BS11, AT-X from January 9 to June 19, 2018.

Crunchyroll streamed the series with English subtitles and Funimation with English dubbing at the same time as it aired in Japan.

== Reception ==
By August 2018, the novel had over 500,000 copies in circulation. (Note: From the notation on the manga's fourth tankōbon volume.)
