= Confession (manga) =

Japanese manga series

- Tankōbon volume cover, featuring Asai (left) and Ishikura (right)

告白 (Kokuhaku)
- Genre: Crime; Psychological thriller
- Manga
- Written by: Nobuyuki Fukumoto
- Illustrated by: Kaiji Kawaguchi
- Published by: Kodansha
- English publisher: NA: Kodansha USA
- Magazine: Young Magazine Uppers
- Published: 1998
- Volumes: 1
- Live-action film
- Directed by: Nobuhiro Yamashita
- Written by: Shūji Yuki; Ryō Takada
- Music by: Masa Takumi
- Studio: Gaga Corporation
- Released: May 31, 2024
- Runtime: 76 minutes
- icon

Confession (Japanese: 告白, Hepburn: Kokuhaku) is a Japanese manga series written by Nobuyuki Fukumoto and illustrated by Kaiji Kawaguchi. It was serialized in Kodansha's seinen manga magazine Young Magazine Uppers in 1998, with its chapters collected in a single tankōbon volume. A live-action film adaptation premiered in May 2024.

== Plot ==
The story follows two friends from the J University mountaineering club, Asai (浅井) and Ishikura (石倉), who are hiking the 3,200-meter peak of Mount Obari. When a storm hits, they become lost, and Ishikura falls and injures his leg. Believing he is about to die, Ishikura confesses to Asai that five years earlier, he murdered a fellow club member, Sayuri Nishida (西田さゆり, Nishida Sayuri), whose death was reported as an accident. Opportunely, Asai spots a nearby lodge and carries Ishikura there, ensuring their survival while they wait for help. However, Ishikura begins to regret his confession. Sensing this, Asai panics, fearing that he too may be killed for knowing Ishikura's crime.

== Media ==
=== Manga ===
Written by Nobuyuki Fukumoto and illustrated by Kaiji Kawaguchi, Confession was serialized in Kodansha's seinen manga magazine Young Magazine Uppers in 1998. Kodansha collected its chapters in a single tankōbon volume, released on July 9, 1999; a shinsōban edition was released on January 23, 2001; and a bunkoban edition was released on December 12, 2007. A new edition was released on April 5, 2024.

In March 2024, Kodansha USA announced that they had licensed the manga for print release, with the volume published on December 17 of the same year.

=== Film ===
In January 2024, it was announced that the manga would receive a live-action film adaptation, which premiered on May 31 of the same year. It was produced by Gaga Corporation, directed by Nobuhiro Yamashita, with scripts by Shūji Yuki and Ryō Takada, and music composed by Masa Takumi. It stars Toma Ikuta and Yang Ik-june. The film's theme song is "Satsui vs. Satsui (Kyohan: Ikuta Tōma) (殺意vs殺意 (共犯：生田斗真); "Murderous Intent vs. Murderous intent, with Accomplice Toma Ikuta"), performed by Maximum the Hormone. It was screened at the 28th Fantasia International Film Festival on July 19, 2024.

== Reception ==
Shuichi Oguro of Kono Manga ga Sugoi! Web wrote that the series "exquisitely matches the extreme situation and abnormal psychology", praising the psychological depiction in the story crafted by Fukumoto. Ettore Gabrielli from Lo Spazio Bianco praised the series for its atmosphere and the tension between the main characters, commending as well Kawaguchi's artwork, recommending it to thriller fans.

The series was listed in the top 10 of the American Library Association's 2025 Best Graphic Novels for Adults list.
