= Eye of the Dog, Jyuzo =

Japanese manga series

- First tankōbon volume cover of new edition of Eye of the Dog, Jyuzo published by Kodansha in September 2003

鬼斬り十蔵 (Onikiri Jūzō)
- Genre: Epic, Fantasy
- Manga
- Written by: Masaki Segawa
- Published by: Kodansha
- Magazine: Young Magazine Uppers
- Original run: April 1, 1998 – August 2, 2000
- Volumes: 4

Eye of the Dog, Jyuzo (Japanese: 鬼斬り十蔵, Hepburn: Onikiri Jūzō) is a Japanese manga series written and illustrated by Masaki Segawa. It was serialized in Kodansha's seinen manga magazine Young Magazine Uppers from April 1998 to August 2000, with its chapters collected in four tankōbon volumes as of September 2000.

== Plot ==
Ashiya Doman, a powerful sorcerer from the Heian era, was defeated by the onmyoji Abe no Seimei and sealed within a demon-imprisoning sword for over eight hundred years. In the present era, Doman returns as a demon and takes possession of the body of Genzo, a descendant of Seimei, in order to carry out his long-awaited revenge. During this process, Genzo's soul is displaced into the body of his younger sister, Kanako, while Doman begins executing his plans using Genzo's body.

The swordsman Jyuzo, who is engaged to Kanako, sets out to stop Doman and recover Genzo's body, while also trying to restore Kanako. Along the way, he becomes entangled with Osaki, a kitsune spirit who is also pursuing Doman due to a complicated past involving both hatred and attachment.

== Publication ==
Written and illustrated by Masaki Segawa, Eye of the Dog, Jyuzo was serialized in Kodansha's seinen manga magazine Young Magazine Uppers from April 1, 1998, (Note: It started in the magazine's first issue of 1998 (cover date April 15), which was released on April 1.) to August 2, 2000. (Note: It finished in the magazine's 16th issue of 2000 (cover date August 16), which was released on August 2.) Kodansha collected its chapters in four tankōbon volumes, released from January 7, 1999, to September 8, 2000. the company later released two new edition, first from September 16, 2003, to October 9, 2003. and the other, from February 6, 2015, to May 1, 2015.

=== Volumes ===
==== New edition ====
No.	Release date	ISBN
1	February 6, 2015	978-4-06-377140-4
2	March 6, 2015	978-4-06-377141-1
3	April 6, 2015	978-4-06-377163-3
4	May 1, 2015	978-4-06-377188-6

== See also ==
- Basilisk, another manga series by the same author
- Jū: Ninpō Makai Tenshō, another manga series by the same author
