= Yashamaru =

Yashamaru may refer to:

- Yashamaru (Naruto), a fictional character from the anime and manga series Naruto.
- Yashamaru, a fictional character from the novel The Kouga Ninja Scrolls
  - Yashamaru (Basilisk), a fictional character in the manga series Basilisk, based on The Kouga Ninja Scrolls character.
- Yashamaru, a childhood name of Katō Kiyomasa.
