= Basilisk (manga) =

Japanese manga series and its anime adaptation

- First tankōbon volume cover, featuring Kouga Gennosuke

バジリスク〜甲賀忍法帖〜 (Basilisk: The Kōga Ninja Scrolls)
- Genre: Action; Historical; Martial arts
- Manga
- Written by: Masaki Segawa
- Published by: Kodansha
- English publisher: NA: Del Rey Manga (former); Kodansha USA (digital); UK: Tanoshimi
- Magazine: Young Magazine Uppers
- Original run: February 2003 – July 2004
- Volumes: 5
- Anime television series
- Directed by: Fumitomo Kizaki
- Produced by: Hidemasa Arai; Hideyuki Nanba
- Written by: Yasuyuki Mutō
- Music by: Kō Nakagawa
- Studio: Gonzo
- Licensed by: Crunchyroll (Note: Formerly known as Funimation.): UK: MVM Films
- Original network: TV Saitama, TV Kanagawa, Chiba TV, KBS, AT-X
- English network: CA: Razer; US: IFC, Funimation Channel; ZA: Animax
- Original run: April 12, 2005 – September 20, 2005
- Episodes: 24
- Sequel
- Basilisk: The Ouka Ninja Scrolls (2015 novel)

Basilisk (Japanese: バジリスク〜甲賀忍法帖〜, Hepburn: Bajirisuku ~Kōga Ninpō Chō~; lit. Basilisk: The Kōga Ninja Scrolls) is a Japanese manga series by Masaki Segawa, based on Futaro Yamada's 1958 novel The Kouga Ninja Scrolls. It was serialized in Kodansha's seinen manga magazine Young Magazine Uppers from February 2003 to July 2004. The story takes place in the year 1614. Two ninja clans, Iga of Tsubagakure and the Kouga of Manjidani, battle each other to determine which grandson of Tokugawa Ieyasu will become the next shogun. The deadly competition between ten elite ninja from each clan unleashes a centuries-old hatred that threatens to destroy all hope for peace between them.

Del Rey Manga licensed the manga for an English-language release in North America; they published five volumes from May 2006 to May 2007. After Del Rey Manga's license expired, in September 2014, Kodansha USA acquired the license for print and digital in North America.

A 24-episode anime television series by Gonzo was broadcast in Japan from April to September 2005. Segawa continued producing serialized adaptations of Futaro Yamada's novels with The Yagyu Ninja Scrolls in 2005, Yama Fu-Tang in 2010 and Jū: Ninpō Makai Tenshō in 2012. Additionally, a two-part novel sequel, titled Basilisk: The Ouka Ninja Scrolls, penned by Masaki Yamada with illustrations by Segawa, was published in November and December 2015.

Basilisk won the 2004 Kodansha Manga Award in the general category.

== Plot ==
At the dawn of Japan's Azuchi-Momoyama period (the late 16th century) two rival ninja clans, the Iga Tsubagakure and Kouga Manjidani, are engaged in a bitter blood feud that has spanned for centuries. The fighting finally ends when Hattori Hanzō the 1st succeeds in forging a cease fire between the two clans by conscripting both into the service of Tokugawa Ieyasu (the man who seized power to become shogun and form Japan's first truly stable form of centralized government). Regardless, hostilities and bad blood remain between Kouga and Iga, ensuring a tenuous co-existence at best.

Fast forward to the year 1614; Ieyasu has retired from power (although he still wields considerable influence within the government) and passed the torch to his son Hidetada. Unfortunately, a succession dispute has risen concerning which of Ieyasu's grandsons are destined to take up the reins of power when their father finally decides to step down. The various government retainers are beginning to take sides and the Tokugawa Shogunate is on the verge of tearing itself apart.

In order to solve the problem before it spirals out of control, Ieyasu orders the no hostilities pact between Kouga and Iga canceled and promptly commands each clan to send 10 of their best ninja to enter a ruthless and bloody competition of kill or be killed. Each clan will represent one of the two factions supporting Ieyasu's grandsons; the names of their selected fighters recorded on two identical scrolls to be marked out in blood upon their death. The clan that slays the chosen ten of the other will be given favor for a thousand years while the grandson they represent will be pronounced the undisputed heir to the Shogunate.

Prior to the conflicts renewal, Kouga and Iga's two young heirs (Gennosuke and Oboro respectively) were betrothed to each other in the hopes that their union would finally dispel their clans' long-seated animosity toward each other. Forced headlong onto separate sides of a conflict they want no part of, Gennosuke and Oboro must now choose whether to kill the person they love or lead their entire clan to annihilation.

== Media ==
=== Manga ===
Basilisk was serialized in Kodansha's Young Magazine Uppers from February 2003 to July 2004. The publisher, Kodansha, collected the individual chapters into five tankōbon volumes between April 30, 2003, and August 7, 2004.

In December 2004 it was announced that the series was licensed for English release in North America by Del Rey Manga. The company released the first volume of the series with several hiatuses on May 30, 2006, and continued until the release of the fifth and final volume on May 29, 2007. Tanoshimi published the manga in the UK. Kodansha USA released the manga digitally from September 2 to September 9, 2014. In September 2023, the digital manga platform Azuki added Basilisk to its service.

==== Volumes ====
No.	Original release date	Original ISBN	English release date	English ISBN
1	April 30, 2003	978-4-06-346197-8	May 30, 2006 (Del Rey Manga); September 2, 2014 (digital, Kodansha USA)	978-0-34-548270-9 (Del Rey Manga); 978-0-34-548270-9 (Kodansha USA)
2	September 13, 2003	978-4-06-346212-8	August 1, 2006 (Del Rey Manga); September 2, 2014 (digital, Kodansha USA)	978-0-34-548271-6 (Del Rey Manga); 978-0-34-548271-6 (Kodansha USA)
3	January 18, 2004	978-4-06-346233-3	December 12, 2006 (Del Rey Manga); September 2, 2014 (digital, Kodansha USA)	978-0-34-548272-3 (Del Rey Manga); 978-0-34-548272-3 (Kodansha USA)
4	April 8, 2004	978-4-06-346238-8	February 27, 2007 (Del Rey Manga); September 2, 2014 (digital, Kodansha USA)	978-0-34-549046-9 (Del Rey Manga); 978-0-34-549046-9 (Kodansha USA)
5	August 7, 2004	978-4-06-346246-3	May 29, 2007 (Del Rey Manga); September 9, 2014 (digital, Kodansha USA)	978-0-34-549047-6 (Del Rey Manga); 978-0-34-549047-6 (Kodansha USA)

=== Anime ===
The first series, Basilisk: The Kōga Ninja Scrolls, produced by Gonzo premiered in Japan on the television stations TV Saitama, TV Kanagawa, Chiba TV, Mie TV, KBS and Mie TV between April and September 2005. In June 2005, North American anime distributor Funimation Entertainment announced that they had acquired the series, released the series as DVD volumes between 2006 and 2007 and released again on Blu-ray in 2009 and 2015.

== Reception ==
Basilisk won the 2004 Kodansha Manga Award in the general category. By July 2017, the manga had over 1.7 million copies in circulation.

== See also ==
- Eye of the Dog, Jyuzo, another manga series by Masaki Segawa
- Jū: Ninpō Makai Tenshō, another manga series by the same author
