= Kishin Corps =

Japanese light novel series

機神兵団 (Kishin Heidan)
- Genre: Action, Military, Mecha, Science fiction, Alternate history
- Light novel
- Written by: Masaki Yamada
- Published by: Chuokoron-sha
- Original run: 1990 – 1994
- Volumes: 10
- Original video animation

Alien Defender Geo-Armor: Kishin Corps
- Directed by: Takaaki Ishiyama; Kazunori Mizuno
- Music by: Kaoru Wada
- Studio: AIC; Pioneer LDC
- Licensed by: NA: Geneon USA
- Released: March 24, 1993 – August 25, 1994
- Runtime: 30 minutes per episode
- Episodes: 7
- Manga
- Written by: Masaki Yamada
- Illustrated by: Shohei Oka
- Published by: Tokuma Shoten
- Magazine: Monthly Shōnen Captain
- Original run: 1994 – 1995
- Volumes: 3

Kishin Corps (機神兵団, Kishin Heidan), also called Alien Defender Geo-Armor: Kishin Corps, is a series of Japanese light novels written and illustrated by Masaki Yamada. The series was published in 10 volumes between 1990 and 1994. It is a work of alternate history, taking place in 1941 during World War II. An alien race invades the earth and their forces ally themselves with the Axis powers. To combat these aliens an elite allied unit called the Kishin Corps is created, using alien technology. The story deals with the main character Taishi, who obtains a secret alien device from his father, which the Germans are after to build their own robots.

An original video animation titled Alien Defender Geo-Armor: Kishin Corps was produced by Geneon, co-directed by Takaaki Ishiyama and Kazunori Mizuno, and released in Japan between March 24, 1993, and August 25, 1994.

== Plot ==
The series follows the Kishin Corps, a multinational alliance made up of forces from the United States, France, the United Kingdom, and elements of the Japanese armed forces. They were formed to defend the world against an army of alien invaders, using a fleet of four mechs, known as Kishins. They travel across the world on missions spanning nearly the full length of the war, with the organization being founded in August of 1941, and embarking on their final mission to drive aliens off of the planet on April 12, 1945. In addition to aliens, they also fight members of the Japanese military, who intend to steal the technology used to make Kishins, in order to win the war in the pacific. Later on, the Nazis become a reoccurring villain, as they make contact with the alien leadership and begin learning from them, eventually developing their own line of mass produced Kishins.

The aliens are eventually defeated, and with them gone the Axis is doomed to lose the war. This is further compounded by the United States developing nuclear weapons earlier than in our timeline, being fully ready to begin strikes across Germany in early april.

== Reception ==
=== Novels ===
In 1995, Kishin Corps won the Seiun Award for "Best Japanese Novel of the Year".

=== Anime ===
The Encyclopedia of Science Fiction described Kishin Corps as an enjoyable, pulp-style adventure, comparing its spirit to that of the Indiana Jones franchise, albeit with a greater emphasis on technology. It praised the story and its exciting, well-animated action sequences, but criticized the uneven pacing, particularly the slow progression of the latter half of the series and its comparatively rushed conclusion. The encyclopedia also noted several underdeveloped plot elements, including the nature and motivations of the alien invaders. Regarding the series' alternate history setting, it observed that Japan's responsibility for World War II was downplayed, with much of the blame assigned to the Kwantung Army and the fictional Colonel Shinkai. Despite these shortcomings, it considered the series entertaining overall.

== See also ==
- Worldwar series
