= Kaiji Kawaguchi =

Japanese manga artist (born 1948)

- Born: July 27, 1948 (age 78); Onomichi, Hiroshima, Japan
- Education: Meiji University
- Occupation: Manga artist
- Years active: 1968–present
- Notable work: The Silent Service; Zipang; A Spirit of the Sun; Kūbo Ibuki
- Awards: Kodansha Manga Award (1987, 1990, 2002); Shogakukan Manga Award (2006, 2018)

Kaiji Kawaguchi (Japanese: 川口 開治 or かわぐち かいじ, Hepburn: Kawaguchi Kaiji; born July 27, 1948) is a Japanese manga artist. He is known for works such as The Silent Service, Zipang, A Spirit of the Sun and Kūbo Ibuki. Generally, his stories involve Japan and examine the moral choices that people make in extreme situations.

== Early life and career ==
In elementary school, Kaiji and his younger identical twin brother Kyōji became engrossed in manga. Kyōji took over running the Kawaguchi family business, but was also a manga artist before dying in 2013. Kaiji's daughter Nirako is an illustrator, while his eldest son Kōhei is a Kanze noh actor. In 1968, Kaiji made his professional debut with Yoru ga Aketara in Young Comic at age 21, while still attending Meiji University.

== Influences and style ==
Kawaguchi was influenced by Shinji Nagashima, Tatsuhiko Yamagami's Hikaru Kaze, and Tadao Tsuge. He also said that if it were not for the freedom and more adult material seen in gekiga, he probably would not have become a manga artist. In seventh grade he became interested in cinematography after seeing Akira Kurosawa's Yojimbo. This early influence from film is still seen in his manga names, which are largely text and more like film screenplays, which he read for fun in high school, than the usual storyboards.

In the middle of serializing Hard & Loose (1983–87), Kawaguchi started drawing the eyes of his characters bigger. This was a suggestion by his editor, who told him that emotion is conveyed through the eyes. Before he made this switch, Kawaguchi said he never would have thought he would be able to draw Westerners and set his manga overseas. The artist cited his work in Actor (1984–88) as the basis for his current style. Kawaguchi was a heavy smoker who insisted a cigarette was "indispensable" when drawing. However, after being treated for esophageal cancer in 2019, he quit smoking.

== Works ==
- Gunka no Hibiki (1975–76), story by Ryō Hanmura
- Terror no Keifu (1975)
- Pro: Mahjong-kai no Hikari to Kage (1981–84)
- Iki ni Kanzu (1983), story by Yūjirō Yoshida
- Hard & Loose (1983–87), story by Marley Carib
- Kiba-Ken (1984–85), story by Fumio Azuma
- Actor (1984–88)
- Ai Monogatari (1987–89)
- The Silent Service (1988–96)
- Medusa (1990–94)
- Mosaren Bugi (1991–92)
- Shisetsu Tantei Akai Kiba (1991), story by Azusa Katsume
- Gokudou Shippuden: Bakudan (1992)
- Tantei Hammer (1992)
- Yellow (1995), story by Shinji Miyazaki
- Cocoro (1997)
- Araragi Tokkyu (1997)
- Eagle (1997–2001)
- Ruri no kamikaze (1998)
- Bullet & Beast (1998–99)
- Confession (1998), story by Nobuyuki Fukumoto
- Seizon Life (2000), story by Nobuyuki Fukumoto
- The Battery (2001)
- Kuroi Taiyō (2001)
- Zipang (2000–09)
- A Spirit of the Sun (2002–10)
- Kousetsu Mahjong Shinsengumi (2006–07)
- Ginrō ni Kodoku wo Mita (2007), story by Saho Sasazawa
- Hyōma no Hata (2011–14)
- Boku wa Beatles (2011–12), story by Tetsuo Fujii
- Rijin no Fushigi na Yakyū (Jo) (2012)
- Zipang: Shinsō Kairyū (2012)
- Burai-hen (2013)
- Kūbo Ibuki (2014–2019)
- Kūbo Ibuki Great Game (2019–present)

== Accolades ==
He has received the Kodansha Manga Award three times, for Actor in 1987, The Silent Service in 1990, and Zipang in 2002. He has also received the Shogakukan Manga Award twice, for A Spirit of the Sun in 2006 and Kūbo Ibuki in 2018.A Spirit of the Sun also won the 2006 manga award at the Japan Media Arts Festival.
