= Zipang (manga) =

Japanese manga series

- Cover of volume 43 of the manga Zipang by Kaiji Kawaguchi, as published by Kodansha

ジパング (Jipangu)
- Genre: Alternate history; Military
- Manga
- Written by: Kaiji Kawaguchi
- Published by: Kodansha
- Magazine: Morning
- Original run: July 2000 – November 2009
- Volumes: 43
- Anime television series
- Directed by: Kazuhiro Furuhashi
- Written by: Kazuhiro Furuhashi; Yuichiro Takeda
- Music by: Toshihiko Sahashi
- Studio: Studio Deen
- Licensed by: NA: Geneon Entertainment
- Original network: TBS
- Original run: October 7, 2004 – March 31, 2005
- Episodes: 26
- icon

Zipang (Japanese: ジパング, Hepburn: Jipangu) is a Japanese manga series written and illustrated by Kaiji Kawaguchi. It was serialized in Kodansha's seinen manga magazine Morning from 2000 to 2009, with its chapters collected in forty-three tankōbon volumes. It follows a Japan Maritime Self-Defense Force destroyer and its crew being transported back in time more than 60 years to the Pacific theatre of World War II. The struggle of the crew from a peaceful future Japan to resist the nationalistic appeal of altering history and defending their country, knowing that in this time it is ruled by totalitarian militarists, is the central theme of Zipang.

A twenty-six episode anime television series by Studio Deen and directed by Kazuhiro Furuhashi was broadcast on TBS from 2004 to 2005. It was licensed for English release in North America by Geneon Entertainment.

== Plot ==
In the 2000s, the JDS Mirai, the newest and most advanced helicopter destroyer in the Japan Maritime Self-Defense Force, sails from Japan on a naval exercise with the United States Navy off Ecuador. En route, a strange meteorological anomaly causes the Mirai to lose contact with her sister ships. The crew soon encounters a fleet containing the Yamato, sunk in 1945, and a Nagato-class battleship. They realise they have travelled through a time slip to June 4, 1942, the first day of the Battle of Midway. Although some crew members want to use the Mirai's superior technology to save the four aircraft carriers of the 1st Air Fleet and the 3,000 lives that will otherwise be lost, they agree that their priority is returning home and therefore avoid actions that might change history.

Despite this policy, the Mirai's crew becomes increasingly involved in the war while refusing to side with either Japan or the Allies. They rescue IJN Lt. Commander Kusaka, a staunch militarist who seeks to create a stronger Japan called "Zipang" and who would otherwise have died. Their intervention causes major historical changes, including the death of Executive Officer Yōsuke Kadomatsu's father in a childhood car accident, meaning Kadomatsu can no longer exist in the future. Learning that Kusaka is travelling to Manchuria to secure oil, Kadomatsu leaves the Mirai to stop him. In Manchukuo, he joins a lieutenant of Mitsumasa Yonai at a parade in Changchun attended by Emperor Puyi. Kusaka and his followers intend to assassinate Puyi and seize Manchuria for Zipang. Kadomatsu saves Puyi from an assassin pilot, but Kusaka shoots Kadomatsu and Yonai's lieutenant, then kills Puyi. Not intending to kill the two men, Kusaka orders his doctor to treat them. Kadomatsu subsequently decides to use the Mirai and his knowledge of the future to save as many lives as possible.

While the Mirai undergoes repairs at Yokosuka Naval Arsenal, Gunnery Officer Masayuki Kikuchi questions whether changing history is inevitable and whether Zipang represents a better future. The Mirai later escorts a transport carrying 4,000 Imperial Japanese Army soldiers from Kiska during the Aleutian Islands campaign. It is forced to sink the USS North Carolina and fight Atlanta-class light cruisers, but saves the transport and is formally celebrated by the IJN. Meanwhile, Kusaka sends Tsuda to assassinate Adolf Hitler; the failed attempt is a diversion enabling Kusaka to steal uranium from the Nazi nuclear program. During operations against American submarines and the evacuation of New Guinea, VTOL pilot Mamoru Satake is killed covering the withdrawal. Kikuchi then launches a mutiny, seizes the Mirai, and takes part in the South-East Asian theatre, intending to attack India. Kadomatsu retakes the ship with help from Kōhei Oguri, Sachiko Momoi and Kisaragi. Kikuchi is injured during the Japanese withdrawal at the Battle of Tarawa and takes refuge in Palau with Momoi and Kisaragi. Captain Saburō Umezu, having learned that Kusaka is developing the atomic bomb, travels from hospital in Yokosuka to Nanjing to stop him, but fails and is killed.

In 1944, the Yamato, now fighting for Kusaka, is sunk by the Mirai, killing Kusaka in a vortex. Its subsequent nuclear explosion reveals that it carried an atomic bomb. Although the blast causes little damage, it alerts the Americans to the apparent success of the Japanese nuclear weapons program. The Mirai is eventually sunk by a stray shell fired by American ships, killing its entire crew. Neither side rescues the survivors, except the crippled Kadomatsu, who is recovered by the Americans. Unable to return to his own time because the altered history has erased his original existence, and persuaded by Kusaka to create "Zipang", Kadomatsu offers his knowledge of the European theatre to the Allies and is taken to Washington, D.C..

The Mirai's actions produce lasting changes. In 1944, the U.S. and Japan sign a peace treaty; in 1945, militarist factions are removed in a coup d'état, enabling Japan to democratise. The Pan-Pacific Treaty Organization is established in 1947, while Japan relinquishes its imperial-era colonies. By 1957, postwar Japan is prosperous after avoiding severe attacks on the mainland. Kadomatsu, now wealthy in Nantucket after advising the U.S. government, returns to Japan in 1970.

When the 2000s arrive again, Kadomatsu attends the christening of a new JDS Mirai and discovers that its crew members are almost identical to those of the original ship, except himself. He realises that he alone survived because two versions of the same person cannot coexist: his father's death meant his original self was never born in this timeline, allowing him to remain alive, while the original Mirai crew died so that they could later be born as history intended. Although the new crew has never met Kadomatsu, they all sense that someone is missing. The new Mirai departs for its naval exercise with the United States Navy and reaches Ecuador without incident, leaving only Kadomatsu aware of how events might otherwise have unfolded.

== JDS Mirai ==
JDS Mirai (DDH-182) is the fictional helicopter defense destroyer of the Japan Maritime Self-Defense Force (JMSDF), created for the manga. Mirai is transported back sixty years through time to 1942 on the eve of the Battle of Midway. The ship's weapons alone are enough to change the course of World War II, but equally potent are the advanced technology and knowledge of future events on board. The name of the ship is a homophone for the Japanese word meaning "future" and is often the basis of double entendres in the anime. The phrase "Mirai no nipponjin" (みらいの日本人), often repeated in the anime, for example, can mean "Japanese people of the ship Mirai" or "Japanese people of the future."

=== Class description ===
The Mirai' as depicted in the anime adaptation.

The Mirai is a ship of a fictional Yukinami-class of helicopter defense destroyer, which was created specifically for the story. The fictional ships are essentially an improved version of the actual Japan Maritime Self-Defense Force Kongo-class destroyer. All these ships are equipped with the Aegis Combat System that provides the vessels possessing it the capability to locate, track and target a large number of enemy vessels, aircraft and even missiles at ranges and with accuracy that was unimaginable in World War II.

The JDS Mirai is sometimes described as a cruiser rather than a destroyer. This is because a modern guided missile destroyer is about the size of a World War II light cruiser (the Mirai is actually longer than the Kuma-class cruiser and broader than the Takao-class heavy cruisers) and, in the context of the story, the WW II era characters misidentify the Mirai as a cruiser. Some sources have picked up this misidentification and reported it as factual.

=== MV/SA-32J Umidori ===
The Umidori with wings in hover mode, as depicted in the anime

The MV/SA-32J Umidori (English: Seagull) is a fictional aircraft created for the series. In it, it is a twin turboshaft engine, multi-mission Japan Maritime Self-Defense Force VTOL tilt-wing armed reconnaissance aircraft deployed aboard the destroyer Mirai.

The MV/SA-32J has two large, five-bladed propellers mounted on nacelles in its wings. The wings both tilt, for vertical take-off and landing (VTOL), and fold, for storage within the Mirai's hangar. It appears that its engines are not in the wing nacelles, which are too small and do not have any air intakes. Air intakes and engine exhausts in the lower part of the fuselage indicate that the engines are located there, presumably connected to the propellers by some complicated mechanical linkage.

The design of the Umidori appears to be influenced by the Canadair CL-84 Dynavert Tiltwing, which was intended for projected Sea Control Ships of the 1970s The modern design of the Umidori incorporates features of the Bell XV-15 in terms of aerodynamic form and size, and in turn of the later, larger V-22 Osprey.

== Characters ==
=== Fictional ===
Yōsuke Kadomatsu (角松 洋介, Kadomatsu Yousuke)
Voiced by: Tetsu Inada (Japanese); Mark R. Kaufmann, replaced with George N. Cahill III for the last three episodes (English)
Executive Officer (X.O.) and second in command aboard the Japan Maritime Self-Defense Force escort vessel JDS Mirai (DDG-182). He always respects human life, and the action of saving Kusaka's life took priority over the implications this would have on the course of history. He feels responsibility for however history may have been changed because of Kusaka, and attempts to stop Kusaka's actions.
Takumi Kusaka (草加 拓海, Kusaka Takumi)
Voiced by: Hiroki Tōchi (Japanese); Edward Choy Keng Choong (English)
An IJN Lt. Commander whose courier plane was shot down during the Battle of Midway and rescued by Kadomatsu. He considers the encounter with the Mirai as an opportunity to change the history for the "better" (from his perspective, at least.) He rejects both the militarism of the Japanese Empire and shame of defeat that he attributes to the postwar Japan. Instead, he seeks to create a new undefeated Japan that he calls "Zipang". While he admires the humanism of Kadomatsu, he dismisses it as a luxury unsuited for wartime and is willing to shed a great deal of blood in pursuit of his ideals.
Masayuki Kikuchi (菊池 雅行, Kikuchi Masayuki)
Voiced by: Takanori Hoshino (Japanese); Paul Pistore (English)
Gunnery Officer and third in command aboard the JMSDF vessel JDS Mirai (DDG-182). Kikuchi has been best friends with Kadomatsu and Oguri ever since they were in the same batch during their time at the Japan Maritime Academy. He has a strong sense of justice and does not like taking lives. Kikuchi is usually calm in making decisions, rarely breaking out a sweat when he faces extreme situations. During early volumes of the manga, Kikuchi proposed the Mirai crew to avoid changing the past as much as possible. After events of the battle with the U.S. Navy aircraft carrier, USS Wasp, Kikuchi changes his stance on attacking enemy targets, putting the reason that Mirai is put in danger and they are doing it for self-defense.
Kōhei Oguri (尾栗 康平, Oguri Kouhei)
Voiced by: Yuji Ueda (Japanese); Jamie Meldrum (English)
Navigation Officer aboard the JDS Mirai (DDG-182). Oguri is best friends with Kadomatsu and Kikuchi during their time in the Maritime Academy. He is joint third in command alongside Kikuchi aboard Mirai. Oguri is the most outspoken of the three of them, but he is also impulsive when making decisions. In contrast, his personality is opposite to Kikuchi. When Kusaka was initially rescued, Oguri proposes that they should release information to him, without thinking of the consequences. He often goes into debate with Kikuchi on whether it's right to attack their own people from the past out of self-defense, or taking innocent lives even though Mirai is being attacked by enemy forces, changing the past as a result. When Kadomatsu goes after Kusaka in Manchuria, Oguri and the rest of the crew set up C4 explosives around Mirai in any case the ship is about to be captured.
Saburō Umezu (梅津 三郎, Umezu Saburou)
Voiced by: Yuusaku Yara (Japanese); Joe Murray (English)
Captain and first in command of the JDS Mirai (DDG-182). Umezu takes care of his crew and puts the safety of his men as first priority. Over the years, he is given the nickname "Hiruandon" (昼行灯), which means "a night lamp during the day" or "one who does not stand out", by people who worked with him, as he is a modest person who does not get too much attention around himself. When Mirai was confirmed to be mysteriously brought into the past, Umezu proposes the crew not to get involved with events during the 2nd World War so as not to change history. Umezu is wise in making reasonable decisions whenever Mirai is under attack or whether the crew should join in battle with the old Japanese army.
Sachiko Momoi (桃井 佐知子, Momoi Sachiko)
Voiced by: Yoshiko Iseki (Japanese); Chio Su Ping (English)
Rank of Lieutenant and medic aboard the JDS Mirai (DDG-182). Momoi is the only female crew member on the ship. She is responsible for the first aid and care of the crew on board Mirai. She is much more neutral to viewpoints and does not go into debate over changing events in history, as she holds her top priority over first aid.
Mamoru Satake (佐竹 守, Satake Mamoru)
Voiced by: Takashi Matsuyama
Rank of Lieutenant and pilot of the MVSA-32J VTOL aircraft Umidori (Seagull) aboard the JDS Mirai (DDG-182). Satake is at times serious and sometimes fail to abide regulations. When Mirai appeared in the past just days only, Satake and his gunner, Mori, were assigned by Kadomatsu on a reconnaissance mission around Ogasawara. Satake made the mistake of flying the Umidori only 500 feet (150 m) above the islands, getting the attention of 2 Type 2 Floatplane fighters. During the ensuing battle, Mori was killed, and Satake blames himself for making unsafe decisions.
Mori (森, Mori)
Voiced by: Makoto Tomita (Japanese); William A. H. Reid (English)
Rank of 3rd Ensign and gunner of the MVSA-32J VTOL aircraft Umidori (Seagull) aboard the JDS Mirai (DDG-182). Mori is an enthusiastic and energetic young man at age twenty. He was assigned along with Satake on a reconnaissance mission by Kadomatsu to Ogasawara. Mori displayed doubts when Satake made the decision to fly the Umidori 500 feet (150 m) above the islands, but trusts in the man to keep both the gyrocopter and them safe. When Type 2 Floatplane fighters discovered their presence, he is killed by shots sprayed into the cockpit of the Umidori by the enemy fighters; he is the first crew member of Mirai to die following their arrival in the past.

=== Historical ===
Admiral Isoroku Yamamoto
He is the one that summons Tsuda to investigate the Mirai, and later works to develop the uneasy partnership with the crew of the JMSDF Mirai.
Alexander Vandegrift
Commander of the U.S. Navy task force.

Other historical characters depicted include Gunichi Mikawa, Kiyonao Ichiki, Kanji Ishiwara, Matome Ugaki, Leigh Noyes, and Mitsumasa Yonai.

== Media ==
=== Manga ===
Written and illustrated by Kaiji Kawaguchi, Zipang was serialized in Kodansha's seinen manga magazine Weekly Morning from July 2000 to November 2009. Kodansha collected its chapters in forty-three tankōbon volumes, released from January 23, 2001, to December 22, 2009.

=== Anime ===
An anime adaptation of Zipang was produced by Studio Deen and directed by Kazuhiro Furuhashi. Tokyo Broadcasting System Television broadcast the anime series in Japan from October 7, 2004, to March 31, 2005. Since a Japan Maritime Self-Defense Force official on active service was involved in the production, some unrealistic scenes were cut from the anime version. In 2017, scholar Takayoshi Yamamura noted that anime was produced in the collaboration with the JMSDF.

At the 2006 Anime Expo, the company Geneon announced that it has licensed Zipang for distribution in North America. The first DVD was released in September of that year.

==== Episodes ====
No.	Title	Original release date
1	"The Mirai Sets Sail"; Transliteration: "Mirai Shukkō" (Japanese: みらい出港)	October 7, 2004
The JDS Mirai sets sail from Japan as one of a four-ship squadron going to Hawaii scheduled for routine military exercises with the United States Navy. In the vicinity of Midway Island, they encounter a strange meteorological anomaly; the Mirai loses contact with her sister ships and finds herself coming face to face with what can only be the Imperial Japanese Navy battleship Yamato.
2	"Midway"; Transliteration: "Midduei" (Japanese: ミッドウェー)	October 14, 2004
The Mirai finds herself in the middle of the Combined Fleet formation of the night before the Battle of Midway. First, Mirai is signaled by the Yamato, the Combined Fleet flagship, then two destroyers attempt to block its path, but it successfully eludes the Imperial Japanese fleet using superior acceleration from modern gas turbine propulsion. Reluctantly, the crew realizes that they have traveled sixty years into their past, to the eve of the Battle of Midway. They witness the battle but make the difficult decision to not become involved so as not to affect history. Captain Umezu decides that, since they obviously cannot enter Pearl Harbor to reprovision as originally planned, they should head back to Yokosuka and hope that they may encounter the anomaly again on the return trip.
3	"Drifters"; Transliteration: "Hyōryūsha" (Japanese: 漂流者)	October 21, 2004
Kadomatsu rescues an Imperial Japanese Navy officer, Lt. Commander Kusaka, from a sinking seaplane. The Mirai's crew is split over the fact that they may have changed history. The Mirai is discovered by an American submarine, USS Guardfish (SS-217).
4	"Mirai's Battle"; Transliteration: "Mirai no Sentō" (Japanese: みらいの戦闘)	October 28, 2004
The Mirai narrowly escapes the American sub's torpedoes. A panicked sailor in the CIC launches an ASROC. Captain Umezu considers sinking the sub but, at the last moment, self-destructs the ASROC. The Americans escape with knowledge of a new Japanese ship with incredible capabilities. Kusaka learns that the ship is from the future. On board the battleship Yamato, Admiral Yamamoto summons Lt. Tsuda, a naval intelligence officer, to investigate the strange warship flying hinomaru that mysteriously appeared and quickly disappeared in the midst of the Combined Fleet just before the Battle of Midway.
5	"Kusaka's Choice"; Transliteration: "Kusaka no Sentaku" (Japanese: 草加の選択)	November 4, 2004
Kusaka is given access to the Mirai's record room and learns the outcome of the war and the future of Japan. He decides to throw in his lot with the Mirai. He is shown quoting from a speech by Sun Yat Sen in Kobe on November 28, 1924, when Sun asked whether Japan will seek Western way of domination (覇道) or Eastern way of kings (王道) as its future policy, as he weeps over the future that would descend on Japan. The VTOL Umidori is sent on a recon mission over the Japanese naval base at Chichi-jima in the Ogasawara Islands to evaluate the situation before sailing towards Honshu. While daydreaming about his grandfather, who is from the island, the overconfident pilot is engaged by two Japanese floatplane fighters whose pilots think it suspicious that the odd-looking plane should be trying to escape, despite the presence of the hinomaru insignia.
6	"Order of Attack"; Transliteration: "Kōgeki Meirei" (Japanese: 攻撃命令)	November 11, 2004
The VTOL recon plane damages the two fighters and forces them to ditch without injuring their pilots, but its weapon systems officer is killed, the Mirai's first casualty. Kusaka proposes that the Mirai go to Japanese-occupied Singapore, rather than Japanese mainland, to refuel and reprovision, He believes that he can arrange the resupply, armed with forged documents and fake currency produced on board the ship. Having examined Japanese Navy's personnel records in Mirai's record room extensively, Kusaka is certain that there is no one in Singapore who would recognize him.
7	"Malay Railway"; Transliteration: "Marā Tetsudō" (Japanese: マレー鉄道)	November 18, 2004
Kadomatsu and Kusaka travel by the Malayan Railway to Singapore, while the Mirai hides in the Anambas Archipelago. Kadomatsu gets a view of the colonized people and has a close call with a brutal Kempeitai inspection. In Singapore, Kusaka requisitions a tanker to carry supplies for a "special mission" for the navy. While waiting for the ship to sail, Kadomatsu and Kusaka attend a party. There, Kusaka is shocked to run into Lt. Tsuda, his kohai from the naval academy, who, according to Mirai's records, should not have been anywhere near Singapore. He remarks to Kadomatsu that this is no longer his past, since the actual events are already diverging from the records of Mirai's past — as evidenced by Tsuda's unexpected appearance in Singapore. Kadomatsu refuses to believe this and punches Kusaka in the face. In the meantime, the Mirai is spotted by a local fisherman.
8	"The Pursued"; Transliteration: "Tsuisekisha" (Japanese: 追跡者)	November 25, 2004
The two from the Mirai arrange for a tanker loaded with fuel and provisions to rendezvous with the destroyer. But Lt. Tsuda, having recognized Kusaka and realizing something odd is afoot, has found out about the ship. After being informed of the fisherman's discovery of a hidden Japanese warship in Anambas, he realizes that his encounter with Kusaka, mysterious purchases of fuel and foodstuffs on the black market, the unexplained "special mission" involving the tanker, and his mission regarding the mystery ship are all connected. He has the tanker's crew replaced with his own men and confronts Kusaka after the ship sets sail.
9	"Deadline"; Transliteration: "Deddorain" (Japanese: デッドライン)	December 2, 2004
Tsuda reveals that, in addition to the crew of the tanker, he has put together a sizable task force at Singapore around the cruiser Kashii for dealing with the mystery ship that he has been ordered to investigate, should it become necessary. However, Kusaka and Kadomatsu convince Tsuda that force will not work and ensure that the Mirai is fueled and provisioned accordingly. Tsuda has an opportunity to tour the Mirai but has difficulty coping with knowledge of the future. Kusaka tells Tsuda that the future is not fixed as recorded in Mirai's history, since its very presence is actively forcing changes, and that their job is to ensure that these lead to a "better" future for Japan. Specifically, he informs Tsuda that he intends to convince Captain Umezu and Admiral Yamamoto to change the outcome of the Battle of Guadalcanal. Captain Umezu accepts Kusaka's suggestion, though with much difficulty, and calls for a meeting of the senior officers to plan their moves.
10	"Interchange"; Transliteration: "Kōryū" (Japanese: 交流)	December 9, 2004
Lt. Commander Oguri and Lt. Satake visit the crew of the tanker and the sailors from the 21st and 20th centuries have an opportunity to learn about each other — and Oguri consequently arrives late and drunk to the staff meeting called by Captain Umezu. Plans for Guadalcanal are developed. Kikuchi thinks the Mirai should intercept the U.S. fleet and inflict enough casualties to convince the latter not to press the attack but Kusaka argues that Americans would not give up so easily and instead proposes to fly to the Japanese base at Truk to convince Admiral Yamamoto to withdraw Japanese forces instead so as to avoid the battle.
11	"Guadalcanal Island"; Transliteration: "Gadarukanaru Shima" (Japanese: ガダルカナル島)	December 16, 2004
Kusaka is flown in the Umidori to meet Yamamoto at Truk Island. The IJN staff find the idea of a ship from the future hard to believe, but the technologically advanced nature of the Umidori is indisputable. U.S. Marines in the attacking task force discuss stereotypes of the Japanese soldiers and get a more realistic view from their commander, General Alexander Vandegrift. At a private meeting with Admiral Yamamoto, Kusaka suggests that Japan should withdraw all the way to Manchuria, now that they have already broken the myth of European invincibility. Yamamoto replies by asking whether that means Japan should flee from the fight, Kusaka replies that he has another plan — which is left hidden from the viewers. Admiral Yamamoto then asks Kusaka what has happened to him on the Mirai, to which Kusaka replies that the experience opened his eyes as a Japanese. When Yamamoto asks what happened to him as a naval officer, Kusaka hands in his dirk in implicit resignation from the navy. Yamamoto, however, replies that the dirk is not his to accept — he can only hold on to it for a while. The crew of the Mirai devise a back-up plan to cause the Americans to withdraw from Guadalcanal should Kusaka fail to convince the Japanese command or betray them.
12	"The Arrow of Sagittarius"; Transliteration: "Sajitariusu no Ya" (Japanese: サジタリウスの矢)	December 23, 2004
A landing party from the Mirai on Guadalcanal has close calls with both the Japanese on the island and with the attacking American forces. The Mirai witnesses the Battle of Savo Island, where the Allied naval force covering the landing is destroyed by the Japanese Eighth Fleet under Admiral Gunichi Mikawa. When the Japanese fleet withdraws without attacking American transports, the crew of Mirai think history as they know it — in which the fear of a possible air attack from US carrier forces caused the Japanese fleet to withdraw prematurely — remains unchanged, but Admiral Mikawa remarks to his staff that he is in fact aware that U.S. carriers are far away and cannot intervene. The withdrawal, in fact, is a part of a larger strategy. General Vandegrift receives a message from the Mirai warning that, at 3 am, an "arrow of Sagittarius" will strike his camp as a demonstration of their power and that his men should withdraw immediately if they value their lives. Among the landing party, Lt. Commander Oguri wants to blow up the American ammunition dump, thinking that it would be more likely to strike fear into the Marines. However, Kadomatsu overrules him since such an attack would cause many casualties and orders the Marines' food supplies targeted instead.
13	"The Land of Gold"; Transliteration: "Ōgon no Kuni" (Japanese: 黄金の国)	December 30, 2004
Kadomatsu and his landing party use a laser designator to guide a blank Harpoon missile to strike the American supply depot, an attack which harms no one but demonstrates their ability to do so. But the Americans do not retreat as the Mirai's crew expect, but instead send out patrols into the jungle to ferret out suspected Japanese infiltrators. Meanwhile, a large Japanese fleet unrecorded in history, led by the battleship Yamato, arrives to shell the American Marines. Kusaka radios Kadomatsu from Umidori — now stowed in Yamato's hangar — to reveal his vision for a new country that is neither the militaristic empire of his time nor the defeated Japan of the future. He calls his ideal land Zipang. He reminds Kadomatsu that they are caught up in a war and that Japan cannot just withdraw from the fight without striking some blow at the Americans. In particular, Kusaka argues that, if the 1st U.S. Marine Division, a vital component in the American strategy in the Pacific, is wiped out on Guadalcanal before the Japanese withdraw, it will make it easier for Japan to arrange an honorable peace treaty with the United States — as a first step towards his vision. Kadomatsu refuses to consider this and calls Kusaka a murderous madman.
14	"Collision!"; Transliteration: "Gekitotsu!" (Japanese: 激突!)	January 6, 2005
The Yamato fires on the American forces on Guadalcanal, but the Mirai uses its Aegis combat system and Sea Sparrow missiles to intercept and destroy the first wave of shells in flight. However, the Mirai crew are aware that they cannot keep intercepting shells, as the Yamato has hundreds of shells to fire, while the Mirai is limited by both the technology and the supply of missiles. Lt. Commander Kikuchi suggests that, if Yamato were to keep firing its main battery, the only way the Mirai can stop the shelling would be to disable the Yamato itself. After tense several minutes during which the Mirai aims its missiles at the Yamato, Admiral Yamamoto agrees to withdraw his battleships and evacuate Japanese personnel from Guadalcanal. In the meantime, Lt. Tsuda prepares to commit Seppuku with his Dirk (since he heard that the Mirai has intercepted the Yamato's rounds, viewing it as a battle and viewing himself already as a prisoner of war), as the Mirai's female medical officer Lt. Momoi came his room to serve him coffee.
15	"The Living and the Dead"; Transliteration: "Shōja to Shisha" (Japanese: 生者と死者)	January 13, 2005
On Kusaka's advice, Yamamoto calls off the attack and orders the withdrawal from Guadalcanal to begin. As Lt. Tsuda worries about himself committing suicide and calling himself a "pathetic man", Lt. Momoi calms him down, preventing him committing suicide by stating that there is no problem for being a pathetic man and that he is better than those who do not value human lives, then embracing him, making Tsuda drop his Dirk and faint. While trying to reach their helicopter for extraction, the Mirai's landing party is forced into close combat with an American Marine patrol. They kill all the eight Marines, but the taking of other human lives leaves them in shock. It is especially hard on Kadomatsu.
16	"The Will of Lieutenant Okamura"; Transliteration: "Okamura Shōsa no Ishi" (Japanese: 岡村少佐の意志)	January 20, 2005
The Mirai landing party assists in the evacuation of the Japanese engineers from Guadalcanal. Kadomatsu goes into the jungle alone to look for stragglers. He encounters Lieutenant Commander Okamura (who is identified as a major in the fan-dubbed version and as a lieutenant in the official Geneon version, but as a member of Japanese Navy ground forces, he would be correctly ranked at a lieutenant commander). Okamura displays admirable bravery and dedication by staying behind to look for the rest of his men scattered in the jungle.
17	"Zipang Initiation"; Transliteration: "Jipangu Taidō" (Japanese: ジパング胎動)	January 27, 2005
The Mirai enters the Japanese naval base at Truk Island under Admiral Yamamoto's sponsorship and the crew looks forward to a shore leave. The Army and the Navy disagree about the operation to recapture Guadalcanal and a delegation from the Army insists that the battle for Guadalcanal resume, with an elite army regiment under Colonel Kiyonao Ichiki, en route from Guam, leading the way. After the meeting with the army officers, Admiral Yamamoto flies into rage and orders his staff to devise a plan that could convince Mirai's crew to join his cause, saying that the ship is essential for avoiding needless sacrifices. Captain Umezu meets Admiral Yamamoto who suggests that the Mirai base itself at Yokosuka, its home port in the 21st century, so that the presence of both the ship and its crew can help change the minds of the contemporary Japanese and make them amenable to accepting an early peace with the Americans. Lt. Col. Masanobu Tsuji, the head of the army delegation visiting Truk, has been tipped off of the secret meeting and attempts to interrupt it, but Kusaka stops him at the last minute. He takes Tsuji at gunpoint to the harbor and shows the Mirai. Kusaka then asks for Tsuji's help so that he can leave for Japan and meet retired general Kanji Ishiwara, whom he calls the "man who started the war" (presumably on the account of his role in the Manchurian Incident).
18	"The Reunion"; Transliteration: "Saikai" (Japanese: 再会)	February 3, 2005
Kadomatsu learns that the operations on Guadalcanal are to resume — under an imperial decree — and blames Kusaka for this development. He goes ashore with Lt. Tsuda to talk to Kusaka — and is shocked to see him in a car heading towards the airfield with Lt. Colonel Tsuji. Kadomatsu tries to stop Kusaka but fails. As Mirai prepares to sail to Yokosouka, Lt. Commander Taki, a naval staff officer, plots with Admiral Matome Ugaki, the Combined Fleet Chief of Staff and a hardliner in the navy, to destroy the Mirai by arranging to have radio messages about her movements transmitted in a code that they know has been cracked by the Americans — so that it would be destroyed by an American, rather than Japanese, attack. Taki remarks that he is working under orders from someone high in the Japanese naval command, whose identity he cannot reveal. Kusaka meets General Kanji Ishiwara, a famous army officer who is out of office for criticizing Prime Minister Hideki Tojo and the war, at a lecture that the general gives at the Ritsumeikan University in Kyoto.
19	"The Other Staff Headquarters"; Transliteration: "Mō Hitotsu no Sanbōhonbu" (Japanese: もうひとつの参謀本部)	February 10, 2005
When some of the Combined Fleet staff (specifically Admiral Ugaki) balk at the idea of sending badly needed destroyers to escort the Mirai, Lt. Commander Taki proposes that a new submarine, the I-21, be sent instead, with himself on board to observe. Yamamoto reminds Taki that he is essentially protecting Japan's future — and without Japan, there is no navy. However, Taki retorts — silently — that without the navy, there can be no Japan. In Japan, Kusaka and General Ishiwara develop a plan to create Kusaka's vision of Zipang, an undefeated Japan, with its economic heartland in Japanese-dominated Manchuria. Specifically, Kusaka reveals the 1959 oil strike at Daqing, Heilongjiang Province, in Manchuria, which could supply many times Japan's needs for decades. Ishiwara is astonished and agrees that this single piece of information could change everything about Japan's future and that the first thing they have to ensure is to create a coalition uniting bickering Japanese factions — the army and the navy as well as business interests — behind their vision of the future. In the meantime, Commander Hutton (again, referred to as a "Lieutenant Commander" or "Lieutenant" in English dubbed versions, despite his rank being correctly identified in Japanese), the leader of an elite U.S. Navy bomber squadron unexpectedly summoned to board the carrier USS Wasp as a part of a 10-ship task force engaged in some secret mission, plays poker at a bar in Townsville, Australia, with his old friend, Commander Chris Evans. Evans is the captain of the USS Guardfish, the U.S. submarine that encountered the Mirai shortly after its arrival from the future. Commander Evans tells Hutton about the Japanese warship with unbelievable capabilities — such as a flying torpedo capable of tracking its target. As Commander Hutton and his crew arrive on board the USS Wasp, the commander of the task force, Admiral Noyes remarks that Commander Hutton has never lost anyone under his command in battle so far. After being briefed on his mission, Commander Hutton responds angrily to Captain Gray, the commanding officer of the Wasp, when he is not given the specifics about the target his men are to attack — and is subsequently informed of the events on Guadalcanal from the episode Arrow of Sagittarius. In Japan, Lt. Tsuda meets General Ishiwara to find out where Lt. Commander Kusaka is — and the General reveals Kusaka's whereabouts under one condition, that Tsuda help him arrange a meeting with retired Admiral and former prime minister Yonai Mitsumasa.
20	"Submarine I-21"; Transliteration: "I 21-gō" (Japanese: 伊-21号)	February 17, 2005
Kadomatsu goes to the I-21 to consult about an approaching scout plane the Mirai has detected. Taki takes Kadomatsu prisoner and the I-21 submerges, leaving the Mirai's crew confused and unsure about what to do as time runs out. The mystery plane is indeed American, but Mirai uses its ECM system to jam the radio waves and prevent the pilot from reporting back. Nevertheless, Commander Hutton correctly suspects that a distortion field that suddenly appeared on USS Wasp's radarscope is the work of the mysterious Japanese warship and recommends an attack. The episode ends as the USS Wasp launches a massive air strike against the Mirai.
21	"One versus Forty"; Transliteration: "1 tai 40" (Japanese: 1対40)	February 24, 2005
On board the I-21, Kadomatsu tries to get a warning to the Mirai via Morse code but is stopped by Taki. At first, Mirai attempts to leave the scene, rather than stand and fight, but Taki forces the issue by ordering the I-21 to surface so that it would be left vulnerable to an air attack. Rather than leave I-21 to be attacked by the Americans, Captain Umezu decides to stay around and face the attack. Oguri thinks they should engage the Americans afar, taking advantage of their technological advantage, but Kikuchi argues that they should wait until the range closes, since the supply of the long range Standard missiles is limited. In fact, Kikuchi thinks he can spare lives by demonstrating Mirai's firepower to destroy only a fraction of the American strike force, so that the rest would be frightened away. The strike force from the USS Wasp finds the destroyer. Using its advanced weapons, the Mirai shoots down two-thirds of the American aircraft in less than a minute. However, although the Americans are shocked, they don't slacken their attack, leaving the Mirai's crew dumbfounded. Commander Hutton, in particular, presses his attack by diving his plane into the bridge of the ship from the future (though bailing out at the last second so it is not suicide). The Mirai is damaged and suffers numerous casualties.
22	"Warning"; Transliteration: "Keikoku" (Japanese: 警告)	March 3, 2005
The JDS Mirai monitors radio traffic indicating that the Wasp is preparing a second strike. Since the radar and the main cannon are damaged, Gunnery Officer Kikuchi recommends launching a Tomahawk missile to destroy the Wasp rather than wait for the second wave to strike. Lt. Commander Oguri suggests instead that a Harpoon missile be used instead to damage the flight deck instead. Kikuchi counters, however, that during the Battle of Coral Sea, USS Yorktown (CV-5) was back in operation only after three hours' repairs after a similar damage, and besides, since JDS Mirai came back in time, Allied forces have constantly seen it as an enemy and sought to destroy it, Mirai can't run forever and hold back punches if its crew are to survive. Captain Umezu agrees but first sends a warning to the Wasp and orders that the Tomahawk be self-destructed if the American ship calls off the second attack. Unfortunately, the American Admiral Noyes believes the warning is a bluff. The I-21 observes the launch of the Tomahawk and Kadomatsu lays the blame for the upcoming loss of lives on Taki, which makes an impression on Capt. Shimamoto, the submarine's commander. It is revealed that, just two months before they were to graduate from the Maritime Defense Academy, the Persian Gulf War broke out and the prospect of Japan sending warships in support of American operations against Iraq was raised. Kikuchi decided to drop out rather than risk the possibility of being involved in killing — which led to Kadomatsu and Oguri coming to blows. Kikuchi decided to stay in the SDF only for the sake of their friendship.
23	"Sinking the Wasp"; Transliteration: "Wasupu Gekichin" (Japanese: ワスプ撃沈)	March 10, 2005
The Tomahawk missile hits the Wasp. Its explosion and resulting secondary explosions from the carrier's munitions and armed aircraft destroy the ship and it sinks with heavy casualties, leaving Admiral Noyes and Captain Gray dumbfounded as they join the survivors on board lifeboats. On the opposite side, Gunnery Officer Kikuchi is racked with guilt over his decision, even though he still believes it the only acceptable option. On the I-21, Lt. Commander Taki wants to launch torpedoes to sink the Mirai, but Kadomatsu says the sub will have to surface to make the attack, since its batteries are nearly dead from following the destroyer at high speed submerged. Surfacing will make it vulnerable to retaliation. Captain Shimamoto, the submarine's commander, supports Kadomatsu's statement, even though it is not really true. Afterward, Captain Shimamoto tells Kadomatsu that Captain Umezu's decision to stay behind and needlessly endanger his ship and men was foolish, but that he admires his humanism regardless. Taki is ordered to abort his mission and report back to Japan, but warns Kadomatsu that he will not find safety in Japan as they are many like him who wish to see the Mirai stopped.
24	"The Dead and the Alive"; Transliteration: "Shisha to Shōja" (Japanese: 死者と生者)	March 17, 2005
Following the previous episodes' events, people on all sides are having hard time coping with what has so far transpired. On a U.S. destroyer carrying the survivors of the battle against the Mirai, Commander Hutton is a drunken wreck, seized by the nightmares of the battle and melancholy over the many subordinates he lost. On the Mirai, the crew is also coping with the shock of the battle and loss of their comrades — to the point that Gunnery Officer Kikuchi had to be sedated. On Guadalcanal, where the Ichiki detachment has just been wiped out, Lt. Commander Okamura is tending to a group of tattered Japanese survivors. The survivors include a very dejected Lt. Colonel Tsuji. Okamura convinces Tsuji that he must report to the Imperial GHQ about the difficulties that the Japanese troops are facing on Guadalcanal and urge a prompt and total evacuation to save the lives of thousands. In Tokyo, General Ishiwara meets Admiral Yonai for a hot-pot lunch at the famous Dozeu Restaurant, near the Tokyo Train Station. Yonai, to surprise of Ishiwara, remarks that Mirai must be destroyed for the sake of Japan's future.
25	"Coming Home"; Transliteration: "Kikan" (Japanese: 帰還)	March 24, 2005
Upon "returning" to Yokosuka, the crew of Mirai find that the navy has arranged to have them dock away from the harbor, under the guns of a naval artillery battery. Feeling suspicious, Mirai contacts the Yokosuka Naval Base to demand that someone with real authority be sent to negotiate the conditions of their stay. The navy brass are divided over what to do, but Admiral Yonai enters the conference room to volunteer himself as the envoy and goes to Mirai alone. On board the Mirai, Yonai remarks to Captain Umezu and Kadomatsu that he'd rather see Mirai reduced to a pile of scrap metal. He reminds them that they are not of this era and that it is best that Japan lose the war to awaken her people from the allure of imperialism and militarism. Even if the defeat costs lives of millions, it is necessary to shock the Japanese people into rejecting the military dictatorship so that Japan could prosper for the next 100 years. Yonai suggests that the crew of Mirai should seek to preserve their lives so that they can help rebuild the postwar Japan, not involve themselves needlessly in changing the course of the war, even for the sake of saving lives. Kadomatsu has trouble accepting this line of argument. Meantime, the car carrying Lt. Commander Taki and another naval officer runs over a young boy near the harbor. At the same time, Lt. Tsuda meets Lt. Commander Kusaka at the Hotel New Grand in Yokohama, where the latter reveals his plans for 'Zipang' and announces that he will be soon leaving for Manchuria.
26	"The Place of Return"; Transliteration: "Modoru beki to koro" (Japanese: 戻るべきところ)	March 31, 2005
Having been granted a shore leave by the Japanese Navy, Kadomatsu goes to his father's home town in Tokyo's Fukugawa district to find him and unburden himself of old family ghosts — his father and grandfather had an extremely uneasy relationship. However, he finds out to his shock that his father, as an 8-year-old in this era, was hit by a car (carrying Lt. Commander Taki) and died three days before. Stunned, Kadomatsu finally accepts that Japan of this time is not the Japan of his future and decides to hunt down Kusaka, who is actively changing the past. He visits former Prime Minister Yonai with his new resolve and learns that Kusaka is most likely heading to Xinjing, Manchuria, seeking to fulfill his and General Ishiwara's dream of using Manchuria as the economic heartland of a powerful undefeated Japanese Empire. Admiral Yonai offers to arrange contact with his colleagues in Shanghai who might be able to help, but Kirin is far away from Shanghai. Kadomatsu returns to Mirai to inform the captain of his decision to leave the ship to pursue Kusaka on the Asian mainland and learns that the navy has agreed to provide Mirai with supplies on the condition that her crew submit to the Imperial Navy command and help them with strategic planning for the war, among other things. The crew has finally accepted that the only way to survive in this era is to cast their lot with the Japanese Empire after all. However, in case the navy might attempt to take over the ship against their will, the crew has rigged the ship with explosives. In the meantime, Lt. Commander Kusaka is heading to Manchuria in a train under an assumed name, Wang To-Hai (王拓海) (To-hai is "Takumi" in Chinese pronunciation), disguised as a Chinese. The series ends in a cliffhanger: the future fate of the Mirai remains as uncertain as ever. Kadomatsu arrives at Shanghai, starting his search for Kusaka in China. Kusaka is engaged in his own schemes in China as he seeks to change the course of the war.

==== DVD release ====
Zipang was licensed for release in North America by Geneon Entertainment with DVD release starting in September 2006.

- Screen Ratio: Widescreen 1.85:1 Color (Anamorphic)
- Layers: Single Side, Single Layer
- Release Date: September 5, 2006
- Subtitles: English
- Packaging: Keep case
- Audio Tracks: ENGLISH: Dolby Digital Stereo and JAPANESE: Dolby Digital Stereo

=== Video game ===
A video game version of Zipang for PlayStation 2 was released by Bandai in Japan on May 26, 2005.

== Reception ==
Zipang won the 26th Kodansha Manga Award for general manga category in 2002.

Some foreign readers and viewers were uncomfortable with the storyline. There were many arguments among the South Korean critics that the series was promoting Imperial Japan.

== See also ==
- The Final Countdown, a 1980 American film similar in premise to Zipang, in which the USS Nimitz is brought back in time to before the attack on Pearl Harbor
- G.I. Samurai
- Axis of Time
- The Cockpit
