= Kūbo Ibuki =

Japanese manga series

- First tankōbon volume cover

空母いぶき
- Genre: Military
- Manga
- Written by: Kaiji Kawaguchi
- Published by: Shogakukan
- Magazine: Big Comic
- Original run: December 10, 2014 – December 10, 2019
- Volumes: 13
- Live-action film
- Directed by: Setsurō Wakamatsu
- Written by: Kazunori Itō; Yasuo Hasegawa
- Music by: Taro Iwashiro
- Studio: Kino Films; Kinoshita Group
- Released: May 24, 2019
- Runtime: 134 minutes
- Manga

Kūbo Ibuki Great Game
- Written by: Kaiji Kawaguchi
- Published by: Shogakukan
- Magazine: Big Comic
- Original run: December 25, 2019 – December 25, 2025
- Volumes: 18
- Manga

Kūbo Ibuki Chokepoint
- Written by: Kaiji Kawaguchi
- Published by: Shogakukan
- Magazine: Big Comic
- Original run: April 24, 2026 – present
- icon

Kūbo Ibuki (空母いぶき; lit. 'Aircraft Carrier Ibuki') is a Japanese manga series written and illustrated by Kaiji Kawaguchi, with cooperation by journalist Osamu Eya. It was serialized in Shogakukan's seinen manga magazine Big Comic from December 2014 to December 2019. A sequel, titled Kūbo Ibuki Great Game, was serialized in the same magazine from December 2019 to December 2025. A third series, Kūbo Ibuki Chokepoint, started in April 2026. A live-action film adaptation premiered in Japan in May 2019.

By October 2022, the manga had over 8 million copies in circulation. In 2018, Kūbo Ibuki won the 63rd Shogakukan Manga Award in the general category.

== Plot ==
In October 20XX, an agent, who is believed to have disguised himself as a shipwrecked person during a storm, landed on Minamikojima Island in the Senkaku Islands, saying, This island is an inherent territory of China, and we are trying to avoid ships from mainland China. The Chinese Landing Incident on the Senkaku Islands, which claims to wait, has occurred. Furthermore, the situation escalated with a collision between a Chinese Coast Guard vessel attempting to invade Japan's territorial waters and a Japan Coast Guard patrol vessel, and warning shots being fired at an escort vessel dispatched for investigation purposes, and the Japanese government half-yielded to China. Although he tried to settle the situation, the Prime Minister felt a sense of crisis about China's actions, and at the same time decided to bring forward the "Pegasus Plan", which consists of commissioning a new type of escort ship and establishing a new escort group with that ship as the flagship. do. One year after the incident, the SDF's first aircraft carrier, Ibuki was completed. Captain Ryuta Akitsu, who has an unusual career as a former Air Self-Defense Force ace pilot, is appointed as the captain, and Toshiya Shinba is selected as the deputy commander and chief navigator.

In April 20XY, while the IBUKI was on a training voyage off the coast of Minamitorishima, the Chinese military launched the "Shuguang Project" and suddenly began to invade Japan. The Chinese army took control of the Sakishima Islands and the Senkaku Islands, causing the first deaths in the postwar period. Under the command of Keiichiro Tarumi, the first defense dispatch in history was ordered. Began to fear that a war might break out in my country. The Ibuki fleet, which was in training, rushes to the scene, but the Chinese military also sent the North Sea fleet, centered on the new aircraft carrier "Guangdong", to the Sakishima Islands. Negotiations with the Chinese government, which had begun to move, broke down, and finally the territorial recapture operation "Hayabusa" was launched by force.

== Media ==
=== Manga ===
Written and illustrated by Kaiji Kawaguchi, with cooperation by journalist Osamu Eya, Kūbo Ibuki was serialized in Shogakukan's seinen manga magazine Big Comic from December 10, 2014, to December 10, 2019. Shogakukan has collected its chapters into thirteen tankōbon volumes, released from September 30, 2015, to June 30, 2020.

A direct sequel, titled Kūbo Ibuki Great Game (空母いぶきGreat Game, Kūbo Ibuki Gurēto Gēmu), was serialized in Big Comic from December 25, 2019, to December 25, 2025. Shogakukan collected its chapters in 18 tankōbon volumes, released from June 30, 2020, to January 30, 2026.

A third series, titled Kūbo Ibuki Chokepoint (空母いぶき Chokepoint, Kūbo Ibuki Chōkupointo), started in Big Comic on April 24, 2026.

==== Kūbo Ibuki ====
No.	Japanese release date	Japanese ISBN
1	September 30, 2015	978-4-09-187210-4
2	September 30, 2015	978-4-09-187214-2
3	January 29, 2016	978-4-09-187439-9
4	June 24, 2016	978-4-09-128096-1
5	October 28, 2016	978-4-09-189223-2
6	February 28, 2017	978-4-09-189383-3
7	July 28, 2017	978-4-09-189615-5
8	November 30, 2017	978-4-09-189696-4
9	March 30, 2018	978-4-09-189823-4
10	July 30, 2018	978-4-09-860054-0
11	December 27, 2018	978-4-09-860159-2
12	April 26, 2019	978-4-09-860306-0
13	June 30, 2020	978-4-09-860645-0

==== Kūbo Ibuki Great Game ====
No.	Japanese release date	Japanese ISBN
1	June 30, 2020	978-4-09-860637-5
2	October 30, 2020	978-4-09-860718-1
3	January 29, 2021	978-4-09-860842-3
4	May 28, 2021	978-4-09-861054-9
5	September 30, 2021	978-4-09-861161-4
6	January 28, 2022	978-4-09-861241-3
7	May 30, 2022	978-4-09-861346-5
8	September 30, 2022	978-4-09-861420-2
9	January 30, 2023	978-4-09-861572-8
10	May 30, 2023	978-4-09-861715-9
11	September 28, 2023	978-4-09-862528-4
12	January 30, 2024	978-4-09-862686-1
13	May 30, 2024	978-4-09-862805-6
14	September 30, 2024	978-4-09-863039-4
15	January 30, 2025	978-4-09-863182-7
16	May 30, 2025	978-4-09-863431-6
17	September 30, 2025	978-4-09-863564-1
18	January 30, 2026	978-4-09-863767-6

=== Live-action film ===
A live-action film adaptation of the manga was released in Japan on May 24, 2019. The film stars Hidetoshi Nishijima as Ryōta Akitsu and Kuranosuke Sasaki as Toshiya Niinami. The film is directed by Setsurō Wakamatsu, with scripts by Kazunori Itō and Yasuo Hasegawa and planning by Harutoshi Fukui.

==== Cast ====
- Hidetoshi Nishijima as Ryuta Akitsu
- Kuranosuke Sasaki as Shinba
- Tatsuya Fuji as Keiji Wakui
- Jun Murakami as Kazuhisa Nakane
- Shigeyuki Totsugi as Fuchikami
- Hiroshi Tamaki as Nariaki Seto
- Katsuhiko Sasaki as Tadamasa Oki
- Eisaku Yoshida as Yūsaku Sawazaki
- Yuki Saito as Keiko Sarashiya
- Tsubasa Honda as Yuko Honoda
- Kiichi Nakai as Keiichi Nakano
- Kōichi Satō as PM Keiichirō Tarumi

== Reception ==
By December 2018, the Kūbo Ibuki manga had over 4 million copies in circulation. By October 2022, the manga had over 8 million copies in circulation.

In 2018, alongside After the Rain, Kūbo Ibuki won the 63rd Shogakukan Manga Award in the general category. The manga ranked 18th on the 2019 "Book of the Year" list by Da Vinci magazine.

As of June 2019, the Kūbo Ibuki live-action film grossed ¥931,625,500 ($8.58 million). The film opened at second at the Japanese box office and earned ¥332,068,500 ($3.07 million) over its first three days. The film dropped to third in its second weekend, and earned ¥148,651,000 ($1.37 million) over the second weekend. The film dropped to fourth in its third weekend, and earned ¥82,234,500 ($757,900) from June 7–9, 2019.
