= Jū: Ninpō Makai Tenshō =

Japanese manga series

- First tankōbon volume cover

十～忍法魔界転生～
- Genre: Drama; Historical
- Manga
- Written by: Masaki Segawa
- Published by: Kodansha
- Magazine: Monthly Young Magazine
- Original run: August 8, 2012 – June 20, 2018
- Volumes: 13

Jū: Ninpō Makai Tenshō (Japanese: 十～忍法魔界転生～) is a Japanese manga series by Masaki Segawa, adapted from the novel Makai Tenshō by Futaro Yamada. It was serialized in Kodansha's seinen manga magazine Monthly Young Magazine from August 2012 to June 2018, with its chapters collected in thirteen tankōbon volumes.

== Publication ==
The manga was serialized in Kodansha's Monthly Young Magazine from August 8, 2012, to June 20, 2018. Kodansha collected its chapters in thirteen tankōbon volumes, released from February 6, 2013, to August 6, 2018.

=== Volumes ===
No.	Release date	ISBN
1	February 6, 2013	978-4-06-382268-7
2	May 23, 2013	978-4-06-382301-1
3	October 4, 2013	978-4-06-382365-3
4	March 6, 2014	978-4-06-382441-4
5	September 5, 2014	978-4-06-382515-2
6	February 6, 2015	978-4-06-382556-5
7	August 6, 2015	978-4-06-382652-4
8	February 5, 2016	978-4-06-382737-8
9	August 5, 2016	978-4-06-382834-4
10	February 6, 2017	978-4-06-382924-2
11	August 4, 2017	978-4-06-510089-9
12	February 6, 2018	978-4-06-510893-2
13	August 6, 2018	978-4-06-512437-6

== Reception ==
The series was acclaimed by authors Tow Ubukata, Yusuke Kishi, and Kinoko Nasu, with their comments featured on the obi of the first volume.

== See also ==
- Basilisk, another manga series by the same author
- Eye of the Dog, Jyuzo, another manga series by the same author
