= The Kouga Ninja Scrolls =

1958–1959 historical fantasy novel by Futaro Yamada

- First edition cover
- Author: Futaro Yamada
- Original title: 甲賀忍法帖
- Translator: Geoff Sant
- Language: Japanese
- Series: Ninja Scrolls
- Genre: Historical fantasy
- Publisher: Kobunsha
- Publication date: 1959
- Publication place: Japan
- English publication date: December 2006
- Media type: Print
- Pages: 311
- ISBN: 978-0-345-49510-5
- OCLC: 70408092
- Dewey Decimal: 895.6/35 22
- LC Class: PL865.A49 K6513 2006

The Kouga Ninja Scrolls (Japanese: 甲賀忍法帖, Hepburn: Kōga Ninpōchō) is a historical fantasy novel about ninja written in 1958–1959 by the Japanese author Futaro Yamada. It is the first installment in Yamada's Ninja Scrolls series, which he wrote until his death in 2001. The book was translated into English by Geoff Sant, and published by Del Rey in December 2006.

== Plot ==
Beginning in April 1614 Japan, the story centers around the Kouga and the Iga, two rival ninja clans who have been enemies for 400 years. Their no-hostilities treaty is lifted by retired shogun Tokugawa Ieyasu to settle a succession dispute within the government concerning which of Ieyasu's grandsons will become the third Tokugawa Shogun, Takechiyo or Kunichiyo. Danjou and Ogen, leader of the Kouga and Iga respectively, are summoned to Sunpu Castle and each select nine other members of their clan to participate in a battle to the death. Each clan is given a scroll with all 20 combatants' names written on it. Any survivors are to return to the castle on the last day of May with the scroll, and the side with the most survivors will win. Following a random toss of the scrolls by Ieyasu, Kunichiyo is represented by the Kouga, while Takechiyo is represented by the Iga.

Due to years of incestuous selective breeding, the members of the Kouga and Iga have all developed inhuman abilities at the cost of several of them being born physically disfigured or otherwise abnormally mutated. At the center of the conflict is Kouga and Iga's two young heirs; Gennosuke and Oboro respectively; who had fallen in love in the hopes of not only bringing their clans together in peace but also to mix the bloodlines of their families so as to undo the genetic damage endured by both. The novel traces the course of the conflict as both clans endure heavy losses and ultimately bring Gennosuke and Oboro to face each other on the field of battle.

== Characters ==
Kouga

- Kouga Danjou (甲賀 弾正, Kōga Danjō) is the elderly leader of the Kouga ninja clan. As a young man, he was in love with Ogen of the Iga.
- Kouga Gennosuke (甲賀 弦之介, Kōga Gennosuke) is the grandson of Danjou, and heir to take over the Kouga clan. His "basilisk eyes" force those who attack him to attack themselves instead. He is in love with Oboro of the Iga clan.
- Jimushi Juubei (地虫 十兵衛, Jimushi Jūbee) has gray skin, an ox-like face with big ears, and lacks both arms and legs. He can predict the future using astrology, and keeps a spear hidden in his esophagus, that he spits out to attack.
- Kazamachi Shougen (風待 将監, Kazamachi Shōgen) is a hunchback with gray skin, red eyes, and long appendages. He has the dexterity and abilities of a spider, such as weaving a sticky web.
- Kasumi Gyoubu (霞 刑部, Kasumi Gyōbu) is bald and completely hairless, resembling a monk. His gelatinous and transparent body can completely blend into any solid surface.
- Udono Jousuke (鵜殿 丈助, Udono Jōsuke) is extremely fat, with a barrel-like body and droopy facial features. His body has the consistency of rubber; allowing him to bounce like a ball, or roll like a boulder. He is Gennosuke's personal retainer.
- Kisaragi Saemon (如月 左衛門) is so completely featureless, that most people can not remember what he looks like. He can take on the physical appearance of another person by creating death masks of mud, and impersonate their voice. He is the older brother of Okoi.
- Muroga Hyouma (室賀 豹馬, Muroga Hyōma) is Gennosuke's blind uncle and a high-ranking member of the Kouga. He also has basilisk eyes, but can only use them at night.
- Kagerou (陽炎, Kagerō) is a beautiful woman from a respected Kouga family, who is in love with Gennosuke. Her breath turns poisonous when she is sexually aroused.
- Okoi (お胡夷) is the teenage sister of Kisaragi Saemon. She can absorb someone's blood by making physical contact with them, and make her skin adhesive, like octopus suckers, to hold them to her.

Iga

- Ogen (お幻) is the elderly leader of the Iga ninja clan.
- Oboro (朧) is the granddaughter of Ogen, and heir to take over the Iga clan. Her "occult-piercing eyes" neutralize the techniques and abilities of anyone who meets her stare directly. She is in love with Gennosuke of the Kouga clan.
- Yashamaru (夜叉丸) is a handsome young man who fights with a black rope woven from the hair of young women and treated with animal oils, making it as strong as steel. He is in love with Hotarubi.
- Azuki Rousai (小豆 蠟斎, Azuki Rōsai) is a bearded old ninja who walks with his back parallel to the ground. He has strong physical attacks, but is also able to stretch and contort his limbs in fantastic ways due to having an infinite number of joints.
- Yakushiji Tenzen (薬師寺 天膳) is an immortal male ninja with feminine features and purple lips, who is a high-ranking member of the Iga.
- Amayo Jingorou (雨夜 陣五郎, Amayo Jingorō) is a master assassin who looks like a drowned corpse, with blue mold growing on his skin. By smearing himself with salt, he dissolves into a small semi-liquid form to slowly move in for the kill.
- Chikuma Koshirou (筑摩 小四郎, Chikuma Koshirō) is extremely loyal to Yakushiji Tenzen for raising him. By breathing in air through his mouth, he can create miniature whirlwinds that cut his opponents up, but also carries a huge two-handed scythe.
- Mino Nenki (蓑 念鬼) is a man with wild hair and thick fur all over his body. He can control his hair, such as turning it into needles, and uses a club in battle.
- Hotarubi (蛍火) is a woman who wears a snake coiled on-top her head like a headress. She can summon and control any insect or reptile. She is in love with Yashamaru.
- Akeginu (朱絹) is a beautiful woman with pale skin. She can secrete blood from her pores that she splatters to blind opponents or uses to create a mist which grants her cover to move and attack in stealth.

== Adaptations ==
- Kōga Ninpōchō (甲賀忍法帖; 1963), a manga by Haruo Koyama.
- Kōga Ninpōchō: Aratame (甲賀忍法帖・改; 2003), a manga by Torao Asada.
- Basilisk: The Kouga Ninja Scrolls (バジリスク 甲賀忍法帖, Bajirisuku Kōga Ninpōchō; 2003), a manga by Masaki Segawa, adapted into an anime television series by Gonzo in 2005.
- Shinobi: Heart Under Blade (忍, Shinobi; 2005), a film directed by Ten Shimoyama.
- Shinkun Genpōchō (神君幻法帖; 2009), a novel remake written by Masaki Yamada.
- Basilisk: The Ouka Ninja Scrolls (桜花忍法帖 バジリスク新章, Ōka Ninpōchō: Basilisk Shinshō; 2015), a sequel novel also written by Masaki Yamada, adapted into manga by Tatsuya Shihira in 2017 and into anime by Seven Arcs Pictures in 2018.

== Reception ==
PopMatters described The Kouga Ninja Scrolls as having "outrageous charm", and said they were captivated by the "covert vendettas and secret ninja powers". However, they called Sant's English translation "clunky and awkward".
