= Majokko Tsukune-chan =

Japanese manga series

- First tankōbon volume cover

魔女っ娘つくねちゃん
- Genre: Comedy
- Manga
- Written by: Hiroaki Magari
- Published by: Kodansha
- Magazine: Young Magazine Uppers
- Original run: April 2003 – October 2004
- Volumes: 2
- Manga

Majokko Tsukune-chan+
- Written by: Hiroaki Magari
- Published by: Kodansha
- Magazine: Monthly Shōnen Sirius
- Original run: June 2005 – March 2006
- Volumes: 1
- Original video animation
- Directed by: Hiroaki Sakurai
- Studio: Xebec
- Released: August 24, 2005 – January 25, 2006
- Runtime: 13 minutes
- Episodes: 6

Majokko Tsukune-chan (魔女っ娘つくねちゃん; "Little Witch Tsukune-chan") is a Japanese manga series written and illustrated by Hiroaki Magari. It was serialized in Kodansha's magazines Young Magazine Uppers from 2003 to 2004 and Monthly Shōnen Sirius (as Majokko Tsukune-chan+) from 2005 to 2006. It follows Tsukune, a skillful and powerful witch who rescues others from danger. It was adapted into a six-episode original video animation (OVA) series of 13 minutes each, animated by Xebec, released from August 2005 to January 2006.

== Premise ==
Majokko Tsukune-chan follows the cheerful and powerful young witch Tsukune (つくね), who goes around helping people and fighting against evil-doers; however, despite her good intentions, Tsukune ends up causing more problems than she solves.

== Media ==
=== Manga ===
Written and illustrated by Hiroaki Magari, Majokko Tsukune-chan was serialized in Kodansha's seinen manga magazine Young Magazine Uppers from April 2003 to October 2004, when the magazine ceased its publication. Kodansha collected its chapters in two tankōbon volumes, released on February 9 and December 9, 2004.

It was followed by a second series, Majokko Tsukune-chan+, which ran in Kodansha's shōnen manga magazine Monthly Shōnen Sirius from June 2005 to March 2006, Kodansha released a collected volume on March 23, 2006. Other stories were also published in Monthly Shōnen Sirius and its website from July 2006 to October 2008, a collected volume was released on December 22, 2008.

=== Original video animation ===
A six episode original video animation (OVA) series of 13 minute each, animated by Xebec, was released from August 24, 2005, to January 25, 2006. The opening theme is "Tsukune-chan no Flying Machine" (つくねちゃんのFlying Machine) and the ending theme is "Luminary", both performed by Tsukune's voice actress Haruko Momoi.
