= The Silent Service =

Japanese manga series by Kaiji Kawaguchi

- Cover of the first tankōbon volume, featuring Shiro Kaieda

沈黙の艦隊 (Chinmoku no Kantai)
- Genre: Alternate history; Military; Political thriller
- Manga
- Written by: Kaiji Kawaguchi
- Published by: Kodansha
- Imprint: Morning KC
- Magazine: Weekly Morning
- Original run: October 1988 – March 1996
- Volumes: 32
- Anime television film
- Directed by: Ryōsuke Takahashi
- Written by: Sōji Yoshikawa
- Music by: Akira Senju
- Studio: Sunrise
- Licensed by: NA: Central Park Media
- Original network: TBS
- Released: December 18, 1995
- Runtime: 100 minutes
- Original video animation
- Directed by: Ryōsuke Takahashi
- Written by: Sōji Yoshikawa
- Music by: Akira Senju
- Studio: Sunrise
- Released: September 25, 1997 – January 25, 1998
- Runtime: 60 minutes each
- Episodes: 2
- Live-action film
- Directed by: Kohei Yoshino
- Produced by: Takao Osawa; Shinzō Matsuhashi
- Written by: Hikaru Takai
- Music by: Yoshihiro Ike
- Studio: Credeus
- Licensed by: Amazon Prime Video
- Released: September 29, 2023
- Runtime: 113 minutes
- Live-action film

The Silent Service: The Battle of Arctic Ocean
- Directed by: Kohei Yoshino
- Produced by: Takao Osawa; Shinzō Matsuhashi
- Written by: Hikaru Takai
- Music by: Yoshihiro Ike
- Studio: Credeus
- Licensed by: Amazon Prime Video
- Released: September 26, 2026
- Runtime: 132 minutes
- icon

The Silent Service (Japanese: 沈黙の艦隊, Hepburn: Chinmoku no Kantai) is a Japanese manga series written and illustrated by Kaiji Kawaguchi. It was published in Kodansha's Weekly Morning magazine from October 1988 to March 1996 and collected in 32 tankōbon volumes.

The series was adapted into an anime television special and original video animation (OVA) series by Sunrise. The special was released in North America by Central Park Media. A live-action film adaptation premiered in Japanese theaters in September 2023 and a sequel, titled The Silent Service: The Battle of Arctic Ocean, premiered in September 2025.

In 1990, The Silent Service won the 14th Kodansha Manga Award for the general manga category. It has over 25 million copies in circulation, making it one of the best-selling manga series.

== Plot ==
Following the Cold War, the Japan Maritime Self-Defense Force has jointly and secretly with the United States Navy developed the most modern and powerful nuclear submarine, Seabat. Chosen as co-captain is Shiro Kaieda (the other co-captain is an American), while Seabat's crew is composed entirely of Kaieda's crew from his previous command. On Seabat's maiden voyage, Kaieda abruptly takes control of the submarine, renames it Yamato and declares it to be an independent state. Kaieda (whose ultimate aim is to use Yamato's capabilities to convince the world's nations to become one multination entity) and his crew intend to sail to Tokyo to form a formal alliance with Japan, and the United States Navy musters the entire 7th and 3rd Pacific fleets (including its most modern warships) to stop him. With the United States (led by President Bennett, who is determined to maintain the United States' militaristic supremacy) resolved to recover or sink Yamato by any means (even if it risks another war with Japan), the Japanese government divided as to how the events surrounding Yamato will determine Japan's fate, and both governments unsure as to whether or not Yamato is actually armed with nuclear missiles, Kaieda must use his submarining skills and unorthodox strategies to counter the sheer numbers and military might of the American Pacific fleets.

In the OVA episode "Voyage 2", Yamato enters Tokyo Bay and, despite initial unease about whether or not Yamato has nuclear capabilities, a special meeting is arranged between Kaieda and the Japanese government. Despite attempted interference by American ships trying to blockade the bay, the Southern Cross, a secret refitting ship disguised as an oil tanker, also enters Tokyo Bay under Japanese escort. At the meeting, which (as mutually agreed to by Kaieda and Japanese Prime Minister Takegami) is attended by the world press and televised live, a formal Treaty of Mutual Assistance is eventually concluded between Japan and Yamato. Additionally, Takegami proposes, and Kaieda agrees, to place both the Japanese forces and Yamato under the aegis of the United Nations and that Yamato should present itself at a special meeting of the United Nations Security Council. However, while Yamato is being repaired and reprovisioned inside the Southern Cross, President Bennett orders the American fleet to launch an attack on the Southern Cross before Yamato can depart, and refuses to halt the attack when Takegami protests. Fukamachi, who has been unsure of Kaieda's plans/motives and whose sub Tatsunami is part of the Japanese escort fleet (which under orders can only act defensively and not attack), must now protect Kaieda and Yamato.

In the OVA episode "Voyage 3", after escaping from the Tokyo Bay attack, Yamato begins its journey to New York, planning to travel underneath the Arctic Circle. However, President Bennett orders the implementation of "Operation Aurora", with the Seawolf class USS Alexander, a newly-constructed nuclear submarine with the same (or possibly superior) capabilities as Yamato commanded by John Alexander Bates, ordered to intercept and sink Yamato. Bennett persuades Russian President Malenkov to withdraw all Russian submarines from the area, with the U.S. doing the same, believing that Alexander's destroying Yamato will restore America's prestige and show its military/political superiority to the world. Following a period of cat-and-mouse, Yamato heads for a narrow underwater crevice; Alexander fires torpedoes after her, but Yamato successfully passes through. When Yamato's sonar detects a signature similar to Alexander ahead of them, Kaieda deduces that there is a second Seawolf - USS King, commanded by Bates' older brother Norman. Deducing that King is the greater threat, Kaieda orders an attack on Alexander and eventually tricks Alexander into firing a torpedo that misses Yamato but hits and sinks King, causing the sub's destruction by implosion. Yamato then engages in a game of "chicken" with Alexander and is victorious when Alexander, after suffering serious damage, is forced to surrender and surface, and Kaieda sends a message to the world announcing the attack on Yamato by the U.S. before continuing on to New York.

== Characters ==
Shiro Kaieda (海江田四郎, Kaieda Shiro)
Portrayed by: Masane Tsukayama (Japanese); B.H. O'Neill (English)
Former captain of the diesel submarine Yamanami, selected as captain of the first Japanese nuclear submarine, Seabat. During Seabat's test voyage with the U.S. Navy, he orders his crew to fire a sonar torpedo against the U.S. Navy submarines, disabling their sonar systems, and escapes from the area. Later, Kaieda declares that his submarine is an independent state and re-names it Yamato. His submariner skills, tactical abilities, practical psychological analyses of his opponents and political astuteness make him truly formidable. His crew trust him implicitly, and he trusts them equally.
Hiroshi Fukamachi (深町洋, Fukamachi Hiroshi)
Portrayed by: Akio Otsuka (Japanese); Maurizio Peppicelli (English)
CO of the Japanese Diesel submarine Tatsunami; friend and rival of Kaieda. Kaieda and Fukamachi graduated from the National Defense Academy of Japan in the same year, and both were candidates for command of the new nuclear submarine Seabat. Considered reckless and far more emotional while Kaieda is considered careful and methodical, he tries to figure out what Kaieda is up to and what his ultimate goal is.
Eiji Yamanaka (山中栄治, Yamanaka Eiji)
Portrayed by: Mugihito (Japanese); Frank Frankson (English)
Executive Officer of the Yamato; he has served with Kaieda for 10 years. The two trust each other's abilities.
Utsumi (内海)
Navigation Officer of the Yamato.
Takuo Migoguchi (溝口拓男, Migoguchi Takuo)
Portrayed by: Hiroshi Naka (Japanese); Nick Sullivan (English)
Sonar Specialist of the Yamato.
Captain David Ryan
Portrayed by: Kan Tokumaru (Japanese); Robert L. Gorman (English)
U.S. Navy representative aboard the Seabat. When Kaieda seizes control, he is taken prisoner and held aboard the Yamato, although Kaieda allows him to move about the sub unrestrained. When the Yamato arrives at Tokyo Bay, he is allowed to leave unmolested.
Prime Minister Takegami
Portrayed by: Osamu Saka (Japanese); Raul Bayone (English)
The current leader of the Japanese government. Originally perceived even by members of his own government as weak and indecisive, he is nevertheless highly intelligent, passionately devoted to peace and determined to not allow Japan to slip back into its past militaristic concepts. Even though the United States (and especially President Bennett) tries to bully him into conceding to their demands concerning Yamato, he still attends the meeting with Kaieda and signs the Mutual Assistance Treaty with him. He is also diplomatically aware and astute, particularly when he deliberately places Japan's military forces under the aegis of the United Nations (to which Kaieda also agrees). In response to political backlash about the Japan-Yamato Pact, he announces the dissolution of the National Diet in favor of a General Election, which he wins as leader of the New Japan Liberal Democratic Party, retaining the office of Prime Minister.
Admiral Steiger
Portrayed by: Chikao Ohtsuka (Japanese); Raul Bayone (English)
Commander of the United States Navy's Pacific Forces
President Nicholas J. Bennett
Portrayed by: Toshiya Ueda (Japanese); Robert Jones (English)
Current President of the United States; he is determined that the United States remain the dominant world power.

== Media ==
=== Manga ===
Written and illustrated by Kaiji Kawaguchi, The Silent Service began serialization in Kodansha's seinen manga magazine Weekly Morning in October 1988. (Note: Debuted in the magazine's forty-fourth issue of 1988, cover dated October 13.) It concluded serialization in March 1996. (Note: Finished in the magazine's thirteenth issue of 1996, cover dated March 14.) Kodansha compiled its individual chapters into thirty-two tankōbon volumes, published from December 15, 1989, to June 19, 1996.

=== Anime ===
The manga was first adapted as an anime television special by Sunrise, first released on video on December 18, 1995, and later broadcast on TBS on March 3, 1996. Two original video animation (OVA) episodes produced by Sunrise were released from September 25, 1997, to January 25, 1998.

In North America, Central Park Media's US Manga Corps dubbed the special, and released it on VHS on July 7, 1998. It was later released on DVD on January 9, 2001.

=== Video games ===
PlayStation
Silent Service, released by Kodansha, September 28, 2000.
Windows
Silent Service, released by SystemSoft Alpha, May 12, 2000.
Silent Service 2, released by SystemSoft Alpha, October 14, 2005.

=== Live-action adaptations ===
A live-action adaptation was announced on January 25, 2023. It is directed by Kohei Yoshino, with scripts written by Hikaru Takai, and Shinzō Matsuhashi and Takao Osawa serving as producers. Osawa played the lead role as Shiro Kaieda. The adaptation was released by Toho and premiered in Japanese theaters on September 29, 2023, and began streaming on Amazon Prime Video as an eight-part web series on February 9, 2024.

A second film, The Silent Service: The Battle of Arctic Ocean (沈黙の艦隊 北極海大海戦, Chinmoku no Kantai Hokkyoku-kai dai Kaisen), premiered in Japanese theaters on September 26, 2025. It began streaming internationally on Prime Video on March 20, 2026, as the first and only episode of the second season of the web series. A sequel series was announced on March 19, 2026, with filming having already begun. According to star and producer Takao Osawa, this sequel series will adapt the entire story of the manga until the end.

== Reception ==
The Silent Service won the 14th Kodansha Manga Award in the General manga category in 1990. The first 29 volumes sold over 22 million copies. It has sold over 25 million copies.

Some international readers and viewers were uncomfortable with the storyline. There were many arguments among international critics that the series promoted the idea of militarism. The manga was discussed in the Japanese Diet and was popular with the Self-Defense Force.

== Legacy ==
The Silent Service inspired the Korean movie Phantom: The Submarine (1999), especially, the story behind how the Republic of Korea Navy obtains a Sierra-class submarine and the scene where they use a communication buoy cable against the JMSDF submarine.
