= A Spirit of the Sun =

Japanese manga series by Kaiji Kawaguchi

- Cover of the first tankōbon volume

太陽の黙示録 (Taiyō no Mokushiroku)
- Manga
- Written by: Kaiji Kawaguchi
- Published by: Shogakukan
- Magazine: Big Comic
- Original run: 2002 – 2008
- Volumes: 17
- Anime television series
- Directed by: Masayuki Kojima
- Written by: Tatsuhiko Urahata
- Music by: Toshiyuki Honda
- Studio: Madhouse
- Licensed by: NA: Maiden Japan
- Original network: WOWOW
- Original run: September 17, 2006 – September 18, 2006
- Episodes: 2
- Manga

Foundation Chapter
- Written by: Kaiji Kawaguchi
- Published by: Shogakukan
- Magazine: Big Comic
- Original run: 2008 – 2010
- Volumes: 9
- icon

A Spirit of the Sun (Japanese: 太陽の黙示録, Hepburn: Taiyō no Mokushiroku; lit. 'Apocalypse of the Sun') is a Japanese manga series written and illustrated by Kaiji Kawaguchi. It is about a resourceful boy, Genichiro Ryu, as he survives a series of natural disasters and collapse of the economy in Japan set in the beginning of the 21st century. It was serialized in Shogakukan's Big Comic from 2002 to 2008.

It was followed by a second part, serialized in the same magazine from 2008 to 2010. The series was adapted into a 2-episode anime television special produced by Madhouse in 2006.

In 2006, A Spirit of The Sun received the 51st Shogakukan Manga Award for the General category. As well as the Grand Prize of the 10th Japan Media Arts Festival.

== Plot ==
In Japan, the series of earthquakes beginning on August 10, 2002, caused the explosion of Mount Fuji, and its consequences: a Japan, where half of the population has perished and whose main island, Honshū, is cut in two, and which must to survive appeal to the United States and China. Years later; two Japans coexist and many Japanese live as refugees in makeshift camps around the world. The south area is controlled by the United States, and the north area by China, with capitals in Fukuoka and Sapporo, respectively while Tokyo is under a UN mandate. Tensions go high in various Japanese refugee camps overseas between the residents of countries that wish to help them and those who promote kicking them off due to taking local jobs and wasting resources.

Genichiro Ryu, a survivor of the Japanese earthquakes, lost his memory and was subsequently adopted by a Taiwanese couple. He tries to find a way to help Japanese refugees in Taipei from being targeted by a growing xenophobic Taiwanese populace while trying to prevent his fellow Japanese from taking a hardline path of becoming terrorists, which was secretly backed by ultranationalist Taiwanese officials operating on an anti-refugee (and anti-Japanese) agenda. Genichiro later smuggles himself back to Japan in order to find out what happened to his family with the help of Chan, a Taiwanese gangster who he befriended and later said he would join. They are accompanied by Ryoutarou Hata aka Yui Liao Ming, a naturalized Taiwanese of Japanese origin and ex-Taipei City Police Department (TCPD) plainclothes officer (whose family was stranded in Taiwan after the earthquakes) who seeks to find out what's happening after Japan was divided. From there, the trio navigate the divided Japan as they fight conspiracies that seek to prevent parties from reuniting the two Japans.

== Media ==
=== Manga ===
A Spirit of the Sun, written and illustrated by Kaiji Kawaguchi, was serialized in Shogakukan's Big Comic from 2002 to 2008, with its chapters collected in seventeen tankōbon volumes, released from May 30, 2003, to February 29, 2008. A second part, A Spirit of the Sun 2: Foundation Chapter (太陽の黙示録 第2部 建国編, Taiyō no Mokushiroku Dainibu: Kenkoku-hen), was serialized in the same magazine from 2008 to 2010. Its chapters were collected in nine tankōbon volumes, released from June 30, 2008, to January 28, 2011.

==== Volume list ====
===== 1st part =====
No.	Japanese release date	Japanese ISBN
1	May 30, 2003	978-4-09-187031-5
2	May 30, 2003	978-4-09-187032-2
3	October 30, 2003	978-4-09-187033-9
4	February 28, 2004	978-4-09-187034-6
5	April 30, 2004	978-4-09-187035-3
6	August 30, 2004	978-4-09-187036-0
7	December 24, 2004	978-4-09-187037-7
8	April 26, 2005	978-4-09-187038-4
9	August 30, 2005	978-4-09-187039-1
10	December 26, 2005	978-4-09-187040-7
11	March 30, 2006	978-4-09-180220-0
12	July 28, 2006	978-4-09-180580-5
13	November 30, 2006	978-4-09-180816-5
14	February 28, 2007	978-4-09-181080-9
15	June 29, 2007	978-4-09-181258-2
16	October 30, 2007	978-4-09-181518-7
17	February 29, 2008	978-4-09-181764-8

===== 2nd part =====
No.	Japanese release date	Japanese ISBN
1	June 30, 2008	978-4-09-182018-1
2	October 30, 2008	978-4-09-182209-3
3	March 30, 2009	978-4-09-182416-5
4	August 28, 2009	978-4-09-182587-2
5	January 29, 2010	978-4-09-183009-8
6	June 30, 2010	978-4-09-183210-8
7	September 30, 2010	978-4-09-183417-1
8	December 25, 2010	978-4-09-183539-0
9	January 28, 2011	978-4-09-183639-7

=== Anime ===
Directed by Masayuki Kojima and written by Tatsuhiko Urahata, Madhouse produced a 2-episode TV special adaptation of the manga, which was shown on WOWOW on September 17 and September 18, 2006. The ending theme is "The Power" performed by Kanon.

In North America, Maiden Japan licensed the anime in 2018.

== Reception ==
In 2006, A Spirit of The Sun, along with Rainbow: Nisha Rokubō no Shichinin by Masasumi Kakizaki and George Abe, received the 51st Shogakukan Manga Award for the General category. It also received the Grand Prize for the Manga Category at the 10th Japan Media Arts Festival in 2006.
