= Jushin Liger (TV series) =

Japanese television series

- 獣神ライガー
- Genre: Action, sci-fi
- Created by: Go Nagai
- Directed by: Norio Kashima
- Music by: Hiromoto Tobisawa
- Country of origin: Japan
- Original language: Japanese
- No. of episodes: 43

Production
- Producers: Makoto Imai (Nagoya TV); Youichi Honna (Tokyu Agency); Hironori Nakagawa (Sunrise)
- Production companies: Nagoya TV; Tokyu Agency; Sunrise

Original release
- Network: ANN (Nagoya TV, TV Asahi)
- Release: March 11, 1989 – January 27, 1990

Related
- Manga
- Written by: Go Nagai
- Published by: Kodansha
- Magazine: Comic Bom Bom
- Original run: March 1989 – January 1990
- Volumes: 2

Jushin Liger (獣神ライガー, Jūshin Raigā; lit. 'Beast God Liger', also sometimes romanized as Juushin Liger, Bio Armor Ryger, Jushin Riger, Jushin Ryger and some other variations) is an anime superhero TV series created by Go Nagai. Produced by Sunrise Inc. with cooperation of Dynamic Planning (Nagai's own company), the series was originally broadcast on Nagoya Broadcasting Network (NBN)/TV Asahi from March 11, 1989, to January 27, 1990, with a total of 43 episodes.

A manga series, written and drawn by Go Nagai, was also released alongside the anime, originally published by Kodansha in the magazine Comic Bom Bom from March 1989 to January 1990.

== Plot ==
Ken Taiga is a milquetoast 12-year-old 6th grader living in Hokkaido, Japan, in 199X AD who has a knack on flipping females' skirts and touching their breasts because he can be quite a pervert. In Kushiro, Hokkaido, the Drago Knights of the Dragon Empire attack. Possessing overwhelming destructive force, they attack the city to awaken their master, the devil god Jashin Drago from the Rock of Sealing he was trapped in. Two hundred years ago, Drago was trapped in the seal by a holy warrior with the tattooed mark of the Liger. Assuming that the warrior is dead, Drago and Empress Zara are free to conquer the Earth using their army of giant biomechanical beasts. Even the Japan Self-Defense Forces are no match for the Drago Knights' awesome power. One of the people fleeing is Ken Taiga himself. Unbeknownst to the Dragonites, Ken realizes that he is the descendant of the Lion Clan that once summoned Liger. In a burst of anger, Ken's Liger birthmark appears, and he rises his palm into the air, shouting the henshin (transforming) command, "LIGER!" which then covers him in demonic, long-haired biomechanical armor. Ken transforms into Jushin Liger to fight the evil forces of the Dragon Empire and its true purposes. With the forces of Goro Dan, his classmate, alongside Yui Kamishiro and Mai Kamishiro, the 12-year-old twin sisters who possess special powers and have the ability to summon Begaruda, and alongside the 22-year-old newscaster Saeko Yagami, his adventures with them boost up with the battles against the Dragon Empire. And with the power of Thunder Phoenix, Liger will soon become Thunder Liger. Soon afterwards, it is revealed that Ryu Dolk, who happened to be Ken's arch rival from the Dragon Empire was the Kamishiro twins' brother, and later helped Jushin Liger's new ultimate form as Agama eradicate the Dragon Empire and the boss once and for all.

== Characters ==
Ken Taiga (大牙剣, taiga ken)
Voiced by: Mayumi Tanaka

He is a sixth grader born in Hokkaido who has the power of the Bio Armor Liger.

Ryuzo Taiga (大牙龍造, taiga ryūzō)
Voiced by: Ritsuo Sawa

Ken's grandfather.

Yui Kamishiro (神代ゆい, kamishiro yui)
Voiced by: Naoko Matsui
Mai Kamishiro (神代まい, kamishiro mai)
Voiced by: Miki Itō
Saeko Yagami (八神冴子, yagami saeko)
Voiced by: Kayoko Fujii
Goro Dan (団五郎)
Voiced by: Kōzō Shioya
Mini-Knight (ミニナイト, mini naito)
Voiced by: Chie Kōjiro
Empress Zara (女帝ザーラ, nyotei zāra)
Voiced by: Mizuka Arima
Ryu Dolk (リュウ・ドルク, ryū doruku)
Voiced by: Kiyoyuki Yanada
Doll Satan (ドル・サタン, doru satan)
Voiced by: Masako Katsuki
Doll Command (ドル・コマンド, doru komando)
Voiced by: Bin Shimada
Doll Phantom (ドル・ファントム, doru fantomu)
Voiced by: Hidetoshi Nakamura
Doll Navy (ドル・ネイビー, doru neibī)
Voiced by: Kōji Totani

== Media ==
=== Anime ===
The opening theme "Ikari no Jushin" (怒りの獣神, ikari no jūshin; "Jushin's Rage"), which was performed by Yumi Hiroki, is also wrestler Jushin Thunder Liger's theme song. The song "Kiseki no Jushin" (奇跡の獣神, kiseki no jūshin; "Jushin's Miracle") was also used by Liger on occasion.

No.	Title	Written by	Original air date
1	"The Raging Bio Armor, Liger appears!" Transliteration: "Ikari no Baio Āmā Raigā tōjō!!" (Japanese: 怒りのバイオアーマーライガー登場!!)	Sho Aikawa	March 11, 1989
2	"Old enemy, Demon dragon king Doluga!!"; Transliteration: "Shukuteki, Maryūō Doruga!!" (Japanese: 宿敵、魔竜王ドルガ!!)	Yoshimasa Takahashi	March 18, 1989
3	"Be careful of Satan's shadow!!" Transliteration: "Satan no kage ni Ki wo tsukero!!" (Japanese: サタンの影に気をつけろ!!)	Toshiki Inoue	March 25, 1989
4	"Aim the flaming arrow, Liger!!"; Transliteration: "Raigā o nerau honō no ya!!" (Japanese: ライガーを狙う炎の矢!!)	Sho Aikawa	April 1, 1989
5	"Bare your fangs Doluga Dragon!!"; Transliteration: "Kiba o muku Doruga doragon!!" (Japanese: 牙をむくドルガ・ドラゴン!!)	Yoshiyuki Suga	April 8, 1989
6	"Break through Hell's Trap!!"; Transliteration: "Jigoku no Wana o Bucchigire!!" (Japanese: 地獄の罠をぶっちぎれ!!)	Yoshimasa Takahashi	April 15, 1989
7	"Grab the stone! Emperess Zaala's curse" Transliteration: "Iwa o tsukamu Nyotei Zāra no noroi" (Japanese: 岩をつかむ女帝ザーラの呪い)	Hiroyuki Kawasaki	April 22, 1989
8	"Swallow your tears! Shoot your friend!!" Transliteration: "Namida o koraete Tomo o ute!!" (Japanese: 涙をこらえて友を撃て!!)	Toshiki Inoue	April 29, 1989
9	"The rose's magic, The lion's smile" Transliteration: "Bara no majutsu Shishi no hohoemi" (Japanese: バラの魔術師死の微笑み)	Yoshiyuki Suga	May 6, 1989
10	"Farewell, Chiro! Sorrowful Demon Dragon Warrior"; Transliteration: "Saraba Chiro ... Kanashimi no Maryū Senshi" (Japanese: さらばチロ…哀しみの魔竜戦士)	Hiroyuki Kawasaki	May 20, 1989
11	"Rampant! Traitorous Doll Armi!"; Transliteration: "Bōsō! Hangyaku no Doru āmī" (Japanese: 暴走!反逆のドルアーミー)	Yoshimasa Takahashi	May 27, 1989
12	"Roar! The Angry Liger Slash"; Transliteration: "Hoero! Ikari no Raigā Surasshu" (Japanese: 吠えろ!怒りのライガースラッシュ)	Yoshimasa Takahashi	June 3, 1989
13	"The carefree Dragon Mini Knight appears!" Transliteration: "Nōtenki doragon mini naito tōjō!" (Japanese: のーてんきドラゴンミニナイト登場!)	Hiroyuki Kawasaki	June 10, 1989
14	"The New Demon General, Doll Commando"; Transliteration: "Ma no shin shōgun Doru Komando" (Japanese: 魔の新将軍ドルコマンド)	Yoshiyuki Suga	June 17, 1989
15	"The Girl who loved the Demon Dragon Warrior"; Transliteration: "Shōjo o aishita Maryū Senshi" (Japanese: 少女を愛した魔竜戦士)	Toshiki Inoue	June 24, 1989
16	"The god that abandoned our castle" Transliteration: "Kami ga nokoshita ore tachi no shiro" (Japanese: 神がのこした俺たちの城)	Yoshiyuki Suga	July 1, 1989
17	"Danger, Liger! The Pegasus shrieks" Transliteration: "Ayaushi Raigā Tenma o yobu sakebi" (Japanese: 危うしライガー天馬を呼ぶ叫び)	Yoshimasa Takahashi	July 8, 1989
18	"He's strong! Heavy Battle Horse Vegaruder!"; Transliteration: "Tsuyoi ze! Jūsen uma Begarūda!" (Japanese: 強いぜ!重戦馬ベガルーダ!)	Hiroyuki Kawasaki	July 15, 1989
19	"Yui and Mai's Mixed-up Battle!"; Transliteration: "Yui to Mai no hachamecha Batoru!" (Japanese: ゆいとまいのハチャメチャバトル!)	Toshiki Inoue	July 22, 1989
20	"Enraged Blade! The Wings of Friendship"; Transliteration: "Ikare ken! Yūjō no tsubasa" (Japanese: 怒れ剣!友情のつばさ)	Yoshiyuki Suga	July 29, 1989
21	"Mini Knight's favorite is Dragon Knight!"; Transliteration: "Mini naito no kōbutsu wa dorago naito!" (Japanese: ミニナイトの好物はドラゴナイト!)	Yoshimasa Takahashi	August 5, 1989
22	"The Fear of the Revived Legend"; Transliteration: "Yomigaeru densetsu no kyōfu" (Japanese: よみがえる伝説の恐怖)	Hiroyuki Kawasaki	August 12, 1989
23	"The Sailor Suit and Beast God Liger"; Transliteration: "Sērāfuku to Jūshin Raigā" (Japanese: セーラー服と獣神ライガー)	Toshiki Inoue	August 19, 1989
24	"Drago's blood calls out the Devil's tomb" Transliteration: "Dorago no chi o yobu akuma no seihai" (Japanese: ドラゴの血を呼ぶ悪魔の聖盃)	Yoshiyuki Suga	August 26, 1989
25	"Drago's fangs strike down!" Transliteration: "dorago no kiba o hikkonuke!" (Japanese: ドラゴの牙をひっこぬけ!)	Yoshimasa Takahashi	September 2, 1989
26	"Demon Dragon King Doluga Files to the South Pole!"; Transliteration: "Maryūō Doruga nankyoku nitobu!" (Japanese: 魔竜王ドルガ南極にとぶ!)	Yoshimasa Takahashi	September 9, 1989
27	"The girl who dances to the Death Melody"; Transliteration: "Shi no Merodī ni mau shōjo" (Japanese: 死のメロディーに舞う少女)	Hiroyuki Kawasaki	September 23, 1989
28	"Now, Stand up Thunder Liger!"; Transliteration: "Ima, tachi agaru Sandā Raigā!" (Japanese: 今、立ちあがるサンダーライガー!)	Hiroyuki Kawasaki	September 30, 1989
29	"Take down Metal Knight!"; Transliteration: "Metaru Naito o buttobase!" (Japanese: メタルナイトをぶっとばせ!)	Yoshiyuki Suga	October 7, 1989
30	"The Soldier that brings love" Transliteration: "Senshi ni sasageru ai" (Japanese: 戦士に捧げる愛)	Toshiki Inoue	October 14, 1989
31	"Fight! With our robot" Transliteration: "Tatakae! Ore tachi no robotto de" (Japanese: 戦え!俺たちのロボットで)	Yoshimasa Takahashi	October 21, 1989
32	"Ryu Doluc's meeting with fate" Transliteration: "Ryū doruku unmei no deai" (Japanese: リュウ・ドルク運命の出会い)	Hiroyuki Kawasaki	November 4, 1989
33	"Yui, Mai, Assassination Orders"; Transliteration: "yui, mai ansatsu shirei" (Japanese: ゆい、まい暗殺指令)	Yoshiyuki Suga	November 11, 1989
34	"Save Mai! Drago Empire's fight!" Transliteration: "Mai o sukue! Dorago teikoku no kessen" (Japanese: まいを救え!ドラゴ帝国の決戦)	Yoshimasa Takahashi	November 18, 1989
35	"Zaala's retaliation towards the traitors" Transliteration: "Zāra uragirimono e no hōfuku" (Japanese: ザーラ裏切者への報復)	Hiroyuki Kawasaki	November 25, 1989
36	"Doll Satan's love of flowing blood" Transliteration: "Doru Satan ryūketsu no ai" (Japanese: ドルサタン流血の愛)	Toshiki Inoue	December 2, 1989
37	"Drago's curse of the demonic Triangle Zone"; Transliteration: "Dorago no noroi ma no sankaku chitai" (Japanese: ドラゴの呪い魔の三角地帯)	Yoshiyuki Suga	December 9, 1989
38	"Two Yuis!? Mai's courage" Transliteration: "Futari no Yui!? Mai no yūki" (Japanese: 二人のゆい!?まいの勇気)	Yoshimasa Takahashi	December 16, 1989
39	"Yui's sad decision" Transliteration: "Yui no kanashī ketsui" (Japanese: ゆいの悲しい決意)	Hiroyuki Kawasaki	December 23, 1989
40	"Rushing into a witch" Transliteration: "Majō Totsunyū" (Japanese: 魔城突入)	Yoshiyuki Suga	January 6, 1990
41	"Archfiend's Revival (Prelude)"; Transliteration: "Jashin fukkatsu (Zenpen)" (Japanese: 邪神復活(前編))	Toshiki Inoue	January 13, 1990
42	"Archfiend's Revival (Conclusion)"; Transliteration: "Jashin fukkatsu (Kōhen)" (Japanese: 邪神復活(後編))	Hiroyuki Kawasaki	January 20, 1990
43	"The Battle of the Gods that crossed over time" Transliteration: "Toki o koeta kamigami no tatakai" (Japanese: 時をこえた神々の戦い)	Yoshimasa Takahashi	January 27, 1990

== Staff and production notes ==
- Airtime: Saturday, 17:30 - 18:00 hrs.
- Network: Nagoya TV, TV Asahi
- Planning: Sunrise
- Planning coordinator: Dynamic Planning
- Production: Nagoya TV, Tokyu Agency, Sunrise
- Original work: Go Nagai
- Work collaboration: Sunrise
- Episode Directors: Osamu Sekita, Toshifumi Kawase, Masao Ito
- Direction: Norio Kashima
- Scenario: Shō Aikawa (screenwriter), Yoshimasa Takahashi, Toshiki Inoue, Yoshiyuki Suga, Hiroyuki Kawasaki
- Animation director: Yorihisa Uchida, Masanori Yamada, Joji Kikuchi
- Character design: Yorihisa Uchida
- Bio Armor design: Yukihiro Makino
- Music: Hiromoto Tobisawa

=== Theme songs ===
  - 1st Opening theme: Ikari no Jushin (怒りの獣神, ikari no jūshin) (lyrics by Yoshihiko Ando, composition by Takashi Kudo, arrangement by Tatsumi Yano, song by Yumi Hiroki)
  - 2nd Opening theme: Kiseki no Jushin (奇跡の獣神, kiseki no jūshin) (lyrics by Yoshihiko Ando, composition by Takashi Kudo, arrangement by Tatsumi Yano, song by Yumi Hiroki)
  - 1st Ending theme: The Fire (lyrics by Yoshihiko Ando, composition by Takashi Kudo, arrangement by Tatsumi Yano, song by Yumi Hiroki)
  - 2nd Ending theme: Hangyaku no Senshi ~Ryu Dolk no Theme~ (反逆の戦士〜リュウ・ドルクのテーマ〜, hangyaku no senshi ~ryū doruku no tēma~) (lyrics by Yoshihiko Ando, composition by Takashi Kudo, arrangement by Tatsumi Yano, song by Yumi Hiroki)
  - Insert song: Kagami no Komori Uta (鏡の子守り歌) (lyrics by Yoshihiko Ando, composition & arrangement by Hiromoto Tobisawa, song by Yumi Hiroki)
  - Arranged theme: Ikari no Jushin (lyrics by Yoshihiko Ando, composition by Takashi Kudo, arrangement by Kazuo Nobuta, song by MIO) (not used in the original series, but widely available in several music collections)

This was one of the first anime television series to feature two opening and two ending themes, a tendency that has been followed since then by several anime television series. The Ikari no Jushin, besides being still by Japanese wrestler Jushin Liger, has been used by the Hanshin Tigers as the climbing theme of pitcher Hirotaka Egusa. It is one of the anime themes that has been in constant use even after the TV show ended.

=== Manga ===
The manga, which was originally published in Kodansha's magazine Comic Bom Bom, was not published in tankōbon format by this company. Instead, it was published by Keibunsha, Daitosha and Daiso Shuppan.

- Keibunsha (Keibunsha Comic Han, 1990)

Japanese release date	Vol.
January 16, 1990	1
February 15, 1990	2

- Daitosha (St Comics, 1999)

Japanese release date	Vol.	ISBN
June 8, 1999	1	488653127X

- Daiso Shuppan (Daiso Comic Series, 2002)

Japanese release date	Vol.
July 31, 2002	1
July 31, 2002	2

=== Home video ===
The TV series was released in VHS format by King Records in 1989 and 1990. The whole series was released in DVD by Geneon Entertainment in two DVD boxes of 4 discs each, with standard numbers GNBA-1230 and GNBA-1231 and released in August 25, 2006, and October 25, 2006.

=== Music ===
The anime has generated the following records and CDs, all of them produced by King Records.

Title	Format	Standard number	Release date
Jushin Liger (Ikari no Jushin)	EP record	K07S-10295	March 5, 1989
Jushin Liger (Ikari no Jushin)	Cassette	K10H-23034	March 5, 1989
Jushin Liger (Ikari no Jushin)	8cm single CD	K10X-23049	March 5, 1989
Jushin Liger: Hoo Hisho Hen	LP album	230R-7	May 21, 1989
Jushin Liger: Hoo Hisho Hen	CD album	276A-7006	May 21, 1989
Jushin Liger: Fuun Ryuko Hen	LP album	230R-8	August 5, 1989
Jushin Liger: Fuun Ryuko Hen	CD album	276A-7010	August 5, 1989
Jushin Liger (Kiseki no Jushin)	Cassette	091S-10015	September 5, 1989
Jushin Liger (Kiseki no Jushin)	8 cm single CD	091X-10015	September 5, 1989
Jushin Liger: Majin Hoko Hen	CD album	276A-7017	November 21, 1989
Jushin Liger: Hoo Hisho Hen	CD album	KICA-2158	March 5, 1993
Jushin Liger: Fuun Ryuko Hen	CD album	KICA-2159	March 5, 1993
Jushin Liger: Majin Hoko Hen	CD album	KICA-2160	March 5, 1993
Jushin Liger (Ikari no Jushin)	8 cm single CD	KIDA-2121	August 21, 1998

=== Appearances in other media ===
The theme Ikari no Jushin appears in both its original and arranged versions in these CD music collections.

Title	Label	Standard number	Release date
Kettei Ban: Star Child Best Collection	King Records	250A-50063	September 21, 1989
Pro-Wrestling: Pro-Wrestling Kakumeiji Theme Collection	Victor Entertainment	VDR-1649	October 21, 1989
The Pro-Wrestling '90's	Victor Entertainment	VICL-5041	October 25, 1990
New Japan Pro-Wrestling	King Records	KICS-84	February 5, 1991
The Pro-Wrestling: All Japan Pro-Wrestling - New Japan Pro-Wrestling Saishin Ban	Victor Entertainment	VICL-5111	December 5, 1991
Cho Gekisen Samurai Den	Victor Entertainment	VICP-5189	August 26, 1992
Gekitotsu Sengoku: New Japan Pro-Wrestling vs. WAR	Victor Entertainment	VICL-5196	March 24, 1993
New Japan Pro-Wrestling Best: King of Pro-Wrestling	King Records	KICS-361/2	November 23, 1993
Mazinger Densetsu	First Smile Entertainment	FSCA-10031	February 18, 1998
Super Robot Spirits Live Tour'98	First Smile Entertainment	FSCA-10051	September 18, 1998
New Japan Pro-Wrestling Best: King of Pro-Wrestling	King Records	KICS-2271	December 23, 1998
New Japan Pro-Wrestling VIII: Best of the Super Juniors	King Records	KICS-2278	December 23, 1998
Pro-Wrestling Q8 - Ji Dayo! Zenin Syugo	King Records	KICS-2319	October 4, 2000
Euro Anime-J	Chapter One	CHCB-90004	December 21, 2000
Nagai Go Hero Densetsu Kotetsu Majin Hen	First Smile Entertainment	FSCA-10204	January 17, 2002
Toukonssuka!	Pony Canyon	PCCA-01928	August 20, 2003
Super Robot Spirits The Best Vol.1: Super Robot Hen	Be! Smile	BSCH-30001/2	October 22, 2003
Mazinger Densetsu + 7: The Legends of MAZINGER	Be! Smile	BSCH-30012	March 10, 2004
Live!! Super Robot Spirits The Best: SRS Hen Part 1	Be! Smile	BSCH-30016/7	April 21, 2004
Super Robot Spirits The Instrumental: Super robot & Real Robot Hen Vol.1	Be! Smile	BSCH-30030	December 1, 2004
Best of MIQ - MIQUEST: Tamashii wa koku o koete...	Be! Smile	BSCH-30032	January 7, 2005
Super Robot Spirits Shudaika Best Collection 2	Be! Smile	BSCH-30038	September 7, 2005
Nagai Go Dynamic!! The chronicle	Be! Smile	BSCH-30040	December 21, 2005
Super Robot Spirits Best & Live: Girls Hen 2	Be! Smile	BSCH-30042	February 1, 2006
Live! From Super Robot Spirits Tour'98	King Records	KICA-1403/4	May 24, 2006
The Best!! Super Robot Spirits: Ultimate LIVE 10th Anniversary Edition	Be! Smile	BSCH-30057/60	April 25, 2007
The Best!! Super Robot Spirits: Super Robot Studio Recordings	Be! Smile	BSCH-30063/6	July 11, 2007
The Best!! Super Robot Spirits: Girls Best Collection	Be! Smile	BSCH-30077/8	November 28, 2007
Super Robot Spirits: Non stop mix Vol.3	Be! Smile	BSCH-30086	July 9, 2008
Buraban! Tigers	Nippon Crown	CRCP-40217	September 24, 2008
The Best!! Super Robot Spirits: The Best Karaoke songs	Be! Smile	BSCH-30094/7	December 10, 2008

Jushin Liger appears in the Wii video game Super Robot Wars NEO, as well as Super Robot Wars Operation Extend for the PSP. In 2020, the Jushin Liger anime was featured in the mobile game Super Robot Wars X-Ω as part of a special event to celebrate the retirement of Keiichi Yamada, the wrestler who based his gimmick on the series.

== Cultural impact ==
=== Professional Wrestling ===
This anime series inspired the real-life professional wrestler Jushin Thunder Liger.

== See also ==
- Jushin Thunder Liger the professional wrestler.
- Jushin Thunder Liger: Fist of Thunder, the 1995 OVT tokusatsu film.
