= Haruka Aizawa =

Japanese manga author and illustrator (born 1970)

Haruka Aizawa also known as Kotone Kuroki あいざわ 遥
- Born: May 21, 1970 (age 56) Gifu Prefecture, Japan
- Area: Manga artist
- Notable works: Colorful Palette, Linen & Gauze

Haruka Aizawa (あいざわ 遥, Aizawa Haruka also known as Kotone Kuroki; born May 21, 1970) is a Japanese manga author and illustrator. One of her most notable works was Colorful Palette.

== Works ==
Title	Year	Notes	Refs
Ohimesama to Hana to Chou (お姫さまと花と蝶, Princesses and Flowers and Butterflies)	1997 (vol.)	Published by Shueisha, Ribon Mascot Comics, 1 volume	
Oshatō kanzume (お砂糖缶づめ, Sugar canned)	1993–94 (vol.)	Published by Shueisha, Ribon Mascot Comics, 2 volumes	
Orenji kōcha (オレンジ紅茶, Orange Tea)	1995 (vol.)	Published by Shueisha, Ribon Mascot Comics, 1 volumes	
Colorful Palette (ja:カラフル・パレット, Karafuru paretto)	2001–05 (Cookie); 2009 (Bunko)	Published by Shueisha, Ribon Mascot Comics, Cookie, 5 volumes Printed by Shueisha Bunko, 3 volumes	
Garasu-iro no boi (ガラス色のBOY, Glass color boy)	1991	Serialized in Ribon; Published by Shueisha, Ribon Mascot Comics, 2 volumes	
Kisu no kami-kazari (キスの髪飾り, Hair ornaments of Kiss)	1998 (vol.)	Published by Shueisha, Ribon Mascot Comics, 1 volume	
Kiyoshi toko no yoru (キヨシとこの夜, Kiyoshi and this evening)	1993	First printed in Ribon; Published by Shueisha, Ribon Mascot Comics, 1 volume	
Bīzu no yubiwa (ビーズの指輪, Ring of beads)	1999 (vol.)	Published by Shueisha, Ribon Mascot Comics, 1 volume	
Mozaiku no sakana (モザイクの魚, The Mosaic Fish)	2000 (vol.)	Published by Shueisha, Ribon Mascot Comics, Cookie, 1 volume	
Rafia no ribon (ラフィアのリボン, Raffia Ribbon)	1998 (vol.)	Published by Shueisha, Ribon Mascot Comics, 1 volume	
Linen & gauze (ja:リネンとガーゼ, Rinen to gāze)	1998 (vol.)	Published by Shueisha, Ribon Mascot Comics, Cookie, 4 volumes	
Ichirin no hanataba (一輪の花束, One wheel of the bouquet)	1993 (vol.)	Published by Shueisha, Ribon Mascot Comics, 1 volume	
Seifuku no boy (制服のboy, School uniform boy)	1990 (vol.)	Published by Shueisha, Ribon Mascot Comics, 1 volume	
Kimi ni okuru ēru (君におくるエール)	1990	Serialized in Ribon; Published by Shueisha, Ribon Mascot Comics, 1 volume	
Tenshi ni onegai (天使にお願い, Angel to ask)	1995 (vol.)	Published by Shueisha, Ribon Mascot Comics, 1 volume	
Jikai o o tanoshimi ni (次回をおたのしみに, Looking Forward to Next Time)	1997 (vol.)	Published by Shueisha, Ribon Mascot Comics, 1 volume	
Hana o sakasou (花を咲かそう, Let's Make the Flowers)	1995	Serialized in Ribon; Published by Shueisha, Ribon Mascot Comics, 1 volume	
Daremoshiranai niwa nobody knows... (誰も知らない庭nobody knows...)	2013 (vol.)	Published by Margaret Comics, 1 volume	
