= Shirotomo Aizawa =

Japanese composer and conductor

- Shirotomo Aizawa in Tokyo in September 2026
- Born: 1962 (age 63–64); Tokyo
- Education: Tokyo National University of Fine Arts and Music
- Occupation: Composer

Shirotomo Aizawa (愛澤伯友, Aizawa Shirotomo, Shiloh; born November 8, 1962) is a Japanese composer, conductor and multimedia creator.

== Education ==
Born in 1962, Aizawa graduated from metropolitan Tokyo Hibiya High School, the Tokyo National University of Fine Arts and Music, and a graduate school composition course with a full national scholarship. He then studied in Berlin and the Vienna National Music School, and hochschule in a conducting course.

He has done ecriture study with Yuzuru Shimaoka and Koichi Uzaki, composition study with Akira Miyoshi, Teruyuki Noda and Makoto Shinohara, and conducting study with Francis Travis, Julius Kalmer and Seiji Ozawa (Gusthorer).

== Works ==
- Signifiant pour orchestra (1988, Tokyo)
- Kouro-zen Shakuhachi solo (1991, Tokyo)
- Tou-sei Shakuhachi, oh-kawa (1998, Tokyo)
- Su-ohu Japanese instrument ensemble (1998, Tokyo)
- Ride Solo Ichigen-kin (2001, France)
- Phase IIc Cl., Cor., SQ (2005, Tokyo)
- Temp de temp Cl., Perc. (2007, Washington DC)
- Deposition Shakuhachi, Vn., Vc., Cl., Perc., Pf (2007, Washington DC)
- Shiso-chou Shakuhachi, live-electronics (2008, Japan)

== Books ==
- Music of Japan Today Chapter 4; Cambridge Scholars Publishing (2008),ISBN 1847185622
- Transactions on Computational Collective Intelligence XX (Lecture Notes in Computer Science Book 9420) Springer; 1st ed. 2015,ISBN 978-3319275420
- Hougaku journal vo.246 Hougaku Journal Publisheing(2007)
