= Warriors of Tao =

Japanese manga series

- Cover art from Tokyopop's English-language edition of the second volume of Warriors of Tao

TO-mA ～トーマ～ (Tōma)
- Genre: Adventure, Horror
- Manga
- Written by: Kuwahara Shinya
- Published by: Kodansha
- English publisher: NA: Tokyopop
- Magazine: Young Magazine Uppers
- Original run: 2001 – 2002
- Volumes: 4

Warriors of Tao, known in Japan as Toma (TO-mA ～トーマ～, Tōma), is a Japanese manga series by Shinya Kuwahara (桑原真也, Kuwahara Shin-ya).

== Plot ==
"Survival of the fittest" is a universal truth, one that Toma learns the hard way outside of the classroom. Chosen to fight on behalf of the Earth in an interplanetary tournament, Toma realizes that the loser will end up as dead meat - literally. According to the universal plan, there will be "Feeders" and there will be "Food", with the beings of one world feeding on the blood and meat of the others. Only one planet can survive... who will be on the menu?

== Characters ==
- Toma Suguri - An average High School student. He's not one of the brightest students at his school, but he finds out that he's talented in other things like Kendo Training. He stumbles upon Itsuki Aizawa in an empty classroom one day (She is found nude under a desk), which starts a chain reaction, leading to Toma being thrown into a universe called "Tao".
- Itsuki Aizawa -

== Reception ==
The series received mostly negative reviews. Jason Thompson in the book Manga: The Complete Guide said it "quickly becomes really disgusting" and "ends abruptly". He concluded: "Weepy subplots amid the gore drag the rating even lower, although like Arm of Kannon, it's a worthy read for anyone who likes a good gross-out". Liann Cooper of Anime News Network wrote, "I didn't think it was possible, but I think I may have found a manga bad enough to be the companion to Evil's Return. Yes, folks... it's that bad." Evil's Return is a manhwa, whose Cooper's review stated: "I'm desperately trying to find something... ANYTHING good to say about Evil's Return, but I can't."
