= Kiyoharu Aizawa =

Japanese academic

Kiyoharu Aizawa is a full professor at the Department of Information and Communication Engineering of the University of Tokyo. He was named a fellow of the Institute of Electronics, Information and Communication Engineers (2012) and a Fellow of the Institute of Electrical and Electronics Engineers (IEEE) in 2016 for contributions to model-based coding and multimedia life logging.

Aizawa received B.E., M.E. and Dr.E. in electrical engineering all from the University of Tokyo in 1983, 1985 and 1988 respectively. From 1990 to 1992, he was a visiting professor at the University of Illinois and is known to serve as editor-in-chief of the Journal of ITE Japan and Senior Associate Editor of IEEE Trans. Image Processing.
