= Jushin Thunder Liger: Fist of Thunder =

- Cover of the original VHS release
- Directed by: Takuya Wada
- Written by: Takuya Wada; Masanobu Utsugi; Go Nagai (original character)
- Starring: Jushin Thunder Liger; Masaru Matsuda; Reiko Kataoka; Muscle Kitamura; Satoshi Kojima; Yuji Nagata; Manabu Nakanishi; Shinjiro Otani; Tatsuhito Takaiwa
- Cinematography: Tatsuhiko Maeyama
- Music by: ZNX (songs)
- Distributed by: Bandai Visual
- Release date: February 21, 1995
- Running time: 91 minutes
- Country: Japan
- Language: Japanese

Jushin Thunder Liger: Fist of Thunder (獣神サンダー・ライガー 怒りの雷鳴 ＦＩＳＴ ＯＦ ＴＨＵＮＤＥＲ, Jūshin Sandā Raigā - Ikari no Raimei FIST OF THUNDER; translated as Beast God Thunder Liger - Raging Thunder) is a 1995 direct-to-video tokusatsu wrestling/superhero movie. Produced by Bandai Visual, this film is a showcase for the popular wrestler Jushin Thunder Liger, who was based upon the anime series Jushin Liger created by Go Nagai, who supervised this film's production. In this film, Liger and his arch-enemy Bounty Viper turn into demon-beast versions of themselves, both designed by veteran makeup artist Steve Wang.

In this film, Jushin Thunder Liger, when unmasked, is played by actor Masaru Matsuda (to protect the real Liger's identity).

== Plot ==
Popular wrestler Jushin Thunder Liger is having fits of dizziness and headaches, as he recalls childhood memories of being chased by demons. Helping him is a woman photographer named Miki Aizawa (Reiko Kataoka).

Liger's fears will be realized when a match is announced that will have him in a three-way bout against an evil gaijin wrestler named Bounty Viper (played by bodybuilder Muscle Kitamura) and another wrestler named Riot Orff (played by wrestler Shinjiro Otani). Viper, in particular, has plans for Liger...

While Liger copes with his childhood fears, he gets ready for the three-way wrestling match. When the big fight begins on that night, the fight seems tough for Liger as he realizes that there's something very peculiar about Bounty Viper. He has demonic powers, similar to the demons that persecuted him as a child. In the course of the fight, Viper displays his wickedness by violently maiming Riot Orff. Liger eventually becomes violent, and when he and Viper tear into each other, both wrestlers begin to pulsate and glow with energy. In light speed, they dash out of the ring into a deserted street where they transform into demonic versions of themselves (Liger, of course, resembling his costumed self, and Viper superficially resembling a blue version of the Predator) and a savage fight to the finish ensues.
