= Young Magazine Uppers =

Japanese manga magazine

- Categories: Seinen manga
- Frequency: Semimonthly
- First issue: April 1, 1998
- Final issue: October 19, 2004
- Company: Kodansha
- Country: Japan
- Based in: Tokyo
- Language: Japanese

Young Magazine Uppers (Japanese: ヤングマガジンアッパーズ, Hepburn: Yangu Magajin Appāzu) was a semimonthly seinen manga magazine published by Kodansha from April 1, 1998, until October 19, 2004, when it ended publication.

== List of serialized manga ==
- Forest of Piano by Makoto Isshiki (1998–2004), (moved to Morning after the cancellation of the magazine)
- Garōden by Keisuke Itagaki and Baku Yumemakura (1999–2004), (moved to Evening after the cancellation of the magazine)
- Hana Usagi by Kentarō Kobayashi (1999–2004)
- Gregory Horror Show by Naomi Iwata (2000)
- Inu Neko Jump! by Mitsuru Hattori (2000–2001)
- Warriors of Tao by Shinya Kuwahara (2001–2002)
- Rose Hip Rose by Tōru Fujisawa (2002–2003)
- Otogi no Machi no Rena by Mitsuru Hattori (2002–2004)
- Basilisk by Masaki Segawa (2003–2004)
- Majokko Tsukune-chan by Hiroaki Magari (2003–2004), (moved to Monthly Shōnen Sirius after the cancellation of the magazine)
