= Masaki Yamada (writer) =

Japanese writer (born 1950)

- 山田 正紀
- Born: January 16, 1950 (age 76); Nagoya, Japan
- Writing career
- Notable awards: Nihon SF Taisho Award; Seiun Award

Masaki Yamada (山田 正紀, Yamada Masaki; born January 16, 1950 in Nagoya) is a Japanese crime and science fiction author. He has won the Nihon SF Taisho Award, the Seiun Award three times, and an award for mystery fiction. His first story was published in 1974. His novel Aphrodite was translated into English in 2004. He also wrote After the Long Goodbye, a Ghost in the Shell-related novel.

== Works in English translation ==
Novels

- Aphrodite (Kurodahan Press, 2004)
- Ghost in the Shell 2: Innocence: After the Long Goodbye (Viz Media, 2005 ISBN 1421501562, 2007 ISBN 1421513943)

Short stories

- "The Import of Tremors" (Lairs of the Hidden Gods, Volume 1: Night Voices, Night Journeys, Kurodahan Press, 2005)
- "Silver Bullet" (Speculative Japan 3, Kurodahan Press, 2012)
