= Blitch =

Blitch is a surname. Notable people with the surname include:

- Iris Faircloth Blitch (1912–1993), American politician
- J. S. Blitch, appointed warden of Florida State Prison in 1919
- Newton Amos Blitch (1844–1921), American politician
- Peg Blitch (1934–2021), American politician

== See also ==
- Blitch, Georgia, United States, an unincorporated community
- Blatch, another surname
