= America Zarigani =

Japanese comedy duo

- Other name: Amezari
- Style: Manzai
- Awards: 1998 – 19th ABC Comedy Newcomer Grand Prix, Jury Special Award; 1998 – 28th NHK Kamigata Manzai Contest, Best Award; 2002 – 31st Kamigata Comedy Awards, Best Technique Award; 2003 – 38th Kamigata Manzai Awards, Encouragement Award; 2008 – 6th MBS New Generation Manzai Award, Winner

Comedy career
- Years active: 1994–
- Website: Official profile

America Zarigani (アメリカザリガニ) is a Japanese comedy duo formed in 1994 by Tetsuya Yanagihara (born September 1, 1972) and Yoshiyuki Hirai (born March 12, 1973).

They are a manzai group and perform in the Kansai dialect.

== Origins ==
America Zarigani started out as a theatrical troupe but became a comedic duo composed of just Hirai and Yanagihara after the other members left.

== Current members ==
=== Tetsuya Yanagihara ===
In addition to performing in America Zarigani, Yanagihara works as a voice actor. He has voice-acted in anime like My Instant Death Ability Is So Overpowered.

=== Yoshiyuki Hirai ===
Hirai attended Osaka Designer's College, with the intention to pursue a career in the video games industry, but started performing comedy after being recommended by a friend. In addition to performing in America Zarigani, Hirai has also written video games including Weapon Shop de Omasse, and the flash anime Aka-chan. He has also voice-acted in the anime Inzauma Eleven and Prince of Tennis.

Both are natives of Hirakata City, Osaka Prefecture, and are classmates in middle and high school.

== Career ==
- The pair first met in middle school, where they were in the same class. They became close in high school, sitting next to each other and sharing the same classes in their first and second years—this was a decisive factor in their friendship, both sharing interests in anime and comedy.
- At age 20, they formed a comedy unit with three friends, initially called "Gekidan America Zari Gani" (American Crayfish Troupe) with five members. They officially started full activity during their third year of university in 1994. The group name is derived from creatures they captured as children, which could be abbreviated. However, the name was assigned randomly during their amateur days and stuck with them.
- They achieved 16 consecutive wins on "Baka-Show On Air Battle," with a top score of 517 KB. They participated three times in the Champion Tournament, reaching the finals in 1999 (second place).
- They competed in the first M-1 Grand Prix in 2001, reaching the finals for three consecutive years, finishing 4th in 2001, 9th in 2002, and 7th in 2003. In 2001, they were the fourth act to perform, maintaining second place but lost to Hariganeroock in the final.
- They won the 6th "MBS New Generation Manzai Award" in 2008, the first duo outside Yoshimoto Kogyo to do so.
- They have held regular live shows called "Amerizari Live" at Shochiku Geino Shinjuku Kadoza since May 2011.
- On November 11, 2015, they streamed their solo "Amerizari Solo Live" on Nico Nico Douga, a first for Shochiku Geino, with audience participation via comments"America Zari Gani's first solo live streamed on NicoNico". Nikkansports. 2015-11-11..
- In October 2018, they used Virtual Cast to perform as VTubers, and in January 2019, they appeared as VTubers on NHK's "Nihon no Dojime" (NHK Virtual Dojime).
- Their comedy costumes were not fixed initially, but recently Yanagihara often wears red, and Hirai wears blue.

== Awards and Achievements ==
M-1 Grand Prix

Year	Result	Entry No.	Final Catchphrase	Notes
2001	3rd place in finals	1118	"Three Octaves Shock"	Did not advance to the final due to regulations
2002	9th place in finals	1751		
2003	7th place in finals	1888	"Third Time's the Charm"	

"Baka-Show" On Air Battle Champion Tournament

Year	Result	Notes
2000 (2nd)	4th place in finals	Passed in the first group
2001 (3rd)	Semi-final eliminated	League A, 6th place
2002 (4th)	Semi-final eliminated	Block B, 6th place

Other Awards & Achievements

- 1998: 19th ABC Newcomers Grand Prix, Special Jury Prize
- 1998: 28th NHK Kamigata Manzai Contest, Best Award
- 1998: 27th Kamigata Comedy Awards, Silver Award
- 1999: 34th Kamigata Manzai Awards, Newcomer Award
- 2002: 31st Kamigata Comedy Awards, Best Skill Award
- 2003: 38th Kamigata Manzai Awards, Encouragement Award
- 2008: 6th "MBS New Generation Manzai Award" (Champions)
- 2010: World Table Tennis CM Award, Encouragement Award (Hirai)
- 2010: King of Conte semi-finalists
- 2010: The Ena's "Nico Nico Carpet" Champions
- 2011: Nippon Food "The Manzai" 2011, eliminated in finals

== Appearances ==
=== TV Shows ===
==== Regular Appearances ====
- Otoosan to Issho (March 24, 2013 – March 31, 2021 on NHK BS Premium, from April 11, 2021 on NHK Educational) – Shushu (Yanagihara: voice/puppetry)
- Japan in Motion (February 25, 2014 – , Nolife, TV Shinhiroshima) – Reporter
- Data Navi: Reading the Future (October 3, 2015 – , NHK General) – Data King (Yanagihara: voice)
- Welcome! Yokimaru House (NHK E-TV, August 8, 2022 – , Shushu)
- Sugo E Festa 2023 (NHK E-TV, November 13–25, 2023, Shushu)
- Sugo E Festa 2025 (NHK E-TV, November 8, 2025, Shushu)

==== Internet Live Shows ====
- Otonamo Omocha (March 25, 2013 – , Nico Nico Live) – Hirai only
- Super Piko Piko Club (June 20, 2013 – , Nico Nico Live)
- Capcom TV! (June 18, 2014 – , Nico Nico Live) – Hirai only (Note: Hirai sometimes appears as a guest.)
- Denjin☆Getcha! (September 4, 2014 – , Nico Nico Live) – Yanagihara only (Note: Hirai sometimes appears as a guest.)
- Hokka Hokka Dake Ne! V Jump! (May 23, 2016 – , Nico Nico Live) – Hirai only
- Segaa Pu Nico Live (May 25, 2016 – , Nico Nico Live) – Yanagihara only
- "23/7 Twenty Three Seven" Broadcast Station (January 11, 2018 – , Nico Nico Channel) – Hirai only
- Steins;Gate Zero Future Gadget Lab Abema Branch (May 9, 2018 – , AbemaTV) – Yanagihara only
- Tokyo Idol Stadium 2020 (June 9, 2020 – , REALITY) – Hirai only

==== On-Demand Distribution ====
- Eimi Naruse of Denpa-gumi Inc. introduces manga with high energy (May 22, 2015 – , Fuji TV On Demand) – Yanagihara only
- "Zaripai-sensei's Want to Play Games!!" (July 17, 2015 – , YouTube, V Jump Channel) – Hirai

=== Past Appearances ===
==== TV ====
- Regular Appearances
  - Nurture Hobby Encyclopedia (April 1997 – January 1998, NHK Educational)
  - Takajin Heartful (Kansai TV) – semi-regular
  - Rakurabu (October 2000 – March 2001, KBS Kyoto)
  - Blatch (April 2001 – September 2001, Kansai TV)
  - Aruki Puchi Kyoto (October 2001 – June 2002, Kansai TV)
  - Ensoku TV! (July 2002 – April 2003, Kansai TV)
  - Weekly Theater (Kansai TV)
  - Saigo no Bansan (until March 25, 2002, Yomiuri TV) – Hirai only
  - BAN! BOO! Pain!! (April 1, 2002 – March 26, 2003, Yomiuri TV)
  - Nippon Yugai Kazoku (from April 2002, NHK General) – semi-regular
  - Owarai Financier JAPAN (from April 2002, CS Fuji TV 721) – bi-weekly regular
  - Hyakuman Baryoku "Masuo & Ameza Rii's Unreasonable Training" (July – September 2002, Asahi Broadcasting)
  - Shoubin + Osero's V.I.P. (October 2003 – April 2004, Asahi Broadcasting)
  - Oshaberi Brunch (Asahi Broadcasting) – "Brunch Exploration Corps" reporter
  - Shibusuta S.B.S.T (April 1, 2004 – March 31, 2005, TV Tokyo) – Thursday regular
  - Wide! ABC (Asahi Broadcasting) – "Ameza Rii Real Estate" corner
  - Masuda Okada Kado Paa! (April 2004 – , Asahi Broadcasting)
  - Machi Uke! (Mainichi Broadcasting)
  - Hanamaru Market (TV Tokyo) – "Problem Solving! Amano-shaku" corner
  - TV Champion (TV Tokyo) – "Come at me!" corner
  - Bishoujo Kenkyujo (October 6 – December 22, 2005, TV Tokyo)
  - Anime Terebi (TV Tokyo) – host
  - Akiba! AKIBA☆Aki (April 5 – September 27, 2006, Tokyo MX)
  - Mania no Sake (January 12 – March 30, 2007, TV Tokyo)
  - Matsutake-chan (from July 7, 2008, Yosedo Channel)
  - Saki Yomi Jan BANG! (April 3, 2009 – March 28, 2014, TV Tokyo) – MC: Ame Pai (Yanagihara), Zaripai (Hirai)
  - Monster Hunter Plus (TV Tokyo) – MC
  - Natsume Yujinchou episode 5 "Kokoro-iro no Kippu" (August 4, 2008, TV Tokyo) – San to (Hirai), Mikuri (Yanagihara)
  - Inazuma Eleven (November 4 – 11, 2009, TV Tokyo) – Neppa (Yanagihara), Bomber (Hirai)
  - Hanakappa (NHK Educational) – Color Batcho (Yanagihara), Momokappa's Father (Yanagihara), Tsunenari's Father (Hirai)
  - Jewelpet Twinkle (June 19 – October 2, 2010, TV Tokyo) – I Am Pen (Yanagihara)
  - Kuttin Idol Ai! Ma'in! Main! (NHK Educational) – Scara (Yanagihara)
  - Rirupuri (TV Tokyo) – Magic Mirror (Yanagihara)
  - Arashi no Yoru ni: Himitsu no Tomodachi (April 18 – September 26, 2012, TV Tokyo) – Zack (Yanagihara)
  - Explorers Driland episode 5 "Chase the Secret Stone! Darkness Tambourine, Yadasu!" (November 24, 2012, TV Tokyo) – Yadasu (Yanagihara)
  - Driland: 1000 Years of True Treasure episode 20 (April 6, 2013 – March 29, 2014, TV Tokyo) – Mekkī (Yanagihara)
  - Beast Saga (2013, TV Tokyo) – Mantarai (Yanagihara)
  - Gaisuto Crusher (October 2, 2013 – July 16, 2014, TV Tokyo) – Abura-ya Densuke (Yanagihara)
  - Go!Go! Kaden Danshi (2013, Hikari TV) – Takoyaki Maker (Hirai)
  - Dragon Collection (August 25, 2014 – March 16, 2015, TV Tokyo) – Bran Mon (Yanagihara)
  - Yu Gi Oh! ARC-V episode 98 "One Path" (March 27, 2016, TV Tokyo) – Yager (Yanagihara)
  - B-PROJECT ~Ko-do*Ambitious~ episode 10 "BIRTHDAY" (August 28?, 2016) – Producer (Yanagihara)
  - Kamimazawa Wonder (2016, TBS TV) – Panta Takezo (Yanagihara)
  - I Want to be Hugged! episode 8 "Zuzura, Don't Switch, Don't Switch" (November 24?, 2018) – Polynesian Dancer (Yanagihara)
  - Aha! Meisaku-kun (2019, NHK Educational) – Nakamu (Yanagihara), Sato (Hirai)
  - Kinnikuman: Seikoku Chōjin Shiso-hen (July 7, 2024 – January 12, 2025, TBS) – Nakano Kazuo (Yanagihara) (Note: As of August 4, 2024)
  - Yokai Gakko Hajimemashita! (2024, TOKYO MX and others) – Small Old Man (Yanagihara)

=== Theatrical Anime ===
- South Park: The Movie (1999, Paramount Pictures) – Eric Cartman (Yanagihara), Chef (Hirai) (Note: Cast based on the fact that "America Zari Gani" is said to have scissors like Balutans.)
- Yatterman (2009, Shochiku) – Brief appearance, scene cut in the final version (discussed in "Thread King ABC" broadcast on March 7, 2009). (Note: However, both names appear in the credits of the pamphlet.)
- Garo: Soukou no Maou (2013, Tohokushinsha) – Esalt (Yanagihara: voice)
- Hana Kappa: Hana Sake! Pattaa Chō no Daibōken (2013, Toho) – Carabacho (Yanagihara: voice)

=== Commercials ===
- TV Tokyo series Bomberman Jetterz (2002) – Gung (Yanagihara), Bango (Hirai)
- Shiseido uno (cosmetics) (2005)
- Capcom Monster Hunter G (Wii) (2009) – Ailu (Yanagihara), Pugi (Hirai)
- Capcom Monster Hunter 4 "Three Little Pigs" version (2014) – Light blue piglet (Yanagihara), Wolf (Hirai)

=== Other Appearances ===
- "BE" / Supercar (1999) – Music PV: Friend of a friend (Yanagihara), Friend of a friend’s friend (Hirai)
- Famitsu Game Channel (EZ Channel)
- Xbox 360 Inside Xbox
- Hunter Diary 2 (Famitsu Wave DVD) – Legendary comedian hunter (Yanagihara & Hirai)
- Suda51's Suda Checker (Kojima Productions) – Steebo (Yanagihara)
- Inomaru Dashi (VOMIC) – Kenta (Yanagihara), Mocchan (Hirai)
- Bomberman Jetterz "Episode 53: Coming Back Jetterz" (Drama CD) – Gung (Yanagihara), Bango (Hirai)

== Discography ==
=== CDs ===
- ON THE BEACH (March 12, 2000) – Maxi single produced as part of Wakayama Broadcasting project. "Hirai Blues" sung by Hirai, "On the Beach" by Yanagihara.
- Omoshiro Kenkou Hyakuka Vol.10 (Tokuma Japan Communications, April 25, 2001) – Features "Gomi Western," sung by Yanagihara, played once on "Thread King ABC".
- Doronuma Gekijo (Saitron, April 24, 2002)
- Koi wa Cheese Burger / I'm the Leader (Saitron, September 19, 2002) – Ending theme for Yomiuri TV "BAN!BOO! Pain!!"
- Doronuma Gekijo 2 (Saitron, April 23, 2003)
- Doronuma Gekijo 3 (Saitron, October 22, 2003)
- Anison Plus x Anime☆Dance Collection (Independent Label Council Japan, July 1, 2009) – Includes "Motteke! Sailor Fuku" from "Lucky Star" (Yanagihara as Key Bo) and "Cobra" from "Space Cobra" (Yanagihara).

=== DVDs ===
- America Zari Gani Doronuma Theater "Nishini" (Sony Music Entertainment, December 18, 2002)
- Bakusho On Air Battle America Zari Gani (NHK Software, March 19, 2003)
- M-1 Grand Prix 2001 Complete Version – And the Legend Began (Yoshimoto R&C, December 17, 2003) – Partial release
- M-1 Grand Prix 2002 Complete Version – All the Fierce Battles (Yoshimoto R&C, December 17, 2003) – Partial release
- M-1 Grand Prix 2003 Complete Version – The Passion of M-1 Warriors (Yoshimoto R&C, July 14, 2004) – Partial release
- Live! Chikaru Japan Tour 2004 (Sony Music Distribution, December 22, 2004) – Partial release
- Dead Ball 1: The Life-Threatening Ball That Will Surely Hit You (Tokuma Japan Communications, January 19, 2005) – Includes "Yatsu" and "Yatsu's" scenes
- Enta no Kami-sama Best Selection Vol. 2 (Vap, January 26, 2005) – Partial release
- Enta no Kami-sama Best Selection Vol. 4 (Vap, March 23, 2005) – Partial release
- America Zari Gani Kikai no Karada DVD (Enterbrain, March 24, 2005)
- Maji☆Wara Vol.2 (Fourside.com, April 25, 2005) – Partial
- Shochiku Kadoza Live: Shochiku Kadoza Live (Vap, July 21, 2005) – Partial
- Live! Chikaru 2005 Laughing Expo (Sony Music Direct, December 7, 2005) – Partial
- Peace! Special Tenkaichi Bushoukai ~ The Strongest! Owarai Hakata Kessen Part 1 (Victor Entertainment, December 25, 2005) – Partial
- Shochiku Geino Live Vol.7 America Zari Gani: Invasion and Love (Shochiku, October 28, 2006)
- Chikaru 2006 Special Shochiku Geino Comedy Collection (Sony Music Direct, December 13, 2006) – Partial
- America Zari Gani Kikai no Karada DVD 2 (Enterbrain, December 20, 2006)
- America Zari Gani Kikai no Karada DVD 3 (Enterbrain, December 20, 2006)
- America Zari Gani Kikai no Karada DVD 4 (Enterbrain, December 20, 2006)
- America Zari Gani Kikai no Karada Taiheiyo Game-sai (Pony Canyon, July 1, 2009)
- America Zari Gani Kikai no Karada Yana-hara Game-sai (Pony Canyon, August 5, 2009)
- America Zari Gani Kikai no Karada Hira-i Game-sai (Pony Canyon, August 5, 2009)
- America Zari Gani Kikai no Karada Kiseki no Daifukkatsu-hen!! (Ebten exclusive, September 30, 2011)
- The Game Maker ~Sunsoft Edition~ (Happinet, January 19, 2010) – Hirai only
- The Game Maker ~Jaleco Edition~ (Happinet, January 19, 2010) – Hirai only
- The Game Maker ~Taito Edition~ (Happinet, March 19, 2010) – Hirai only
- The Game Maker ~Irem Edition~ (Happinet, March 19, 2010) – Hirai only

=== Network Streaming ===
- WARHAWK America's Kikai no Karada Part.1 (October 3, 2007, PSN, Sony Computer Entertainment)
- WARHAWK America's Kikai no Karada Part.2 (October 3, 2007, PSN, Sony)

=== Serializations ===
- Jump Soul G! "Zariman." (Weekly Shonen Jump)
- Saki Yomi Jan BANG!: Zaripai-sensei's 4-panel comic corner "DARO!" (Saikyo Jump) – Manga by Hirai, collected in volume in 2013
- Industry Late Bloomer Girl (started September 10, 2015, manga serialization) – Manga by Hirai

=== Others ===
- "South Park: The Uncensored Movie" DVD (April 2008, Kodansha)
- GUILD01 (May 31, 2012, Level-5) – Nintendo 3DS game including Hirai's game "Rental Weapon Shop de Omasse"
- MC for the special event of the TV anime Houseki no Kuni (Land of the Jewels)

== Appearances ==
- Sakiyomi Jan Bang!
- Shiseido (Uno)
- Kochikame
- Reborn!
- Jewelpet
- Natsume Yujincho
- Yatterman
- Tanken Driland
- Professor Layton Series
- Arashi no Yoru ni (movie)
- Ni no Kuni: Wrath of the White Witch
