= James Dennis =

James Dennis may refer to:

- James Dennis, 1st Baron Tracton (1721–1782), lord chief baron of the Exchequer in Ireland
- James Dennis (athlete) (born 1976), American discus thrower
- James Blatch Piggott Dennis (1815–1861), British paleontologist
- James L. Dennis (born 1936), American judge
- James U. Dennis (1823–1900), American politician and lawyer

== See also ==
- James Dennis House, historic building in Rhode Island, United States
