= List of My Happy Marriage episodes =

Key visual for the series

My Happy Marriage is a Japanese anime television series based on the light novel series of the same name written by Akumi Agitogi and illustrated by Tsukiho Tsukioka. An anime series adaptation, produced by Kinema Citrus, was announced on April 5, 2022. It was directed by Takehiro Kubota, with supervision and storyboards handled by Takao Abo, scripts written by Ami Satō, Takahito Ōnishi and Momoka Toyoda, character designs by Shōko Yasuda, and music composed by Evan Call. The series aired in Japan from July 5 to September 20, 2023, on Tokyo MX and other networks, with Netflix simulcasting the series globally, while Bilibili simulcasted it in mainland China. The opening theme song is "Anata no Soba ni" (貴方の側に。; lit. 'By Your Side') by Riria, while the ending theme song is "Vita Philosophica" (ヰタ・フィロソフィカ) by Kashitarō Itō. The thirteenth episode was bundled as an original video animation (OVA) with the special edition of the eighth light novel volume, which was released on March 15, 2024. The OVA premiered on Netflix on November 22 of the same year.

A second season was announced after the airing of the twelfth episode. Masayuki Kojima co-directed the season with Takehiro Kubota, while Ami Satō was the sole head writer and also co-wrote the script with Minori Hashiba, Fūka Ishii, and Momoka Toyoda. The season aired from January 6 to April 9, 2025. The opening theme song is "Shiawase no Yakusoku" (幸せな約束。; lit. 'A Happy Promise') by Riria, while the ending theme song is "Tsukikage Okuri" (月影おくり; lit. 'Moonlight Sending') by Kashitarō Itō.

A new anime project was announced after the airing of the second-season finale. In November 2025, it was announced to be a three-episode special that aired in Japan on October 25, 2026, and is streaming worldwide on Netflix. The opening theme song is "Shiawase de Namida ga Deru no wa." (幸せで涙が出るのは。; lit. 'Crying Tears of Happiness.') by Riria, while the ending theme song is "Prelude no Temae ni: for me&you" (プレリュードの手前に 〜for me&you〜; lit. 'Right Before the Prelude: for me&you') by Kashitarō Itō.

== Series overview ==
Season	Episodes	Originally released	
Season	Episodes	First released	Last released
1	13	July 5, 2023	March 15, 2024
2	13	January 6, 2025	April 9, 2025

== Episodes ==
=== Season 1 (2023–24) ===
No. overall	No. in season	Title	Directed by	Written by	Storyboarded by	Original release date
1	1	"The Meeting"; Transliteration: "Deai" (Japanese: 出会い)	Takehiro Kubota	Ami Satō	Takehiro Kubota	July 5, 2023
Miyo Saimori is the eldest daughter of the Saimori family famed for its spiritual abilities, but she herself lacks it. Following the death of her mother, her father Shinichi marries his lover Kanoko and has a second daughter, Kaya. Since her childhood, Miyo has been mistreated as a servant. Her only friend is Kouji Tatsuishi, who is in love with her and hopes to rescue her by marrying her. Unfortunately, his father Minoru, desiring a more prestigious bride for Kouji, has him engaged to Kaya so he will one day become head of the Saimoris. To get rid of her in a way that makes her useful, Shinichi arranges for Miyo to be engaged with Kiyoka Kudou from the Kudou family, a notoriously bad-tempered soldier known to scare away potential wives within days of meeting. Kouji is forced to accept as long as Miyo will escape her family. Miyo makes her way alone to the remote Kudou estate and meets Kiyoka's servant Yurie. Introduced to her fiancé, she is amazed at his handsomeness, yet Kiyoka is irritated by her passiveness, subservient manner and low self-esteem.
2	2	"About My Husband-to-Be"; Transliteration: "Danna-sama Toiu Okata" (Japanese: 旦那さまという御方)	Teppei Takeya	Takahito Ōnishi	Takao Abo	July 12, 2023
Yurie assures Miyo the rumors of Kiyoka's cruelty have been exaggerated. Miyo dreams of her father's negligence towards her when she lacked the Saimori Spirit-Sight. Miyo prepares breakfast only for Kiyoka to callously assume she was sent to poison him. Kiyoka leaves to train his supernaturally gifted soldiers to kill demons called Grotesqueries, though Grotesqueries are so rare they have not fought one in years. Meanwhile, Koji moves into the Saimori estae and sees the tiny room Miyo used to sleep in. Back at the Kudou estate, Kiyoka notices Miyo's habit of apologizing for everything. Feeling guilty, he asks her to cook breakfast in the morning. Miyo dreams of her father allowing Kanoko to relentlessly and viciously abuse her. The next day, Kiyoka praises her cooking and is perplexed when it makes her cry. Bemused by her behavior, he decides to have the Saimori family investigated. Later, Minoru is furious to find out Miyo is now engaged to Kiyoka, having previously agreed that Koji would marry Kaya only if Miyo was allowed to marry his eldest son Kazushi, since her maternal relation to the Usuba family makes her valuable as a wife even without her spiritual powers.
3	3	"Our First Date"; Transliteration: "Hajimete no Dēto" (Japanese: 初めてのデヱト)	Kōji Furukuwa	Ami Satō	Masatsugu Arakawa	July 19, 2023
Kiyoka invites Miyo on their first date to go shopping in town. Miyo has no idea what to do and simply tries to not be a bother. At the Saimori residence, Minoru is still furious to have lost Miyo's Usuba bloodline for Kazushi's future children, but is assured by Shinichi that once Kiyoka rejects Miyo, Kazushi can have her. Kaya is frustrated to overhear them still discussing Miyo, especially as she suspects Koji's feelings for Miyo. Meanwhile, remembering Yurie told him about Miyo mending her own clothes, Kiyoka secretly commissions a kimono. Although she is thankful for Kiyoka's kindness, Miyo decides to hide her lack of spiritual gift in case Kiyoka abandons her. The next day, an informant, Iwashimizu, shows Kiyoka the details of the investigation into the Saimori family. While disgusted by the blatant evidence of their severe neglect and abuse towards Miyo, Kiyoka also learns of her lack of spiritual powers and relation to the Usuba family, who has an ability to manipulate people's minds. As he is about to return to Miyo, he destroys several shikigami, infuriated upon learning someone was spying on him.
4	4	"The Gift"; Transliteration: "Okurimono" (Japanese: おくりもの)	Kōji Furukuwa	Momoka Toyoda	Takao Abo	July 26, 2023
While Yurie suggests a gift that is something handmade, Miyo decides to make a kumihimo since Kiyoka always ties his hair with one. Miyo is later given a protective charm by Kiyoka, who makes her promise to take it everywhere she goes. During her shopping with Yurie, Miyo encounters Kaya and Koji. Kaya begins bullying and threatening Miyo until Yurie reveals that Miyo is still engaged to Kiyoka. Meanwhile, Kiyoka visits Shinichi and Kanoko to inform them that they will receive none of the traditional benefits from Miyo marrying into a powerful family unless she receives a full apology. Kaya later briefly encounters Kiyoka and is struck by his beauty. Yurie informs Kiyoka of the incident and encourages him to give Miyo his unconditional love. When Kiyoka invites Hana over, a servant Miyo was close to as a child before she was unfairly dismissed by the Saimoris, Miyo is overjoyed to see her. She soon realizes Kiyoka must know her entire history, including her lack of spiritual talents, yet he nevertheless wants to marry her. Feeling relieved, she gifts the kumihimo to Kiyoka who promises he will never reject her. Watching their blossoming love through more shikigami, Minoru desperately plots to break them up with a plan involving Kaya.
5	5	"Ripples"; Transliteration: "Hamon" (Japanese: 波紋)	Masayuki Kojima	Ami Satō	Masayuki Kojima	August 2, 2023
At the Tatsuishi residence, Minoru invites Kaya over and shows her the photo of Miyo and Kiyoka, happily engaged; Kaya suddenly recognizes Kiyoka as the beautiful man. As Minoru had hoped, Kaya becomes jealous of the situation and swears to have her father sever Miyo and Kiyoka's engagement. Meanwhile, Miyo invites Godo for dinner as a thank you for reuniting her with Hana. Kaya spies on Miyo and Kiyoka through her shikigami, furious that Miyo is happier than she was before. Later that night, Kiyoka consoles Miyo, who has a nightmare. After Shinichi bluntly turns down Kaya's request, she instead offers the suspicious Koji a chance to marry Miyo like he wished. The next day, Miyo forgets her protective charm while delivering a bento to Kiyoka and is kidnapped soon after. Koji discovers his father's plot to kidnap Miyo. Enraged that his father knew about Miyo's abuse this entire time but did nothing, Koji attacks his father with his powers but is defeated and restrained. After Minoru leaves to deal with Miyo, Kazushi frees Koji and encourages him to go help her. A distraught Yurie informs Kiyoka of Miyo's abduction just as Koji arrives and desperately begs Kiyoka to help save Miyo.
6	6	"Determination and Thunder"; Transliteration: "Ketsui to Raimei" (Japanese: 決意と雷鳴)	Takushi Koide	Takahito Ōnishi	Takushi Koide	August 9, 2023
Miyo is taken captive in the Saimori storage room by Kaya and Kanoko, who attempt to force her to call off her engagement with Kiyoka. Miyo strongly refuses before Kanoko assaults her for her newfound defiance. Meanwhile, Kiyoka and Koji head to the Saimori residence to rescue Miyo. Kiyoka destroys a barrier cast by Minoru and Shinichi, and Minoru attacks Kiyoka with his pyrokinetic powers before unwittingly setting the Saimori estate on fire. Kiyoka single-handedly defeats Minoru with lightning, rendering him unconscious; Shinichi laments in despair over the destruction of the Saimori family's estate. Once Kiyoka arrives in time to save Miyo, Kanoko breaks down upon witnessing the burning residence. When Kiyoka confronts Kaya for her actions, she denies it and tries to approach him about being his fiancée but he rejects her due to her selfishness. Frustrated, Kaya tells Koji to leave her, but he refuses as he does not want Miyo to be tormented by grief ever again. Following the incident, the Emperor is displeased over Minoru's failure and grants his envoy Arata Tsuruki permission to deal with Miyo and Kiyoka. Miyo wakes up to find Kiyoka by her side. Kiyoka reassures her that everything that happened was not her fault as he, along with a very relieved Yurie, is glad that she is safe and sound.
7	7	"Glamorous Lady of Summer"; Transliteration: "Natsu no Hana no Modan Gāru" (Japanese: 夏の華の淑女(モダンガール))	Sōtarō Shimizu	Momoka Toyoda	Masayuki Kojima	August 16, 2023
Miyo requests Kiyoka to take her to the Saimori estate one last time after learning that it had completely burned down. Once they arrive there, Kiyoka informs Miyo that her kidnapping incident has not yet been revealed to the public. The Tatsuishis did not receive punishment and instead Minoru is replaced by Kazushi as the family head. Due to losing the Saimori family's fortune to the house fire, Shinichi and Kanako moved to the countryside while Kaya will be sent to a strict household as a live-in servant. At the Tatsuishi estate, Koji tries to reassure Kaya that they can rebuild the Saimori family, but she angrily shrugs him off. After Miyo thanks Kiyoka for rescuing her, they run into Koji, who informs Miyo that he will be leaving for his training in the old capital. Miyo and Kiyoka return home and make their engagement official. Sometime later, Miyo meets Kiyoka's older sister Hazuki, who becomes her tutor when Miyo decides to be re-educated as a proper lady. That night, Kiyoka finds Miyo having another nightmare, deducing that it is the Usuba ability. The next day, General Ookaito informs Kiyoka that the seal on the burial grounds containing Grotesqueries is broken. Elsewhere, Arata plans his next move.
8	8	"Nightmares and Ominous Shadows"; Transliteration: "Akumu to Fuon na Kage to" (Japanese: 悪夢と不穏な影と)	Kōji Furukuwa	Takahito Ōnishi	Takao Abo	August 23, 2023
Kiyoka, Ookaito and Kazushi are given an audience with Prince Takaihito, who reveals that the imperial capital will be invaded by the Grotesqueries. Soon after, Takaihito congratulates Kiyoka on his engagement with Miyo but gives him an ominous message. Meanwhile, Miyo learns the Western etiquettes for the upcoming party with Hazuki, but she begins to have nightmares and headaches that severely impact her daily life and her lessons. As Kiyoka worries about Miyo, he sends Iwashimizu to gather information on the Usuba family. Later, Kiyoka meets Arata for the discussion about the investigation. That night, Kiyoka and his subordinates encounter the Grotesqueries and destroy them. The next morning, Miyo encounters Arata when she suddenly collapses during her training day with Hazuki and Yurie.
9	9	"Drowning in Dreams"; Transliteration: "Yume ni Oborete" (Japanese: 夢に溺れて)	Yūki Koike	Ami Satō	Yūki Koike	August 30, 2023
Kiyoka quickly returns home to find Miyo resting with Hazuki by her side. Kiyoka and Hazuki both discuss regarding Miyo's nightmares. Sometime later, Kiyoka is informed of the Grotesqueries' attack on the civilians. Meanwhile, when Hazuki asks Miyo about her ideal life, Miyo replies that she wanted to be with Kiyoka. Elsewhere, Kiyoka discusses with Iwashimizu about the investigation on the Usubas. Later that night, Kiyoka comforts Miyo over her loneliness and reassures he will be there for her. The next day, Miyo is visited by Arata, who comes to see Kiyoka, and is given an offer to leave Kiyoka. After Kiyoka is put in charge on protecting the capital from the Grotesqueries, he is confronted by Arata over his supposed treatment towards Miyo. Kiyoka becomes shocked when he is told about her sudden collapse the other day. Afterwards, Kiyoka receives information from Iwashimizu about a woman named "Sumi Tsuruki", discovering that she had the same surname as Arata's. He hurries back to find Miyo in the kitchen where she passes out in his arms. Kiyoka takes her with him while on his way to confront Arata.
10	10	"Summer Cherry Blossoms, and the Mistake"; Transliteration: "Natsu no Sakura, Soshite Ayamachi" (Japanese: 夏の桜、そして過ち)	Yuki Kanazawa	Takahito Ōnishi	Takahiro Kawanami, Takehiro Kubota & Yuka Kuroda	September 6, 2023
Kiyoka and Miyo arrive at the Usuba mansion. There, Arata fully introduces himself as Arata Usuba, Miyo's cousin. He explains that the cause of Miyo's nightmares is actually her spiritual gift. Kiyoka and Miyo are then introduced to the head of the Usubas, Yoshirou Usuba. Yoshirou offers Kiyoka his help if Kiyoka is willing to let Miyo stay with her maternal family. Yoshirou explains that Miyo has the ability to intervene in a person's dreams and because of that, she will continue to have nightmares. When Kiyoka refuses to leave Miyo behind, Arata tells Kiyoka he should focus on the Grotesqueries' impending invasion on the capital before he challenges him to a duel. Kiyoka has the upper hand until he is distracted by Arata's illusion of Miyo and loses the match. As a result, Miyo is taken under the care of her family. Despite his defeat, Kiyoka swears that he will get Miyo back once he deals with the situation. Back at the Usuba mansion, Yoshirou is about to tell Miyo about how her mother married into the Saimori family and why she sealed away Miyo's spiritual powers.
11	11	"My Mother's Legacy"; Transliteration: "Haha ga Nokoshita Mono" (Japanese: 母が遺したもの)	Takushi Koide	Ami Satō	Tomohiko Itō	September 13, 2023
Yoshirou explains that years before Miyo was born, the family business was in debt. When the Saimori family approached the Usubas, they offered their assistance if Sumi married Shinichi, which Sumi accepted against Yoshirou's wishes. As a result, she was estranged from her family. Yoshirou also explains to Miyo about her supernatural ability, the Dream-Sight. When Miyo uses her powers, she discovers that her mother sealed away her powers to protect her from exploitation. Sometime later, Arata explains to Miyo about her duty as the Maiden of the Dream-Sight along with his duty to protect her. Meanwhile, Kiyoka and his subordinates fight off the Grotesqueries. However, he ends up unconscious when he protects Godou by taking the Grotesquerie's attack. The next day, Miyo has a conversation with Yoshirou who feels grateful for meeting her and tells her to depend on him and Arata as a family. Soon after the sealing on Miyo's powers is lifted, but she becomes shocked as she is informed of Kiyoka's condition. When she wishes to see Kiyoka again, Arata reveals to Miyo that the Emperor wants her to stay with the Usubas permanently because of her existence and ability. Despite the consequences, Yoshirou allows Miyo to leave and Arata takes her to Kiyoka.
12	12	"Light in the Darkness"; Transliteration: "Kurayami no Naka no Hikari" (Japanese: 暗闇の中の光)	Takehiro Kubota	Takahito Ōnishi	Takao Abo & Takehiro Kubota	September 20, 2023
When Miyo decides to uses her powers to save Kiyoka, she confronts her other self who represents her unhappiness and trauma in the dream world. When Miyo's other self attempts to dissaude her, Miyo swears that she will not run away and promises that she will live a happy life with Kiyoka. Soon after, using Kiyoka's kumihimo as her guide, Miyo manages to find him in an endless battle against the Grotesqueries. Elsewhere, the Emperor is informed of Miyo's attempt to rescue Kiyoka. When the Emperor tries to destroy Miyo and Kiyoka in the dream world, their combined power overwhelms and defeats him as the Grotesqueries are destroyed. After Miyo and Kiyoka are awake, Arata reassures her that she is still part of the Usuba family while Kiyoka tells him that they will have a rematch someday. Ookaito learns of the Emperor's actions for releasing the Grotesqueries while Prince Takaihito plans to have his father atone for his crimes in the future. Miyo and Kiyoka return to their daily lives. Several days later, they both attend the party.
13	13 (OVA)	"The Shape of My Happiness"; Transliteration: "Watashi no Shiawase no Katachi" (Japanese: わたしの幸せのかたち)	Naoya Murakawa & Takehiro Kubota	Momoka Toyoda	Masayuki Kojima	March 15, 2024
Miyo attends the party with Kiyoka. There, Hazuki introduces Miyo to her son Asahi, who seemingly dislikes Miyo. After Miyo converses with the guests, Kiyoka brings her to meet Prince Takaihito. Takaihito explains the real reason why his father, the Emperor, was involved in the incidents between the Saimoris and the Usubas. When Takaihito apologizes to Miyo for everything that happened to her, she tells him she is happy to be with Kiyoka. After the conversation with Takaihito, Miyo bumps into Asahi and Hazuki suspects Asahi's behavior with Miyo. When Asahi confesses that he is jealous of Miyo because she spends too much time with his mother, Hazuki reassures him that she loves him. As a result, Asahi apologizes to Miyo for his behavior. The next day, Arata comes to visit Kiyoka and Miyo to make a proposal of becoming Miyo's bodyguard. Soon after, Miyo watches Kiyoka leave for work as she hopes for their happiness.

=== Season 2 (2025) ===
No. overall	No. in season	Title	Directed by	Written by	Storyboarded by	Original release date
14	1	"Another Kudo Residence"; Transliteration: "Mō Hitotsu no Kudō-ke" (Japanese: もう一つの久堂家)	Masayuki Kojima	Ami Satō	Masayuki Kojima	January 6, 2025
Miyo wakes up from a foreboding dream and ponders about the meaning behind her dreams. Soon after, Miyo goes shopping with Kiyoka and Hazuki. She suddenly feels someone watching her right before she encounters Tadakiyo Kudou, Kiyoka and Hazuki's father. Tadakiyo informs Kiyoka about the Grotesqueries' appearances in the countryside and wants him to investigate. Though Kiyoka argues about Tadakiyo's retirement, he is then given a personal request from Prince Takaihito. The next day, Miyo goes with Kiyoka to visit his parents. After they arrive at the villa, Miyo meets Fuyu, Kiyoka's mother. Fuyu however does not accept Miyo as Kiyoka's fiancée and insults her in front of Kiyoka, much to his anger. During their time at the village, Kiyoka apologizes to Miyo for what happened with his mother as he becomes concerned about her. Miyo reassures Kiyoka that she wishes to bond with Fuyu and asks him to watch over her, which he understands and allows her to do so. Meanwhile, Arata is given an audience with Prince Takaihito and is entrusted with an urgent mission.
15	2	"A New Ordeal"; Transliteration: "Arata na Shiren" (Japanese: 新たな試練)	Yūki Koike	Fūka Ishii	Masayuki Kojima	January 13, 2025
The next morning, Fuyu, who is unhappy with Kiyoka's engagement, assigns Miyo to perform housekeeping duties. When Fuyu finds out that Miyo did not give up, she confronts Miyo and insults her once more. Miyo, however, remains unfazed, expressing her determination to stay by Kiyoka's side. Frustrated, Fuyu attempts to strike Miyo, but Tadakiyo stops and berates her. As Tadakiyo escorts her, Fuyu tells Miyo that she does not have the responsibility for the Kudou family. Meanwhile, Kiyoka investigates an abandoned building where he discovers lab experiments and a black cloak with the emblem. He then encounters a suspicious cloaked man and subdues him. The man claims that he is bestowed upon by the founder before he kills himself. After his investigation, Kiyoka has a conversation with Miyo. The next day, Miyo tries to speaks with Fuyu but Fuyu coldly ignores her. Later, a young villager is brought to the Kudou villa. He warns that the village is under attack right before he suddenly collapses. While Kiyoka is on his way to the village, Miyo attempts to use her Dream-Sight on the young villager but is stopped by Arata's sudden appearance.
16	3	"The Gifted Communion and Demons"; Transliteration: "Inō Shinkyō to Oni" (Japanese: 異能心教と鬼)	Sōtarō Shimizu	Minori Hashiba	Takehiro Kubota	January 20, 2025
Kiyoka arrives to the abandoned building where he is confronted by a man named Houjou. Kiyoka fights a Grotesquerie while Tadakiyo deals with two more followers. After Kiyoka defeats the Grotesquerie, he and his father discover that a villager was forced to turn into one through unknown methods. Meanwhile, with Arata's help, Miyo enters inside the dream and saves the young villager's life. Following the crisis, Kiyoka informs Arata about the Gifted Communion, a religious cult led by Naoshi Usui. Arata reveals to Miyo and Kiyoka that Usui shares the Usuba blood. Later, Miyo has her first kiss with Kiyoka under the moonlight. The next day, Miyo is visited by Fuyu who gives her a stern lecture while slightly acknowledging her determination as Kiyoka's fiancee. She gives Miyo a ribbon as a gift before she leaves. Miyo leaves the Kudou villa with Kiyoka and Arata. But when they return to the capital, they encounter Usui.
17	4	"What the Autumn Breeze Brought"; Transliteration: "Akikaze ga Hakondekita Mono" (Japanese: 秋風が運んできたもの)	Kōji Furukuwa	Momoka Toyoda	Kōji Furukuwa	January 27, 2025
After Miyo, Kiyoka, and Arata meet Usui in person, Usui tells Miyo that he will come for her before he disappears. Due to Miyo being Usui's possible target, Kiyoka assigns Kaoruko Jinnouchi as her bodyguard. As Kaoruko gives Miyo a tour, Miyo watches Kaoruko having a sparring match at the dojo while having a conversation with Mukadeyama, Kaoruko's superior. Miyo begins to understand the soldiers' treatment towards her, not only because she is a woman but because of her connection to the Usubas. Meanwhile, Arata talks with Yoshirou about Usui. That night, Kiyoka watches the moonlight with Miyo while he recalls his past conversation with his father regarding his feelings for Miyo. Later, Miyo finds herself in a dream where she sees her mother chastising Usui when they were children. The next day, Kaoruko helps Miy clean up the kitchen. At the infirmary, Kazushi visits Godou, who is injured from the raid on the Gifted Communion, just as Godou is surprised to find out about Kaoruko.
18	5	"Deep Within the Heart"; Transliteration: "Kokoro no Oku wa" (Japanese: 心の奥は)	Hao Can Yuan	Minori Hashiba	Masayuki Kojima	February 3, 2025
Miyo overhears three soldiers disparaging Kaoruko and defends her. When one of them, Kaoruko's sparring partner, angrily attempts to strike Miyo, he is stopped by Kaoruko. Miyo cheers Karouko up by having tea with homemade sweets. Later, Miyo and Kiyoka visit Godou where Miyo meets Jakuji Unan, the infirmary doctor. When they come to see Godou, Kiyoka quickly excuses himself just before Godou tells Miyo about Kiyoka's past. Miyo then is surprised to find out that Kaoruko used to be Kiyoka's fiancée. After visiting Godou, Kiyoka opens up to Miyo. The next day, Miyo suddenly wakes up from another foreboding dream. Later, Kaoruko confides to Miyo about her feelings for Kiyoka and how she is poorly treated due to being a woman. As a result, Miyo comforts Kaoruko and tells her that she still wants to be friends with her. Meanwhile, Arata discovers the Gifted Communion kidnaps the Emperor and sends a shikigami to warn Kiyoka. After Kiyoka leaves to help Arata, Miyo is left under the protection by Mukadeyama, Kaoruko and the other soldiers. However, Usui suddenly appears before them.
19	6	"The Man Called Naoshi Usui"; Transliteration: "Usui Naoshi Toiu Otoko" (Japanese: 甘水直という男)	Masayuki Kojima	Fūka Ishii	Masayuki Kojima	February 10, 2025
Kiyoka and his soldiers meet up with Arata. When they are about to rescue the Emperor, however, Ookaito arrives and warns Kiyoka that Miyo is in danger. Usui has Miyo and the others trapped and exposes Kaoruko as the traitor. After Kaorouko confesses why she did it, she realizes that she had been tricked. Mukadeyama suddenly finds his soldiers attacking each other. He tries to attack Usui but finds himself caught in an illusion before Usui wounds him. Kaoruko protects Miyo as she fights Usui, but is overwhelmed. Usui urges Miyo to come with him, but she refuses. Usui then attempts to take her with him by force, Kiyoka intervenes, forcing Usui to retreat. Following the incident, Arata asks Ookaito for permission to investigate alone. Afterwards, he is suddenly approached by Usui. Mukadeyama apologizes to Miyo for his judgement towards her and praises her bravery for confronting Usui. Later, Miyo and Kiyoka celebrate an end of the year party with Hazuki, Yurie, Godou and Arata. Miyo soon receives a surprise visit from Kaoruko, who informs Miyo that she was given a minor punishment. She then tearfully asks Miyo to be her friend, which Miyo happily accepts.
20	7	"A New Year's Commotion"; Transliteration: "Toshiake, Zawameki" (Japanese: 年明け、ざわめき)	Kōji Furukuwa	Momoka Toyoda	Tomohiko Itō	February 17, 2025
Prince Takaihito and Ookaito discuss the Emperor's disappearance. Meanwhile, Miyo and Kiyoka make their first shrine visit where they soon after witness an ominous public demonstration held by the supporters of the Gifted Communion. While Godou and his subordinates arrive to arrest them, Kiyoka gives Miyo a shikigami as her protection. Later, Kiyoka discusses with Ookaito and Godou about the Gifted Communion's influence on the capital. Miyo once again dreams of her mother and Usui, but suddenly wakes up when Usui notices her presence. Miyo and Kiyoka begin to stay at the imperial palace as he has assigned to protect Prince Takaihito. Hazuki, Yurie and Arata join to keep Miyo company. Miyo discusses with Arata about her recent dreams as he explains that she has not yet awaken the power of the Dream-Sight. Kiyoka and Godou discuss with Kaoruko, who communicates with them by using a mirror, about Usui.
21	8	"An Evening Banquet and Distant Snow"; Transliteration: "Yoru no Utage to Enbō ni Utsuru Yuki" (Japanese: 夜の宴と遠望に映る雪)	Hao Can Yuan	Minori Hashiba	Masatsugu Arakawa	February 24, 2025
Prince Takaihito has an imperial meeting with the ministers and suggests on focusing on protecting the imperial palace. That night, Hazuki invites Miyo on a ladies' night party with Yurie, Kaoruko, and Prince Takaihito, who prefers to be addressed as "Lady Takako". After the party, Takaihito talks with Miyo alone before he gives her an omnious warning. While Miyo grows concerned about Kiyoka, she and Arata are approached by Hasebe, the minister of Education. Hasebe attempts to make an offer for the Usuba's powers but Arata angrily rejects and demands Hasebe to leave. Takakura, the prince's close aide, arrives and tells the minister to refrain his actions. Later, Miyo and Kiyoka find only one futon and reluctantly decide to sleep together. They both have a conversation about having romantic feelings. Miyo suddenly ends up looking at Kiyoka face to face but she moves away. He tells Miyo that he will be here when she is ready.
22	9	"Dream Tidings"; Transliteration: "Yume no Shirase" (Japanese: 夢のしらせ)	Takehiro Kubota	Ami Satō	Takehiro Kubota	March 3, 2025
After capturing a Grotesquerie, Kiyoka has Unan examine the body. They find a sphere containing something inside. Meanwhile, Miyo finds herself inside Usui's dream. After she quickly wakes up, Miyo, along with Hazuki and Yurie, hears gunshots and finds Hasebe's secretary with two dead imperial guards. While Yurie goes to find help, Hazuki urges Miyo to escape but the secretary incapacitates Hazuki and goes after Miyo. He then transforms into a Grotesquerie. Later, Kazushi helps Kiyoka as he unseals the sphere that contains claws of a Grotesquerie. Unan theorizes of how humans can transform into Grotesqueries by using certain materials. When Yurie brings help and finds Hazuki injured, Hazuki sends a shikigami to warn Kiyoka. Hasebe conspires with Usui after the minister of the army is assassinated. As Miyo refuses to scream for help, Kiyoka nonetheless rescues her. Kazushi removes the sphere from the Grotesquerie's body and Kiyoka delivers the finishing blow. Miyo tries to warn Kiyoka, but watches in horror as he is wounded with two gunshots by Arata. Before he is taken away, Kiyoka proclaims his love to Miyo.
23	10	"Promise"; Transliteration: "Yakusoku" (Japanese: 約束)	Kōji Furukuwa	Ami Satō	Kōji Furukuwa	March 10, 2025
Miyo is informed that Kiyoka has been held captive in the army headquarters. She attempts to rescue him on her own but is stopped by a young boy, who reveals himself to be Kiyoka's shikigami. He suggests Miyo on visiting the Usuba family in order to learn about Usui. After Takakura secretly helps Miyo leave the palace grounds, Miyo names Kiyoka's shikigami "Kiyo". At the Usuba residence, Yoshirou tells Miyo about Usui's past, revealing that the Usubas initially planned to seal Usui's opinokinesis due to being powerful and dangerous to those around him until he became close to Sumi. That night, Miyo witnesses her mother's memories with Usui in her dreams whereas she begins to understand Usui's feelings for Sumi and how he was affected by her death. The next day, Miyo finally awakens her Dream-Sight, unquestionably determined to stop Usui.
24	11	"A Resolute Departure"; Transliteration: "Ketsui no Shuttatsu" (Japanese: 決意の出立)	Sōtarō Shimizu	Fūka Ishii & Minori Hashiba	Sōtarō Shimizu	March 17, 2025
An imprisoned Kiyoka accuses Arata for his betrayal just as Arata only tells him that his actions are for Miyo and the Usuba family. Meanwhile, Miyo enlists the help from the Special Anti-Grotesquerie Unit, Tadakiyo and Kazushi, who volunteers to help her rescue Kiyoka. Later, Hasebe confronts Usui over Takaihito's intact authority before Houjou burns him. The next day, Godou, Mukadeyama and the rest of the soldiers fight against the Gifted Communion while Miyo, Kazushi and Kiyo successfully infiltrate the headquarters. They enter the prison where they discover an orb being used as a barrier to prevent them from using their spiritual abilities. Kazushi attempts to dispel the barrier but the Grotesquerie suddenly appears. Kiyo distracts the demon only to be wounded by it. Miyo then quickly runs away as the Grotesquerie chases after her. Kiyoka saves Miyo as he destroys it with his pyrokinetic power after Kazushi manages to destroy the barrier. After Miyo reunites with Kiyoka, Kiyo reverts back into a shikigami as his role to protect Miyo is complete. After rescuing Kiyoka, Kazushi and Tadakiyo join the battle against the Gifted Communion while Miyo and Kiyoka finally confront Usui with Arata by his side.
25	12	"Feelings Beyond Dreams"; Transliteration: "Yume no Saki ni Aru Omoi" (Japanese: 夢の先にある想い)	Masayuki Kojima & Kōji Furukuwa	Ami Satō	Masayuki Kojima	March 31, 2025 (Note: Due to production delays, episode 25 was postponed by one week.)
Kiyoka fights Usui but falls victim to Usui's opinokinesis. Miyo tries to help Kiyoka but is stopped by Arata. She then has a vision of Arata and Usui killing each other. In order to prevent it from happening, Miyo uses her powers and transfers everyone to the dream world. There, Miyo tries to urge Usui to stop hurting people and tells him that her mother only wanted for him to find his own happiness, but her words fail to reach him. Usui attacks Miyo and Kiyoka, but Sumi intervenes. When he frantically tells her what his plan is, Sumi rejects it. Shattered by her words, Usui stabs himself in order to leave the dream world by force. When Miyo returns back to reality, she sees Usui overuse his powers just before Arata shoots Usui twice. Consequently, Arata is wounded by Usui's knife while Usui succumbs to his wounds, joining Sumi's spirit in the afterlife. As Arata is taken for medical treatment, Miyo laments over her failure but Kiyoka comforts her, reassuring her that she did everything she could.
26	13	"Once Spring Has Come"; Transliteration: "Haru ni Nattara..." (Japanese: 春になったら...)	Takehiro Kubota & Hao Can Yuan	Minori Hashiba	Hideki Futamura, Nina & Aya Takahashi	April 9, 2025 (Note: Due to production delays, episode 26 was postponed by nine days.)
Following the death of Usui, the series of incidents with the Gifted Communion had ended. Kiyoka decides to resign as commander of the Special Anti-Grotesquerie Unit and plans to entrust his role to Godou due to his success on rescuing the Emperor. At the infirmary, Miyo visits Arata, who reveals his reason why he joined the Gifted Communion before he killed Usui. Afterwards, Miyo is given a wedding kimono from Hazuki and Fuyu before going on a date with Kiyoka. When they return home, Takakura visits Miyo and Kiyoka, offering Miyo to use her Dream-Sight and serve under Prince Takaihito. The next day, Godou discusses with Kiyoka while he is unsure of becoming the new commander, but Kiyoka convinces him otherwise. That night, Kiyoka informs Miyo that he decides to retire from military to be with her. The following day, Miyo is given an audience with Prince Takaihito where she informs him that she only wishes to be with Kiyoka, which Takaihito allows her to do so. Soon after, Kiyoka proposes to Miyo in marriage, which she happily accepts. The following day, they plan to plant a cherry blossom tree at their garden to celebrate their marriage.

== Home media release ==
Kadokawa Video (Japan – Region 2/A)
Vol.	Episodes	Release date	Ref.
Season 1
1	1–4	November 29, 2023	
2	5–8	December 22, 2023	
3	9–12	January 24, 2024	
Season 2
1	14–18	May 28, 2025	
2	19–22	June 25, 2025	
3	23–26	July 25, 2025	
