= Keisuke Shinohara =

Keisuke Shinohara (Japanese: 篠原 敬介, Hepburn: Shinohara Keisuke, 12 June 1959 – 17 August 2011) was a Japanese television and film composer. His work can be seen in such films as Arashi no Yoru ni and Piano no Mori. He died in 2011 at the age of 52.

== Filmography ==
- Piano no Mori (2007)
- Arashi no Yoru ni (2005)
- Kenkaku Shobai Specials- Episode #1.1 (1998)
- Concrete-Encased High School Girl Murder Case: Broken Seventeen-Year-Olds (1995)
- Einstein Roman (1991)
