= Arashi no Yoru ni =

Japanese children's media series

- Gabu and Mei from the movie One Stormy Night (Arashi no Yoru Ni)

あらしのよるに (Stormy Night)
- Genre: Drama, Adventure
- Novel
- Written by: Yūichi Kimura
- Illustrated by: Hiroshi Abe
- Published by: Kodansha
- Published: 1994
- Anime film
- Directed by: Gisaburō Sugii
- Produced by: Toshiaki Nakazawa; Daisuke Ōoka; Yasushi Umemura; Atsumi Tashiro
- Written by: Yūichi Kimura; Gisaburō Sugii
- Music by: Keisuke Shinohara
- Studio: Group TAC
- Released: December 10, 2005
- Runtime: 107 minutes
- Anime television series

Arashi no Yoru ni: Himitsu no Tomodachi
- Directed by: Tetsurō Amino
- Produced by: Takuo Kumagai; Jun Takei; Shin Furukawa; Shinsaku Hatta
- Music by: Fumitaka Anzai
- Studio: Sparky Animation; Baku Enterprise; Daume (Cooperation)
- Original network: TV Tokyo
- Original run: April 4, 2012 – September 26, 2012
- Episodes: 26

Arashi no Yoru ni (あらしのよるに, lit. One Stormy Night) is the first in a series of children's books authored by Yūichi Kimura and illustrated by Hiroshi Abe. In 1995, the book won the 26th Kōdansha Literature Culture Award and the 42nd Sankei Children's Literature Culture Award.

When Arashi no Yoru ni was published in 1994, Kimura had no plans to continue the story as a series, but due to the popularity of the story and receiving considerable encouragement, he continued the story through five more books, ending with Fubuki no Ashita (ふぶきのあした, After the Snowstorm) in 2002. As the series became more popular, a compilation called Shiroi Yami no Hate de (しろいやみのはてで, At the End of White Darkness) was released in 2004 and a movie adaptation was produced. Soon after, Kimura wrote the seventh and last book, Mangetsu no Yoru ni (まんげつのよるに, One Full Moon Night).

Arashi no Yoru ni was published in Japanese textbooks by Mitsumura Tosho Publishing. In 2005, Gisaburō Sugii directed an animated film adaptation covering all seven books in the series. A CG-animated anime television series by Sparky Animation, Arashi no Yoru ni: Himitsu no Tomodachi (あらしのよるに ひみつのともだち, One Stormy Night: Secret Friends), began airing in Japan from April 4, 2012, to September 26, 2012.

== Plot ==
A goat named Mei wanders into a barn one night, seeking shelter from a storm. In the barn, the goat meets another refugee. The two can neither see nor smell each other, but nevertheless they huddle together, fending off the cold, and begin to talk. Eventually, they establish a friendship. The two decide to meet later and will recognize each other by using the password "one stormy night". The next day, when they meet, Mei learns that his companion from the night before was a wolf named Gabu. Despite their natural predisposition as enemies, they share a common bond and begin meeting regularly. However, Mei's flock and Gabu's pack eventually find out about their relationship and forbid the friendship. In a truly underhanded tactic, the pack and flock attempt to force Mei and Gabu to use each other to get information on their enemies. Mei and Gabu, no longer wanting to be bound by their respective clans' unjust regulations and hoping to preserve their friendship, cross a river during a storm. They hope to find an "emerald forest" free from persecution.

However, Giro, the leader of Gabu's pack, holds a vendetta against goats and views Gabu as a traitor to all wolves. Giro and his pack begin to hunt down the two companions. Gabu and Mei reach the summit of a mountain where they stop and rest, exhausted from fighting their way through a snowstorm. Mei, knowing that Gabu has not eaten in days, offers to sacrifice himself as sustenance. Gabu reluctantly agrees initially, but soon realizes that no matter how hungry he is, he cannot eat his friend. Gabu hears his pack approaching and leaves Mei to face them, ready to defend his goat friend to the death. As Gabu is about to go face the wolf pack, there is an avalanche that sweeps them all away. The next morning, Mei digs through the snow blocking the cave and sees the "emerald forest" they had been searching for in the distance. Gabu is missing, but Mei finds him in another cave. Mei finds that Gabu has lost his memory of their friendship and all the events that preceded the avalanche due to the trauma of surviving that disaster, and Mei knows not how to undo the damage.

While waiting for the moon to come out, Gabu taunts Mei that he plans on eating him. Mei, saying that he wouldn't have minded being eaten by Gabu before, accuses the wolf of not being the Gabu he previously knew and deems him pathetic for not even attempting to remember his past. Disappointed and disillusioned, Mei shouts that had he known things would take this turn it would have been better if they had never met each other on "one stormy night". On hearing these words, Gabu's memory slowly returns in flashes before in a rapid burst. After regaining himself, Gabu turns to Mei and speaks his name as well as wondering why they are in the cave; having no recollection of his time while amnesiac. A stunned and overjoyed Mei, deciding it would not matter to tell Gabu about his amnesia, claims to have been waiting for Gabu this whole time and they happily reunite. In the end, Mei and Gabu both finally enjoy watching the moon as it rises, marveling at its beauty and swearing that their relationship will last forever no matter what.

== Book series ==
The picture book series, published by Kodansha, Ltd., has been released in Japanese in seven volumes.

1. Arashi no Yoru ni (あらしのよるに, One Stormy Night) (1994) ISBN 4-06-252852-5
2. Aru Hareta Hi ni (あるはれたひに, One Sunny Day) (1996) ISBN 4-06-252870-3
3. Kumo no Kirema ni (くものきれまに, One Cloudy Day) (1997) ISBN 4-06-252874-6
4. Kiri no Naka de (きりのなかで, One Foggy Afternoon) (1999) ISBN 4-06-252875-4
5. Doshaburi no Hi ni (どしゃぶりのひに, One Rainy Day) (2000) ISBN 4-06-252876-2
6. Fubuki no Ashita (ふぶきのあした, After the Snowstorm) (2002) ISBN 4-06-252877-0
7. Mangetsu no Yoru ni (まんげつのよるに, One Full Moon Night) (2005) ISBN 4-06-252878-9

== Characters ==
- Gabu (ガブ, Gabu), a wolf from the Bakubaku Valley.
- Mei (メイ, Mei), a goat from the Sawasawa Mountains. While the gender is unmentioned in the original books, Mei is depicted as a male goat in the film and a female goat in the TV series.
- Giro (ギロ, Giro), the boss of the Bakubaku Valley wolves and a best friend of Gabu's father. In the show, Gabu's father was leader of the clan before vanishing under unseen circumstances involving a rivalry with an invading pack; Giro, being the second-in-command, took over as Alpha and even took to raising Gabu as a pup
- Barry (バリー, Barī), a red-haired wolf and Giro's right-hand man. In the show, Barry is blue-furred and has a complicated relation with Gabu; often belittling him yet sometimes holding high expectations for him, has a sister named Lala who fancies the young wolf.
- Beach (ビッチ, Bicchi) and Zack (ザク, Zaku), a pair of twin wolves who love to fight and eat.
- Tap (タプ, Tapu), an overweight goat who acts as an older brother figure to Mei. In the show, he is more fit and has an open crush on Mei yet has a near impossible time making her aware of it; each time he tries to confess his feelings to her, he is constantly interrupted by circumstances beyond his control.
- Mii (ミイ), a pink-colored goat and a friend of Mei. She does not appear in the book series. In the film, it is heavily implied she has a hidden crush on Mei which he never notices. In the show, she is much younger and looks up to Mei as a big sister figure; never losing faith in her as a friend, even at the end.
- Elder Goat (長老, Chouro), the leader of the goats of the Sawasawa Mountains.
- Mei's Mother (メイの母, Mei no Haha), who attempted to save Mei from a group of wolves when he was a child, managing to bite off Giro's ear before being eaten. Though she is mentioned, she does not physically appear in the book series. In the show, she only bites off a piece of Giro's ear instead of the whole ear before being killed by the wolves.
- Mei's Grandmother (メイの祖母, Mei no Soba), who raised Mei after his mother was killed, and is later shocked when Mei befriends Gabu. She does not appear in the book series.
- Gabu's Mother (ガブの母, Gabu no Haha), she is mentioned. In both the movie and show, she is seen in Gabu's flashbacks.
- Garuru (ガルル, Garuru), Gabu's father. In the movie, he is only mentioned as being Giro's best friend. In the show he is given the name Garuru, he was also Giro's best friend while also being the original leader of the clan; disappearing under unknown circumstances, leaving Giro to take over the pack and raise Gabu in his stead.
- Boro (ボロ, Boro), a wolf pup. He is a student of Barry's, learning how to be a tracker. He does not appear in the book series. He idolizes Gabu, viewing him as a big brother and trying to emulate him whenever he can. Even after Gabu's secret friendship is revealed, although shocked, he does not lose his faith in Gabu.
- Lala (ララ, Rara), sister of Barry. She does not appear in the book series. She knew Gabu when he was a pup and sympathized with him, finding herself fond of his growing courage growing up. It is heavily implied she is in love with him now.
- Moro (ボロ, Moro), friend of Mei and Tap. He does not appear in the book series. He is an overweight goat who loves to eat, acting as a big brother figure to Tap and Mii. He is normally easygoing and uncaring of most troubles, more concerned with what he eats most of the time.

== Stage ==
Since 1997, Engekishūdan En has annually performed the story on the "En Kodomo Stage." Performers have included Yoshie Minami, Akio Kaneda, Rintarō Nishi, and Rieko Takahashi among others.

In 2004, Aoni Production sponsored the Voice Fair 2004's dramatization of Arashi no Yoru ni and Aru Hareta Hi ni, which starred Katsue Miwa as Mei and Minori Matsushima as Gabu.

In 2007, Yoshikazu Yokoyama directed the Engekishūdan Studio Life musical version, in which Sayaka Yoshino portrayed Mei.

== Media ==
=== Animated film ===
The film Arashi no Yoru Ni, directed by Gisaburō Sugii and animated by Group TAC, was released in Japan on December 10, 2005. The film stayed on the top 10 list for the Japanese box office for well over a month, with over 1,200,000 viewers in the first month alone. On January 20, 2006, "Arashi no Yoru Ni" was screened in Taiwan. Altogether, the film grossed over ¥1.8 billion. The Japanese DVD was released on June 23, 2006, as both a special edition and a standard edition. In 2007, the film was nominated for the Japan Academy Prize for Animation of the Year.

A small group of voice actors and sound engineers acquired permission from the original producers Tokyo Broadcasting System Television (TBS) to make a complete English dub of the Arashi no Yoru Ni movie for YouTube. The first part of the movie was uploaded on December 31, 2008, and was completed on November 5, 2009. On December 23, 2009, the team released an AC3 file which replaces the Japanese voice cast with an English voice cast. The team was unable to obtain the rights to the song Star by Aiko, the original theme song for the movie. The ending was replaced with the song "Watch the Moon Rise" written and performed by Tustin Gilmer Macafee under the name MFE. The vast majority of the voice acting is also done by Tustin Gilmer Macafee, with him and the rest of the cast being under pseudonyms for privacy reasons.

==== Credits ====
Cast
Character	Japanese	English
Mei	Hiroki Narimiya	Tustin Gilmer Macafee
Gabu	Shidou Nakamura II	Tustin Gilmer Macafee
Tap	Shouzou Hayashiya IX	Tapper
Tap	Shouzou Hayashiya IX	Tustin Gilmer Macafee
Mii	Maya Kobayashi	Mina
Mii	Maya Kobayashi	Bethanie Spindler
Giro	Riki Takeuchi	Tustin Gilmer Macafee
Barry	Kouichi Yamadera	Tustin Gilmer Macafee
Beach	Tetsuya Yanagihara	Tustin Gilmer Macafee
Zack	Yoshiyuki Hirai	Tustin Gilmer Macafee
Kama	Mitsuaki Hoshino	
Toro	Akimitsu Takase	
Gari	Yasuyuki Kase	
Gori	Takahiro Yoshino	
Moro	Masamitsu Morita	
Grandmother goat	Kabachan	Tustin Gilmer Macafee
Elder goat	Eiji Bandou	Tustin Gilmer Macafee
Gabu's mother	Yuu Hayami	Shanaa Moreau
Mei's grandmother	Etsuko Ichihara	Tustin Gilmer Macafee

Other cast (English dub): Jarett Mauss, Luis Dirk Vardaman, Tustin Gilmer Macafee, Shanaa Moreau

Staff

- Original story: Yuuichi Kimura
- Director: Gisaburou Sugii
- Animation supervisor: Tsuneo Maeda
- Character design: Marisuke Eguchi
- Art director: Yukio Abe
- Music: Keisuke Shinohara
- Theme song: "Star" by Aiko

=== Drama CD ===
Sound Theater: Arashi no Yoru ni was released on December 22, 2006.

Cast
Character	Japanese
Narrator	Shigenori Souya
Mei	Akira Ishida
Gabu	Hiroaki Hirata
Tap	Kappei Yamaguchi
Giro	Juurouta Kosugi
Barry	Kazuya Nakai
Missus Goat	Noriko Suzuki
Elder Goat	Hiroshi Shirokuma
Goat 1	Ai Emi
Goat 2	Takayuki Nezu
Wolf 1	Jun Nakata
Wolf 2	Keiichi Takahashi

=== Anime television series ===
A CG-animated television series, Arashi no Yoru Ni: Himitsu no Tomodachi (あらしのよるに ひみつのともだち, One Stormy Night: Secret Friends), has been produced by Sparky Animation in co-operation with Duckbill Entertainment, Baku Enterprise and Bandai Visual and began airing in Japan on TV Tokyo from April 4, 2012, with both Japanese and English audio tracks. The opening theme is "Friendship Birthday" by Sea☆A whilst the ending theme is "Dear My Friend" by U-KISS. This animation is a co-production between Japan and Singapore. The animation has been conceived in Japan, then rewritten and adapted to English with pre-recorded voices. Afterwards, it was dubbed into Japanese. In contrast to the original books, where Mei was never given a specific gender and the feature movie which had Mei as a male goat, the television series casts Mei as female.

==== Episode list ====
No.	Title	Original release date
1	"One Stormy Night" "Arashi no Yoru Ni" (Japanese: あらしのよるに)	April 4, 2012
During one stormy night, a goat named Mei and a wolf named Gabu take shelter in an abandoned shack. Whilst the two are unable to see each other in the dark, they find they have a lot of things in common and spend the storm chatting away. They decide to meet up with each other for lunch the next day, surprised to find they are goat and wolf, but still deciding to be friends. However, Gabu has trouble resisting the urge to take a bite out of Mei, particularly when he ends up losing his lunch. At the end of the day, Gabu almost decides to eat Mei but holds back, asking to meet him again.
2	"Gabu, the Liar" "Usotsuki Gabu" (Japanese: うそつきガブ)	April 11, 2012
As Mei tricks his friend Mii in order to continue to hang out with Gabu, he feels guilty upon returning home and finding Mii had caught a fever. Mei learns of a plant that grows on top of a mountain in BakuBaku Valley that could help Mii. Gabu offers to go find it for him, despite the fact he is bad at climbing. Recalling a tune both he and Mei knew from childhood, Gabu gains the courage to recover the plant so that Mei can cure Mii.
3	"The Boss" "Ōkami no Bosu" (Japanese: オオカミのボス)	April 18, 2012
As Gabu has trouble keeping his friendship with Mei a secret from the other wolves, he inadvertently gives him the impression that he's the wolves' boss. Gabu ends up running late to meetup with Mei the next day because he's accompanied by another wolf named Bari (second in command of the wolf pack). Gabu learns that Mei is being targeted by the true wolf boss, Ghiro. Gabu rushes to get ahead of Giro, though finds May had already left by the time they get there. Worrying that Mei would no longer be friends with him because he was late, Gabu is relieved to learn that Mei just left because his friends came to find him.
4	"Playing Wolf and Goat" "Ōkami to Yagi Gokko" (Japanese: オオカミとヤギごっこ)	April 25, 2012
Mei and Gabu meet up as usual, but Gabu is extremely hungry. Mei tries to divert his attention by playing games, namely, a game in switching roles. Mei is a wolf; Gabu is goat. Meanwhile, Zak and Butch (wolves) tell Bari about a "legendary white wolf." Bari, of course, doesn't believe it. As they go about in search for food, they come across a white goat who is pretending to a wolf! And the legend becomes real.
5	"Very Special Friends" "Tomodachi no Uta" (Japanese: ともだちのうた)	May 2, 2012
The migrating swallows of spring have arrived, singing news from all around. When Mei and Gabu are overheard singing "I'm the wind" together by the swallows Pippi and Chicchi, the two birds start singing a new song that threatens to reveal Mei and Gabu's secret unless Mei and Gabu can convince them not to.

==== Credits ====
Cast
Character	Japanese	English
Mei	Rie Kugimiya	Terry Osada Gerri Sorrells (young)
Gabu	Hiroyuki Yoshino	Jack Merluzzi
Tap	Tatsuhisa Suzuki	Jeff Manning
Mii	Yui Horie	Rumiko Varnes
Moro	Hisafumi Oda	
Giro	Kouichi Yamadera	Jeff Manning
Barry	Kouichi Yamadera	Tom Clark
Lala	Masumi Asano	
Zack	Tetsuya Yanagihara	Jack Merluzzi
Boro	Meguru Takahashi	Maya Jones
Beach	Anri Katsu	Butch
Beach	Anri Katsu	Jeff Manning

In addition to occasional name changes: Mei, Giro, and Zack have the spelling of their names changed to May, Ghiro, and Zak, respectively.

Staff

- Director: Tetsurou Amino

Staff (English version)

- Producer: Jim Weatherford
- Director: Gerri Sorrells
- Writer: Gerri Sorrells
