= Makoto Isshiki =

Japanese manga artist

- Area: Manga artist
- Pseudonym: Kōsuke Muku
- Notable works: Forest of Piano, Hanada Shōnen-shi
- Awards: The 19th Kodansha Manga Award, Grand Prize for Manga

Makoto Isshiki (Japanese: 一色まこと, Hepburn: Isshiki Makoto) is a Japanese manga artist. She is best known for her series Forest of Piano, which has been adapted as an anime film and received the Grand Prize for manga at the 2008 Japan Media Arts Festival. She won the 1994 Kodansha Manga Award for general manga for Hanada Shōnen-shi, which has also been adapted as both an anime television series and a live-action film. From November 2021 to August 2022, Isshiki worked with Takashi Nagasaki on Child from the Dark, based on Nagasaki's novel Yomi Nemuru Mori -Daigo Shinji no Hakuran Suiri File-. Isshiki was credited as "Kōsuke Muku" (椋洸介) during the manga's serialization in Big Comic, but is credited by her real name in its tankōbon.

== Selected works ==
- Denaoshitoide! – Big Comic Spirits, 1988–95, 6 volumes
- Hanada Shōnen-shi ("The Chronicles of Young Hanada") – Mr. Magazine, 1993–95, 4 + 1 volumes
- Hassuru – Big Comic Spirits, 1996–97, 6 volumes
- Gyojin-Sou kara Ai wo Komete ("With Love from Gyojin Inn") – Shōnen Jump Deluxe, 1998, 1 volume
- Forest of Piano ("Piano Forest") – Young Magazine Uppers, Weekly Morning, 1998–2015, 26 volumes
- Child from the Dark (闇の少年, Aida no Shōnen) – Written by Takashi Nagasaki, Big Comic, 2021–2022, 2 volumes
- 13-nichi ni wa Hana wo Kazatte – Big Comic Original Zokan, 2023–present
