= Forest of Piano =

Japanese manga series

- First tankōbon volume cover

ピアノの森 –The perfect world of KAI– (Piano no Mori)
- Genre: Musical
- Manga
- Written by: Makoto Isshiki
- Published by: Kodansha
- English publisher: Kodansha Comics
- Magazine: Young Magazine Uppers; (1998–2004); Weekly Morning; (2004–2015)
- Original run: 1998 – 2015
- Volumes: 26
- Anime film
- Directed by: Masayuki Kojima
- Written by: Ryuta Hourai
- Music by: Keisuke Shinohara
- Studio: Madhouse
- Released: July 21, 2007
- Runtime: 101 minutes
- Anime television series
- Directed by: Gaku Nakatani (S1); Ryūtarō Suzuki (S1); Hiroyuki Yamaga (S2)
- Written by: Mika Abe; Aki Itami (S1)
- Music by: Harumi Fuuki
- Studio: Gaina (Note: Fukushima Gainax was renamed Gaina on August 9, 2018 after Kinoshita Group Holdings acquired the studio.)
- Licensed by: Netflix
- Original network: NHK General TV
- Original run: April 8, 2018 – April 14, 2019
- Episodes: 24
- Manga

Totonō Oto: Mō Hitotsu no Piano no Mori
- Written by: Makoto Isshiki
- Published by: Kodansha
- Magazine: Weekly Morning
- Original run: December 26, 2024 – present
- Volumes: 3
- icon

Forest of Piano, known in Japan as Piano no Mori: The Perfect World of Kai (Japanese: ピアノの森 –The perfect world of KAI–), is a Japanese manga series written and illustrated by Makoto Isshiki. It was serialized by Kodansha from 1998 to 2015, initially in Young Magazine Uppers before transferring to Weekly Morning. The serialization was irregular, and went on hiatus in 2002 before resuming in 2006. The series ended after 26 bound volumes. The series was adapted into a 2007 Japanese animated feature film by director Masayuki Kojima and production company Madhouse. The film featured performances by the renowned pianist Vladimir Ashkenazy. An anime television series adaptation produced by Gaina aired from April 2018 to April 2019 on NHK.

== Plot ==
Forest of Piano is a story that follows Kai Ichinose, a boy who lives in the red light district but escapes at night to play the piano in the forest. Shuhei Amamiya, the grade-school son of a professional pianist, transfers to Moriwaki Elementary, Kai's elementary school. But it doesn't take long before Shuhei is picked on by the class bullies, and gets involved in a dare to play the mysterious piano in the forest, leading to his meeting with Kai, who seems to be the only one capable of getting sound out of the thought-to-be broken piano. Kai's ability earns him the respect of Shuhei and his music teacher, former master pianist Sosuke Ajino. Both Shuhei and Ajino try to get Kai to take proper piano lessons, but Kai is at first resistant to refining his piano-playing technique. However, after hearing Sosuke play a Chopin piece he just can't seem to play himself, he relents.

== Characters ==
Kai Ichinose (一ノ瀬 海, Ichinose Kai)
Voiced by: Soma Saito, Ryoko Shiraishi (young) (Japanese); Johnny Yong Bosch (English)
Kai is the son of a prostitute. He is an elementary school student who often plays the mysterious piano in the forest. He has the ability to instantly remember any piano piece he hears and play it back perfectly. In the future, he is a renowned pianist.
Sōsuke Ajino (阿字野壮介, Ajino Sōsuke)
Voiced by: Junichi Suwabe (Japanese); Kyle McCarley (English)
Sosuke is the music teacher at Kai and Shuhei's school. In his youth he was a famous pianist who won several awards for his playing, however his career was abruptly ended after an accident injured his left hand and killed his fiance. After discovering Kai's affinity for the piano, he becomes his coach.
Shūhei Amamiya (雨宮修平, Amamiya Shūhei)
Voiced by: Natsuki Hanae, Yō Taichi (young) (Japanese); Griffin Burns (English)
Shuhei is a transfer student from Tokyo who makes quick friends with Kai following their love for the piano.
Wei Pang (パン・ウェイ, Pan Uey)
Voiced by: Yuichi Nakamura (Japanese); Griffin Puatu (English)
A Chinese pianist studying abroad in Poland. He is one of the participants in the International Chopin Piano Competition and is favored to win. His piano style sounds eerily similar to Ajino's before his accident.
Lech Szymanowski (レフシマノフキ, Ref Shimanofuki)
Voiced by: Kenn (Japanese); Tristan Wright (English)
A Polish pianist and one of the participants in the International Chopin Piano Competition. He is often called the "New Star of Poland".
Takako Maruyama (丸山誉子, Maruyama Takako)
Voiced by: Aoi Yūki, Mayuko Fukuda (Japanese); Cristina Vee (English)
Takako appears as one of the participants at the regional piano competition. She was inspired by Kai to become a better pianist.
Sophie Ormesson (ソフィ・オルメッソン, Soffi Orumeson)
Voiced by: Mariya Ise (Japanese); Erika Harlacher (English)
Karol Adamski (カロル・アダムスキ, Karoru Adamusuki)
Voiced by: Katsuyuki Konishi (Japanese); Doug Erholtz (English)
Namie Amamiya (雨宮奈美恵, Amamiya Namie)
Voiced by: Marie Miyake (Japanese); Julie Ann Taylor (English)
Namie is Shuhei's mother.

== Development ==
Makoto Isshiki was inspired to write Forest of Piano when she watched a documentary showing Stanislav Bunin winning the International Frédéric Chopin Piano Competition in 1985.

== Media ==
=== Manga ===
Forest of Piano is written and illustrated by Makoto Isshiki. It was published by Kodansha in Japan, who first serialized the series in the seinen manga magazine Young Magazine Uppers from 1998 to 2004, and later in Weekly Morning from 2004 to 2015. The series was published into 26 tankōbon volumes, with the first volume being released on August 6, 1999, and the final volume released on December 22, 2015.

The series is licensed by Sharp Point Press in Taiwan. Kodansha Comics acquired the series for publication in English, and are releasing the volumes digitally.

A spin-off manga titled Totonō Oto: Mō Hitotsu no Piano no Mori (もうひとつのピアノの森 整う音) began serialization in Weekly Morning on December 26, 2024. The series has been published into three tankōbon volumes as of June 23, 2026.

==== Volumes ====
No.	Japanese release date	Japanese ISBN
01	August 6, 1999	978-4-06-346030-8
02	August 6, 1999	978-4-06-346031-5
03	October 8, 1999	978-4-06-346040-7
04	April 7, 2000	978-4-06-346056-8
05	August 7, 2000	978-4-06-346067-4
06	March 7, 2001	978-4-06-346097-1
07	September 7, 2001	978-4-06-346118-3
08	May 17, 2002	978-4-06-346142-8
09	November 8, 2002	978-4-06-346169-5
10	July 22, 2005	978-4-06-372449-3
11	December 22, 2005	978-4-06-372483-7
12	April 21, 2006	978-4-06-372509-4
13	December 22, 2006	978-4-06-372554-4
14	June 22, 2007	978-4-06-372610-7 (normal ed.); 978-4-06-364699-3 (limited ed.)
15	May 23, 2008	978-4-06-372675-6 (normal ed.); 978-4-06-362113-6 (limited ed.)
16	August 21, 2009	978-4-06-372752-4
17	March 23, 2010	978-4-06-372881-1
18	July 23, 2010	978-4-06-372917-7
19	November 22, 2010	978-4-06-372917-7
20	September 23, 2011	978-4-06-372980-1
21	November 22, 2011	978-4-06-387022-0
22	August 23, 2012	978-4-06-387099-2
23	May 23, 2013	978-4-06-387117-3
24	May 23, 2014	978-4-06-388324-4
25	October 23, 2014	978-4-06-388389-3
26	December 22, 2015	978-4-06-388485-2

==== Totonō Oto: Mō Hitotsu no Piano no Mori volumes ====
No.	Japanese release date	Japanese ISBN
01	June 23, 2025	978-4-06-539703-9
02	December 23, 2025	978-4-06-541712-6
03	June 23, 2026	978-4-06-543702-5

=== Anime ===
An anime television series adaptation produced by Gaina aired from April 8, 2018, to April 14, 2019, on NHK. The first season is directed by Gaku Nakatani. Ryūtarō Suzuki as the series director, Aki Itami and Mika Abe are in charge of series composition, and Sumie Kinoshita is handling character designs. Harumi Fuuki is composing the series' music. The anime was originally listed to air for 12 episodes, but was later announced to air for 24 episodes. The 24 episodes will air in two seasons, with the first season airing from April to July 2018, and the second season airing from January to April 2019. Hiroyuki Yamaga will take over as director for the second season, while most of the staff and cast will reprise their roles. Netflix have announced that they had acquired exclusive streaming rights for the series worldwide, and simulcast the series in Japan, and released the series globally in September 2018.

==== Season 1 ====
No. overall	No. in season	Title (Note: English titles are taken from Netflix.)	Original air date
1	1	"Chosen One"; Transliteration: "Erabareta Te" (Japanese: 選ばれた手)	April 8, 2018
2	2	"To play Chopin's Pieces"; Transliteration: "Shopan o Hiku Tame ni" (Japanese: ショパンを弾くために)	April 15, 2018
3	3	"What Mozart has left" Transliteration: "Mōtsaruto no Yuigon" (Japanese: モーツァルトの遺言)	April 22, 2018
4	4	"The Best Piano"; Transliteration: "Ichiban no Piano" (Japanese: 一番のピアノ)	April 29, 2018
5	5	"God of Competition"; Transliteration: "Konkūru no Kamisama" (Japanese: コンクールの神様)	May 6, 2018
6	6	"Forest of Piano"; Transliteration: "Mori no Piano" (Japanese: 森のピアノ)	May 13, 2018
7	7	"Reunion"; Transliteration: "Saikai" (Japanese: 再会)	May 20, 2018
8	8	"A Letter of Challenge"; Transliteration: "Chōsen-jō" (Japanese: 挑戦状)	May 27, 2018
9	9	"New Signs at Warsaw"; Transliteration: "Warushawa no Taidō" (Japanese: ワルシャワの胎動)	June 3, 2018
10	10	"The Chopin Competition"; Transliteration: "Shopan Konkūru" (Japanese: ショパン・コンクール)	June 10, 2018
11	11	"New Wind from Poland"; Transliteration: "Pōrando no Shinsei" (Japanese: ポーランドの新星)	June 24, 2018
12	12	"fff" Transliteration: "fff (Forutisshisshimo)" (Japanese: fff（フォルティッシッシモ）)	July 1, 2018

==== Season 2 ====
No. overall	No. in season	Title (Note: English titles are taken from Netflix.)	Original air date
13	1	"Chopin's Journey"; Transliteration: "Shopan no Tabiji" (Japanese: ショパンの旅路)	January 27, 2019
14	2	"Fixation"; Transliteration: "Kakeru Omoi" (Japanese: 懸ける想い)	February 3, 2019
15	3	"Awakening"; Transliteration: "Kakuseu" (Japanese: 覚醒)	February 10, 2019
16	4	"Promise"; Transliteration: "Yakusoku" (Japanese: 約束)	February 17, 2019
17	5	"Dance of Deliberation"; Transliteration: "Shingi wa Odoru" (Japanese: 審議は踊る)	February 24, 2019
18	6	"Requiem"; Transliteration: "Rekuiemu" (Japanese: レクイエム)	March 3, 2019
19	7	"For the Sake of Your Number One"; Transliteration: "Kimi no "1-ban" no Tame ni" (Japanese: 君の"1番"のために)	March 10, 2019
20	8	"The Truth About Pang Wei"; Transliteration: "Pan Uei no Shinjitsu" (Japanese: パン・ウェイの真実)	March 17, 2019
21	9	"As Proof That You Lived"; Transliteration: "Anata ga Ikita Akashi ni" (Japanese: あなたが生きた証に)	March 24, 2019
22	10	"In the Country Where Chopin Was Born"; Transliteration: "Shopan no Umareta kuni de" (Japanese: ショパンの生まれた国で)	March 31, 2019
23	11	"Hero"; Transliteration: "Hīrō" (Japanese: ヒーロー)	April 14, 2019
24	12	"The Best Pianist In The World"; Transliteration: "Sekaīchi no Pianisuto" (Japanese: 世界一のピアニスト)	April 14, 2019

== Reception ==
Forest of Piano received the Grand Prize for best manga at the 12th Japan Media Arts Festival in 2008.

The movie adaptation debuted in 9th place at the Japanese box office the week it came out, unusually high for a non-franchise animated film. By the end of the year, it had grossed the equivalent of $1,555,297, ranking 119 on the overall yearly box office chart for Japan. In South Korea, the film played for 50 weeks and grossed the equivalent of $182,884. The film was nominated for the 2008 Japan Academy Prize for Animation of the Year.
