= Hanada Shōnen Shi =

Media franchise based on Japanese manga by Makoto Isshiki

- First tankōbon volume cover, featuring Hanada Ichiro

花田少年史
- Genre: Comedy-drama; Slice of life; Supernatural
- Manga
- Written by: Makoto Isshiki
- Published by: Kodansha
- Imprint: Mister Magazine KC
- Magazine: Mr. Magazine
- Original run: 1993 – 1995
- Volumes: 4
- Anime television series
- Directed by: Masayuki Kojima
- Produced by: Hiroshi Yamashita; Manabu Tamura; Masao Maruyama
- Music by: Yoshihisa Hirano
- Studio: Madhouse
- Original network: Nippon TV
- Original run: October 2, 2002 – March 26, 2003
- Episodes: 25
- Live-action film
- Directed by: Nobuo Mizuta
- Written by: Sumio Ōmori
- Music by: Taro Iwashiro
- Studio: Shochiku
- Released: August 19, 2006
- icon

Hanada Shōnen Shi (花田少年史; lit. 'The Record of Boy Hanada') is a Japanese manga series written and illustrated by Makoto Isshiki. It was serialized in Kodansha's seinen manga magazine Mr. Magazine from 1993 to 1995, with its chapters collected in four tankōbon volumes. The story follows a mischievous young boy, called Hanada Ichiro, who attains the ability to see and talk to the supernatural after an accident to the back of his head.

A 25-episode anime television series by Madhouse was broadcast on Nippon TV from October 2002 to March 2003. A live-action film adaptation premiered in August 2006.

In 1995, Hanada Shōnen Shi won the 19th Kodansha Manga Award in the general category.

== Plot ==
Hanada Ichiro is the troublemaker in a small village. After being hit by a truck and getting stitches in the back of his head, he gains the ability to see ghosts, all of whom want him to fulfill their unfinished business.

== Media ==
=== Manga ===
Written and illustrated by Makoto Isshiki, Hanada Shōnen Shi was serialized in Kodansha's seinen manga magazine Mr. Magazine from 1993 to 1995. Kodansha collected its chapters in four tankōbon volumes released from January 1994 to July 1995; it was republished in a four-volume in 1999; a five-volume edition in 2002–03; a five-volume edition in 2006; and five-volume edition in 2015.

=== Anime ===
A 25-episode anime television series adaptation, directed by Masayuki Kojima and animated by Madhouse, was broadcast on Nippon TV, from October 2, 2002, to March 26, 2003. The opening theme is "The One" and the ending theme is "Drowning", both performed by the American vocal group the Backstreet Boys.

==== Music ====
The original soundtrack of the anime series was composed by Yoshihisa Hirano. The album was released on March 24, 2003.

=== Live-action film ===
A live-action film adaptation premiered on August 19, 2006. The film was directed by Nobuo Mizuta and stars Kenta Suga as Ichiro Hanada. It was distributed by Shochiku.

== Reception ==
The manga received the 19th Kodansha Manga Award for the general category in 1995.

The anime series received the Tokyo International Anime Festival Grand Prize for the TV Anime category in 2003.
