= The Tibetan Dog =

2011 film by Masayuki Kojima

- Theatrical poster
- Directed by: Masayuki Kojima
- Screenplay by: Naoto Inoue
- Based on: Mastiffs of the Plateau by Yang Zhijun
- Produced by: Yasuteru Iwase
- Cinematography: Yuuki Kawashita
- Edited by: Satoshi Terauchi
- Music by: Shusei Murai
- Production companies: Madhouse; Ciwen Media
- Distributed by: Madhouse (Japan)
- Release dates: July 15, 2011 (China); January 7, 2012 (Japan)
- Running time: 90 minutes
- Countries: China; Japan
- Budget: CNY60 million
- Box office: CNY1.35 million (in China)

The Tibetan Dog (Chinese: 藏獒多吉; Japanese: チベット犬物語 ～金色のドージェ～) is a 2011 Chinese/Japanese animated film directed by Masayuki Kojima, co-produced by Madhouse, China Film Group Corporation and Ciwen Pictures. It is based on the novel Mastiffs of the Plateau by Yang Zhijun. It premiered at the 51st Annecy Film Festival in June 2011. Manga artist Naoki Urasawa provided the initial character designs before they were reworked by Shigeru Fujita. In this film, a young boy named Tenzing leaves for Tibet after his mother dies to live with his father in the prairies and encounters a true friend in the form of a golden Tibetan Mastiff. Maiden Japan released the film on home video in the U.S.

== Critical reception ==
On the page of Animation Scoop website, famous critic Charles Solomon posted a comment for this film: "After it premiered at Annecy in 2011, Tibetan Dog opened in China, but no one went to it. The film earned a mere 1.35 million Yuan, about $209,000 at the time, against a reported budget of 60 million Yuan (about $9.3 million). Its subsequent release in Japan also failed to attract much attention". He also added that "Tibetan Dog may not be a great movie, but it is a perfectly acceptable family film—and more entertaining than many bigger budget American and European offerings".

On the website Anime News Network, the critic Justin Sevakis commented: "Rather than getting caught up in somber melodrama, the film is full of action and treats both its human and animal cast with a surprising amount of realism for what is basically a "boy and his dog" movie. There are occasional "wacky" moments (and the politics among the dogs is so human-like it's a little silly), the scripting is remarkably smart". Using his opinion, the film offers a distinctive portrayal of life in Tibet, which stands out not only within the realm of anime but also in the broader spectrum of cinema. Its challenge in appealing to Western audiences lies in its occasional intensity, notably in its depiction of violence against animals.

On YouTube, BobSamurai Anime Reviews gave 7.5 out of 10, commenting: "While it caught my attention with their familiar character designs, again, it was the background artists who are the true MVP as they created this highly articulate atmosphere that brought their village to life. I loved seeing inside their yurts and seeing the dogs run through the tall grass with mountains in the background. The movie also has a pretty solid ending too that I personally enjoyed, but if you've got kids, it will probably take them on a roller coaster of emotions. Plus, it's wholesome and valuable morals about treating animals with kindness and the importance of understanding people".
