= Bomberman Jetters =

Japanese anime television series

- Cover of the first VHS volume. From left to right: Birdy, Shout, White Bomber, Rui, Gangu, and Bongo

ボンバーマンジェッターズ (Bonbāman Jettāzu)
- Manga
- Written by: Tomofumi Matsubara
- Published by: Shogakukan
- Magazine: CoroCoro Comic
- Original run: May 2002 – March 2003
- Manga

Let's Go!! Bomberman Jetters
- Written by: Takeshi Tamai
- Published by: Shogakukan
- Magazine: CoroCoro Comic
- Original run: September 2002 – March 2003
- Anime television series
- Directed by: Katsuyuki Kodera
- Written by: Atsushi Maekawa
- Music by: Kazunori Maruyama
- Studio: Studio Deen
- Original network: TV Tokyo
- Original run: October 2, 2002 – September 24, 2003
- Episodes: 52
- Video game

Bomberman Jetters: The Legendary Bomberman
- Developer: Amble
- Publisher: Hudson Soft
- Genre: Action RPG
- Platform: Game Boy Advance
- Released: October 24, 2002
- Video game
- Developer: Hudson Soft
- Publisher: JP: Hudson Soft; NA: Majesco
- Genre: Action
- Platform: PlayStation 2, GameCube
- Released: JP: December 19, 2002; NA: March 10, 2004
- Video game

Bomberman Jetters Vol. 1
- Developer: Hudson Soft
- Publisher: Hudson Soft
- Genre: Platform
- Platform: Mobile Phone
- Released: April 10, 2003
- Video game

Bomberman Jetters Game Collection
- Developer: Hudson Soft
- Publisher: Hudson Soft
- Genre: Minigame Compilation
- Platform: Game Boy Advance
- Released: October 16, 2003

Bomberman Jetters (Note: Japanese: ボンバーマンジェッターズ, Hepburn: Bonbāman Jettāzu) is a 2002 Japanese anime television series produced by NAS and TV Tokyo and animated by Studio Deen. It is based on the Bomberman video game series created by Hudson Soft. The series has also spawned two manga adaptations and four video games, one of which was released internationally.

== Plot ==
The Jetters are a highly trained intergalactic police force for keeping unique items safe from the Hige-Hige bandits. Mighty, an expert Bomberman and the leader of the Jetters, disappears while on a mission. Dr. Ein accepts Mighty's younger brother, White Bomber, into the Jetters because they need a Bomberman for the team. White Bomber is clumsy and childish, but idolizes his older brother. White Bomber and the rest of the Jetters have many adventures, foiling Doctor Mechado and Mujoe's plans to steal one-of-a-kind objects, facing off against the Hige-Hige Bandits, and returning antiques to their rightful owners.

Early episodes of Bomberman Jetters started out with the "monster of the week" formula, where Dr. Mechado and Mujoe would send in one of their "Super Combined" Bombermen one at a time to attack the Jetters.

Eventually the format shifted from light-hearted comedy "monster of the week" to a more dramatic, darker action story dealing with the themes of death, betrayal, and revenge, but still retaining some of the lighter aspect. Plots include characters going through trials with character development such as Shout learning the truth about her mother, how Bagular first met Mujoe, and White Bomber dealing with learning the truth of what happened to his older brother Mighty.

== Characters ==
=== Jetters ===
White Bomber (シロボン, Shiro Bon)
Voiced by: Tomoko Kaneda (Japanese); Sheryl Stanley (English)
A native Bomberman from Planet Bomber, White Bomber is very clumsy and quite thick. He wrecks things by accident, in contrast to his older brother Mighty. His accidents tend to make a critical situation worse, much to Shout's frustration. He brags endlessly about any achievement, no matter how small. White Bomber may mess up sometimes but he always means well and always tries to help. He is 10 years old. White Bomber doesn't seem to get angry at Shout, no matter how many times she yells, curses, and hits him (although this is purely out of fear of inciting Shout's wrath even further, rather than out of affection). He joined the Jetters in episode 2, thanks to Momo's relationship with Dr. Ein.
Shout (シャウト, Shauto)
Voiced by: Risa Mizuno (Japanese); Kristen Erdman (English)
Shout is the leader of the Jetters, who filled in for Mighty after his disappearance. She is the only female member of the Jetters. Shout picks on White Bomber, but she actually cares for him like a brother. She says that when he gets older he will lead the Jetters, just like Mighty once did. Her mother died in a space flight accident when she was an infant. Her age is unknown but she appears to be about the same age as White Bomber. In her civilian mode, she runs a ramen restaurant.
Gangu (ガング)
Voiced by: Tetsuya Yannagihara (Japanese); Scott Casey (English)
A robot created by Dr. Ein. He is a unique robot that wields gizmos in his body to assist the Jetters. He hates it when Bongo modifies him, especially for cooking. He does not remember when he was created or who created him, and has a recurring dream about fighting and defeating a giant robot.
Bongo (ボンゴ)
Voiced by: Yoshiyuki Hirai (Japanese); Schady Dan (English)
A hairy, large-bodied inventor from Planet Dodonpa who helps Dr. Ein and enjoys modifying Gangu, mostly without Gangu's permission. Like most of his species, he enjoys curry and ends his sentences with "bongo." Though he doesn't look like it, he is actually a royal prince. His full name is Sarusamanbo Kongaragaccha Bosanovavitch Bongoro Dodonpa XXXIV.
Birdy (バーディ, Bādi)
Voiced by: Masami Iwasaki (Japanese); Tony Carroll (English)
An anthropomorphic bird and a personal friend of Mighty. Birdy is a competent fighter and rarely reveals his emotions, but he loses his temper easily, especially when Rui is around and White Bomber is not. As a side job, he works as a taxi driver. In episode 36 he seems to know Mama. He is mysterious and goes out by himself a lot, but none of the other Jetters knows what he does or where he goes. Birdy can fight well and can make wings come out of his back to fly, and he can throw sharp feathers.
Mighty (マイティ, Maiti)
Voiced by: Hiroki Takahashi (Japanese); Duke Clement (English)
White Bomber's older brother, known as the legendary Bomberman, who bears a striking resemblance to the original Bomberman. Mighty has a silver visor covering his right eye and wears a red cape. He has a cool and collected personality and a strong sense of justice. Mighty and White Bomber share a very close brother bond. Mighty has some of the personality traits of White Bomber. He rides a hover-bike called the Moto-Jetter. Mighty can create the Thunder Bomb. After his brief return to Planet Bomber in episode 1 to guard Cosmo Diamond, he went on another mission to planet Nonbiri. Mighty fought the Higehige forces on his own, but after the last base had been destroyed, Mighty disappeared. In Zero's flashback, it was shown that Mighty was damaged in a gun attack by Mujoe and Zero had penetrated his wound to obtain combat data. Mighty destroyed the final base with his own attack. Mighty tried to give White Bomber his seventh Bomb Star before destroying the base, but he only possessed six Bomb Stars. The seventh Bomb Star is Mighty's badge.
Dr. Ein (ドクターアイン, Dokutā Ain)
Voiced by: Kenichi Ogata (Japanese); Tony Carroll (English)
A scientist who founded the Jetters. He has an annoying tendency to blow his nose on any piece of paper nearby, including letters of resignation, leading, understandably, to much confusion. He has a crush on Grandma Bomber (White Bomber and Mighty's grandmother), and calls her "Momo-chan", which makes her angry. Often regarded as a joke character, he also has a serious side. Ein tells the Jetters when there are missions.

=== Hige-Hige ===
Professor Bagular (プロフェッサーバグラー, Purofessā Bagurā)
Voiced by: Mugihito
Bagular is the mastermind behind the Hige-Hige Gang, with the goal of collecting universally unique items. He resembles a large blue beardly old Bomberman with a letter B on his forehead and wears one gold monocle over his left eye and has a belt, gloves and a red cape. He is not actually evil, and was great friends with the Jetters' founder, Dr. Ein, but they were split by an intense rivalry for the affections of Momo. In later episodes, it is revealed that Bagular is a pawn in Dr Mechado's sinister scheme to take over the Hige Hige Bandits. Bagular was later rescued by Mujoe in his second Schnurburt base infiltration attempt.
Mujoe (ムジョー, Mujō)
Voiced by: Kōji Ishii (Japanese); Craig Elowitz (English)
A pawn of Bagular, Mujoe is usually in charge of commanding the Hige-Hige Gang's troops. He resembles a pro wrestler. He has blonde hair, a blonde mustache and beard, and a strange-looking spandex suit. He wears shades and a large green cape. Mujoe used the Super Combined Bomberman Making Machine and shot at Charaboms to make Mermaid Bomber, Thunder Bomber, Fire Bomber, and Grand Bomber. Bagular found the jobless Mojoe sleeping in the streets, and decided to employ Mojoe on his quest against Dr. Ein. After the Schnurburt base had been taken over by Dr. Mechado, Jetters attempted to free Bagular by infiltrating the Schnurburt base, but the plot failed. Mujoe then attempted to sacrifice himself to take down Max, but failed. Mujoe escaped from Max's attack by pulling an escape trigger just before the attack hits. Since then, he re-infiltrated Schnurburt base under Dr. Ein's secret plan in episode 49, and was successful.
Dr. Mechado (Dr．メカード, Dr. Mekādo) / Dr. Mechard
Voiced by: Naoki Tatsuta (Japanese); Tony Carrol (English)
Mechado is the Hige-Hige Bandits' mad scientist and Bagular's more trusted henchman. He does all the building and machinery for Bagular and the Hige-Hige Bandits. In Episode 40, Mechado turns against Bagular. Mechado and Bagular went to the same science academy back in their younger days, and Mechado blames Bagular for stealing his ideas about the bomb crystals. Bagular tries to explain that his idea was false, but Mechado refused to listen. As a result, Mechado goes into a rage, locking Bagular up in prison and taking over the Hige-Hige Bandits. Since the bomb crystals are inside Planet Bomber, his ultimate plan is to collide Planet Bomber and Planet Jetters together until both planets are destroyed. His main creation is the Super Combined Bomberman Making Machine to turn any inanimate objects or helpless Charaboms into his own Bombermen.
MAX (マックス, Makkusu) / MA-10
Voiced by: Hiroki Takahashi (Japanese); Duke Clement (English)
At first solely referred to as the infamous "Space Bounty Hunter," it is later discovered that he is a creation of Mechado. He has no feelings or compassion, and will do whatever it takes to reach his goal. He uses the lightning bomb and balloon bomb, similar to the missing Mighty. Max's body was destroyed in episode 51, but he manages to write his data into Zero before Zero begins the lethal hit, hence taking control of his body. Max's spirit was destroyed by Shirobon's ruse bomb, saving the fatally wounded Zero. There are five other units based on this unit. They are Zero (ゼロ) (MA-0), MA-3 (Voiced by: Ryō Naitō), MA-5 (Voiced by: Kei Watanabe), MA-7 (Voiced by: Holly Kaneko) and MA-9 (Voiced by: Takeshi Maeda)
Hige-Hige Bandits (ヒゲヒゲ団, Hige-Hige Dan)
Voiced by: Hiroyuki Harada
Hige-Hige Bandits are small, powerful robots. The basic members of the Hige-Hige gang equal of strength to the Bombermen. Created by Bagular, they are very powerful as individuals and even more powerful in numbers. The Hige-Hige seem to be always happy in every piece of work they are doing but still expect to be paid for it. To those outside the Hige-Hige Bandits, excluding Mujoe, it appears all they can say is "Hige", but it is apparently a language in and of itself. There are three types of Hige-Hige bandits. Their uniform consists of an orange scarf, white boots and gloves, and black full body armor. The programming of Hige-Hige units are stored inside disks that are loaded into the disk drives in their heads.
Mama (ママ)
Voiced by: Yoshiko Iseki
A Xenomorph-like bartender working in the Hige-Hige headquarters who debuted in episode 5. Mujoe shows great affection for Mama. She is also well liked by the Hige-Hige. In episode 40 she is held at the base, but still works as a bartender. Later she was rescued by Mujoe.

=== Combination bombers ===
Bat Bomber (バットボンバー, Batto Bonbā)
Voiced by: Ryō Naitō
A bomber created in episode 3 when the combined bomber machine was tested on a bat. Has bat wings and a pig nose. His special bomb is the bat bomb, which flies around before releasing a swarm of bats. He reappeared to compete in the B-1 Grand Prix, but was defeated by Pretty Bomber in 1st round.
Kamome Bomber (カモメボンバー, Kamome Bonbā)
Voiced by: Ryō Naitō
A seagull bomber that appeared in episode 9 in search of a unique item. Under the orders of Mujoe, it attacks by firing missiles, but was destroyed by Max's lightning bomb. It reappeared to compete in the B-1 Grand Prix and was able to win first round. It lost in the second round when the referee declared it was absent, even though it was on the battlefield.
Dolphin Bomber (ドルフィンボンバー, Dorufin Bonbā)
Voiced by: Miki Suga
A female bomber created in episode 4, capable of making ultrasound bombs and toss back bombs thrown by opponents. She has an uncontrollable urge to jump through hoops. She wears a swim ring with a skirt underneath, a seashell bra, and lipstick. She was destroyed by Shirobon's bomb when Dolphin Bomber tries to jump through a hoop created by modifying Gangu; she was turned back into a normal dolphin. She reappeared to compete in the B-1 Grand Prix, but lost in the first round when the pool where Dolphin Bomber is in dried up.
Bear Bomber (ベアボンバー, Bea Bonbā)
Voiced by: Ryō Naitō
A bomber created in episode 8 in the ice comet. He does not throw bombs, but attacks with his claws. After it was tossed in the air by Bongo with a bear trap made from Gangu, it was destroyed by Shirobon's bomb. He reappeared to compete in the B-1 Grand Prix, but was defeated by Bomber Kid.
Coma Bomber (コマボンバー, Koma Bonbā)
Voiced by: Ryō Naitō
A spinning top bomber created in episode 5 to help Mujoe to dig tunnels, but it is incapable of digging tunnels. It can create spinning top bombs, but it prefers to play tricks with the bombs than to use them as weapons. It was destroyed by Shirobon's bomb after Shout trapped it in elevator. It reappeared to compete in the B-1 Grand Prix, but when it fought against Hige-hige unit #156 in the first round, it lost.
Dark Force Bomber (ダークフォースボンバー, Dāku Fōsu Bonbā)
Voiced by: Eiji Takemoto (Japanese); Mike Plavlichko (English)
It was created by combining Mechado with the four Proto-Max units in episode 50. Although his name is "Dark Force Bomber", he looks angelic in appearance. His attack is the Dark Force Bomb. Dark Force Bomber was defeated by Shirobon's newest attack in episode 51, and was returned into the four Proto-Max units and Mechado. In the videogame, he was created by the combined powers of the Bomber Shitennou, and he had more attacks.

=== Bomber Shitennou ===
Flame Bomber (フレイムボンバー, Fureimu Bonbā)
Voiced by: Kei Watanabe (Japanese); Scott Casey (English)
A flame-wielding Bomber who was the first Bomber Shitennou seen in action; Flame Bomber defeated White Bomber. He is very childish and doesn't take his work very seriously. He was overpowered and defeated by White Bomber's new flame-based bomb star. After he was defeated in episode 16, he returned into three Pteragodon. As well as possessing Pyrokinesis, he can produce and wield his signature "Flame Fire" Bombs. His Battlefield is an ancient Chinese temple courtyard.
Mermaid Bomber (マーメイドボンバー, Māmeido Bonbā)
Voiced by: Kaori Asou (Japanese); Vanessa Bellardini (English)
A female water-wielding Bomber who took over the job of the beaten Flame Bomber in episode 17. During her encounter with the Jetters, she fell in love with Birdy, but her plans were foiled by Shirobon. She is proud and arrogant, and tends to act more like a spoiled little girl, using her looks on Mujoe to get what she wants. She likes to do things her way, or not at all. When Mermaid Bomber was defeated after being electrocuted by Shirobon's Sunrise Thunder Bomb in episode 18, she turned into three Triple Shells. She can produce and use her signature "Splash Water" Bombs. Her Battlefield is a large floating oasis.
Grand Bomber (グランボンバー, Guran Bonbā)
Voiced by: Holly Kaneko (Japanese); Steve Hook (English)
A strong and kind Bomber Shitennou. He is a very honourable person, and sometimes not sure whether he is fighting for good or evil. He befriends Shirobon, not knowing he is a Jetter. When faced with destroying Shirobon, he cannot bring himself to do it, and convinces White Bomber to destroy him instead. As well as being able to roll at high speeds and fire off the spikes on his body to attack foes, he can produce and wield the Clay Bombs and Brick Bombs. His Battlefield is a farm, but in the video game it was an underground arena with a design similar to the traditional Bomberman maze.
Thunder Bomber (サンダーボンバー, Sandā Bonbā)
Voiced by: Eiji Takemoto (Japanese); Bob Sander (English)
The last and most powerful of the Bomber Shitennou. Aside from being able to use his signature "Thunder Bombs" and "Flash Thunderbolt Bombs", he has mastery over a wide variety of electrical attacks. Incredibly loyal to Mujoe, he respects his elders and superiors; he wants to expose those who are framing Mujoe at all costs. Because of this, he has an intense rivalry with Max, as he believes that he is plotting to overthrow Mujoe. He is defeated by Max's signature attack, Hyper Plasma Bomb. His battlefield is never seen in the anime (Mechado interrupted him when he was about to summon it), but in the video game, his battlefield is a floating arena surrounded by an electric fence.

=== Other Bombermen ===
Oyabon (オヤボン)
Voiced by: Tetsu Inada
First runner-up in the B-1 Grand Prix at least twice, losing to Mighty and then Zero. Momo's former student. Uses the "Bancho bomb", "banchou" referring to the leader of a student gangster group. He obtains his sixth Bomb Star after completing a Bomb Star search quest with White Bomber, Kobon, and Daibon.
Kobon (コボン)
Voiced by: Yumiko Kobayashi
White Bomber's friend and Oyabon's follower. He cannot use bombs because he is not really a Bomberman. Constantly praises Oyabon after he speaks, stating that he "will take this lesson to heart". The name "Kobon" is a pun on the word "kobun", meaning "underling". He eventually obtains a Bomb Star after completing a Bomb Star search quest with White Bomber, Oyabon, and Daibon.
Daibon (ダイボン)
Voiced by: Takashi Matsuyama
A cowardly Bomberman who always regards himself as worthless. Followed by a being much like Louie named Pui (プーイ, Pūi; Voiced by: Junko Takeuchi). Eventually, he obtains his second Bomb Star after completing a Bomb Star search quest with White Bomber, Kobon, and Oyabon.
Momo (モモ, Momo) / Granny Bomber (ボン婆さん, Bon Bā-san)
Voiced by: Kaori Asou (Japanese), Haruhi Terada (Japanese, young) (Japanese); Amy Walls (English)
A very swift and powerful female Bomber who lived with her grandsons, White Bomber and Mighty. She taught them most of what they knew as bombers, and constantly tries to help White Bomber improve his skills.
Bomber Silver (ボンバーシルバー, Bonbā Shirubā)
Voiced by: Hidenobu Kiuchi
A senior B-1 Grand Prix competitor against White Bomber in the second round, who was defeated by him using Silver Bomber's own technique.

=== Bombermen from older video games ===
Pretty Bomber (プリティボンバー, Puriti Bonbā)
Voiced by: Haruhi Nanao
A pink female bomber who has a large fan base. Uses the "Pretty Bomb." Pretty Bomber won the first round in the B-1 Grand Prix, but was absent in the second round.
Bomber Kid (ボンバーキッド, Bonbā Kiddo)
Voiced by: Yosho Ishikura
A cowboy bomber who can fire bombs at the speed of a bullet. He later helps White Bomber against Dark Force Bomber.
Bomber Ninja (ボンバーニンジャ, Bonbā Ninja)
Voiced by: Takeshi Maeda
A ninja bomber who specializes in confusing the enemy with clouds of smoke. Uses the "Shuriken bomb". During the B-1 Grand Prix, against Shirobon in first round, it was defeated by Shirobon's fire bomb. He later helps Shirobon against Dark Force Bomber.

=== Charabom ===
Pox (ポックス, Pokkusu)
Voiced by: Shimozaki Hiroshi (Japanese); Schady Dan (English)
Shell (シェル, Sheru) / Kaiman
Voiced by: Mariko Nagahama (Japanese); Amy Walls (English)
Sharkun (シャークン, Shākun)
Voiced by: Takayuki Kondō (Japanese); Ed Zyjewski (English)
Pomyu (ポミュ, Pomyu) / Pommy
Voiced by: Yuki Nakao (Japanese); Kristin Erdman (English)
Pomyu Dragon (ポミュドラゴン, Pomyu Doragon) / Pomyu Dragon
Voiced by: Mariko Nagahama (Japanese); Amy Walls (English)
A red, fire breathing Charabom living in the ice comet; appeared in episode 8.
Hiroshi (ヒロシ, Hiroshi)
Voiced by: Haruhi Terada
A pink Elephan Charabom debuted in episode 11. The charabom first appeared from an escape pod that crash-landed into the Jetters base on Planet Jetters. The Hiroshi name was given by Bomberman. After it had been returned to its mother in episode 12, the Jetters learnt Hiroshi was a female charabom named Catherine.

=== Other characters ===
Rui (ルーイ, Rūi)
Voiced by: Haruhi Terada
Rui is a green kangaroo-like animal who helps Bomberman by letting him ride on his back. His species is one generally chosen by Bombermen as a sidekick. Rui often washes dishes at the Jetters ramen shop. Rui is a good ramen cook, and is very devoted to whatever he does. All he can say is his name. Gangu and White Bomber are the only ones who can fully understand him; Birdy buys a book on Louie language in an attempt to understand him.
Misty (ミスティ, Misuti)
Voiced by: Rica Matsumoto
Misty is an anthropomorphic cat with a short temper like Shout. Before her encounter with White Bomber, she met Mighty and Birdy in a ruby heist. After being saved by White Bomber, she gave him a red bombstar. She is a space thief, but she fell in love with Mighty, and later took in Zero after finding him while at the site of Mighty's death. She realized Zero's true identity soon after meeting him, and constantly gets him to reveal knowledge only Mighty should have known. Originally Mighty wanted to invite Misty to join Jetters, but the Jetters badge was broken.
Twist (ツイスト, Tsuisuto)
Shout's father, a widower and the owner of the noodle store. He is usually seen reading a newspaper, which covers his face. He lost his wife, Natsumi (ナツミ), in the explosion of 1988A supernova in a space flight accident.
Nightly (ナイトリー, Naitorī)
Voiced by: Hozumi Gōda
A large duck-like character who is an expert at gathering information. Usually seen wearing a trenchcoat and sunglasses. His main client is Birdy.

== Media ==
A gag manga series, Explosion!! Bomberman Jetters, (Note: 爆裂!! ボンバーマンジェッターズ, Bakuretsu!! Bomberman Jetters) was authored by Tomofumi Matsuhara and began serialization in CoroCoro Comic in September 2002. The manga was later succeeded in April 2003 by a new series, titled Let's Go!! Bomberman Jetters, (Note: それいけ！！ボンバーマンジェッターズ, Sore Ike!! Bonbāman Jettāzu) which was authored by Takeshi Tamai and ran until November 2003.

A 52-episode anime series was produced by Nihon Ad Systems (NAS) and TV Tokyo, animated by Studio Deen, and broadcast on TV Tokyo from October 2, 2002, to September 24, 2003.

Hudson Soft published four different video games in Japan based on the anime. The first, Bomberman Jetters: The Legendary Bomberman, (Note: ボンバーマンジェッターズ〜伝説のボンバーマン〜, Bonbāman Jettāzu: Densetsu no Bonbāman) was released for the Game Boy Advance on October 24, 2002. This was followed by Bomberman Jetters, released for the PlayStation 2 and GameCube on December 19, 2002. A mobile game, titled Bomberman Jetters Vol. 1, was released on April 10, 2003. Finally, a second Game Boy Advance game, Bomberman Jetters Game Collection, (Note: ボンバーマンジェッターズゲームコレクション, Bonbāman Jettāzu Gēmu Korekushon) released on October 16, 2003. The GameCube version of Bomberman Jetters was the only game to be released in English, with Majesco publishing it in North America on March 10, 2004.

== Theme songs ==
- Openings
1. "I'm at the Edge of a Cliff" (僕は崖っぷち, Boku wa Gakeppuchi)
  - October 2, 2002 – July 9, 2003
  - Lyricist: Hideo Suwa / Composer: Tatsuya Furukawa / Arranger: Tatsuya Furukawa / Singers: Hideo Suwa
  - Episode Range: 1–41
2. "Hop! Skip! Jump!" (ホップ！スキップ！ジャンプ！, Hoppu! Sukippu! Janpu!)
  - July 16, 2003 – September 24, 2003
  - Lyricist: Hideo Suwa / Composer: Tatsuya Furukawa / Arranger: Masahiro Iuchi / Singers: Hideo Suwa
  - Episode Range: 42–52
- Endings
1. "Little Memories of When I Was Small" (小さな頃の小さな記憶, Chīsana Koro no Chīsana Kioku)
  - October 2, 2002 – June 4, 2003
  - Lyricist: Asuka Matsumoto / Composer: Maruyama Kazunori / Arranger: Tatsuya Furukawa / Singers: Asuka Matsumoto
  - Episode Range: 1–36
2. "love letter"
  - June 11, 2003 – September 17, 2003
  - Lyricist: Manami Fujino / Composer: Tsugumi Kataoka / Arranger: Tsugumi Kataoka / Singers: PARQUETS
  - Episode Range: 37–51
3. "I'm at the Edge of a Cliff" (僕は崖っぷち, Boku wa gakeppuchi)
  - September 24, 2003
  - Lyricist: Hideo Suwa / Composer: Tatsuya Furukawa / Arranger: Tatsuya Furukawa / Singers: Hideo Suwa
  - Episode Range: 52

== Episodes ==
No.	Title	Original release date
1	"The Idol Bomberman"; Transliteration: "Akogare no Bonbāman" (Japanese: 憧れのボンバーマン)	October 2, 2002
Mighty returns to Planet Bomber to guard the Cosmo Diamond, reuniting with Shirobon upon arrival. Mujoe leads his army to steal the diamond with the help of his heat cannon, and Shirobon attempts to help his brother despite the danger.
2	"The Five Jetters"; Transliteration: "Gonin Me no Jettāzu" (Japanese: 5人目のジェッターズ)	October 9, 2002
Shirobon joins the Jetters for their first assignment of protecting a unique dinosaur egg from the High-Hige.
3	"Tremendous Foe! Bombermen Unite!"; Transliteration: "Kyōteki! Gattai Bonbāman!" (Japanese: 強敵!合體ボンバーマン!)	October 16, 2002
The Jetters receive a mission to protect a golden cat statue from the High-Hige. Trouble ensues when Dr. Mechado unveils their gang's big weapon, The Combined Bomberman Making Machine, which can turn any creature fired at into a living Bomberman. When he uses it to create their first foe, Bat Bomber, and manages to steal the statue, Shirobon does battle with him to get it back.
4	"White Bomber Proceeds Without Permission!"; Transliteration: "Shirobon Mudan Hasshin!" (Japanese: シロボン無斷發進!)	October 23, 2002
Tired of being Bongo's test subject, Gangu decides to leave the Jetters, only to be accidentally thrown into a garbage truck and taken to Totemoku Planet. While Shirobon and Bongo take off on their own to rescue him, Mechado loses his universally-unique perfume, which is sent to the same planet and orders the High-Hige bandits to retrieve it.
5	"Underground GO! GO! GO!"; Transliteration: "Chitei Gō! Gō! Gō!" (Japanese: 地底GO！GO！GO！)	October 30, 2002
Shirobon blows up Shout's ramen shop trying to help with cooking and accidentally burns out their special space coal. When Shout learns they can mine for more coal on Planet Kurodaiya, she takes the Jetters out to do some mining. A worker of the mines happens to have the only unique pick axe of the universe, and becomes the target of the High-Hige. When the two teams collide, Shirobon must go up against their second created foe, Top Bomber, and protect the pick axe.
6	"Man of Mystery, Max"; Transliteration: "Naze no Otoko, Makkusu" (Japanese: 謎の男、MAX)	November 6, 2002
In an attempt to redeem their pride, Mujoe forces a sheriff to call the Jetters to Planet Western to challenge Shirobon to a duel, only for a mysterious man named Max to appear, who displays a rather familiar gesture that leaves Shirobon and Birdy in shock.
7	"Chase down the Higehige Gang!"; Transliteration: "Hige Hige Dan wo Oikakero!" (Japanese: ヒゲヒゲ團を追いかけろ!)	November 13, 2002
Jetters and Hige-Hige bandits go to Planet Kouraku for a break. Shirobon discovers an underground race of mouse-like people. Meanwhile, Hige-Hige soldiers were having a break in the caves. When Chūko sneaks into a basket owned by Hige-Hige soldiers, the natives and the Jetters pursue the kidnappers.
8	"The Blue Rose of Memory"; Transliteration: "Omoide no Aoi Bara" (Japanese: 思い出の青いバラ)	November 20, 2002
The Jetters set out to protect an ice rose found only in an ice comet from the Hige-Hige.
9	"Aim for the Treasure Island!"; Transliteration: "Takarajima wo Mezase!" (Japanese: 寶島を目指せ!)	November 27, 2002
The Jetters and Hige-Hige search for a unique sailor-suited fish head figurehead in Planet Resort.
10	"The Dusk of Bomber Star"; Transliteration: "Yūyake no Bomustā" (Japanese: 夕燒(ゆうや)けのボムスター)	December 4, 2002
When Shirobon's ship crash lands, Shirobon meets Misty, a thief who is also looking for unique items.
11	"Mother at 3000 Light-years"; Transliteration: "Mama wo Tazune Sanzen Kōnen" (Japanese: ママをたずねて三千光年)	December 11, 2002
When an escape pod containing a Charabom crash lands on Planet Jetters, Jetters takes a trip to a planet full of Charaboms to search for the Charabom's parent. When the Jetters arrive at the planet, Shout decides to have Jetters join Ajoe's army to look for a unique item. The Jetters were arrested by Pteragodon police, but Ajoe's army rescued the Jetters from prison.
12	"Protect Charabom!"; Transliteration: "Kyarabon wo Mamore!" (Japanese: キャラボンを守れ!)	December 18, 2002
Ajoe met Mujoe when the heroes were running from the local authorities. Pteragodon police pursued them, but the soldiers brought out barbecue meat from the pots on their heads to distract the pursuers. When the police Charaboms finally caught up, they targeted Mujoe instead. Mujoe was disguised as Hiroshi's mother and lured Hiroshi away, but was unable to move far away from Jetters. When Jetters finally reunite Hiroshi and Mama Elephan, Jetters realized Shirobon had been carrying the unique item, a kettle capable of preserving heat for a million years, all along. Shirobon returned the item to Mama Elephan. After leaving planet Charabom, Shout told Shirobon that Hiroshi was a girl.
13	"The Defeat of White Bomber"; Transliteration: "Shirobon no Haiboku" (Japanese: シロボンの敗北)	December 25, 2002
President Bagura fires Mujoe from Hige-Hige for failing him one too many times. To gain back his trust, he uses the Combined Bomberman Making Machine to create the Bomber Shitennou, and calls the Jetters to challenge Shriobon, whose string of successes (including having earned a second Bomb Star in Episode 10) have made him egotistic.
14	"The Glory of the Higehige Gang"; Transliteration: "Eikō no Hige Hige Dan" (Japanese: 榮光のヒゲヒゲ團)	December 30, 2002
Mujoe shows a documentary film about the daily lives of Hige-Hige camp, through the perspective of Hige-Hige unit No. 156.
15	"Goodbye Jetters"; Transliteration: "Sara ba Jetāzu" (Japanese: さらばジェターズ)	January 8, 2003
Devastated by his defeat to Flame Bomber, Shirobon becomes too depressed to work, leading to Dr. Ein firing him from the Jetters. Without a Bomberman, the team fail to stand against the Hige-Hige and their newly added Bomber Shitennou. Back at Planet Bomber, Shirobon tries to think, and Momo introduces him to a training tower so that he may rediscover what it means to a be a Bomberman.
16	"White Bomber Returns"; Transliteration: "Kaette Kita Shirobon" (Japanese: 歸ってきたシロボン)	January 15, 2003
Shirobon enters the training tower, and passes through the stages with ease, until he faces Momo at the finals. After realizing nothing has changed even after earning his second Bomb Star, Shirobon finally realizes he still has a long path ahead of him. He returns to the Jetters to aid them and challenge Flame Bomber to a rematch.
17	"Mermaid Bomber of Allure!"; Transliteration: "Miwaku no Māmeido Bonbā!" (Japanese: 魅惑のマーメイドボンバー!)	January 22, 2003
Bongo and Gangu retire from the Jetters, thinking they are useless and that Shirobon carries the team. Meanwhile, during a mission to take back a universally unique pair of binoculars from the Hige-Hige, Shirobon battles Mermaid Bomber of the Shitennou.
18	"Sunrise Bomb of Friendship"; Transliteration: "Yūjō no Sanraizu Bomu" (Japanese: 友情のサンライズボム)	January 29, 2003
After losing to Mermaid Bomber, Shirobon must make a new bomb that can oppose water. Finally realizing he needs their help, Bongo and Gangu decide to help him develop the technique and assist the Jetters in accomplishing the mission.
19	"Max and White Bomber"; Transliteration: "Makkusu to Shirobon" (Japanese: MAXとシロボン)	February 5, 2003
The Jetters set off on a mission to protect unique spicy honey from being stolen. Max, however, has been chosen by President Bagura to steal for the Hige-Hige. When he uses another familiar technique, Shirobon angrily suspects that Max may be his brother Mighty.
20	"Plow! Grand Bomber!"; Transliteration: "Tagaya Seguran Bonbā!" (Japanese: 耕せグランボンバー!)	February 12, 2003
With the Shitennou down to only two members left and Mujoe too sick to carry out theft, Grand Bomber sets off on his own to defeat the Jetters during a rice planting tour, but ends up wanting to plant rice with Shirobon instead.
21	"Duel At the Ancient Hot Spring Village!"; Transliteration: "Kodai Onsen Kyō no Kettō!" (Japanese: 古代溫泉鄉の決鬥!)	February 19, 2003
Grand Bomber, having bonded with Shirobon, wants to join the Jetters. While the team discovers ancient hot springs, Mujoe and Thunder Bomber drop in to convince Grand otherwise, and becomes torn between sides when Shirobon refuses to fight him.
22	"Mighty's Longest Day"; Transliteration: "Maiti no Ichiban Nagai Hi" (Japanese: マイティの一番長い日)	February 26, 2003
During a mission, Max and Shirobon clash again, with Shirobon still suspicious Max could be his brother. After Birdy manages to drive him away, he has a long talk with Shirobon about what really happened during and after the Cosmo Diamond incident in an attempt to convince him Max is not Mighty.
23	"Shout's Tears"; Transliteration: "Shauto no Namida" (Japanese: シャウトの淚)	March 5, 2003
Birdy, Mujoe, and a mysterious figure meet up in secrecy and learn that Mighty is officially dead. Shout sneaks behind and learns as well, with Birdy figuring her stalking and tells her not to tell Shirobon. When she becomes depressed, the Jetters do what they can to lift her spirits. But when Shirobon keeps talking about his brother, Shout snaps and reveals the hard truth.
24	"Lightning Thunder Bomber!"; Transliteration: "Dendeki Sandā Bombā!" (Japanese: 電擊サンダーボンバー!)	March 12, 2003
After Shout reveals the truth to the team, a furious Shirobon runs off. Still unconvinced and believing Max to be Mighty, he goes undercover as a Hige-Hige bandit in Max's command unit and confronts him. Thunder Bomber also gets involved, and the confrontation turns deadly until Birdy saves Shirobon.
25	"The Truth Revealed"; Transliteration: "Akasareta Shinjitsu" (Japanese: 明かされた真実)	March 19, 2003
Birdy talks with Shirobon about Mighty's final mission, and Shirobon must accept the truth that he has died. Meanwhile, Max suggests destroying the Jetters HQ, which is against President Bagura's wishes. He proceeds anyway, taking a whole army of Hige-Hige bandits.
26	"We, the Jetters!"; Transliteration: "Boku ra Jettāzu!" (Japanese: ボクらジェッターズ！)	March 26, 2003
With Max having broken rank and out to destroy the Jetters and their planet, Shirobon and the team must overcome Mighty's death and band together to defeat Max once and for all.
27	"The Convenient Functions of Gangu!"; Transliteration: "Kinō Benri Gangu!" (Japanese: 機能便利ガング！)	April 2, 2003
28	"Louie's Departure"; Transliteration: "Rūi to Ohanashi" (Japanese: ルーイとおはなし)	April 9, 2003
29	"Melody of the Large Planet"; Transliteration: "Ōki na Hoshi no Merodi" (Japanese: 大きな星のメロディ)	April 16, 2003
30	"Curry and Prince"; Transliteration: "Karē to Oūji-sama" (Japanese: カレーと王子様)	April 23, 2003
31	"Misty's Big Campaign"; Transliteration: "Misuti Dai Sakusen" (Japanese: ミスティ大作戦)	April 30, 2003
32	"The Admirable White Bomber"; Transliteration: "Akogare Shirobon" (Japanese: 憧れのシロボン)	May 7, 2003
33	"Aim the Bomb!"; Transliteration: "Ain de Bon!" (Japanese: アインでボン！)	May 14, 2003
34	"Intense Fighting! B-1 Grand Prix!!"; Transliteration: "Gekitō! Bī-Wan Guran Puri!!" (Japanese: 激闘！ B-1グランプリ！！)	May 21, 2003
35	"B-1 Competition! The Burning Shirobon!"; Transliteration: "Bī-Wan Shōbu! Moeyo Shirobon!" (Japanese: B-1勝負！ 燃えよシロボン！)	May 28, 2003
36	"Close Encounter! Jetters 24 Hours"; Transliteration: "Mitchaku! Jettāzu Nijūyon-ji" (Japanese: 密着！ ジェッターズ24時)	June 4, 2003
37	"Reviving Max"; Transliteration: "Yomigaeru Makkusu" (Japanese: 蘇るマックス)	June 11, 2003
38	"Protecting the Great Invention"; Transliteration: "Dai Hatsumei wo Mamori Kire!" (Japanese: 大発明を守りきれ！)	June 18, 2003
39	"Suspicious Health Check"; Transliteration: "Giwaku no Kenkōshinda" (Japanese: 疑惑の健康診断)	June 25, 2003
40	"Coup d'etat Outbreak!"; Transliteration: "Kūdetā Boppatsu!" (Japanese: クーデター勃発！)	July 2, 2003
41	"New Life! Hige Hige Group of Darkness!"; Transliteration: "Shinsei! Yami no Higehige-dan" (Japanese: 新生！闇のヒゲヒゲ団)	July 9, 2003
42	"Mujoe, Man's Salty Ramen"; Transliteration: "Mujō, Otoko no Shio Rāmen" (Japanese: ムジョー、男の塩ラーメン)	July 16, 2003
43	"Assault! Schnurrbart!"; Transliteration: "Totsunyū! Shunurubaruto" (Japanese: 突入！ シュヌルバルト)	July 23, 2003
44	"Search for the Bomb Star!"; Transliteration: "Bomusutā o sagase!" (Japanese: ボムスターを探せ！)	July 30, 2003
45	"Zero and Shirobon"; Transliteration: "Zero to Shirobon" (Japanese: ゼロとシロボン)	August 6, 2003
46	"The Secret of the Bomb Crystal"; Transliteration: "Bomu Kurisutaru no Himitsu" (Japanese: ボムクリスタルの秘密)	August 13, 1003
47	"The Fearful Doctor Mechado"; Transliteration: "Sore wa Sore wa Okoroshī Mekādo" (Japanese: それはそれは恐ろしいメカード)	August 20, 2003
48	"Clash!? Jetter Star!"; Transliteration: "Gekitotsu!? Jettā Sei!" (Japanese: 激突！？ ジェッター星！)	August 27, 2003
49	"Schnurrbart Recaptured!"; Transliteration: "Shunurubaruto Dakkan!" (Japanese: シュヌルバルト奪還！)	September 3, 2003
50	"Unite! DarkForce Bombers!"; Transliteration: "Gattai! DākuFōsu Bonbā!" (Japanese: 合体！ ダークフォースボンバー！)	September 10, 2003
Mechado uses the Combined Bomberman Machine on himself and the Proto-Maxes to create Dark Force Bomber, an angel-like bomber that uses a lazer-like bomb that shoots in all directions.
51	"The Last Day of Bomber Star!"; Transliteration: "Bonbā-boshi Saigo no hi!" (Japanese: ボンバー星最後の日！)	September 17, 2003
52	"Advance! Jetters"; Transliteration: "Susume! Jettāzu" (Japanese: 進め！ ジェッターズ)	September 24, 2003
