= Blitch, Georgia =

Unincorporated community in Georgia, U.S.

Coordinates: 32°35′23″N 81°46′56″W

Blitch is an unincorporated community in Bulloch County, in the U.S. state of Georgia.

== History ==
A post office called Blitch was established in 1880, and remained in operation until 1919. W. H. Blitch, an early postmaster and local merchant, most likely gave the community his last name. In 1900, the community had 51 inhabitants.
