= Newton Amos Blitch =

American politician from Florida (1844-1921)

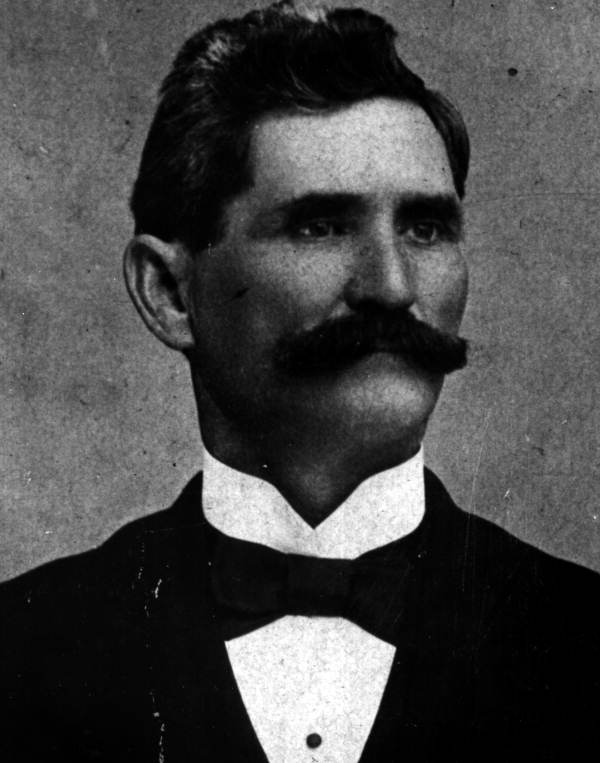
Blitch in 1897

Newton Amos Blitch (c. 1844 – 1921) was a state legislator and public official in Florida. He served in the Florida House of Representatives and Florida Senate. He represented Levy County, Florida. His post office was in Williston, Florida. He was a Confederate.

In 1891, he gathered with other legislators supporting Wilkinson Call and was photographed at the Florida capitol.

He married and had five children. His funeral was a major event in Tallahassee His remains were transported to Starke for burial.
