= Blatch =

Blatch is a surname occasionally used as a given name. Notable people called Blatch include:

- Emily Blatch, Baroness Blatch (1937–2005), British politician
- Harriot Stanton Blatch (1856–1940), American writer and suffragist
- Helen Blatch (1933–2015), British actress, mostly seen on television
- James Blatch Piggott Dennis (1815–1861), English paleontologist and natural historian
- Margaret Blatch (1886–1963), English chef, restaurateur, and cookbook writer
- Nora Stanton Blatch Barney (1883–1971), American civil engineer, architect, and suffragist
- Peter Blatch (born 1953)
- William Gabriel Blatch (1840–1900), British entomologist
