= Masayuki Kojima =

Japanese anime director (born 1961)

Masayuki Kojima (小島 正幸, Kojima Masayuki; born March 11, 1961) is a Japanese animator, storyboard artist, and director, best known for directing the acclaimed anime series Monster and Made in Abyss.

== Life and career ==
Kojima, a native of Yamanashi, Yamanashi, was born on March 11, 1961. He decided to enter the anime industry due to his love for visual media; although he could have worked in live-action media, he also drew manga and felt that animation offered the most direct way to combine his own drawings with visual storytelling. He enrolled at Tokyo Designer Academy with the goal of becoming an animation director. After graduating, he joined an animation production company.

In 1982, he made his directorial debut with the tenth episode of Gyakuten! Ippatsuman, produced at Tatsunoko Production. He went on to direct episodes for various Tatsunoko Production titles as well as series such as Moomin. During this time, his involvement was in television products mostly as an episode director. After joining Madhouse in the 1990s, he took part in dozens of productions as an animator, as well as helming several TV series, two films, a theatrical short, and a TV special. He has since left the studio and joined Kinema Citrus in 2011.

Since coming to work for Madhouse, Kojima has been primarily a drama director, and one who specializes in lengthy series. He has directed two adaptations of Naoki Urasawa's manga, Master Keaton and Monster, both of which have received critical acclaim. He directed a full-length theatrical film, Piano no Mori, which was released in Japan on July 21, 2007 and received a nomination for the 2008 Japan Academy Film Prize for Animation of the Year. In 2011, he joined several other Madhouse crew members for the film Tibetan Dog, which he directed. In 2017, he directed the first season of the anime Made in Abyss, while also storyboarding nine of the season's episodes. He later led it through its second season, which was released in 2022. He also directed the 2020 film Made in Abyss: Dawn of the Deep Soul.

Kojima attended Anime Central 2019 in Rosemont, Illinois.

== Artistry ==
Kevin Cirugeda of SakugaBlog called him a "chameleonic creator", remarking that "adaptability is his forte". Dominic Laeno of THEM Anime Reviews praised Kojima's directorial expertise on Monster, citing his ability to convey storytelling, animation, and character personality and designs. Carl Kimlinger of Anime News Network similarly praised both Kojima's faithfulness to the original Monster manga and use of live-action dubbers as voice actors. Bamboo Dong, also of Anime News Network, stated that Kojima's involvement in Black Bullet was a rare upside of an otherwise weak anime. A study by University of Arkansas-Fayetteville doctoral student Tsutomu Doiguchi assigned Kojima with a director HC (managerial human capital) of 181, the highest in a sample of anime films from 2000 to 2022, for Made in Abyss: Dawn of the Deep Soul.

Kojima cites Hayao Miyazaki and Isao Takahata as influences.

== Filmography ==
=== Director ===
- Azuki-chan (1995–1998) — Series Director, Storyboard, Animation Director
- DNA Sights 999.9 (1998) — Director, Storyboard
- Master Keaton (1998–1999) — Series Director, Storyboard (eps. 1–2, 4, 13), Episode Director (eps. 2, 13)
- Leave it to Kero! Theatrical Version (2000) — Director
- Magical Shopping Arcade Abenobashi (2002) — Series Director, Storyboard (eps. 2, 10, 12), Episode Director (ep. 2)
- Hanada Shōnen Shi (2002) — Director
- Monster (2004–2005) — Director, Storyboard (eps. 1–2, 6, 8, 38, 67, 73-74), Episode Director (eps. 1, 73), Key Animation
- A Spirit of the Sun (2006) — Director, Storyboard
- Piano no Mori (2007) — Director, Storyboard
- The Tibetan Dog (2011) — Director, Storyboard
- Busou Shinki: Moon Angel (2011–2012) — Director, Storyboard, Episode Director
- Oshiri Kajiri Mushi (2012–2013) — Director
- Black Bullet (2014) — Director, Key Animation (ep. 13)
- Made in Abyss (2017–2022) — Director, Storyboard (eps. 1–3, 5, 8-10, 12-13), Episode Director (ep. 12)
- Made in Abyss: Dawn of the Deep Soul (2020) — Director, Storyboard
- My Happy Marriage season 2 (2025) — Director
- Made in Abyss: Awakening Mystery (2026) — Director

=== Other ===
- Cybot Robotchi (1982–1983) — Episode Director
- Okawari-Boy Starzan S (1984) — Storyboard, Episode Director
- Aru Kararu no Isan OVA (1993) — Storyboard
- Cardcaptor Sakura (1998) — Storyboard (ep. 2)
- Reign: The Conqueror (1999) — Storyboard
- Sakura Wars (2000) — Animation Director
- Shingu: Secret of the Stellar Wars (2001) — Storyboard
- Space Pirate Captain Herlock The Endless Odyssey OVA (2002) — Storyboard (eps. 7-8)
- Trava: Fist Planet OVA (2003) — In-Between Animation
- Texhnolyze (2003) — Storyboard (ep. 7)
- Gungrave (2003–2004) — Key Animation (eps. 1–2, 8, 18)
- Gunslinger Girl (2003–2004) — Storyboard (ep. 3)
- Gokusen (2004) — Storyboard
- Samurai Champloo (2004–2005) — Key Animation (eps. 5, 22)
- Trinity Blood (2005) — Storyboard
- Black Lagoon (2006) — Key Animation
- Granblue Fantasy: The Animation (2017) — Storyboard (ep. 4)
- Hinako Note (2017) — Storyboard (ep. 11)
- Fate/Apocrypha (2017) — Storyboard (eps. 10, 19)
- Citrus (2018) — Storyboard (ep. 6)
- Wasteful Days of High School Girls (2019) — Storyboard (ep. 8)
- Re:Zero − Starting Life in Another World (2020, 2026) — Storyboard (eps. 27, 81)
- Lupin the 3rd Part 6 (2021) — Storyboard (ep. 12)
- Buddy Daddies (2023) — Storyboard (ep. 7)
- Stardust Telepath (2023) — Storyboard (ep. 9)
