= James Blatch Piggott Dennis =

- Born: 4 August 1815
- Died: 13 January 1861 (aged 45); Bury St Edmunds
- Education: Bedford School; The Queen's College, Oxford
- Occupations: paleontologist and natural historian

James Blatch Piggott Dennis (1815–1861) was an English paleontologist and natural historian.

== Biography ==
James Dennis was born on 4 August 1815 and educated at Bedford School and The Queen's College, Oxford. He was ordained in 1839.

Dennis is best known for his microscopic research into the internal structure of bone, of which he provided an account in papers published in the Journal of Microscopical Science. He is credited with having established two important geological facts: the existence of mammals prior to the lias deposit, and the existence of birds during, or prior to, the deposit of the Stonesfield slate.

A mammal jawbone which Dennis discovered in the Stonesfield slate was the subject of a paper read to the Geological Society. In 1860, Dennis read a paper to the British Association "On the Mode of Flight of the Sterodactyles of the Coprolite bed near Cambridge".

Besides contributing papers to the Journal of Microscopical Science and others, Dennis was the author of various pamphlets on theological and scientific subjects. He died on 13 January 1861 in Bury St Edmunds.
