= List of Boogiepop media =

This is a list of media in Boogiepop series created by Kouhei Kadono. This metaseries consists of 23 light novels, three four-volume light novel spin-offs, a live-action movie, two anime, four manga, audio CDs, and other books.

An oddity of the titles of Boogiepop series is that they are almost always made of more than one title, and there is often a mix of English and Japanese ones. This list provides the English release title, the Japanese title (and transliteration), with any further subtitles below.

== Light novels ==
- 1. Boogiepop and Others (ブギーポップは笑わない, Bugīpoppu wa Warawanai)
  Boogiepop and Others (Japan) 10 February 1998; ISBN 4-8402-0804-2 (United States) 14 February 2006; ISBN 1-933164-16-6

An alien being chases an escaped clone of itself, a man-eater hiding in Shinyo Academy. As students disappear one by one, people begin to wonder if they are being taken by the legendary Boogiepop.

- 2. Boogiepop Returns: VS Imaginator Part 1 (ブギーポップ·リターンズ VSイマジネーターPart 1, Bugīpoppu Ritānzu vs. Imajinētā Part 1)
  "Sign" (Japan) 10 August 1998; ISBN 4-07-309430-0 (United States) 21 June 2006; ISBN 1-933164-20-4

One year ago, Boogiepop defeated Imaginator which seems to be trying to return. Jin Asakura, who can see people's hearts as plants, is visited by the phantom of Imaginator's last host. Meanwhile, two agents from the Towa Organisation are trying to find Boogiepop. Whilst Camille tries to lure out Boogiepop indirectly, Spooky E finds himself face-to-face with Shinyo Academy's shinigami.

- 3. Boogiepop Returns: VS Imaginator Part 2 (ブギーポップ·リターンズ VSイマジネーターPart 2, Bugīpoppu Ritānzu vs. Imajinētā Part 2)
  "Parade" (Japan) 10 August 1998; ISBN 4-07-309447-5 (United States) 15 October 2006; ISBN 4-07-309447-5
- 4. Boogiepop in the Mirror: "Pandora" (ブギーポップ·イン·ザ·ミラー 「パンドラ」, Bugīpoppu in za Mirā "Pandora")
  Does anybody really know what time is it? (Japan) 10 December 1998; ISBN 4-07-310350-4 (United States) 19 July 2018 (e-book); 5 February 2019; ISBN 978-1-642750-38-6 (print)

Six children with the ability to predict the future, each in different ways. One day, Boogiepop begins to enter their premonitions.

- 5. Boogiepop Overdrive: The King of Distortion (ブギーポップ·オーバードライブ 歪曲王, Bugīpoppu Oobādoraibu Waikyokuō)
  Heartbreaker II (Japan) 10 February 1999; ISBN 4-07-310887-5 (United States) 9 August 2018 (e-book); 5 February 2019; ISBN 978-1-642750-38-6 (print)

Teratsuki Kyouichiro, a man with connections to the Towa Organisation, constructed The Moon Temple, but has now suddenly died. The building is to be demolished in a month's time, but an accident seals visitors to the building, allowing the King of Distortion to manifest.

- 6. Boogiepop at Dawn (夜明けのブギーポップ, Yoake no Bugīpoppu)
  Boogiepop at Dawn (Japan) 10 May 1999; ISBN 4-8402-1197-3 (United States) 5 August 2008; ISBN 978-1-934876-06-0

The prequel to the Boogiepop series. A serial killer is stalking the streets, meanwhile Kirima Nagi is hospitalised with an unknown disease, and Miyashita Touka begins to exhibit unusual behaviour.

- 7. Boogiepop Missing: Peppermint Wizard (ブギーポップ·ミッシング ペパーミントの魔術師, Bugīpoppu Misshingu: Pepāminto no Majutsushi)
  Peppermint wizard, or Rize and fall of poor innocent puppet (Japan) 10 August 1999; ISBN 4-8402-1250-3

After trying the Peppermint ice cream made by Kigawa Tosuke, Teratsuki Kyouichiro uses him to start a chain known as The Peppermint Wizard. The ice cream is able to take away people's pain, but does not go unnoticed by the Towa Organisation.

- 8. Boogiepop Countdown: Embryo Erosion (ブギーポップ·カウントダウン エンブリオ浸蝕, Bugīpoppu Kauntodaun: Enburio Shinshoku)
  "The Embryo" 1st half (Erosion) (Japan) 10 December 1999; ISBN 4-8402-1358-5

A mysterious virus named Embryo begins infecting portable gaming systems. Anyone exposed to this virus soon begins to develop special abilities.

- 9. Boogiepop Wicked: Embryo Eruption (ブギーポップ·ウィキッド エンブリオ炎生, Bugīpoppu Wikido: Enburio Enjyō)
  "The Embryo" 2nd half (Eruption) (Japan) 10 February 2000; ISBN 4-8402-1414-X
- 10. Boogiepop Paradox: Heartless Red (ブギーポップ·パラドックス ハートレス·レッド, Bugīpoppu Paradokkusu: Hātoresu Reddo)
  The Unusual Contact of Vermilion Hurt & Fire Witch (Japan) 10 February 2001; ISBN 4-8402-1736-X

A prequel to Boogiepop and Others and Boogiepop Returns: VS Imaginator. No sooner does Kirima Nagi return to middle school than a series of strange incidents occurs.

- 11. Boogiepop Unbalance: Holly & Ghost (ブギーポップ·アンバランス ホーリィ&ゴースト, Bugīpoppu Anbaransu: Hōryi & Goosuto)
  Holy and Ghost are steeped in plastic crimes (Japan) 10 September 2001; ISBN 4-8402-1896-X

A pair of delinquents seek to release an enemy of the world known as Rock Bottom.

- 12. Boogiepop Stacatto: Welcome to Jinx Shop (ブギーポップ·スタッカート ジンクス·ショップへようこそ, Bugīpoppu Sutakkāto Jinkusu Shoppu e Yōkoso)
  Welcome to Jinx Shop (Japan) 10 March 2003; ISBN 4-8402-2293-2

Meet Oxygen, the head of the Towa Organisation, and learn about the Organisation's agenda: world domination.

- 13. Boogiepop Bounding: Lost Moebius (ブギーポップ·バウンディング ロスト·メビウス, Bugīpoppu Baundeingu: Rosuto Mebiusu)
  Lost in Moebius (Japan) 10 April 2005; ISBN 4-8402-3018-8

Crossing over with the Night Watch Trilogy, Orihata Aya and a boy seeking vengeance on Boogiepop become trapped in a world known as 'Kiba no Ato'.

- 14. Boogiepop Intolerance: The Ark of Orpheus (ブギーポップ·イントレランス オルフェの方舟, Bugīpoppu Intorerinsu: Orufe no Hakobune)
  Ark of Orpheus (Japan) 10 April 2006; ISBN 4-8402-3384-5

A boy discovers his girlfriend is an MPLS, and both the Towa Organization and Boogiepop are after her.

- 15. Boogiepop Question: The Pyramid in Silence (ブギーポップ·クエスチョン 沈黙ピラミッド, Bugīpoppu Kuesuchon: Chinmoku Piramiddo)
  The Silent Pyramid (Japan) 10 January 2008; ISBN 4-8402-4141-4
- 16. Boogiepop Darkly: The Scat Singing Cat (ブギーポップ·ダークリー 化け猫とめまいのスキャット, Bugīpoppu Dākurī: Bakeneko to Memai no Sukkyatto)
  The Scat Singing Cat (Japan) 10 December 2009; ISBN 978-4-04-868197-1
- 17. Boogiepop Unknown: Into The Lunar Rainbow (ブギーポップ·アンノウン 壊れかけのムーンライト, Bugīpoppu Announ Kowarekake no Mūnraito)
  Into The Lunar Rainbow (Japan) 10 January 2011; ISBN 978-4-04-870122-8
- 18. Boogiepop Within: Paradigm Rust (ブギーポップ·ウィズイン さびまみれのバビロン, Bugīpoppu Wizuin: Sabimamire no Babiron)
  Paradigm Rust (Japan) 10 September 2013; ISBN 978-4-04-891870-1
- 19. Boogiepop Changeling: Stalking in Decadent Black (ブギーポップ·チェンジリング 溶暗のデカダント·ブラック, Bugīpoppu Chenjiringu Youan no Dekadanto Burakku)
  Stalking in Decadent Black (Japan) 10 November 2014; ISBN 978-4-04-869047-8
- 20. Boogiepop Antithesis: Revolt of Alternative Ego (ブギーポップ·アンチテーゼ オルタナティヴ·エゴの乱逆, Bugīpoppu Anchitēze: Orutanathibu Ego no Rangyaku)
  Revolt of Alternative Ego (Japan) 10 March 2016; ISBN 978-4-04-865831-7
- 21. Boogiepop Doubtful: Rabbit Run Rapidly (ブギーポップ·ダウトフル 不可抗力のラビット・ラン, Bugīpoppu Dautofuru: Fukakou no Rabitto Ran)
  Rabbit Run Rapidly (Japan) 7 July 2017; ISBN 978-4-04-893233-2
- 22. Boogiepop Beautiful: The Kingcraft of Panic-Cute (ブギーポップ·ビューティフル パニックキュートの帝王学, Bugīpoppu Byutifuru: Panikku Kyūto no Teiougaku)
  Kingcraft of Panic-Cute (Japan) 10 April 2018; ISBN 978-4-04-893800-6
- 23. Boogiepop Almighty: When Dizzy Thinks of Lizzy (ブギーポップ・オールマイティ ディジーがリジーを想うとき, Bugīpoppu Ōrumaiti: Dijī ga Rijī o Omou Toki)
  When Dizzy Thinks of Lizzy (Japan) 10 May 2019; ISBN 978-4-04-912323-4
- 24. Boogiepop Is Cursed (ブギーポップは呪われる)
  Boogiepop Is Cursed (Japan) 8 September 2023; ISBN 978-4-04-915264-7
- 25. Boogiepop Puzzled: The Strongest Mocks Decadence and Contradiction (ブギーポップ・パズルド最強は堕落と矛盾を嘲笑う)
  The Strongest Mocks Decadence and Contradiction (Japan) 7 June 2024; ISBN 978-4-04-915695-9
- 26. Boogiepop Nightmare: Children, Don't Dance with Nightmares (ブギーポップ・ナイトメア悪夢と踊るな子供たち)
  Children, Don't Dance with Nightmares (Japan) 10 July 2025; ISBN 978-4-04-916405-3

These serialized novels take place within the Boogiepop universe:

- Beat's Discipline Side 1 (ビートのディシプリン Side 1, Bēto no Dishipurin Side 1)
  Beat's Discipline Side 1 (Exile) (Japan) 10 March 2002; ISBN 4-8402-2056-5
- Beat's Discipline Side 2 (ビートのディシプリン Side 2, Bēto no Dishipurin Side 2)
  Beat's discipline Side 2 (Fracture) (Japan) 10 August 2003; ISBN 4-8402-2430-7
- Beat's Discipline Side 3 (ビートのディシプリン SIDE3, Bēto no Dishipurin Side 3)
  Beat's discipline Side 3 (Providence) (Japan) 10 September 2004; ISBN 4-8402-2778-0
- Beat's Discipline Side 4 (ビートのディシプリン Side 4, Bēto no Dishipurin Side 4)
  Beat's discipline Side 4 (Indiscipline) (Japan) 10 April 2005; ISBN 4-8402-3120-6
- Repent Walpurgis Fire 1 (ヴァルプルギスの後悔 Fire 1, Varpurugisu no Kōkai Fire1)
  Repent Walpurgis Fire 1 [Warning Witch] (Japan) 10 August 2008; ISBN 978-4-04-867171-2
- Repent Walpurgis Fire 2 (ヴァルプルギスの後悔 Fire 2, Varpurugisu no Kōkai Fire 2)
  Repent Walpurgis Fire 2 [Spitting Witch] (Japan) 10 August 2009; ISBN 978-4-04-867938-1
- Repent Walpurgis Fire 3 (ヴァルプルギスの後悔 Fire3, Varpurugisu no Kōkai Fire 3)
  Repent Walpurgis Fire 3 [Dozing Witch] (Japan) 10 August 2010; ISBN 978-4-04-868767-6
- Repent Walpurgis Fire 4 (ヴァルプルギスの後悔 Fire4, Varpurugisu no Kōkai Fire 4)
  Repent Walpurgis Fire 4 [Freezing Witch] (Japan) 10 December 2011; ISBN 978-4-04-886187-8
- The Emperoider Spin 1 (螺旋のエンペロイダー Spin1., Rasen no Enperoidā Spin 1)
  The Emperoider Spin 1 [Wormy Empire] (Japan) 10 April 2013; ISBN 978-4-04891414-7
- The Emperoider Spin 2 (螺旋のエンペロイダー Spin2., Rasen no Enperoidā Spin 2)
  The Emperoider Spin 2 [Gravelly Empire] (Japan) 10 June 2014; ISBN 978-4-04-866638-1
- The Emperoider Spin 3 (螺旋のエンペロイダー Spin3., Rasen no Enperoidā Spin 3)
  The Emperoider Spin 3 [Haunted Empire] (Japan) 10 December 2015; ISBN 978-4-04-865590-3
- The Emperoider Spin 4 (螺旋のエンペロイダー Spin4., Rasen no Enperoidā Spin 4)
  The Emperoider Spin 4 [Fallen Empire] (Japan) 10 January 2017; ISBN 978-4-04-892602-7

== Short stories ==
- Metal Guru (メタル·グゥルー, Metaru Guuruu)
  Metal Guru (Japan) 18 June 1999
- London Calling (ロンドン·コーリング, Rondon Kooringu)
  London Calling (Japan) 18 September 1999
- My Death Waits (死神を待ちながら, Shinigami o Michinagara)
  My Death Waits (Japan) 18 December 1999
- Boogiepop Poplife (ブギートーク·ポップライフ, Bugīpoppu Poppuraifu)
  Boogietalk, Poplife (in Petssounds) (Japan) 25 February 2000
- Chariot Choogle (チャリオット·チューグル, Chariotto Chooguru)
  Chariot Choogle (Japan) 18 March 2000
- Angel Volume (天使篇 – 真贋について, Tenshi-hen: Shingan ni Tsuite)
  (Japan) 25 September 2003

== Anime ==
=== Boogiepop Phantom ===
One month ago, an unknown pillar of light pierced the sky over the city. Now, strange events begin to take place. Some people are disappearing, others are beginning to show signs of highly evolved powers, while others are seeing apparitions of people who should be dead. Rumors circulate about urban legend Boogiepop being involved.

No.	Title	Directed by	Written by	Original release date	U.S. air date
1	"Portraits from Memory"; Transliteration: "Kioku no Shōzō" (Japanese: 記憶の肖像)	Kenji Yasuda	Sadayuki Murai	5 January 2000	July 29, 2003
Moto Tonomura, a shy girl with obsessive compulsive habits, has harbored a crush on fellow student Masami Saotome, but never expressed it to him. Saotome disappears, but a month later Moto sees him appear in an alley, looking like a ghost. She follows the apparition and confesses her love to him, and when he says he wants to eat her, she agrees. Boogiepop, a mysterious figure wearing a black stovepipe hat, appears and kills the fake Saotome; they claim that the real Saotome is dead, and was killed by Boogiepop themself.
2	"Light in Darkness"; Transliteration: "Yami no Tomoshibi" (Japanese: 闇の灯火)	Mitsuhiro Yoneda	Sadayuki Murai	12 January 2000	July 30, 2003
Since the pillar of light appeared, Hijiridani High School student Hisashi Jounouchi, has seen visions of spider-like bugs attached to people's hearts. By removing these bugs, he is able to free them from their pain by removing their memories. Hisashi becomes addicted to eating the bugs, and his strange behavior attracts the attention of a policeman who begins to follow him. Jounouchi encounters the Boogiepop Phantom who takes him to place of light where he finds happiness.
3	"Life Can Be So Nice"; Transliteration: "Sekai o Ukeireshi mono" (Japanese: 世界を受け入れし者)	Masahiko Murata	Seishi Minakami	19 January 2000	July 31, 2003
At Hijiridani High School, Misuzu Arito has taken the nickname of Panuru, her friend who had a great love for the world, but was killed by a serial killer. Misuzu pretends to accept fate, but secretly knows that she is not like Panuru. When her friend Yoko Sasaoka talks about the disappearance of Jounouchi, Misuzu introduces her to Masami Saotome, a shinigami who kills her while promising to relieve her sadness. Nagi Kirima confronts Misuzu about her actions, but is ignored, so the shinigami sets a trap. However, Boogiepop appears first and confronts Misuzu over her duplicity, leaving her distraught. She runs for help, only to meet a policeman who slaughters her and takes her body just as Kirima appears.
4	"My Fair Lady"; Transliteration: "Kegarenaki Shōjo e no Ai" (Japanese: けがれなき少女への愛)	Jōhei Matsuura	Yasuyuki Nojiri	26 January 2000	August 1, 2003
Yoji Suganuma, a loser, is pushed by his father to do better in school. However, he spends his spare time with Rie, a girlfriend in a dating game on his computer. Yoji becomes attracted to a new girl who starts working with him at his part-time job in a restaurant, and with the influence of a new aromatherapy drug, 'Type-S', he becomes emboldened to attempt to control her like Rie. Suganuma becomes addicted to the drug which is designed to make slaves of its users by the original Masami Saotome, and the lines between fiction and reality blur, resulting in confusion and insanity. His arrest in the street is witnessed by Misuzu and Yoko.
5	"Interlude"; Transliteration: "Kansō" (Japanese: 間奏)	Kenji Yasuda	Sadayuki Murai	2 February 2000	August 5, 2003
Officer Morita idly discusses with Officer Yamamoto rumors of the rumored secret Towa Organization and how they oppose change and dispose of certain humans who have evolved 'special' powers. Meanwhile Kazuko Suema seeks the truth of those events from five years ago when she was stalked by a serial killer from Nagi Kirima. Her quest to uncover Nagi's secret leads Suema back to the prefecture's hospital and a very mysterious girl Touka Miyashita. 70 year old Miyo Kisaragi is found dead in her home which has become overgrown inside with vegetation. Morita mentions how the Towa Organization released a composite human which can change its appearance to hunt down the evolved humans, called "Snake Eye". He reveals that he is the killer, but keeps wiping Yamamoto's memory each time he tells him.
6	"Mother's Day"; Transliteration: "Nanji, Haha o Aise yo" (Japanese: 汝、母を愛せよ)	Mitsutaka Noshitani	Yasuyuki Nojiri	9 February 2000	August 6, 2003
Mr. Wakasa never reconciled with her mother after Shizue befriended Mayumi, a pregnant single woman she met during therapy. Shizue was killed two years later by a serial killer and five years after her death her mother reads Shizue's diaries.
7	"Until Ure In My Arms Again"; Transliteration: "Yo ni Kanawanu Negai Naku" (Japanese: 世にかなわぬ願いなく)	Jirō Yamada	Seishi Minakami	16 February 2000	August 7, 2003
Mamoru Oikawa, who is cruel to everyone, seeks "useless" things following his father's failure to keep his promise and attend Mamoru's school play. After the pillar of light incident, he gained the ability to destroy anything or anyone that meets his criteria. Meanwhile at the police station, Morita has a visit from Spooky Electric who states that Echoes may have followed the Manticore there, and leaves to pursue the evolved humans. Mamoru decides to destroy his father's failed project, the Paisley amusement park. Morita tracks Manaka Kisaragi to Paisley Park and prepare to possess Mamoru, but Sayoko destroys him, revealing that she is the one with power to fulfill his wishes.
8	"She's So Unusual"; Transliteration: "Kanojo no Ikikata" (Japanese: 彼女の生き方)	Megumi Yamamoto	Sadayuki Murai	23 February 2000	August 8, 2003
Nagi Kirima encounters journalist Ichiro Kishida, who reminds her of her first childhood crush, Shinpei Kuroda. He follows her as she hunts the Manticore, a flesh eating shape-shifter. They find Echoes who has the appearance of Boogiepop Phantom. They soon run into the Manticore with the appearance of Saotome Masami, but she is not fooled. Kirima attacks him, but Boogiepop Phantom intervenes and almost destroys the Manticore. Boogiepop Phantom explains that he is responsible for some of the recent disappearances, but it is for their own good.
9	"You'll Never be Young Twice"; Transliteration: "Sugisarishi Waga Toki" (Japanese: 過ぎ去りし我が時)	Kenji Yasuda	Yasuyuki Nojiri	1 March 2000	August 12, 2003
Saki Yoshizawa, a piano student who is determined to make it into a music university, is shattered by a private music teacher and loses hope. One day, she receives a strange phone call urging her to "Come play with us" and goes to Paisley Park where Poom Poom gives her a red balloon, and she joins the group of happy children. After Saki returns home and is confronted by the reality of playing the piano again, she kills herself. Yoshiki, another student unhappy with his life also receives the same strange phone call, and after accepting a red balloon, begins calling others, recruiting them to join Poom Poom's group of children who have abandoned their normal lives. Eventually, Boogiepop Phantom appears and takes Yoshiki away to prevent him from making more calls.
10	"Poom Poom"; Transliteration: "Pūmu Pūmu" (Japanese: プームプーム)	Yūzō Satō	Seishi Minakami	8 March 2000	August 13, 2003
More and more people accept red balloons, which causes Nagi to go to Paisely Park to investigate. At the park, there are childhood versions of everyone who received a balloon and they attack her. Boogiepop arrives and causes Manaka to fall from the Ferris Wheel. All the lights in the park go out, and Manaka appears to have greatly aged as a result of overusing her powers. With her downfall, all the phantom children disappear and Poom Poom vanishes in a flash of light, leaving Manaka alone with Boogiepop.
11	"Rainbow (Under The Gravity's Rainbow)"; Transliteration: "Niji" (Japanese: 虹)	Tsutomu Yabuki	Sadayuki Murai	15 March 2000	August 14, 2003
Manaka's past is revealed, from her birth after her father left and her mother did not recall the birth. She was raised by her grandmother who called her "the devil's child", and spent her whole life locked away from the world, but learning about it through the butterflies of light which only she could see. Manaka was only five when her grandmother grew old and weak and she killed Manaka before she herself died. Manaka was brought back to life when the pillar of light appeared, matured quickly, and attained a superior intellect over the next few days before venturing out into the outside world. However, she was prevented from utilizing those faculties, and was reduced to repeating simple words that she heard, and became Echoes. Boogiepop Phantom prepares to kill her, but Boogiepop intercedes because she is no longer a threat. As Manaka dies, she becomes a stream of light butterflies and visits her mother in the hospital before disappearing in a pillar of light.
12	"A Requiem"; Transliteration: "Nemuri Niyotte Subete ga Owaru" (Japanese: 眠りによって全てが終わる)	Kenji Yasuda	Sadayuki Murai	22 March 2000	August 15, 2003
One year later, the distorted rainbow over the city has disappeared and all seems peaceful, but murders of office ladies still occur. Kazuko Suema and Touka Miyashita travel to Tokyo for university entrance exams, but Touka disappears during the test. Meanwhile the private detective Ichiro Kishida lures an office lady into his apartment, but as he is about to kill her Boogiepop arrives. Boogiepop explains that he is the dead Shinpei Kuroda, a former agent of the Towa Organization, who has assumed the identity of Ichiro Kishida and is possessed by the residual Manticore that was preserved by Manaka. Kuroda prevents Manticore from leaving his body, then Boogiepop destroys them both with an electromagnetic bomb. Later, Kazuko, Touka and Nagi reunite at their school graduation, then say farewell to each other as they go their separate ways.

=== Boogiepop and Others ===
Marking the 20th Anniversary of Kouhei Kadono's original novel debut and announced at the Dengeki Bunko's 25th Anniversary & New Work Unveiling Stage, a series based on Boogiepop and Others, Boogiepop Returns: Vs. Imaginator, Boogiepop at Dawn, and Boogiepop Overdrive: The King of Distortion aired from January 4 to March 29, 2019. The series updated the setting to the present day.

No.	Title	Directed by	Original air date
1	"Boogiepop And Others 1"; Transliteration: "Bugīpoppu wa Warawanai 1" (Japanese: ブギーポップは笑わない 1)	Shingo Natsume	4 January 2019
Seiji Takeda waits all day for his girlfriend Touka Miyashita who never shows. In the evening, a pale zombie-like man stumbles through the crowd and is saved from falling by someone dressed as Boogiepop, whom Takeda recognizes as Tōka. The next day at school, students are told about the four girls who have gone missing and to be on guard. Seiji eventually finds Tōka dressed as Boogiepop who reveals that she has a split personality, and does not have knowledge of her Boogiepop persona which has surfaced to save humanity. She tells Seiji that a man-eating monster resides within someone at the school, while rumors spread that Boogiepop is the killer. Kamikishiro goes missing, but Boogiepop tells Seiji that the danger has passed and Boogiepop will disappear.
2	"Boogiepop And Others 2"; Transliteration: "Bugīpoppu wa Warawanai 2" (Japanese: ブギーポップは笑わない 2)	Katsuya Shigehara	4 January 2019
As Suema walks home from school with Kyōko Kinoshita, Kyōko is attacked by Nagi suspecting that she is the Manticore. Meanwhile, the Manticore kills and devours student Minako Yurihara, observed by Masami Saotome. Later, Kyouko tells Suema that Akiko Kusatsu has been handing out drugs at school, that some of the girls who took them have disappeared and that Nagi Kirima has been investigating. Suema visits Nagi at home and is surprised to find that her father is the famous author, Seiichi Kirima. Flashbacks show that Masami encountered the Manticore and formed a pact to help find other victims or dupes like Akiko who could distribute drugs to turn people into slaves. Meanwhile, Naoko Kamikishiro explains to Nagi that she found the pale zombie-like man who is an alien, captured by an organization which gave him the name Echoes and cloned him, but the clone became a man-eater. When Naoko goes to meet Echoes whom she had sheltered in the school, the Manticore which now inhabits Yurihara's body, accidentally kills her. Later, while looking for Naoko, Nagi finds Echoes but he cannot speak.
3	"Boogiepop And Others 3"; Transliteration: "Bugīpoppu wa Warawanai 3" (Japanese: ブギーポップは笑わない 3)	Yōsuke Hatta	11 January 2019
When Niitoki, Masami, and Shinjirō broadcast a message over the public address system Nagi attacks and captures them, thinking one may be the Manticore, but Echoes says they are normal. Suddenly, Masami stabs Echoes with a pen and cuts Nagi's throat as the Manticore appears in Yurihara's body. Echoes grabs Nagi and escapes and the Manticore pursues them while Masami threatens Niitoki. The Manticore beats Echoes, as the latter is weakened by a poison in Masami's pen, but Echoes transforms his body into light and transmits himself back to the source. The Manticore prepares to kill Niitoki, however Boogiepop appears, trapping the beast in a web of wires. Shirou kills it by firing an arrow through its head. Later, they find Nagi alive, as Echoes had shared some of his life force to save her. Back at school, Nagi and Niitoki recall how Kyouko said that Echoes was an angel sent by God to pass judgement on humanity which seems to have earned a reprieve, and also how humans are very much indebted Boogiepop for saving them.
4	"Vs, Imaginator 1"; Transliteration: "Vs. Imajinētā 1" (Japanese: VSイマジネーター 1)	Mami Kawano	18 January 2019
Suiko Minahoshi is on the school's rooftop with Boogiepop, who tells her that Nagi's father called her type an Imaginator. Suiko jumps from the roof and dies, but her spirit remains in this world and later on appears before Guidance Counselor Jin Asukai on the street. He has always been able to see what was missing in people's hearts, using his skill to make them feel better. Suiko, now calling herself the Imaginator, offers him a chance to develop his power, but he refuses, so she later possesses his cousin and offers him a possible future which he again rejects. She appears again before him as the drug-addicted student Imazaki Shizuko and she slits her throat, highlighting his inability to help others as much as he could. However later, when Jin encounters three boys bullying a girl, he tests the power that the Imaginator offered him. Later, when the female student Komiya prepares to jump from a building to join her friend Suiko in death, Boogiepop appears and says she cannot join Suiko as she has not finished falling. Boogipop then contemplates what the Imaginator's true intentions are.
5	"Vs. Imaginator 2"; Transliteration: "Vs. Imajinētā 2" (Japanese: VSイマジネーター 2)	Hiromichi Matano	25 January 2019
This episode depicts how Masaki Taniguchi met his girlfriend Aya Orihata, after he was being bullied and she intervened. Aya seems to lack self-confidence, meanwhile Shinjirou Anou follows them, wondering what Masaki sees in Aya. A Synthetic Human called Spooky E appears and wipes Shinjirō's memory and makes him a "terminal", a servant of the Towa Organization, instructing him to enroll in the Shinyou Academy. While there, Shinjirou meets Jin Asukai who breaks the Towa's control. Later, when the Tower operative tries to "reset" Shinjirō, Boogiepop appears looking for the Imaginator and saves Shinjirou. Later, Aya agrees to meet Masaki, but Spooky E appears first, calling her Camille.
6	"Vs. Imaginator 3"; Transliteration: "Vs. Imajinētā 3" (Japanese: VSイマジネーター 3)	Kazuo Nogami	1 February 2019
Spooky E grabs Aya and instructs her to advance her relationship with Masaki to determine if synthetic humans can interbreed with normal humans. He also gives her new orders to draw out Boogiepop, whom Spooky E is trying to kill. Suddenly, Masaki appears and attacks Spooky-E, but he is knocked out with an electrical impulse. Masaki awakes with no memory of the previous encounter, and Aya presses him for anything he has heard about Boogiepop. Meanwhile, Kinukawa Kotoe seeks out Suema asking her to help her cousin Jin Asukai who has been behaving strangely. Suema finds a drawing of Suiko Minahoshi in Asukai's office. She then sees Asukai arrive with two female students, and he touches them with a blinding red light. As they leave the girls say they no longer fear anything. Later, Suema finds Aya on a rooftop in a suicidal mood over her inability to act on her affection for Masaki. Suema encourages her to take pleasure in life and fulfill her goals, and that Boogiepop may be the answer. Later, Aya suggests to Masaki that he become Boogiepop. He agrees, although he doesn't really understand what that means.
7	"Vs. Imaginator 4"; Transliteration: "Vs. Imajinētā 4" (Japanese: VSイマジネーター 4)	Keiichirō Saitō	8 February 2019
Aya steals drugs from some street dealers, but when they give chase they are scared off by Boogiepop, who is Masaki in disguise. They continue the charade for some weeks, but it fails to draw out the real Boogiepop, so Spooky E orders Aya to stop seeing Masaki. It is revealed that Spooky E is coordinating efforts to drug random civilians on behalf of Towa, and to monitor the results of these experiments. As Kotoe Kinukawa reminisces about her past with her cousin Jin, she is suddenly shocked by Spooky E and her memory is wiped. Later she make inquiries about the Imaginator at a music studio and is told by the manager that the Imaginator appears to have the power to "turn people to his side", and so she hires him to gather some support. Later, Masaki encounters Aya and Kotoe in a café, and is angry that Aya has avoided him. He decides to continue the Boogiepop charade against Aya's wishes. Earlier, Kotoe had told Aya to try to breed with Masaki but she is reluctant to do so. As Aya leaves, she is caught by Spooky E.
8	"Vs. Imaginator 5"; Transliteration: "Vs. Imajinētā 5" (Japanese: VSイマジネーター 5)	Katsuya Shigehara	15 February 2019
Jin reflects on a passage about sacrifice from Kirima Seiichi's book, The Victor's Principle. Later, Suema questions Jin about the change in Kotoe's demeanor, and he offers to fill the void in her heart, but she declines. After she leaves, Suiko appears, and Jin tells her that he must finally confront Spooky E. Meanwhile Masaki is followed by Kotoe and her hired thugs, but Masaki changes into his Boogipop costume and beats them up. Just as he threatens to kill Kotoe, Nagi arrives and stops him. When Kotoe doesn't recognize her, Nagi realizes that Kotoe is not the same person she was and renders her unconscious. When Kotoe awakes, she sees Jin who sees into her heart and explains why she was attracted to him, breaking Spooky E's control of her. Jin then appears before Spooky E at his headquarters, revealing that he is the one they call the Imaginator and confronting him about his activities for the Towa Organization. Jin berates Spooky E for the suffering and deaths of several people given the drugs, including his own mentor. He explains his plan to use Spooky E as the vehicle for the Imaginator to take over the Towa Organization so that he can standardize humanity's psyche and end disconnects and misunderstandings in the world. When Spooky E tries to attack him, Jin simply removes his capacity for aggression, but Spooky E then uses his remaining electrical power to kill himself. Jin finds Aya in the building, but declines to free her, deciding she will be the sacrifice he needs now that Spooky E is dead.
9	"Vs. Imaginator 6"; Transliteration: "Vs. Imajinētā 6" (Japanese: VSイマジネーター 6)	Yōsuke Hatta	22 February 2019
Masaki telephones Aya, who tries to brush him off under duress from Jin, but Masaki suspects something is wrong. Jin tells Aya that he will remove her heart to sow a seed within the city to remove people's pain. Suema visits Kotoe in hospital and she asks who was controlling her, but all Kotoe recalls is Paisley Park and the name Jin. Meanwhile, Masaki goes to Paisley Park, where he is assaulted by people wearing themed costumes, but he is saved by Boogiepop who tells him that he has been manipulated. Boogiepop then confronts Jin, and Aya reveals that his plan to spread her heart among humans in the city would not work because she is a synthetic human. Jin realizes his efforts were doomed from the start and attacks Boogiepop. She blasts him from the park's tower but saves him as he falls, declaring that he wasn't worth killing. Boogiepop tells Aya that she is wrong to think that his plan wouldn't work because she wasn't human, but rather because her love for Masaki was protecting her heart. Suema arrives at Paisley Park as Masaki regains consciousness and is reunited with Aya. A still-floating Suiko appears before Masaki and complements him on his strength, lamenting that Jin was too weak to serve her purposes before finally landing on the ground and disappearing.
10	"Boogiepop at Dawn 1"; Transliteration: "Yoake no Bugīpoppu 1" (Japanese: 夜明けのブギーポップ 1)	Katsuya Shigehara	23 February 2019
At dawn on a ruined alien world, Echoes encounters Boogiepop as if for the first time, and to explain who she is, she begins to tell the story of Scarecrow. Some time ago at the office of the Kuroda Detective Agency, a synthetic human called Pigeon calls on Shinpei Kuroda, a Towa operative known as Scarecrow. She tells him to check up on Teratsuki Kyouiyichi, another synthetic who may have betrayed the Towa organization. Teratsuki is head of the influential MCE company and has donated a large sum of money to a particular hospital, but Kuroda discovers nothing suspicious in his philanthropy. While investigating the hospital, Kuroda encounters a young Nagi Kirima, who has an unknown ailment she describes as 'growing pains', which is being treated by Dr. Kisugi. Kuroda investigates Nagi and find that she is the wealthy daughter of the deceased writer Seiichi Kirima and suspects that she may be an MPLS. Meanwhile, the Towa assassin Mo Murder receives orders to eliminate Kuroda for breaking protocol, having destroyed a chemical facility and stolen drugs. Mo attacks Kuroda in the hospital and mortally wounds him after a long chase, but not before Kuroda administers a drug to Nagi to stop her evolving and restore her humanity. The 'reaper' possessing Touka Miyashita finds the dying Scarecrow and, as his vision fades, he describes her like a bubble that will pop and disappear at any moment, calling her creepy.
11	"Boogiepop at Dawn 2"; Transliteration: "Yoake no Bugīpoppu 2" (Japanese: 夜明けのブギーポップ 2)	Park Myung Hwan	23 February 2019
A patient tells the psychiatrist Dr. Kisugi that he is aware of evil in the world and that lies are being spread to discredit him. She develops a growing obsession with fear, and in particular with those who seem totally fearless. Later, Dr. Kisugi encounters Nagi, who has had a miraculous recovery from her unknown ailment. Dr. Kisugi continues her experiments on rats with an 'evolution-drug' – the remains of the drug Kuroda was giving Nagi – which causes the mice to rapidly regenerate. Meanwhile, she walks the corridors of the hospital at night, looking for opportunities to create fear in patients. The media begins reporting a series of grisly murders happening in the city, targeting young girls. One day, Touka Miyashita's mother takes her to see Dr. Kisugi because of her split personality in which a 'strange man' inhabits her psyche. Dr. Kisugi questions Touka and brings out the 'reaper', who explains his role as an agent created to destroy threats to the world, intimating that Dr. Kisugi may become such a threat.
12	"Boogiepop at Dawn 3"; Transliteration: "Yoake no Bugīpoppu 3" (Japanese: 夜明けのブギーポップ 3)	Kazuo Nogami	23 February 2019
In the past, Seiichi Kirima received a letter from a man who says he had a strange power to help people, but because he posed a threat to society, he was about to be killed. When Seiichi asked his friend to look into it, he reveals that the man died a day after the letter was sent, and that people around him achieved much better results that expected by reducing their own impediments to progress. As Seiichi looks further into it, he suspects that he may also be under observation. Later, Seiichi encounters Suiko Minahoshi in a park and he talks about how danger and the unexpected effect change people's lives. That night, he is attacked and killed by Mo Murder. Nagi arrives home and finds her father in a pool of blood, his last words being to ask what is "normal". Back in the present, Pigeon and Mo discuss the recent murders, and Mo begins to investigate the murder scenes using the name Masanori Sasaki. He encounters Nagi, who is aware of what he is doing and suggests that they work together, unaware that they are being watched by Dr. Kisugi. While investigating the site of Shizue Wakasa's death, they talk to her friend Rika which causes Nagi to suspect Dr. Kisugi.
13	"Boogiepop at Dawn 4"; Transliteration: "Yoake no Bugīpoppu 4" (Japanese: 夜明けのブギーポップ 4)	Keiichirō Saitō	23 February 2019
Sasaki shadows Nagi and sees her prepare weapons for a fight. He follows her to the hospital where he appears to see Dr. Kisugi and Nagi. When Nagi leaves, Sasaki attempts to confront the doctor, but discovers she was a decoy, and was actually Pigeon in disguise. In a flashback, it's revealed that Kisugi had discovered Mo was investigating her and had sought out Pigeon, turning the synthetic against Mo by offering her a chance of vengeance against the man who killed Kuroda. Dr. Kisugi then stabs Sasaki and throws him from the window. She hunts down Nagi with her superhuman speed and strength, cornering her in a shallow lake. Her attempts to extract fear from Nagi are unsuccessful, infuriating her. Nagi describes how she deduced that Dr. Kisugi selected victims who were fearless. Dr. Kisugi tells Nagi who Sasaki really was, and that she intends to frame him for the murders. However, Nagi retaliates with a high voltage electric charge which stuns Dr. Kisugi, enabling Nagi to tear her arm off. Just then a female figure in a long cloak and stovepipe hat appears and kills Dr. Kisugi. Later, when Nagi asks the figure's name, she says she doesn't have one. She decides to call herself Boogiepop after how Kuroda had described her – a boogieman, a bubble that pops after rising to the surface. The scene cuts back to the alien world where Boogiepop finishes her story to Echoes. Echoes tells her he'll continue to fight for Kotoe's sake and asks her if she'll keep fighting, before disappearing. As the alien world begins to crumble, Boogiepop departs.
14	"Overdrive: The King of Distortion 1"; Transliteration: "Oobādoraibu: Waikyokuō 1" (Japanese: オーバードライブ 歪曲王 1)	Mami Kawano	1 March 2019
Huge crowds gather for the grand opening of a strange new building called the Moon Temple. It was built by Teratsuki Kyouichirou as a sort of "Tower of Babel", although he died before it was completed. A young boy, Makoto, goes to the toilet and encounters a curious man who says he was just born. Later, a teenager, Habara Kentarou, joins the long queue and meets his friend Shirou. Meanwhile, Keiji Takeda decides to meet Touka Miyashita at the Moon Temple but is driven into a cafe by the rain. He meets what appears to be Boogiepop, but she says that she is the "King of Distortion", born to turn the world into gold. Kei Niitoki also sees Boogiepop rushing towards the Moon Temple and follows her inside, and Sakiko Michimoto sees Boogiepop inside the cavernous building. Suddenly there is an apparent visual distortion and the security shutters lock everyone inside the building. Niitoki sees him as Saotome Masami, Makoto's mother sees him as Teratsuki who was once her lover, Habara sees his former crush Nagi Kirima, and Sakiko sees her friend Hinako who had died after an estrangement between the two.
15	"Overdrive: The King of Distortion 2"; Transliteration: "Ōbādoraibu Waikyokuō 2" (Japanese: オーバードライブ 歪曲王 2)	Park Myung-hwan; Norikazu Ishigōoka	8 March 2019
Kyōichirō Teratsuki and Makoto's mother sit drinking in a bar, and he offers her money if she keeps the child she is currently bearing, even though she does not know who the father is. Later, Sakiko meets Hinako along a railway line and apologises for offending her years ago. Kentarō Habara meets Nagi Kirima in a café who warn him about his computer hacking activities. However, Habara realizes that it is an illusion and that they are still in the Moon Temple. He flees outside, where he encounters a cowering Makoto, currently being chased by an invisible monster. Habara wakes himself up and finds that everyone in the temple is unconscious, all having their own dreams influenced by the King of Distortion which he suspects is part of Teratsuki's original plan. Makoto's imaginary monster, Zooragi, is breaching the barrier between his dream and reality and is threatening to collapse the building.
16	"Overdrive: The King of Distortion 3"; Transliteration: "Oobādoraibu Waikyokuō 3" (Japanese: オーバードライブ 歪曲王 3)	Masato Nakazono	15 March 2019
Niitoki tells Boogiepop to eliminate the King of Distortion, but Boogiepop does not see him as a threat. People within the building continue to have interactions with someone they know from their past as the result of a lingering in their heart. In flashbacks, Makoto Hashizaka draws a dinosaur-like monster which is his vision of what his father looks like, a beast called Zooragi. It starts to destroy the building, and Boogiepop comes to his rescue, wounding the monster. Boogiepop reveals that, because Makoto now believes her capable of defeating Zooragi, the monster will not be able to escape the dream. Zooragi eventually departs while the building appears to come crashing to the ground. Meanwhile, Sakiko comes to terms with her grief at never having reconciled with Hinako. In a tunnel of brilliant light, the King of Distortions, in Hinako's form, offers to turn her pain into gold.
17	"Overdrive: The King of Distortion 4"; Transliteration: "Oobādoraibu Waikyokuō 4" (Japanese: オーバードライブ 歪曲王 4)	Katsuya Shigehara	22 March 2019
Habara and Shirou wake up Sakiko, who is lying on top of a trapdoor, and ask her about the King of Distortion but she is noncommittal. When the boys descend to the next level, she locks the trapdoor above them so that they can't disrupt the King's plan. They find themselves in an area filled with white human statue-like figures. Suddenly the building turns black and the voice of Kyōichirō Teratsuki tells everyone outside that they cannot enter and tells everyone inside that the air ducts have been sealed so they will soon asphyxiate if they can't find a way out. Niitoki tells Saotome that she understands why he has appeared in her vision. Meanwhile, Sakiko encounters Boogiepop and she asks Boogiepop to kill her because of her previous cruelty to her friend Hina, but Boogiepop responds that it is her inherent kindness that allowed her to talk with Hina and apologize. Habara and Shirou emerge from the basement and find the building's control panel, which activates a video of Teratsuki, who says that he is a creation of the Towa Organization, but became a threat to them, so he built the temple to detest them. He continues by saying that whoever finds the recording will also be a threat to Towa. Habara is shocked at the man's beheading, but Shirō seems oddly unperturbed.
18	"Overdrive: The King of Distortion 5"; Transliteration: "Oobādoraibu Waikyokuō 5" (Japanese: オーバードライブ 歪曲王 5)	Yōsuke Hatta	29 March 2019
Shirō tells Habara that he is the King of Distortion. Meanwhile, Boogiepop meets Niitoki and Shirou in the building's control room and explains how the King of Distortion was created by Shirō's deeply felt guilt over how Naoko Kamikishiro felt about him and his own ambivalence towards her before her sudden death. Even though Naoko was also seeing Kimura Akio, Kei says that she really loved him. Boogiepop explains to Shirou that she is not his enemy as he does not pose a threat to humanity. Shirou then asks Kei to enter the cancellation code into the keyboard of the control panel, which then prompts for a piece of music. Niitoki chooses the overture from "Die Meistersinger von Nürnberg" by Wagner in tribute to Boogiepop. The music starts playing and the building's lock-down is lifted. Those trapped inside slowly regain consciousness as the building, and people's lives, return to normal. Some time later, Boogiepop encounters Takeda on a ruined Earth and tells him that the threat disappears.

== Film ==
- Boogiepop and Others (ブギーポップは笑わない, Bugīpoppu wa Warawanai) (Japan) 11 March 2000 (United States) 1 March 2005

Based on the novel of the same name, the film follows an alien and a man-eater playing a deadly game of cat-and-mouse at Shinyo Academy, and the students are the ones who suffer as a result of this.

== Music ==
Two audio CDs have been released.

Boogiepop Phantom Original Soundtrack, (Japan) 25 February 2000, (United States) 30 April 2002.

Track	Title	Artist
1	Happy End	Flare
2	In Heaven	Silc
3	Penalty Taker	Audio Active
4	Gataway	Susumu Yokota
5	Delirious	Silc feat 2k+D's of Red Line
6	Stormy Soup	AOA
7	Boogiepop Me Up	Ming (DJ) & FS
8	A Furrow Dub	Sugar Plant
9	Torso	Sadesper Record
10	Snow Coast	Yoshihiro Sawasaki
11	Unstability	Hidenobu Ito
12	Pone	Rei Harakami
13	Angel in the Dark	M.Y.K.N.

Music Inspired by Boogiepop and Others, (Japan) 25 March 2000, (United States) 30 April 2002.

Track	Title	Artist
1	Daphne	Yuki Kajiura
2	Sad Bird	Yuki Kajiura
3	Nepenthe #1	Yuki Kajiura
4	Porcelain	Yuki Kajiura
5	Egotism	Yuki Kajiura
6	Forget-me-not	Yuki Kajiura
7	Nepenthe #2	Yuki Kajiura
8	Criss-Cross	Yuki Kajiura
9	Embrace	Yuki Kajiura
10	Boogiepop	Yuki Kajiura
11	Die Meistersinger von Nürnberg Boogiepop Version Classical Mix	Richard Wagner / Yuki Kajiura

== Books ==
- Boogiepop wa Warawanai the Movie: Eiga Fanbook (Japan) 1 March 2000; ISBN 4-8402-1521-9
- The Art of Kōji Ogata: Boogiepop and Others (Japan) 20 April 2000; ISBN 4-8402-1422-0

=== Manga ===
- Boogiepop Doesn't Laugh (ブギーポップは笑わない, Bugīpoppu wa Warawanai)
  Volume 1 (Japan) 1 February 2001; ISBN 4-8402-1754-8 (United States) 24 April 2006; ISBN 1-933164-18-2
  Volume 2 (Japan) December 2002; ISBN 4-8402-2279-7 (United States) 15 July 2006; ISBN 1-933164-21-2

Based on the Boogiepop and Others novel.

- Boogiepop Dual: Losers' Circus (ブギーポップ·デュアル 負け犬たちのサーカス, Bugīpoppu Duaru: Maikenu-tachi no Circus)
  Volume 1 (Japan) 1 April 2000; ISBN 4-8402-1526-X (United States) 15 September 2006; ISBN 1-933164-22-0
  Volume 2 (Japan) 15 December 2000; ISBN 4-8402-1705-X (United States) 15 December 2006 ISBN 1-933164-31-X
