= Boogiepop Returns: VS Imaginator Part 1 =

1998 novel by Kouhei Kadono

- Cover of the English release of Boogiepop Returns: VS Imaginator Part 1
- Author: Kouhei Kadono
- Original title: ブギーポップ・リターンズ ＶＳイマジネーターＰａｒｔ１
- Translator: Andrew Cunningham
- Cover artist: Kouji Ogata
- Language: Japanese, translated into English
- Series: Boogiepop
- Genre: Speculative fiction
- Publisher: (Japan) MediaWorks (United States) Seven Seas Entertainment
- Publication date: (Japan) August 25, 1998 (United States) June 21, 2006
- Publication place: Japan
- Media type: Print (Paperback)
- Pages: 220
- ISBN: 1-933164-20-4
- Preceded by: Boogiepop and Others
- Followed by: Boogiepop Returns: VS Imaginator Part 2

Boogiepop Returns: VS Imaginator Part 1 (ブギーポップ・リターンズ ＶＳイマジネーターＰａｒｔ１, Bugīpoppu Ritānzu VS Imajinētā Part 1) is the second novel in the Boogiepop series written by Kouhei Kadono and illustrated by Kouji Ogata.

== Plot introduction ==
The year before the incident with Manticore, Boogieopop fought against Imaginator. Now, Imaginator is attempting to return and complete its ambitions. Meanwhile, agents from the Towa Organisation have begun to investigate Boogiepop.

=== Explanation of the novel's title ===
The titles used in the Boogiepop Series can typically be separated into multiple titles. The full title of this novel is Boogiepop Returns: VS Imaginator Part 1 "SIGN". Boogiepop Returns refers to this being the return of the character Boogiepop. VS Imaginator has a double meaning: Imaginator is the key antagonist of the novel, therefore it can be read as 'verses Imaginator', but VS Imaginator is also the name of a fictitious book by Kirima Seiichi – quotes from VS Imaginator are presented at the start of each chapter.

== Plot summary ==
A year before the "pillar of light", Minahoshi Suiko seemed to have killed herself, but Boogiepop claims that he killed her, because she was an enemy of the world. He calls her Imaginator.

Asukai Jin can see people's hearts as parts of plants such as flowers, leaves, buds and roots growing from their chests, but everyone's plant is missing something important: this represents the flaw in their heart. Asukai saw the apparition of a girl, who claimed to be Imaginator. She offered Asukai a vision of a possible future, but he was initially opposed. He tried sketching the apparition's face, but was unable to capture it. The students who sought his counsel often uttered the phrase "sometimes it snows in April"; a phrase used by Imaginator. After meeting a former student, addicted to drugs, and dying, Asukai gave in and reached for her plant; she died happy. After rescuing a boy and a girl from a group of thugs, Asukai identified himself as Imaginator.

Taniguchi Masaki had just moved back to Japan from Phnom Penh, and found himself incredibly popular with the girls at his school, and equally hated by the boys. One day, he failed to notice a group of thugs moving in to attack him. A girl, Orihata Aya, stepped in to help Taniguchi, though her words and actions were far from normal. Before things got out of hand, a man stepped in to save them. The two ended up going out. While waiting for Taniguchi one day, a large man missing his right ear came up to Orihata, calling her "Camille" – he was Spooky E, and they were both from the Towa Organisation. Taniguchi thought to rescue Orihata from the man, but was rendered unconscious.

Miyashita Touka and Suema Kazuko were studying at the cram school where they had met and become friends. Kinukawa Kotoe approached Suema seeking advice about her relative, Asukai Jin. Unable to let things pass her by, Suema promised to look into things. In Asukai's office, she found failed sketches that looked like Minahoshi Suiko. Whilst hiding, she also saw Asukai do "something" near the chests of two girls on behalf of Imaginator – a name she recognized from a book by Kirima Seiichiro. After Asukai had finished, the two girls looked remarkably similar in their relaxed expression.

After the incident with Spooky E, Orihata had explained to Taniguchi about the shinigami, Boogiepop. She asks him to play the part of Boogiepop, and save people. He dressed up as the rumours described Boogiepop, and uses his Karate experience to defeat criminals that she would lure out. However, this fails to draw out the real Boogiepop, so Spooky E instructs Orihata to try a new plan.

When Taniguchi Masaki transferred into his school, Anou Shinjirou fell in love immediately. Confused by his feelings, he directs anger at Taniguchi instead. One day, he convinced a group of younger students to threaten Taniguchi, and watches on from the shadows. At no point did things go according to his plan, especially not when some man suddenly appears and quickly defeats the other students. Anou watches with disgust as the relationship between Taniguchi and Orihata develops.

Hearing rumours about Orihata's frivolous attitude towards men, Anou tries to prove them, so as to break up her relationship with Taniguchi. Unfortunately, all he learns is that she lives like clockwork, and makes no effort to enjoy life. Anou is found by Spooky E, who turns him into his puppet, and orders him to enter Shinyo Academy – following this, Anou would occasionally cry for no apparent reason. Due to the change in his behaviour, Anou receives a love letter, and is instructed by Spooky E to follow it up, but a chance encounter with Asukai Jin frees Anou from Spooky E's control.

When Anou goes to meet the girl who sent the letter to him, he arrives at the roof of a department store. When he saw a girl there, he begins to speak to her, but his words reveal that he had been freed from Spooky E's control – the synthetic human leaps out to erase him at this, but a microfilament wire saves him at the last second. The 'girl' had been none other than Boogiepop himself, who had decided to kill Spooky E for his actions. Despite being significantly overpowered by Boogiepop, Spooky E escapes, at the cost of his right ear. Boogiepop gives Anou the real love letter, which he had exchanged earlier, before leaving.

Before the start of the new school year, Suema returns to Shinyo Academy, as the new students are being orientated, meeting up eventually and shortly with Niitoki Kei (and hearing that she is no longer head of the Displinary Committee from Niitoki). Anou and his girlfriend arrive at Shinyo Academy, but he questions why he is there in the first place. Whilst looking down at the place where Minahoshi Suiko had killed herself, Suema meets Orihata Aya. Orihata asks Suema about Boogiepop, but she brushes it off as a fantasy to "protect an unstable heart." Suema quotes Kirima Seiichi's VS Imaginator hoping to reassure Orihata about her way in life.

== Characters ==
Anou Shinjirou (安能慎二郎, Anō Shinjirō)

A middle-school student, Anou is confused by the feelings he has towards Taniguchi Masaki, and so vents his frustrations on him instead.

Minahoshi Suiko (水乃星透子, Minahoshi Suiko)

A girl who jumped off the roof of Shinyo Academy a year ago, but was Boogiepop somehow involved with this incident?

Orihata Aya (織機綺, Orihata Aya)

A middle-school student with a bad reputation (said in the novel to be a slut) and having a strange manner with people, she is actually a synthetic human known as Camille, working under Spooky E in the search for Boogiepop under the Towa Organization.

Spooky E (スプーキーE, Supūkī E)

A synthetic human from the Towa Organisation, Spooky Electric is searching for Boogiepop.

Taniguchi Masaki (谷口正樹, Taniguchi Masaki)

A middle-school student, and the stepbrother of Kirima Nagi, Taniguchi is in love with Orihata Aya.

== Anime ==
Episodes 4 to 9 of Boogiepop and Others adapt the two part novel in an abridged form with a present-day setting.

== Allusions/references to other works ==
Kadono regularly references Western music – especially rock – in the Boogiepop series. This is mostly in the chapter titles, but also in the names of characters. The two Towa Agents in this novel, Orihata and Spooky E, are references to two personalities Prince claims to have: Camille, who is his good side, and Spooky Electric, who is his bad side. The novel begins with a direct reference to Salome, a ballet by Akira Ifukube, where Minahoshi whistles a tune from it. The novel contains two distinct plots, each being references to songs by Prince: If I Was Your Girlfriend was a single from the album Sign "O" the Times, while Sometimes it Snows in April was a single released in 1986.

When Asukai Jin thinks about his powers, he is reminded of a line in The Little Prince, by Antoine de Saint-Exupéry.

== Literary significance & criticism ==
The English release of Boogiepop Returns: VS Imaginator Part 1 has, like the previous title, been praised for its excellent translation. The writing style is compared with that of Ray Bradbury, and is praised for the "great skill" demonstrated in the structure, but it is criticised for being too short and only serving to set the story for the next book, Boogiepop Returns: VS Imaginator Part 2.

== Allusions/references from other works ==
The anime series Boogiepop Phantom makes reference to Orihata's original mission about why Spooky E came to the city.

== Release details ==
- 1998, Japan, MediaWorks (ISBN 4-07-309430-0), Pub date August 25, 1998, Paperback
- 2006, USA, Seven Seas Entertainment (ISBN 1-933164-20-4), Pub date June 21, 2006, Paperback
