= Boogiepop Returns: VS Imaginator Part 2 =

Novel by Kouhei Kadono

- Cover of the English release of Boogiepop Returns: VS Imaginator Part 2
- Author: Kouhei Kadono
- Original title: ブギーポップ・リターンズ ＶＳイマジネーターＰａｒｔ２
- Translator: Andrew Cunningham
- Cover artist: Kouji Ogata
- Language: Japanese, translated into English
- Series: Boogiepop
- Genre: Speculative fiction
- Publisher: (Japan) MediaWorks (United States) Seven Seas Entertainment
- Publication date: (Japan) August 25, 1998 (United States) October 15, 2006
- Publication place: Japan
- Media type: Print (Paperback)
- Pages: 250
- ISBN: 978-4-07-309447-0
- Preceded by: Boogiepop Returns: VS Imaginator Part 1
- Followed by: Boogiepop in the Mirror: "Pandora"

Boogiepop Returns: VS Imaginator Part 2 (ブギーポップ・リターンズ ＶＳイマジネーターＰａｒｔ２, Bugīpoppu Ritānzu VS Imajinētā Part 2) is the third novel in the Boogiepop series written by Kouhei Kadono and illustrated by Kouji Ogata. It was released in English on October 15, 2006 by Seven Seas Entertainment.

== Plot introduction ==
The continuation of Boogiepop Returns: VS Imaginator Part 1. Struggling to recover from his battle with Boogiepop, Spooky E attempts to identify and find the purpose of the Imaginator. Along with his change of plans, Spooky E decides that things with Camille and Taniguchi Masaki must come to an end. Meanwhile, Suema Kazuko discovers that Kinukawa Kotoe has undergone a dramatic change, and Asukai Jin sets his plans to change the world in motion.

=== Explanation of the novel's title ===
The titles used in the Boogiepop Series can typically be separated into multiple titles. The full title of this novel is Boogiepop Returns: VS Imaginator Part 2 "PARADE". Boogiepop Returns refers to this being the return of the character Boogiepop. VS Imaginator has a double meaning: Imaginator is the key antagonist of the novel, therefore it can be read as 'versus Imaginator', but VS Imaginator is also the name of a fictitious book by Kirima Seiichi – quotes from VS Imaginator are presented at the start of most chapters.

== Plot summary ==
Sneaking into Paisley Park to sit with her memories of Asukai Jin, Kinukawa Kotoe fell into the clutches of Spooky E, who had been hiding there since his defeat by Boogiepop. Capturing her as a new terminal, he worked on her to lead his search for Imaginator. Using her vast wealth, the manipulated Kinukawa began recruiting people whose friends had been changed by Imaginator to help find it.

Under the suspicion of Kirima Nagi, Taniguchi Masaki headed off to meet Orihata Aya, planning to again impersonate Boogiepop for her. Kinukawa had already met up with Orihata and had instructed her that this was the end of her relationship with Taniguchi. Trying to save him, Orihata tries to make Taniguchi hate her, but he instead runs off to continue impersonating Boogiepop for her sake.

Spotting one of the girls who had been with Asukai at her school, Suema followed to investigate. The girl had been looking for someone. After, at their cram school, Suema confronts Asukai. Both manage to surprise each other with their knowledge, though neither managed to identify how the other was linked.

Living as 'Boogiepop', Taniguchi stopped returning home. Finding new targets by himself, he continued to act the part of a hero, but was gradually becoming sloppier in his actions. Kinukawa and some of her hired thugs managed to find Taniguchi and tried to use him to kill 'Boogiepop', thereby making the real Boogiepop a fake in the eyes of others. Though able to protect himself against the initial attack, Taniguchi was soon overwhelmed, however, he was rescued by Kirima, who had also been looking for him. She defeated the attackers and freed them all from Spooky E's control. Kinukawa escaped, but was found by Asukai, who restored her to normal, as he had done with many of the other Terminals.

Trying to find Orihata, Taniguchi searched her apartment, but soon realised that she had not returned since they last met. Meanwhile, Spooky E quickly discovered that he had lost all his Terminals, and was soon confronted by Asukai, who identified himself as Imaginator. Protecting himself from Spooky E's powers with anti-magnetic sheets, Asukai grasps Spooky E's 'flower' and begins changing his heart, but the synthetic human chose suicide over being manipulated by Imaginator.

Fearing for Orihata's life, Taniguchi attempts to contact her by phone. She is found by Asukai, who allows her to speak with Taniguchi, but he needs her to be his sacrifice to create his perfect world. From the phone call, Taniguchi was able to deduce that they were at Paisley Park and immediately set off for it. Meanwhile, Suema also discovers that everything is at Paisley Park and makes her own way to the abandoned site.

Breaking into Paisley Park, Taniguchi is confronted by those manipulated by Imaginator. Unable to effectively fight back, he is soon overwhelmed, but at the last moment is saved by a microfilament wire. Accompanied by the Die Meistersinger von Nürnberg, Boogiepop makes his appearance and quickly defeats the manipulated humans. Making his way to where Asukai and Orihata were, Boogiepop appeared before them. From the way she feared him, Asukai deduced that Boogiepop was a powerful opponent, but it was not until his plan to use Orihata fails that he realised that he had lost. After expelling Imaginator, Boogiepop left Orihata and Asukai alone.

Suema arrived at Paisley Park to again find that everything had already finished around her. Suema saved Asukai and helped reunite Orihata and Taniguchi, who need no longer be separated.

== Characters ==
Asukai Jin (飛鳥井仁, Asukai Jin)

| Quote: "I need you to be a sacrifice." |

A cram school teacher, he possesses the ability to see people's hearts in the form of a plant. By altering the plant he can manipulate people's hearts.

Imaginator (イマジネーター, Imajinētā)

| Quote: "It is my function to remake the world." |

A mysterious entity, Imaginator possesses humans and uses them to create the world it desires.

Kinukawa Kotoe (衣川琴絵, Kinukawa Kotoe)

| Quote: "You don't need a reason to do the right thing." |

An ordinary teenage girl, Kinukawa seeks the assistance of Suema Kazuko to help discover what is wrong with her cousin, Asukai.

== Anime ==
Episodes 4 to 9 of Boogiepop and Others adapt the two part novel in an abridged form with a present-day setting.

== Major themes ==
We are all brainwashed in society, even if we do not normally have an individual we can link with this.

== Allusions/references to other works ==
Kadono regularly references Western music – especially rock – in the Boogiepop series. This is mostly in the chapter titles, but also in the names of characters. The two plots in this title reference Prince: Do U Lie? was from the album Parade, while The Sacrifice of Victor is from Love Symbol. The characters frequently reference Sometimes it Snows in April, also from Parade, while some of the events from the volume occur at Paisley Park --- both a song by Prince and the name of his defunct music label. In the climax, Boogiepop has Wagner's Die Meistersinger von Nürnberg playing across Paisley Park.

When Asukai Jin references The Little Prince, by Antoine de Saint-Exupéry.

== Literary significance & criticism ==
The character stories in Boogiepop Returns: VS Imaginator Part 2 were well received for drawing in the reader, and for making each character more "distinctive" and "recognizable" than in Boogiepop and Others. The troubled nature of the cast were applauded for creating engaging personalities, while psychological development in the story was praised for realizing the characters "in a manner few works manage", and for making the novel successful more than the supernatural elements. However, other reviewers criticized the character development for only seeming to advance the character of Asukai Jin.

Reviews have noted that since the story is told in a non-linear fashion, the plot won't entirely make sense until the end of the novel, although the narrative style makes the story easier to follow for the reader. Plot development was well received for being more succinct as a result of changing viewpoints between fewer characters than in Boogiepop Returns: VS Imaginator Part 1,

== Allusions/references from other works ==
The anime series Boogiepop Phantom also makes use of Paisley Park and elaborates upon its back story.

== Release details ==
- 1998, Japan, MediaWorks (ISBN 978-4-8402-0944-1), Pub date 25 August 1998, Paperback
- 2006, USA, Seven Seas Entertainment (ISBN 978-1-933164-23-6), Pub date 15 October 2006, Paperback
