= Boogiepop wa Warawanai =

Boogiepop wa Warawanai may refer to:

- Boogiepop and Others is a novel written by Kouhei Kadono
- Boogiepop and Others is a movie directed by Ryu Kaneda
- Boogiepop Phantom is an anime by Madhouse
- Boogiepop Doesn't Laugh is a manga by written by Kouhei Kadono and illustrated by Kouji Ogata
