= Kisugi =

Kisugi is a Japanese surname. Notable people with the surname include:

- Takao Kisugi, singer/composer
  - Etsuko Kisugi, Takao's sister and a lyricist

== Fictional characters ==
- Ai, Hitomi, and Rui Kisugi, the protagonists of Cat's Eye
- Hiroto Kisugi of Otogi-Jūshi Akazukin
- Makiko Kisugi (also known as Fear Ghoul) a doctor in Boogiepop at Dawn
- Teppei Kisugi of Captain Tsubasa
