= Boogiepop Dual: Losers' Circus =

Manga series by Masayuki Takano

- Boogiepop Dual
- Front cover of English volume 1

ブギーポップ・デュアル (Bugīpoppu Dyuaru)
- Genre: Speculative fiction
- Manga
- Written by: Kouhei Kadono
- Illustrated by: Masayuki Takano
- Published by: Mediaworks
- English publisher: NA: Seven Seas Entertainment
- Magazine: Dengeki Daioh
- Original run: April 2000 – December 2000
- Volumes: 2
- Related works
- Boogiepop

Boogiepop Dual (ブギーポップ・デュアル, Bugīpoppu Dyuaru), also known as Boogiepop Dual: Losers' Circus, is a manga by Masayuki Takano (author of Blood Alone), an offshoot of the Boogiepop series, a series of young adult novels by Kouhei Kadono. This work suggests that Toka Miyashita is not the only Boogiepop, and that there are many.

Takano closely recreates the atmosphere created by Kouji Ogata, who illustrated the original novels and manga, though it is not known whether Takano is employing his natural style or simply imitating Ogata in the interests of continuity. His plot structure and twists are sophisticated, reproducing the interweaving of past and present that characterize Kadono's original.

It is published in English by Seven Seas Entertainment, in French by Editions Ki-oon, and in German by Tokyopop.

== Plot summary ==
When a female student is abducted and on the verge of being raped, Boogiepop rushes onto the scene just in time to save the day. But Boogiepop's new male alter-ego, Akizuki Takaya, finds himself in the middle of a crime wave with ties going back to the previous owner of the Boogiepop mantle.

== Characters ==
- Motoka Igarashi (五十嵐初佳, Igarashi Motoka): A teacher and substitute nurse at a high school. Although she was once one of the Boogiepops, she currently lives a normal life, while giving assistance to Akizuki.
- Takaya Akizuki (秋月貴也, Akizuki Takaya): A high school student boy who must come to terms with being an incarnation of Boogiepop.
- Kano (加納, Kanou): An enemy from Igarashi's past who has the power to drive others mad with his words, and to avoid defeat if his opponent has a memory of losing or a thought that they might lose.
- Yuki Koga (古賀雪絵, Koga Yukie)
- Honjou (本上, Honjou): A teacher from when Igarashi was a student. He dies in the first explosion of the school's science lab.
- Yuka Kitamura (北村由佳, Kitamura Yuka)
