= Boogiepop Phantom =

Japanese anime television series

- Cover art for the 2012 R1 DVD box set

ブギーポップは笑わない Boogiepop Phantom (Bugīpoppu wa Warawanai)
- Genre: Dark fantasy; Psychological thriller; Urban fantasy
- Anime television series
- Directed by: Takashi Watanabe; Kenji Yasuda (assistant)
- Produced by: Masao Maruyama; Yasuo Ueda; Kazuya Furuse
- Written by: Sadayuki Murai
- Music by: The Art of Club Music For B.P.
- Studio: Madhouse
- Licensed by: Crunchyroll; AUS: Madman Anime; BI: Anime Limited
- Original network: TV Tokyo
- English network: NA: Anime Network; US: TechTV, Funimation Channel, Starz
- Original run: 5 January 2000 – 22 March 2000
- Episodes: 12
- Related works
- Boogiepop

Boogiepop Phantom (Japanese: ブギーポップは笑わない Boogiepop Phantom, Hepburn: Bugīpoppu wa Warawanai; lit. "Boogiepop Doesn't Laugh") is a Japanese anime television series animated by Madhouse, based on the Boogiepop light novel series by Kouhei Kadono. The series is directed by Takashi Watanabe, from a screenplay by Sadayuki Murai, with original character designs by the light novel's illustrator Kouji Ogata, and sound direction by Yota Tsuruoka. Chronologically, the story follows immediately after the events of the series's first volume, Boogiepop and Others, while also making references to the prequel sixth volume, Boogiepop at Dawn.

== Premise ==
The story takes place in an unnamed Japanese city, a month after a pillar of light appeared in the night sky and five years after a string of serial killings. Boogiepop Phantom follows an ensemble cast of characters, mostly high school students, who are witnesses to the incident and its consequences. At the time of the series, high school students have started to disappear again and the blame is placed on Boogiepop, an urban legend who is said to be the personification of Death.

== Structure ==
Each episode centers on different characters who sometimes have just a short involvement in the major events of the series. For this reason, many scenes are seen twice, from different perspectives, and some episodes are out of sequence, although there is a slow general time progression. An unusual visual style is employed wherein, for all but the last episode, a much reduced color palette is used in conjunction with a vignette effect. The sound design consists of synthesized avant-garde music carried by a leitmotif in the form of an active sonar pulse. Through the non-linear style of the series, the characters are used to develop the central themes of the series: Change, Escapism, Memory, and Relationships.

Boogiepop Phantom aired on TV Tokyo from January 5 to March 22, 2000. The series is licensed and distributed in North America and Europe by Right Stuf International.

== Summary ==
Five years before the events of Boogiepop Phantom, Nagi Kirima met and befriended Shinpei Kuroda, an undercover agent of the Towa organization, at the local prefecture's hospital. Nagi was hospitalized because she was dying as her body was evolving. Shinpei, upon learning the truth behind Nagi's sickness, betrayed the Towa organization and administered a stolen Towa drug to Nagi that saved her life. He was mortally wounded by Towa agents as he fled from the hospital, leaving the drug behind in the process. Touka Miyashita came across Shinpei (as the Towa Agent Scarecrow) and the psychological trauma from seeing the dying man (after being hit by More Murder) created her Boogiepop persona.

The Boogiepop at Dawn light novel describes how Dr Kisugi witnessed Nagi's remarkable recovery and, through experimentation on rats, learned of the drug's powers to grant superhuman abilities, before administering it to herself. The drug changed the doctor into a composite human, granting her the vast increase in physical and mental attributes shared with all composite humans and allowing her to sense the hormones that produce fear and develop a craving for them. At first terrorizing her patients and sampling their blood, she then murdered a number of strong-willed girls to consume the fear they produced at the moment of their death. Boogiepop Phantom shows how Dr Kisugi gave the drug to her patients, claiming it could heal them, and how it worsened their problems and resulted in their evolution. Kirima investigated the murders, and discovered Dr Kisugi was the serial killer. Nagi and Dr Kisugi confronted each other at the hospital, where The Fire Witch was initially overwhelmed by the doctor's power, but managed to kill her with Boogiepop's help.

The Boogiepop and Others novel tells of Manticore, an imperfect clone of the alien entity Echoes, created by the Towa Organization five years later. Escaping the laboratory, Manticore killed Minako Yurihara with the intention of assuming her form when it was found by Masami Saotome. Instead of killing Masami, Manticore struck a deal with him. Manticore (as Minako) and Masami experimented with production of Type S, a highly addictive drug that would enslave all its users to their will, while killing students for Manticore's consumption. Meanwhile, Echoes escaped from the Towa laboratory in chase of Manticore. The alien met up with Nagi Kirima, who was investigating the recent student disappearances.

Learning they were being pursued, Masami and Manticore set a trap for Echoes and Nagi. Events culminated one evening at Shinyo Academy, when Masami crippled Echoes with poison and killed Nagi, who did not expect Manticore to have a human ally. Manticore chased Echoes as he attempted to escape with Nagi's body, and beat him to the verge of death. Manticore and Masami were attacked by Boogiepop, who held Manticore in place while Echoes turned himself into light. The light pierced the sky and destroyed Manticore, with Masami committing suicide by flying into the pillar. Nagi was revived by Echoes before he left the planet.

Boogiepop Phantom is set one month later and revolves around the consequences of the pillar of light. Echoes' light inadvertently allowed the memories of that night to continue as holograms, giving rise to a mixed reality where past and present co-exist, and forced the evolution of the citizens, including those who were administered the Towa drug by Dr Kisugi. The series is concerned with these evolved individuals, how evolution affected their lives, and their disappearance after meeting Boogiepop Phantom. The Phantom explains it hid them below the city to save them, and that although their bodies no longer function, their nerves extend across the city so they will keep dreaming until the day the rest of humanity catches up to them.

== Characters ==
Boogiepop (ブギーポップ, Bugīpoppu) is the urban legend whispered of among the female students of Shinyo Academy. Reputed to be an "Angel of Death" with the appearance of a beautiful boy dressed all in black, who comes with a whistle to take girls away before they turn ugly. Few people know that Boogiepop actually exists, and is the dormant alter ego of Touka Miyashita who rises to the surface when enemies of the world appear. The reaper hides beneath its signature black cloak and hat, and acts in a mechanical and automatic fashion. Straight-faced and to the point, it speaks in an archaic manner, and seems fond of whistling the overture to Wagner's Die Meistersinger von Nürnberg.

Voiced by: Kaori Shimizu (Japanese); Debora Rabbai (English)

Boogiepop Phantom (ブギーポップ・ファントム, Bugīpoppu Fantomu) is an entity born in the electromagnetic field the moment Echoes' light appeared in the sky. Amongst the memories scattered by the light it could only find Boogiepop's attire, but not his face, and so chose the appearance of Minako Yurihara at random. He claims to be Boogiepop, but later renames himself Boogiepop Phantom out of respect for the original. He too confronts the enemies of the world, but has his own agenda in mind.

Voiced by: Mayumi Asano (Japanese); Simone Grant (English)

Kazuko Suema (末間和子, Suema Kazuko) was to be Dr. Kisugi's next victim, until Boogiepop and the Fire Witch put a stop to the killings. With the knowledge that her life had been in danger, she developed a fascination for criminal and abnormal psychology, and a desire to not let anything occur around her without her knowing. She desperately seeks the truth behind the unexplained happenings in the city, and meddles with forces best left untouched. Kazuko longs to be closer to Nagi Kirima, who seems to know the answers she seeks.

Voiced by: Kyo Nagasawa (Japanese); Anne Benkovitz (English)

Manaka Kisaragi (如月真名花, Kisaragi Manaka) is a highly evolved being with the ability to draw memories from her surroundings in the form of butterflies of light. She was given the Towa drug by Dr Kisugi as an unborn child, which caused her abilities to develop. The "devil's child", as she was known, was killed by her dying grandmother. Echoes' light brought Manaka back to life and caused accelerated aging. Her grandmother died soon after. Her insight into people's memories makes her aware of Echoes, whom she emulates.

Voiced by: Sanae Kobayashi (Japanese); Rachael Lillis (English)

Manticore Phantom (マンティコア・ファントム, Manteikoa Fantomu) is another product of Echoes' light, one who possesses the remnants of Manticore's consciousness and the visage of Masami Saotome. No longer the threat it once was, it now preys only on distressed, easy targets. Manticore Phantom seeks a way to sustain himself permanently when he learns that he will be gone once the electromagnetic field returns to its original state.

Voiced by: Jun Fukuyama (Japanese); Crispin Freeman (English)

Nagi Kirima (霧間凪, Kirima Nagi), the Fire Witch, has made few friends because she knows she is too dangerous for 'normal' people to associate with. She has a Messiah complex, and seeks to save the world from whatever may threaten it. Her father's death and her brief friendship with Shinpei Kuroda motivated Nagi to become a defender of justice. She is very strong both physically and mentally, and uses her abilities and inheritance in her self-appointed mission.

Voiced by: Yuu Asakawa (Japanese); Rachael Lillis (English)

Poom Poom (プームプーム, Pūmu Pūmu) is a phantom created by Manaka Kisaragi. Born from the memories of Mamoru Oikawa playing the Pied Piper in a school play, it evolved to take on qualities of Akane Kojima's fictional character of Poom Poom. By handing out red balloons to people who regret the direction their lives have taken, he takes a manifestation of their childhood hopes and dreams with him to Paisley Park, leaving only an empty shell behind.

Voiced by: Rakuto Tochihara (Japanese); Jessica Calvello (English)

Touka Miyashita (宮下藤花, Miyashita Tōka) possesses the appearance of an ordinary school girl at Shinyo Academy, but unknowingly has dissociative identity disorder. At the age of twelve, she witnessed the death of Shinpei Kuroda, and the resulting mental trauma gave birth to the alternate personality of Boogiepop. Whenever enemies of the world appear, Boogiepop takes over to do battle. Touka is not aware this is happening, as she deletes her memories of being Boogiepop, and carries all of Boogiepop's effects in a Spalding sports bag without realizing it.

Voiced by: Kaori Shimizu (Japanese), Debora Rabbai (English)

== Themes ==
Boogiepop Phantom is a story that primarily deals with change and how perceptions change as people grow older. The theme of change is represented not only by the ongoing struggle between the Towa organization and the evolved humans, but also by the way the look of the city is changing and through the growth of children into adults. Similar to the theme of change, the concept of moving on and not being stuck in the past is integral to the story as both Boogiepop and Boogiepop Phantom confront Manaka for what they perceive as keeping people stuck in the past. However, the series' view on change is presented ambiguously, as while the Towa organization seeks to prevent change in the world, it has world domination as its agenda. Boogiepop parallels this dualism as he encourages people to move forward with their lives while hunting down evolved humans thus preventing the possible transformation of society.

Retreat from reality and the consequences of escapism are important themes that play a major role in the series. The image of burning memories to forget them and so escape them is used throughout the latter half of the series to symbolize the theme of escapism. For the characters Misuzu and Yoji, their retreat from reality has devastating consequences: Misuzu enters a despairing insanity after being forced to realize the truth of her reality, while Yoji goes through a mental breakdown as his reality is no longer the fantasy he believed it to be. However, the question as to how people should live their lives goes unanswered by the series. Later on in the series, retreat from reality is revisited in the form of Poom Poom, who represents the ultimate escape from reality into childhood.

Relationships, and the tragedy of loss and misunderstanding inherent within them, are major themes in Boogiepop Phantom. The relationships that the characters Mamoru, Manaka, and Shizue have with their parents highlights the lack of support that children receive from parents who are otherwise busy, and the resulting disconnection between parents and children. With the actions of Poom Poom later in the series the theme of the Pied Piper is explored, as Poom Poom takes away the children because the parents have broken their promise. The message the show leaves the viewer however is positive, as both Manaka and Shizue reconcile with their mothers, and so the parent-child relationship can be saved by open communication and understanding. Another form of relationship is explored through the interaction between Moto and Manticore Phantom, where the physical surrender of Moto, who harbored feelings for Masami, associates the sexual relationship with death.

Boogiepop Phantom is also a series that is about memory and how memories help define who we are. For most of the characters, their memories of the past and background are crucially important in determining the direction their lives have taken.

== Production ==
Staff
Director	Takashi Watanabe Shigeyuki Suga (OP)
Screenplay	Sadayuki Murai Seishi Minakami Yasuyuki Nojiri
Original character design	Kouji Ogata
Character design	Shigeyuki Suga
Art director	Izumi Hoki Yuka Hirama
Original novel	Kouhei Kadono
Art design	Akihiro Hirasawa
Art supervision	Hiroshi Kato
Editing	Takeshi Seyama
Music director, sound director	Yota Tsuruoka
Producer	Kazuya Furuse Masao Nishimura Shigeyuki Suga (OP) Yasuo Ueda
Series composition	Sadayuki Murai
Series management	Keisuke Iwata
Sound design	Koji Kasamatsu

Boogiepop Phantom was conceived as an original story taking place after the events of the novels Boogiepop and Others and Boogiepop at Dawn. Sadayuki Murai developed the series concept and wrote the screenplay for both the anime and the live-action prequel Boogiepop and Others, having previously worked on the script for Perfect Blue, a feature film that explored many similar themes. The character designer and key animator Shigeyuki Suga had been a key animator for Serial Experiments Lain, a series with which Boogiepop Phantom is often compared. The reduced brightness and sepia color palette for most of the episodes, added to the anxieties and depressions of the characters, were designed to make the series play like psychological horror. Production staff later commented that the color scheme was more effective than they had originally intended, and were surprised by how bleak the series turned out.

A mixed media campaign was planned which would have had the live action prequel Boogiepop and Others released before the anime series, with the idea that people would watch the anime after seeing the movie, but the release of the film was delayed until after the series had neared the end of its original run, and so this strategy failed.

=== Artistic homages ===
Many homages are made to other works throughout Boogiepop Phantom. In particular, musical references are a characteristic trait of the Boogiepop novels, such as the character Echoes being an allusion to the Pink Floyd song of the same name, which itself is a possible allusion to 2001: A Space Odyssey with its themes of evolution and transcendence. Another possible allusion comes in the form of a sonar-ping sound effect utilized throughout the series. The intro to Echoes was devised from an experiment where the band tried to recreate that particular sound on a grand piano. Further, Towa agent Spooky Electric is a homage to a personality Prince claims to have that encouraged him to write The Black Album.

Mythology also plays a large part in Boogiepop Phantom. Two of the main protagonists are said to be Shinigami, death deities of Japanese folklore who can take on many forms. Kitsune are fox spirits of Japanese folklore, they possess magical powers that increase with age and are capable of assuming human form, with Boogiepop being described as a kitsune by Touka Miyashita's parents. The Manticore is named after the man-eater of Persian mythology.

=== Music ===
Yota Tsuruoka was the sound and music director for Boogiepop Phantom. The soundtrack for the series featured many artists and various styles, ranging from Gregorian to electronic. The opening theme song "Evening Shower" (夕立ち, Yuudachi), which was also used as the ending theme for the live action prequel Boogiepop and Others, was composed, arranged, and performed by Shikao Suga. Kyoko composed and performed the ending song "Future Century Secret Club" (未来世紀㊙クラブ, Mirai Seiki Maruhi Club). The Boogiepop Phantom soundtrack was published by AnimeTrax and released by The Right Stuf International as a two-disc CD on 30 April 2002. The songs "Evening Shower" and "Future Century Secret Club" were not included on the OST with the rest of the soundtrack, but were instead released separately by the artists. "Evening Shower" was published on 8 September 1999, prior to the initial airing of the series, on Shikao Suga's album Sweet, while Kyoko's "Future Century Secret Club" was initially released as a single of the same name on 9 February 2000, and later as part of an album titled Under The Silk Tree on 8 November 2000.

=== Releases ===
Originally broadcast on TV Tokyo from 5 January to 22 March 2000, Boogiepop Phantom was released in Japan on six DVDs subtitled "Evolution" 1-6 with two episodes per disc. The Right Stuf International confirmed on 6 January 2001 that they had licensed the property for release in North America and Europe while ADV Films would handle distribution. The English dub was recorded at Headline Sound Studios and received a 15 rating from the British Board of Film Classification.

The Right Stuf International first showed Boogiepop Phantom at various conventions and festivals such as Anime Expo and Montreal's Fantasia Film Festival, before being released in the United States as four bilingual DVDs containing 5.1 and 2.0 Dolby Stereo English and 2.0 Japanese with English subtitle soundtracks from 9 October 2001 until 12 February 2002. A boxed set containing all four "Evolution" DVDs was also released alongside "Evolution" 4. Extras on the discs included ADV previews, original Japanese promotions, producer and character notes, music videos for both the opening and ending songs, a special edit ending sequence, and English language commentaries for each episode. In 2003 The Right Stuf International released a limited edition boxed set containing all four DVDs, the 2-disc Boogiepop Phantom soundtrack and the Boogiepop: Music Inspired By Boogiepop and Others CD, as well as a limited edition Boogiepop Phantom card set and pencil boards, which were available exclusively from The Right Stuf International and Best Buy. Boogiepop Phantom was later released as a thinpak collection in 2006 that also came with the live action Boogiepop and Others.

The rights to broadcast the series were acquired by Anime Network, the first time a non-ADV title had been broadcast on that network, with broadcasting beginning from 1 July onwards. TechTV later announced that they would also broadcast the series with the premiere on 28 July 2003. Since then, the rights to broadcast the series have been acquired by Funimation Channel, and the series aired in early 2007.

== Reception ==
Boogiepop Phantom was a hit. The "spooky sepia puzzle" juggles an ensemble cast of characters, each with unique point of view, while revealing tidbits about the larger plot in a nonlinear fashion. Christopher Macdonald of Anime News Network gives special mention to Sadayuki Murai's skill as a screenwriter, for being able to keep the viewer engrossed as well as tying all elements and plot threads by the final episode. But the series' intricate nature is counterproductive. Its increasingly convoluted plot can discourage people from watching, and viewers not familiar with the Boogiepop universe will leave with "more questions than answers".

The reduced color palette was applauded for highlighting the sense of "mental disease" and "emotional malaise" that affected most of the characters, while the vignette effect allowed the viewer to observe inside the series rather than just watch it. Character designs have been criticized as "bland" but also "realistic" since none of the characters have "outrageous hair styles or colors". Reviews also recognized that "astute viewers may notice some rather interesting, although not very blatant, differences between the various characters", and that the "realistic" character designs created a degree of "normalcy" that was important to the story while also helping to draw in the viewer. The audio of the series has been described as "unique" and "incredible", going beyond what is expected of normal sound design and enhancing the "creepy" atmosphere of the show. Also noted was that the opening and ending songs don't appear to fit in well with the mood of the series. The English language track was not as well received as its Japanese counterpart, but still reviewed favorably. In particular, the performance of Jessica Calvello in the English dub was singled out and praised as being her best performance to date.

The Encyclopedia of Science Fiction described Boogiepop Phantom as a strong and notable anime, despite considering its non-linear narrative, overlapping storylines and frequent shifts in chronology overly complex. It praised the series' distinctive visual style, particularly its reduced colour palette and use of vignette effects, as well as its wide-ranging and evocative soundtrack, comparing its tone and narrative density favourably with Serial Experiments Lain. The encyclopedia also identified memory and the acceptance of change as central themes, noting the series' recurring distinction between remembering the past and becoming trapped by it.
