= Misaki =

Collective term for divine spirits in Japan

Misaki (Japanese: 御先, "misaki") are a collective term for spirit-like existences in Japan like gods, demons and spirits, among other supernatural entities. Their name comes from a kannushi's vanguard.

== Summary ==
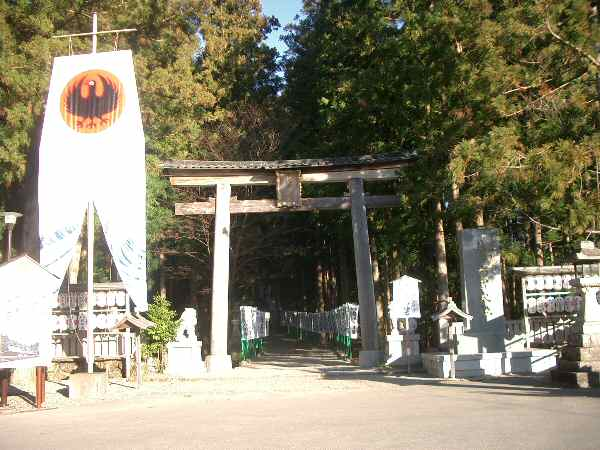
Flag of Yatagarasu at Kumano Hongū Taisha

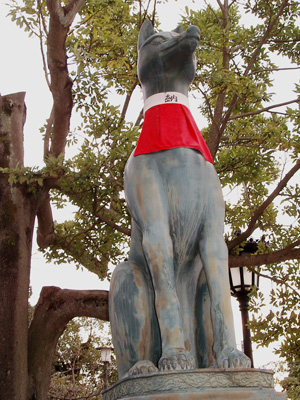
Kitsune of Fushimi Inari

Misaki are subordinate to the high-ranking divine spirits, and when divine spirits appear in the human realm and are said to be the small-scale divine spirits that appear as omens or to serve as their familiar spirits.

Misaki can be often seen as animals. The Yatagarasu that appears in Japanese mythology is one type of misaki, and when Yatagarasu guided Emperor Jimmu during Jimmu's eastern journey, this provides one example of the characteristics of misaki. Also, the kitsune within Inari Ōkami household are also one type of misaki, and like these Yatagarasu and kitsune, those that appear as heralding something important and the incarnation of gods are also considered misaki. In Iwaki, Fukushima Prefecture, on January 11, when they first hoe the field, they would say "kamisaki kamisaki" and call for the bird, and there is an event for praying "noutate" for the sake of the year's plentiful harvest.

== Spirit possession ==
In folk religion, especially in western Japan, misaki are connected to the faith in spirit possession, and like yukiaigami and hidarugami among others, the onryō of people who die of unexpected deaths and are not prayed for would frequently possess humans and cause calamities. Like stated previously, these misaki are small-scale spirits, but as small-scale as they are, the method of cursing is quite remarkable. Misaki are generally unable to be seen by the eyes, and are frequently encountered as a type of premonition of sicknesses and other things. When people walk on paths devoid of other people, it is said that sudden coldness or headaches are due to misaki. Since they are frequently said to float in the air, these illness are said to be because one has "come in contact with misaki-wind." In Hagi, Yamaguchi Prefecture, those who faint due to intracranial hemorrhage are also said to have "come in contact with misaki-wind." In the Chūgoku region, it is said that the spirit of humans who die violent deaths become misaki.

As a spirit possession, depending on the place they appear, they are also called "yama-misaki" (山ミサキ, "mountain misaki") (Yamaguchi Prefecture, Shikoku) or "kawa-misaki" (川ミサキ, "river misaki") (Shikoku), and it is said that a kawa-misaki becomes a yama-misaki once it enters a mountain. In the Miyoshi District, Tokushima Prefecture, it is said that when one senses fatigue at a river, it is because one has "become possessed by a kawa-misaki."

In Shikoku, these spirit possession are called hakaze, and it is said that humans and domestic animals who encounter them will become ill, and sometimes even die.

In the Kōchi Prefecture and the Fukuoka Prefecture, they are seen as a type of funayurei, and the spirits of people who die at sea are said to become misaki, and are said to possess fishing boats and inflict harm such as making the boat completely unable to move. This is commonly called "shichinin misaki," and it is said that they would go away when one takes the ashes left over after cooking and drops them off the back of the boat. In the Fukuoka Prefecture, they are also considered a type of funayurei.

Also, in western Japan, in the Tsugaru Region, Aomori Prefecture, when one is possessed by a misaki, one's body would shake without stop as if one's whole body was put in cold water, and like in Kōchi, by throwing the ashes from the firewood used in cooking off the ship, the misaki would be exorcised.
