= Jiken series =

Novel series by Kouhei Kadono

- Cover of 1st. volume of the Jiken series
- Genre: Fantasy, mystery
- Novel series
- Written by: Kouhei Kadono
- Published by: Kodansha
- Original run: June 2000 – present
- Volumes: 7

The Jiken series (事件シリーズ, Jiken shiriizu) are Japanese mystery novels by Kouhei Kadono. Kadono began his career writing light novels, but this series came from a mainstream publishing label, Kodansha Novels. In 2008 Del Rey Manga announced that they would be publishing the first novel in the series in English, but did not release any.

== Novels ==
The Case of the Dragon Slayer (殺竜事件, Satsuryū Jiken), June 2000, ISBN 4-06-182135-0
When a dragon is murdered, the main characters must travel the globe, trying to discover how such a thing was even possible.
Inside the Apocalypse Castle (紫骸城事件, Shigai Shiro Jiken), June 2001, ISBN 4-06-182184-9
During a sorcery tournament, sorcerers begin dying in unusual ways.
The Man in Pirate's Island (海賊島事件, Kaizoku-jima Jiken), December 2002, ISBN 4-06-182282-9
A princess is found encased in crystal, and the main suspect flees to an island ruled by pirates
Some Tragedies of No-Tears Land (禁涙境事件, Kinruikyō Jiken), January 2005, ISBN 4-06-182404-X
In the aftermath of destruction, investigators ponder links between unsolved mysteries from a town's past.
The Cruel Tale of Zankoku-go (残酷号事件, Zankokugō Jiken), March 2009, ISBN 978-4-06-182636-6
Injustice of Innocent Princess (無傷姫事件, Mukizuhime Jiken), January 2016, ISBN 978-4-06-299064-6
Beyond The Dragon's Skies
