= Boogiepop =

Light novel series

- The logo used for the English releases of Boogiepop products

ブギーポップシリーズ (Bugīpoppu shirīzu)
- Created by: Kouhei Kadono
- Light novel
- Written by: Kouhei Kadono
- Illustrated by: Kouji Ogata
- Published by: MediaWorks
- English publisher: NA: Seven Seas Entertainment
- Imprint: Dengeki Bunko
- Original run: February 25, 1998 – present
- Volumes: 26
- Anime television series

Boogiepop and Others
- Directed by: Shingo Natsume; Yōsuke Hatta (assistant)
- Produced by: Shou Tanaka; Takao Kiyose; Aya Iizuka; Ayuri Taguchi; Mitsuhiro Ogata
- Written by: Tomohiro Suzuki
- Music by: Kensuke Ushio
- Studio: Madhouse
- Licensed by: Crunchyroll
- Original network: AT-X, Tokyo MX, TVA, KBS, SUN, BS11
- Original run: January 4, 2019 – March 29, 2019
- Episodes: 18

The Boogiepop series (ブギーポップシリーズ, Bugīpoppu shirīzu) of Japanese light novels is written by Kouhei Kadono and illustrated by Kouji Ogata. It includes titles from different media, each connected by repeating characters and related plots. Presented in vignettes, each chapter presents the reader with only snapshots of what is happening, leaving them to find clues to understand the greater plot.

Boogiepop is best characterized as young adult fiction; by March 2000, two million copies of Kadono's Boogiepop light novels works were in print. By May 29, 2026, total sales exceed 5 million copies.

Kadono has published fourteen light novels and has serialized short stories in Dengeki hp, many of which have been published as a four-volume series about Pete Beat, a member of the Towa Organization. Two manga serials have been drawn for this series, which were serialized in Dengeki Daioh and Dengeki Animation.

In 2000, the anime series Boogiepop Phantom aired on Japanese television; a drama CD, featuring Kaori Shimizu, was released to promote this series. Later that year, the movie Boogiepop and Others was released. The anime and live action film were inspired by the original light novels and have also been released in English by The Right Stuf International, while Seven Seas Entertainment released four of the light novels and the manga.

== Synopsis ==
To face the "enemies of the world", the shinigami Boogiepop automatically rises to the surface. In Boogiepop's world, the Towa Organization, a shadowy group seeking to control humanity, managed to capture an alien organism who had taken the form of a highly evolved human. By studying him, the Towa Organization was able to create synthetic humans, people who have been artificially enhanced with special abilities. The mission of the Towa Organization and its agents is to find and kill MPLS, people who are more evolved than others and possess special abilities. However, Boogiepop will not let the Towa Organization get its way and he is not alone in his efforts.

The Boogiepop series is very much about the characters: their relationships, their pasts, their memories. This is especially true for how their pasts molded them into the people they are today. It can also be seen through scenes being presented from the perspective of different characters, and how the individual casts a different "feel" by how they relate to events. Another important theme is change. How the world changes and our different perceptions of this change, especially how one's perception of things changes as they grow up. Boogiepop Phantom is also highly metaphorical, with a character or an image representing much more than face value. It is also "a show about the inter-related nature of people's lives and the concept that they know of as time."

== Characters ==
Each Boogiepop title has its own cast of characters, and many of these characters will make appearances in more than one title, but there are only four central characters that are consistently at the center of the plot.

Boogiepop (ブギーポップ, Bugīpoppu)

The shinigami whispered of among the female students of Shinyo Academy, few people know that Boogiepop actually exists. Normally dormant, Boogiepop rises to the surface when enemies of the world appear. Boogiepop's appearance and voice are ambiguous: they seem both masculine and feminine at the same time. However, hidden beneath his signature black cloak and black, pipe-shaped hat, little is ever seen of him. Straight-faced and to the point, Boogiepop acts as mechanical as he claims to be. Boogiepop speaks in an archaic manner, and seems fond of whistling the prelude to Wagner's Die Meistersinger von Nürnberg. In the 2019 anime adaptation Boogiepop speaks with a particular drawl that gives their speech an ironic, condescending air.

Touka Miyashita (宮下藤花, Miyashita Tōka)

An ordinary, happy school girl at Shinyo Academy, Miyashita is in love with her boyfriend, Keiji Takeda, and close friends with Suema. Not particularly good at school, she does not stand out in any way. Unknown to most, she was hospitalized as a child, and this saw her life change, though even Miyashita herself does not seem to know the truth of what happened, and was simply told that she had been possessed by a kitsune. Unknowingly, when the world is in trouble, she carries a Spalding sports bag containing the effects of Boogiepop, her alternate personality. She has no recollection of her time as Boogiepop, and alters her memories to explain the blanks.

Nagi Kirima (霧間凪, Kirima Nagi)

Known as the Fire Witch to many, Kirima has made few friends due to the way she distances herself from others: she knows that she is too dangerous for 'normal' people to associate with. She has a messianic complex, and seeks to save the world from whatever may threaten it. As such, whenever there are unusual happenings within the city, Kirima can be found investigating what has happened. In the past, she had spent a period of time in hospital. A combination of the events from that period of her life, as well as the death of her father, the famous writer Kirima Seiichi, brought her to follow this path in life. Extremely gifted both physically and intellectually, she has the basic tools she needs to carry out her self-appointed mission.

Kazuko Suema (末間和子, Suema Kazuko)

As a result of a childhood trauma, Suema has developed an unusual fascination with criminal and abnormal psychology, as well as the desire to not let anything occur around her without her knowing. As a result of this, she desperately seeks the truth about the unexplained events happening in her city, and meddles with forces best left untouched. Good friends with Miyashita Touka, Suema appreciates how she so open and unconditionally accepting of her, and looks out for her friend. She seeks to be closer with Kirima Nagi, who seems to know the answers to the questions that have haunted her all these years. Despite her involvement in several incidents, she has yet to see Boogiepop in action.

== Media ==
The series currently consists of 26 light novels, 3 four volume light novel spin-off series, a live-action movie, two anime television series, four manga serials, audio CDs, and other books. An oddity of the Boogiepop titles is that they are almost always made of more than one title, and often there is a mix of English and Japanese titles.

=== Anime ===
Marking the 20th Anniversary of Kouhei Kadono's original novel debut, an anime television series adaptation was announced at the Dengeki Bunko 25th Anniversary & New Work Unveiling Stage. The series was directed by Shingo Natsume and written by Tomohiro Suzuki, with animation by Madhouse. Hidehiko Sawada provided the character designs, while Kensuke Ushio composed the series' music. The series aired from January 4 to March 29, 2019, and was broadcast on AT-X and other channels. The series ran for 18 episodes. Myth & Roid performed the series' opening theme song "shadowgraph," while Riko Azuna performed the series' ending song "Whiteout." Crunchyroll streams the series. Following Sony's acquisition of Crunchyroll, the dub was moved to Crunchyroll. Named Boogiepop and Others, the series adapts not only the titular novel, but also Boogiepop Returns: VS Imaginator, Boogiepop at Dawn, and Boogiepop Overdrive: The King of Distortion.

=== Internationalization ===
The Right Stuf International licensed Boogiepop Phantom for English release in 2001. They dubbed the series and have distributed it in the US in both VHS and DVD formats. The series is distributed in the UK by ADV Films and across Australia and New Zealand by Madman Entertainment. Boogiepop Phantom has also been localised and released in Argentina, Brazil, France, Italy, Spain and the Netherlands.

In 2004, The Right Stuf International acquired the film Boogiepop and Others. It has been released on DVD in Japanese with English subtitles, and is distributed in both the US and Europe, along with a director's commentary and behind the scenes interviews with the cast.

In 2005, Seven Seas Entertainment announced they had acquired the rights to publish the Boogiepop novels and manga in English. Before 2018, they released the first three novels and the sixth, as well as the Boogiepop Doesn't Laugh and the Boogiepop Dual manga. In 2019, Seven Seas Entertainment re-released the novels in an omnibus format, including the fourth and fifth novels in the series, Boogiepop in the Mirror and Boogiepop Overdrive, for the first time in English.

== Reception ==
=== Novels ===
Boogiepop and Others won the Fourth Dengeki Novel Prize in 1997 and was released in the Dengeki Book Collection in 1998 where it gained popularity. It is credited with popularizing light novels, as well as redefining young adult fiction in Japan. It was later adapted into a live action film by Ryu Kaneda, a two-volume manga by Kouji Ogata and served as the inspiration for a soundtrack composed by Yuki Kajiura. Boogiepop and Others also sets the scene for the anime Boogiepop Phantom, which has its backstory loosely based on the climax of the light novel. Having already gained a strong readership among high school and university age men, the release of Boogiepop Returns: VS Imaginator Part 1 was met with overwhelming support. By the time the Boogiepop and Others film was released, the Boogiepop series was a bestseller, with over two million copies in print.

The Boogiepop and Others novel received favorable reviews, though these have mostly focused on the translation, which has been cited as "a standard against which future Japanese novel translations are judged". It has also received praise for ripping "the rules of narrative wide open", especially for how it allows the characters to grow on the reader. Boogiepop Returns: VS Imaginator Part 1 continues receiving positive feedback for its easy-to-read style and excellent translation, as well as its use of atmosphere and characters. The main flaw, however, is the briefness of the title, which has clearly been used to set up the sequel.

=== Anime ===
The 2019 anime adaptation of Boogiepop received mostly positive reviews from Western journalists. Rose Bridges of Anime News Network reviewed the first four episodes, giving them an A− and writing, "If Boogiepop and Others can keep this up, it might be a truly stellar adaptation. I just hope it doesn't blaze so fast through these novels for us to keep up." Natasha H. of IGN wrote that while Boogiepop and Others doesn't have the "surreal and Lynchian horror" of Boogiepop Phantom, Boogiepop and Others "still holds its ground as a spooky and unnerving look into the emptiness of the human soul in contrast to society. Instead of going for a bleak first-person perspective, Boogiepop and Others presents alienation in from a third-person point of view. The result is an ongoing, chaotic, and jumbled narrative that leaves more questions than answers, until the very answer arrives, where things slowly are explained."

Brittany Vincent of Syfy wrote that "if you're in the mood to kick off a lengthy journey through a sometimes obtuse but wholly satisfying narrative that explores the supernatural, split personalities, and plenty of allegory, give Boogiepop and Others a chance. Don't expect it all to make perfect sense right away, but let it wash over you. You'll be glad that you did." Thrillist included the series on their list of the "Best Anime of 2019," writing that the series "could be best described as a slow-burn supernatural mystery thriller dotted with adrenaline-spiking sequences of horror, action, and suspense set against a backdrop of stunning metropolitan vistas."
