= Boogiepop and Others =

Japanese light novel, manga, and anime series

- Cover of the English release of Boogiepop and Others

ブギーポップは笑わない (Bugīpoppu wa Warawanai)
- Genre: Dark fantasy; Psychological horror; Supernatural
- Light novel
- Written by: Kouhei Kadono
- Illustrated by: Kouji Ogata
- Published by: MediaWorks
- English publisher: NA: Seven Seas Entertainment
- Imprint: Dengeki Bunko
- Published: February 25, 1998
- Manga

Boogiepop Doesn't Laugh
- Written by: Kouji Ogata
- Published by: Mediaworks
- English publisher: NA: Seven Seas Entertainment
- Magazine: Dengeki Daioh
- Original run: October 1999 – May 2001
- Volumes: 2
- Live-action film
- Directed by: Ryu Kaneda
- Produced by: Kazuo Kato; Tsuguo Hattori; Yasumasa Sone; Youmi Miyano
- Written by: Sadayuki Murai
- Music by: Yuki Kajiura
- Studio: Toei Company
- Licensed by: NA: Right Stuf International
- Released: March 11, 2000
- Runtime: 109 minutes

Boogiepop and Others (Japanese: ブギーポップは笑わない, Hepburn: Bugīpoppu wa Warawanai) is a Japanese light novel written by Kouhei Kadono and illustrated by Kouji Ogata. The first in the Boogiepop series, it was released in 1998 by MediaWorks and won the fourth Dengeki Game Novel Contest. A manga adaptation by Kouji Ogata began serialization in 1999. It is licensed in English by Seven Seas Entertainment under the title Boogiepop Doesn't Laugh.

The story takes place in an unnamed Japanese city, and follows five students at Shinyo Academy as they try to piece together the puzzle of a new drug and recent disappearances among the student populace. While the teachers believe them to only be runaways, the female students whisper among themselves about the urban legend Boogiepop, who is said to be a shinigami.

== Plot summary ==
When waiting for his girlfriend, Touka Miyashita, to arrive, Keiji Takeda sees a ragged-looking man stumbling through the town. A short man in a black cloak speaks with the other man after he collapses, then berates the crowd for not helping. When the police arrive, the two escape, but what shocked Takeda most of all was that the cloaked man has the face of his girlfriend. The following day, Miyashita acts as if nothing had happened the previous day. Takeda sought to speak with her after school, but instead spots the cloaked man. Confronting him, the stranger introduces himself as Boogiepop. Boogiepop claims to be a split personality, who has emerged to protect the world.

Boogiepop explains to Takeda that Miyashita is unaware of his existence, and would modify her memories to explain the blank periods. Boogiepop has appeared this time to face a man-eater hiding in the school. Through their discussions, the two come to accept each other, and become friends. In the end, Boogiepop appears to Takeda in Miyashita's school uniform, and explains that the crisis was over, so he would disappear. To the end, Takeda is sure that Boogiepop is merely Miyashita's repressed possibilities, rather than a monster-fighting hero.

Kazuko Suema has an unusual interest: criminal psychology. Despite this interest, she had little interest in the rumors the other girls talk about in class, about a shinigami named Boogiepop. While walking home with her friend, Kyoko Kinoshita, Kinoshita is attacked by Nagi Kirima, The Fire Witch. Kirima interrogates her about something, but stops when she realizes that she had only caught a 'normal' person; a drug-user. Suema confronts Kirima about this, but was told to let go of the events of five years ago – but Suema had never told anyone about that! Unable to let things happen without her being aware of them again, Suema searches for Kirima's house, and confronts her. However, Kirima reveals little about what she is doing, and only tells her that Boogiepop had saved her five years ago.

Masami Saotome joins a group date with Akiko Kusatsu. Late in the night, he drops a tablet into her drink; when she falls ill, he tells the others that he will get her home. Taking her to an abandoned building, he signals for Manticore to come; she turns the corpse into her loyal slave. Two months prior, Saotome had found the corpse of Yurihara at school, before himself being attacked by Manticore. Rather than panic or fight back, he told Manticore it would be better off leaving him alive and taking the form of Yurihara. In time, the two were deeply in love with each other, as they hatched their plan to conquer the world. As their experiments in controlling people begin to fail, and Nagi Kirima seems to be investigating too close, the relationship between Saotome and Manticore strains, until Naoko Kamikishiro came upon them, calling for Echoes. Manticore kills Kamikishiro, but for Saotome, this was the missing link: he has a plan to solve their problems.

Akio Kimura receives a letter telling him that Naoko Kamikishiro was dead. Two years ago, when they were in High School, he met Kamikishiro when she was confessing her love to Shirou Tanaka. Returning to his hometown to investigate the origin of this letter, Kimura runs into Touka Miyashita. Miyashita tells him that he should get over the disappearance of Kamikishiro, but Kimura tells her that an alien had taken Kamikishiro into space with him. Kamikishiro had told Kimura that she had met an alien named Echoes, who had been sent to evaluate humanity, but he had been cloned. His clone was now somewhere in their town, and he was looking to kill it before it killed the humans. As Kimura and Miyashita go their separate ways, Miyashita – but at the same time not Miyashita – tells him that Kamikishiro had "done her duty".

Shirou Tanaka approaches Kei Niitoki about the disappearance of Naoko Kamikishiro. Masami Saotome suggests they ask Nagi Kirima, a friend of Kamikishiro. Unable to find her around the school, Saotome suggests summoning her over the school's PA. Recognising a trap, Kirima cut the lights to the PA room, and knocked out the three students with a stun gun. When they came to, they were presented to Echoes, who indicated that they were normal humans. After they were released by Echoes, Saotome stabbed him in the throat with a poison-filled mechanical pencil before Manticore attacked. Saotome then slashed Kirima's throat, killing her.

By the time Niitoki comprehended the situation, Echoes was being defeated by Manticore. However, he points to the sky, and transforms into light. Echoes directs the beam of light towards Manticore, but Saotome intervenes; he just barely saves her, but was killed instead. Hoping to take this chance to escape, Niitoki runs, but Manticore pursues. Hearing someone whistling Die Meistersinger von Nürnberg, she heads towards the sound. Niitoki trips, but Manticore becomes trapped in a wire. Niitoki's savior has the face of Touka Miyashita, but claims to be Boogiepop. While Manticore is trapped, Boogiepop calls for Tanaka to shoot it with an arrow; an arrow to the head finishes the creature. Finally, Kirima rises from the dead, apparently resurrected by Echoes as he left.

== Characters ==
Boogiepop (ブギーポップ, Bugīpoppu)
The shinigami whispered of among the female students of Shinyo Academy, but is his origin truly of the supernatural, or is he merely an alternate personality of his 'host', Touka Miyashita?
Echoes (エコーズ, Ekōzu)
A being who took upon the form of the final stage of human evolution. The Towa Organisation used Echoes to create their synthetic humans, and created a clone of him: Manticore. When Manticore escapes from the Towa Organisation, Echoes sets off to kill it.
Naoko Kamikishiro (紙木城直子, Kamikishiro Naoko)
A third-year student at Shinyo Academy, Kamikishiro is going out with Shirou Tanaka. She coincidentally meets Echoes, and is compelled to assist him, only to find they shared a telepathic link.
Akio Kimura (木村明雄, Kimura Akio)
A second-year student at Shinyo Academy, Kimura is in love with Naoko Kamikishiro.
Nagi Kirima (霧間凪, Kirima Nagi)
Also known as The Fire Witch. A second-year student at Shinyo Academy, Kirima spends more time investigating the mysterious happenings than she does in class.
Manticore (マンティコア, Manteikoa)
A clone of Echoes made by the Towa Organisation, Manticore escaped from them, and sought to hide itself in Shinyo Academy by taking the form of Minako Yurihara. A man-eater, Manticore is named after the creature of Persian mythology.
Touka Miyashita (宮下藤花, Miyashita Tōka)
A second-year student at Shinyo Academy, Miyashita going out with Keiji Takeda, and believes she is living an ordinary high school girl. However, inside her Spalding sportsbag are the clothes and equipment of her other identity, the shinigami Boogiepop.
Kei Niitoki (新刻敬, Niitoki Kei)
A second-year student at Shinyo Academy and the President of the Discipline Committee, Niitoki is relied upon and trusted by her fellow students, despite her small stature.
Masami Saotome (早乙女正美,, Saotome Masami)
A first-year student at Shinyo Academy, Saotome has a strange attraction to strong, dangerous women. Though rejected by Nagi Kirima, he turned his affection to Manticore, and began helping her to hide into human society, and use her power to their best gain.
Kazuko Suema (末真和子, Suema Kazuko)
A second-year student at Shinyo Academy, Suema has a reputation among the other students due to her unusual knowledge of criminal psychology.
Keiji Takeda (竹田啓司,, Takeda Keiji)
A third-year student at Shinyo Academy, Takeda thought he knew everything about his girlfriend, Touka Miyashita, until he met Boogiepop.
Shiro Tanaka (田中志郎, Tanaka Shirō)
A first-year student at Shinyo Academy, and the rising star of the Archery Club, Tanaka is going out with Naoko Kamikishiro.

== Film adaptation ==
Boogiepop and Others was adapted into a live-action film with the same name, which was released in Japan on March 11, 2000. The film was directed by Ryu Kaneda, and starred Sayaka Yoshino as Miyashita/Boogiepop. MediaWorks, Hakuhodo and Toei Video were also involved in the production of the film. The director, Kaneda, said he did not wish to simply depict modern children as they were. "Here, the characters that appear on screen embrace all of their loneliness, and that's something that doesn't change in any era." He continues, "I thought perhaps I should turn it into the message that, no matter what, we must express our 'sense of isolation from deep inside that won't let us smile.'" He encouraged the actors to adapt their characters, and allowed ad-libbing.

Asumi Miwa's role as Naoko Kamikishiro was considered the most demanding of all. Her scenes were shot in quick succession, so she finished before the rest of the cast. Miwa considered the scene where she meets Echoes for the first time to be the most demanding of all. Sayaka Yoshino gave up her summer break to appear in the film, and had to perform in Boogiepop's "sauna suit" in days reaching 35 °C (95 °F). With the actors performing entire days in full sun, cool packs had to be brought in to keep them going. Maya Kurosu spend two months in training for her role as Kirima Nagi, so that she could perform in the action scenes.

The climax, filmed from September 15, 1999 (the 25th day of filming), was the greatest challenge. 50 shots had to be taken in 2 days, all at night. A Typhoon reached the Kantō Metropolitan area on that day, but against the forecasts it cleared up before they were due to begin filming. At 6pm, they were ready to begin.

=== Anime ===
There have been two anime adaptations (see Boogiepop (anime)).

Episodes 1 to 3 of 2019 anime Boogiepop and Others adapt the novel in an abridged form with a present-day setting. The most notable omission is the full removal of Akio Kimura from the story.

=== Music ===
The soundtrack for Boogiepop and Others, titled Music Album Inspired by Boogiepop and Others, was composed and arranged by Yuki Kajiura and featured a wide range of musical styles including jazz, pop, and piano. Each of the original songs composed represented a theme from the movie, such as the song "Forget-me-not" thematically representing Naoko Kamikishiro and Kimura Akio. A Boogiepop version of the classical overture to Wagner's "Die Meistersinger von Nürnberg" was included on the album as an additional bonus track, arranged by Yoshihisa Hirano and conducted by Orie Suzuki. The soundtrack was originally released in Japan by Media Factory on 25 March 2000. It was published in North America by AnimeTrax and released by Right Stuf International as a single disc CD on 30 April 2002.

== Themes ==
Issues relating to growing up and change are central to the Boogiepop series.

The narrative style demonstrates how different people observe different truths.

== Critical reception ==
=== Novels ===
The Boogiepop and Others novel won the fourth Dengeki Game Novel Contest in 1997. The novels English release has received favorable reviews, though these have mostly focused on the translation, which has been cited as "a standard against which future Japanese novel translations are judged". It has also received praise for ripping "the rules of narrative wide open", especially for how it allows the characters to grow on the reader.

=== Film ===
The English release of the live-action film met mixed reception. Whilst the characters and plot were well received, the special effects and costumes have been described as "campy", but "par for the course of something of this level and budget". It has been primarily recommended to fans of Boogiepop Phantom, so as to gain "a complete understanding of the Boogiepop events".

=== Manga ===
The Boogiepop Doesn't Laugh manga received generally favorable reviews, particularly for capturing some of the more complicated scenes better than the original light novel. This makes the plot easier to follow, and captures the urgency of the climactic battle. However, it has been noted that breaking the complicated plot of Boogiepop and Others into a multi-volume manga results in individually weak volumes. As with Boogiepop Phantom, the character designs have been noted as "lookalike and nondescript", which can make some of the events difficult to follow. The art has also been described as "washed out and dull".

=== Anime ===
The Encyclopedia of Science Fiction considered Boogiepop and Others stylistically less distinctive than the earlier Boogiepop Phantom, noting that it softened the characterization of both Boogiepop, who is portrayed as less distant and more talkative, and Nagi, who appears less imposing. Of the series' four story arcs, the encyclopedia regarded "Boogiepop and Others" and "Boogiepop at Dawn" as the strongest, while criticizing the other two for weaker plotting and less convincing character interactions.
