= Shichinin misaki =

The Shichinin misaki (七人ミサキ or 七人みさき), which means "7-person misaki," are a group of ghosts first known in Kōchi Prefecture, told about in the Shikoku and Chūgoku regions.

== Summary ==
They are ghosts of humans who died from calamities and accidents, especially drowning at sea. As according to its name, they normally, together as a group of seven, appear mainly near water, like seas and rivers. Humans who encounter the shichinin misaki experience a high fever, and die. By possessing and killing one person, one of the spirits of the shichinin misaki are able to go to peace, and in its place, the one who was possessed and killed becomes one of the shichinin misaki. For this reason, the shichinin misaki are always a group of seven, never increasing nor decreasing.

There are several accompanying legends about the progenitor of this spirit, but among the most well-known is the ballad of the vengeful spirit of the Sengoku military commander of Tosa Province (now Kōchi Prefecture), Kira Chikazane, told about in classics like the "Rouho Kidan" (老圃奇談) and the "Shin'i Kaii Kidan" (神威怪異奇談). During the Azuchi–Momoyama period, after the death of the Chōsokabe Nobuchika, the eldest son of Kira Chikazane's uncle Chōsokabe Motochika, since he opposed Motochika in supporting Chōsokabe Morichika as the successor, he was ordered to commit seppuku. At that time, several vassals also followed suicide (and thus 7 people in total), but afterwards, various strange events started happening at their graves, and the vengeful spirits of Chikazane and the rest were feared as the shichinin misaki. Motochika, who heard of this, held a memorial for them, but there was no effect, and in order to pacify the vengeful spirits, Kizuka Myoujin (木塚明神) was deified at the gravesite of Nishibun Village, Masui (now Kōchi). This is the currently existing Kira Shrine. Also, according to the "Doyouinken Kidan" (土陽陰見奇談) and the "Shin'i Kaii Kidan," Hieyama Chikaoki, who also opposed Motochika along with Chikazane, was also made to commit seppuku, and all 6 of his wife and children were also given the death penalty, and it is said that the total of 7 people became the Hie Village shichinin misaki.

In Mihara, Hiroshima Prefecture, there was a mound called "Kyouzuka" (経塚, "sutra mound" or 狂塚, "insanity mound"), where there were once 7 brutal mountain priests, and when the people they tormented worked together to kill them, their vengeful spirits became the shichinin misaki, and it is said that this mound was made in order to pacify that curse. Other than that, it is also said that these spirits are the fleeing defeated Taira clan soldiers who fell and died in a boar trap, 7 female pilgrims who were thrown into the ocean, the soldiers who lost their lives in Tenshō 16 (1588) from the Chōsokabe Motochika inheritance controversy, the spies of Iyoutsu no Miya who died in the Eiroku period, and so on. In Touyama, Yamaguchi Prefecture (now Shūnan), it is said that shichinin misai appearing as monks, while ringing bells, would walk down paths at high speed, and kidnap female children. For that reason, girls were warned not go outside after it has gotten dark, but in times when it was necessary to go outside, it is said that it is possible to flee from the shichinin misaki by going about while hiding one's thumb in one's hand.

== Shibuya shichinin misaki ==
The shibuya shichinin misaki (渋谷七人ミサキ) is an urban legend told about in the later half of the 1990s.

In the Shibuya area in Tokyo, seven female high school students met death one after another. It is said it is because these students who performed compensated dating got pregnant and aborted their children, and the children's vengeful spirits became the shichinin misaki (or, the vengeful spirits of the children resurrected the shichinin misaki of the above legend), and were taking their revenge on their mothers, who were the female high school students.

== See also ==
- Shichinin dōgyō
