= Kouhei Kadono =

Japanese author (born 1968)

- Born: December 12, 1968 (age 57); Chiba, Japan
- Education: Hosei University
- Writing career
- Genres: Science fiction, fantasy, mystery
- Notable work: Boogiepop series

Kouhei Kadono (上遠野 浩平, Kadono Kōhei; born December 12, 1968) is a Japanese author, best known for the Boogiepop series which has received multiple manga adaptations, a live action film, and two television anime.

== Biography ==
Born on December 12, 1968, Kadono graduated from Hosei University.

In 1998, his light novel Boogiepop and Others won the Fourth Dengeki Novel Prize and was later adapted into a manga that was illustrated by Kouji Ogata. An anime spin-off of the Boogiepop series, Boogiepop Phantom, aired in 2000 animated by Madhouse and an anime adaptation of the series was released in 2019 by the same studio.

== Works ==
=== Boogiepop series ===
Boogiepop Novels

- Boogiepop and Others
- Boogiepop Returns: VS Imaginator Part 1
- Boogiepop Returns: VS Imaginator Part 2
- Boogiepop in the Mirror: Pandora
- Boogiepop Overdrive: The King of Distortion
- Boogiepop at Dawn
- Boogiepop Missing: Peppermint Wizard
- Boogiepop Countdown Embryo: Erosion
- Boogiepop Wicked Embryo: Eruption
- Boogiepop Paradox: Heartless Red
- Boogiepop Unbalance: Holy & Ghost
- Boogiepop Stacatto: Welcome to Jinx Shop
- Boogiepop Bounding: Lost Moebius
- Boogiepop Intolerance: The Ark of Orpheus
- Boogiepop Question: The Silent Pyramid
- Boogiepop Darkly: The Scat Singing Cat
- Boogiepop Unknown: Into The Lunar Rainbow
- Boogiepop Within: Paradigm Rust
- Boogiepop Changeling: Stalking in Decadent Black
- Boogiepop Antithesis: Revolt of Alternative Ego
- Boogiepop Beautiful: The Kingcraft of Panic-Cute
- Boogie Pop Almighty: When Dizzy Thinks of Lizzy

Beat's Discipline

- Beat's Discipline Side 1[Exile]
- Beat's Discipline Side 2[Fracture]
- Beat's Discipline Side 3[Providence]
- Beat's Discipline Side 4[Indiscipline]

Repent Walpurgis

- Repent Walpurgis Fire 1[Warning Witch]
- Repent Walpurgis Fire 2[Spitting Witch]
- Repent Walpurgis Fire 3[Dozing Witch]
- Repent Walpurgis Fire 4[freezing witch]

The Emperoider

- The Emperoider Spin 1[Wormy Empire]
- The Emperoider Spin 2[Gravelly Empire]
- The Emperoider Spin 3[Haunted Empire]
- The Emperoider Spin 4[Fallen Empire]

Short Stories

- Metal Guru
- London Calling
- My Death Waits
- Boogiepop Poplife
- Chariot Choogle
- Angel Volume

=== Tokuma Dual ===
Night Watch Trilogy

- The Night Watch into the Night Yawn
- The Night Watch under The Cold Moon (VS Imaginator Part IV)
- The Night Watch against the Star-Crossed Star

Novel 21 Shonen no Jikan (anthology)

- Controversy about Iron Mask (short story)

=== Kodansha ===
Jiken series

- A Case of Dragonslayer
- Inside the Apocalypse Castle
- The Man in Pirate's Island
- Some Tragedies of No-Tear Land
- The cruel tale of ZANKOKU-GO
- Injustice of innocent princess
- Beyond The Dragon's Skies

Faust

- Outlandos d'amour
- Jagtiger (Porsche Laufwerk
- When Hornet Says Leb'wohl

Mephisto

- Dragonfly in the Sky with Gold
- Eyes of Guignol, or Outside the Castle
- A Spoon of Jackpot
- Masque of Veiled Man
- Snows in Dragon's Teeth

Mystery Land

- No Oxygen, Not To Be Mirrored (ISBN 978-4-06-270582-0)

=== Shizuru-san series ===
==== The Eccentric Dead in White Sickroom ====
The Eccentric Dead in White Sickroom (しずるさんと偏屈な死者たち, Shizurusan to Henkutsuna Shishatachi) is the first novel in the Shizurusan series written by Kadono and illustrated by Kaya Kuramoto. It tells four stories of two girls and one short story about a fictional character created by the girls.

All of Kadono's works are linked together to a greater or lesser degree. The Shizuru-san series is particularly connected with Boogiepop Unbalance: Holy & Ghost.

===== Plot summary =====
""There is no mysterious mystery but "deception" there – ."" The beauty girl who lives a life bedridden in a hospital challenges mysterious incidents which spread over the world by the cool pupil and sharp insight with a partner.

===== Characters =====
"Yō-chan" (よーちゃん, Yō-chan) (Real-name is unknown.)
A familiar face of the hospital in which Shizuru-san is, and her best friend. She comes for Shizuru frequently to see and talk to because she herself is pleasant.
Shizuru-san (しずるさん, Shizuru-san)
A beauty attached and interested severely in cruel incidents which Yo wants to avert her eyes and the intricately complicated mystery. The incidents in which she got interested are solved one after another only by her reading data, without her moving from the hospital. The incident she indicates interest is unsolvable by any means, if it is thought using ordinary common sense. During guessing she is indifferent to Yo's feeling, although she is usually so gentle that she wants Yo not to have a decadent idea. She always remains calm. She never utters loud voice and does not talk rapidly.
Chikuta (チクタ)
Sewing-basis which Yo was loving once. Yo and Shizuru make him into a hero and collaborate with each other in telling one story.

==== Other works in series ====
- The Bottomless Closed-Rooms in the Limited World
- The Silent Princess in the Unprincipled Tales
- The Cavalier Bleeds for the Blood

=== Soul Drop series ===
- Spectral Speculation of Soul-Drop
- Phantasm Phenomenon of Memoria-Noise
- Labyrinthine Linkage of Maze-Prison
- The Deprived Proof of Topolo-Shadow
- The Screened Script of Crypt-Mask
- Infinity Inference of Out-Gap
- Remote Thinking of Cogito-Pinocchio

=== Other works ===
- The Dance with Pluto and Beast
- Clockwork Serpents
- Questions & Answers of Me & Devil in 100
- Like Toy Soldiers
- Zero Trillion in Pangaea
- JoJo's Bizarre Adventure: Purple Smoke Distortion
- JoJo's Bizarre Adventure: Shining Diamond's Demonic Heartbreak
