= Criminal psychology =

Study of the thoughts, intentions, and behavior of criminals

Criminal psychology is the empirical study of criminal behavior and its social impact. It is a subfield of criminology, forensic psychology, and applied psychology. The field aims to understand why individuals commit crimes and how psychological principles can be used to prevent criminal behavior and assist the justice system. Criminal psychology is important because it helps explain not only what crimes are committed, but also why offenders may behave the way they do.

Criminal psychologists have many roles within legal courts, including being called upon as expert witnesses and performing psychological assessments on victims and those who have engaged in criminal behavior. They may also assist law enforcement agencies during investigations by offering behavioral insights on suspects. Several definitions are used for criminal behavior, including behavior punishable by public law, behavior considered immoral, behavior violating social norms or traditions, or acts causing severe psychological harm. Criminal behavior is often considered antisocial in nature. Psychologists also help with crime prevention and study the different types of programs that are effective to prevent recidivism, as well as understanding the relationship between mental health and criminal behavior.

== Distinction from Forensic Psychology and Criminology ==
Unlike Forensic Psychology and Criminology, Criminal Psychology is not consistently recognized as a distinct academic or professional discipline. Because of this, the scope of Criminal Psychology and the work of Criminal Psychologist can often overlap with that of Forensic Psychology and Criminology. Criminal Psychology can be distinguished as understanding motivations of criminal behavior through the lens of mental health conditions and motivations. One of the largest roles of Criminal Psychologists is contributing to research, although a criminal psychologist can take on many other roles due to the overlapping subject matter.

Forensic Psychology is the broader study and application of psychological knowledge within legal settings, including matters related to mental health and the justice system. It is also a recognized psychological specialty by the APA. Forensic Psychologist may take on roles such as working with victims or criminals, assisting with or testifying in a trail, working in correctional facilities or rehabilitation centers, working alongside law enforcement, teaching or working in educational settings, or working within the judicial system to inform policy. Forensic Psychologist use their knowledge and understanding of Criminal Psychology to help inform their decisions.

Criminology is an interdisciplinary field of study that examines crime, the individuals and factors associated with criminal behavior, and societies responses to crime through the study of legal, social, psychological, and institutional influences. Similar to Forensic Psychology, Criminology is generally considered a distinct area of study. While aspects of Criminology focus on criminal behavior due to mental health and individual motivations, its overall scope is much broader, as it also examines social conditions, legal systems, and institutional influences that contribute to crime and society's response to it. A Criminologist is more likely to positions conducting research and informing legal systems.

== History ==
Early research by individuals like Hugo Münsterberg and Martin Luther King in the late 19th and early 20th century is where criminal psychology got its start. These early theories attempted to explain criminal behavior through biological and psychological characteristics. Modern approaches were made possible by Lombroso's work, even though his arguments about the correlation between criminality and physical characteristics have been significantly debunked. Later advancements focused on psychological theories of crime, including cognitive-behavioral models and social learning theory (Bartol & Bartol, 2021). Criminal psychology started the late 18th century. The first seeds of forensic psychology were planted in 1879 when Wilhelm Wundt, often referred to as the father of psychology, founded his first lab in Germany. Before criminal psychology, there was a conflict in criminal law between medical experts and court judges on determining how to proceed with a majority of cases which specialized the development of a specialized field for individual investigations and assessments of suspects. It is generally accepted that criminal psychology was a predecessor to the broader field of criminology, which includes other fields such as criminal anthropology which studies more systemic aspects of crime as opposed to individual suspects and court cases.Overtime, criminal psychology became more scientific and less focused on unsupported physical theories. Modern researchers now study how the environment, personality, trauma, and learned behavior can influence criminal actions.

== Profiling ==
Criminal profiling, also known as offender profiling, is a form of criminal investigation, linking an offender's actions at the crime scene to possible characteristics. This is a practice that lies between the professions of criminology, forensic science and behavioral science. Most commonly used for homicide and sexual cases, criminal profiling helps law enforcement investigators narrow down and prioritize a pool of suspects. Part of a sub-field of forensic psychology called investigative psychology, criminal profiling has advanced substantially in methodology and grown in popularity since its conception in the late 1800s.

Profiling can be helpful when investigators have limited leads and need to narrow down possible suspects. It is most effective when combined with forensic evidence, interviews, and other investigative methods.

However, there is a substantial lack of empirical research and effectiveness evaluations validating the practice of criminal profiling. Due to the lack of empirical research, it is important that criminal profiling is used as a tool in investigative cases. Cases should not depend on solely the profile but as well as traditional techniques as well.

Criminal/offender profiling is a process now known in the Federal Bureau of Investigation (FBI) as criminal investigative analysis. (see also: FBI method of profiling) Profilers, or criminal investigative analysts, are trained and experienced law enforcement officers who study every behavioral aspect and detail of an unsolved violent crime scene, in which a certain amount of psychopathology has been left at the scene. The characteristics of a good profiler are discussed. Five behavioral characteristics that can be gleaned from the crime scene are described:

1. amount of premeditation,
2. degree of control used by the offender,
3. escalation of emotion at the scene,
4. risk level of both the offender and victim, and
5. appearance of the crime scene (disorganized versus organized).

The process of interpreting the behavior observed at a crime scene is briefly discussed.

In a 2017 article by Pew Research Center, it was found that federal and state prisons in the United States held 475,900 inmates who were African American and 436,500 who were white. Similar historical data supports the substantially higher incarceration of African American people. This is in contrast with census data which has placed the percentage of African American people at about 12% of the US population. Negative ethnic stereotypes contribute to this disproportionate incarceration; it has served as a justification for the unofficial policies and practices of racial profiling by criminal justice practitioners.

The cultural, environmental and traditional concepts of communities play a major role in individual psychology, providing profilers with a potential basis for behavioral patterns learned by offenders during their upbringing. They also evaluate the safety of prisons for those incarcerated, as some individuals may be predisposed to recidivism if the prisoners' mental health is not adequately addressed. There are several individual factors contributing to developing a criminal profile that both meets legal requirements and treats individuals humanely.

== Criminal Psychology in Practice ==
In practical settings, criminal psychologists are involved in criminal profiling, where behavioral patterns and psychological traits are used to help identify suspects. They also perform court-ordered psychological evaluations to determine competency, assess risk, and offer insights into an offender's mental state at the time of a crime. They may also assist correctional facilities by evaluating inmates and recommending appropriate treatment or rehabilitation programs. These evaluations can influence sentencing and treatment recommendations.

== Crime Prevention ==
There are several programs that attempt to help teens and young adults that are having disciplinary problems and involvement with the law. These programs include Scared Straight, Boot Camps, and rehabilitation. Research shows that these programs are ineffective or that they may even increase the likelihood of participants reoffending. In order for these interventions to be effective the person needs to voluntarily accept treatment. Research has shown that the most effective methods for preventing recidivism are Cognitive Behavior Therapy (CBT) or rehabilitation programs that teach skills necessary to continue living after the duration of the programs. It is one of the most widely used methods, focusing on identifying and changing the thought patterns that lead to criminal behavior. CBT helps offenders understand the consequences of their actions and learn alternative coping strategies. Studies have shown that CBT can significantly reduce the likelihood of reoffending, particularly in young offenders. There are several therapies that are used to help criminals:

- Intensive Multimodal Cognitive Therapy
- Anger Management
- Motivational Interviewing
- Dialectical Behavior Therapy
- Schema Modal Therapy
- Functional Family Therapy
- Group-Based Cognitive Behavioral Therapy
- Mentorship Programs
- Multidimensional Family Therapy

Another approach, psychodynamic therapy, draws from Freud's psychoanalytic theory and seeks to uncover unconscious conflicts that may lead to criminal behavior. While psychodynamic therapy is less commonly used today, it can still provide valuable insights into deep-rooted psychological issues that may contribute to criminal tendencies. Additionally, anger management programs and social skills training have been implemented in various correctional settings, aiming to help offenders deal with emotions in a constructive way. These therapies are especially relevant for individuals who commit crimes due to impulse control issues or aggression.

== Different types of mental disorders within the system ==
The criminal justice system has a wide variety of people that are incarcerated, some of these people have mental illness or disabilities. Some people that are in the system come from lower socioeconomic status and have childhood trauma that later results in mental illness, such as Post Traumatic Stress Disorder (PTSD), and this increases the likelihood of them being involved with the law at a young age.

Fetal Alcohol Syndrome is caused by a pregnant mother consuming alcohol. This can cause the individual to have issues with decision-making, substance abuse, and the ability to function. They are more likely to commit crimes around the age of 12, which can include drug offenses, shoplifting, and sex crimes.

Some people with Autism Spectrum Disorder (ASD) are incarcerated, but not more than a non-autistic person. There is a difference though between gender and age. Male teenagers are more likely to have altercations with the law. When the altercations do occur they most often include crime related to stalking, drugs, theft/property damage. Ethnic lower-class women are more likely to be underdiagnosed. The increase chance of criminal behavior may be traced back to unmet needs not known.

Post Traumatic Stress Disorder (PTSD) is another mental illness that inmates may have, and this can be co-morbid with other disorders, such as depression, anxiety, substance use and personality disorders. The most common co-morbid disorders among criminals is depression and substance use disorder. The inmates with PTSD are most likely to be violent with other inmates and commit more violent crimes.

Attention-Deficit Hyperactivity Disorder (ADHD) is another disorder that criminals are likely to have. This disorder can also be co-morbid with disorders like conduct disorder and later on can develop into antisocial personality disorder. People with ADHD often commit crimes such as assault, sex crimes, homicide, and drug charges. After being released from jail/prison people with ADHD are more likely to reoffend quicker than inmates that do not have ADHD.

=== Emerging Areas in Criminal Psychology ===
As crime continues to evolve, so too does the field of criminal psychology. With the rise of cybercrime, criminal psychologists are increasingly called upon to understand the psychological profiles of online offenders, such as hackers or individuals engaged in cyberbullying. The anonymity provided by the internet can lead to unique psychological motivations and behaviors that traditional criminological theories may not fully address.

Additionally, neuropsychology is an emerging area that explores how brain injuries, developmental disorders, or neurological conditions can influence criminal behavior. Advances in brain imaging and neuroscience are helping researchers better understand the biological factors that may contribute to criminal actions.

== Career paths ==
A bachelor's degree in psychology or criminal justice as well as a master's degree in a related field are needed in order to pursue a career in criminal psychology. A doctorate, either a Ph.D. or a Psy.D, typically yields higher pay and more lucrative job opportunities. In addition to degrees, a licensing exam is required by state or jurisdiction.

Criminal profilers require a master's degree or a doctorate, several years of experience and in some cases passing state examinations to become a licensed psychologist.

Criminal profilers can work in various settings including offices and courtrooms and can be employed at a number of institutions. Some include local, state, or federal government, and others can be self-employed as independent consultants. As of 2021, the average amount of a criminal psychologist is $58,246 and can increase to $95,000. Several factors contribute to how much a person makes within the field, including how much time a person has worked within the field, and the city with which a person works in. Criminal psychologists who work within larger cities tend to make more than psychologists who work in lower populated cities. Those who work for hospitals or federal government tend to have a lower salary. Some of the top paying states for forensic psychologists are New Hampshire, Washington, New York, Massachusetts, and California.

Forensic psychology careers include:

1. Correctional counselor
2. Jail supervisor
3. Victim advocate
4. Jury consultant
5. Forensic social worker
6. Expert witness
7. Forensic psychology professor
8. Forensic psychology researcher
9. Forensic case manager
10. Criminal profiler
11. Forensic psychologist
12. Correctional psychologist

== Key studies ==
A number of key studies of psychology especially relevant to understanding criminal psychology have been undertaken. These include:

- Bobo doll experiment (Bandura, Ross & Ross 1961)
- The Stanford prison experiment (Philip Zimbardo 1973)
- Eyewitness study (Loftus, Palmer 1974)

These studies remain important because they helped shape modern ideas about aggression, behavior, and memory. Their findings continue to influence criminal investigations, courtroom procedures, and psychological research.

== See also ==
- Forensic psychology
- Moral psychology
- Criminal anthropology
- Antisocial personality disorder
- Psychopathy
- Malignant narcissism
- Sadistic personality disorder
