= Shinigami =

Kami of death

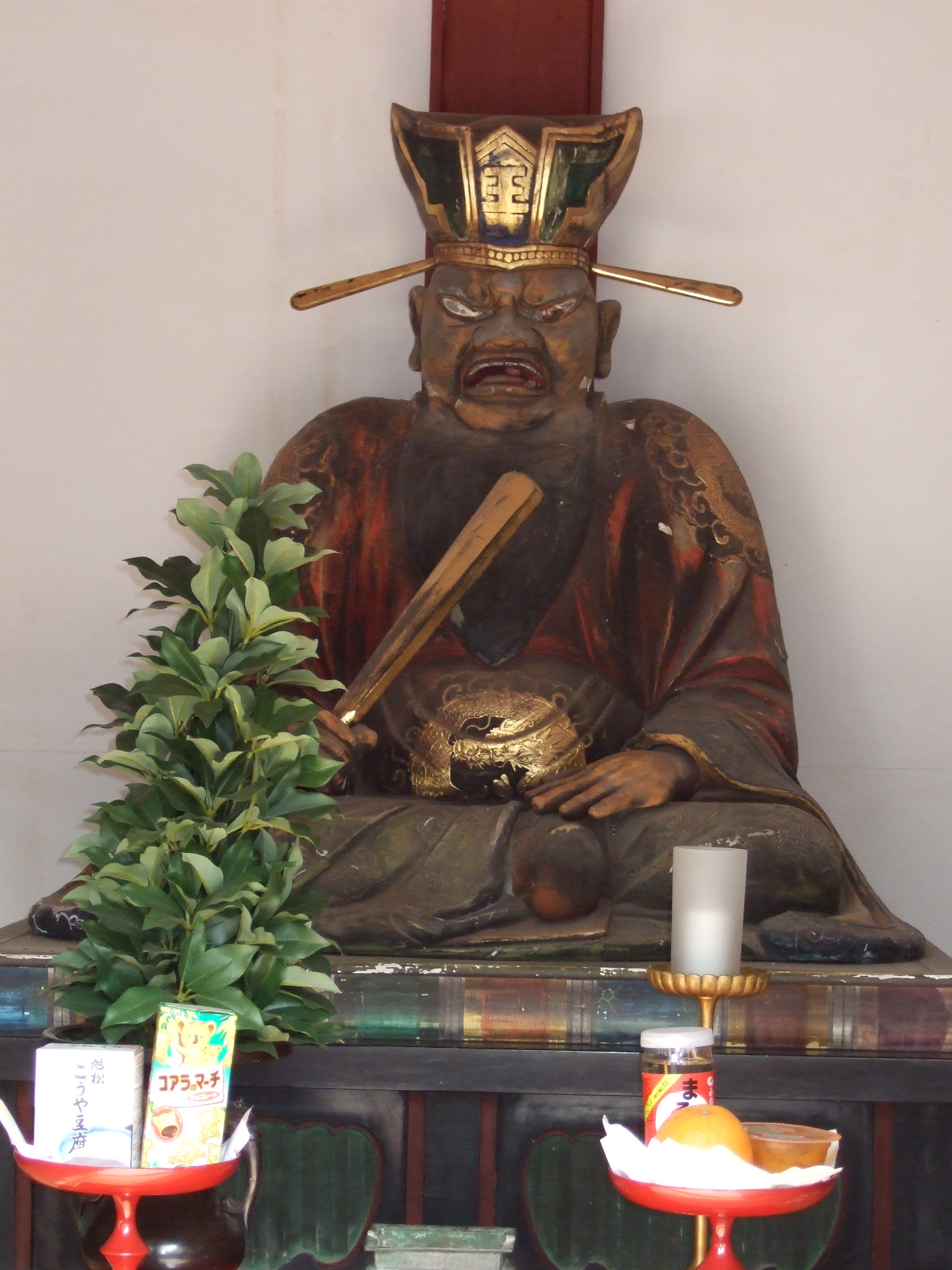
Statue of Yama

Shinigami (Japanese: 死神, lit. 'kami of death') are kami that invite humans toward death in certain aspects of Shintoism and Japanese culture. Shinigami have been described as monsters, helpers, and creatures of darkness. Shinigami are used for tales and religions in Japanese culture.

== Japanese religion ==
In Buddhism, there is the Mara that is concerned with death, the Mrtyu-mara. It is a demon that makes humans want to die, and it is said that upon being possessed by it, in a shock, one should suddenly want to die by suicide, so it is sometimes explained to be a "shinigami". Also, in the Yogacarabhumi-sastra, a writing on Yogacara, a demon decided the time of people's deaths. Yama, the king of the Underworld, as well as oni such as the Ox-Head and Horse-Face, are also considered a type of shinigami.

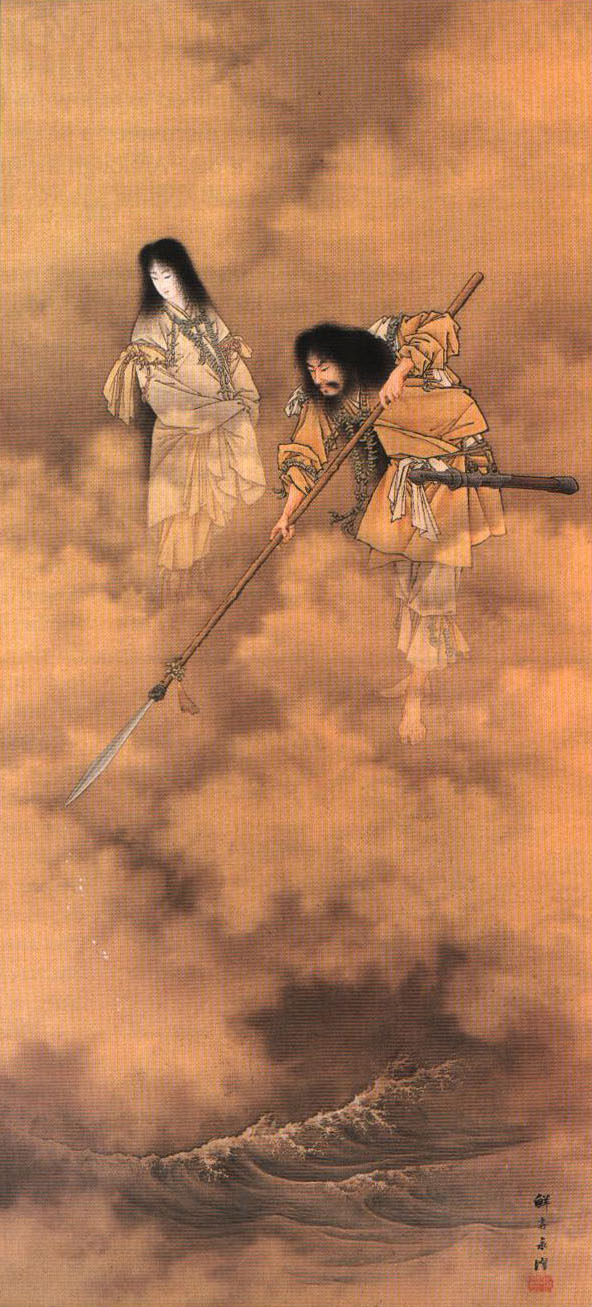
Izanami and Izanagi Creating the Japanese Islands by Kobayashi Eitaku (Izanami to left)

In Shinto and Japanese mythology, Izanami gave humans death, so she is sometimes seen as a shinigami. However, Izanami and Yama are also thought to be different from the death gods in Western mythology. Some forms of Buddhism do not involve believing in any deities, so it is sometimes thought that the concept of a death god does not exist to begin with. Even though the kijin and onryō of Japanese Buddhist faith have taken humans' lives, there is the opinion that there is no "death god" that merely leads people into the world of the dead. In Postwar Japan, however, the Western notion of a death god entered Japan, and shinigami started to become mentioned as an existence with a human nature.

== Ningyō jōruri ==
Generally, the word "shinigami" does not appear to be used in Japanese classical literature, and there are not many writings about them; however, going into the Edo period, the word 'shinigami' can be seen in Chikamatsu Monzaemon's works of ningyō jōruri and classical literature that had themes on double suicides.

In Hōei 3 (1706), in a performance of "Shinchuu Nimai Soushi", concerning men and women who were invited towards death, it was written "the road the god of death leads towards", and in Hōei 6 (1709), in "Shinchuuha ha Koori no Sakujitsu", a woman who was about to commit double suicide with a man said, "the fleetingness of a life lured by a god of death". It never became clear whether the man and woman came to commit double suicide due to the existence of a shinigami, or if a shinigami was given as an example for their situation of double suicide, and there are also interpretations that the word "shinigami" is an expression for the fleetingness of life.

Other than that, in Kyōhō 5 (1720), in a performance of The Love Suicides at Amijima, there was the expression, "of one possessed by a god of death". Since the character was seller of paper, the character who confronted death wrote "paper" (紙, kami) as "god" (神, kami), but there are also interpretations that Chikamatsu himself did not think about the existence of a shinigami.

== Classical literature ==
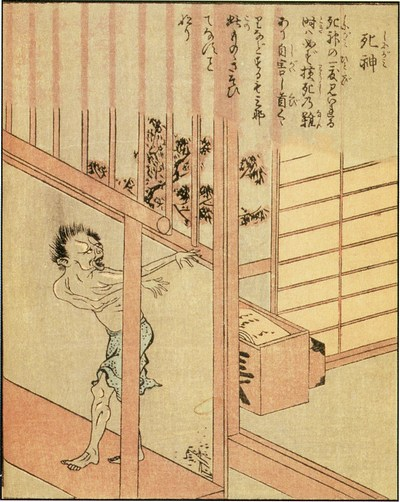
Shinigami as illustrated in the Ehon Hyaku Monogatari (1841)

In the classical literature of the Edo period, shinigami that would possess humans are mentioned. In the Ehon Hyaku Monogatari from Tenpō 12 (1841), there was a story titled "Shinigami". In this one, however, the shinigami was the spirit of a deceased person and had bad intent. Acting jointly with the malicious intent already within people who were living, those people were led on bad paths, which caused repeat incidents to occur at places where there was previously a murder incident (for example by causing the same suicide at places where people have hung themselves before), and thus these shinigami are somewhat like a possession that would cause people to want to die. Similar to this, according to the essay of the Bakumatsu period titled "Hogo no Uragaki", there were the itsuki that made people want to commit suicide through various means, namely hanging, as well as things told through folk religion such as gaki-tsuki and shichinin misaki.

In the later Edo Period, the essay "Shōzan Chomon Kishū" in Kaei 3 (1850) by the essayist Miyoshi Shōzan, the one titled "upon possession by a shinigami, it becomes difficult to speak, or easier to tell lies" was a story where a prostitute possessed by a shinigami invites a man to commit double suicide, and in the kabuki Mekuranagaya Umega Kagatobi by Kawatake Mokuami in Meiji 19 (1886), a shinigami enters into people's thoughts, making them think about bad things they have done and want to die. These are, rather than gods, more like yūki (meaning ghosts and yūrei), or evil spirits.

In the San-yūtei Enchō of classical rakugo, there was a programme titled "Shinigami", but this was something that was not thought of independently in Japan, but rather from adaptions of the Italian opera the Crispino e la comare and the Grimm Fairy Tale "Godfather Death".

== Folk religion ==
Shinigami are also spoken about in folk religion after the war. According to the mores of Miyajima, Kumamoto Prefecture, those who go out and return to attend to someone through the night must drink tea or eat a bowl of rice before sleeping, and it is said that a shinigami would visit if this was ignored.

In the Hamamatsu area, Shizuoka Prefecture, a shinigami would possess people and lead them to mountains, seas, and railroads where people have died. In those places, the dead would have a "death turn" (shiniban), and as long as there is nobody to die there next, they shall never ascend even if they were given a service, and it was said that people who were alive would be invited by the dead to come next. Also, it is ordinary to visit graves for the sake of Higan during noon or when the sun sets, but in the Okayama Prefecture, visiting the grave for Higan during sunrise without a previous time would result in being possessed by a shinigami. However, once one has visited the grave in sunset, then it would become necessary to visit the grave again during sunrise, to avoid a shinigami possessing one's body. With this background of folk belief, it is also thought that sometimes people would consider the ghosts of the deceased, who have nobody to deify them, to be seeking companions and inviting people to join them.

== In popular culture ==
Shinigami have appeared in many anime and manga series, notably playing a very important role in Death Note. The plot revolves around a mysterious black notebook, the "Death Note", with the ability to kill anyone whose name is written in its pages; it was originally owned by a shinigami named Ryuk, who dropped it into the human world out of boredom.

== See also ==
- Ankou - the equivalent in Celtic mythology
- Azrael - the angel of death in Abrahamic religions
- Death (personification) - personifications of death
- Heibai Wuchang - Chinese angels of death
- King Yama - judge of the dead who presides over Narakas
- Kṣitigarbha - Bodhisattva of hell-beings
- Psychopomp - any entity that guides the souls of the dead to the afterlife
- Thanatos - the god of death in Greek mythology
- Yanluo Wang - ruler of Youdu

== Bibliography ==
- 大藤時彦 他 (1986). 相賀徹夫 編 (ed.). 日本大百科全書. Vol. 第11巻. 小学館. ISBN 978-4-09-526011-2.
- 木村文輝 (2007). 生死の仏教学. 法藏館. ISBN 978-4-8318-2418-9.
- 多田克己 (1997). "『絵本百物語』の妖怪たち". 絵本百物語 桃山人夜話. 国書刊行会. ISBN 978-4-336-03948-4.
- 近松門左衛門 (1998). 近松門左衛門集. 新編日本古典文学全集. Vol. 2. 鳥越文蔵 他校中・訳. 小学館. ISBN 978-4-09-658075-2.
- 七会静 (2009). よくわかる「世界の死神」事典. 廣済堂文庫. 廣済堂. ISBN 978-4-331-65459-0.
- 村上健司 他編著 (2000). 百鬼夜行解体新書. コーエー. ISBN 978-4-87719-827-5.
- 村上健司編著 (2005). 日本妖怪大事典. Kwai books. 角川書店. ISBN 978-4-04-883926-6.
