= List of Mermaid Melody Pichi Pichi Pitch episodes =

Episodes of Japanese animated television series

The Mermaid Princesses as of Mermaid Melody Pichi Pichi Pitch Pure. Clockwise from upper left: Seira, Coco, Caren, Lucia, Hanon, Rina, Noel.

The Mermaid Melody Pichi Pichi Pitch animated television series is based on the shōjo manga of the same name created by Pink Hanamori. The episodes, produced by the animation studios Actas and Synergy Japan, are directed by Yoshitaka Fujimoto, written by Junki Takegami, and features character design by Kazuaki Makida, who based the designs on illustrations by Pink Hanamori. The story basically follows the main character Lucia Nanami, Mermaid Princess of the North Pacific Ocean, searches for and woos Kaito Dōmoto, a boy she rescued seven years before, while at the same time, she and Hanon Hōshō and Rina Tōin, Princesses of the South and North Atlantic Ocean respectively, battle minion sea monsters using their voices and some magic microphones.

ADV Films acquired the license to the anime in June 2004 for its North American release, but was eventually dropped due to difficulty in finding backers and securing a TV airing deal.

The anime is composed of 91 episodes, divided into two seasons listed below.

The anime also uses six theme songs, as well as several mermaid battle and image songs and tunes sung by other characters. Most of them were compiled into a total of nine singles and four "vocal collection" albums (two for each season), as well as soundtrack albums for the two seasons.

== Episode list ==
=== Mermaid Melody Pichi Pichi Pitch ===
The first season, simply known as Mermaid Melody Pichi Pichi Pitch, aired on Japan's TV Tokyo Network (through TV Aichi) between April 5, 2003, and March 27, 2004. It chronicles the basic premise mentioned above and adapts stories from the first twenty chapters of the manga. They were compiled into 14 DVD volumes.

There are four theme songs used in this season. The first opening theme, "Taiyō no Rakuen ~Promised Land~" (太陽の楽園 ~Promised Land~; lit. 'Paradise of the Sun ~Promised Land~') by Miyuki Kanbe, and the first ending theme "Daiji na Takarabako" (大事な宝箱; lit. 'Important Treasure Box') by Asumi Nakata, are used in the first 28 episodes. For the rest of the season, "Rainbow Notes♪" by Kanbe and "Sekai de Ichiban Hayaku Asa ga kuru Basho" (世界で一番早く朝が来る場所; lit. 'The Place Where Morning Comes First') by Nakata, Hitomi Terakado, and Mayumi Asano, are the second opening and ending themes respectively.

No.	Title	Original release date
1	"The Pearl Tear"; Transliteration: "Shinju no Namida" (Japanese: 真珠の涙)	April 5, 2003
Lucia Nanami, the mermaid princess of the North Pacific, sets out to land to find the surfer boy to whom she entrusted her pearl seven years ago. She finds him, who is named as Kaito Domoto, but does not know it is him until later. This is the first time she has transformed into Pink Pearl Voice, and she is able to use music to cast away the sea demon Izuru. Mermaid Lucia and Kaito have a lovely reunion.
2	"Feelings I Can't Say"; Transliteration: "Ienai Kokoro" (Japanese: 言えない心)	April 12, 2003
Hanon Hosho airs her disapproval to Lucia's new relationship with Kaito, since mermaids cannot reveal their identities to a human directly, as this will cause them to turn into sea foam. Despite this, during a festival later, Hanon also finds love. The mermaid Lucia prays Kaito to "find" her. Hanon's mermaid form is also revealed as the South Atlantic Mermaid Princess.
3	"Swaying Thoughts"; Transliteration: "Yureru Omoi" (Japanese: 揺れる想い)	April 19, 2003
Hanon finds out that the handsome man she met at the festival is her music teacher, Taro Mitsuki. A transfer student in Lucia's class, Rina Toin, finds Kaito suspicious. Meanwhile, one of Lucia's idols checks into the hotel under a secret identity.
4	"The Lonesome Princess"; Transliteration: "Kodoku na Ōjō" (Japanese: 孤独な王女)	April 26, 2003
A new sea demon, Yuri, appears during a concert given by Taro and uses her music to hypnotize the attendees and attack the mermaid princesses, who are also there. Rina reveals herself to be the mermaid princess of the North Atlantic and then makes acquaintances with Lucia and Hanon. The three mermaids become known as the trio teen idols.
5	"An Icy Kiss"; Transliteration: "Tsumetai Kisu" (Japanese: 冷たいキス)	May 3, 2003
When a young pink dolphin named Momo is separated from his mother and placed in the local aquarium, Lucia and friends help him. Kaito and Mermaid Lucia kiss.
6	"Light of Love"; Transliteration: "Ai no Tōka" (Japanese: 愛の灯火)	May 10, 2003
Nikora tells Lucia and Hanon a legend about a cave that grants true love to anyone who lights a candle with the bearer and his/her true love on it. As Lucia plans to light a candle with Kaito's name on it, she also experiences conflicting emotions when she realizes Kaito still hasn't yet discovered she is his precious mermaid.
7	"A Mermaid's Jealousy"; Transliteration: "Māmeido no Jerashī" (Japanese: 人魚(マーメイド)の嫉妬(ジェラシー))	May 17, 2003
When Lucia hears a rumor that Kaito is dating an older girl, she sets out to investigate. A beautiful emerald found in the ruins of Rina's kingdom becomes the star attraction of a cruise liner gallery, and Eriru attempts to steal it to lure the mermaid princesses to her.
8	"Frozen Feeling"; Transliteration: "Kootia Kimochi" (Japanese: 凍った気持)	May 24, 2003
Lucia sets out to make a bento for Kaito, hoping that it will encourage him enough to help him win his next surfing competition, but complications arise as the West Japan's surfing champ shows up in town.
9	"Stolen Melody"; Transliteration: "Nusumareta Merodī" (Japanese: 盗まれた曲(メロディー))	May 31, 2003
Encouraged by how well Lucia's bento went with Kaito, Hanon decides to prepare a bento for Taro as well. They also find out about a tune their teacher wrote for the mermaid he met during a trip in India.
10	"Images Of The Past"; Transliteration: "Kako no Omokage" (Japanese: 過去の面影)	June 7, 2003
Rina is chosen as a model by a modeling agent who sees her as the mermaid he saw a long time ago. They also get a chance to overcome their past.
11	"The Wishing Ring"; Transliteration: "Negai no Yubiwa" (Japanese: 願いの指輪)	June 14, 2003
While on a class trip to an island, Lucia hears a legend about a buried treasure said to grant anyone's wish. She decides to find the treasure, hoping it will improve her relationship with Kaito.
12	"Crossed Hearts"; Transliteration: "Sure Chigau Kokoro" (Japanese: すれ違う心)	June 21, 2003
On Lucia's birthday, Kaito and his friends throw her a birthday party at a beach house. Later, a letter arrives from the palace in the North Pacific Ocean (Lucia's home) announcing that her coming-of-age party will take place on her birthday, the same day as the birthday party.
13	"Mermaid's Ritual"; Transliteration: "Māmeido no Gishiki" (Japanese: =人魚(マーメイド)の儀式)	June 28, 2003
As the Mermaid Princess Lucia undergoes a rite of passage, Gaito, the main antagonist (who resembles Kaito), and his minions crash in to kidnap Lucia and steal her pearl. Momo drags Kaito to Lucia's palace. Aqua Regina, the sea goddess, appears, gives Lucia a new song, and tells her that she must summon her quickly in order save the Marine World.
14	"Memories of The Starry Sky"; Transliteration: "Hoshizora no Kioku" (Japanese: 星空の記憶)	July 5, 2003
With the anniversary of the day that Lucia (in her mermaid form) and Kaito met, she wants to have a date under the starry sky again and follows him around to show their courage. She soon finds out that Kaito is visiting his parents' grave that day. Later on, Kaito realizes that Lucia is the mermaid that rescued him, but only for a brief moment while fighting a Dark Lover, Maria, as he unleashes a mysterious light power.
15	"A Promise at the Water's Edge"; Transliteration: "Nagisa no Yakusoku" (Japanese: 渚の約束)	July 12, 2003
As Lucia is looking forward to summer vacation, she asks Kaito to help her study for the pre-vacation exams.
16	"Hidden Feelings"; Transliteration: "Himeta Omoi" (Japanese: 秘めた想い)	July 19, 2003
As the girls help Kaito and his friends work at a seaside restaurant to help the business, Rina realizes that she has some conflicting emotions regarding Kaito.
17	"A Fleeting Kiss"; Transliteration: "Hakanai Kisu" (Japanese: 儚いキス)	July 26, 2003
Lucia, Hanon, and Rina enter a so-called haunted house, but they later find out about its secret. Meanwhile, Kaito also enters the house with another girl on a dare. In the end, the spirits of the two lovers possess Kaito and Lucia's bodies to share a kiss before rising to the afterlife.
18	"A Young Visitor"; Transliteration: "Osanai Hōmonsha" (Japanese: 幼い訪問者)	August 2, 2003
Meru, a South Atlantic mermaid from Hanon's kingdom, comes to land, asking Lucia, Hanon, and Rina to help her find her mother.
19	"The Summer Temptations"; Transliteration: "Natsu no Yūwaku" (Japanese: 夏の誘惑)	August 9, 2003
Lucia gets separated from the other mermaids after a rock concert. Without her phone and money, she is found by a boy named Ryo, who asks her singing karaoke while trying to find her friends.
20	"A Love Letter From the Sea"; Transliteration: "Umi Kara Rabu Retā" (Japanese: 海から恋文(ラブレター))	August 16, 2003
Lucia, Hanon, and Rina find a love letter encapsuled inside a bottle. Soon, they search for the letter author's identity.
21	"A Small First Love"; Transliteration: "Chiisana Hatsukoi" (Japanese: 小さな初恋)	August 23, 2003
A little boy (Kaito's cousin) becomes fascinated by Lucia's mermaid form and vows to search for her. Meanwhile, Lucia, Hanon, and Rina join a beauty contest in which a plasma TV set is up for grabs.
22	"Glamorous Girl"; Transliteration: "Genwaku no Shōjo" (Japanese: 幻惑の少女)	August 30, 2003
Taro has been reassigned as Lucia, Hanon, and Rina's homeroom teacher. Delighted, Hanon organizes an outdoor welcome party for him. At the barbecue, Taro follows a girl whom he believes is a mermaid that he once saw. After Maria fails to capture the trio once again, she informs Gaito about Kaito, revealing he is his other relative.
23	"Love Fever"; Transliteration: "Koi no Binetsu" (Japanese: 恋の微熱)	September 6, 2003
A battle between the Mermaid Princesses and Maria has caused Kaito to catch a cold. Worried, Lucia stays at Kaito's home to cure him where things go crazy while she uses an emotional control pearl.
24	"Dreams Are Like Brides"; Transliteration: "Yume wa Hanayome" (Japanese: 夢は花嫁)	September 13, 2003
Meru returns to land in a playful attempt to marry Kaito, but soon realizes that Kaito likes Lucia.
25	"Moonlight Boy"; Transliteration: "Gekkō no Shōnen" (Japanese: 月光の少年)	September 20, 2003
Lucia, Hanon, and Rina accidentally discover Hippo's ability to turn into a young boy. He also falls in love with a Dark Lover, Yuri.
26	"Caren's Song"; Transliteration: "Karen no Uta" (Japanese: かれんの唄)	September 27, 2003
Lucia, Hanon, and Rina join Kaito in his trip to a surfing contest. Meanwhile, the Dark Lovers attack the trio, but a new purple mermaid saves them.
27	"The Heart That Believes"; Transliteration: "Shinjiru Kokoro" (Japanese: 信じる心)	October 4, 2003
The purple mermaid from the previous episode introduces herself as Caren, the mermaid princess of the Antarctic Ocean, and the younger twin sister of Noel, the mermaid princess of the Arctic Ocean, whom Rina was with when she was captured. Later, Rina experiences a guilt trip as she remembers how she was forced to abandon her friend when Gaito attacked. The Black Beauty Sisters are introduced.
28	"Bonds"; Transliteration: "KIZUNA"	October 11, 2003
Lucia, Hanon, and Rina, on a quest to save Caren in a coral reef, are lured into a trap set by the Black Beauty Sisters. Aqua Regina gives the trio a new song (thanks to Kaito). Caren forgives Rina about Noel in the end.
29	"A Masked Confession"; Transliteration: "Kamen no Kokuhaku" (Japanese: 仮面の告白)	October 18, 2003
Lucia's class has organized a play in which Lucia will act as the lead, but a surfing accident involving Lucia's leading man causes Kaito to star beside her.
30	"Eyes of Ice"; Transliteration: "Kōri no Hitomi" (Japanese: 氷の瞳)	October 25, 2003
Gaito disguises himself as Kaito to know Lucia's feelings. In a dream, Kaito is in a predicament when Gaito force him to realize that he has to eventually choose either Lucia or the mermaid.
31	"A Dangerous Trap"; Transliteration: "Kikenna Wana" (Japanese: 危険な罠)	November 1, 2003
Lucia, Hanon, and Rina decide to use bait to lure out the Dark Lovers and let them lead the way to Gaito's castle. Caren comes along with Kaito. They witness Gaito's castle moving, but it will not be easy to release their other fellow princesses. Lucia also discovers Kaito's power.
32	"Love Is Colored with Dreams"; Transliteration: "Koi wa Yumeiro" (Japanese: 恋は夢色)	November 8, 2003
Lucia finds a stone which makes dreams come true in one way or another, but she starts running away from Kaito after a recent dream sees him being mad at her.
33	"Amusement Park Panic"; Transliteration: "Yūenchi Panikku" (Japanese: 遊園地騒動(パニック))	November 15, 2003
As an amusement park is about to open, Lucia and Hanon are excited to go there, while Rina senses something suspicious.
34	"Auri's Day"; Transliteration: "Auri no Hi" (Japanese: アウリの日)	November 22, 2003
Auri, an abalone spirit who is notorious for her exploding experiments, trains under Taki to be a magician and fortune teller. Lucia, Hanon, and Rina keep an eye on her so she will not get into trouble.
35	"Melody of Sadness"; Transliteration: "Kanashimi no Merodī" (Japanese: 悲しみの曲(メロディー))	November 29, 2003
Hanon is worried about Taro and goes to ask him about the mermaid he saw. Taro tells Hanon, Rina, Lucia, and Kaito the story of when he met Sara, the mermaid princess of the Indian Ocean. The Black Beauty Sisters turn up to ruin his concert.
36	"Beloved Baby"; Transliteration: "Itoshi no Bebī" (Japanese: 愛(いとし)のベビー)	December 6, 2003
Lucia and Hanon find a lost baby and decide to take it in, but this baby seems to be clingy around Lucia. In the end, the baby revealed be a coral spirit of Lucia's kingdom that came to see Lucia and is surprised to discover Kaito's power.
37	"Rumored Couple"; Transliteration: "Uwasa no Futari" (Japanese: 噂のふたり)	December 13, 2003
Lucia, Hanon, and Rina hear a rumor about a set of beads said to be given to a human lady by a mermaid, which eventually led to that human's marriage.
38	"A Christmas Present"; Transliteration: "Kurisumasu no Okurimono" (Japanese: 聖夜(クリスマス)の贈物)	December 20, 2003
A woman approaches Lucia and dares her to show her Kaito's baby pictures. Lucia becomes depressed after Kaito shouts at her, telling Lucia that he does not have any baby pictures. In the end, the woman turns out to be Kaito's aunt, who came to give him a letter from his parents, revealing he is not their real son. Lucia gives Kaito his Christmas present as he grabs her hand.
39	"P in P (Panic in Pearl Piari)"; Transliteration: "Panikku in Pāru Piari" (Japanese: =P(パニック)インP(パールピアリ))	December 27, 2003
Hours before a scheduled New Year's concert, Lucia, Hanon, and Rina fight over melon pudding. The Dark Lovers check into the hotel and try to make them up.
40	"An Epic New Year's First Dream Battle"; Transliteration: "Hatsuyume Daisakusen" (Japanese: 初夢大作戦)	January 2, 2004
Lucia, Hanon, and Rina share a crazy dream, which sees them having a career in show business.
41	"Love Among Grown-Ups"; Transliteration: "Otona no Koi" (Japanese: オトナの恋)	January 10, 2004
Maki, the owner of the beach house, asks Nikora's hand for marriage. As Nikora agrees, Lucia, Hanon, and Rina try to stop her, knowing she is also a mermaid.
42	"A Tear's Location"; Transliteration: "Namida no Yukue" (Japanese: 涙の行方)	January 17, 2004
Hippo and Yūri are caught by Lucia, Hanon, and Rina having a tryst. Because of this, he is forbidden to see Yūri. With both Hippo and Yūri sad, Lucia arranges a meeting between the two.
43	"Song of Suspicion"; Transliteration: "Ayakashi no Uta" (Japanese: 妖しの歌)	January 24, 2004
Rina, Lucia, and Hanon are approached by three not very bright, self-centered men, who have been hired by Black Beauty Sisters to find and capture the Mermaid Princesses. Taro encounters his old beloved mermaid princess, Sara.
44	"A Miracle on a Snowy Night"; Transliteration: "Yukiyo no Kiseki" (Japanese: 雪夜の奇蹟)	January 31, 2004
A huge snowstorm cancels a scheduled skiing trip, causing Lucia to go missing. Kaito realized Lucia is the most important person to him.
45	"A Couple's Feelings"; Transliteration: "Futatsu no Omoi" (Japanese: 二つの想い)	February 7, 2004
While going a date, Lucia realizes that Kaito's mind is still with his mermaid. Meanwhile, Izūru and Yūri have their hands on a cameraman.
46	"Goodbye"; Transliteration: "Sayonara" (Japanese: さよなら)	February 14, 2004
On Valentine's Day, Lucia finds out that Kaito is heading for Hawaii. As Lucia is saddened by the news, Kaito comes after her to talk to her. During sunset on the beach, Kaito confesses to Lucia and gives her a ring before they kiss.
47	"A Dark Invitation"; Transliteration: "Kuroi Inbitēshon" (Japanese: 黒い招待状(インビテーション))	February 21, 2004
Gaito appears to Kaito in a dream. Sara appears to Taro and gives him a "key" to Gaito's castle.
48	"Kaito's Nightmare"; Transliteration: "Kaito no Akumu" (Japanese: 海斗の悪夢)	February 28, 2004
Kaito has another strange dream. Gaito reveals he and Kaito are brothers and members of a marine clan known as the Pantharassa, and Kaito appears to be in Gaito's castle at the end.
49	"Heartbeat"; Transliteration: "KODOU"	March 6, 2004
Sheshe and Mimi steal the two captured mermaids' pearls. Once the Black Beauty Sisters are used to power their evil microphones, they dare the four Mermaid Princess to fight them. Aqua Regina gives the Mermaid Princesses a new song. Hippo retrieves the "key" that allows him to transform into his true self – the Hippocampus.
50	"Darkness of the Heart"; Transliteration: "Kokoro no Yami" (Japanese: 心の闇)	March 13, 2004
Lucia, Hanon, Rina, and Caren go to Gaito's castle to stop his plans of world domination and rescue two friends, Noel and Coco (the mermaid princesses of the South Pacific) in the process. As Coco begs Sara to return to her old self, Lucia is forced to challenge her own heart.
51	"Resurrected Truth"; Transliteration: "Yomigaeru Shinjitsu" (Japanese: 蘇る真実)	March 20, 2004
The six Mermaid Princesses found out about Gaito and Kaito's relationship, then discover a hypnotized Taro, only to fight against one of their own. Sara's broken heart has been cured by Taro's forgiveness and her hair color changes to orange.
52	"Last Kiss"; Transliteration: "Saigo no Kisu" (Japanese: 最後のキス)	March 27, 2004
After Kaito figures out about Lucia's identity, the Mermaid Princesses gather together to defeat Gaito by summoning Aqua Regina at last. However, Sara joins Gaito in his death near the end. When Kaito awakens, he embraces Lucia to their happy reunion.

=== Mermaid Melody Pichi Pichi Pitch Pure ===
The second season, known as Mermaid Melody Pichi Pichi Pitch Pure, aired in Japan's TV Tokyo Network (through TV Aichi) between April 3 and December 25, 2004. Unlike the first season, Pure was compiled into two DVD box sets containing a total of 11 discs. Adapting stories from chapter 21 to 30 of the manga, this season chronicles Lucia's struggles and worries as she faces a new foe and his own minions.

This season differed strongly from the first, mainly in the quality of animation, especially in the last few episodes. They also reused stock footage. The secondary trio became a source of comic relief rather than plot complications, and the series' new "twist" was that all the new villains had image songs. Finally, the themes differed in that the series focused more on the trials of losing love, losing heart (literally and figuratively), and good decisions for one person always hurting another. While the first season was loosely based on the first half of Hans Christian Andersen's "The Little Mermaid", this season was inspired by the second half, introducing a character named Michal, who fils the role of Lucia's rival.

There are only two pieces of theme music used in this season. The opening theme is "Before the Moment" by Eri Kitamura while "Ai no Ondo °C" (愛の温度°C; lit. 'The Temperature of Love°C') by Nakata, Terakado, and Asano is the ending song.

No. overall	No. in series	Title	Original release date
53	1	"Morning of Separation"; Transliteration: "Wakare no Asa" (Japanese: 別れの朝)	April 3, 2004
Kaito flies to Hawaii after spending a night with Lucia and saying goodbye to her; she soon meets Rihito Amagi, who seems fond of her. Taro announces his plans of heading to Germany, leaving Hanon disappointed. Lucia sees the image of a young mermaid in her dreams. Lucia, Hanon, and Rina face a new foe, Michel, a powerful angel.
54	2	"That Horizon"; Transliteration: "Suiheisen no Kanata" (Japanese: 水平線の彼方)	April 10, 2004
Lucia gets a phone call saying that Kaito is lost at sea and sets out to the open sea to search for him. The Black Beauty Sisters have returned. Lucia learns the mermaid in her dreams is Sara's successor Seira.
55	3	"Aquamarine Melody"; Transliteration: "Mizuiro no Merodī" (Japanese: 水色の旋律(メロディー))	April 17, 2004
Hanon wants to say goodbye to Taro, but she gets stalled. She reaches him at last and gets a present from him, a music sheet written just for her. After Taro's flight takes off however, the music sheet blows away, leaving Hanon upset and a mysterious boy to retrieve it.
56	4	"A Premonition of Happiness"; Transliteration: "Shiawase no Yokan" (Japanese: 幸せの予感)	April 24, 2004
Rina gets a letter from her whale friend, saying she should return home. She also meets a flirty boy named Masahiro Hamasaki, whom she keeps on meeting. Rina changes her mind about the offer to return home at the last second.
57	5	"Maestro"; Transliteration: "Maesutoro" (Japanese: マエストロ)	May 1, 2004
Hanon and Lucia go to a concert, where Rihito conducts an orchestra. Rina accidentally meets with Masahiro again. The mermaids scorned a monstrous fish in the form of an old man playing a cursed accordion. Hippo saved the mermaids.
58	6	"The Young Man"; Transliteration: "Toshishita no Otoko no Ko" (Japanese: 年下の男の子)	May 8, 2004
Kaito has finally returned, but he has lost his memories of Lucia and everything that involves the ocean. Hanon has also found herself a suitor, Nagisa Shirai, who seems to be the retriever of the music sheet Taro gave her. To make things worse for Lucia, Kaito is with another girl, Michal, who is Rihito's sister, causing Lucia to fall into deep depression and vow she will restore Kaito's memories.
59	7	"Her Stolen Heart"; Transliteration: "Ubawareta Kokoro" (Japanese: 奪われた心)	May 15, 2004
Lucia pinpoints the location of Seira's spirit in India, but before Seira's spirit merges with the orange pearl, Michel absorbs Seira within himself. Lucia must now collect the falling heart fragments of Seira in order for her to be brought back to life.
60	8	"The End of the Memories"; Transliteration: "Kioku no Hate" (Japanese: 記憶の果て)	May 22, 2004
In an effort to have Kaito's memories returned, Lucia, Hanon, Rina, and some of Kaito's friends let him take up surfing lessons again. Lucia appears as a mermaid to Kaito to help him remember at last.
61	9	"Love Etude"; Transliteration: "Koi no Echūdo" (Japanese: 恋の練習曲(エチュード))	May 29, 2004
Hanon decides to play the sheet music Taro gives her, but she can't play the piano, so Nagisa buys her a piano book to help her, only to have Kaito help her instead. This episode introduces Lady Bat, a new villain, and Hanon's new image song "Mizuiro no Senritsu".
62	10	"Leftover Feelings"; Transliteration: "Nokoru Omoi" (Japanese: 残る想い)	June 5, 2004
Rina returns to her country in the North Atlantic Ocean to attend a ceremony there, but she also starts to miss Masahiro and ends up missing something very important for him.
63	11	"Her Brother's Feelings"; Transliteration: "Aniki no Kimochi" (Japanese: 兄の気持ち)	June 12, 2004
Lucia, Hanon, and Rina hang out with Kaito and Michal around town by shopping.
64	12	"The Marine Mermaid's Light"; Transliteration: "Hikari no Umi no Māmeido" (Japanese: 光の海の人魚(マーメイド))	June 19, 2004
Coco invites Lucia, Hanon, and Rina to come with her to the Indian Ocean to help search for the Legendary Spiral Shell. It turns out to be Sara's shell that held all of her memories, and the four, along with Hippo, battle the Black Beauty Sisters for it.
65	13	"His Secret"; Transliteration: "Kare no Himitsu" (Japanese: カレの秘密)	June 26, 2004
Hanon and Rina are at an ice cream parlor, eating ice cream, when Rina meets Masahiro there. Nagisa also meets Masahiro after misjudging that he was flirting with Hanon. The next day, Hanon shows Rina a magazine with a picture of Masahiro and his rich father. At this point, Rina wants to know more about Masahiro, but she gets upset when Masahiro refused to tell her the truth on why he likes motorcycling and boxing. He sends her tickets to go to his boxing match, an offer which she turns down, and Masahiro loses to a world champion.
66	14	"Voice From the Dark"; Transliteration: "Yami Kara no Koe" (Japanese: 闇からの声)	July 3, 2004
Rina notices Kaito is paying more attention to Lucia. Then, she offers him a trip to the cave with lighted candles, and he remembers something. Gaito's spirit appears before Kaito, reminding him who is his most important person. Aqua Regina appears and gives the Mermaid Princesses a new song. This episode introduces Lanhua, a new villain.
67	15	"Prayer of the Seven Seas"; Transliteration: "Nanatsu no Umi no Inori" (Japanese: 七つの海の祈り)	July 10, 2004
Lucia, Hanon, and Rina head for Antarctica after recent events there worry Caren. Something is causing an enormous iceberg to melt, which can create a tsunami across the whole globe. The mermaid princesses must use all their strength to prevent global disaster by Michel. Also, Caren finds love with a glaciologist named Subaru.
68	16	"It's Summer Vacation! Let's Gather, Everybody!"; Transliteration: "Natsu Yasumi Da Yo! Zen-in Shūgō" (Japanese: 夏休みだヨ!全員集合)	July 17, 2004
In order for Maki's beach house to compete with a nearby hotel, Lucia, Hanon, and Rina hire Caren, Noel, and Coco to help them with their chores. The six Mermaid Princesses engage in a beach volleyball match against some guests of the hotel. This episode is considered non-filler due to the introduction of the secondary trio and the establishment of their new role.
69	17	"A Midsummer Night's Celebration"; Transliteration: "Manatsu no Serebu na Yoru" (Japanese: 真夏のセレブな夜)	July 24, 2004
Nagisa obtains a pair of celebration tickets from Masahiro and decides to take Hanon out, but his plans to have Hanon's consent end up with him being played around by Coco, Noel, and Caren in order for Hanon to realize her true feelings for Nagisa. This takes a turn for the worse when Hanon gets jealous. When Nagisa is about to take Hanon to the celebration, he realizes that he lost the tickets, upsetting Hanon. He then decides to take her by boat to a view where the celebration takes place.
70	18	"Star Labyrinth"; Transliteration: "Hoshi no Rabirinsu" (Japanese: 星の迷宮(ラビリンス))	July 31, 2004
The six Mermaid Princesses find themselves in a magical world as a mysterious event grants two wishes at the same time. Hippo has a brief reunion with his beloved Yuri, and Seira enjoys one day of fun with Lucia.
71	19	"Song of Healing"; Transliteration: "Iyashi no Uta" (Japanese: 癒しの歌)	August 7, 2004
The King of the Squids, Somegorō, asks the Mermaid Princesses for help as his people are being terrorized by the Black Beauty Sisters.
72	20	"Love Detectives"; Transliteration: "Koi no Tentei" (Japanese: 恋の探偵)	August 14, 2004
To find out why Masahiro likes Rina so much, Caren goes out on a date with him while Coco and Noel watch from the sidelines, keeping Lucia and Hanon out of the fray.
73	21	"Love Intrusion"; Transliteration: "Koi no Fuhōshinnyū" (Japanese: 恋の不法侵入)	August 21, 2004
Lucia finds the key to Kaito's house and remembers the promise to keep his house clean while he was gone. When she is cleaning the bathroom, Lucia accidentally gets wet and decides to take a bath. Meanwhile, Kaito realizes that someone is in his house. Alala is introduced in this episode.
74	22	"Robber of Memories"; Transliteration: "Omoi de Dorobō" (Japanese: 思い出泥棒)	August 28, 2004
Coco, Noel, and Caren leave. Lucia then gets a strange box from Rihito. Later, Lucia, Hanon, and Rina believe that there is a robber at Pearl Piari when there is a mess in the kitchen, so they decide to set up traps, unintentionally catching Nagisa and finding out the thief was a cat. The box gets stolen, however, and Lucia looks all over town for it. In the end, it turns out that Rihito himself stole the box.
75	23	"Feelings Inside"; Transliteration: "Kokoro no Oku no Kokoro" (Japanese: 心の奥のこころ)	September 4, 2004
Lucia, Hanon, and Rina are invited to a concert wherein Rihito conducts an orchestra. During the performance, Rihito's power is suddenly revealed. Meanwhile, all of Michel's minions are given a new power made from a part of Seira's heart. All five surround the concert hall, singing, causing the concert hall to begin crumbling, after which Rihito starts using his power to keep the building together. Lady Bat, Lanhua, and Alala leave when it seems like the plan failed. The Black Beauty Sisters use their new power to create a new "dimension" and "clones" to sing another song. Suddenly, Aqua Regina appears and give the mermaids a new song.
76	24	"I Wish…"; Transliteration: "Watashi no Hoshii Mono" (Japanese: 私の欲しいもの)	September 11, 2004
To cheer up a crying Lucia, Hanon and Rina take her to a karaoke joint, which just happens to have their songs. They sing and get horrible scores on their own songs. Being angered by that, the three transform into their idol forms and sing, causing Lanhua (who was the cause of everything) to go capture them. Rihito gives Lucia a ride to nice scenery and offers her a gift, but he is surprised to hear that the only thing she wants is Kaito.
77	25	"Love Fortune"; Transliteration: "Koi Uranai" (Japanese: 恋占い)	September 17, 2004
Hanon tries to cheer Lucia up by bringing her to a fortune teller. The fortune teller advises Lucia to throw her most precious item in the sea (which is her ring). Lucia does so, but then the next day, it turns out that fortune teller was a fake. Lucia goes into the sea to retrieve her ring. She is almost captured by Lady Bat (who was the fortune teller) before Hanon and Rina arrive.
78	26	"Idol Debut"; Transliteration: "Aidoru Debyū" (Japanese: アイドルデビュー)	September 24, 2004
A man goes around looking for people to be idols. He asks Alala (who is in human form and accepts) and Rina. Rina (who is with Masahiro at the time) looks at the poster, before Masahiro grabs it out of her hands and rejects. When Masahiro sees Rina staring at a poster of Alala, who became a new idol, he thinks he ruined her dream of becoming an idol. The three mermaids end up at the concert and defeat Alala.
79	27	"Separated Sisters"; Transliteration: "Ketsuretsu no Shisutāzu" (Japanese: 決裂の姉妹(シスターズ))	October 2, 2004
After another loss at the hands of the Three Mermaid Princesses, the Black Beauty Sisters bicker at each other because of Fuku's comments. Mimi leaves Sheshe during their argument because Sheshe keeps on blaming their losses on her. Mimi meets and befriends Lucia, Hanon and Rina not knowing their identities. She tries to capture the mermaid princesses on her own, and fails, almost dying. Sheshe uses the new power given to them by Michel to heal Mimi, as she doesn't care if they get "kicked out" or not; she would rather die in the sea with her sister.
80	28	"Seira's Flower Garden"; Transliteration: "Seira no Hanazono" (Japanese: 星羅の花園)	October 9, 2004
Lucia's class takes a trip to a greenhouse, and she starts to brighten as Kaito sits beside her, much to Michal's dismay. Seira's spirit alerts Lucia, Hanon, and Rina of an impending danger. Kaito remembers Lucia's birthday from before.
81	29	"Gloom by a Triple-Threat"; Transliteration: "Mitsukai-tachi no Yūutsu" (Japanese: みつかいたちのゆううつ)	October 16, 2004
The Black Beauty Sisters, Lady Bat, Lanhua, and Alala hatch up plans to capture Hippo and use him as bait for the Mermaid Princesses.
82	30	"Embrace Me…"; Transliteration: "Dakishimete…" (Japanese: 抱きしめて…)	October 23, 2004
Rina learns how strong her feelings are for Masahiro, but she still cannot confess her feelings to him because of her identity. In the end, Masahiro swears he won't let Rina go no matter what, and the two finally confess their feelings and share a kiss.
83	31	"The Last Love Letter"; Transliteration: "Saigo no Rabu Retā" (Japanese: 最後の恋文(ラブレター))	October 30, 2004
Hanon begins to meet Nagisa more, but her feelings have become torn as she receives a letter from Taro Mitsuki, her former music teacher. Nagisa discovers this and invites Hanon to hang out with him the next day, but things soon take a turn when Lady Bat shows up at the place Hanon and Nagisa end up going to. Hanon chooses to stay with Nagisa, and she kisses him.
84	32	"Memories Vanished At Sea"; Transliteration: "Umi ni Kiete Kioku" (Japanese: 海に消えた記憶)	November 6, 2004
Lucia is slowly convinced that Kaito's memories have fully returned, as he experiences his time surfing. Michel however tries to make sure Kaito's previously lost memories remain lost. Kaito remembers what really happened back in Hawaii and vows to protect Lucia.
85	33	"Confused Heart"; Transliteration: "Madareru Kokoro" (Japanese: 乱れる心)	November 13, 2004
Lucia cherishes her reunion with Kaito. Meanwhile, Mimi becomes torn between duty and friendship as she slowly discovers her enemies' human identities.
86	34	"Temptations of a White Feather"; Transliteration: "Shiroi Hane no Yūwaku" (Japanese: 白い羽根の誘惑)	November 20, 2004
Michal becomes hysterical as Kaito leaves her for Lucia. A mysterious voice urges Michal to follow it.
87	35	"Instead of a Goodbye…"; Transliteration: "Sayonara no Kawari ni…" (Japanese: さよならのかわりに…)	November 27, 2004
Michal decides to "end her pain and sadness" by becoming one with Michel. Lucia, Hanon, Rina, and Kaito go to stop her, but they arrive too late. Lady Bat, Lanhua, and Alala team up to stop the mermaids, if only for a moment, but Aqua Regina appears and gives the trio a new song. The connection between Michal and Michel is revealed.
88	36	"The End of Despair"; Transliteration: "Setsubō no Hate" (Japanese: 絶望の果て)	December 4, 2004
Michel takes the three mermaids into his dimension and begins to fight them. Seira stops him with a song. Michel absorbs Lady Bat, Lanhua, and Alala, but not before the three villains reveal that Michel is just like them.
89	37	"To the Castle in the Sky…"; Transliteration: "Tenkū no Shiro e…" (Japanese: 天空の城へ…)	December 11, 2004
Without any villain attacks for a while, Lucia, Hanon, and Rina spend more time with their boyfriends as their relationships start to grow further. Caren, Noel, and Coco return. Meanwhile, Michel is told that his true self is a fossilized statue, reborn by "The Great One" and guided by Fuku. The six mermaids make their resolve to save Seira from Michel, but they are overpowered. Seira asks Lucia to break the statue that is Michel's true self. Kaito discovers Rihito is a descendant of the Pantharassa like himself.
90	38	"Battle on Christmas Eve"; Transliteration: "Seiya no Tatakai" (Japanese: 聖夜の戦い)	December 18, 2004
The six Mermaid Princesses, together with Rihito and Kaito, engage in a final battle with Michel. Seira is finally born, ready to fight with her voice. The Great One turns out to be Rihito and Michal's father; everything is explained, and the Great One destroys the statue that is Michel's true self. After that, Fuku reveals that he was created to control Michel, should anything go wrong; he does so, but the mermaids still sing a powerful song to defeat him. Aqua Regina makes an appearance, and their song gets through to Michel and Michal. The spirits of the original angels appear and invite Michel and Fuku to join them, which they happily accept. In the end, Aqua Regina gives a reborn Michal to Rihito.
91	39	"Onward to That Dream"; Transliteration: "Yume no Sono Saki e" (Japanese: 夢のその先へ)	December 25, 2004
With all things troubling themselves and the marine world out of the way, the seven Mermaid Princesses celebrate the newfound peace by organizing a little concert—one that becomes a huge reunion of characters from the entire series. Lucia and Kaito share their lovely time together once more in the end.
