= List of Boogiepop characters =

The Boogiepop series includes fourteen light novels, a live-action film, an anime, two manga, and several short stories. While most characters feature in multiple titles in the series, every new addition introduces many new characters. There are also only four key protagonists who feature in every title.

Japanese voice actors and voice actors for Boogiepop Phantom, as well as actors for Boogiepop and Others, are listed under the appropriate character. A list of all titles the character appears in is also present for each of the minor characters.

== Protagonists ==
Boogiepop (ブギーポップ, Bugīpoppu)

- Voiced by: Kaori Shimizu (Japanese); Angora Deb (English) (Boogiepop Phantom),
- Voiced by: Aoi Yūki (Japanese); Michelle Rojas (English) (Boogiepop and Others)
- Japanese actor: Sayaka Yoshino (Boogiepop and Others)

While many female students at Shinyo Academy whisper of a shinigami, few people know that Boogiepop actually exists. He is the alter-ego of Touka Miyashita. Normally dormant, Boogiepop rises to the surface to fight the enemies of the world when they appear. Boogiepop's appearance and voice are ambiguous: they seem both masculine and feminine at the same time. However, hidden beneath his signature black cloak and black, pipe-shaped hat, little is ever seen of him. Straight-faced and to the point, Boogiepop acts as mechanical as he claims to be. Boogiepop speaks in an archaic manner and seems fond of whistling Wagner's Die Meistersinger von Nürnberg. Boogiepop's name is explained in the series: "When I detect adversity approaching, I float to the surface. That's why I am Boogiepop – phantasmal, like bubbles."
The backstory, where Boogiepop first inhabits Miyashita as a child, is described in Boogiepop at Dawn. In Boogiepop and Others, Boogiepop holds vigil over Shinyo Academy. He establishes a meaningful friendship with Takeda Keiji, as they sat each day and spoke to each other, mainly about Boogiepop's nature, but also about personal topics from Takeda's life. After Manticore reveals itself and attacks Niitoki Kei, Boogiepop intervenes, using his microfilament wire so that Tanaka Shiro could finish it off. Manticore crosses Boogiepop's path again in Boogiepop Phantom in the form of his two residual aspects: Saotome Masami, who continues to be a direct threat, and Boogiepop Phantom, who seeks to protect highly evolved humans from the Towa Organisation. When strange incidents occur around Miyashita, Boogiepop tracks down Poom Poom and faces his creator, Kisaragi Manaka. Once Manaka loses her power, however, Boogiepop has no further interest in her death and protects her from Boogiepop Phantom. When Miyashita travels to Tokyo for her University entrance exam, Boogiepop arises and heads to Akihabara, where he corners and finally defeats Manticore. Boogiepop Returns: VS Imaginator Part 1 sees Boogiepop investigating the possible return of Imaginator, another one of Boogiepop's recurring foes, while being the target of the Towa Organisation. Using Anou Shinjirou as bait, Boogiepop lures out Spooky E and attempts to kill him, but the synthetic human manages to escape.
Boogiepop keeps minimal contact with other people and as such there are few who know much about him. While the paths of Boogiepop and Nagi Kirima tend to cross, as they both seek to protect the world, they have had little interaction. Their relationship is not a close one either, with Kirima resenting the way Boogiepop comes and goes as it is convenient. In Boogiepop Returns: VS Imaginator, we learn about Boogiepop's previous battle with Imaginator. Boogiepop has little further interaction with other characters until he meets with Anou Shinjirou, his lead to Spooky E.
Touka Miyashita (宮下藤花, Miyashita Tōka)

- Voiced by: Kaori Shimizu (Japanese); Angora Deb (English) (Boogiepop Phantom),
- Voiced by: Aoi Yūki (Japanese); Michelle Rojas (English) (Boogiepop and Others)
- Japanese actor: Sayaka Yoshino (Boogiepop and Others)

An ordinary, happy school girl at Shinyo Academy, Miyashita is in love with her boyfriend, Takeda Keiji, and close friends with Suema Kazuko. She finds it troublesome to deal with Niitoki Kei, partly because Niitoki has a crush on Takeda, but more so because Niitoki has met Boogiepop and as such knows both sides of the person. Not particularly good at school, she does not stand out in any way. Unknown to most, she was hospitalized as a child and this saw her life change, though even Miyashita herself does not seem to know the truth of what happened and was simply told that she had been possessed by a kitsune. Unknowingly, when the world is in trouble, she carries a Spalding sports bag containing the effects of Boogiepop, her alternate personality. She has no recollection of her time as Boogiepop and alters her memories to explain the blanks.
Nagi Kirima (霧間凪, Kirima Nagi)

- Voiced by: Yu Asakawa (Japanese); Rachael Lillis (English) (Boogiepop Phantom),
- Voiced by: Saori Ōnishi (Japanese); Morgan Garrett (English) (Boogiepop and Others)
- Japanese actor: Maya Kurosu (Boogiepop and Others)

Known as the Fire Witch to many, Kirima has few friends due to the way she distances herself from others: she knows that she is too dangerous for "normal" people to associate with. She lives with her stepbrother, Taniguchi Masaki, though he is unaware of her actions or lifestyle. She has a messiah complex and seeks to save the world from whatever may threaten it. Having lost her father, the famous writer Seiichi Kirima, and her first love when she was quite young, she seemingly lives both their lives in place of her own. Gifted both physically and intellectually, she has the tools she needs to carry out her self-appointed mission. The Towa Organization has given her the code name "Walpurgis" Varupurugizu (ヴァルプルギス).
Her backstory, where Kirima becomes a self-styled "hero of justice", is described in full detail in Boogiepop at Dawn. In Boogiepop and Others, Kirima's friend Naoko Kamikishiro requests her assistance with helping Echoes find Manticore and keep it from killing students at Shinyo Academy. Kirima agrees; she intentionally gets herself suspended from school, to gain the freedom to investigate. Following the trail of the drug, Type-S, Kirima comes to suspect that Manticore has taken the form of either Niitoki Kei, Saotome Masami or Tanaka Shiro. As Manticore attacks Echoes, Saotome slashes Kirima's throat, killing her. However, when Echoes turns into light to kill Manticore, he uses some of his power to resurrect Kirima. Kazuko Suema also attempts to draw close to Kirima during this time, despite her attempts to distance herself from everyone, which develops into an awkward friendship. In Boogiepop Phantom, she is investigating the aftermath of the "pillar of light" incident and the nature of the electromagnetic field around the city, seeking to stop the events that it causes. Her investigations reveal that Manticore is still alive, so she attempts to end matters with electromagnetic pulse blasts; Boogiepop Phantom intervenes to stop this plan. Her investigations ultimately lead her to Paisley Park, where Poom Poom and Manaka attempt to bring her to their side, but prove hostile when she resists. In the end, Boogiepop's intervention saves her. Even though they are both fighting for the same goals, Kirima dislikes Boogiepop.
Throughout her story, the main theme is how a childhood trauma can influence the growth of an individual. Nagi means "calm" or "lull". "After a storm comes a calm" is a Japanese proverb, which can also be translated as, "after a storm comes Nagi", referring to how she tends to resolve certain situations. The "kiri" in Kirima means "mist" and the "ma" means "space", "time" or "pause".
Kazuko Suema (末真和子, Suema Kazuko)

- Voiced by: Kyo Nagasawa (Japanese); Anne Benkovitz (English) (Boogiepop Phantom),
- Voiced by: Reina Kondō (Japanese); Natalie Hoover (English) (Boogiepop and Others)
- Japanese actor: Mami Shimizu (Boogiepop and Others)

Having once been marked as the next target of a serial killer, Suema develops an unusual interest and knowledge in criminal and abnormal psychology, as well as the desire to not let anything occur around her without her knowing. Suema struggles to find acceptance among her peers at Shinyo Academy. They look upon her as weird and exclude her, as a result of her unusual interests, though she is friends with Kinoshita Kyoko. In Boogiepop and Others, Suema first hears the rumours about Boogiepop, but dismisses them as fantasy, although she investigates a possible sighting of the shinigami. After seeing Nagi Kirima interrogate Kinoshita, Suema searches for Kirima's house and tries to learn what she can from her. She comes to learn that Kirima was involved with stopping the serial killer who had been stalking her, but was surprised to hear the claim that it was Boogiepop who saved her. Their relationship remains distant, despite Suema's efforts to change this. In Boogiepop Phantom, Suema meets Touka Miyashita for the first time and they quickly become close friends. She is relatively unaware of events as they unfold, and is entirely focused on studying for her University entrance exams with Miyashita. Suema appreciates how she is so unconditionally accepting of her and looks out for her friend. In Boogiepop Returns: VS Imaginator Part 1, we learn that Suema and Niitoki Kei are on friendly terms. Suema is approached by Kotoe Kinukawa, who seeks her help in regard to her relative, Jin Asukai. Suema investigates him and realises that something unusual is happening. After seeing a sketch of Suiko Minahoshi in Asukai's office, she goes to the place where Minahoshi had died, only to meet Aya Orihata for the first time and encourage her to take pleasure in life and fulfill her goals. Suema repeatedly just misses learning about what is really going on in the city. Throughout her story, the major theme is how a childhood trauma can influence the growth of an individual. Her backstory, where Suema was stalked by the serial killer, is described in full detail in Boogiepop at Dawn.

== Boogiepop and Others ==
Echoes (エコーズ, Ekōzu)

- Voiced by: Taiki Matsuno (Japanese); William Hirsh (English) (Boogiepop Phantom),
- Voiced by: Kōki Miyata (Japanese) (Japanese); David Matranga (English) (Boogiepop and Others)
- Japanese actor: Yasufumi Teriwaki (Boogiepop and Others)

An alien sent to Earth to evaluate humanity. When Echoes takes on human form to engage with human society, he inadvertently takes on a form more highly evolved than current humans. His knowledge is sealed away by restricting his ability to speak to only repeating the words used by others around him. This is why he is named Echoes, in reference to the Greek nymph, Echo. The names of many characters in the Boogiepop series are also references to Western music, particularly rock. Echoes is a song from the album Meddle by Pink Floyd. Sometime after coming to Earth, he was captured by the Towa Organization, who misinterpreted him as a mutant human and experimented on him, creating their synthetic humans from what they learned. They also attempted to clone Echoes, but their failed attempt resulted in the creation of the human-eating Manticore. When Manticore escaped from the lab in which it was created, Echoes gave chase. Boogiepop and Others begins with Echoes becoming disheartened in his search and disillusioned with humanity. As he collapses in the middle of the city, Boogiepop gives him the encouragement he needs and helps him when he is mistreated by the Police. He then meets Naoko Kamikishiro, with whom he shares a telepathic link. Kamikishiro learns about who he is, what he has been through and what he is trying to do. She shelters him at Shinyo Academy and calls for her friend, Nagi Kirima, to help. After Kamikishiro disappears, Kirima captures three students, believing that Manticore would be disguised as one of them, but Echoes senses that they are all ordinary humans. After he releases the students, one of them, Saotome Masami, stabs him through the throat with a poisoned mechanical pencil. With Echoes weakened, Manticore reveals itself, and attacks him. Echoes is unable to face Manticore and is bitterly defeated. When all hope seems lost, Echoes speaks his own words for the only time: "my body into information, transmit to source." At this, Echoes turns into a pillar of light that passes through his enemies, disintegrating Saotome Masami and mortally wounding Manticore. From Echoes' perspective, we are able to see how unjust prejudice is. He also demonstrates how insensitive modern society is to the unfortunate.
Boogiepop Phantom often references the pillar of light and, just like Echoes, Kisaragi Manaka speaks in repetition. Echoes makes a brief appearance at the end of the second-last episode.
Appearances: Boogiepop and Others, Boogiepop at Dawn, Boogiepop Phantom
Naoko Kamikishiro (紙木城直子, Kamikishiro Naoko)

- Voiced by: Ayaka Suwa (Japanese); Skyler McIntosh (English) (Boogiepop and Others)
- Japanese actor: Asumi Miwa

A third year student at Shinyo Academy who is going out with both Kimura Akio and Tanaka Shiro. Though known to be a kind, happy-go-lucky girl, she often sings Life is Brief. By chance, she finds Echoes collapsed in the street, and is compelled to help him. Despite his inability to communicate effectively via speech, Kamikishiro finds that she shares a telepathic link with him, and learns of Manticore. It is suggested that Kamikishiro saved humanity through the compassion she showed Echoes.
Appearances: Boogiepop and Others, Boogiepop at Dawn, Boogiepop Phantom
Akio Kimura (木村明雄, Kimura Akio)

- Japanese actor: Tetsu Sawaki

A second year student at Shinyo Academy, he finds himself in love with Kamikishiro Naoko.
Appearances: Boogiepop and Others
Kyouko Kinoshita (木下京子, Kinoshita Kyōko)

- Japanese actor: Takako Baba

A second year student at Shinyo Academy, Kinoshita is introduced to the drug Type-S by Kusatsu Akiko.
Appearances: Boogiepop and Others, Boogiepop Returns: VS Imaginator Part 2, Boogiepop Phantom
Seiichi Kirima (霧間誠一, Kirima Seiichi)
The father of Nagi, and a prolific writer, Kirima released several novels, but is best known for his works on psychology. His works are frequently referenced in the Boogiepop series, and also feature in the Jiken series. He received letters from espers which drew the attention of the Towa Organization who ordered Masanori Sasaki (Mo Murder) to kill him.
Akiko Kusatsu (草津秋子, Kusatsu Akiko)

- Japanese actor: Erika Kuroishi

A first year student at Shinyo Academy, Kusatsu has a crush on Saotome Masami.
Appearances: Boogiepop and Others
Kei Niitoki (新刻敬, Niitoki Kei)

- Voiced by: Shino Shimoji (Japanese); Jill Harris (English) (Boogiepop and Others)
- Japanese actor: Kai Hirohashi

A second year student at Shinyo Academy, Niitoki is the President of the Discipline Committee. Though she looks like a much younger girl, other students often come to her, seeking her assistance and treating her like an older sister.
Appearances: Boogiepop and Others, Boogiepop Returns: VS Imaginator Part 2, Boogiepop Overdrive: The King of Distortion
Masami Saotome (早乙女正美, Saotome Masami)

- Voiced by: Jun Fukuyama (Japanese); Crispin Freeman (English) (Boogiepop Phantom),
- Voiced by: Junya Enoki (Japanese); Stephen Fu (English) (Boogiepop and Others)
- Japanese actor: Hassei Takano

Saotome Masami is a first year student at Shinyo Academy with an unusual desire: he wishes to be killed by a woman stronger than himself. His advances on Kirima Nagi were rejected, but when he meets Manticore he professes his love, and seeks to help it conquer the world. Under his direction, Manticore takes the form of Yurihara Minako, and they experiment in controlling humans --- Type-S (S for Slave) results from this. The two fall deeply in love with each other.
Appearances: Boogiepop and Others, Boogiepop in the Mirror: "Pandora", Boogiepop Phantom
Keiji Takeda (竹田啓司, Takeda Keiji)

- Voiced by: Chiaki Kobayashi (Japanese); Matt Shipman (English) (Boogiepop and Others)
- Japanese actor: Daijiro Kawaoka

Takeda is a third year student at Shinyo Academy, with aspirations to become a designer. He is going out with Miyashita Touka, and becomes Boogiepop's first true friend.
Appearances: Boogiepop and Others, Boogiepop in the Mirror: "Pandora", Boogiepop Overdrive: The King of Distortion, Boogiepop Missing: Peppermint Wizard, Boogiepop Stacatto: Welcome to Jinx Shop, Boogiepop Phantom
Shiro Tanaka (田中志郎, Tanaka Shiro)

- Voiced by: Aoi Ichikawa (Japanese); Dallas Reid (English) (Boogiepop and Others)
- Japanese actor: Hideyuki Kawahara

A first year student at Shinyo Academy, and a member of the archery club. Tanaka is pursued by Naoko Kamikishiro, who professes her love for him. Though initially reluctant, he eventually goes out with her. After Naoko dies, the guilt Shiro felt triggered his evolution and gave birth to the King of Distortion inside him.
Appearances: Boogiepop and Others, Boogiepop Overdrive: The King of Distortion
Masaki Taniguchi (谷口正樹, Taniguchi Masaki)

- Voiced by: Taku Yashiro (Japanese); Christopher Llewyn Ramirez (English) (Boogiepop and Others)

A third-year middle school student, and the step-brother of Kirima Nagi, Taniguchi recently returned to Japan from Phnom Penh, and is currently living with his step-sister.
Appearances: Boogiepop and Others, Boogiepop Returns: VS Imaginator, Boogiepop Countdown Embryo: Erosion, Boogiepop Wicked Embryo: Eruption, Boogiepop Bounding: Lost Moebius
Minako Yurihara (百合川美奈子, Yurihawa Minako) / Manticore (マンティコア, Manteikoa)

- Voiced by: Mayumi Asano (Japanese); Simone Grant (English) (Boogiepop Phantom),
- Voiced by: Ayana Taketatsu (Japanese); Trina Nishimura (English)(Boogiepop and Others)
- Japanese actor: Ayana Sakai (Boogiepop and Others)

Minako was a second year student at Shinyo Academy, until she was consumed by Manticore, an imperfect clone of Echoes created by the Towa Organization who was considered a monster. It escaped from the lab it was created in, hoping to preserve its life. Minako started as a loner, so Manticore finds it easy to hide itself by interacting with as few people as possible. "Manticore" means "man-eater". The Manticore in Boogiepop and Others feeds on humans and gained its name after the Persian monster for this reason. Manticore initially aims only to survive and hide among human society. Saotome Masami, however, led it to believe in its own superiority. After killing Minako, Masami discovers Manticore, but before it can kill him, Saotome explains why Manticore would find Yurihara's form more beneficial and confesses his love to it. Listening to Saotome's logic, Manticore lets him live and help it, assuming the form of Yurihara to hide from its pursuer, Echoes, for whose superior power it held a deep-set fear. Believing itself safely hidden, Manticore managed to avoid conflict until it believed it had Echoes trapped, at which point it attacked him. As it begins to take on more human attributes, its motivations shift towards love. Seeking to align himself with Manticore, Saotome inquires to what other powers it possesses and gleefully explains how these powers could be used to control the world. When Manticore tells Saotome of its powers, he initiates experiments in controlling humans. As they work together, the two fall deeply in love with each other. Despite their initial success enslaving Akiko Kusatsu, repeated failures with the Type-S drug wear heavily upon Manticore. As Kirima Nagi draws close to them with her investigations, Manticore finds itself pushed into a corner. At this point Naoko Kamikishiro stumbles across Manticore and Saotome, looking for Echoes. Manticore kills Kamikishiro and Saotome devises a plan that would free Manticore from its past. He manages to stab Echoes with a mechanical pencil filled with Manticore's poison. Its greatest opponent now weakened, Manticore reveals itself and attacks. About to lose, Echoes transforms himself into light, directing the beam towards Manticore to destroy it. Manticore is saved by Saotome, who is disintegrated. It suffers severe burns to half its body. After losing Saotome, the only tie it had to humanity, it reverted to being a monster. Seeking to use Kei Niitoki as a means to restore itself, Manticore chases her, but is captured by a wire. Boogiepop reveals himself, and tells Shiro Tanaka to shoot an arrow through Manticore's head, finishing it off.
In Boogiepop Phantom, remnants of Manticore survived the pillar of light through the electromagnetic field surrounding the city, though the fragments split in two. One part maintained the basic form of Yurihara, but took on the cloak and hat of Boogiepop to become Boogiepop Phantom; the other took the form of Saotome, and survived as Manticore Phantom. Boogiepop Phantom became aware that it would only exist for a short time and used this time to protect the "special children", ones who had evolved after Echoes became the pillar of light. It searches for evolved humans and preserves those it finds under the city, until the day when humanity catches up with them. It chooses, however, to avoid significant exchange with Nagi Kirima and Boogiepop. It also sees Manaka as a threat, but when it tries to kill her, Boogiepop intervenes, explaining that she has lost her powers. Manticore Phantom cares only about its own survival and continues to devour people in the city. After meeting Arito Misuzu, Manticore Phantom attempts to use her as a pawn to draw more food to itself. It also uses Kishida Ichirou in a similar manner, though while it revealed itself to Misuzu, Kishida remained unaware of Manticore Phantom and of what it had used his body to do. It then sees a chance to get revenge on Kirima, whom it still sees as an enemy, but Boogiepop Phantom intervenes before Kirima arrives. When made aware of its limited life-span, Manticore Phantom panics and enters the body of Ichirou Kishida, another "phantom" living through the electromagnetic field, and travels to Akihabara, a place with sufficient electromagnetic activity to maintain its existence. Manticore Phantom hides there for a year, devouring people in Tokyo, but Boogiepop finds it. Boogiepop destroys Kishida and Manticore Phantom with an electromagnetic pulse blast. In Boogiepop Returns: VS Imaginator Part 1, Boogiepop compares Spooky E with Manticore, claiming the Manticore is the stronger.
Manticore demonstrates the stark contrast between a person treated as an object or as a failure, and a person given love. Minako's name derives from a character from the song and album Tarkus by the band Emerson, Lake & Palmer.
Appearances: Boogiepop and Others, Boogiepop Phantom

== Boogiepop Returns: VS Imaginator ==
Suiko Minahoshi (水乃星透子, Minahoshi Suiko) / Imaginator (イマジネーター, Imajinētā)

- Voiced by: Kana Hanazawa (Japanese); Bryn Apprill (English) (Boogiepop and Others)

A girl who was assumed to have leapt from the roof of Shinyo Academy, she was actually a being known as Imaginator and has fought against Boogiepop. She possesses the ability "Strange Days" Sutorenji Deizu (ストレンジ・デイズ)
Appearances: Boogiepop Returns: VS Imaginator, Boogiepop at Dawn, Boogiepop Paradox: Heartless Red, Beat's Discipline, VS Imaginator Part IV "The Night Watch under The Cold Moon" (Night Watch trilogy), Spectral Speculation of Soul-Drop (Soul Drop series), Controversy about Iron Mask (Night Watch trilogy)

Shinjirō Anō (安能慎二郎, Anō Shinjirō)

- Voiced by: Yoshiaki Hasegawa (Japanese); Orion Pitts (English) (Boogiepop and Others)

Anou is a third year Middle School student. When Taniguchi Masaki changes to his school, Anou finds himself confused by his feelings towards the boy, so directs his frustrations towards him.
Appearances: Boogiepop Returns: VS Imaginator, Boogiepop Phantom

Jin Asukai (飛鳥井仁, Ausukai Jin)

- Voiced by: Yoshimasa Hosoya (Japanese); Mike McFarland (English) (Boogiepop and Others)

An art teacher and councilor at a cram school, Asukai makes the students feel better by telling them what they want to hear. He is able to see people's hearts in the form of plants growing from their chests, and the flaws of their hearts are represented by something missing from the plant.
Appearances: Boogiepop Returns: VS Imaginator, Boogiepop Missing: Peppermint Wizard, Beat's Discipline

Kotoe Kinukawa (衣川琴絵, Kinukawa Kotoe)

- Voiced by: Kana Asumi (Japanese); Mallorie Rodak (English) (Boogiepop and Others)

A relative of Asukai Jin.
Appearances: Boogiepop Returns: VS Imaginator

Aya Orihata (織機綺, Orihata Aya) / Camille (カミール, Kamīru)

- Voiced by: Kana Ichinose (Japanese); Jad Saxton (English) (Boogiepop and Others)

Orihata appears to be an ordinary Middle School student, but she is actually a synthetic human from the Towa Organisation, working under Spooky E. Her original mission was to experiment with interbreeding between humans and synthetic humans, but after she meets, and falls in love with, Taniguchi Masaki, her focus shifts to finding Boogiepop. Her name is a reference to the musician Prince's claim of having a 'good' personality named Camille.
Appearances: Boogiepop Returns: VS Imaginator, Boogiepop at Dawn, Boogiepop Countdown Embryo: Erosion, Boogiepop Wicked Embryo: Eruption, Boogiepop Bounding: Lost Moebius

Spooky E (スプーキーE, Supūkī E)

- Voiced by: Jouji Nakata (Japanese); Christopher Nicholas (English) (Boogiepop Phantom),
- Voiced by: Yōji Ueda (Japanese); Chris Rager (English) (Boogiepop and Others)

Correctly known as Spooky Electric (スプーキーエレクトリック, Supūkī Erekutorikku), Spooky E is a synthetic human from the Towa Organization. Spooky E has the ability to generate electricity from his body, and is able to control the minds of humans with this power. Initially sent to investigate what became of Echoes and the result of the pillar of light, his mission changes to finding Boogiepop. His name also derives from Prince claiming to have a 'bad' personality named Spooky Electric.
Appearances: Boogiepop Returns: VS Imaginator, Boogiepop in the Mirror: "Pandora", Boogiepop Missing: Peppermint Wizard, Boogiepop Countdown Embryo: Erosion, Boogiepop Phantom, Beat's Discipline

Gen Sakakibara (榊原弦, Sakakibara Gen)
Seiichi Kirima's best friend, a writer and martial arts master that taught both Nagi and Masaki.
Appearances: Boogiepop Returns: VS Imaginator, Boogiepop in the Mirror: "Pandora", Boogiepop Countdown Embryo: Erosion

== Boogiepop in the Mirror: "Pandora" ==
Mitsuo Kazumiya (数宮三都雄, Kazumiya Mitsuo)
Appearances: Boogiepop in the Mirror: "Pandora"
Kito (キト, Kito)
Appearances: Boogiepop in the Mirror: "Pandora"
Kouji Koumoto (神元功志, Kōmoto Kōji)
Possesses the ability "Whispering" Uisuparingu (ウィスパリング)
Appearances: Boogiepop in the Mirror: "Pandora"
Kasumi Mikage (海影香純, Mikage Kasumi)
Appearances: Boogiepop in the Mirror: "Pandora"
Kyoko Nanase (七音恭子, Nanase Kyoko)
Possesses the ability "Aroma" Aroma (アロマ)
Appearances: Boogiepop in the Mirror: "Pandora"
Yuu Tenjiki (天色優, Tenjiki Yū) / Eugene (ユージン, Yūjin)
Appearances: Boogiepop in the Mirror: "Pandora", Boogiepop Overdrive: The King of Distortion
Nozomi Tsuki (辻希美, Tsuki Nozomi)
Possesses the ability "Automatic" Ōtomateikku (オートマティック)
Appearances: Boogiepop in the Mirror: "Pandora", Boogiepop Paradox: Heartless Red
Kentarou Habara (羽原健太郎, Kentarō Habara)

- Voiced by: Yuji Murai (Japanese); Eric Vale (English) (Boogiepop and Others)

Appearances: Boogiepop in the Mirror: "Pandora", Boogiepop Overdrive: The King of Distortion, Boogiepop at Dawn, Boogiepop Wicked Embryo: Eruption

== Boogiepop Overdrive: The King of Distortion ==
King of Distortion (歪曲王, Waikyokuō)
Appearances: Boogiepop Overdrive: The King of Distortion
Kyōichiro Teratsuki (寺月恭一郎, Teratsuki Kyōichiro)

- Voiced by: Tōru Ōkawa (Japanese); Christopher Wehkamp (English) (Boogiepop and Others)

Appearances: Boogiepop Overdrive: The King of Distortion, Boogiepop Missing: Peppermint Wizard, Phantasm Phenomenon of Memoria-Noise (Soul Drop series)
Zouragi (ゾーラギ, Zōragi)
Appearances: Boogiepop Overdrive: The King of Distortion
Shizuka Hashizaka (橋坂静香, Hashizaka Shizuka)

- Voiced by: Riho Sugiyama (Japanese); Tabitha Ray (English) (Boogiepop and Others)

Appearances: Boogiepop Overdrive: The King of Distortion
Makoto Hashizaka (橋坂真, Hashizaka Makoto)

- Voiced by: Ami Naitō (Japanese); Alison Viktorin (English) (Boogiepop and Others)

Appearances: Boogiepop Overdrive: The King of Distortion
Yuzuru Shinozaki (篠崎譲, Shinozaki Yuzuru)
Appearances: Boogiepop Overdrive: The King of Distortion

== Boogiepop at Dawn ==
Makiko Kisugi (来生真希子, Kisugi Makiko) / Fear Ghoul (フィア・グール, Fea Gūru)
Voiced by: Sayaka Kinoshita (Japanese); Lydia Mackay (English) (Boogiepop and Others)
A young female doctor who discovers a Towa Organization 'evolution-drug' by accident and begins experimentations.
Appearances: Boogiepop at Dawn, Boogiepop Phantom
Shinpei Kuroda (黒田慎平, Kuroda Shinpei) / Scarecrow (スケアクロウ, Sukeakurō) / Kishida Ichirou (岸田一朗, Kishida Ichirō)
Voiced by: Atsushi Miyauchi (Japanese); J. Michael Tatum (English) (Boogiepop and Others)
A Towa Organization agent using the cover of being a detective who is tasked to search for MPLS and humans who might be 'over-evolved'. Meets and befriends a young Kirima Nagi. He is killed by Sasaki Masanori after stealing drugs from Towa and administering them to Nagi to halt her evolutionary process so she could survive. His name is an allusion to the song "The Scarecrow" by Pink Floyd from their 1967 debut album The Piper at the Gates of Dawn
Appearances: Boogiepop at Dawn, Boogiepop Phantom
Pigeon (ピジョン, Pijyon)
Voiced by: Ai Kakuma (Japanese); Sarah Wiedenheft (English) (Boogiepop and Others)
A Towa Organization agent who delivers messages to other agents. She is in love with Shinpei Kuroda.
Appearances: Boogiepop at Dawn
Masanori Sasaki (佐々木政則, Sasaki Masanori) / Mo Murder (モ・マーダー, Mo Mādā)
Voiced by: Shūhei Sakaguchi (Japanese); Aaron Roberts (English) (Boogiepop and Others)
One of the Towa Organization's agents top assassins. Guised as an ordinary businessman under the name of Masanori Sasaki. The name Mo Murder is a song by Krayzie Bone.
Appearances: Boogiepop at Dawn, Boogiepop Countdown Embryo: Erosion, Beat's Discipline, Boogiepop Phantom
Chikao Shinokita (篠北周夫, Shinokita Chikao)
Voiced by: Shinnosuke Musashi (Japanese); Daman Mills (English) (Boogiepop and Others)
Appearances: Boogiepop at Dawn, Beat's Discipline

== Boogiepop Missing: Peppermint Wizard ==
Captain Walker (キャプテン・ウォーカー, Kyaputen Uōkā)
His name derives from the character Captain Walker from the rock opera Tommy; it is also the name of a song from the Tommy soundtrack.
Appearances: Boogiepop Missing: Peppermint Wizard
Tosuke Kigawa (軌川十助, Kigawa Tosuke) / The Peppermint Wizard (ペパーミントの魔術師, pepāminto no majutsushi)
A young man with green skin and an incredible talent for making ice cream. He is able to physically feel the emotional pain that other people feel. Based on that feeling, he give people ice cream that may best ease that pain.
He was kept in the basement of Norisuke Kigawa's estate until Norisuke died. Afterwards, Teratsuki Kyouichirou discovered him, and helped him make his own ice cream company under the MCE brand.
Appearances: Boogiepop Missing: Peppermint Wizard
Rei Kusunoki (楠木玲, Kusunoki Rei)
Appearances: Boogiepop Missing: Peppermint Wizard
Suguru Semigasawa (蝉ヶ沢卓, Semigasawa Suguru) / Squeeze (スクイーズ, Sukuīzu)
Named after Squeeze, an album released by The Velvet Underground in 1973.
Appearances: Boogiepop Missing: Peppermint Wizard, Boogiepop Paradox: Heartless Red

== Boogiepop Embryo ==
Akiko Honami (穂波顕子, Honami Akiko)
Possesses the ability "Strange Days" Sutorenji Deizu (ストレンジ・デイズ) which is a reference to the album and title track Strange Days by The Doors.
Appearances: Boogiepop Countdown Embryo: Erosion, Boogiepop Wicked Embryo: Eruption, Boogiepop Paradox: Heartless Red
Hiroshi Honami (穂波弘, Honami Hiroshi)
Possesses the ability "Tightrope" Taitorōpu (タイトロープ), an allusion to the song "Tightrope" by the band Electric Light Orchestra.
Appearances: Boogiepop Countdown Embryo: Erosion, Boogiepop Wicked Embryo: Eruption
Pearl (パール, Pāru)
Name is an allusion to 1971 album Pearl by Janis Joplin.
Appearances: Boogiepop Countdown Embryo: Erosion, Boogiepop Wicked Embryo: Eruption, Beat's Discipline
Lee Maisaka (リィ舞阪, Rī Maisaka) / Fortissimo (フォルテッシモ, Foruteshimo)
Possesses the ability "The Slider" Za Suraidā (ザ・スライダー) which is a reference to The Slider, an album by the British band T.Rex. The name might be a reference to Fortissimo as a musical term, but it also is the name of an album released by Japanese group Kryzler & Kompany in 2001.
Appearances: Boogiepop Countdown Embryo: Erosion, Boogiepop Wicked Embryo: Eruption, Beat's Discipline
Sidewinder (サイドワインダー, Saidowaindā)
Name could be an allusion to the jazz album The Sidewinder.
Appearances: Boogiepop Countdown Embryo: Erosion, Boogiepop Wicked Embryo: Eruption
Tohru Takashiro (高代亨, Takashiro Tōru) / Inazuma (イナズマ, Inazuma)
Appearances: Boogiepop Countdown Embryo: Erosion, Boogiepop Wicked Embryo: Eruption, Beat's Discipline
The Embryo (ジ・エンブリオ, Ji Enburio)
His name might reference Embryo as the name of the German progressive rock band, but Embryo was a song on Works, an album released by Pink Floyd in 1983 and was also a song on the album Master of Reality, released by Black Sabbath in 1971.
Appearances: Boogiepop Countdown Embryo: Erosion, Boogiepop Wicked Embryo: Eruption, Beat's Discipline
Kazami Segawa (瀬川風見, Segawa Kazami) / Swallow Bird (スワロゥバード, Suwarō Bādo)
Appearances: Boogiepop Wicked Embryo: Eruption, Beat's Discipline
Sanpei Motoki (本木三平, Motoki Sanpei)
Possesses the ability "Countdown" Kauntodaun (カウントダウン) named after the song "Countdown" by the band Rush
Appearances: Boogiepop Countdown Embryo: Erosion

== Boogiepop Paradox: Heartless Red ==
Akemi Kurenai (九連内朱巳, Kurenai Akemi) / Rains on Friday (レイン・オン・フライディ, Rein on Furaidei)
Appearances: Boogiepop Paradox: Heartless Red, Beat's Discipline
Chizuru Kurenai (九連内千鶴, Kurenai Chizuru) / Mrs. Robinson (ミセス・ロビンソン, Misesu Robunson)
Trivia: "Mrs. Robinson" is the famous song by Simon & Garfunkel from 1967.
Appearances: Boogiepop Paradox: Heartless Red
Morito Uchimura (内村杜斗, Uchimura Morito) / Fail Safe (フェイルセイフ, Feiru Seifu)
Appearances: Boogiepop Paradox: Heartless Red

== Boogiepop Unbalance: Holy & Ghost ==
Doctor (ドクター, Dokutā)
Appearances: Boogiepop Unbalance: Holy & Ghost
Pete Beat (ピート・ビート, Pīto Bīto)
Trivia: Beat is an album released by King Crimson in 1982.
Appearances: Boogiepop Unbalance: Holy & Ghost, Beat's Discipline
Slim Shape (スリム・シェイプ, Surimu Sheipu)
Appearances: Boogiepop Unbalance: Holy & Ghost
Seiko Hamada (濱田聖子, Hamada Seiko) / Holy (ホーリィ, Hōrī)
Appearances: Boogiepop Unbalance: Holy & Ghost
Reiji Yuuki (結城玲治, Yūki Reiji) / Ghost (ゴースト, Gōsuto)
Appearances: Boogiepop Unbalance: Holy & Ghost
Mitsugu Ujiki (宇治木貢, Ujiki Mitsugu)
Appearances: Boogiepop Unbalance: Holy & Ghost
Setsuko Amamiya (雨宮世津子, Amamiya Setsuko) / Reset (リセット, Risetto)
Possesses the ability "Moby Dick" Mobī Dikku (モービィ・ディック)
Trivia: "Moby Dick" is a song from the 1969 album Led Zeppelin II
Appearances: Boogiepop Unbalance: Holy & Ghost, Beat's Discipline, Ginyōriai Castle, Boogiepop Intolerance: The Ark of Orpheus

== Boogiepop Stacatto: Welcome to Jinx Shop ==
Hiiragi (柊, Hīragi) / Oxygen (オキシジェン, Okishijen)
Appearances: Boogiepop Stacatto: Welcome to Jinx Shop, Beat's Discipline
Kaleidoscope (カレイドスコープ, Kareidosukōpu)
Appearances: Boogiepop Stacatto: Welcome to Jinx Shop, Beat's Discipline
Narasaki Fujiko (楢崎不二子, Narasaki Fujiko)
Appearances: Boogiepop Stacatto: Welcome to Jinx Shop, Spectral Speculation of Soul-Drop (Soul Drop series)
Shouzou Itouya (伊東谷抄造, Itōya Shōzō) / Shame Face (シェイムフェイス, Sheimu Feisu)
Appearances: Boogiepop Stacatto: Welcome to Jinx Shop
Masanori Sumiya (澄矢雅典, Sumiya Masanori) / White Riot (ホワイトライアット, Howaito Raiatto)
Trivia: "White Riot" is a single released by The Clash in 1977.
Appearances: Boogiepop Stacatto: Welcome to Jinx Shop
Ai Komiyama (小宮山愛, Komiyama Ai) / Switch Stance (スイッチスタンス, Suichi Sutansu)
Appearances: Boogiepop Stacatto: Welcome to Jinx Shop
Kimika Nakamura (仲村紀美香, Nakamura Kimika) / Gimme Shelter (ギミー・シェルター, Gimī Sherutā)
Trivia: "Gimme Shelter" is a song from the album Let It Bleed, released by The Rolling Stones in 1969.
Appearances: Boogiepop Stacatto: Welcome to Jinx Shop

== Boogiepop Bounding: Lost Moebius ==
Brick (ブリック, Burikku)
Trivia: "Brick" is a song from the album Whatever and Ever Amen, released by Ben Folds Five in 1997.
Appearances: Boogiepop Bounding: Lost Moebius
Akira Aoi (蒼衣秋良, Aoi Akira) / Cold Medicine (コールドメディシン, Kōrudo Medeishin)
Appearances: Boogiepop Bounding: Lost Moebius, Boogiepop Intolerance: The Ark of Orpheus
Mitsuko Amamiya (雨宮美津子, Amamiya Mitsuko) / Limit (リミット, Rimitto)
Appearances: Boogiepop Bounding: Lost Moebius
Kyousuke Hasebe (長谷部京輔, Hasebe Kyōsuke) / Idiotic (イディオティック, Ideiotikku)
Appearances: Boogiepop Bounding: Lost Moebius

== Boogiepop Intolerance: The Ark of Orpheus ==
Sadao Suma (須磨貞夫, Suma Sadao)
Appearances: Boogiepop Intolerance: The Ark of Orpheus
Harumi Suginoura (杉乃浦春海, Suginōra Harumi) / One Hot Minute (ワン・ホット・ミニット, Wan Hoto Minitto)
Trivia: One Hot Minute is an album released by Red Hot Chili Peppers in 1995.
Appearances: Boogiepop Intolerance: The Ark of Orpheus
Yasuko Aikawa (相川靖子, Aikawa Yasuko) / Tear Jerker (ティアジャーカー, Tia Jākā)
Possesses the ability "Treason Reason" Torīzun Rīzun (トリーズン・リーズン)
Appearances: Boogiepop Intolerance: The Ark of Orpheus
Heizou Rokumine (六嶺平蔵, Rokumine Heizō)
Appearances: Boogiepop Intolerance: The Ark of Orpheus
Midori Rokumine (六嶺美登里, Rokumine Midori) / Fallen Grace (フォーリン・グレイス, Fōrin Gureisu)
Trivia: "Fallen Grace" is a song from the album The Whispered Lies of Angels, released by Undying in 2000.
Appearances: Boogiepop Intolerance: The Ark of Orpheus

== Boogiepop Phantom ==
Boogiepop Phantom (ブギーポップ・ファントム, Bugīpoppu Fantomu)

- Voiced by: Mayumi Asano (Japanese); Simone Grant (English)

When Manticore was defeated by Echoes, its remnants survived in the electromagnetic field surrounding the city. One half of Manticore continued to use the basic appearance of Yurihara Minako, but also imitated the cloak and hat of Boogiepop: it calls itself Boogiepop Phantom. Boogiepop Phantom protects the "special children" by preserving them beneath the city, until such time as the world is ready for them.
Manticore Phantom (マンティコア・ファントム, Manteikoa Fantomu)

- Voiced by: Jun Fukuyama (Japanese); Crispin Freeman (English)

When Manticore was defeated by Echoes, its remnants survived in the electromagnetic field surrounding the city. One half of Manticore took the form of Saotome Masami, and continues to devour people in the city.
Poom Poom (プームプーム, Pūmu Pūmu)

- Voiced by: Rakuto Tochihara (Japanese); Jessica Calvello (English)

Poom Poom was created by Manaka Kisaragi. Originally he was born from the memories of Mamoru Oikawa, but later evolved into the Poom Poom of Akane Kojima's creation. By handing out balloons to people holding regret about the direction their lives have taken, he separates their childhood hopes and dreams from them, which play with him in Paisley Park, leaving only an empty shell behind.
Trivia: "Poom Poom" is a song from the album Crystal Ball, released by Prince in 1998.
Misuzu Arito (有藤美鈴, Arifuji Misuzu)

- Voiced by: Megumi Nasu (Japanese); Megan Hollingshead (English)

Called Panaru at school, Misuzu teaches people about accepting the world for what it is, and loving it nonetheless. However, Misuzu has repressed her memories of the truth: she had found the corpse of her best friend, Megumi Toyama, five years ago. Unable to accept this, she tried to repress the memories by living Megumi's life and soon becomes allies with Manticore Phantom under the pretense of her spreading of Panuru's worldview, a ruse for Manticore killing humans.
Hisashi Jonouchi (城之内久志, Jonōchi Hisashi)

- Voiced by: Shizuma Hodoshima (Japanese); Corey Marshall (English)

Jonouchi wanted to be a hero, but when he spent a year in hospital due to a bone tumour, he had all but given up. Dr Kisugi offered him a drug to help realise his dream, but it did not seem to have an effect. On the night the pillar of light pierced the sky, something happened to Jonouchi. When he sees his father the next morning, there appears to be a "bug" over his chest; looking at other people as he goes to school, many people seem to have these "bugs". As an experiment, Jonouchi removes and eats a bug from a fellow student, and seems to lift all regret from them.
Manaka Kisaragi (如月真名花, Kisaragi Manaka)

- Voiced by: Sanae Kobayashi (Japanese); Rachael Lillis (English)

A highly evolved human, Manaka grew at an unnatural rate, and had the ability to draw memories from her surroundings in the form of butterflies of light. As her grandmother grows old and weak, she kills Manaka before she herself died – not wishing for "the devil's child" to be left free. When the pillar of light pierced the sky that same night, Echoes inadvertently revived Manaka. Soon after, her grandmother died, and Manaka was free to go out into the world. By drawing memories from everywhere, she learns everything there is to know in the world; she even learns about Echoes, and begins repeating back the words she hears others speak, similar to how he had.
Mayumi Kisaragi (如月真弓, Kisaragi Mayumi)

- Voiced by: Fumiko Osaka (Japanese); Traci Shannon (English)

When Mayumi was pregnant, she would do anything for her unborn child. When Dr Kisugi offered a drug to ensure she gave birth to a strong child, she took it. When she finally gave birth to Manaka, something happened to Mayumi's mind: while she could still remember everything from before she gave birth, she was unable to make new memories after this point.
Akane Kojima (小島茜, Kojima Akane)

- Voiced by: Miwa Yasuda (Japanese); Megan Hollingshead (English)

More than anything else, Akane wants to write children's books for a living. When an advisor at the school tells her to give up her dream and pursue a science-based stream, she gives up her dreams. She destroys her works, including the story of Poom Poom.
Officer Morita (森田巡査, Morita Junsa) / Snake Eye (スネークアイ, Sunēku Ai)

- Voiced by: Hisao Egawa (Japanese); David Brimmer (English)

Morita was a police officer, but he was at some point killed by the synthetic human named Snake Eye, who assumed Morita's identity. Snake Eye has the ability to move any part of his body in the manner of a snake, and control the minds of humans who meet his gaze. He monitors the city for evolved humans, and kills those he finds.
Trivia: "Snake Eye" is a single released by AC/DC in 1998.
Mamoru Oikawa (及川鎮, Oikawa Mamoru)

- Voiced by: Hiroyuki Yoshino (Japanese); Steve Bednarz (English)

Though a kind child, and highly protective of his sister, Sayoko, Mamoru begins to change after his father fails to fulfill a promise with him. As his father's business goes bankrupt, he begins to obsess about "useless things". After a pillar of light pierces the sky, Mamoru believes he has gained the ability to destroy these useless things, but the truth is that he can only choose what is to be destroyed.
Sayoko Oikawa (及川小夜子, Oikawa Sayoko)

- Voiced by: Kei Kobayashi (Japanese); Debora Rabbai (English)

Mamoru's younger sister, Sayoko has cared deeply about her brother ever since he saved her when they were young children. Even as he turns obsessive about "useless things", and abusive towards her, she never gives up on her brother. After the pillar of light pierces the sky, Sayako unknowingly gained the ability to destroy whatever her brother desires.
Yoko Sasaoka (笹岡陽子, Sasaoka Yoko)

- Voiced by: Sakeo Chiba (Japanese); Kelli Shayne Butler (English)

A student in Nagi's class who cheated on a math test to get a high score. She is the first person on whose guilt Jonouchi tested his power. However, she lapses back to cheating and later meets with Misuzu Arito, whom she admires for her seeming tranquility.
Yoji Suganuma (菅沼洋次, Suganuma Yōji)

- Voiced by: Hirofumi Nojima (Japanese); Liam O'Brien (English)

Yoji's father has high expectations for him, but he only wishes to study computer graphics and make games. He becomes obsessive about a virtual girlfriend he created, but after meeting Rie Sato, he begins to blur the line between reality and fiction, and believes she is his virtual girlfriend. Through abuse of the drug, Type-S, Yoji becomes more confused as his mind degenerates.
Yasuko Suzuki (鈴木康子, Suzuki Yasuko)

- Voiced by: Yuki Watanabe (Japanese); Lea Lane (English)

A close friend of Moto Tonomura, Yasuko had gone out with Saotome Masami back in middle school, but dumped him when she became more outgoing.
Yoshiki Tabata (田畑良樹, Tabata Yoshiki)

- Voiced by: Yoshifumi Ichiishi (Japanese); Buddy Woodward (English)

Yoshiki was oblivious to the true feelings of those around him until after the pillar of light pierced the sky. He gained the ability to hear people's thoughts, and learns what they really think of him.
Moto Tonomura (殿村望都, Tonomura Moto)

- Voiced by: Mamiko Noto (Japanese); Jessica Calvello (English)

A shy girl with obsessive compulsive habits, Moto rejects men, but harbours an old crush towards Saotome Masami. She never told Saotome her feelings because he had gone out with her friend, Yasuko Suzuki.
Megumi Toyama (遠山恵, Toyama Megumi)

- Voiced by: Tsugumi Higasayama (Japanese); Kristen Nelson (English)

Called Panaru by her friend, Misuzu Arito, Megumi was one of the victims of the serial killer, Fear Ghoul.
Sachiko Wakasa (若狭幸子, Wakasa Sachiko)

- Voiced by: Tomoko Miyadera (Japanese); Meg Francis (English)

Mother of Shizue, her relationship with her daughter became distant after her husband died. When Shizue caught her with another man, she misinterpreted the situation, and ended their relationship.
Shizue Wakasa (若狭静枝, Wakasa Shizue)

- Voiced by: Nobuko Kotani (Japanese); Lea Lane (English)

Daughter of Sachiko, she draws distant from her mother after her father died. Seeing her mother with another man, she comes to believe that Sachiko had not truly loved her father, and becomes disgusted with her own mother. She also becomes disgusted at the thought of sexual relations, to the point of physical illness. She seeks the assistance of Dr Kisugi to overcome her troubles.
Officer Yamamoto (山本巡査, Yamamoto Junsa)

- Voiced by: Sotarou Kobayashi (Japanese), Bill Rogers (English)

A police officer, and friend of Officer Morita. Every time Officer Yamamoto learns anything about what is happening in the city, Snake Eye erases that portion of his memories.
Saki Yoshizawa (吉沢早紀, Yoshizawa Saki)

- Voiced by: Fumiko Orikasa (Japanese) Lisa Ortiz (English)

A bright and popular girl, Saki has loved to play the piano since she was a child, and her parents sacrificed everything to fulfill her dream.

== Boogiepop Dual ==
See Boogiepop Dual: Characters

== See also ==
- List of Boogiepop media
