= Himawari! =

Japanese anime television series

ひまわりっ!
- Manga

Himawari-den!
- Written by: GoDo
- Illustrated by: Tagro
- Published by: Hakusensha
- Magazine: Young Animal Arashi
- Original run: March 7, 2006 – December 7, 2006
- Volumes: 1
- Anime television series
- Directed by: Shigenori Kageyama
- Produced by: Kazuaki Morijiri; Yoshikazu Tochihira
- Written by: Mamiko Ikeda
- Music by: Takeshi Senoo; Kei Haneoka
- Studio: ARMS
- Licensed by: NA: Maiden Japan
- Original network: Chiba TV, Anime Network
- Original run: April 8, 2006 – July 1, 2006
- Episodes: 13
- Anime television series

Himawari Too!!
- Directed by: Shigenori Kageyama
- Produced by: Kazuaki Morijiri; Yoshikazu Tochihira
- Written by: Mamiko Ikeda
- Music by: Takeshi Senoo; Kei Haneoka
- Studio: ARMS
- Licensed by: NA: Maiden Japan
- Original network: Chiba TV, Anime Network
- Original run: January 6, 2007 – March 31, 2007
- Episodes: 13
- icon

Himawari! (ひまわりっ!; lit. "Sunflower!") is a Japanese anime series created by GoDo, directed by Shigenori Kageyama, and produced by Genco. It was aired on Chiba TV from April 8, 2006, to July 1, 2006, and afterwards got a second season, Himawari!! (ひまわりっ!!; read as Himawari Two), and a short manga to connect the two, Himawari-den! (ひまわり伝っ!).

== Plot ==
Kasumi Kogen, which translates to "The Village of Mist", is a town somewhere in rural Japan. In this town there is a school, the Shinobi Gakuen, where competent female students gather from all over Japan and train to become kunoichi (female ninja). The people of Kasumi Kogen are alumni of the school, and they run and jump and disappear as if the whole town were a big ninja house.

The story begins as a girl, Himawari Hinata, arrives in Kasumi Kogen. She has transferred to Shinobi Gakuen to train under Ichikawa Raiso and fulfill a dream of becoming a kunoichi that she has fostered since she was saved by one in her childhood. On her first day, she meets Hayato Marikoji, a teacher who is himself just arriving at Shinobi Gakuen, and he saves her life. Hayato does not possess any ninja skills; he is teaching the students about normal Japanese society in order to pay a large debt that was originally his friend's debt but was passed down to him. However, Himawari notices that Hayato bears the same mark on his neck as the ninja who saved her when she was young.

Himawari! is the story of Himawari and her journey to become a kunoichi, and the vow she makes to protect her teacher.

== Characters ==
Himawari Hinata (日向 ひまわり, Hinata Himawari)
Voiced by: Kana Matsumoto
The female lead of the story. She was rescued by a ninja with an odd mark on his neck. Ever since then, she had sworn to become a ninja. The story begins with her trying to gain entry into the ninja academy.
She meets Marikoji Hayato, the male lead, after a foul-up of her training (hang-gliding on a kite) which causes her to become stuck on a giant gate pole. Hayato attempts to rescue her, leading her to refer to him from then on as "Hayato-dono" (dono is a suffix used for samurai to respect their honor). Her one and only dream is to become a great kunoichi despite her classmates finding her annoying and unskilled.
Hayato Marikoji (万里小路 ハヤト, Marikōji Hayato)
Voiced by: Kōichi Tōchika
A single, 24-year-old man who took the job as a teacher in order to settle a two million yen debt. Hayato wanted to quit his job when he found that the whole village is not normal and that the students he was teaching were ninja, but Himawari's rescue from being run over by a train had changed his mind.
Hayato doesn't fit in with the surroundings but manages to find a way to survive. For Hayato, it's his luck, his ducking ability when confronted with someone more skilled than he is, and some of his students taking a shine to him. On top of that, Hayato is skilled at throwing darts, which translates into moderate skill throwing kunai.
Because of his debt, Hayato spends most of the series trying desperately to earn money. This also results in Hayato spending much of the series scrounging for food.
Azami (あざみ)
Voiced by: Ryōko Shiraishi
Azami is a collector of (sometimes useless) information. He's strong-minded and high-spirited. He masquerades as a girl in order to attend the girls' school in which he acts as a spy for the students of a nearby boys' ninja school. This situation is known by the girls' school and tolerated since Azami also provides information about the boys' ninja school.
Shikimi (しきみ)
Voiced by: Aya Hirano
A grey-haired kunoichi-in-training who wears glasses. She is very knowledgeable about medicinal herbs and is among the more serious students in the ninja academy. One exception to her seriousness is that she keeps secret contact with Nanafushi, a male ninja from the boys' ninja school. Her ninja teleportation is slow, warping the scene, unlike the other ninja. She sometimes lets her hair down.
Yusura (ゆすら)
Voiced by: Asumi Nakata
Yusura is a cute, young animal-themed kunoichi-in-training. She has panda-like paws, a tail, and animal ears and frequently compares various things to other animals. She is also shown to have the ability to converse with animals, and accordingly is in a relationship with Yonezawa, a kappa.
Momota (もも太)
Voiced by: Yui Kano
Yusura's pet animal whose attacks consist of farting. Yusura nursed it to health when it was injured, starting their friendship. So it gets jealous when it sees her with anyone else, especially Yonesawa.
Himeji (ヒメジ)
Voiced by: Mayumi Yoshida
This dark-skinned, strangely speaking kunoichi-in-training is an expert in weaponry; carrying and using guns without restraint. She also uses a large sword. Himeji is half-American and dislikes cold temperatures.
Tsukiyohime (つきよ姫)
Voiced by: Yūko Ōtake
This traditionally clad young woman with a mysterious demeanor and elf ears is another kunoichi-in-training who doesn't appear very often. When she does, she's always eating miso soup. She either gives advice, shows the major characters what's concurrent events through her miso soup, gives someone the miso soup to eat, or some combination of the above.
Nanafushi (ナナフシ)
Voiced by: Takashi Kondō
He and Shikimi meet when she finds him in bottom of a pit in the mountains, immobilized by a leg injury. Though the two have good rapport, which others take to suggest romance, they maintain a casual friendship with limited contact. Nanafushi makes occasional appearances in times of need.
The Boss (お頭, Okashira), Wabisuke (わび助), and Sabisuke (さび助)
Voiced by: Hiromi Hirata (The Boss), Yui Kano (Wabisuke), Miho Miyagawa (Sabisuke)
"The Boss" is a green-haired woman who rescued two kids, Wabisuke and Sabisuke, who have since been her subordinates. She believes that Hayato is a descendant of someone who killed her ancestors (later revealed to be Oda Nobunaga). After many bungled assassination attempts and suffering from being at the wrong place at the wrong time, she learns that Hayato is not her enemy.
Yonezawa (米澤)
Voiced by: Takashi Kondō
A surprisingly friendly kappa. He is Yusura's boyfriend. He likes to eat cucumbers.

== Anime ==
Theme Music

The opening theme for the first season is Taiyō no Kakera" by Ryōko Shiraishi while the ending theme is "Guruguru ~Himawari ver.~" by Eufonius. For the second season, the opening theme is "Sorairo no Tsubasa" by Ryōko Shiraishi and the ending theme changes for various episodes - "Kirakira" by Eufonius (episodes 1, 8, and 13), Aya Hirano (episodes 2, 9, and 12), Kana Matsumoto (episodes 3, 6, and 10), Mayumi Yoshida (episode 4), Ryoko Shiraishi (episodes 5 and 11), and Asumi Nakata (episode 7).

=== Series overview ===
Season	Episodes	Originally released		
Season	Episodes	First released	Last released	Network
1	13	April 8, 2006	July 1, 2006	Chiba TV
2	13	January 6, 2007	March 31, 2007	Chiba TV

== Episode list ==
=== Season 1 (2006) ===
No.	Title	Original release date
1	"Protect One's Master"; Transliteration: "Goshujin-sama o Omamori Shimasu" (Japanese: ご主人様をお守りします)	April 8, 2006
Hayato arrives at the ninja village without any knowledge that it is a ninja village. As soon as he arrives, he saves Himawari, and understands that the school he is going to teach in is full of kunoichi. He is tested by the kunoichi, even when he wants to quit and leave the village, but is stopped by Himawari, who wants him to be her master.
2	"One Must not Fall in Love"; Transliteration: "Kesshite Horete wa Naranu no desu" (Japanese: 決して惚れてはならぬのです)	April 15, 2006
Love is forbidden between the students learning at boys ninja school and the girls kunoichi school. If one falls in love, they are forever expelled. But what happens when a chance meeting results between two like minded individuals.
3	"One's Lips Stay Shut, Even if it Means Death"; Transliteration: "Shinde mo Guchi wa Waranu no desu" (Japanese: 死んでも口は割らぬのです)	April 22, 2006
There is going to be a karakuri competition between the boys and girls schools, and the challenge is to gather the heads of Jizo-sama. But it seems like one of the girls is a spy!
4	"Stealing is a Shinobi's Shame"; Transliteration: "Nuusmi wa Shinobi no Haji desu mono" (Japanese: 盗みは忍びの恥ですもの)	April 29, 2006
Hayato is blamed for the students showing no interest in general affairs and looked down on by the other teachers. After getting blamed for breaking the head mistress's favorite doll, he decides to quit. But is Himawari also going to give up so easily?
5	"Kunoichi's Forbidden Valentine"; Transliteration: "Kunoichi Gohatto Barentain" (Japanese: くのいち御法度バレンタイン)	May 6, 2006
Himawari has a ritual for Valentine's day, which she has learnt from a scroll - those who are ninjas, on the night of the full moon in the second month should give their masters chocolate to eat and pledge themselves for eternity. What is Himawari to do when a rival appears?
6	"A Shinobi Trains at the Risk of their Life"; Transliteration: "Shinobi no Shugyō wa Inochigake" (Japanese: 忍びの修行は命がけ)	May 13, 2006
Himawari learns of a Great Sage of ninjas living in the mountain. She intends to learn amazing ninja techniques from him. But will she? And exactly who is this Great Sage?
7	"One must not Take Lives Needlessly"; Transliteration: "Mudana Sesshō wa Itashimasenu" (Japanese: 無駄な殺生はいたしませぬ)	May 20, 2006
Himeji finds a giant karakuri, which she keeps a secret from the other. Just what is this giant and where did it come from?
8	"One Shall Protect Everybody"; Transliteration: "Min'na Matomere Omamori Shimasu" (Japanese: みんなまとめてお守りします)	May 27, 2006
A special lecturer arrives at the school, who is a master in disguise and whose face no one has seen. There also seems to be a western spy, who is stealing the blood of all the specially born kunoichi.
9	"One Part of Ninja is Love"; Transliteration: "Ninja no Shinobu wa Shinobu (Koi) no Shinobu" (Japanese: 忍者の忍はしのぶ（恋）の忍)	June 3, 2006
10	"Shinobi have No Need of Mercy"; Transliteration: "Shinobi ni Nasake wa Muyōna no desu" (Japanese: 忍びに情けは無用なのです)	June 10, 2006
11	"It's an Inextricable Bond"; Transliteration: "Kittemokirenai Kizunana no desu" (Japanese: 切っても切れない絆なのです)	June 17, 2006
12	"One Should not Interfere in a Quarrel between Master and Servant"; Transliteration: "Shujū Genka wa Inumokuwanu" (Japanese: 主従ゲンカは犬も食わぬ)	June 24, 2006
13	"So Long as One Lives, One is a Retainer"; Transliteration: "Inochi atte no Kerai desu" (Japanese: 命あっての家来です)	July 1, 2006

=== Season 2 Himawari!! (2007) ===
R	A	Title	Written by	Storyboarded by	Original release date
14	1	"Enemy of Ninja, another Ninja"; Transliteration: "Ninja no teki, mata ninja" (Japanese: 忍者の敵も、また忍者)	Mamiko Ikeda	Kageyama Jorin	January 6, 2007
15	2	"If You Eat Plants, With It Comes Poison As Well"; Transliteration: "Kusa wo kurawaba, doku made mo" (Japanese: 草を食らわば、毒までも)	Mamiko Ikeda	Sumio Watanabe	January 13, 2007
16	3	"Knives Aren`t Needed for Killing Men"; Transliteration: "Otoko korosu nya hamono wa iranu" (Japanese: 男殺すにゃ刃物はいらぬ)	Masahiro Yokoya	Kageyama Jorin	January 20, 2007
transferred to take control
17	4	"There`s a Fine Line Between Attack and Defense"; Transliteration: "Semeru mo mamoru mo kamihitoe" (Japanese: 攻めるも守るも紙一重)	Yuka Yamada	Sumio Watanabe	January 27, 2007
18	5	"The Female Ninja`s Great Strategy"; Transliteration: "Kunoichi mittei taisakusen" (Japanese: くのいち密偵大作戦)	Yuka Yamada	Kageyama Jorin	February 3, 2007
19	6	"Alternative? The Bonds of Fate between Master and Servant"; Transliteration: "Nishatakuitsu? juujuu no kizuna to akaiito" (Japanese: 二者択一?主従の絆と赤い糸)	Mamiko Ikeda	Yuji Uchida	February 10, 2007
20	7	"Bewildered and Perplexed; Surrounded by Enemies"; Transliteration: "Madoi madowasu shimensoku" (Japanese: 惑い惑わし四面楚歌)	Megumu Sasano	Kinji Yoshimoto	February 17, 2007
21	8	"The Moonlit Forest is Full of Dangers"; Transliteration: "Tsukiyo no mori wa kiken ga ippai" (Japanese: つきよの森は危険がいっぱい)	Yuka Yamada	Sumio Watanabe	February 24, 2007
22	9	"Friends Yesterday are Enemies Today"; Transliteration: "Kinoi no tomo wa kyou no teki" (Japanese: 昨日の友は今日の敵)	Masahiro Yokotani	Sumio Watanabe	March 3, 2007
23	10	"Himawari Returns to Her Hometown"; Transliteration: "Himawari, kokyou ni kaeru" (Japanese: ひまわり、故郷に帰る)	Megumu Sasano	Sumio Watanabe	March 10, 2007
24	11	"A Past of Secrecy is a Tricky Pattern"; Transliteration: "Himetsu no koko wa karakuri moyou" (Japanese: 秘密の過去はカラクリ模様)	Mamiko Ikeda	Sumio Watanabe	March 17, 2007
25	12	"Rescue! Friends of Shinobi Go Through Thick and Thin Together"; Transliteration: "Kyuushutsu! shinobi no yomo wa ichirentakushou" (Japanese: 救出!忍びの友は一蓮托生)	Mamiko Ikeda	Sumio Watanabe	March 24, 2007
26	13	"Final Battle! Master and Servant`s Eternal Vows"; Transliteration: "Kessen! juujuu no chigiri wa eien ni" (Japanese: 決戦!主従の契りは永遠に)	Mamiko Ikeda	Sumio Watanabe	March 31, 2007
