= Asumi Nakada =

Japanese television personality, model, and voice actress (born 1988)

- 中田 あすみ
- Born: April 5, 1988 (age 38); Tokyo, Japan
- Other name: Asumi Nakata
- Education: Hosei University
- Occupations: Television personality; model; voice actress
- Years active: 1991–present
- Children: 1
- Modeling information
- Height: 1.72 m (5 ft 8 in)
- Agency: Oscar Promotion
- Musical career
- Genres: Anison
- Formerly of: Crybaby

Asumi Nakada (中田あすみ, Nakada Asumi; born April 5, 1988), formerly known under the stage name Asumi Nakata, is a Japanese television personality, model, and voice actress associated with Oscar Promotion. She debuted in 1991 at the age of 3 as a child model, appearing in many commercials. From 1998 to 2002, she was a regular on the first two series of the children's variety show Tensai TV-kun. She rejoined the series in 2007 in its third series, Tensai TV-kun Max and has become a prominent cast member in the segment Bitworld until the series' end in 2026.

As a voice actress, Nakada has provided the voice to Lucia Nanami in Mermaid Melody: Pichi Pichi Pitch (2003–2004), Yusura in Himawari! (2006–2007), and Cissnei in the Compilation of Final Fantasy VII.

== Career ==
Nakada entered the entertainment industry at age 3 and was a regular on the children's variety television program Tensai TV-kun. At the age of 9, she made her music debut with Ayano Shiraishi, in a duo called Crybaby. Their first and only single, "Maigo no Tenshi", was released in 1997. Since 2000, Nakada was part of the talent agency Five Eight. In her early teens, she became an exclusive model for the teen fashion magazine Pichi Lemon.

In April 2003, she performed her first voice acting role in the Japanese anime series Mermaid Melody Pichi Pichi Pitch as the heroine Lucia Nanami. On August 14, 2005, she was a guest at the Sixth Manga Fair (漫畫博覽會) in Taiwan. There, she performed a theme song of Mermaid Melody Pichi Pichi Pitch, "Legend of Mermaid".

On October 10, 2005, Nakada was transferred to Switch 58, a subdivision of Five Eight that focuses on acting. She also provides the voice of Yusura in the anime series Himawari!, broadcast from April 2006.

In 2010, Nakada transferred to Oscar Promotion.

== Personal life ==
Nakada attended Hosei University.

On March 27, 2017, Nakada married a company executive, who is the same age at her, after four years of dating. The two had met when they were classmates at Hosei University. On August 8, 2021, she announced through Instagram that she had given birth to a son.

== Filmography ==
=== Anime ===
Year	Title	Role	Notes	Source
2003–04	Mermaid Melody Pichi Pichi Pitch	Lucia Nanami	Also Pure	
2006–07	Himawari!	Yusura	Also Himawari!!	

=== Video games ===
Year	Title	Role	Notes	Source
2007	Crisis Core: Final Fantasy VII	Cissnei		
2021	Dissidia Final Fantasy Opera Omnia	Cissnei		
2022	Crisis Core: Final Fantasy VII Reunion	Cissnei		
2024	Final Fantasy VII Rebirth	Cissnei		

=== Film ===
Year	Title	Role	Notes	Source
2002	Swan's Song	Kaori Shimura		

== Discography ==
=== CDs ===
- Splash Dream (2003)
- Mother Symphony (2004)

=== Radio ===
- Himawari Radio
