= List of Mermaid Melody Pichi Pichi Pitch characters =

The following is a list of characters from the manga and anime series Mermaid Melody Pichi Pichi Pitch. They are grouped according to their roles in the series.

== Main characters ==
Three DVD covers showing the three forms of the main characters Lucia Nanami (blonde), Hanon Hosho (blue), and Rina Toin (green): mermaid (left cover), human (center cover), idol (right cover).

Lucia Nanami (七海 るちあ, Nanami Ruchia)
Voiced by: Asumi Nakada
Lucia is the mermaid princess of the North Pacific Ocean and keeper of the pink pearl. She goes up to land to search for her pearl which she used to save a boy named Kaito seven years ago. Later in the series, Lucia and Kaito become lovers. She is unaware of the danger in the marine world and of her real mission until she is told of them by her "big sister", Nikora. She is characterized by her cheerfulness and upbeatness, but with having a strong will. In the Pure season, Seira is about to be born as well, waiting to meet Lucia, who has the job of retrieving all the pieces of her heart contained in Michel's feathers. Overall, no matter what the situation, she never gives up hope. Her idol form is Pink Pearl Voice.
Hanon Hosho (宝生 波音, Hōshō Hanon)
Voiced by: Hitomi Terakado
Hanon is the Mermaid Princess of the South Atlantic Ocean and keeper of the blue pearl (aquamarine mainly). She is Lucia's best friend, but fights with her like any teenage girl. Unlike Lucia, Hanon goes up to land to escape water creatures. She is perky and flirtatious and a bit more worldly than Lucia, although she tends to be lazy when it comes to cleaning. This worldliness is evidenced by many of her actions—especially by her romantic pursuit of her music teacher, Tarō Mitsuki. In the Pure season, she develops an interest in a boy, Nagisa. Her idol form is Aqua or Blue Pearl Voice.
Rina Toin (洞院 リナ, Tōin Rina)
Voiced by: Mayumi Asano
Rina is the Mermaid Princess of the North Atlantic Ocean and keeper of the green pearl. During school, she accidentally wears the boys' uniform instead of the girls. Initially, she is depicted as beautiful, but stern and bent on revenge for the capture of her best friend, Noel. Later, however, she evolves into a more mature character, and acts as a sister figure to Lucia and Hanon. She eventually becomes close to a boxer, Masahiro. Her idol form is Green Pearl Voice.

== Supporting characters ==
Kaito Domoto (堂本 海斗, Dōmoto Kaito)
Voiced by: Daisuke Kishio
Kaito, the adoptive son of a pair of musicians, is an avid surfer, as well as Lucia's boyfriend. Though he is popular with girls, he is secretly in love with a beautiful mermaid who saved him from a shipwreck seven years ago (caused by Sara when her pearl went out of control), and has yet to realize that this mermaid is Lucia. Kaito kept Lucia's pearl in a necklace until he gave it back to her. Later in the story, it is discovered that beneath Kaito's human exterior lie some distinctively inhuman qualities and that he is the prince of an ancient water race called Panthalassa and is the twin brother of Gaito. Aqua Regina separated Gaito and Kaito to prevent world chaos. Kaito has a hard time when Lucia comes in her human form, because of having feelings for both her human form and her mermaid form. Kaito eventually realizes that the two are one, giving Kaito the ability to love Lucia no matter what form she is in. Dōmoto is derived from KinKi Kids.
Hippo (ヒッポ, Hippo)
Voiced by: Miyako Ito
Lucia's guardian who serves as her guide. He is shown as Lucia's pet penguin. Hippo accompanies Lucia in her search for her pink pearl, and is among those who voice disapproval of her relationship with Kaito. He is also polite, always putting -さん, -san after every name, even when angry. Later on, he is able to transform into a very cute human boy as well as a legendary creature called a Hippocampus. In his human form, Hippo falls in love with a Dark Lover, Yuri. In anime shows, Lucia and the other five mermaid princess try to get them to meet, even for just a short time. Hippo transforms into a Hippocampus using a key he lost and retrieved while trying to save Tarō from Sara. His real form as "Hippocampus" resembles a unicorn.
Nikora Nanami (七海 にこら, Nanami Nikora)
Voiced by: Eri Saito
Nikora is the virtual manager of the "petit-hotel" Pearl Piari (プチ ホテル パール ピアリ, puchi-hoteru pāru piari) on land, where Lucia, Hanon, and Rina work (in the manga, she is the owner of a bath house called Pearl Waters). A purple mermaid, she poses as Lucia's big sister in order to inform her of her mission. She has a crush on Maki, the owner of a bar.
Madame Taki (タキさん, Taki-san)
Voiced by: Kumi Yamakado
Madame Taki is the owner of the Pearl Piari, as well as the pearl oyster fairy. A fairly major character in the anime who is a fortune teller and friend to the mermaid princesses. Everyone thinks her predictions are wrong, never saying yes when she asks if they want one. Sometimes though, they are right, leaving them astounded. In episode 13, her true form is shown.
Tarō Mitsuki (海月 太郎, Mitsuki Tarō)
Voiced by: Daisuke Kirii
Tarō is Lucia's music teacher. He had met a mermaid in the past (Sara), and made a piano piece for her, not knowing what happened to her after their last meeting. In the anime, he was acquainted with Kaito's dad seeking advice on music. Tarō wishes to make amends with Sara. He later moves to Germany after giving Hanon a sheet music as a gift for helping him.

=== Marine World ===
Caren (かれん, Karen)
Voiced by: Ema Kogure
Caren is the Mermaid Princess of the Antarctic Ocean, keeper of the purple pearl, and twin sister of Noel. In the anime, she first appears as the winner of a beauty contest that the main trio enters. In the first season, Tarō asks her about his mermaid, and she later blames Rina for Noel's kidnapping. Even after things are straightened out, she chooses to go find Noel alone. She is Noel's polar opposite, having a mysterious personality. Caren and Noel are twins, born on opposite sides of the Earth. Even though the two had not met before, Caren cares most for Noel and would do anything to save her, even if it meant Caren having to find her on her own. While she is cold and distant in the first season, she is found to be wild, humorous, and even a bit strange in the second. Caren finds a boy named Subaru Carraford Hashimoto, a British glaciologist helped resolve a meltdown in the Pure season episode 15. Her idol form is Purple Pearl Voice.
Noel (ノエル, Noeru)
Voiced by: Ryoko Nagata
Noel is the Mermaid Princess of the Arctic Ocean and keeper of the indigo (i.e. 藍色, ai-iro) pearl. She loves to read books and is a good friend of Rina. She helped Rina escape from the sea monsters, which led to her capture. She is calm, gentle, caring, and studious. She is Caren's twin sister by about a minute at the most. Noel cares deeply for Caren, the one that she had always wanted to meet. Her idol form is Indigo Pearl Voice.
Coco (ココ, Koko)
Voiced by: Satomi Arai
Coco is the Mermaid Princess of the South Pacific Ocean and keeper of the yellow pearl. She is incarcerated by the sea monsters for most of the first season, so not much is known about her other than that she is a friend of fellow Mermaid Princess Sara and seems to know Lucia's existence. Coco normally worries for her friends, especially Sara and can keep their secrets very well. She is a bit flirtatious, but doesn't have any relationships with boys in the manga and anime. Her idol form is Yellow Pearl Voice.
Aqua Regina (アクア・レジーナ様, Akua Rejīna-sama)
Voiced by: Kumi Yamakado
Aqua Regina is the ocean goddess who guides the Mermaid Princesses. However, this is all that she can do alone after expending a great deal of energy thousands of years ago. She is needed to ultimately stop the sea monsters, and the seven pearls have to be gathered to summon her; Gaito seeks to summon her as well, so that he can use her to destroy the world. Aqua Regina later gives bands to the mermaids to upgrade their singing power; this is signified by adding frills and accessories to their gear. She also upgrades their microphones in the end of season one, before she is finally summoned. At the end of the manga, Aqua Regina has chosen Lucia to be her successor.
Seira Amagi (天城 星羅, Amagi Seira)
Voiced by: Eri Kitamura
Seira is the future mermaid princess of the Indian Ocean and successor keeper of the orange pearl. She appears as an unborn spirit to Lucia in the Pure season, taking the form of a young mermaid. When her time of birth finally came, Michel seized his chance and absorbed Seira into his body, and her birth was therefore delayed until Lucia could retrieve all the pieces of her heart contained in Michel's feathers. Every time Lucia retrieves a piece of her heart from one of Michel's fallen feathers, Seira learns something about an emotion, such as love or friendship. Seira is very child-like and sees the good in Michel, realizing that he has good intentions for the Earth. Once born, she is destined to become Orange Pearl Voice.

=== Human World ===
The following characters primarily appeared in the Pure season of the anime:
Michal Amagi (天城みかる, Amagi Mikaru)
Voiced by: Ryoko Shintani
Michal is the girl who finds Kaito after he had lost his memories. She's a rich, yet desperately lonely girl who has lost all hope. She falls "in love" with Kaito to the point that, in Lucia's perspective, he has forgotten his mermaid love completely, and is desperate that he return her feelings. Michal also seems to be a sickly girl, collapsing to the floor every time Michel appears somewhere else or when Kaito is near Lucia (in order to keep Kaito to herself). In the manga, when Kaito states that he loves only Lucia and could never love Michal the way that she "loves him", Michal takes off her clothes and offers herself to him in desperation of keeping him. Kaito turns away from her and leaves. This is a large trigger for her collapses and allows Michel to take control of her. In the end, Michal is reborn and given to her brother to raise her again peacefully.
Rihito Amagi (天城リヒト, Amagi Rihito)
Voiced by: Takahiro Mizushima
Rihito is an orchestral conductor and Michal's older brother. After initially seeing Kaito and Lucia at the airport, he becomes a "bridge" for the two. He observes Kaito's progress in regaining his memories (despite his sister being around) while he checks on Lucia and comforts her as she copes with the loss of her emotional bond. Rihito tries hard to get Michal to realize that she could never be with Kaito even though she doesn't want to hear it. In the anime, when Kaito leaves after telling Michal that he loves Lucia, Rihito restrains Michal from going after Kaito. When Michal is reborn, he promises that he will care for her and raise her again. It is later revealed that both he and Michal are part of the same race as Kaito, Pantharassa, leading Rihito to believe that is the true reason why Michal is so attracted to Kaito. Rihito uses a staff (like Gaito's) in the final battle with Michel, and reveals he's aware of Lucia's mermaid form.
Masahiro Hamasaki (浜崎雅弘, Hamasaki Masahiro)
Voiced by: Kiyotaka Furushima
Masahiro is a flirtatious boy who has a crush on Rina. He wears glasses, rides a motorcycle and does some amateur boxing. It is later revealed that he comes from a family running a boxing gym. In the anime, he isn't aware of Rina's mermaid form, but he does understand that she has a reason not to be with him, and wants to know more about Rina and how to love her. In the end, Masahiro is officially Rina's boyfriend. In the manga, he is introduced earlier (before Gaito is even defeated) and is so mysterious that he is only known by his surname. The name "Masahiro" was not created by the animation team, but by Pink Hanamori's staff, as revealed in the fifth volume of the manga.
Nagisa Shirai (白井 渚, Shirai Nagisa)
Voiced by: Chihiro Kusaka
Nagisa is a young boy who has a crush on Hanon. After retrieving some sheet music for Hanon, he has been wooing her ever since. Unfortunately for him, the sheet music is of the tune Tarō Mitsuki dedicated to Hanon, which only reminds her of her fixation on the much more refined and older man. Still, his resilience is to be admired, and she eventually treats him better. In the manga, he says that he is two years younger than Hanon. In the end, Hanon received a letter from Tarō telling her to move on; falls in love with Nagisa and they have a relationship.

== Minor recurring characters ==
Though there are several minor characters on both sides who appear within both the manga and the anime series, the following listed below have played significant roles in the story.
Sara's servant (Bāya)
A manga-only character, she is Sara's servant and guardian from childhood, and worries about Sara's involvement with Gaito. The old woman therefore helps the princesses in secret to atone for what her ward has become.
Momo (ももちゃん)
Voiced by: Naomi Wakabayashi
A pink dolphin from Lucia's realm. Initially appeared being showcased in an indoor aquarium for curiosity. After being rescued by the Mermaid Princesses and reunited with its mom, its role is later reduced to occasional messenger. While the Mermaid Princesses could communicate with it using their inner voices, whenever it is with Kaito, he can easily understand the meaning of its gestures.
Meru (芽流, Meru)
Voiced by: Ema Kogure
A young South Atlantic mermaid coming up to land asking the Mermaid Princesses for help in finding her mom. Like many of the mermaids, she is displeased seeing Hanon and Lucia having relationships with humans, at which Yūri takes advantage. However, she is enamored by Kaito so much that not only she changed her outlook about relationships with humans, but also makes a second appearance in the anime just to ask his hand (playfully) for marriage, to Lucia's chagrin.
Maki (真木, Maki)
Voiced by: Keijin Okuda
The owner of the nearby beach house where Lucia, Hanon, Rina, and Kaito work part-time. He is a widower and still keeps a picture of his late wife Saori at his bar. He is attracted to Nikora, leading to a marriage proposal which the latter called off (due to conflicting feelings). He only exists in the anime.

== Antagonists ==
=== Marine antagonists ===
Gaito (ガイト, Gaito) / Gackto (楽斗/ガクト, Gakuto)
Voiced by: Daisuke Kishio
Gaito is the leader of the sea monsters who is the principal antagonist of season one. Gaito is bent on taking over the Marine World. He is always depicted drinking wine, and wearing black. He is member of the Pantharassa, and is the older twin brother of Kaito. His resemblance to Kaito made the latter a subject of initial ire by Rina. His two main goals were to find his twin brother Kaito and to capture all seven of the Mermaid Princesses to revive Aqua Regina. He needed Kaito because he thought that once the two were together, their powers combined were strong enough to take over the world. In episode 30, he disguised himself as Kaito and seems to get feelings for Lucia's human form. He was lonely half his life at the bottom of the sea until he met Sara, the orange pearl princess. When he lost his power, he stayed with his castle and Sara came back with him. He loved Sara, and always tried to please her with "gifts".
The Dark Lovers (ダーク・ラバーズ, Dāku Rabāzu)
Gaito's four female followers who serve him in exchange for his love for them. There are composed of the following:

- Izuru (イズール, Izūru)

Voiced by: Sayori Ishizuka
Izuru is the most mature of the four and the only one to have a mermaid's tail, she has the power to control waves and marine beasts and has the ability to create dragons from water. In episode 52, she turned back to her original form, a shark.

- Eriru (エリル, Eriru)

Voiced by: Yuki Matsuoka
Eriru is the one with the multiple personality disorder. At one phase, she is cute, beady-eyed, and acting as if she were antsy (spinning around and never saying any normal speech). In another phase she can speak correctly and is more observant of her surroundings. In her third phase, when threatened (or when she spins around), she becomes scary, her eyes glow red, and she changes her voice accordingly. In episode 52, she turned back to her original form, a ray.

- Maria (マリア, Maria)

Voiced by: Sanae Kobayashi
Maria is the one closest to Gaito in terms of love. She seems to be the most innocent of the group, but in actuality she can be very cruel at times, and sometimes seems to see Gaito more as a boy-toy than a love prospect. In the first season, she attempts to capture Kaito when she witnesses his resemblance to Gaito. She has the power to make and/or manipulate ice and snow. In episode 52, she turned back to her original form, an eel.

- Yūri (ユーリ, Yūri)

Voiced by: Chieko Honda
Yūri is the youngest-looking of the four. She has the ability to control people and objects, especially with the use of her music and, if any, a nearby piano. Although Yūri is loyal to Gaito, his continued treatment of her as a child leads her to a star-crossed relationship with Hippo, i.e. his human form. In episode 52, she turned back to her original form, a coelacanth.
Black Beauty Sisters (ブラック・ビューティー・シスターズ, Burakku Byūtī Shisutāzu)
Sheshe Voiced by: Miki Tsuchiya
Mimi Voiced by: Noriko Shitaya
They are composed of the red-wearing older sister Sheshe (シスターシェシェ, Shisutā Sheshe) and the blue-wearing younger sister Mimi (シスターミミ, Shisutā Mimi). Gaito hires them after the Dark Lovers' failed attempts to capture the Mermaid Princesses. These two have the ability to sing tunes more powerful than the songs the Mermaid Princesses themselves sing, although in the anime and the second arc of the manga, the Princesses manage to get strong enough to overpower them. Though Gaito turned them back to their original forms (two anglerfishes), they are brought back in the second season after being revived by that season's antagonist, Michel, and made them his servants. It has been shown that Mimi has a human form whose hair gets longer and wears glasses over her brown eyes. She befriends with Lucia, Hanon, and Rina. Once Mimi learned of their mermaid identities she hesitates to capture them. As a result, Mimi and Sheshe rebel against Michel and almost overpower him, but are absorbed by him.
Sara (沙羅, Sara)
Voiced by: Kana Ueda
Sara is the current mermaid princess of the Indian Ocean and keeper of the orange pearl. She joins Gaito in his quest to take over the marine world after an incident bestowed her a dark power, turning both her orange hair pitch black (though her eyes stay orange) and destroying her own kingdom. That incident was a proposed rendezvous with Tarō, her secret human lover, in which he never showed up. (In the manga, he actually arrived before, but Sara's guardian found out about the relationship and insisted that he should leave, convincing Sara that he had abandoned her.) In a fury, Sara unleashed a wave of power, destroying her kingdom in the process and causing the wave which killed Kaito's parents and from when Lucia saved Kaito. In the manga, her villain name is Black Pearl Voice and she transforms into an idol in a black dress reminiscent of a diva. However, in the anime, she does not transform until she turns good, and instead has the power to sing offensively in a humanoid, amphibious form like the villains and mermaid idols, with or without her E-Pitch microphone. In the end, she decides to join the other mermaids as is her duty. In the manga, Aqua Regina seals the gate to Gaito's castle and Sara goes with Gaito because she loves him. The manga shows that she goes with him because she realizes that he is the one that needs her the most and that what he did was partly out of love for her and the want to make her happy. However in the anime, when Gaito lost his power, his castle sinks to the bottom of the ocean. While the mermaids are going back to the surface, Sara gives her pearl to Luchia. After bidding her farewell to Tarou, Sara goes back to Gaito, along with the Dark Lovers, and they die together in a final embrace. She also appears in the second season as a spirit, informing Lucia of the future Orange Pearl Voice and offering her assistance where she can.

=== Winged antagonists ===
Michel (ミケル, Mikeru)
Voiced by: Junko Minagawa
Michel is an artificial being created by the Ancients. Michel resembles an angel and is the one who launched a personal vendetta against the Mermaid Princesses after learning their relations with the human world. Although he is strong enough to resist any song the Mermaid Princesses would dish out against him until the finale, he is cursed with a weak body. He steals both Kaito's memories and Seira's heart in order to keep himself alive. In the manga, it is revealed that Michel is under the control of Fuku and is very good and gentle at heart. Michel is an ancient angel and is disgusted by what humans had done to the Earth that he and the other angels created. This explains why he needs Michal's body, Seira's heart, the heart of a mermaid princess, which means a fairly large amount of power, and Kaito's memories because he is a very powerful prince whose powers may rival those of the mermaid princesses. Michel believes that "angels" and mermaids are superior beings to humans because both species understand the importance of the Earth and each have powers, in one form or another.
Fuku (フクちゃん, Fuku-chan)
Voiced by: Sanae Kobayashi
Fuku appears like a super deformed angel with the head of a boy and the body of a bird. He is Michel's "right hand man", as well as his messenger to his servants, but at times, he orders around, even Michel. He turns out to have a larger role later in the story.
The Great One (あの方, Ano kata; him/that gentleman)
Voiced by: Hajime Iijima
A spirit in the form of a flame atop of Michel's castle, he guards it for him. At one point, Fuku-chan claims that his words are Michel's words, and Michel's are That One's words, and That One's are God's words. He has a higher authority than Michel and has a strange relationship with Fuku-chan, where it is unclear who is in charge. During the final battle, it is revealed that he is the father of Rihito and Michal.
Lady Bat (レディバット, Redī-batto)
Voiced by: Sanae Kobayashi
Lady Bat calls himself "the wings of love and pleasure". Michel's vampire-like drag queen servant, his song hypnotizes the listeners into his spell so he could "bite" the person while they're asleep. He wears a frilly shirt and miniskirt, and speaks in a male tone, but changes to a female tone when he runs away from Mermaid Princesses. He wears men's clothes when disguised as a human. In his real form, he has dark red hair and lavender-colored eyes. In his human disguises, his hair is black and his eyes are greenish-blue.
Lanhua (蘭花, Ranfa)
Voiced by: Megumi Kojima
Lanhua calls herself "the wings of desire and contentment". Michel's butterfly-like servant. She can divide into a dozen smaller versions of herself. In the manga, they cling Lucia while the leader is singing; in the anime, their song make the listeners dance forcedly. She is called Ranfa and Lang Fa in some merchandise, but the English translators for the manga decided to follow the Mandarin Chinese pronunciation of her name. In her real form, she has purple hair and red eyes; in her human disguise form, her eyes are brown and her hair color is a darker tone of purple.
Alala (あらら, Arara)
Voiced by: Masayo Kurata
Alala calls herself "the wings of dreams and decadence". Michel's fairy-like servant, she is quite peppy and upbeat most of the time. She sings two songs in the anime; a peppy song that shoots stars at the Princesses and a sugary sweet song that makes men cheer for her. In the manga, she can make people (or at least a Mermaid Princess) dream about anything she wishes, including nightmares. In her real form, she has green hair and pink eyes, in her human disguise form, her eyes are brown and her hair color is a bit darker (albeit retaining her pointy ears).
