= Mayumi Asano =

Japanese voice actress (born 1969)

- 浅野 まゆみ
- Born: November 13, 1969 (age 56); Tokyo, Japan
- Occupation: Voice actress
- Years active: 1996–present
- Agent: Office Osawa
- Notable credits: Naruto as Haku; Last Exile as Claus Valca; Eureka Seven as Hilda; Boogiepop Phantom as Manticore; Mermaid Melody Pichi Pichi Pitch as Rina Touin; Guilty Gear series as Baiken
- Height: 161 cm (5 ft 3 in)

Mayumi Asano (浅野 まゆみ, Asano Mayumi; born November 13, 1969 in Tokyo) is a Japanese voice actress who is currently part of Office Osawa.

== Filmography ==
=== Television ===
- Yami no Matsuei series 2: Summer Vacation – Hisoka Kurosaki
- Yami no Matsuei series 1 (1999) – Hisoka Kurosaki
- Flame of Recca (1997) – young Tokiya Mikagami
- Berserk (1997) – Adonis
- Boogiepop Phantom (2000) – Manticore and Boogiepop Phantom
- Mighty Cat Masked Niyander (2000) – Masked Niyander/Nyago
- Ceres, The Celestial Legend (2000) – Suzumi Aogiri
- Yami no Matsuei (2000) – Hisoka Kurosaki
- Angel Sanctuary (2000) – Arachne
- Angelic Layer (2001) – Tomoko Yamada
- Pecola (2001) – Robo-Pecola
- Vandread (2001) – Gascogne Rheingau
- Zoids: New Century Zero (2001) – Fūma
- Mōtto! Ojamajo Doremi (2001) – Majo Reed
- Forza! Hidemaru (2002) – Hidemaru
- Full Metal Panic! (2002) – Seina
- Last Exile (2002) – Claus Valca
- Naruto (2002) – Haku
- F-Zero GP Legend (2003) – Lisa Brilliant
- Mermaid Melody Pichi Pichi Pitch (2003) – Rina Toin
- Stratos 4 (2003) – Alice Mikuriya, Mikaze's mother
- Wolf's Rain (2003) – Blue
- Bleach (2004) – Horiuchi Hironari
- Fantastic Children (2004) – Reda
- Mermaid Melody Pichi Pichi Pitch Pure (2004) – Rina Toin
- Onmyou Taisenki – Kanna
- Eureka Seven (2005) – Hilda, young Holland
- Blood+ (2005) – Anna Marie
- Otogi Zoshi (2005) – Kuzume
- Crash B-Daman (2006) – Kaito Namihira
- Gintama (2007) – Ikumatsu
- Dragonaut -The Resonance- (2007) – Yuuri Kitajima
- Yes! PreCure 5 (2007) – Kazuyo Natsuki
- Strait Jacket (2007) – Filisis Moog
- C: The Money and Soul of Possibility (2011) – Jennifer Satō
- Sankarea (2012) – Aria Sanka
- Naruto: Shippuden (2012) – Haku
- Ghost in the Shell: Arise (2013) – Kurtz
- Dokidoki! PreCure (2013) – Mannequin Carmine
- Hakkenden (2013) – Demon (Ep. 25)
- Ghost in the Shell: The Movie (2015) – Kurtz
- 91 Days (2016) – Lacrima
- Devils' Line (2018) – Midori Anzai
- 7 Seeds (2019) – Ran Shishigaki
- Beastars (2019) – Carnivore male dorm housemother
- Shimajiro to Ururu no Heroland (2019) – Captain Mimi
- Guilty Gear Strive: Dual Rulers (2025) – Baiken
- City the Animation (2025) – Adatara's mother

=== Video games ===
- Armored Core: Last Raven (2005) – Zinaida
- Guilty Gear Xrd Rev 2 (2017) – Baiken
- Samurai Shodown (2021) – Baiken
- The King of Fighters All Star (2021) – Baiken
- Guilty Gear -STRIVE- (2022) – Baiken
- Stranger of Paradise: Final Fantasy Origin (2022) – Sophia

=== Dubbing ===
Original year	Dub year	Title	Role	Original actor	Notes
2011–2013		Person of Interest	Joss Carter	Taraji P. Henson	
2015–2020		Empire	Loretha "Cookie" Lyon	Taraji P. Henson	
2016		Hidden Figures	Katherine Johnson	Taraji P. Henson	
2018		Ralph Breaks the Internet	Yesss	Taraji P. Henson	
2023		The Color Purple	Shug Avery	Taraji P. Henson	
2001		Ghost World	Rebecca	Scarlett Johansson	
2002		Eight Legged Freaks	Ashley Parker	Scarlett Johansson	
2019		Jojo Rabbit	Rosie	Scarlett Johansson	
2023		Asteroid City	Midge Campbell and Mercedes Ford	Scarlett Johansson	
1993	2001	Last Action Hero	Danny Madigan	Austin O'Brien	
1997–1998		Beverly Hills, 90210	Zach Reynolds	Myles Jeffrey	
1999		Not One Less	Zhang Huike	Zhang Huike	
2000		Coyote Ugly	Rachel	Bridget Moynahan	
2000		Thomas and the Magic Railroad	Young Burnett	Jared Wall	
2000–2007; 2009–2015		CSI: Crime Scene Investigation	Sara Sidle	Jorja Fox	
2001		Training Day	Sara	Eva Mendes	
2002		Blue Crush	Lena Olin	Sanoe Lake	
2003		Kangaroo Jack	Jessie	Estella Warren	
2003		School of Rock	Freddy "Spazzy McGee" Jones	Kevin Clark	
2003		Teen Titans	Blackfire	Hynden Walch	
2004		Bring It On Again	Monica Washington	Faune A. Chambers	
2004		Hotel Rwanda	Tatiana Rusesabagina	Sophie Okonedo	
2004		Night Watch	Olga	Galina Tyunina	
2004–2007		Code Lyoko	Ulrich Stern	Barbara Scaff	
2004–2009		Battlestar Galactica	Number Six	Tricia Helfer	
2005		V for Vendetta	Evey Hammond	Natalie Portman	
2005		Mindhunters	Nicole Willis	Patricia Velásquez	
2006		Blood Diamond	Maddy Bowen	Jennifer Connelly	
2006		Bring It On: All or Nothing	Camille	Solange Knowles	
2006		The Darwin Awards	Joleen	Juliette Lewis	
2006		Day Watch	Olga	Galina Tyunina	
2006		Miami Vice	Gina Galabrese	Elizabeth Rodriguez	
2006		Turistas	Amy	Beau Garrett	
2007		Flight of Fury	Jessica	Ciera Payton	
2007		La Vie en rose	Simone Berteaut	Sylvie Testud	
2007		Rush Hour 3	Dragon Lady Jasmine	Youki Kudoh	
2008		27 Dresses	Tess Nichols	Malin Åkerman	
2008		Made of Honor	Hannah	Michelle Monaghan	
2008		Yes Man	Allison	Zooey Deschanel	
2010		Somewhere	Rebecca	Michelle Monaghan	
2011		Fast Five	Rosa	Jeimy Osorio	
2011		Horrible Bosses	Dr. Julia Harris	Jennifer Aniston	
2012		Here Comes the Boom	Bella Flores	Salma Hayek	
2013		Man of Tai Chi	Sun Jing Shi	Karen Mok	
2014		The Drop	Nadia	Noomi Rapace	
2014		Everly	Everly	Salma Hayek	
2014		Horrible Bosses 2	Dr. Julia Harris	Jennifer Aniston	
2014–2019		The Blacklist	Samar Navabi	Mozhan Marnò	
2015		The Driftless Area	Stella	Zooey Deschanel	
2016		Collateral Beauty	Madeleine	Naomie Harris	
2016		Doctor Strange	Dr. Garrison	Sarah Malin	
2016		Our Kind of Traitor	Gail MacKendrick	Naomie Harris	
2016		Ride Along 2	Maya Cruz	Olivia Munn	
2017		Baywatch	Victoria Leeds	Priyanka Chopra	
2017		The Hitman's Bodyguard	Sonia Kincaid	Salma Hayek	
2017		Safe House	Elizabeth Ellroy	Dervla Kirwan	
2017		Sleepless	Jennifer Bryant	Michelle Monaghan	
2018		Solo: A Star Wars Story	L3-37	Phoebe Waller-Bridge	
2019		Ma	Eric Thompson	Juliette Lewis	
2021		Army of the Dead	Marianne Peters	Tig Notaro	
2021		Reminiscence	Emily "Watts" Sanders	Thandiwe Newton	
